= Tezosentan =

Chemical compound

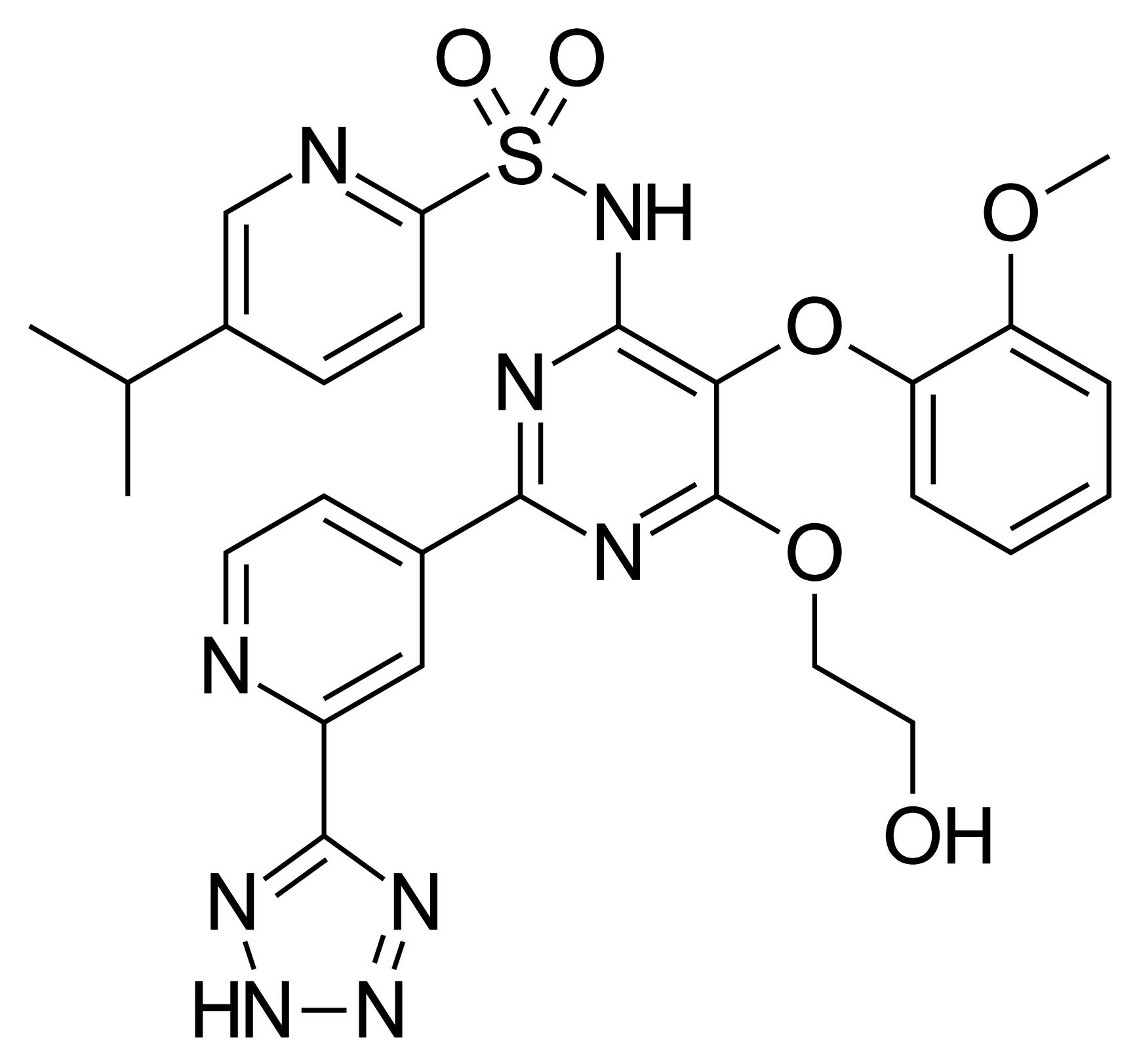

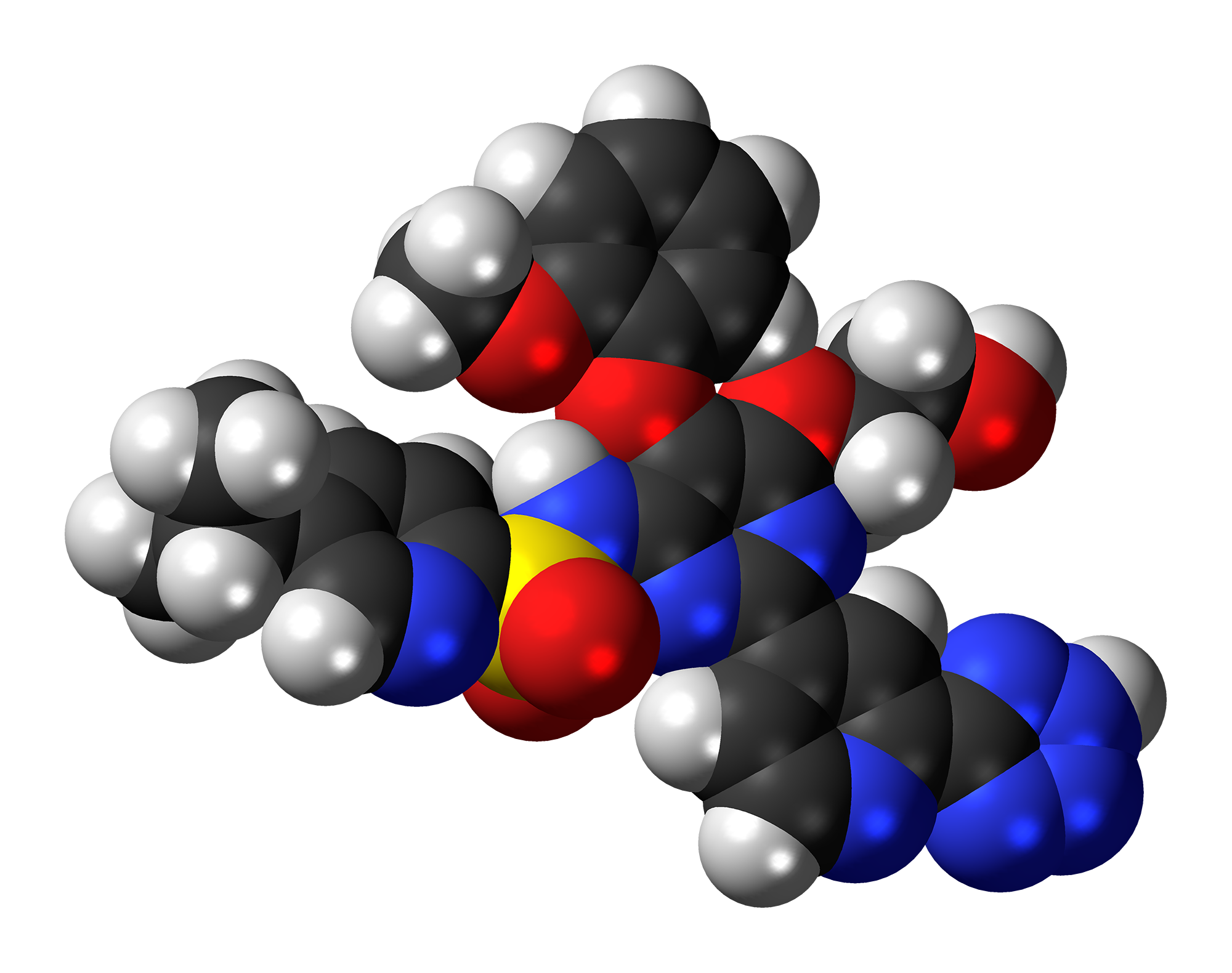

Clinical data
- ATC code: none

Identifiers
- IUPAC name: N-[6-(2-Hydroxyethoxy)-5-(2-methoxyphenoxy)-2-[2-(2H-tetrazol-5-yl)pyridin-4-yl]pyrimidin-4-yl]-5-propan-2-ylpyridine-2-sulfonamide
- CAS Number: 180384-57-0
- PubChem CID: 151174
- ChemSpider: 133242
- UNII: 64J9J55263
- ChEMBL: ChEMBL61780
- CompTox Dashboard (EPA): DTXSID20170956

Chemical and physical data
- Formula: C_{27}H_{27}N_{9}O_{6}S
- Molar mass: 605.63 g·mol^{−1}
- 3D model (JSmol): Interactive image
- SMILES: O=S(=O)(c1ncc(cc1)C(C)C)Nc3nc(nc(OCCO)c3Oc2ccccc2OC)c5ccnc(c4n[nH]nn4)c5
- InChI: InChI=1S/C27H27N9O6S/c1-16(2)18-8-9-22(29-15-18)43(38,39)34-26-23(42-21-7-5-4-6-20(21)40-3)27(41-13-12-37)31-24(30-26)17-10-11-28-19(14-17)25-32-35-36-33-25/h4-11,14-16,37H,12-13H2,1-3H3,(H,30,31,34)(H,32,33,35,36); Key:TUYWTLTWNJOZNY-UHFFFAOYSA-N

Tezosentan is a non-selective ET_{A} and ET_{B} receptor antagonist. It acts as a vasodilator and was designed by Actelion as a therapy for patients with acute heart failure. However, studies showed that tezosentan did not improve dyspnea or reduce the risk of fatal or nonfatal cardiovascular events.
