= Actelion =

Swiss biopharmaceutical company

Actelion Pharmaceuticals Ltd.

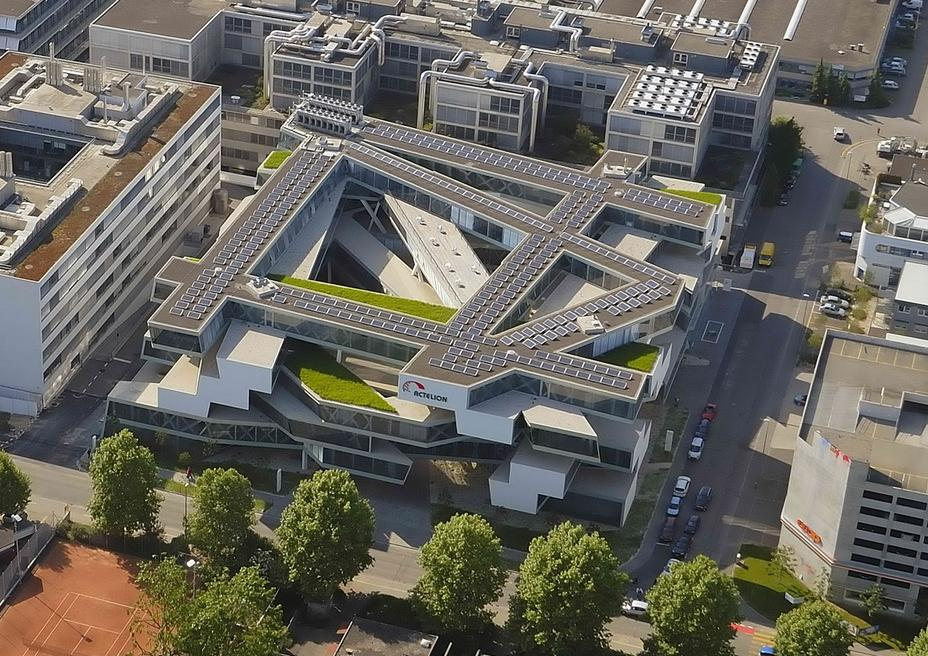
- Type: Subsidiary
- Industry: Pharmaceuticals/Biotech
- Founded: 1997; 29 years ago
- Founders: Jean-Paul Clozel, Martine Clozel, Walter Fischli, André J. Müller and Thomas Widmann
- Headquarters: Gewerbestrasse 16, Allschwil, Basel-Landschaft, Switzerland
- Area served: Research and Development of medicines for unmet medical need
- Key people: Jean-Paul Clozel (CEO)
- Products: Tracleer, Ventavis, Zavesca, Veletri, Opsumit
- Revenue: CHF 2.412 billion (2016)
- Operating income: CHF 992 million (2016)
- Number of employees: 2,624 (2016)
- Parent: Johnson & Johnson
- Website: actelion.com

Actelion Pharmaceuticals Ltd. is a pharmaceuticals and biotechnology company established in December 1997, headquartered in Allschwil near Basel, Switzerland. The company is part of Johnson & Johnson Innovative Medicine business segment.

Actelion focuses on the manufacture of drugs that treat rare and orphan diseases. Some of the drugs it has produced have been used to treat patients with symptoms related to central nervous system disorders, irregular heart conditions, immune system disorders, and cancer. One of the focuses of Actelion is treating individuals with pulmonary arterial hypertension (PAH), a heart condition that leaves patients with a short life expectancy (7–9 years) even with treatment.

Actelion scientists were among the first to work in the field of endothelin receptor antagonists. Actelion was initially financed with venture capital provided through a syndicate including Atlas Venture, Sofinnova and HealthCap.

Actelion develops and sells drugs in the continents of Asia, Europe, and North and South America. Actelion has 29 operative affiliates globally, including in the United States, Canada, Brazil, Australia, Japan, Switzerland, and several EU countries. The Swiss affiliate is located in Baden, the German affiliate in Freiburg, the Austrian one in Vienna, the French one in Paris and the UK affiliate is located in London.

In 2006, the company established the Actelion Endothelin Research Award program which supports selected clinical research projects.

In January 2017, Johnson & Johnson announced it would purchase the company for $30 billion. Actelion's research and development unit would also be spun off after the acquisition. The new company Idorsia was created from former Actelion drug discovery operations and early-stage clinical development assets and listed in June 2017 on the SIX Swiss Exchange.

In 2018, Johnson & Johnson announced they would discontinue the development of one of the phase III drugs it acquired during its purchase of Actelion.

== History ==
Actelion was founded in 1997 by husband and wife team Jean-Paul and Martine Clozel together with three colleagues after F. Hoffmann-La Roche cut their funding for Martine's cardiovascular program. They founded Actelion to work on a drugs for rare diseases and retained the rights to the intellectual property from Roche, including the molecule leading to the development of Tracleer, a drug for treating pulmonary arterial hypertension (PAH) which became a billion dollar seller.

== Acquisitions ==
=== CoTherix ===
CoTherix, Inc.
- Type: Subsidiary
- Industry: Pharmaceutical
- Founded: 2000
- Defunct: 9 January 2007; 19 years ago
- Fate: acquired by Actelion
- Headquarters: South San Francisco, California
- Key people: Donald J. Santel, CEO & Director
- Products: Ventavis
- Revenue: US$63 million
- Number of employees: 100
- Website: www.cotherix.com

CoTherix was a biopharmaceutical company located in South San Francisco, California. CoTherix focused on licensing, developing, and commercializing therapeutic products for the treatment of cardiopulmonary and other chronic diseases. The company, formerly known as Exhale Therapeutics, Inc., was founded in February 2000 by Gerard Turino, MD, a past president of the American Thoracic Society, and Jerome Cantor, MD, a pulmonary pathologist.

CoTherix's commercial product was "Ventavis (Iloprost)", an inhaled therapy for pulmonary artery hypertension (PAH). It was approved by the United States Food and Drug Administration in December 2004, two months after the company's initial public offering of 5 million shares of common stock.

Fasudil, Tracleer, Asahi and Actelion

Asahi developed fasudil and entered into a licensing and development agreement with CoTherix in July 2006 to pursue regulatory approval and commercialization in the United States and Europe based on their prior track record in this area. In November 2006, CoTherix and Actelion signed a merger plan, which was subsequently announced publicly; this followed the initiation of negotiations in August 2006. In January 2007, Actelion completed acquisition of all CoTherix stock, and summarily informed Asahi that work on fasudil would be terminated. Now, Actelion had a competitor blockbuster drug on the market, bosentan (Tracleer). Asashi claimed that Actelion's acquisition of CoTherix was directly aimed at removing fasudil as a competitor therapeutic, which it effectively did. Asahi pursued damages against CoTherix and Actelion initially through arbitration of a breach of contract claim, which netted them US$91 million, then in a jury trial, which resulted in an award of US$580 million in compensatory and punitive damages. This case has served as an exemplar of the notion that a company's contractual obligations persist after that company's acquisition.

On 20 November 2006, CoTherix agreed to be purchased for $420 million in cash by Actelion of Basel, Switzerland. On 9 January 2007, the deal closed with Actelion paying $13.50 for each share of CoTherix stock.

== Revenues ==
Actelion, headquartered in Switzerland, managed to earn 18.2% more in the year of 2016 than it did in 2015 while reporting an earning of 2,417.9 million Swiss Francs at the end of 2016. After accounting for all costs of production such as raw materials and wages, the company calculated its operating margin (operating profit to net sales ratio) to be 0.5% more in 2016 than it was in 2015.

== 'Kickbacks' Scandal ==
Tracleer was one of the main drugs manufactured and sold by Actelion. It has been used to treat excessively high blood pressure that affect arteries in the lungs and heart. In the years of 2014 and 2015, before Johnson & Johnson acquired the pharmaceutical company, Actelion was accused of pushing up the prices of Tracleer. According to a website known as Goodrx, sixty tablets (one month's supply) of this drug are sold for an average of $14,500.

Actelion was able to do this by illegally providing money to Medicare patients in order for them to be able to fulfill their co-payments for the drug Tracleer. Medicare is a healthcare program for adults who are 65 years and older. Most patients have their prescriptions covered by Medicare, but they must still pay a portion of the amount of the prescription, known as a co-payment. By making sure Medicare patients are still paying a certain amount, drug companies are unable to raise their prices to inordinately large amounts.

However, recently large drug companies, such as Actelion have been found to be illegally providing cash assistance to charities that help patients with their co-payments in order to increase the demand for their products. Actelion was able to use the charity organization by the name of Caring Voice Coalition to send money only to those people who were receiving prescriptions of Tracleer. When law enforcement was able to catch onto the illegal activities occurring with this organization with relation to two pharmaceutical companies (Actelion and United Therapeutics), it was banned from partaking in any further Medicare related matters. Actelion raised its drug prices to nearly 30% of the inflation rate.

Actelion was also complicit in referring patients to Caring Voice Coalition. Many unknowing patients who were gathering information about organizations that might cover their medical needs were being sent to CVC. Illegally, furthering the high demand for their drug.

While investigations were taking place, Actelion refused to accept that any criminal activity or misconduct had occurred. It has been forced to pay a $360 million as a settlement to the United States government for the malpractice relating to kickbacks to Medicare patients.

== Other Lawsuits ==
As of October, 2018, it was also caught in two lawsuit by drug buyers who claimed that Actelion was preventing a generic version of Tracleer to be manufactured so that it could stay in charge of the market as the sole supplier of the drug.

== Collaborating with Analytics 4 Life ==
Analytics 4 Life is a company that uses artificial intelligence to develop solutions for medical illnesses while focusing its efforts on coronary artery disease. Actelion has been reported to start working with Analytics 4 Life to use imaging technology with regards to pulmonary hypertension. A study, involving 500 individuals is being conducted to solve this widespread illness. These companies are hoping to be able to accurately assess an individual's cardiac health using imaging technology and thus avoiding the need for an invasive test. Actelion hopes that using this technology will help detect pulmonary hypertension in more people at an earlier age and thus leading to higher chances of success in the treatment.

== Medicines ==
Actelion currently has 10 compounds in its pipeline – including 3 in late-stage development – and 4 medicines on the market for orphan diseases:

- Tracleer (bosentan): Tracleer is one of Actelions best sellers and provides the most income to the company. Tracleer was the first oral treatment approved for pulmonary arterial hypertension, a rare, chronic, life-threatening disorder that severely compromises the functions of the lungs and heart. It is a dual endothelin receptor antagonist, see also: Endothelin receptor antagonist.
- Zavesca (miglustat): is currently the only approved oral treatment for patients with mild to moderate type 1 Gaucher disease for whom enzyme replacement therapy is unsuitable. Type 1 Gaucher disease is a rare and debilitating metabolic disorder.
- Ventavis (iloprost): Ventavis is indicated for the treatment of pulmonary arterial hypertension (WHO Group 1) in patients with NYHA Class III or IV symptoms.
- Veletri (epoprostenol for injection): is approved by the U.S. Food and Drug Administration (FDA) for the long-term intravenous treatment of primary pulmonary hypertension and pulmonary hypertension associated with the scleroderma spectrum of disease in NYHA Class III and Class IV patients who do not respond adequately to conventional therapy.

Some other drugs that have been produced by Actelion's to provide for the PAH (Pulmonary Arterial Hypertension) market include:

- Opsumit (Macitentan): Actelion received approval from the FDA for the manufacture of this drug on 16 January 2019. Opsumit has been manufactured to treat patients with CTEPH (Inoperable Chronic Thromboembolic Pulmonary Hypertension) in order to enhance their ability to exercise and boost their PVR (Pulmonary Vascular Resistance). It is an oral medication for ERA (Endothelin Receptor Antagonist) that has been used to slow down the prohibit the advancement of diseases and PAH. Actelion received approval for the manufacture of this drug by the FDA. Opsumit provides Actelion with its second largest source of sales. This product is available in Germany, Switzerland, Canada and Australia and the U.S. 15 March 2019, Actelion reported that while evaluating the effects of this drug on patient with PAH, it found a remarkable improvement in the right ventricle and reduced PVR (Pulmonary Vascular Resistance).
- Uptravi (Selexipag): Uptravi was originally it was developed by Nippon Shinyaku to treat people suffering from Pulmonary Arterial Hypertension. It is used to treat people suffering from PAH along with an advanced form of functional limitation. Uptravi is an oral medication that should be used along with a phosphodiesterase-5 inhibitor, an ERA(endothelin receptor antagonist) or with both for maximum effectiveness. Uptravi's popularity in the PAH market has made it the third most sold drug among all of Actelion's total sales. Actelion received approval from the Swiss medic for the manufacture and sale of this drug on 16 August 2016.
- Valchlor (mechlorethamine): In 2013, Actelion announced that Valchlor could be purchased in the United States. Valchlor is an FDA approved formula drug that can be applied topically every day. It is a gel that can be used to treat IA and IB mycosis fungoides-type cutaneous T-cell lymphoma (rate type of non-Hodgkin's Lymphoma). It has afflicted around 20,000 U.S. citizens and therefore classifies as an orphan disease.

=== Pipeline ===
Late-stage drugs in development by Actelion include:

- Cadazolid for Clostridioides difficile-associated diarrhea
- Macitentan for pediatric PAH and portopulmonary hypertension

== Key figures ==
By January 2011, Actelion had 2,467 employees, 392 in research, 640 in development, and 1017 in sales and marketing. In 2010, Actelion's sales amounted to 1,929 million CHF.

Actelion's shares have been listed on the SIX Swiss Exchange (ticker symbol ATLN) since 2000 SWX Swiss Exchange Swiss Leader Index. In September 2008, Actelion shares began trading as part of the Swiss Market Index.

== Awards ==
Actelion received the "Prix Hermès de l'innovation" (Hermès Award for Innovation) in April 2011: The "European Institute for Creative Strategy and Innovation", the creator of the Prix Hermès, was founded in 2003 in France.

The "performance report for Swiss pharma websites" awarded Actelion the first Prize in the second consecutive year:.

== See also ==
- List of pharmaceutical companies
- Pharmaceutical industry in Switzerland
