= Macitentan/tadalafil =

Medication

Combination of
- Macitentan: Endothelin receptor antagonist
- Tadalafil: Phosphodiesterase 5 (PDE5) inhibitor

Clinical data
- Trade names: Opsynvi
- AHFS/Drugs.com: Monograph
- MedlinePlus: a624029
- License data: US DailyMed: Macitentan and tadalafil
- Pregnancy category: Not recommended
- Routes of administration: By mouth
- ATC code: C02KX54 (WHO)

Legal status
- Legal status: AU: S4 (Prescription only); CA: ℞-only; US: ℞-only; EU: Rx-only

Identifiers
- KEGG: D12963

Macitentan/tadalafil, sold under the brand name Opsynvi, is a fixed dose combination medication used for the treatment of pulmonary arterial hypertension. It contains macitentan, an endothelin receptor antagonist (ERA); and tadalafil, a phosphodiesterase 5 (PDE5) inhibitor.

Macitentan/tadalafil was approved for medical use in Canada in October 2021, in the United States in March 2024, and in the European Union in September 2024.

== Medical uses ==
Macitentan/tadalafil is indicated for the chronic treatment of pulmonary arterial hypertension (PAH, WHO Group I) in adults of WHO functional class (FC) II-III.

== Adverse effects ==
Macitentan/tadalafil may cause harm to the fetus.

== Society and culture ==
=== Legal status ===
In July 2024, the Committee for Medicinal Products for Human Use of the European Medicines Agency adopted a positive opinion, recommending the granting of a marketing authorization for the medicinal product Yuvanci, intended for the treatment of pulmonary arterial hypertension (PAH). The applicant for this medicinal product is Janssen-Cilag International NV. The combination was authorized for medical use in the European Union in September 2024.
