= Aprocitentan =

Chemical compound

Clinical data
- Trade names: Tryvio
- Other names: ACT-132577
- AHFS/Drugs.com: Monograph
- MedlinePlus: a624023
- Routes of administration: By mouth
- Drug class: Antihypertensive
- ATC code: C02KN01 (WHO)

Legal status
- Legal status: CA: ℞-only; US: ℞-only; EU: Rx-only

Identifiers
- IUPAC name: 5-(4-Bromophenyl)-4-[2-(5-bromopyrimidin-2-yl)oxyethoxy]-6-(sulfamoylamino)pyrimidine
- CAS Number: 1103522-45-7
- PubChem CID: 25099191
- IUPHAR/BPS: 10070
- DrugBank: DB15059
- ChemSpider: 25027753
- UNII: MZI81HV01P
- KEGG: D11441
- ChEBI: CHEBI:76609
- ChEMBL: ChEMBL2165326
- ECHA InfoCard: 100.282.677

Chemical and physical data
- Formula: C_{16}H_{14}Br_{2}N_{6}O_{4}S
- Molar mass: 546.19 g·mol^{−1}
- 3D model (JSmol): Interactive image
- SMILES: C1=CC(=CC=C1C2=C(N=CN=C2OCCOC3=NC=C(C=N3)Br)NS(=O)(=O)N)Br
- InChI: InChI=1S/C16H14Br2N6O4S/c17-11-3-1-10(2-4-11)13-14(24-29(19,25)26)22-9-23-15(13)27-5-6-28-16-20-7-12(18)8-21-16/h1-4,7-9H,5-6H2,(H2,19,25,26)(H,22,23,24); Key:DKULOVKANLVDEA-UHFFFAOYSA-N

Aprocitentan, sold under the brand name Tryvio, is a medication used to treat hypertension (high blood pressure). It is developed by Idorsia. It is taken by mouth.

Aprocitentan is a receptor antagonist that targets both endothelin A and endothelin B receptors.

Aprocitentan was approved for medical use in the United States in March 2024. It is the first endothelin receptor antagonist to be approved by the US Food and Drug Administration (FDA) to treat systemic hypertension. The FDA considers it to be a first-in-class medication.

== Medical uses ==
Aprocitentan is indicated for the treatment of hypertension in combination with other antihypertensive drugs, to lower blood pressure in adults who are not adequately controlled on other medications.

== Adverse effects ==
Aprocitentan may cause hepatotoxicity (liver damage), edema (fluid retention), anemia (reduced hemoglobin), and decreased sperm count.

== Contraindications ==
Data from animal reproductive toxicity studies with other endothelin-receptor agonists indicate that use is contraindicated in pregnant women.

== Mechanism of action ==
Aprocitentan is an endothelin receptor antagonist that inhibits the protein endothelin-1 from binding to endothelin A and endothelin B receptors. Endothelin-1 mediates various adverse effects via its receptors, such as inflammation, cell proliferation, fibrosis, and vasoconstriction.

== Society and culture ==
=== Economics ===
Aprocitentan is developed by Idorsia, which sold it to Janssen and purchased the rights back in 2023, for US$343 million.

=== Legal status ===
Aprocitentan was approved for medical use in the United States in March 2024.

In April 2024, the Committee for Medicinal Products for Human Use (CHMP) of the European Medicines Agency adopted a positive opinion, recommending the granting of a marketing authorization for the medicinal product Jeraygo, intended for the treatment of resistant hypertension in adults. The applicant for this medicinal product is Idorsia Pharmaceuticals Deutschland GmbH. Aprocitentan was approved for medical use in the European Union in June 2024.
