= C23H34O5 =

The molecular formula C_{23}H_{34}O_{5} (molar mass: 390.51 g/mol, exact mass: 390.2406 u) may refer to:

- Digoxigenin (DIG)
- Mevastatin, or compactin
- Treprostinil
