= EtBr =

EtBr may refer to:

- Bromoethane
- Endothelin_B_receptor (when written as ET_{B}R)
- Ethidium bromide
