= BQ-123 =

Names
- IUPAC name 2-[(3R,6R,9S,12R,15S)-6-(1H-indol-3-ylmethyl)-9-(2-methylpropyl)-2,5,8,11,14-pentaoxo-12-propan-2-yl-1,4,7,10,13-pentazabicyclo[13.3.0]octadecan-3-yl]acetic acid
- Other names Cyclo(D-trp-D-asp-L-pro-D-val-L-leu)

Identifiers
CAS Number	136553-81-6
3D model (JSmol)	Interactive image
ChEMBL	ChEMBL1269102
ChemSpider	25069753
IUPHAR/BPS	997; 1003
PubChem CID	443289
UNII	S2A8YZM151
CompTox Dashboard (EPA)	DTXSID70929476
- InChI: InChI=1S/C31H42N6O7/c1-16(2)12-21-27(40)33-22(13-18-15-32-20-9-6-5-8-19(18)20)28(41)35-23(14-25(38)39)31(44)37-11-7-10-24(37)29(42)36-26(17(3)4)30(43)34-21/h5-6,8-9,15-17,21-24,26,32H,7,10-14H2,1-4H3,(H,33,40)(H,34,43)(H,35,41)(H,36,42)(H,38,39)/t21-,22+,23-,24-,26+/m0/s1 Key: VYCMAAOURFJIHD-AOYLRGCGSA-N; InChI=1/C31H42N6O7/c1-16(2)12-21-27(40)33-22(13-18-15-32-20-9-6-5-8-19(18)20)28(41)35-23(14-25(38)39)31(44)37-11-7-10-24(37)29(42)36-26(17(3)4)30(43)34-21/h5-6,8-9,15-17,21-24,26,32H,7,10-14H2,1-4H3,(H,33,40)(H,34,43)(H,35,41)(H,36,42)(H,38,39)/t21-,22+,23-,24-,26+/m0/s1 Key: VYCMAAOURFJIHD-AOYLRGCGBG
- SMILES: CC(C)C[C@H]1C(=O)N[C@@H](C(=O)N[C@@H](C(=O)N2CCC[C@H]2C(=O)N[C@@H](C(=O)N1)C(C)C)CC(=O)O)CC3=CNC4=CC=CC=C43

Properties
Chemical formula	C_{31}H_{42}N_{6}O_{7}
Molar mass	610.712 g·mol^{−1}
- Except where otherwise noted, data are given for materials in their standard state (at 25 °C [77 °F], 100 kPa). verify (what is ?) Infobox references

BQ-123, also known as cyclo(-D-Trp-D-Asp-Pro-D-Val-Leu-), is a cyclic pentapeptide that was first isolated from a fermentation broth of Streptomyces misakiensis in 1991. NMR studies indicate that the polypeptide backbone consists of a type II beta turn and an inverse gamma turn. The side-chains adopt different orientations depending on the solvent used. The proline carbonyl oxygen atom located at the onset of a beta turn is a sodium ion binding site. It has a high affinity for sodium ions and can coordinate up to three of them. Studies have shown that BQ123 is effective in reversing Ischemia-induced acute renal failure, and it has been suggested that this might be because BQ123 increases reabsorption of sodium ions in the proximal tubule cells.

BQ-123 is a selective ET_{A} endothelin receptor antagonist. As such, it is used as a biochemical tool in the study of endothelin receptor function. BQ-123 works as an ET-1 antagonist by reversing already established contractions to ET-1. This indicates that BQ-123 can work as an antagonist to remove ET-1 from its receptor (ET_{A}).
