= Diosuxentan =

Investigational drug

Clinical data
- Other names: SC-0062

Identifiers
- IUPAC name: 5-(1,3-benzodioxol-5-yl)-6-[2-(5-bromopyrimidin-2-yl)oxyethoxy]-N-(2-methoxyethylsulfamoyl)pyrimidin-4-amine
- CAS Number: 2305865-93-2
- PubChem CID: 155097467
- IUPHAR/BPS: 13748
- UNII: RJ4QU53ZY3

Chemical and physical data
- Formula: C_{20}H_{21}BrN_{6}O_{7}S
- Molar mass: 569.39 g·mol^{−1}
- 3D model (JSmol): Interactive image
- SMILES: COCCNS(=O)(=O)NC1=C(C(=NC=N1)OCCOC2=NC=C(C=N2)Br)C3=CC4=C(C=C3)OCO4
- InChI: InChI=InChI=1S/C20H21BrN6O7S/c1-30-5-4-26-35(28,29)27-18-17(13-2-3-15-16(8-13)34-12-33-15)19(25-11-24-18)31-6-7-32-20-22-9-14(21)10-23-20/h2-3,8-11,26H,4-7,12H2,1H3,(H,24,25,27); Key:CJPSPQBOXPPXMN-UHFFFAOYSA-N

Diosuxentan is an investigational new drug that is being developed by Biocity Biopharmaceutics for the treatment of diabetic nephropathy. It is an endothelin A receptor antagonist.
