= Endothelin receptor antagonist =

Drug that blocks endothelin receptors

An endothelin receptor antagonist (ERA) is a drug that blocks endothelin receptors.

== Classes ==
Three main kinds of ERAs exist:

CPU0213 also c.f. CPU 86017

- Dual ET Receptor Antagonists, which affect both endothelin A (ET_{A}) and B receptors (ET_{B}) CPU0213 [821780-32-9] is an example of a dual receptor endothelin receptor antagonist.
  - aprocitentan, bosentan, macitentan, tezosentan, Feloprentan (LU-302872 the HCl salt is called LU-420627) [204267-33-4],
- Selective ET_{A} Receptor Antagonists, which affect endothelin A receptors
  - sitaxentan, ambrisentan, atrasentan, BQ-123, sparsentan, zibotentan, avosentan, edonentan, clazosentan, fandosentan, diosuxentan.
- Selective ET_{B} Receptor Antagonists, which affect endothelin B receptors
  - BQ-788 and A192621 are used in research but have not yet reached clinical trial stage

Macitentan, ambrisentan and bosentan are mainly used for the treatment of pulmonary arterial hypertension, while atrasentan is an experimental anti-cancer drug.

Further (unsorted) examples include: BMS-182874, BMS-193884, BQ-485 [141594-26-5] CI 1020 (PD 156707) [162256-50-0] Enrasentan [167256-08-8], J 104132 [198279-45-7], L-754142 [173450-67-4], PABSA [188710-94-3], PD-155080, SB 209670 [157659-79-5], ZD1611 [186497-38-1]
