= Pulmonary arterial hypertension =

High blood pressure in the pulmonary arteries

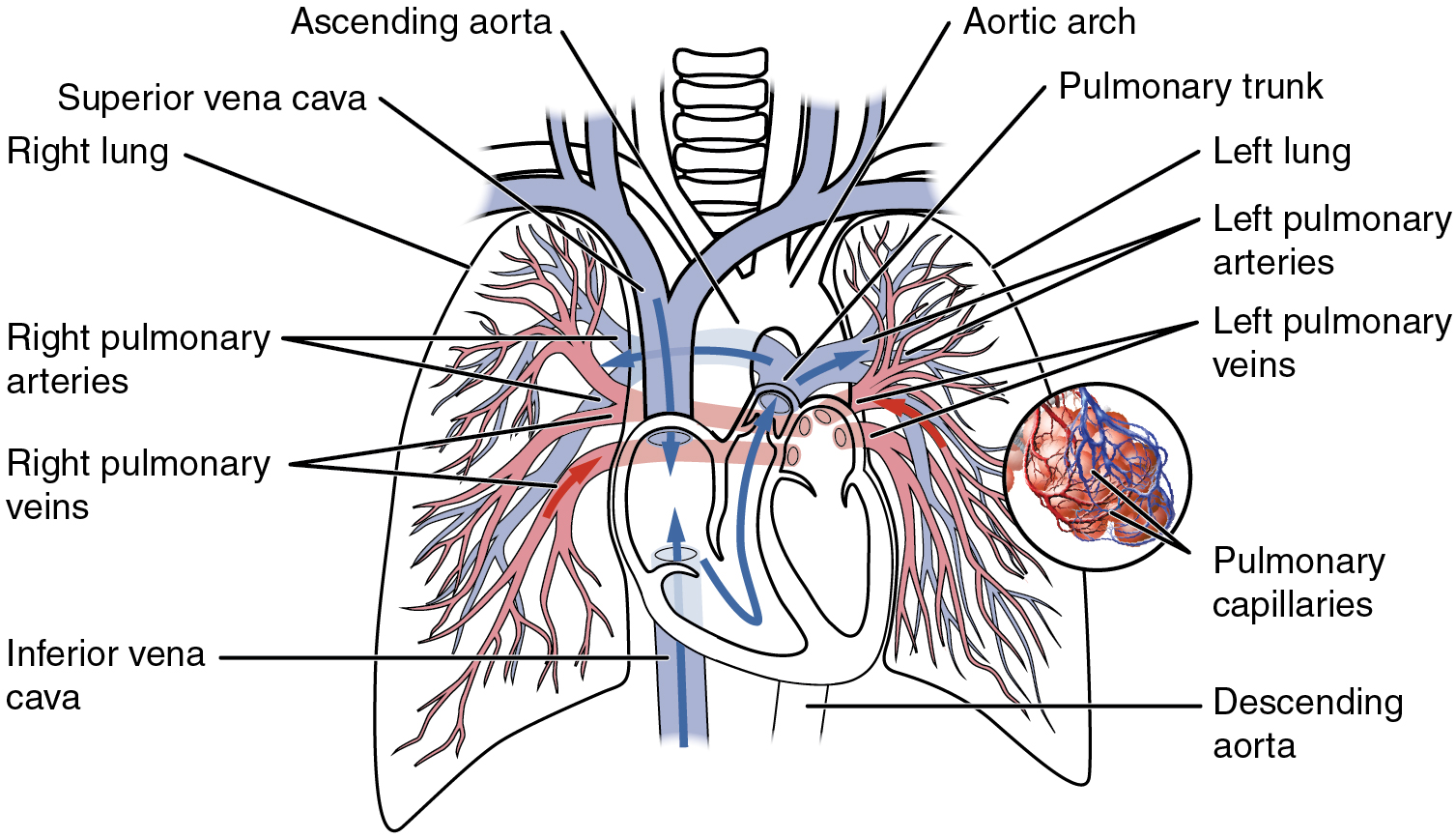
- Pulmonary arterial hypertension is characterized by increased pressure in the pulmonary arteries and arterioles (the pulmonary circulation proximal to the capillary bed)
- Specialty: Pulmonology, Cardiology
- Symptoms: Breathlessness, fatigue, lightheadedness, chest pain, fainting (late finding), leg swelling (late finding)
- Complications: Right heart failure
- Usual onset: Gradual
- Duration: Lifelong
- Causes: In select subtypes, HIV, scleroderma, mixed connective tissue disease
- Diagnostic method: Echocardiography, right heart catheterization to confirm diagnosis
- Differential diagnosis: Other causes of pulmonary hypertension
- Treatment: endothelin receptor antagonists, PDE5 inhibitors, prostacyclins, prostacyclin agonists, riociguat, sotatercept, atrial septostomy, lung transplant
- Prognosis: Poor
- Frequency: Prevalence about 25–60 cases per 1 million persons worldwide

Pulmonary arterial hypertension (PAH) is a syndrome in which the blood pressure in the pulmonary arteries and pulmonary arterioles (the blood vessels located proximal to the capillary bed, the site of oxygen exchange in the lungs) is elevated. This pre-capillary pulmonary artery pressure being elevated is essential, and by definition a mean pulmonary artery pressure greater than 20 mmHg as measured by a right heart catheterization is required for the diagnosis. This pre-capillary pulmonary hypertension is confirmed with measuring pulmonary vascular resistance being greater than 3 Woods Units. A pulmonary artery wedge pressure being less than 15 mmHg (also measured by right heart catheterization) excludes post-capillary bed (in the veins distal to the capillary bed) pulmonary hypertension. Pulmonary arterial hypertension is a subgroup of pulmonary hypertension and is categorized as World Health Organization as group 1. PAH is further subdivided into various categories based on the cause, including idiopathic, heritable, drug and toxin induced, PAH associated with specific diseases (such as connective tissue disorders, portal hypertension or HIV), PAH that is responsive to vasodilators, PAH with venous or capillary involvement, and persistent PAH in the newborn period.

If left untreated, the increased pulmonary vascular resistance will eventually lead to right heart failure and death. In the 1980s (before disease specific treatments became available) the 5 year survival rate was 34%. However, with more recent advances in disease specific therapies, survival in 2010 was 86%, 69%, and 61% at 1, 3 and 5 years respectively.

Signs and symptoms may be initially non-specific and may lead to a delay in appropriate diagnosis. Early symptoms include breathlessness (dyspnea). Other symptoms include fatigue, lightheadedness or fainting and chest pain. Late findings include swelling of the extremities, edema and ascites (which are signs of right heart failure).

Lower estimates regarding the prevalence of PAH are 15 cases per million adults with idiopathic PAH being 5.9 cases per million, with other estimates being 25 cases per 1 million people. In Europe, the prevalence ranges from 15 to 60 cases per year. More than half of PAH is believed to be idiopathic, drug induced or heritable.

Disease specific therapy involves targeting the various aberrant pathways involved in the disease. PDE5 inhibitors are used which cause dilation of blood vessels. Riociguat also causes vasodilation. Endothelin receptor antagonists cause vasodilation as well by blocking the action of the potent vasoconstrictor endothelin-1. Prostacyclins and prostacyclin agonists also cause vasodilation and also inhibit platelet aggregation. In disease that is refractory to medical therapy, an atrial septostomy may be used palliatively or as a bridge to lung transplantation.

== Signs and symptoms ==
Dyspnea (breathlessness) is the most common symptom associated with PAH and also usually the first symptom, with 98% of people experiencing dyspnea at the time of diagnosis. Fatigue, lightheadedness, palpitations, chest pain are also present. Late findings include near-syncope or syncope (fainting). As PAH progresses and chronically elevated pulmonary arterial pressures result in right heart failure; swelling of the legs and other areas of the body (edema), fluid buildup in the abdomen (ascites) develop as late symptoms.

Findings on physical exam indicating right heart failure may be present, including a loud P2 heart sound (the sound from the pulmonic valve closing), a heart murmur indicating tricuspid regurgitation or an elevated jugular venous pressure.

The WHO introduced a functional classification in PAH which is used to estimate disease severity as well as response to treatment. WHO class 1 is characterized by no limitations with usual physical activity. Class 2 involves discomfort with physical activity and mild limitations. Class 3 disease involves a marked limitation with physical activity and symptoms being present with light activities. Class 4 disease involves severe symptoms with almost any physical activity and symptoms being present at rest.

== Cause ==
The cause of PAH is unknown. Idiopathic PAH (WHO group 1.1) is not associated with an underlying disease or exposure. It is estimated that 39-46% of those with PAH have the idiopathic variant.

Group 1.2 PAH includes the variants that are heritable. Genetic variants or mutations in bone morphogenic protein receptor 2 (BMPR2) account for approximately 75-80% of cases of heritable PAH. BMPR2 mutations are also seen in 20% of idiopathic PAH. BMPR2 is a protein involved in endothelial cell (cells that line blood vessels) proliferation and remodeling. Other types of genes coding for proteins involved in BMPR2 signaling have also been implicated as causes of heritable PAH, such as activin A receptor type-2-like-1 ACVRL1, Endoglin (ENG), SMAD genes encoding for SMAD transcription factors involved in downstream BMPR2 signaling and cell growth including Smad1, Smad4 and Smad9. KCNK3 encodes for a potassium channel which regulates membrane potential across cells thus controlling vascular tone. Eukaryotic translation initiation factor 2 alpha kinase 4 (E1F2AK4) is mutated causes heritable pulmonary veno-occlusive disease and pulmonary capillary hemangiomatosis.

Group 1.3 PAH includes disease that is due to drug or toxin exposures. Methamphetamines, the chemotherapeutic dasatinib and the appetite suppressant and diet drug fenfluramine are associated with PAH.

Group 1.4 PAH is disease that is associated with underlying disease. Group 1.4.1 is associated with connective tissue disorders including scleroderma (with scleroderma being the most common disorder with an estimated 8-19% of scleroderma patients having PAH), lupus, mixed connective tissue disease, rheumatoid arthritis, and Sjogren's syndrome. Group 1.4.2 is associated with HIV, group 1.4.3 associated with portal hypertension (commonly due to liver cirrhosis), group 1.4.4 associated with congenital heart disease, and 1.4.5 associated with schistosomiasis. In areas where schistosomiasis is prevalent, PAH due to schistosomiasis is believed to be the most prevalent variant of PAH. It is estimated that 5-8% of people with schistosomiasis with liver fibrosis have PAH.

Group 1.5 PAH is the variant of PAH that is responsive to vasodilators (calcium channel blockers). The response to vasodilation by definition includes a decrease in the pulmonary arterial pressure of 10 mmHg or more to less than 40 mmHg without a decline in the cardiac output upon infusion of nitrous oxide(vasodilator) during the right heart catheterization. Vasodilator responsive PAH is estimated to be 6.8% of PAH patients in one study, and it is associated with a more favorable prognosis.

Group 1.6 PAH includes PAH with features of venous or capillary involvement and is thought to comprise 5-10% of PAH cases. Two conditions, pulmonary veno-occlusive disease and pulmonary capillary hemangiomatosis comprise this category. The subcategory is characterized by severe hypoxemia, capillary congestion and prominent post-capillary venule thickening.

Group 1.7 PAH, with an estimated 0.18% prevalence, is persistent pulmonary hypertension of the newborn. This results when the circulation does not transition from fetal to newborn configuration, leaving a patent ductus arteriosus and patent foramen ovale with left to right shunting exposing the pulmonary circulation to high pressures. PAH due to persistent pulmonary hypertension of the newborn has a 7.6% mortality at 1 year.

People may sometimes have PAH belonging to more than one sub-category.

== Pathophysiology ==
Multiple pathophysiological changes have been observed in PAH. This includes an imbalance in apoptosis (programmed cell death) and proliferation of endothelial cells, resulting in intimal thickening as well as proliferation and hyperplasia of the smooth muscle cells constituting the muscular layer of the pulmonary arteries. The smooth muscles in the tunica media also extend more distally than normal, encroaching upon the capillary bed. Infiltration of inflammatory cells, proliferation of fibroblasts and disruptions in collagen architecture result in adventitial thickening and remodeling. All of these changes combine to lead to thickening of the pulmonary arteries and arterioles with an associated increase in pulmonary arterial resistance (increased pulmonary artery pressure).

Pathogenic and inappropriate platelet activation coupled with endothelial injury leads to formation of micro-thrombi. And PAH also involve the characteristic plexiform lesions which are growths in the walls of the arterioles consisting of dilated blood vessels which communicate with the bronchial artery and vaso vasorum.

As pulmonary hypertension persists and worsens the right ventricle undergoes compensatory changes such as concentric hypertrophy of the heart muscle and changes in the microcirculation. However, with prolonged pulmonary hypertension, with the right ventricle pumping against elevated right heart pressures, the hypertrophy becomes maladaptive with microvascular rarefaction, and fibrosis. These changes eventually culminate in right heart failure.

Various enzymes or transporters involved in vasodilation are differentially expressed in those with pulmonary arterial hypertension. PAH is associated with reduced prostacyclin synthase activity in the vascular smooth muscle cells, resulting in decreased prostacyclin (PGI2) levels (prostacyclin acts as a vasodilator and inhibitor of vascular smooth muscle proliferation). The vasoconstrictor and cell proliferation activator endothelin-1 is also more active in those with PAH. And those with PAH also have evidence of reduce Nitric oxide synthetase activity, resulting in lower levels of the vasodilator nitric oxide. And those with PAH also more commonly express the L-allelic variant of the 5-HTT gene promoter, resulting in increased expression of the serotonin transporter (5-HTT), and leading to vasoconstriction via pulmonary artery smooth muscle proliferation.

== Diagnosis ==
Echocardiography is the preferred screening test in the diagnosis of PAH as it accurately estimates pulmonary pressures. Other causes of pulmonary hypertension, such as left heart disease (WHO group 2), pulmonary hypertension due to lung disease (such as COPD)(WHO group 3) and pulmonary hypertension due to chronic blood clots in the pulmonary arteries (WHO group 4) need to be ruled out. Some tests which are commonly used include a CT scan of the chest, ventilation perfusion scan or a CT angiography (to rule out pulmonary hypertension due to chronic blood clots), pulmonary function test, and a cardiac MRI. Cardiac MRI is the preferred test to evaluate right ventricular structure and function in PAH. Pulmonary function testing in PAH may show an obstructive or restrictive defect, and the diffusion capacity of carbon monoxide (used as a surrogate for gas exchange in the alveoli) is reduced.

A sleep study helps to rule out sleep disordered breathing, such as sleep apnea, which may contribute to PAH.

The N-terminal prohormone of brain natriuretic peptide (NT pro-BNP) may be monitored in those with PAH and is prognostic.

A right heart catheterization to measure right heart pressure is required for the diagnosis of PAH. PAH is definitively diagnosed with a right heart catheterization showing a mean pulmonary arterial pressure greater than 20 mmHg at rest, with a pulmonary vascular resistance being 3 Woods Units or greater (indicative of pulmonary hypertension in the pre-capillary vasculature; the arteries and arterioles), and a pulmonary artery wedge pressure being less than 15 mmHg (excluding post-capillary pulmonary hypertension; elevated pressures distal to the pulmonary capillary bed which may be seen in left heart disease). Inhaled nitric oxide (a potent vasodilator) or other vasodilators (adenosine, prostaglandin I2) are infused during the right heart catheterization to see if the PAH is responsive to vasodilators which may guide treatment decisions (use of calcium channel blockers).

Various clinical tests, such as the 6-minute walk test (the distance a person is able to walk in 6 minutes) are used prognostically as well as to assess response to treatment.

== Treatment ==
Supportive care in those with PAH involves using diuretics as needed for fluid overload, supplemental oxygen for hypoxemia, following a low sodium diet, an exercise program (such as walking), and routine immunizations. Vasoconstricting medications (frequently found in cough, cold and sinus formulations) should be avoided. Cardiopulmonary rehabilitation programs may be used for symptom control, patient education and counselling.

Anticoagulation, once universally used for PAH, is now indicated in idiopathic PAH, and its use is evaluated based on patient factors.

Disease specific therapy for PAH has improved disease free survival, symptom scores and mortality. Treatments consist of targeting the various aberrant pathways involved in the disease. For those with moderate to severe disease, dual therapy targeting at least 2 different disease specific pathways is indicated. Dual therapy is associated with greater mortality and disease free survival benefits over monotherapy.

PDE5 inhibitors (including sildenafil and tadalafil are used to dilate blood vessels by inhibiting the degradation of Cyclic guanosine monophosphate (cGMP). cGMP inhibits pulmonary artery smooth muscle proliferation and causes pulmonary artery smooth muscle cell relaxation, thus acting as a vasodilator.

Riociguat also causes vasodilation by stimulating cGMP production.

Endothelin receptor antagonists cause vasodilation as well by blocking the action of the potent vasoconstrictor and vascular smooth muscle cell proliferation activator endothelin-1. Bosentan inhibits endothelin-1 by blocking its action at the ETA and ETB receptors. Ambrisentan and sitaxsentan block endothelin-1 activity by selectively blocking the ETA receptor.

Prostacyclins and prostacyclin agonists also cause vasodilation and also inhibit platelet aggregation. Epoprostenol, treprostinil and iloprost act as prostacyclin I2 (PGI2) analogues by binding to and activating the prostacyclin receptor to cause vasodilation. PGI2 activates adenylate cyclase to convert adenosine triphosphate (ATP) to cyclic adenosine monophosphate (cAMP), cAMP inhibits proliferation of smooth muscle cells in the pulmonary artery walls, and causes relaxation of smooth muscle cells thus acting as a vasodilator. Selexipag acts as a PGI2 receptor agonist to also activate adenylate cyclase. Epoprostenol and treprostinil are given as continuous intravenous infusions. Treprostinil is also available as an inhaled form, as is iloprost.

In those who have a sustained vasodilator response as determined during the right heart catheterization (approximately 10% of those with PAH are responders), long acting calcium channel blockers nifedipine, diltiazem or amlodipine are indicated.

In disease that is refractory to medical therapy, an atrial septostomy may be used palliatively or as a bridge to lung transplantation.

== Prognosis ==
Five year survival in those with PAH was only 34%, but this has improved since the early 2000s when disease specific therapy was introduced. In 2010, survival was 86%, 69%, and 61% at 1, 3 and 5 years respectively. Heritable PAH is associated with an earlier disease onset, more severe hemodynamic features, and a reduced response to therapy as compared to idiopathic PAH. In those with scleroderma associated PAH, 3 year survival is 56% as compared to 94% in those with scleroderma without PAH. Those with PAH responding to vasodilators have a better prognosis.

PAH is associated with right heart failure and death (with a mortality rate of 13-17%) in pregnant women. It is recommended that women with PAH who may become pregnant use contraception. Estrogen containing contraceptives should be avoided due to the risk of blood clots.

== Epidemiology ==
The prevalence of PAH is estimated to be 25 cases per 1 million people in Western countries. PAH is more common in women, the ratio of females to males affected by PAH is 1.7 to 1. Others have estimated that the prevalence of PAH related to congenital heart disease is 25 cases per 1 million people.
