= Pulmonary capillary hemangiomatosis =

- Other names: Wagenvoort syndrome
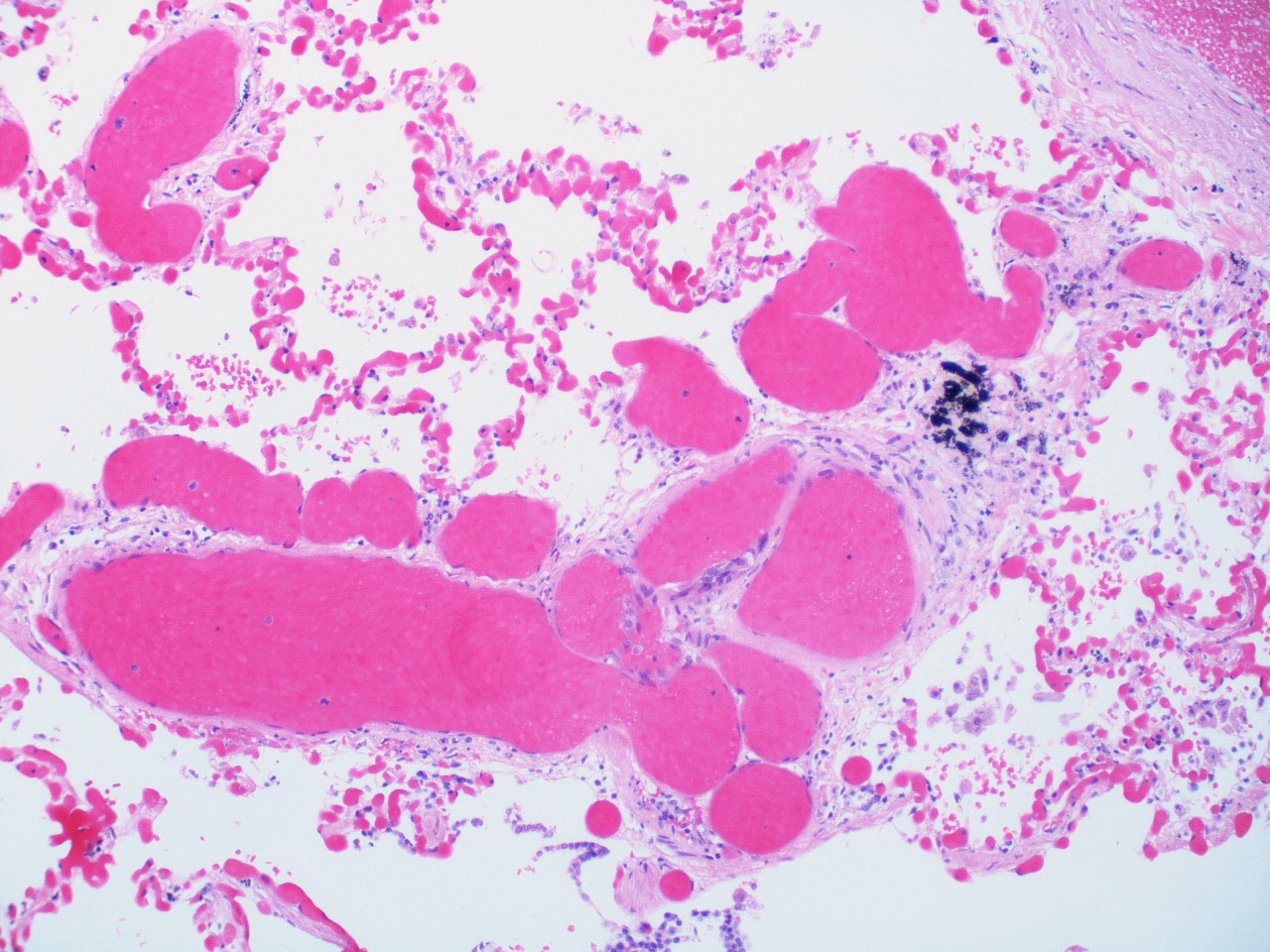
- Alveolar capillary proliferation as well as proliferation of larger blood vessels, probably venules
- Specialty: Pulmonology

Pulmonary capillary hemangiomatosis (PCH) is a disease affecting the blood vessels of the lungs, where abnormal capillary proliferation and venous fibrous intimal thickening result in progressive increase in vascular resistance. It is a rare cause of pulmonary hypertension, and occurs predominantly in young adults. Together with pulmonary veno-occlusive disease, PCH comprises WHO Group I' causes for pulmonary hypertension. Indeed, there is some evidence to suggest that PCH and pulmonary veno-occlusive disease are different forms of a similar disease process.

== Signs and symptoms ==
Nonspecific symptoms like fatigue, coughing, chest pain, and shortness of breath are what define clinical features.

== Causes ==
At least some cases appear to be due to mutations in the eukaryotic translation initiation factor 2-alpha kinase 4 (EIF2AK4) gene.

This condition has been reported in patients with Ehlers–Danlos syndrome, and scimitar syndrome.

== Diagnosis ==
Pulmonary artery hypertension, which manifests as enlarged pulmonary arteries, is a common imaging characteristic of pulmonary capillary hemangiomatosis. Additionally, as pulmonary artery hypertension worsens, typical CT imaging findings of right ventricular hypertrophy, leftward interventricular septum bowing, right atrial enlargement, and reflux of IV contrast into the inferior vena cava and hepatic veins can indicate secondary right heart dysfunction.

== Treatment ==
The only definitive treatment for this condition currently is lung transplantation.

Imatinib may be of use.

Epoprostenol does not appear to be of use.

== Epidemiology ==
The prevalence of this disease is estimated to be < 1/million. The usual age at presentation is between 20 and 40 but it has been reported in the newborn.

== History ==
This condition was first described in 1978.

== Outcome ==
Median survival without treatment is 3 years.

== Animals ==
This condition has been reported in cats and dogs.
