= Bosentan =

Medication

- Molecular structure of bosentan

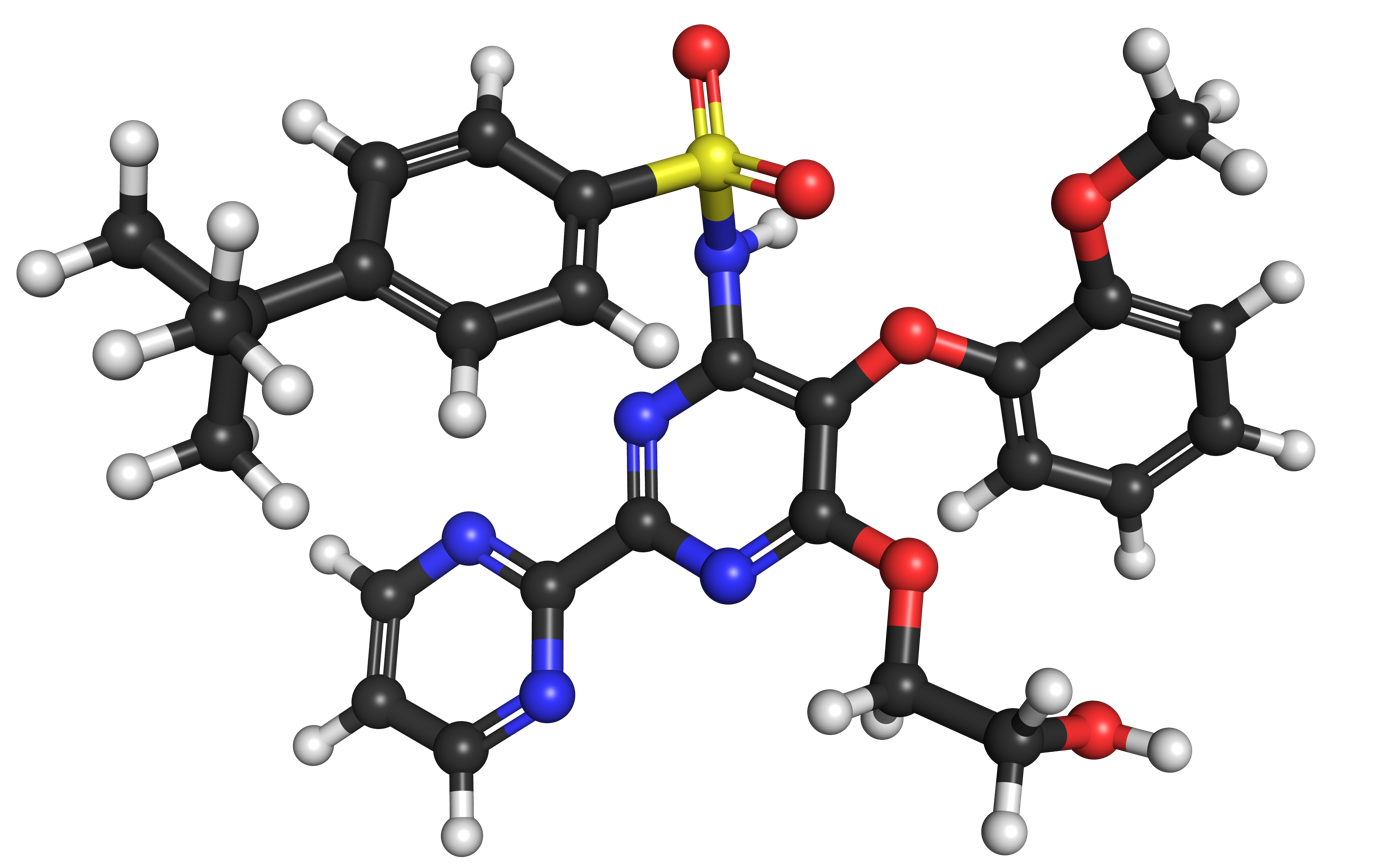
- 3D representation of a bosentan molecule

Clinical data
- Trade names: Tracleer, Stayveer, Safebo
- AHFS/Drugs.com: Monograph
- MedlinePlus: a605001
- License data: US DailyMed: Bosentan
- Pregnancy category: AU: X (High risk)
- Routes of administration: By mouth
- ATC code: C02KX01 (WHO)

Legal status
- Legal status: AU: S4 (Prescription only); UK: POM (Prescription only); US: ℞-only; EU: Rx-only; In general: ℞ (Prescription only)

Pharmacokinetic data
- Bioavailability: 50%
- Protein binding: >98%
- Metabolism: Liver
- Elimination half-life: 5 hours

Identifiers
- IUPAC name: 4-tert-butyl-N-[6-(2-hydroxyethoxy)-5-(2-methoxyphenoxy)[2,2'-bipyrimidin]-4-yl]benzenesulfonamide
- CAS Number: 147536-97-8
- PubChem CID: 104865
- IUPHAR/BPS: 3494
- DrugBank: DB00559
- ChemSpider: 94651
- UNII: XUL93R30K2
- KEGG: D07538; as monohydrate: D01227
- ChEBI: CHEBI:51450
- ChEMBL: ChEMBL957
- CompTox Dashboard (EPA): DTXSID7046627
- ECHA InfoCard: 100.171.206

Chemical and physical data
- Formula: C_{27}H_{29}N_{5}O_{6}S
- Molar mass: 551.62 g·mol^{−1}
- 3D model (JSmol): Interactive image
- SMILES: CC(C)(C)c1ccc(cc1)S(=O)(=O)Nc2c(c(nc(n2)c3ncccn3)OCCO)Oc4ccccc4OC
- InChI: InChI=1S/C27H29N5O6S/c1-27(2,3)18-10-12-19(13-11-18)39(34,35)32-23-22(38-21-9-6-5-8-20(21)36-4)26(37-17-16-33)31-25(30-23)24-28-14-7-15-29-24/h5-15,33H,16-17H2,1-4H3,(H,30,31,32); Key:GJPICJJJRGTNOD-UHFFFAOYSA-N

Bosentan, sold under the brand name Tracleer among others, is a dual endothelin receptor antagonist medication used in the treatment of pulmonary artery hypertension (PAH).

Bosentan is available as film-coated tablets (62.5 mg or 125 mg) or as dispersible tablets for oral suspension (32 mg).

== Medical uses ==
Bosentan is used to treat people with moderate pulmonary arterial hypertension and to reduce the number of digital ulcers — open wounds on especially on fingertips and less commonly the knuckles — in people with systemic scleroderma.

== Contraindications ==
Bosentan is contraindicated in people taking glyburide due to an increased risk of increased liver enzymes and liver damage when these two agents are taken together.

Use of bosentan with cyclosporine is contraindicated because cyclosporine A has been shown to markedly increase serum concentration of bosentan.

== Adverse effects ==
Bosentan causes harm to fetuses (teratogenic) and it may render hormonal contraceptives ineffective.

In the US it is only available from doctors who follow an FDA-mandated risk evaluation and mitigation strategy (REMS) with respect to risks to fetuses and its risks of causing liver damage.

In addition to the risk of causing birth defects and of causing liver damage, bosentan has a high risk of causing edema, pulmonary veno-occlusive disease, decreasing sperm counts, and decreases in hemoglobin and hematocrit.

Very common adverse effects (occurring in more than 10% of people) include headache, elevated transaminases, and edema. Common adverse effects (between 1% and 10% of people) include anemia, reduced hemoglobin, hypersensitivity reactions, skin inflammation, itchiness, rashes, red skin, flushing, fainting, heart palpitations, low blood pressure, nasal congestion, gastro-esophageal reflux disease, and diarrhea.

== Drug interactions ==
Bosentan may render hormonal contraceptives ineffective.

== Mechanism of action ==
Bosentan is a competitive antagonist of endothelin-1 at the endothelin-A (ET-A) and endothelin-B (ET-B) receptors. Under normal conditions, endothelin-1 binding of ET-A receptors causes constriction of the pulmonary blood vessels. Conversely, binding of endothelin-1 to ET-B receptors has been associated with both vasodilation and vasoconstriction of vascular smooth muscle, depending on the ET-B subtype (ET-B1 or ET-B2) and tissue. Bosentan blocks both ET-A and ET-B receptors, but is thought to exert a greater effect on ET-A receptors, causing a total decrease in pulmonary vascular resistance.

== Pharmacokinetics ==
After oral administration, maximum plasma concentrations of bosentan are attained within 3–5 hours and the terminal elimination half-life (t_{1/2}) is about 5 hours in healthy adult subjects. The exposure to bosentan after intervenous and oral administration is about 2-fold greater in adult patients with pulmonary arterial hypertension than in healthy adult subjects.

Absolute bioavailability of bosentan is about 50% in healthy subjects. Peak plasma concentration of bosentan with the dispersable tablets for oral suspension is 14% less on average compared to peak concentration of the oral tablets.

Bosentan is a substrate of CYP3A4 and CYP2C9. CYP2C19 may also play a role in its metabolism. It is also a substrate of the hepatic uptake transporter organic anion-transporting polypeptides (OATPs) OATP1B1, OATP1B3, and OATP2B1.

Elimination of bosentan is mostly hepatic, with minimal contribution from renal and fecal excretion.

Use of bosentan with cyclosporine is contraindicated because cyclosporine A has been shown to markedly increase serum concentration of bosentan.

== History ==
Bosentan was studied in heart failure in a trial called REACH-1 that was terminated early in 1997, due to toxicity at the dose that was being studied.

It was approved for pulmonary artery hypertension in the US in November 2001, and in the European Union in May 2002.

== Society and culture ==
=== Economics ===
By 2013, worldwide sales of bosentan were $1.57 billion. The patents on bosentan started expiring in 2015.
