= Endothelin receptor =

G protein-coupled receptor

endothelin receptor type A

Identifiers
- Symbol: EDNRA
- NCBI gene: 1909
- HGNC: 3179
- OMIM: 131243
- RefSeq: NM_001957
- UniProt: P25101

Other data
- Locus: Chr. 4 q31.2
Search for
- Structures: Swiss-model
- Domains: InterPro

endothelin receptor type B

Identifiers
- Symbol: EDNRB
- Alt. symbols: HSCR2, HSCR
- NCBI gene: 1910
- HGNC: 3180
- OMIM: 131244
- RefSeq: NM_000115
- UniProt: P24530

Other data
- Locus: Chr. 13 q22
Search for
- Structures: Swiss-model
- Domains: InterPro

There are at least four known endothelin receptors, ET_{A}, ET_{B1}, ET_{B2} and ET_{C}, all of which are G protein-coupled receptors whose activation result in elevation of intracellular-free calcium, which constricts the smooth muscles of the blood vessels, raising blood pressure, or relaxes the smooth muscles of the blood vessels, lowering blood pressure, among other functions.

== Physiological functions ==
- ET_{A} is a subtype for vasoconstriction These receptors are found in the smooth muscle tissue of blood vessels, and binding of endothelin to ET_{A} increases vasoconstriction (contraction of the blood vessel walls) and the retention of sodium, leading to increased blood pressure.
- ET_{B1} mediates vasodilation, When endothelin binds to ET_{B1} receptors, this leads to the release of nitric oxide (also called endothelium-derived relaxing factor), natriuresis and diuresis (the production and elimination of urine) and mechanisms that lower blood pressure.
- ET_{B2} mediates vasoconstriction
- ET_{C} has yet no clearly defined function.
- ET receptors are also found in the nervous system where they may mediate neurotransmission and vascular functions.

=== Brain and nerves ===
Widely distributed in the body, receptors for endothelin are present in blood vessels and cells of the brain, choroid plexus and peripheral nerves. When applied directly to the brain of rats in picomolar quantities as an experimental model of stroke, endothelin-1 caused severe metabolic stimulation and seizures with substantial decreases in blood flow to the same brain regions, both effects mediated by calcium channels.

A similar strong vasoconstrictor action of endothelin-1 was demonstrated in a peripheral neuropathy model in rats.

== Clinical significance ==
Mutations in the EDNRB gene are associated with ABCD syndrome and some forms of Waardenburg syndrome.

== See also ==
- Endothelin receptor antagonist
