= Treprostinil =

Chemical compound

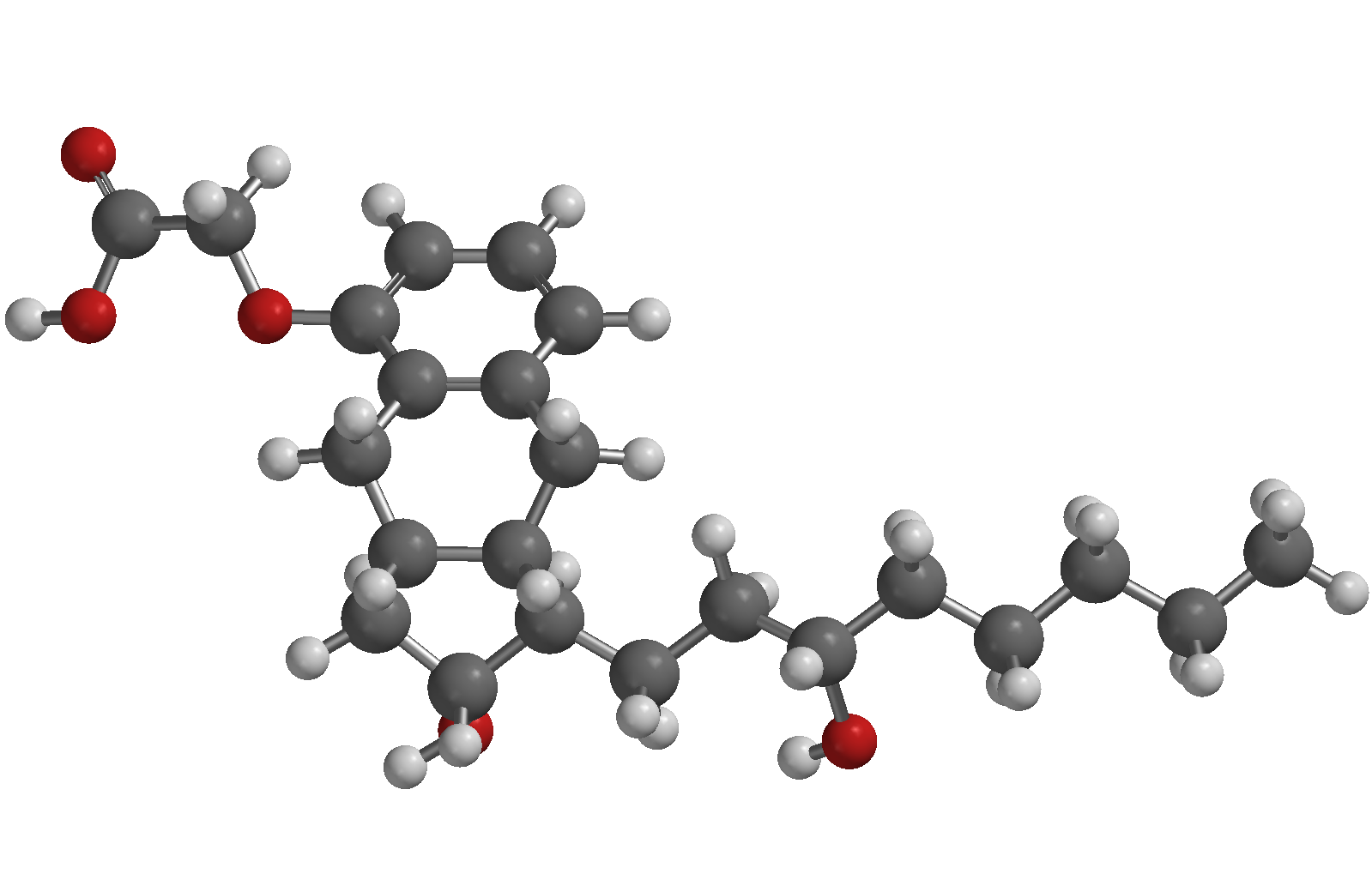

Clinical data
- Trade names: Remodulin, Orenitram, Tyvaso, others
- AHFS/Drugs.com: Monograph
- MedlinePlus: a622038
- License data: US DailyMed: Treprostinil
- Pregnancy category: AU: B3
- Routes of administration: Subcutaneous, intravenous, inhalation, by mouth
- ATC code: B01AC21 (WHO)

Legal status
- Legal status: US: ℞-only; EU: Rx-only; In general: ℞ (Prescription only)

Pharmacokinetic data
- Bioavailability: ~100%
- Metabolism: Substantially metabolized by the liver
- Elimination half-life: 4 hours
- Excretion: Urine (79% of administered dose is excreted as 4% unchanged drug and 64% as identified metabolites); feces (13%)

Identifiers
- IUPAC name: (1R,2R,3aS,9aS)-[[2,3,3a,4,9,9a-Hexahydro-2-hydroxy-1-[(3S)-3-hydroxyoctyl]-1H-benz[f]inden-5-yl]oxy]acetic acid
- CAS Number: 81846-19-7
- PubChem CID: 6918140
- IUPHAR/BPS: 5820
- DrugBank: DB00374
- ChemSpider: 5293353
- UNII: RUM6K67ESG
- KEGG: D06213; D08628
- ChEBI: CHEBI:50861
- ChEMBL: ChEMBL1201254
- CompTox Dashboard (EPA): DTXSID901021654
- ECHA InfoCard: 100.236.149

Chemical and physical data
- Formula: C_{23}H_{34}O_{5}
- Molar mass: 390.520 g·mol^{−1}
- InChI: InChI=1S/C23H34O5/c1-2-3-4-7-17(24)9-10-18-19-11-15-6-5-8-22(28-14-23(26)27)20(15)12-16(19)13-21(18)25/h5-6,8,16-19,21,24-25H,2-4,7,9-14H2,1H3,(H,26,27)/t16-,17-,18+,19-,21+/m0/s1; Key:PAJMKGZZBBTTOY-ZFORQUDYSA-N

Treprostinil, sold under the brand names Remodulin for infusion, Orenitram for oral, and Tyvaso for inhalation among others, is a vasodilator that is used for the treatment of pulmonary arterial hypertension.

Treprostinil was approved for use in the United States in May 2002.

== Medical uses ==
Treprostinil is indicated for the treatment of pulmonary arterial hypertension in people with NYHA Class II-IV symptoms to diminish symptoms associated with exercise.

Treprostinil inhalation solution and treprostinil inhalation powder are indicated for the treatment of people with pulmonary arterial hypertension (WHO Group 1) to improve exercise ability; and people with pulmonary hypertension associated with interstitial lung disease (WHO Group 3) to improve exercise ability.

In the European Union, treprostinil (Trepulmix) is indicated for the treatment of adults with WHO Functional Class III or IV and inoperable chronic thromboembolic pulmonary hypertension; or persistent or recurrent chronic thromboembolic pulmonary hypertension after surgical treatment to improve exercise capacity.

== Adverse effects ==
- Since treprostinil is a vasodilator, its antihypertensive effect may be compounded by other medications that affect the blood pressure, including calcium channel blockers, diuretics, and other vasodilating agents.
- Because of treprostinil's inhibiting effect on platelet aggregation, there is an increased risk of bleeding, especially among patients who are also taking anticoagulants.

Common side effects depending on route of administration:

- 85% of patients report pain or other reaction at the infusion site.

== History ==
In 1976, the first paper on prostacyclin was published.

Treprostinil (Remodulin) was approved for medical use in the United States in May 2002, and again in July 2018.

Treprostinil (Tyvaso), as inhalation solution, was approved for medical use in the United States in July 2009, and again in April 2021.

Treprostinil (Orenitram), as extended release tablets, was approved for medical use in the United States in December 2013.

Treprostinil (Trepulmix) was authorized for medical use in the European Union in April 2020. Trepulmix is a hybrid medicine that is similar to the reference medicine Remodulin. It contains the same active substance, but it is used for treating a different form of pulmonary hypertension.

Treprostinil (Tyvaso DPI), as inhalation powder, was approved for medical use in the United States in May 2022.

Treprostinil (Yutrepia), as inhalation powder, was approved for medical use in the United States in June 2025.

== Research ==
Treprostinil therapy may be effective in treating Degos disease.
