= Endothelin receptor type B =

Protein-coding gene in the species Homo sapiens

EDNRB

Identifiers
- Aliases: EDNRB, ABCDS, ET-B, ET-BR, ETB, ETBR, ETRB, HSCR, HSCR2, WS4A, ETB1, endothelin receptor type B
- External IDs: OMIM: 131244; MGI: 102720; GeneCards: EDNRB

Gene location (Human)
Chr.	Chromosome 13 (human)
Band	13q22.3	Start	77,895,481 bp
Band	13q22.3	End	77,975,529 bp

Gene location (Mouse)
Chr.	Chromosome 14 (mouse)
Band	14 E2.3|14 53.05 cM	Start	104,052,061 bp
Band	14 E2.3|14 53.05 cM	End	104,081,838 bp
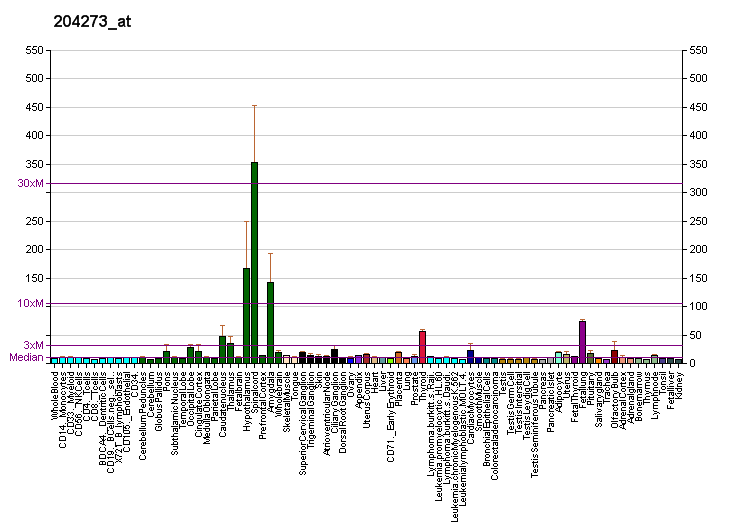

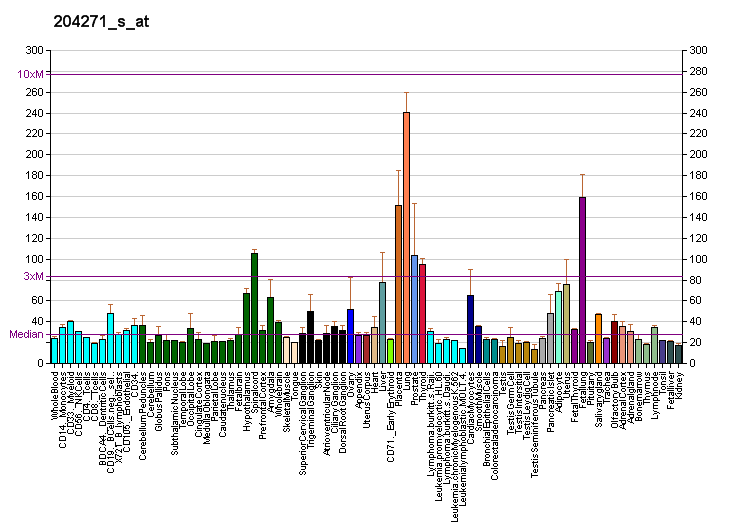

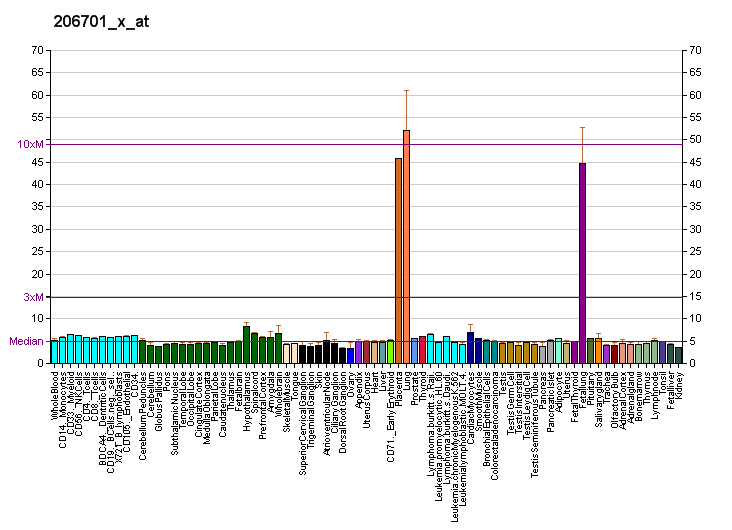
RNA expression pattern
Bgee	Human / Mouse (ortholog); Top expressed in: parotid gland; external globus pallidus; lower lobe of lung; superior vestibular nucleus; spinal ganglia; dorsal motor nucleus of vagus nerve; pars compacta; internal globus pallidus; pars reticulata; right lung / Top expressed in: iris; vestibular sensory epithelium; pineal gland; gastrula; globus pallidus; atrium; left lung lobe; ciliary body; migratory enteric neural crest cell; paraventricular nucleus of hypothalamus; More reference expression data
BioGPS	More reference expression data
Gene ontology
Molecular function	endothelin receptor activity; G protein-coupled receptor activity; signal transducer activity; peptide hormone binding; protein binding; type 1 angiotensin receptor binding
Cellular component	integral component of membrane; nuclear membrane; membrane; integral component of plasma membrane; membrane raft; plasma membrane
Biological process	enteric smooth muscle cell differentiation; negative regulation of adenylate cyclase activity; positive regulation of protein phosphorylation; peripheral nervous system development; positive regulation of renal sodium excretion; response to organic cyclic compound; regulation of sensory perception of pain; positive regulation of urine volume; vasoconstriction; positive regulation of cytosolic calcium ion concentration; epithelial fluid transport; ageing; vasodilation; negative regulation of apoptotic process; negative regulation of transcription by RNA polymerase II; cGMP-mediated signaling; regulation of fever generation; nervous system development; regulation of blood pressure; phospholipase C-activating G protein-coupled receptor signaling pathway; cell surface receptor signaling pathway; enteric nervous system development; vein smooth muscle contraction; response to lipopolysaccharide; macrophage chemotaxis; response to pain; neural crest cell migration; positive regulation of cell population proliferation; posterior midgut development; developmental pigmentation; pigmentation; sensory perception of pain; negative regulation of neuron maturation; positive regulation of penile erection; regulation of epithelial cell proliferation; melanocyte differentiation; cellular response to lipopolysaccharide; regulation of pH; signal transduction; endothelin receptor signaling pathway; calcium-mediated signaling; G protein-coupled receptor signaling pathway; response to endothelin
Sources:Amigo / QuickGO
Orthologs
Databases	NCBI: entry; OMA: entry
Species	Human	Mouse
Entrez	1910	13618
Ensembl	ENSG00000136160	ENSMUSG00000022122
UniProt	P24530	P48302
RefSeq (mRNA)	NM_000115; NM_001122659; NM_001201397; NM_003991	NM_001136061; NM_001276296; NM_007904
RefSeq (protein)	NP_000106; NP_001116131; NP_001188326; NP_003982	NP_001129533; NP_001263225; NP_031930
Location (UCSC)	Chr 13: 77.9 – 77.98 Mb	Chr 14: 104.05 – 104.08 Mb
PubMed search
- Wikidata
View/Edit Human	View/Edit Mouse

Endothelin receptor type B, (ET-B) is a protein that in humans is encoded by the EDNRB gene.

== Function ==
Endothelin receptor type B is a G protein-coupled receptor which activates a phosphatidylinositol-calcium second messenger system. Its ligand, endothelin, consists of a family of three potent vasoactive peptides: ET_{1}, ET_{2}, and ET_{3}. A splice variant, named SVR, has been described; the sequence of the ETB-SVR receptor is identical to ETRB except for the intracellular C-terminal domain. While both splice variants bind ET_{1}, they exhibit different responses upon binding which suggests that they may be functionally distinct.

== Regulation ==
In melanocytic cells the EDNRB gene is regulated by the microphthalmia-associated transcription factor. Mutations in either gene are links to Waardenburg syndrome.

== Clinical significance ==
The multigenic disorder, Hirschsprung disease type 2, is due to mutation in endothelin receptor type B gene.

== Animals ==
In horses, a mutation in the middle of the EDNRB gene, Ile118Lys, when homozygous, causes Lethal White Syndrome. In this mutation, a mismatch in the DNA replication causes lysine to be made instead of isoleucine. The resulting EDNRB protein is unable to fulfill its role in the development of the embryo, limiting the migration of the melanocyte and enteric neuron precursors. A single copy of the EDNRB mutation, the heterozygous state, produces an identifiable and completely benign spotted coat color called frame overo.

== Interactions ==
Endothelin receptor type B has been shown to interact with Caveolin 1.

== Ligands ==
Agonists

- IRL-1620

Antagonists

- A-192,621
- BQ-788
- Bosentan (unselective ET_{A} / ET_{B} antagonist)

== See also ==
- Endothelin receptor
