= Endothelin A receptor =

Protein-coding gene in the species Homo sapiens

EDNRA

Identifiers
- Aliases: EDNRA, ET-A, ETA, ETA-R, ETAR, ETRA, hET-AR, MFDA, endothelin receptor type A
- External IDs: OMIM: 131243; MGI: 105923; GeneCards: EDNRA

Gene location (Human)
Chr.	Chromosome 4 (human)
Band	4q31.22-q31.23	Start	147,480,917 bp
Band	4q31.22-q31.23	End	147,544,954 bp

Gene location (Mouse)
Chr.	Chromosome 8 (mouse)
Band	8|8 C1	Start	78,389,660 bp
Band	8|8 C1	End	78,451,093 bp
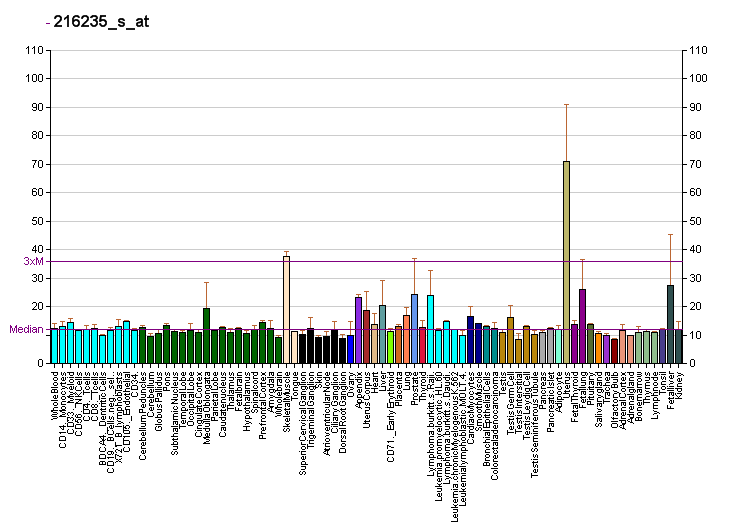

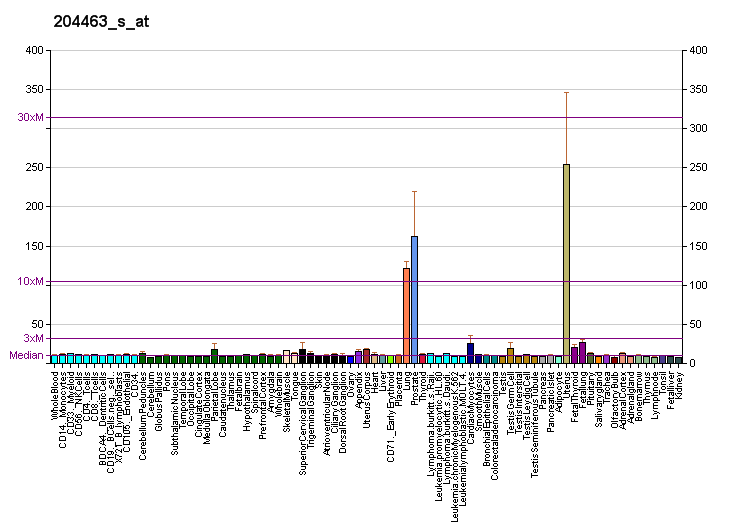

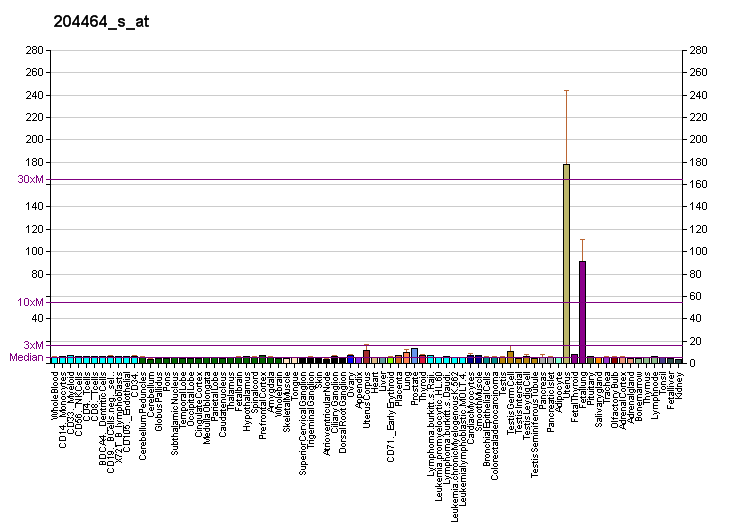
RNA expression pattern
Bgee	Human / Mouse (ortholog); Top expressed in: tail of epididymis; seminal vesicula; visceral pleura; urethra; endometrium; caput epididymis; cardiac muscle tissue of right atrium; tibia; corpus epididymis; stromal cell of endometrium / Top expressed in: genital tubercle; Gonadal ridge; vas deferens; external carotid artery; left lung lobe; ureter; lumbar spinal ganglion; atrium; dermis; internal carotid artery; More reference expression data
BioGPS	More reference expression data
Gene ontology
Molecular function	endothelin receptor activity; G protein-coupled receptor activity; signal transducer activity; protein binding; phosphatidylinositol phospholipase C activity
Cellular component	integral component of membrane; membrane; plasma membrane; integral component of plasma membrane
Biological process	smooth muscle contraction; response to hypoxia; neural crest cell development; vasoconstriction; head development; in utero embryonic development; activation of phospholipase C activity; respiratory gaseous exchange by respiratory system; activation of adenylate cyclase activity; regulation of blood pressure; endothelin receptor signaling pathway; enteric nervous system development; development of the heart; artery smooth muscle contraction; branching involved in blood vessel morphogenesis; cell population proliferation; signal transduction; positive regulation of cytosolic calcium ion concentration; G protein-coupled receptor signaling pathway; adenylate cyclase-inhibiting G protein-coupled receptor signaling pathway; glucose transmembrane transport; regulation of glucose transmembrane transport
Sources:Amigo / QuickGO
Orthologs
Databases	NCBI: entry; OMA: entry
Species	Human	Mouse
Entrez	1909	13617
Ensembl	ENSG00000151617	ENSMUSG00000031616
UniProt	P25101	Q61614
RefSeq (mRNA)	NM_001166055; NM_001256283; NM_001957; NM_001354797	NM_010332
RefSeq (protein)	NP_001159527; NP_001948; NP_001341726	NP_034462
Location (UCSC)	Chr 4: 147.48 – 147.54 Mb	Chr 8: 78.39 – 78.45 Mb
PubMed search
- Wikidata
View/Edit Human	View/Edit Mouse

Endothelin receptor type A, also known as ET_{A}, is a human G protein-coupled receptor.

== Interactions ==
Endothelin receptor type A has been shown to interact with HDAC7A and HTATIP.

== See also ==
- Endothelin receptor
