= Melvin =

Melvin is a masculine given name and surname, likely a variant of Melville and a descendant of the French surname de Maleuin and the later Melwin. It may alternatively be spelled as Melvyn or, in Welsh, Melfyn and the name Melivinia or Melva may be used a feminine form. Of Norman French origin, originally Malleville, which translates to "bad town," it likely made its way into usage in Scotland as a result of the Norman conquest of England. It came into use as a given name as early as the 19th century, in English-speaking populations.

== As a name ==
=== Given name ===
==== Academics ====
- Melvin Calvin (1911–1997), American chemist who discovered the Calvin cycle
- Melvin Day (1923–2016), New Zealand artist and art historian
- Melvin Hochster (born 1943), American mathematician
- Melvin Konner (born 1946), Professor of Anthropology
- Melvin Schwartz (1932–2006), American physicist who won the Nobel Prize in Physics in 1988
- Melvin Alvah Traylor, Jr. (1915–2008), American ornithologist

==== Businessmen ====
- Melvin Jones (1879–1961), businessman and founder of Lions Club
- Melvin Alvah Traylor (1878–1934), American banker
- Melvin T. Tukman, American asset manager, investor, philanthropist.

==== Performers ====
- Melvin Edmonds, member of R&B group After 7
- Melvin Franklin (1942–1995), stage name of American bass singer David Melvin English
- Melvin Gibbs, American bass guitarist
- Melvin Odoom (born 1980), English comedian and presenter
- Melvin Kaminsky (born 1926), given name of actor Mel Brooks
- Melvin Parker (1944–2021), American drummer who played in James Brown's band
- Melvin Van Peebles (1932–2021), American actor and director
- Melvin Ragin (1951–2018), American guitarist known as "Wah-Wah Watson"
- Melvin Rhyne (1936–2013), jazz organist
- Melvin Seals (born 1953), American musician
- Melvin Sia (born 1979), Malaysian-Chinese actor, singer, model
- Melvin Sparks (1946–2011), American jazz guitarist
- Melvin Howard Tormé (1925–1999), American musician, singer, composer, arranger, drummer, actor, and author

==== Politicians ====
- Melvin Everson (born 1957), American minister and politician
- Melvin Hollowell, American lawyer and politician
- Melvin R. Laird, Sr. (1877–1946), American politician
- Melvin R. Laird (1922–2016), American politician and writer
- Melvin Maas (1898–1964), U.S. Representative from Minnesota
- Melvin J. Miller (1919–1974), American farmer and politician
- Melvin McQuaid (1911–2001), member of the Canadian House of Commons
- Melvin Steinberg (born 1933), American politician, Lieutenant Governor of Maryland from 1987 to 1995
- Melvin ZumBrunnen (born 1941), American politician

==== Sportsmen ====
- Melvin Baker (born 1950), American football player
- Melvin Booker (born 1972), American basketball player
- Melvin Brown (footballer) (born 1979), Mexican football player
- Melvin Bullitt (born 1984), American football player
- Melvin Byrd (born 1958), American football player
- Melvin Cunningham (born 1973), American football player
- Melvin Ejim (born 1991), Nigerian-Canadian professional basketball player
- Melvin Ely (born 1978), American basketball player
- Melvin Fowler (born 1979), American football center
- Melvin Gordon (born 1993), American football player
- Melvin Guillard (born 1983), American mixed martial artist
- Melvin Kalousdian (born 2011), Swedish racing driver
- Melvin Jones (American football) (born 1955), American football player
- Melvin Manhoef (born 1976), Dutch kickboxer
- Melvin Mastil (born 2000), Algerian footballer
- Melvin Mitchell (born 1953), American football player
- Melvin Mora (born 1972), Major League baseball player
- Melvin Nieves (born 1971), baseball player
- Melvin Ott (1909–1958), Major League Baseball right fielder
- Melvin Platje (born 1988), Dutch football player
- Melvin Raffin (born 1998), French athlete specialising in the triple jump
- Melvin Rosen (1928–2018), American track coach
- Melvin Siani (born 2004), Canadian football player
- Melvin Stewart (born 1968), American swimmer and Olympic medal winner
- Melvin Sutton, American NFL cheerleader
- Melvin Tarley (born 1982), Liberian footballer
- Melvin Tong (born 1975), Hong Kong former professional tennis player
- Melvin Turpin (1960–2010), American basketball player
- Melvin Upton Jr. (born 1984), American baseball player
- Melvin Valladares (born 1984), Honduran football striker
- Melvin Watkins (born 1954), American basketball coach

==== Writers ====
- Melvin Jules Bukiet, American author and literary critic
- Melvin Burgess (born 1954), British author of children's fiction
- Melvin Frank (1913–1988), American screenwriter and film director
- Melvin B. Tolson (1898–1966), American modernist poet

==== Others ====
- Melvin Belli (1907–1996), American lawyer known as 'The King of Torts'
- Melvin Bernhardt (1931–2015), American stage and television director
- Melvin Dummar (1944–2018), American hoaxer and subject of film Melvin and Howard
- Melvin Edwards (1937–2026), American abstract sculptor and printmaker
- Melvin N. Johnson, American academic administrator
- Melvin Purvis (1903–1960), American FBI agent
- Melvin Storer (1921–2003), United States Navy shipfitter
- Melvin Williams (disambiguation), multiple people
- Melvin Zais (1916–1981), United States Army general

==== Fictional characters ====
- Melvin Frohike, in the television shows The X-Files and The Lone Gunmen
- Melvin Palmer, on the television show Boston Legal
- Melvin the Superhero Guy, a puppet of ventriloquist Jeff Dunham
- Melvin Sneedly, a character from the Captain Underpants series
- Melvin Potter, also known as Gladiator, a Daredevil comics character

=== Surname ===
- Allan Melvin (1923–2008), American actor
- Billy Melvin (born 1977), Scottish footballer
- Bob Melvin (born 1961), American baseball player and manager
- Charles Melvin (1885–1941) British soldier and Victoria Cross recipient
- Chasity Melvin (born 1976), American basketball player
- Craig Melvin (born 1979), American journalist
- Daniel Wilkie Melvin (1838–1916), auctioneer in South Australia
- Doug Melvin (born 1952), Canadian baseball executive
- Doug Melvin (rower) (1928–2021), British rower
- Ed Melvin (1916–2004), American basketball player
- Eileen Melvin, American businessperson
- Eric Melvin (born 1966), American musician
- Fordyce R. Melvin (1832–1915), American politician
- G. S. Melvin (1886–1946), British pantomime dame and comedian
- Henry A. Melvin (1865–1920), American judge
- Isaac Melvin (1811–1853), American architect
- Jemma Melvin, British pudding creator
- Jerry Melvin (1929–2020), American politician
- Joan Orie Melvin, American judge
- Joe Melvin (1853–1909), Australian journalist
- John Melvin, multiple people
- Kenneth R. Melvin (born 1952), American politician and lawyer
- Leland D. Melvin (born 1964), American astronaut
- Martin Melvin (businessman) (1879–1952), British businessman and newspaper manager
- Martin Melvin (footballer) (born 1969), Scottish footballer
- Mekenna Melvin (born 1985), American actress
- Mungo Melvin (born 1955), British soldier and historian
- Murray Melvin (1932–2023), English stage and film actor
- Norman C. Melvin III (born 1950), American botanist and plant ecologist
- Peter Melvin (1933–2009), British architect
- Rachel Melvin (born 1985), American actress
- Rashaan Melvin (born 1989), American football player
- Randy Melvin (born 1959), American football coach
- Reine Arcache Melvin (born 1959), Filipina author
- Sean Melvin (born 1994), Canadian soccer player
- Thayer Melvin (1835–1906), American lawyer, politician, and judge
- Theodore N. Melvin (1846–1897), American lawyer and politician
- Tom Melvin (born 1961), American football coach
- William L. Melvin, American engineer

== See also ==
- Melvyn, a list of people with the given name
- Justice Melvin (disambiguation)
