= Melvyn Rubenfire =

American physician (born 1939)

Dr. Melvyn Rubenfire

Melvyn Rubenfire is an American academic and clinical cardiologist. During his 55year career in cardiovascular medicine he was a tenured full professor for 45 years during which he helped train an estimated 1,500 residents in internal medicine and 250 trainees in cardiovascular medicine. He helped publish over 250 articles in medical journals and co-authored 35 chapters in medical textbooks.

He served on the Board of Trustees of the American Heart Association of Michigan, as Michigan Governor for the American College of Cardiology and American College of Physicians and served on the Prevention Committee of the American College of Cardiology. Also consulting positions or advisory board with the United States Department of Energy regarding artificial heart research and development, Michigan Department of Public Health, American Heart Association of Michigan, Hospice of Southeastern Michigan, Scleroderma Foundation, Pulmonary Hypertension Association, Blue Cross Blue Shield of Michigan, and Park Davis, Bristol Meyer Squibb, and Pfizer Pharmaceutical.

Rubenfire retired from his clinical career at the University of Michigan in mid-2025 and was honored to continue his academic career as Professor Emeritus allowing him to continue faculty participation in research and teaching locally and nationally.

== Early life ==
He was born to Jewish parents Harry Rubenfire and Sue Nachman in Detroit in 1939. His parents encouraged him towards higher education and a professional career considering job opportunities and promotion was very limited by anti-Semitism. He married Diane Mellen in 1961 just prior to entering medical school and soon after had children Mark and Karen, and now five grandchildren and one great-grandson. His career in cardiology was heavily influenced by his interest in cardiovascular physiology, cardiology faculty at Wayne State University School of Medicine and his academic career by his colleague and pioneer heart surgeon Adrian Kantrowitz and his team at Sinai Hospital of Detroit.

=== Education ===
Rubenfire earned a BS in 1961 and Doctor of Medicine degree from Wayne State University in Detroit, Michigan, in 1965. He served his residency in internal medicine at Sinai Hospital in Detroit, Michigan, from 1965–1968. He then served two years of training (1968-1970) in cardiovascular disease at the Henry Ford Hospital in Detroit, Michigan.

He received board certification in internal medicine in 1970 and cardiovascular disease in 1973, and holds the following honorary fellowships: American College of Physicians (Internal Medicine), American College of Cardiology, American College of Chest Physicians, American Heart Association, Senior Fellow of the Society for Angiography, and National Lipid Association.

== Academic and Clinical Career ==
His training program in cardiology was lengthened in the late 1960’s with the second year dedicated to training in invasive cardiology including heart catheterization for coronary and valvular heart disease, pulmonary hypertension, and implantation and management of pacemakers.

His academic future was markedly enhanced by skills developed with his second year NIH fellowship at Henry Ford Hospital. The grant was to develop an animal model for valvular heart disease. Each experience prepared him to be hired as full-time director of cardiology at Sinai Hospital in 1970 with the charge/opportunity to develop a high quality clinical and research program with Dr. Adrian Kantrowwitz, the newly hired head of cardiac surgery. Dr. Kantrowitz, the inventor of the intra-aortic balloon pump to treat heart shock and severe heart failure in patients and animal models was recruited to begin a heart surgical and research program.

Sinai Hospital leadership encouraged the development of a clinical cardiology training program, and research facilities for both large and small animals. Rubenfire was responsible for helping to develop treatment options for induced heart attacks and shock, both acute and chronic heart failure. The clinical program became known locally and nationally for devices to treat acute heart failure and shock. Most important was a mechanical heart-assist device, the intra-aortic balloon pump that was in the early phase of development to reduce mortality in cardiogenic shock and heart attacks. The team included Dr. Kantrowitz as the lead, surgical intensivists, biomedical engineers, and industry interested in developing new catheters and pacemakers.

In the late 1970’s he became interested in cardiac rehabilitation which was well advanced in Europe. He proposed Sinai recruit an exercise physiologist with a PhD and experience in the new field of cardiopulmonary exercise testing and cardiac rehab. He was fortunate to recruit Barry Franklin PhD, the PI of a pilot clinical trial to evaluate cardiac rehab and train him in clinical cardiovascular disease and prevention. They worked together to develop one of the first cardiac rehab programs in the US and published methods and values extensively.

Rubenfire attended a series of seminars and post-graduate courses and worked closely with colleagues in other disciplines (e.g. pulmonary, endocrine, dental, radiology, CV and thoracic surgery). He recruited a lipid chemist and began special clinics in lipids, heart failure, arrhythmias, and angina for advanced clinical care and research at Sinai Hospital. Each was led by well-prepared cardiology colleagues with coordination of the research programs by Dr. Roger Blevins, one of the first Doctors of Pharmacy to participate in clinical research.

Rubenfire was active at Wayne State University, holding positions from instructor (1970) to full Professor of Internal Medicine (1985–1991). He spent 20 years at Sinai as Section Chief of Cardiovascular Diseases (Sinai Hospital, 1970–1991) and Chairman of the Department of Medicine (Sinai Hospital, 1984–1991).

In 1991, he was recruited to the faculty of the University of Michigan as a tenured professor. Soon after arriving he was asked to lead the small cardiac rehab effort and create a preventive cardiology clinic to include lipid management and resident rotations. Together with his colleague Lori Mosca who was working on her PhD in Epidemiology they published extensively on CV risk factors particularly evaluating difference by gender and obesity including predictors of oxidized LDL and pioneering use of brachial and carotid artery reactivity to assess endothelial function to identify persons at risk and with coronary artery disease. Techniques that identified risk cohorts but were shown to have no clinical value.

Soon after arriving at the University the pulmonary medicine lung transplant team requested Rubenfire join them to help determine causes of pulmonary hypertension that may be treatable with lung transplant. With Dr. Fernando Martinez from pulmonary medicine they developed a large pulmonary hypertension program with referral throughout Michigan to clarify diagnosis, prognosis and treatment options and enroll patients in clinical trials with promising treatments for primary pulmonary hypertension with a universally high risk for mortality.

By raising funds and support from the Division he was able to employ non-physician scientists who created the database within Preventive Cardiology that helped monitor and improve clinical care, results that would be published and provide academic opportunities to residents and fellows, and by non-physician staff (statisticians, dentists, nurses, social workers, nutritionists, and psychologists). Preventive Cardiology included lipid, hypertension vascular, and Women’s clinic, and cardiac rehab. Amongst the most important and novel contributions of his team was (is) the Metabolic Fitness Program (MetFit) a novel outpatient program that used the resources of cardiac rehab to reduce risk of diabetes and vascular disease resulting from the metabolic syndrome. As the Professor Emeritus he currently continues his research in cardiac rehabilitation as the PI of a randomized controlled study “Designing and Assessing a Women Only Cardiac Rehabilitation Program”.

Amongst his other contributions to assess cardiopulmonary disease, treatment options and response to treatment he has published extensively on cardiopulmonary exercise testing of measured oxygen consumption and use of the six-minute hall-walk. And together with Dr. Robert Brook, the value of apolipoprotein B and LDL particle size rather than LDL-C as the lipid marker of risk and treatment target, use of lipoprotein (a) a risk factor, and use of carotid artery intima media thickness and plaque area to assess presence and risk of atherosclerosis.

== Awards ==
Rubenfire’s honors include the Laureate Award from the American College of Physicians – Michigan Chapter (2000), Faculty Teacher of the Year (University of Michigan, 2010), and election to the Clinical Excellence Society (2013). In 2020, the University of Michigan established the Melvyn Rubenfire, Professorship in Preventive Cardiology in his honor, and in July 2025 he was awarded Professor Emeritus status.

== Selected publications ==
- Wajszczuk, W J; Stopczyk, M J; Moskowitz, M S; Zochowski, R J; Bauld, T; Dabos, P L; Rubenfire, M (1978). "Noninvasive recording of His-Purkinje activity in man by ORS-triggered signal averaging". Circulation. 58 (1): 95–102. doi:10.1161/01.cir.58.1.95. ISSN 0009-7322. PMID 647894.
- Sharma, Kavita; Duvernoy, Claire; Rubenfire, Melvyn (2020), "Secondary Prevention of Coronary Artery Disease", Practical Cardiology, Cham: Springer International Publishing, pp. 75–82, doi:10.1007/978-3-030-28328-5_7, ISBN 978-3-030-28326-1
- Kantrowitz, Adrian; Wasfie, Tarik; Freed, Paul S.; Rubenfire, Melvyn; Wajszczuk, Waldemar; Schork, M.Anthony (1986). "Intraaortic balloon pumping 1967 through 1982: Analysis of complications in 733 patients". The American Journal of Cardiology. 57 (11): 976–983. doi:10.1016/0002-9149(86)90742-3. ISSN 0002-9149. PMID 3515900.
- Young, Rosalie; Kahana, Eva; Rubenfire, Melvyn (1987). "Preventive Health Behavior Advice". Evaluation & the Health Professions. 10 (4): 394–407. doi:10.1177/016327878701000403. ISSN 0163-2787.
- Wrisley, David; Vander, Lauren; Franklin, Barry; Willens, Harold; Rubenfire, Melvyn (1987). "Comparison of Cardiorespiratory Responses during Steady-State and Nonsteady-State Exercise Tests in Patients with Left Ventricular Dysfunction". American Journal of Noninvasive Cardiology. 1 (6): 346–349. doi:10.1159/000470792. ISSN 0258-4425.
- Palaniappan, Latha; Anthony, Monique-Nicole; Mahesh, Cynthia; Elliott, Michael; Killeen, Anthony; Giacherio, Donald; Rubenfire, Melvyn (2002). "Cardiovascular risk factors in ethnic minority women aged ≤30 years". The American Journal of Cardiology. 89 (5): 524–529. doi:10.1016/s0002-9149(01)02291-3. ISSN 0002-9149. PMID 11867035.
- Mosca, Lori; Rubenfire, Melvyn; Mandel, Caroline; Rock, Cheryl; Tarshis, Tom; Tsai, Alan; Pearson, Thomas (August 1997). "Antioxidant Nutrient Supplementation Reduces the Susceptibility of Low Density Lipoprotein to Oxidation in Patients With Coronary Artery Disease". Journal of the American College of Cardiology. 30 (2): 392–399. doi:10.1016/s0735-1097(97)00188-5. ISSN 0735-1097. PMID 9247510.
- Ricciardi, Mark J.; Knight, Bradley P.; Martinez, Fernando J.; Rubenfire, Melvyn (1998). "Inhaled nitric oxide in primary pulmonary hypertension". Journal of the American College of Cardiology. 32 (4): 1068–1073. doi:10.1016/s0735-1097(98)00361-1. ISSN 0735-1097. PMID 9768734.
- Cornwell, William K.; McLaughlin, Vallerie V.; Krishnan, Sangeetha M.; Rubenfire, Melvyn (September 2011). "Does the Outcome Justify an Oral-First Treatment Strategy for Management of Pulmonary Arterial Hypertension?". Chest. 140 (3): 697–705. doi:10.1378/chest.10-3019. ISSN 0012-3692. PMID 21622545.
- Nallamothu, Brahmajee K.; Saint, Sanjay; Bielak, Lawrence F.; Sonnad, Seema S.; Peyser, Patricia A.; Rubenfire, Melvyn; Fendrick, A. Mark (2001-03-26). "Electron-Beam Computed Tomography in the Diagnosis of Coronary Artery Disease". Archives of Internal Medicine. 161 (6): 833–838. doi:10.1001/archinte.161.6.833. ISSN 0003-9926. PMID 11268225.
- Palaniappan, Latha; Anthony, Monique-Nicole; Mahesh, Cynthia; Elliott, Michael; Killeen, Anthony; Giacherio, Donald; Rubenfire, Melvyn (March 2002). "Cardiovascular risk factors in ethnic minority women aged ≤30 years". The American Journal of Cardiology. 89 (5): 524–529. doi:10.1016/s0002-9149(01)02291-3. ISSN 0002-9149. PMID 11867035.
- Rubenfire, Melvyn; Cao, Ning; Smith, Dean E; Mosca, Lori (December 2000). "Usefulness of brachial artery reactivity to isometric handgrip exercise in identifying patients at risk and with coronary artery disease". The American Journal of Cardiology. 86 (11): 1161–1165. doi:10.1016/s0002-9149(00)01196-6. ISSN 0002-9149. PMID 11090784.
- Pitt, Bertram; Rubenfire, Melvyn (1999-05-25). "Risk Stratification for the Detection of Preclinical Coronary Artery Disease". Circulation. 99 (20): 2610–2612. doi:10.1161/01.cir.99.20.2610. ISSN 0009-7322. PMID 10338449.
- Rubenfire, Melvyn; Grossman, Natalie S.; Kaciroti, Niko; Apsey, David J.; Loesche, Walter J. (2007). "Anaerobic dental flora and the acute coronary syndrome". Coronary Artery Disease. 18 (2): 111–116. doi:10.1097/mca.0b013e328012359a. ISSN 0954-6928. PMID 17301602.
- Wryobeck, John M.; Lippo, Giuseppina; Mclaughlin, Valerie; Riba, Michelle; Rubenfire, Melvyn (2007). "Psychosocial Aspects of Pulmonary Hypertension: A Review". Psychosomatics. 48 (6): 467–475. doi:10.1176/appi.psy.48.6.467. ISSN 0033-3182. PMID 18071092.
- Brook, Robert D.; Doshi, Hardik; Bard, Robert L.; Rubenfire, Melvyn (2009). "Potential Effect of an Apoprotein B-based Algorithm on Management of New Patients with Hypertriglyceridemia Referred to a Specialty Lipid Clinic". Clinical Cardiology. 32 (5): 251–255. doi:10.1002/clc.20399. ISSN 0160-9289. PMC 6653569. PMID 19452482.
- Kolman, Louis; Shin, Nah-Mee; Krishnan, Sangeetha M.; Schwartz, Steven; Gracik, Theresa; Jackson, Elizabeth A.; Rubenfire, Melvyn (March 2011). "Psychological Distress in Cardiac Rehabilitation Participants". Journal of Cardiopulmonary Rehabilitation and Prevention. 31 (2): 81–86. doi:10.1097/hcr.0b013e3181f688e1. ISSN 1932-7501. PMID 21045712.

== Recognition ==
The University of Michigan has raised funds to establish a Melvyn Rubenfire Professorship of Preventive Cardiology.
