= Pulmonary Hypertension Association =

US nonprofit organization

- Abbreviation: PHA
- Legal status: 501(c)(3)
- Website: www.phassociation.org
- Formerly called: United Patients Association for Pulmonary Hypertension

The Pulmonary Hypertension Association (PHA) is a 501(c)(3) nonprofit organization that provides support, education, advocacy, and awareness association for pulmonary hypertension. It provides information to the public about the illness and acts as a support group for those with the disease, providing medical provider location services and emotional support for those suffering from the illness.

Singer Chloe Temtchine, who suffers from pulmonary venoocclusive disease (PVOD), which accounts for a small number of pulmonary hypertension cases, wrote her song "Be Brave" shortly after she was released from a hospital's critical care unit, and donates 50% of sales proceeds to the PHA.

== History ==
Three female pulmonary hypertension patients came together in 1987 with the hope of reaching other pulmonary hypertension patients. The goal was to connect pulmonary hypertension patients with one another, help locate pulmonary hypertension specialists and centers, form support groups, and publish a newsletter about the pulmonary hypertension community. In 1990, the women started a mailing newsletter, Pathlight, to about 100 people and a fourth woman soon connected with the three pulmonary hypertension patients; the United Patients Association for Pulmonary Hypertension was formed the same year. United Patients Association for Pulmonary Hypertension officially changed its name to the Pulmonary Hypertension Association (PHA) in 1997 and hired its first full-time staff member in 1999. The organization has grown to more than 16,000 members who include patients, family members, and medical professionals.
