= Melvyn =

Melvyn is a masculine given name that may refer to:

- Melvyn Betts (born 1975), English cricketer
- Melvyn Bragg (born 1939), British broadcaster and author
- Melvyn Caplan, British Conservative politician
- Mel Collins (born 1947), British saxophonist, former member of King Crimson
- Melvyn Douglas (1901-1981), American actor
- Melvyn Dubofsky (born 1934), American professor of history and sociology
- Melvyn Gale (born 1952), English cellist, former member of the Electric Light Orchestra
- Melvyn Goldstein (born 1938), American social anthropologist
- Melvyn Grant (born 1944), English artist and illustrator
- Melvyn Greaves (born 1941), British cancer biologist and professor
- Mel Gussow (1933-2005), American theater critic, movie critic, and author
- Melvyn Hayes (born 1935), English actor
- Melvyn Jaminet, (born 1999), French rugby footballer
- Melvyn Jones (born 1964), British retired slalom canoer
- Melvyn P. Leffler (born 1945), American historian and professor
- Melvyn Levitsky (born 1938), American diplomat and former ambassador
- Melvyn Lorenzen (born 1994), German-English footballer
- Mel Machin (born 1945), English former footballer and manager
- Mel Meek, Welsh rugby league footballer of the 1930s and 1940s
- Melvyn B. Nathanson (born 1944), American mathematician and professor
- Melvyn Ong, Singaporean brigadier-general and Chief of the Singapore Army beginning 2015
- Melvyn R. Paisley (1924–2001), US Assistant Secretary of the Navy convicted of taking bribes
- Melvyn Rubenfire, American cardiologist and professor
- Mel Scott (1939-1997), English footballer
- Mel Stride (born 1961), British politician
- Melvyn Tan (born 1956), Singapore-born British classical pianist
- Melvyn J Taub (born 1960), pop/rock singer
- Melvyn Weiss (1935–2018), American attorney who pleaded guilty to taking kickbacks from clients

== See also ==
- Melvin, a given name and surname
