= PVOD =

PVOD may refer to:

- Pulmonary venoocclusive disease
- Premium video on demand
- Pay-per-view video-on-demand
