= Marie-Reine =

Marie-Reine is a double-barreled feminine given name combining Marie and Reine. Notable people with the name include:

- Marie-Reine Le Gougne (born 1961), French figure skating official and figure skater
- Marie-Reine Guindorf, French writer
- Marie-Reine Hassen, Central African Republic economist, diplomat, and politician
- Marie-Reine de Jaham, Martiniquais writer
