= Rorbu =

Norwegian style of house

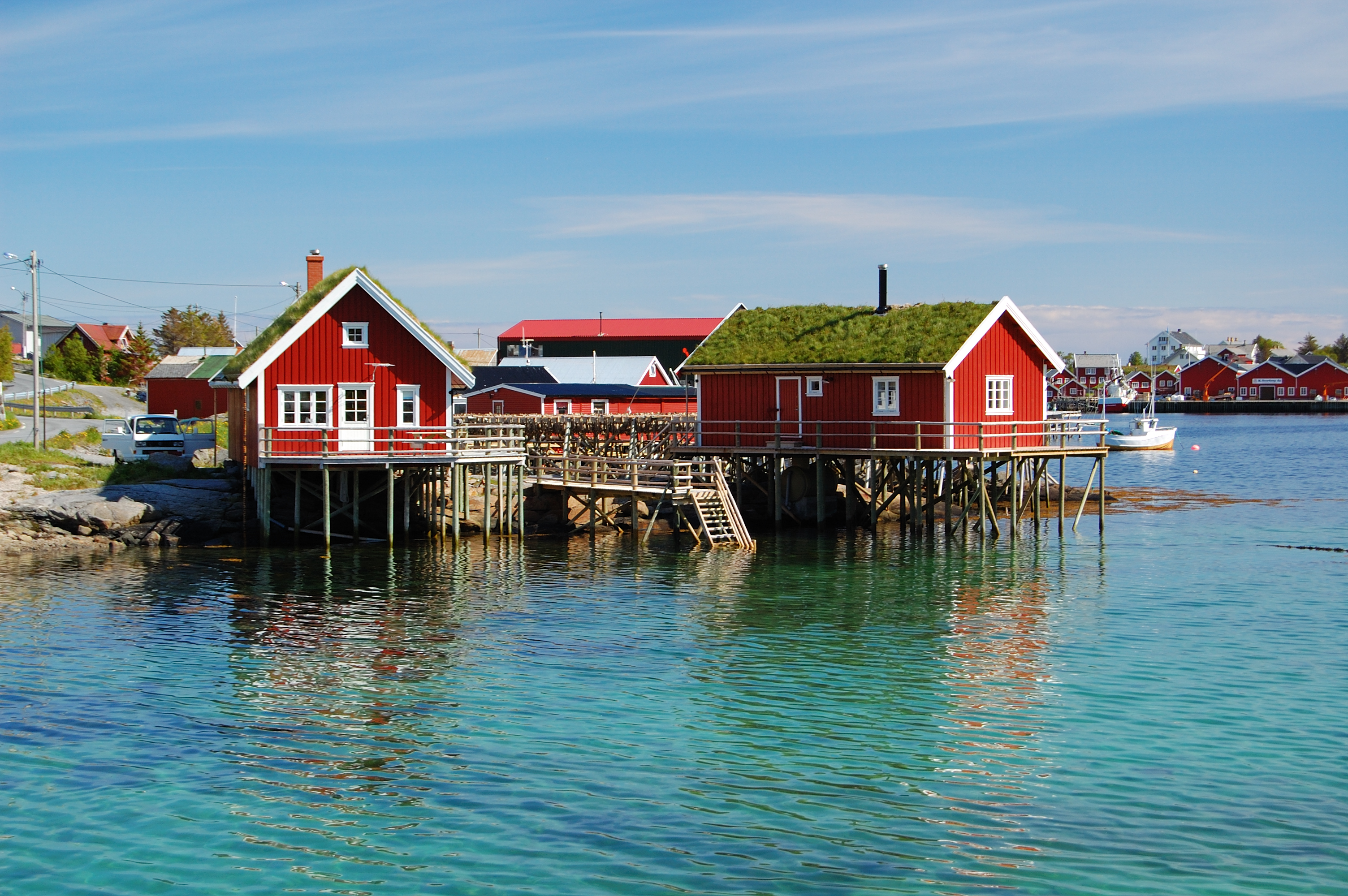
Rorbu in Reine

Rorbu is a Norwegian traditional type of seasonal house used by fishermen, normally located in a fishing village. The buildings are constructed on land, but with the one end on poles in the water, allowing easy access to vessels. The style and term is used along the coast of Western Norway and Northern Norway, and is most common on Lofoten and northwards to eastern Finnmark. The use of rorbu for fishing has diminished and the style of housing is now largely used to rent out to tourists.
