= Temtchine =

Temtchine is a surname. Notable people with the surname include:

- Chloe Temtchine (born 1982/1983), American singer-songwriter
- Sybil Temtchine, American actress
