= Mazoyer =

Mazoyer is a surname. Notable people with the surname include:

- Jacques Mazoyer (1910–2003), French sports shooter
- Reine Mazoyer, French plastic artist
