= Estienne Du Tronchet =

Estienne Du Tronchet (1510/15–1578/84) was a letter-writer and translator in Renaissance France.

== Life ==
Du Tronchet was born in Montbrison (Forez) between 1510 and 1515. Orphaned as a child, he was raised by an uncle, Jean Thevenon, who was a merchant in Roanne. Probably while still in his teens he was taken into service by Jean d'Albon de Saint-André, Governor of Lyon, as a secretary, and was employed on both diplomatic and military business. After his employer's death in 1549, he entered the service of his son, Jacques d'Albon de Saint-André, accompanying him to England and on campaign until his capture at the Battle of St. Quentin on 10 August 1557. At some point he briefly worked for Queen Mother Catherine de' Medici.

Returning to Forez after the Peace of Cateau-Cambrésis (1559), he began to live beyond his means. Discovered embezzling public funds, he went into debt to repay what he had illegally "borrowed". He narrowly escaped death at the hands of Huguenots during the Massacre of Montbrison in July 1562. His protector, Jacques d'Albon, died in the Battle of Dreux on 19 December 1562. Around 1565, Du Tronchet was imprisoned for debt. In 1569 he published a collection of letters and missives that was reprinted several times to the middle of the following century.

In need of new employment, he entered the service of the diplomat François Rougier, accompanying him to the Low Countries and then to Rome. He died in Rome, at some time between 1578 and 1584.

== Works ==
- Lettres missives et familieres (Paris, Lucas Breyer, 1569).
- Finances et thresor de la plume françoise (Paris, Nicolas du Chemin, 1572).
- Lettres amoureuses (Paris, Lucas Breyer, 1572).
- Discours académiques florentins (Paris, Lucas Breyer, 1576)
- Distiques de Caton pour les bonnes moeurs (Paris, Léon Cavellat, 1584)

== Studies ==
- Mary Saint Francis Sullivan, Étienne Du Tronchet: auteur forézien du XVIe siècle. Étude biographique et littéraire (Catholic University of America, 1931)
