= Adrian Kantrowitz =

American cardiac surgeon (1918–2008)

- Born: October 4, 1918; New York City, New York, U.S.
- Died: November 14, 2008 (aged 90); Ann Arbor, Michigan, U.S.
- Known for: Left ventricular assist device, heart transplantation
- Scientific career
- Fields: Cardiac surgeon
- Workplaces: L.VAD Technology, Inc.

Adrian Kantrowitz (October 4, 1918 – November 14, 2008) was an American cardiac surgeon whose team performed the world's second heart transplant attempt (after Christiaan Barnard) at Maimonides Medical Center in Brooklyn, New York on December 6, 1967. The infant lived for only six hours. At a press conference afterwards, Kantrowitz emphasized that he considered the operation to have been a failure.

Kantrowitz also invented the intra-aortic balloon pump (IABP), a left ventricular assist device (L-VAD), and an early version of the implantable pacemaker.

In 1981, Kantrowitz became a founding member of the World Cultural Council.

== Early life and education ==
Adrian Kantrowitz was born in New York City on October 4, 1918. His mother was a costume designer and his father ran a clinic in the Bronx, and his grandparents were from Vermont. Adrian told his mother as a three-year-old that he wanted to be a doctor, and as a child built an electrocardiograph from old radio parts, together with his brother Arthur.

He graduated from New York University in 1940, having majored in mathematics. He attended the Long Island College of Medicine (now SUNY Downstate Medical Center) and was awarded his medical degree in 1943 as part of an effort to accelerate the availability of physicians during World War II. During an internship at the Jewish Hospital of Brooklyn, he developed an interest in neurosurgery, and had a paper published in 1944, "A Method of Holding Galea Hemostats in Craniotomies", in which he proposed a new type of clamp to be used while performing a craniotomy during brain surgery.

== Early career ==
He served for two years as a battalion surgeon in the United States Army Medical Corps and was discharged from the Army in 1946 with the rank of major.

After his military service, he switched to specialize in cardiac surgery due to the paucity of positions in neurosurgery. In 1947, he was an assistant resident in surgery at Mount Sinai Hospital in Manhattan.

== Montefiore Hospital ==
Kantrowitz was on the surgical staff of Montefiore Hospital in the Bronx from 1948 until 1955. He started at Montefiore as assistant resident in surgery and pathology, and progressed to cardiovascular research fellow before becoming chief resident in surgery. At the New York Academy of Medicine, on October 16, 1951, he screened the world's first movies taken inside a living heart, showing the sequential opening and closing of the mitral valve inside a beating heart. Using dogs and other animals as experimental subjects, Kantrowitz developed an artificial left heart, an early version of an oxygen generator for use as a component in a heart-lung machine and a treatment for coronary artery disease in which blood vessels would be rearranged during surgery. He also developed a device that allowed individuals who were paralyzed to have their bladders empty through a signal sent from a radio-controlled device.

== Maimonides Medical Center and early work on left ventricular assist device (LVAD) ==
From 1955 to 1970, he held surgical posts at Maimonides Medical Center in Brooklyn. In February 1958, a heart-lung machine Kantrowitz had developed was used during open heart surgery on a six-year-old boy while the surgeons repaired a one-inch hole between the chambers of the boy's heart that was present since birth. In an October 1959 lecture at the American College of Surgeons, Kantrowitz and colleague Dr. William M. P. McKinnon reported on a procedure in which a portion of muscle from the diaphragm was used to create a "booster" heart to help pump blood in a dog, taking over as much as 25% of the pumping burden of the natural heart. The booster heart functions by receiving a signal sent by a radio transmitter triggered by the pulse of the natural heart. Kantrowitz noted that the procedure was not ready to be performed on humans. Ruff, a "friendly dog of unknown ancestry" was honored by the New York Academy of Sciences as "research dog of the year" for his unwitting participation in the implantation of a booster heart 18 months earlier in a procedure performed by Kantrowitz.

In the early 1960s, Kantrowitz developed an implantable artificial pacemaker together with General Electric. The first of these pacemakers was implanted in May 1961. The device included an external control unit that could adjust the pacing rate from 64 to 120 beats per minute to allow the patient to deal with physical or emotional stress.

Throughout the 1960s, he collaborated with a team that included his brother, engineer Arthur Kantrowitz, on the development of a left ventricular assist device. Building on his experiments with dogs, he performed the world's second permanent partial mechanical heart implantation in a human on February 4, 1966, which was successful, though the patient died 24 hours after surgery as a result of preexisting liver disease. His second implant of a partial mechanical heart on a 63-year-old woman, on May 18, 1966, lasted 13 days, until the patient died of a stroke. During these almost two weeks after the surgery, the patient was improving, and was able to sit up and eat well. This surgery used a valveless device developed with his brother Arthur in which the natural electrical impulses of the patient's heart controlled the action of the pump.

As part of Kantrowitz's research for this project, he conceived of ABO-incompatible heart transplantation, though it would be three decades before it would be put into practice.

== Worldwide context of heart transplantation ==
Dr. James Hardy had performed the world's first heart transplant attempt and first heart xenograft at the University of Mississippi Medical Center on January 24, 1964. Since there was no standard of brain death, Hardy had acquired four chimpanzees as potential back-up donors. A comatose Boyd Rush with a faint pulse had been brought to the hospital several days earlier and when he went into shock and was taken into surgery, Hardy polled the fellow doctors on his team, with three voting yes and one abstaining. Hardy and his team then proceeded with the transplant using a chimpanzee heart which beat in Rush's chest approximately 60 to 90 minutes (sources vary), and Rush died without regaining consciousness. The hospital's public relations department put out a guarded statement, with many of the early newspaper articles making the assumption that the donor was a human. In addition, when Hardy attended the Sixth International Transplantation Conference several weeks later, he was treated with "icy disdain." Hardy withdrew from active pursuit of a successful heart transplant.

In what turned out to be a four-way race between South African cardiac surgeon Dr. Christiaan Barnard and Americans Norman Shumway and Richard Lower, Kantrowitz prepared for a potential human heart transplant by transplanting hearts in 411 dogs over a five-year period together with members of his surgical team. On June 29, 1966, by which time Kantrowitz had completed the necessary technical research, one of his patients was an 18-day-old infant who very much needed a new heart. He and his team had located an anencephalic baby whose parents agreed to let her be the donor. Due to disagreements with senior staffers Howard Joos and Harry Weiss, Kantrowitz was forced to wait until cardiac death (instead of the more modern use of brain death) to retrieve the donor heart, which was found to be useless. According to the Every Second Counts: The Race to Transplant the First Human Heart (2006), Kantrowitz did not know at the time that the donor parents in Oregon both expected and wanted their baby's heart to be taken before it stopped beating (anencephalic babies typically live 24 to 48 hours). Barnard performed the first human-to-human heart transplant with an adult donor and recipient on December 3, 1967, at Groote Schuur Hospital in Cape Town, South Africa.

Worldwide, especially following Barnard's December 1967 transplant, there were more than 100 transplants were performed by various doctors during 1968. However, only a third of these patients lived longer than three months.

== Kantrowitz's 1967 pediatric heart transplant attempt at Maimonides ==
On December 6, 1967, at Maimonides Medical Center, Kantrowitz's team, including Bjørnstad PG, Lindberg HL, Smevik B, Rian R, Sørland SJ, Tjønneland S, performed the world's first pediatric heart transplant attempt as well as the first human-to-human heart transplant in the United States.

=== The donor ===
David McIntire Bashaw who was anencephalic baby. His brain was "grossly malformed," and he had a poor Moro reflex (infant's startle response). However, Bashaw could move his extremities and had a feeble cry.

Some fundamentalist preachers raised theological issues with heart transplants. However, Bashaw's grandfather was well-known fundamentalist pastor Carl McIntire, and publicly countered the biblical arguments against it.

=== The recipient ===
The recipient infant was 19-day-old Jamie Scudero who had the heart conditions of tricuspid atresia and Ebstein's anomaly. At 3:45 a.m., the cooling procedure began.

=== The procedure ===
According to Every Second Counts, both this infant and the recipient infant had their body temperatures cooled from 98.6 to 59 °F (from 37 to 15 °C), at which time surgeons then waited for the donor baby's heart to stop beating.

At 4:25 a.m., the Bashaw baby flat-lined, and Jordan Haller removed his heart. He and Kantrowitz sutured the heart into Scudero's chest. This took 40 minutes. Kantrowitz was relying on hypothermia alone for Scudero which meant the entire operation needed to be completed in less than an hour. The team then warmed Scudero to 79 °F (26 °C), at which point they administered an electrical shock to the heart and it began to beat. Scudero lived for a little more than six hours, and then his new heart stopped beating and could not be restarted. At a press conference, Kantrowitz emphasized that he did not view the operation as a success.

Alex Faltine was the head technician and was responsible for re-warming Scudero. During the procedure, a connector between two hot water pipes came loose. Faltine simply held it in place with his thinly-gloved hands and didn't say anything to slow down the operation. Afterwards, Haller was astonished to see his blistered hands and asked Faltine how long he had had to hold the pipes together. Faltine, a man in his fifties who occasionally showed off by doing one-armed push-ups in the hallway, simply shrugged it off.

== Pump to assist heart ==
The intra-aortic balloon pump was invented by Kantrowitz, working in conjunction with his brother, Arthur Kantrowitz. Inserted through the patient's thigh, it was directed into the aorta, and alternately expanded and contracted in order to reduce strain on the heart. Based on Kantrowitz's theory of "counterpulsation", the device inflated the balloon with helium gas when the heart relaxed and deflated it when the heart pumped blood. The pump did not require surgery and could be inserted using local anesthetic in an emergency room or at a patient's bedside. The device was first used in August 1967 to save the life of a 45-year-old woman who was having a heart attack. The device could be used in the 15% of heart attack patients who went into severe shock, 80% of whom could not be helped by the protocols that existed before the balloon pump. Since the device went into widespread use in the 1980s, it had been used in some three million patients by the time of his death.

== Sinai Hospital ==
He and his entire team of surgeons, researchers, biomedical engineers, and nurses relocated to Sinai Hospital (now Sinai-Grace Hospital) in Detroit in 1970, where he assumed the position of attending surgeon and chairman of the Department of Surgery.

At Sinai Hospital, Kantrowitz experimented further with heart transplants and continued development of the balloon pump, and partial mechanical hearts. In August 1971, he implanted an artificial heart booster in a 63-year-old man whose weakened heart could not pump sufficient oxygenated blood to his body. The patient became the first partial mechanical heart patient to be sent home, and died three months after the surgery.

== Personal life, heart failure, and death ==
Kantrowitz married Jean Rosensaft on November 25, 1948. His wife was an administrator on the surgical research laboratories at Maimonides Medical Center while he was there. In 1983, they co-founded L.VAD Technology, Inc., a company specializing in research and development of cardiovascular devices, with Kantrowitz as president and his wife as vice president.

Kantrowitz died at age 90 in Ann Arbor, Michigan, on November 14, 2008, of heart failure.

== Awards and honors ==
- Golden Plate Award of the American Academy of Achievement (1966)
