= Avon Voices =

- Genre: Reality competition
- Created by: John de Mol
- Judges: David Pack; Delta Goodrem; Diane Warren; Diego Torres; Fergie; Ivete Sangalo; Lea Salonga; Maía; Natasha Bedingfield; Sheila E.; Valeriya
- Country of origin: United States
- Original language: English
- No. of seasons: 1

Production
- Producers: Ashley Baumann; Bart Kimball
- Production locations: Los Angeles, California
- Camera setup: Multi-camera
- Running time: 20 minutes
- Production company: Avon

Original release
- Network: Avon Website
- Release: March 8 – November 2, 2011

Avon Voices was a global online talent search for women and songwriting contest for men and women that took place across 62 countries and 37 languages, from December 2010 through November 2011.

== Process ==
There were over 10,000 submissions. 178 singers were flown around the world for 20 live and staged shows. Avon Voices culminated in the selection of two singing winners and two winning songwriting songs on November 2, 2011.

== Judges ==
The international panel of artists judges included:

- David Pack
- Delta Goodrem
- Diane Warren
- Diego Torres
- Fergie
- Ivete Sangalo
- Lea Salonga
- Maía
- Natasha Bedingfield
- Sheila E.
- Valeriya

== Winners ==
The two singing winners, Selena Gittens (Canada) and Evelina Anusauskaite (Lithuania), were announced at the annual Avon Foundation for Women Gala on November 2, 2011 in New York City. The event and announcement were streamed live via LiveStream.

The grand-prize-winning songwriting songs, "Step Up" (by Chloe Temtchine and Kyle Kelso) and "We All Fall Down" (by Ilene Angel and Sue Fabisch) were premiered at the Avon Foundation Gala, as well as a new original Avon Voices Anthem, written by Diane Warren, entitled "Be What You Believe."

== Notability ==
Avon Voices is believed to be the largest and most expansive global online singing competition ever held. 178 women were flown over 1,000,000 miles to 1 of 6 major world cities over the course of the competition. Over 2,500,000 votes were cast online throughout the duration of the program. The Avon Voices website, the first ever website to simultaneously push in 37 languages, was visited by fans in over 213 countries and territories.

== Controversy ==
On November 3, 2011, Avon issued a formal press release regarding the selection of the winners. The press release stated that "as part of the winnings, Selena (Gittens) and Evelina (Anusauskaite) will record a fully produced album that will be sold through Avon distribution channels in select markets and a portion of the proceeds from the anthem sale in 2012 will go to the Avon Foundation for Women." At present, the album has yet to be distributed or sold.
