= Victor de Laprade =

French poet and critic (1812–1883)

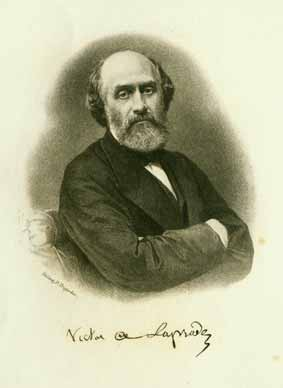
Victor de Laprade

Pierre Martin Victor Richard de Laprade (French pronunciation: [pjɛʁ maʁtɛ̃ viktɔʁ ʁiʃaʁ də lapʁad]; 13 January 1812 – 13 December 1883), known as Victor de Laprade, was a French poet and critic.

== Biography ==
He was born at Montbrison, Loire, of a modest provincial family. After completing his studies at Lyon, he produced, in 1839, a small volume of religious verse, Les Parfums de Madeleine. This was followed in 1840 by La colère de Jesus, in 1841 by the religious fantasy of Psyche, and in 1844 by Odes et poèmes. In 1845 Laprade visited Italy on a mission of literary research, and in 1847 he was appointed professor of French literature at Lyon. The Académie française, by a single vote, preferred Émile Augier at the election in 1857, but in the following year Laprade was chosen to fill the place vacated by Alfred de Musset.

In 1861 Laprade was removed from his post at Lyon owing to the publication of a poem satirising the Second Empire (Les Musées d'Etat), and in 1871 was elected to the National Assembly as a conservative. A statue was erected in his memory at Montbrison.

Besides those named above, Laprade's poetic works include Poèmes évangéliques (1852), Idylles héroïques (1858), Les Voix du silence (1864), Pernette (1868), Poèmes civiles (1873), Le Livre d'un père (1877), Varia and Livre des adieux (1878–1879).

His prose works include Des habitudes intellectuelles de l'avocat (1840), Questions d'art et de morale (1861), Le Sentiment de la nature, avant le Christianisme in 1866, Chez les modernes in 1868, and Education libérale in 1873. In some cases these works had been previously printed after delivery as a lecture. He also contributed articles to the Revue des deux mondes and the Revue de Paris.

Laprade's subject was French provincial life, its culture, its piety, and its sober patriotism. His poetry belongs to the school of Chateaubriand and Alphonse de Lamartine, imitating classical models, inspired by a sense of the ideal, and worshipping nature as revealing the divine. However, he never attained a great level of popularity. His work has much in common with the English Lake School.

Laprade's prose criticisms consist of classical and metaphysical studies, as well as wide-ranging commentary on European literature. He disliked irony and skepticism, which probably lead him to underrate 18th-century literature.
