= Sarah Mikovski =

- Origin: Lyon, France
- Genres: Nouvelle Chanson, jazz
- Years active: 2014–present
- Label: Label 440
- Website: http://www.sarah-mikovski.com

Sarah Mikovski, is a French singer-songwriter based in Lyon.

== Career ==
Mikovski was classically trained at the Maîtrise de la Loire in Montbrison. She went on to study at the Conservatoire de Lyon, where she became influenced by jazz and funk. She describes her sound as "poptimistic".

She composes her songs a cappella while walking, and performs as a duo with Ivan Callot, who does the arrangements. For her pseudonym, she chose a Polish-sounding last name as a way to "break all stereotypes" and create a persona allowing her to have more fun in her shows. Mikovski describes herself as a "beast on stage".

Mikovski is influenced by artists such as Ella Fitzgerald, Pomme, Camille, and Janelle Monáe.

Mikovski has earned several awards for her music, including the Centre de la Chanson de Paris' grand prize in 2015.

== Discography ==
- Sarah Mikovski (2014)
- Ressuscitée (2015)
- Ma Vie en Rose (2016)
- Pôle nord (sortie prévue le 14 février 2020)
