= Reine (name) =

Reine can be a feminine given name or a surname. Notable people with the name include:

== Mononym ==
- Regina of Autun (French: Sainte Reine), French-born Catholic martyr

== Nickname ==
- Sixte Coupal dit la Reine, Canadian farmer and political figure

== Given name ==
- Reine Abbas, Lebanese video game designer and artist
- Reine Alapini-Gansou, Beninese judge
- Reine Almqvist (born 1949), Swedish football coach and striker
- Reine Andersson (1945–2005), Swedish sailor
- Reine Antier, French Roman Catholic nun
- Reine Audu, French fruit seller and revolutionary
- Reine Barkered (born 1982), Swedish big mountain skier
- Reine Brynolfsson, Swedish actor
- Reine Davies, American singer and actress
- Reine Feldt (1945–1986), Swedish football defender and journalist
- Reine Fiske, Swedish guitarist
- Reine Flachot, French cellist
- Reine Gianoli, French classical pianist
- Reine Hibiki, Japanese illustrator
- Reine Mazoyer, French plastic artist
- Reine Arcache Melvin, Filipina-American author
- Reine Ngotala, Gabonese beauty pageant titleholder
- Reine Colaço Osorio-Swaab, Dutch composer
- Reine Sosso (born 1993), Cameroonian football goalkeeper
- Reine Swart, South African director, writer, and actress
- Reine Philiberte de Varicourt, French woman of letters
- Reine Wisell (1941–2022), Swedish racing driver

== Surname ==
- Paul Reine, Norwegian forester and politician
- Yannick Reine (born 1987), French kickboxer
