= Reine =

Reine can refer to:

- French for queen regnant
- Reine (name), feminine given name and surname
- Reine, Norway, village in Moskenes municipality, Nordland county, Norway

- Reine Church, church in the village

- Reine (song), song by French rapper Dadju
