= Leslie ZumBrunnen =

American politician

Member of the Wyoming House of Representatives from Niobrara County
- In office 1967–1976
- Preceded by: James L. Thompson
- Succeeded by: Kenneth Gropp

Personal details
- Born: Leslie Lee ZumBrunnen; April 22, 1908 Kirtley, Wyoming, U.S.
- Died: January 9, 1997 (aged 88) Torrington, Wyoming, U.S.
- Party: Republican
- Children: Melvin ZumBrunnen
- Education: Kearney State Teachers College

Leslie Lee ZumBrunnen (April 22, 1908 – January 9, 1997) was an American politician. A member of the Republican Party, he served in the Wyoming House of Representatives from 1967 to 1976.

== Life and career ==
ZumBrunnen was born in Kirtley, Wyoming, the son of Roy and Bama ZumBrunnen. He attended Sioux County High School, graduating in 1928. After graduating, he attended Kearney State Teachers College, earning his degree in 1932, which after earning his degree, he worked as a rancher in Lusk, Wyoming.

ZumBrunnen served in the Wyoming House of Representatives from 1967 to 1976.

== Death ==
ZumBrunnen died on January 9, 1997, at the Community Hospital in Torrington, Wyoming, at the age of 88.
