= Montbrison, Loire =

Montbrison Montbréson (Arpitan)
- Subprefecture and commune
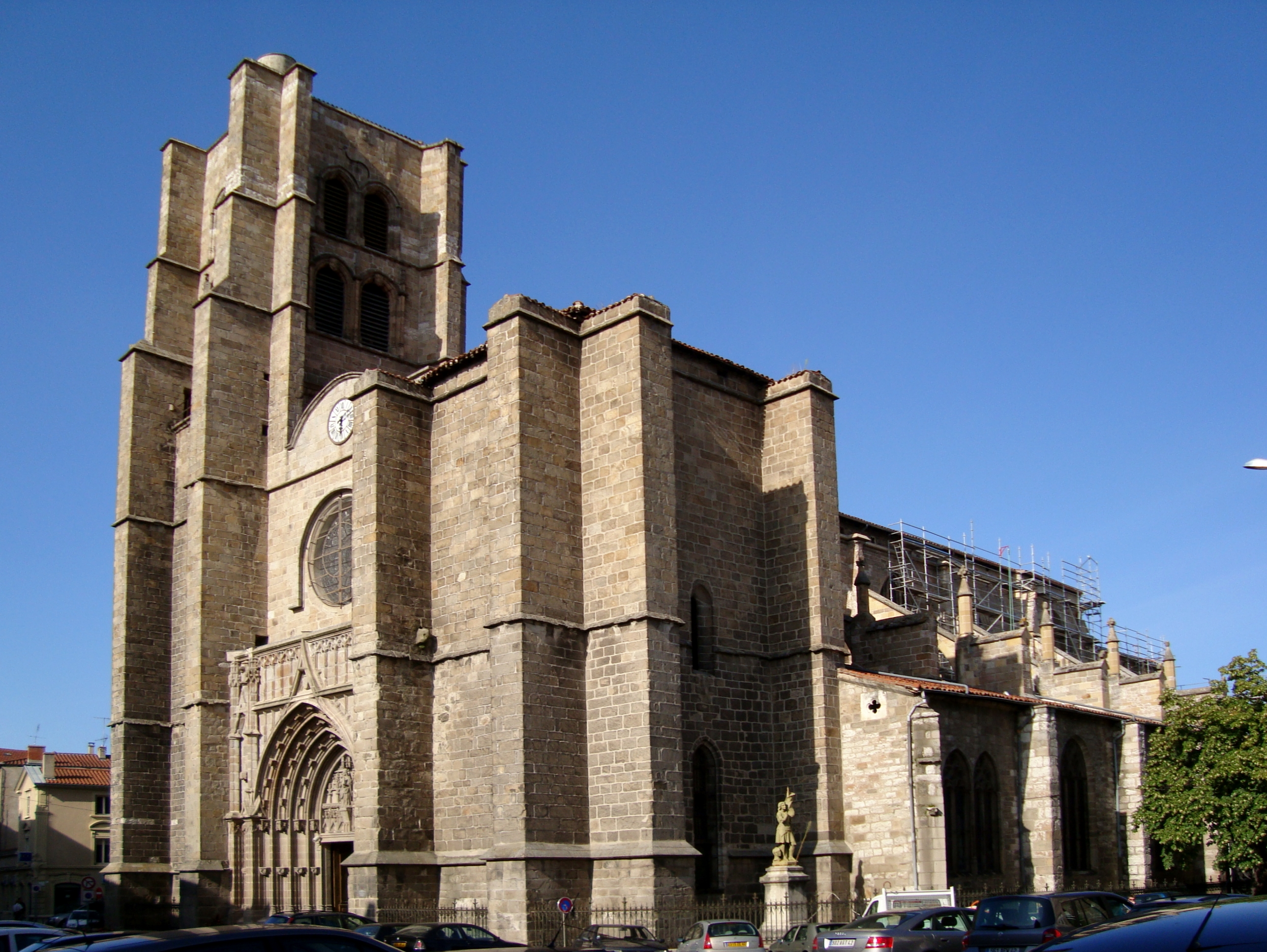
- Collégiale Notre-Dame d'Espérance de Montbrison

- Coat of arms
- Location of Montbrison
- Location within France Location within Auvergne-Rhône-Alpes
- Coordinates: 45°36′30″N 4°03′57″E
- Country: France
- Region: Auvergne-Rhône-Alpes
- Department: Loire
- Arrondissement: Montbrison
- Canton: Montbrison
- Intercommunality: CA Loire Forez

Government
  - Mayor (2020–2026): Christophe Bazile (DVD)
- Area^{1}: 16.33 km^{2} (6.31 sq mi)
- Elevation: 399 m (1,309 ft)
- Highest elevation: 552 m (1,811 ft)
- Lowest elevation: 370 m (1,210 ft)
- Population (2023): 16,123
  - Density: 987.3/km^{2} (2,557/sq mi)
- Demonym: Montbrisonnais
- Time zone: UTC+01:00 (CET)
  - Summer (DST): UTC+02:00 (CEST)
- INSEE/Postal code: 42147 /42600
- Website: ville-montbrison.fr
- ^{1} French Land Register data, which excludes lakes, ponds, glaciers > 1 km^{2} (0.386 sq mi or 247 acres) and river estuaries.

Montbrison (French pronunciation: [mɔ̃bʁizɔ̃]; Arpitan: Montbréson) is a subprefecture and commune of the Loire department in central France. Montbrison was the historical capital of the counts of Forez; today it is the principal city in Forez.

The city gives its name to the popular blue cheese Fourme de Montbrison, which has been made in the region for centuries. It received appellation d'origine contrôlée status in 1972.

== History ==
The town of Montbrison was founded in the area around the lords' castles in the Forez region, of which Montbrison would later become the capital. The earliest recorded reference to the town dates to 870CE.

The town was fortified following the attacks by the English army at the start of the Hundred Years War. During the Religious Wars, Montbrison was captured and pillaged by the Protestant forces of François de Beaumont in 1562, with the town's garrison thrown from the ramparts onto spikes placed by the attackers.

The Convent of the Visitation was founded in 1643 during a period of severe famine. The town suffered a series of poor harvests as well as an outbreak of the plague between the years 1648–1653. The Augustinian Convent was founded in 1654, followed by the Hospital to house the poor in 1659. The Ursuline Convent closed in 1851.

In 1973 Montbrison absorbed the former commune Moingt.

=== Key dates ===
- 1892 - execution of Ravachol, a noted anarchist
- 1909 - electrical power reaches the town
- 1940 - (June) the Forez region is occupied by German troops, with Montbrison falling into the 'free' zone. The forces withdrew at the start of July
- 1944 - (August) Montbrison liberated
- 1954 - Water treatment plant built
- 1968 - Jacquou le Croquant broadcast on television
- 1972 - local cheese Fourme de Montbrison receives Appellation d'Origine Contrôlée status

== Population ==
Historical population
Year	Pop.	±% p.a.
1968	11,213	—
1975	12,451	+1.51%
1982	13,280	+0.93%
1990	14,064	+0.72%
1999	14,589	+0.41%
2007	15,010	+0.36%
2012	15,414	+0.53%
2017	15,641	+0.29%
2023	16,123	+0.51%
Source: INSEE

== Twin towns ==
Montbrison is twinned with:

- Sežana, Slovenia
- Eichstätt, Germany

== Personalities ==
- Christophe Agou (1969–), photographer
- Pierre Boulez (1925–2016), composer and conductor
- Guillaume Cizeron (1994–), ice dancer, two-time Olympic champion (2022), Olympic silver medalist (2018), five-time world champion (2015, 2016, 2018, 2019, 2022) and five-time European champion (2015–2019)
- Philippe Delaye (1975–), footballer
- Estienne Du Tronchet (c.1510–c.1580), writer
- Victor de Laprade (1812–1882) poet
- Mickey 3D, pop group
- Sarah Mikovski, singer-songwriter
- Marie-Anne Pierrette Paulze (1758–1836), wife of Antoine Lavoisier
- Michael Portier, Bishop of Mobile, Alabama
- Ravachol, anarchist
- Muriel Robin (born 1955), actress
- Yves Triantafyllos (1948–), footballer
- Reine Mazoyer (1944–), artist, set designer and book illustrator

== Climate ==
Climate data for Montbrison (Savigneux), elevation 370 m (1,210 ft), (1991–2020 normals, extremes 1974–present)
Month	Jan	Feb	Mar	Apr	May	Jun	Jul	Aug	Sep	Oct	Nov	Dec	Year
Record high °C (°F)	19.9 (67.8)	23.2 (73.8)	27.0 (80.6)	29.2 (84.6)	33.1 (91.6)	38.2 (100.8)	41.0 (105.8)	41.2 (106.2)	35.6 (96.1)	32.9 (91.2)	25.0 (77.0)	20.5 (68.9)	41.2 (106.2)
Mean daily maximum °C (°F)	7.3 (45.1)	8.8 (47.8)	13.0 (55.4)	16.2 (61.2)	20.2 (68.4)	24.2 (75.6)	26.5 (79.7)	26.5 (79.7)	21.9 (71.4)	17.2 (63.0)	11.4 (52.5)	7.9 (46.2)	16.8 (62.2)
Daily mean °C (°F)	3.1 (37.6)	3.8 (38.8)	7.1 (44.8)	9.8 (49.6)	13.8 (56.8)	17.7 (63.9)	19.7 (67.5)	19.3 (66.7)	15.3 (59.5)	11.7 (53.1)	6.9 (44.4)	3.9 (39.0)	11.0 (51.8)
Mean daily minimum °C (°F)	−1.0 (30.2)	−1.1 (30.0)	1.1 (34.0)	3.4 (38.1)	7.5 (45.5)	11.3 (52.3)	12.8 (55.0)	12.1 (53.8)	8.6 (47.5)	6.2 (43.2)	2.3 (36.1)	−0.2 (31.6)	5.2 (41.4)
Record low °C (°F)	−23.6 (−10.5)	−17.1 (1.2)	−14.0 (6.8)	−8.5 (16.7)	−4.0 (24.8)	1.3 (34.3)	2.8 (37.0)	1.2 (34.2)	−2.0 (28.4)	−9.6 (14.7)	−12.0 (10.4)	−16.4 (2.5)	−23.6 (−10.5)
Average precipitation mm (inches)	35.9 (1.41)	27.5 (1.08)	31.0 (1.22)	46.2 (1.82)	74.0 (2.91)	76.0 (2.99)	73.8 (2.91)	68.0 (2.68)	65.0 (2.56)	69.8 (2.75)	61.0 (2.40)	37.2 (1.46)	665.4 (26.20)
Average precipitation days (≥ 1.0 mm)	8.1	6.5	6.9	8.4	9.6	8.3	7.8	7.8	7.3	8.5	8.7	7.8	95.8
Source: Meteociel
