= Justice Melvin =

Justice Melvin may refer to:

- Henry A. Melvin (1865–1920), associate justice of the Supreme Court of California
- Joan Orie Melvin (born 1956), associate justice of the Pennsylvania Supreme Court
- Ridgely P. Melvin (1881–1945), associate justice of the Maryland Court of Appeals
