= John Melvin =

John Melvin may refer to:

- John Melvin (architect) – British architect, town planner, and author
- John Melvin (engineer) (1938–2014) – automotive safety engineer for General Motors and NASCAR
- John Melvin (naval officer) (1887–1917) – first American naval officer to die in World War I
- John Melvin (rower) – British lightweight rower
