= Melvin ZumBrunnen =

American politician

Member of the Wyoming House of Representatives
- In office 1983–1992

Personal details
- Born: May 27, 1941 (age 85) Lusk, Wyoming, U.S.
- Party: Republican; Independent
- Parent: Leslie ZumBrunnen (father)
- Education: University of Wyoming

Melvin ZumBrunnen (born May 27, 1941) is an American politician. He served as a member of the Wyoming House of Representatives.

== Life and career ==
ZumBrunnen was born in Lusk, Wyoming. He attended Niobrara County High School and the University of Wyoming.

ZumBrunnen served in the Wyoming House of Representatives from 1983 to 1992.
