= Donation after circulatory death =

Organ donation from a donor whose heartbeat has stopped

Donation after circulatory death (DCD), also known as non-heart-beating donation, is the process of organ donation for transplant in which organs are recovered from the deceased donor after their circulation and breathing have stopped (circulatory death), as opposed to donation after death by neurological criteria (brain death). The majority of DCD donors are critical care patients who have a non-survivable injury and grave prognosis, whose legal next of kin has decided to remove life-sustaining therapies and allow for natural death. In DCD cases, prior to removing life-sustaining therapies, tests are done to assess viability of organs and to find matching recipients. After cardiac death has been determined, the DCD donor is then taken to surgery to recover organs for transplant.

Prior to the legal recognition of brain death, all organ donors were non-heart-beating donors, as their organs were recovered after they had cardiac cessation. While donation after brain death does tend to have better results for recipients due to increased control over the amount of time organs are without oxygenation, donation after circulatory death is a common pathway for organ donation.

Tissue donation is possible for both brain death donors and DCD donors, as tissue recovery can generally occur up to 24-hours after cardiac cessation.

== Maastricht classification ==
DCD donors are grouped by the Maastricht classification: developed at Maastricht in the Netherlands. in 1995 during the first International Workshop on Non-Heart‐Beating donors.

I	Brought in dead	$\bigg \}$	uncontrolled
II	Unsuccessful resuscitation	$\bigg \}$	uncontrolled
III	Awaiting cardiac arrest		controlled
IV	Cardiac arrest after brain-stem death		uncontrolled
V	Cardiac arrest in a hospital inpatient		uncontrolled (added in 2000)

Categories I, II, IV and V are termed uncontrolled and category III is controlled.

As of yet, only tissues such as heart valves, skin and corneas can be taken from category I donors. Category II donors are patients who have had a witnessed cardiac arrest outside hospital, have cardiopulmonary resuscitation by CPR-trained providers commenced within 10 minutes but who cannot be successfully resuscitated. Category III donors are patients on intensive care units with nonsurvivable injuries who have treatment withdrawn; where such patients wished in life to be organ donors, the transplant team can attend at the time of treatment withdrawal and retrieve organs after cardiac arrest has occurred.

Maastricht definitions were reevaluated after the 6th International Conference in Organ Donation held in Paris in 2013 and a consensus agreement of an established expert European Working Group on the definitions and terminology were standardized, and later the word "retrieved" (organ) was substituted for "recovered" throughout the text.

== Organs that can be used ==
Kidneys can be used from category II donors, and all organs except the heart can potentially be used from category III, IV and V donors. An unsuccessful kidney recipient can remain on dialysis, unlike recipients of some other organs, meaning that a failure will not result in death.

Kidneys from uncontrolled (category II) donors must be assessed with care as there is otherwise a high rate of failure. Many centres have protocols for formal viability assessment. Relatively few centres worldwide retrieve such kidneys, and leaders in this field include the transplant units in Maastricht (the Netherlands), Newcastle upon Tyne and Leicester (United Kingdom), Madrid and Barcelona (Spain), Pavia (Italy) and Washington, DC (United States).

Livers and lungs for transplant can only be taken from controlled donors, and are still somewhat experimental as they have only been performed successfully in relatively few centres. In the United Kingdom, NHBD liver transplants are currently performed in Addenbrooke's Hospital Cambridge, Queen Elizabeth Hospital Birmingham, King's College Hospital London, St. James's University Hospital, Leeds, Newcastle upon Tyne and the Scottish Liver Transplant Unit in Edinburgh. In other countries such as Spain, currently up to one-third of transplants are performed with NHBD. The International Meeting on Transplantation from Non-Heart-Beating Donors is organised in the UK every two years and brings together specialists in transplantation including transplant physicians, surgeons, fellows, nurses, coordinators, intensive care physicians, perfusion technicians, ethicists, and researchers interested in the aspects of retrieval, preservation and transplantation of DCD thoracic and abdominal organs and cells.

Lectures are held by experts on the most challenging themes such as clinical outcomes of transplantation of controlled and uncontrolled DCD organs, progress made on machine perfusion of kidneys, livers, lungs and hearts and ethics and legal issues regarding donation after cardiac death.

== Procedure for uncontrolled donors ==
Following declaration of death, cardiopulmonary resuscitation (CPR) is continued until the transplant team arrive. A stand-off period is observed after cessation of CPR to confirm that death has occurred; this is usually from 5 to 10 minutes in length and varies according to local protocols.

Once the stand-off period has elapsed, a cut down is performed over the femoral artery, and a double-balloon triple-lumen (DBTL) catheter is inserted into the femoral artery and passed into the aorta. The balloons are inflated to occlude the aorta above and below the renal arteries (any donor blood specimens required can be taken before the top balloon is inflated). A pre-flush with streptokinase or another thrombolytic is given through the catheter, followed by 20 litres of cold kidney perfusion fluid; the opening of the lumen is between the balloons so that most of the flush and perfusion fluid goes into the kidneys. Another catheter is inserted into the femoral vein to allow venting of the fluid.

Once full formal consent for organ donation has been obtained from relatives, and other necessary formalities such as identification of the deceased by the police and informing the Coroner (in the UK), the donor is taken to the operating room, and the kidneys and heart valves retrieved.

== Procedure for controlled donors ==
If the liver or lungs are felt to be suitable for transplantation, then the donor is usually taken directly to the operating room after cardiac arrest, and a rapid retrieval operation is performed once a 10-minute stand-off period has elapsed. It seems this stand-off period has been reduced to as short as 75 seconds based on a recent article by the CBC. This is now causing an ethical debate as to whether physicians will declare death sooner than is currently required. This is similar to a normal multi-organ retrieval, but prioritises rapid cannulation, perfusion and cooling with ice, with dissection following later.

If only the kidneys are suitable for retrieval, either rapid retrieval or cannulation with DBTL catheter can be used. Use of a DBTL catheter allows relatives of the deceased to see them after death, but the donor must be taken to the operating room as soon as possible.

Category IV donors (who are already brain-stem dead), should either proceed as for a normal multi-organ retrieval—if this has already started—or should be managed as a category II or III as appropriate to the circumstances of cardiac arrest.

== Ethical issues ==
Certain ethical issues are raised by NHBD transplantation such as administering drugs which do not benefit the donor, observance of the Dead-donor Rule, the decision-making surrounding resuscitation, the withdrawal of life-support, the respect for a dying patient and the dead body, as well as proper information for the family. In 2016 author Dale Gardiner issued a report called "How the UK Overcame the Ethical, Legal and Professional Challenges in Donation After Circulatory Death".

== Actions prior to consent ==
In category II uncontrolled donors, the donor may die and the transplant team arrive before the donor's next-of-kin can be contacted. It is controversial whether cannulation and perfusion can be started in these circumstances. On one hand, it can be considered a violation of the potential donor's autonomy to cannulate before their in-life wishes are known. On the other hand, delay in cannulation may mean that a patient's strongly held wish to be donor cannot be respected. Many ethicists also feel that a doctor's duty of care to the still living outweighs any duty of care to the dead. The compromise reached is usually to cannulate if there is any evidence of a wish to donate (such as a donor card or registration as a donor) even in the absence of next-of-kin.

For category III donors, treatment is being withdrawn from a living person, who will then die and become a donor. Important factors for assessment include A) that the decisions regarding nonsurvivable injuries are correct, B) continued treatment is futile and C) that withdrawal is in the patient's best interests be made completely independently of any consideration of suitability as an organ donor. Only after such decisions have been firmly made should a patient be considered as a potential organ donor. Although such treatment can be continued until the transplant team arrives, no additional treatment should be started to improve the organs—until the point of death, the patient should be treated exactly as any other dying patient.

The standard recommendation to ensure this is to require a complete separation of the treatment and organ procurement teams. It is not, however, clear how complete this separation can be in those jurisdictions that require hospitals to report the names of candidates for organ donation to an Organ Procurement Organization (OPO) before life support has been withdrawn so that organ donation can be discussed with surrogates. This forces treating physicians to view their patients partly as potential organ donors, and even absent an OPO, it is unrealistic to think treating physicians are not aware of benefits to others of transplantation, and sometimes weigh this against the benefit of continued treatment to the patient. As one author puts it: "If the person in need of organ transplantation is younger, more attractive, or in some way more deserving than another critically ill patient"—and there are always such patients awaiting transplants—"then the conclusion that one patient's condition is hopeless can be tainted by an understanding of the tremendous hope organ availability holds for another."

Factored into this is the element of judgement that physicians bring to evaluating the "best interest" of patients. There is considerable variability among physicians in determining from whom to withdraw life-sustaining treatments in the ICU. Bias has been demonstrated on the part of medical professionals against patients who are perceived as disabled or are otherwise stigmatized. Studies have shown that, when evaluating the quality of life of severely disabled patients, physicians consistently apply much poorer rating than do the patients themselves. This raises the question: Would prejudice about vulnerable patients, such as disabled people, lead medical professionals to approach such individuals and families for NHBD more than others with higher "quality of life" ratings? Thus, as Doig puts it: "…the possibility of conflicted decision-making in a controlled DCD program is more than a theoretical possibility." The upshot is that the mere existence of a NHBD program in a hospital potentially compromises the care of patients. Few have rejected those programs on this basis, but the question of how to protect against it is ongoing.

== Dead donor rule ==
The so-called "dead donor rule" (DDR) requires that persons be dead before their organs can be taken, and this rule is basic to all DCD programs. Also common to all DCD programs is that death is determined by cardiocirculatory criteria according to which life-support is withdrawn, an interval of the monitored absence of pulse, blood pressure, and respiration observed, and then death declared. Programs differ, however, on the length of the interval. The Pittsburgh Protocol requires 2 minutes, the Institute of Medicine (IOM) and Canadian Council for Donation and Transplantation (CCDT) 5 minutes, the 1981 President's Commission 10 minutes, and recently Boucek et al. have proposed that it can be shortened to 75 seconds.

These times are based on estimates of when autoresuscitation (i.e., the spontaneous recovery of circulatory activity) becomes impossible. The scientific validity of all these times, however, has been questioned. The IOM in 2000 concluded that "existing empirical data cannot confirm or disprove a specific interval at which the cessation of cardiopulmonary function becomes irreversible." In addition, none of these intervals precludes the possibility of CPR restoring cardiocirculatory activity. To preclude that, brain death is required. The exact interval at which that occurs is likewise not known, but it is known to be more than 10 minutes. In light of this we can now raise the question of whether patients declared dead by cardiocirculatory criteria are really dead. It is generally agreed that death occurs when the patient is in an irreversible state. Whether patients declared dead by cardiocirculatory criteria are really dead thus depends on what is meant by "irreversible," and the term is open to a stronger and weaker interpretation.

On the stronger interpretation "irreversibility" means that spontaneous cardiocirculation "cannot be restored no matter what intervention is done, including CPR." On the weaker interpretation it means that spontaneous cardiocirculation "cannot be restored because CPR efforts have been refused by the patient (as a DNR order in an advance directive), by a surrogate decision-maker or by the medical team because it is not medically indicated." Thus the person need not be in a physically irreversible state, but only in a morally or legally irreversible state.

On the weaker interpretation, persons declared dead by DCD cardiocirculatory criteria cannot be known to be dead, as it is not always physically impossible to restore circulation by vigorous CPR. The weaker interpretation, however, does allow persons declared dead by DCD criteria to be counted as dead. It is often objected that this interpretation does not accord with the everyday meaning of death. Ordinarily we do not think that persons are dead when we have reasons not to revive them, but only when they cannot physically be revived. Nonetheless, declaring persons dead for purposes of transplantation by DCD criteria is "accepted medical practice" in many parts of the world, and where it is (as in Canada, for example) the legal standard for declaring death is met.

The upshot is that we cannot straightforwardly say whether DCD violates the DDR. Whether it does or not depends on whether we think this requires that people be dead in the ordinary sense of the word or in a legal or some other understanding of it, and writers are lined up on both sides of this issue.

== Pain and suffering ==
Controlled DCD may involve interventions such as vessel cannulation before life-sustaining therapy is withdrawn and death is declared, and may also involve post-mortem interventions such as in situ preservation. Uncontrolled DCD may additionally involve chest compressions and mechanical ventilation both before and after consent for DCD is obtained and typically requires the withdrawal of life-sustaining treatment. We know that all of these interventions cause distress to conscious patients who are not taking palliative medications. Thus, because patients who are candidates for DCD are not known to be brain dead either before or shortly after they are declared dead by cardiocirculatory criteria, the possibility that they may experience distress must be considered.

There are three approaches that have been taken to this possibility of pain and suffering: (1) provide palliative medications where there are physical signs compatible with distress; (2) withhold all such medications on the ground that even if signs of distress are occurring, the patient does not have sufficient cognition to interpret any sensations as noxious; or (3) provide palliative medications prophylactically to prevent any possible distress. Whichever approach is adopted, worries have been expressed over whether patients can be guaranteed not to experience any distress. Re: (1) providing medication only on signs compatible with distress does not prevent the possibility of distress. Re: (2), since patients declared dead by cardiocirculatory criteria cannot be known to be brain dead, dismissing signs compatible with distress as not being distress again does not prevent the possibility of distress. Re: (3) physicians may inappropriately withhold sufficient sedative or analgesic medication to avoid the appearance of euthanasia or in order to improve organ viability.

There is also the question of whether DCD patients receive compromised end of life (EOL) care. The President's Council for Bioethics has warned that DCD can transform EOL care from a "peaceful dignified death" into a profanely "high-tech death" experience for donors and donor's families. ICUs are not typically set up to provide optimum palliative care. The process of obtaining donation consent and subsequent donor management protocols for DCD deviate from some of the quality indicators recommended for optimal EOL care. Organ-focused behaviour by professionals requesting consent for organ donation and ambivalent decision making by family members increase the risk of relatives of deceased donors subsequently developing traumatic memories and stress disorders. The processes required for the successful accomplishment of donation consent and subsequent organ recovery can interfere with many of the interventions that lessen the burden of bereavement of relatives of ICU decedents.

== Informed consent ==
The standard consent for DCD goes like this. Patients or families are told that they will have a chance to say their goodbyes, the patient will then be taken to the operating room, life support will be removed, and after 2–10 minutes of continuously observed absence of pulse, blood pressure, and respiration, death will be declared and the removal of organs begin. Consent to this is taken to be consent to organ donation at death determined by cardiocirculatory criteria, i.e., to DCD. The problem is that death is commonly understood as an irreversible state in the strong sense. The commonsense understanding of death is that it is a permanent state, and that if a person has truly died then life cannot be restored to the individual. Death understood as an irreversible state in the weak sense—as one that will not be, or ought not to be, or cannot legally or morally be reversed—is on this view a revisionist account of how death can be best conceived rather than an accurate descriptive account of how it actually is commonly understood. Given this, when donors consent to donation at death they can only be presumed to be consenting to organ donation when their loved one is in a physically irreversible state. Since, however, death determined by cardiocirculatory criteria is not necessarily a physically irreversible state, consent to organ donation at death is not consent to organ donation at death determined by cardiocirculatory criteria.

Menikoff criticizes the IOM for not routinely disclosing to prospective donors and families that and how death determined by cardiocirculatory criteria differs from death in the ordinary sense. In particular, he faults the IOM for not telling them that donors will be declared dead before brain death is known to have occurred, and hence they may have their organs removed when portions of the brain (including the higher brain) are still functional. Potts et al. on behalf of the IOM reply that informed consent does not require this level of disclosure: "Reviewing with interested family members that all brain activity may not have ceased at the exact moment that death is pronounced may be appropriate in some circumstances, but, for many families confronted with such overwhelming emotional matters, knowledge that death has been pronounced is what is paramount. The sensitivity and skill of the physicians and nurses to the individual needs of families is the key factor whether or not organ donation is involved."

Behind this disagreement on what disclosure is required is a larger one that Brock has characterized as a choice between "truth or consequences". In Brock's view, public policy cannot centre in on the unqualified and unconstrained search for the truth without concern for the consequences of that search. On some occasions "the likely effects on the well-being and rights of the public of exposing the full complexity, ambiguity, uncertainty, and controversy surrounding a particular public policy could be sufficiently adverse and serious to justify not exposing them and presenting the issue in misleading or oversimplified terms instead." Brock concludes that "No general answer can be given to truth-or-consequences choices that will hold for all cases. In any particular instance of this choice, we must instead weigh the policy gains against the moral and political risks, and how that balances out will often be empirically uncertain and morally controversial."

On the issue at hand, Menikoff and Brock think that the importance of informed consent should put us on the "truth" side of the question. Menikoff writes: "Deceiving prospective organ donors about relevant truths concerning their condition is likely, ultimately, to lead to diminished public confidence and to fewer organ donations. But even if it did not reduce the number of donated organs, in a system that is allegedly based on freely given consent, we must recognize that obtaining such consent by telling less than the truth is fundamentally wrong." And Brock contends that in a democratic state there is a presumption that the citizens will be informed about all relevant information of public policy, and thinks that DCD involves such a radical change in the timing of death from what people ordinarily think, that it is something that they should be informed about. By contrast, the IOM took itself to have the task of addressing the question: "Given a potential donor in an end-of-life situation, what are the alternative medical approaches that can be used to maximize the availability of organs from that donor without violating prevailing ethical norms regarding the rights and welfare of donors?" And it replied: "Our goal was to support both the interests of patients and families regarding nature and time of death and the public's interests in increased organ procurement. In striking the balance, the expert panel strictly adhered to widely endorsed principles of ethics and established legal and legal guidelines." In thus balancing what is disclosed to the family against what is in the interest of organ procurement, the IOM comes down on the "consequences" side of the "truth or consequences" debate.

== DCD and the future ==
DCD is a procedure that operates in an area set by two rules. The first is the DDR, which says that no vital organs can be taken before the patient is dead. The second, a corollary of this, prohibits killing patients by or for organ procurement.

It is not, however, always clear how procedures that are beneficial to transplantation can be fit under those rules. For example, providing ECMO (Extra Corporeal Membrane Oxygenation) to donors immediately after death is declared by cardiocirculatory criteria can keep organs in their freshest possible condition. If, however, ECMO provides circulation and oxygenation to the entire body, can the donor really be declared dead by those criteria? The rules can also generate other puzzle cases. If a donor is declared dead by cardiocirculatory criteria, can the heart be transplanted, or does the fact that the heart is started in another negate the determination of death in the first?

Further such problems are bound to arise in the future. To handle them Bernat recommends that a committee be set up: "A consensus-driven oversight process should determine whether investigational protocols reflect appropriate medical treatment and whether their translation into accepted clinical practice is sound public policy. Leaders of the critical care, neurology, and transplantation communities need to jointly draft practice guidelines for organ donation after circulatory death that establish acceptable boundaries of practice. These boundaries should be based on scientific data and accepted principles and should be demarcated conservatively to maintain public confidence in the integrity of the transplantation enterprise."

Others, however, argue that rather than having to either provide answers to these problems that square with the rules in question or forgo advantageous procedures, it would be best to reject those rules. Instead of making the question "When is the patient dead?" the central question to trigger organ retrieval, the proposal is to shift the focus to obtaining valid consent from patients or surrogates and the principle of nonmaleficence. As Truog explains the proposal: "On this view, policies could be changed such that organ procurement would be permitted only with the consent of the donor or appropriate surrogate and only when doing so would not harm the donor. Individuals who could not be harmed by the procedure would include those who are permanently and irreversibly unconscious (patients in a persistent vegetative state or newborns with anencephaly) and those who are imminently and irreversibly dying. Qualified individuals who had given their consent could simply have their organs removed under general anesthesia without first undergoing an orchestrated withdrawal of life support. Anencephalic newborns whose parents requested organ donation could likewise have the organs removed under general anesthesia without the need to wait for the diagnosis of brain death."

This approach has conceptual and pragmatic advantages. On the conceptual side, securing organs at optimum times does not require us to constantly redefine death and when it occurs so that persons who are alive may have their organs taken. It would also allow us to say that when a physician removes life-support and the patient dies that the physician caused patient's death. Many think this is more natural than saying that all the physician did was to return the patient to an untreated disease state and that state caused the death. Finally, we thereby avoid the proliferation of definitions of death with differing times in different jurisdictions, different definitions of death for different purposes (the cardiocirculatory definition of death discussed in this article is only valid for DCD), and arbitrary rulings such as declaring anencephalic infants with heartbeat dead.

On the pragmatic side, rejecting the rules in question would have advantages for recipients and donors in transplant programs. Because there will now be no necessary interval between pulselessness and the declaration of death, there can be a reduction in warm ischemia time, and so an improvement in the quality and quantity of transplantable organs. It will also be possible to give the donor drugs such as heparin and phentolamine, which can hasten death but also maximize organ preservation. Finally, it will eliminate the possibility that patients will experience discomfort as they are withdrawn from ventilator support by allowing potentially fatal doses of morphine that are not titrated to signs of distress.

The main obstacle to accepting the proposal is securing the acceptance of the public to allow physicians to cause the death of (which is to say kill) patients to obtain transplantable organs. Proponents of the proposal contend that robust consent requirements can provide the public with the assurance against exploitation that the dead donor rule and the prohibition on killing are designed to provide. Others deny this. Thus the question can be posed: "Given the difficulties our society is likely to experience in trying to openly adjudicate these disparate views [of accepting or rejecting the prohibition on physicians killing for transplantation], why not simply go along with the quieter strategy of policy creep? It seems to be getting us where we want to go, albeit slowly. Besides, total candor is not always compatible with public policy (Calabresi G and Bobbitt P. Tragic Choices. New York: Norton,1978)." The debate continues unresolved.

In 2026, attention was called to potential vulnerabilities and opportunities related to the limits of reliably assessing consciousness in critically ill, behaviorally unresponsive patients undergoing controlled organ donation, and neurologically informed safeguards in this setting were advanced.
