= Pulmonary venoocclusive disease =

Pulmonary veno-occlusive disease
- Other names: Obstructive disease of the pulmonary veins
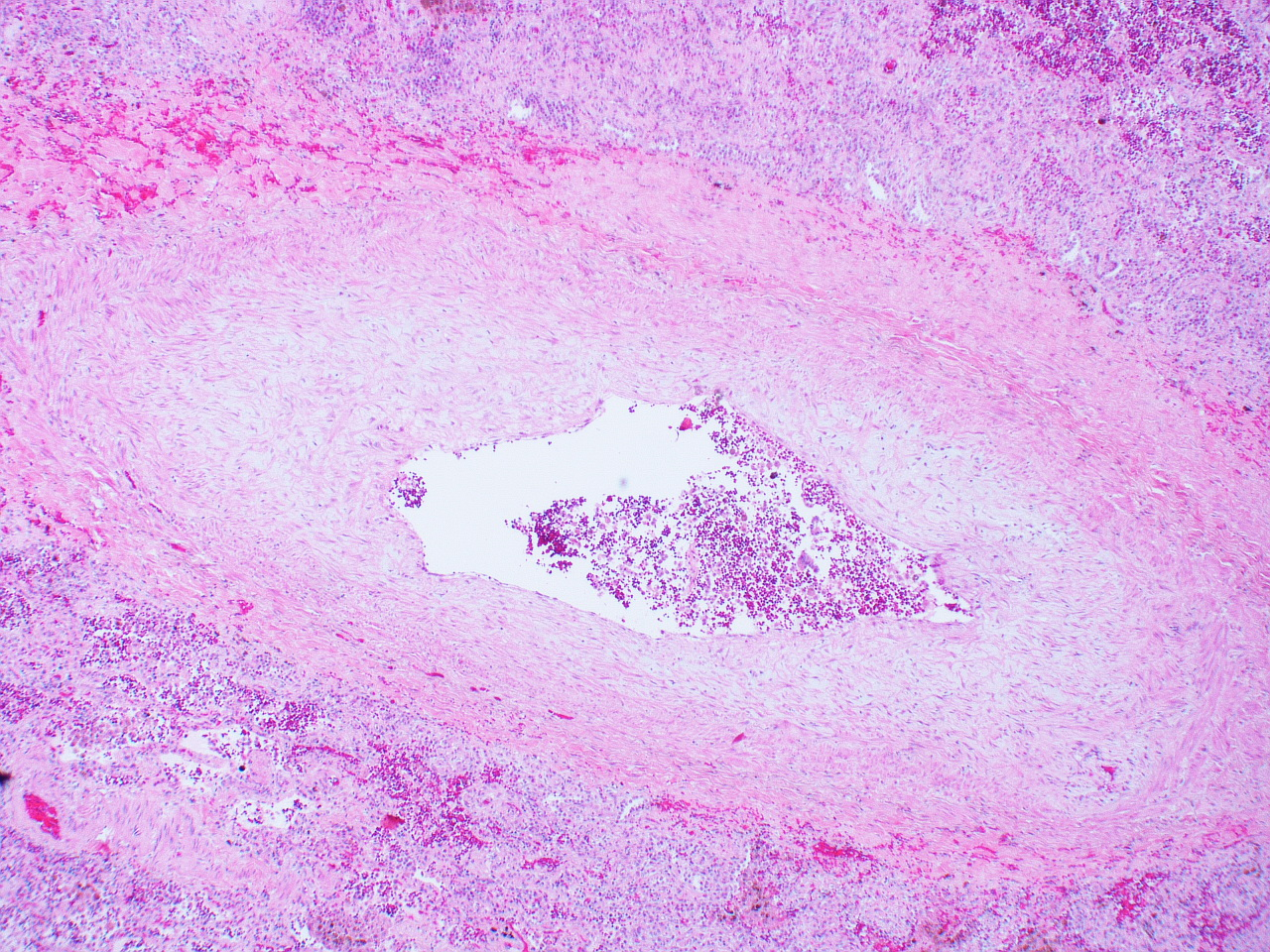
- Pulmonary veno-occlusive disease-Intimal fibrosis with marked narrowing of lumen of a large pulmonary vein
- Specialty: Pulmonology, cardiology
- Symptoms: Shortness of breath, fatigue
- Causes: Narrow pulmonary vein, Pulmonary artery hypertension
- Diagnostic method: Chest x-ray, Chest CT
- Treatment: Vasodilators can be used

Pulmonary veno-occlusive disease (PVOD) is a rare form of pulmonary hypertension caused by progressive blockage of the small veins in the lungs. The blockage leads to high blood pressures in the arteries of the lungs, which, in turn, leads to heart failure. The disease is progressive and fatal, with median survival of about 2 years from the time of diagnosis to death. The definitive therapy is lung transplantation.

== Signs and symptoms ==
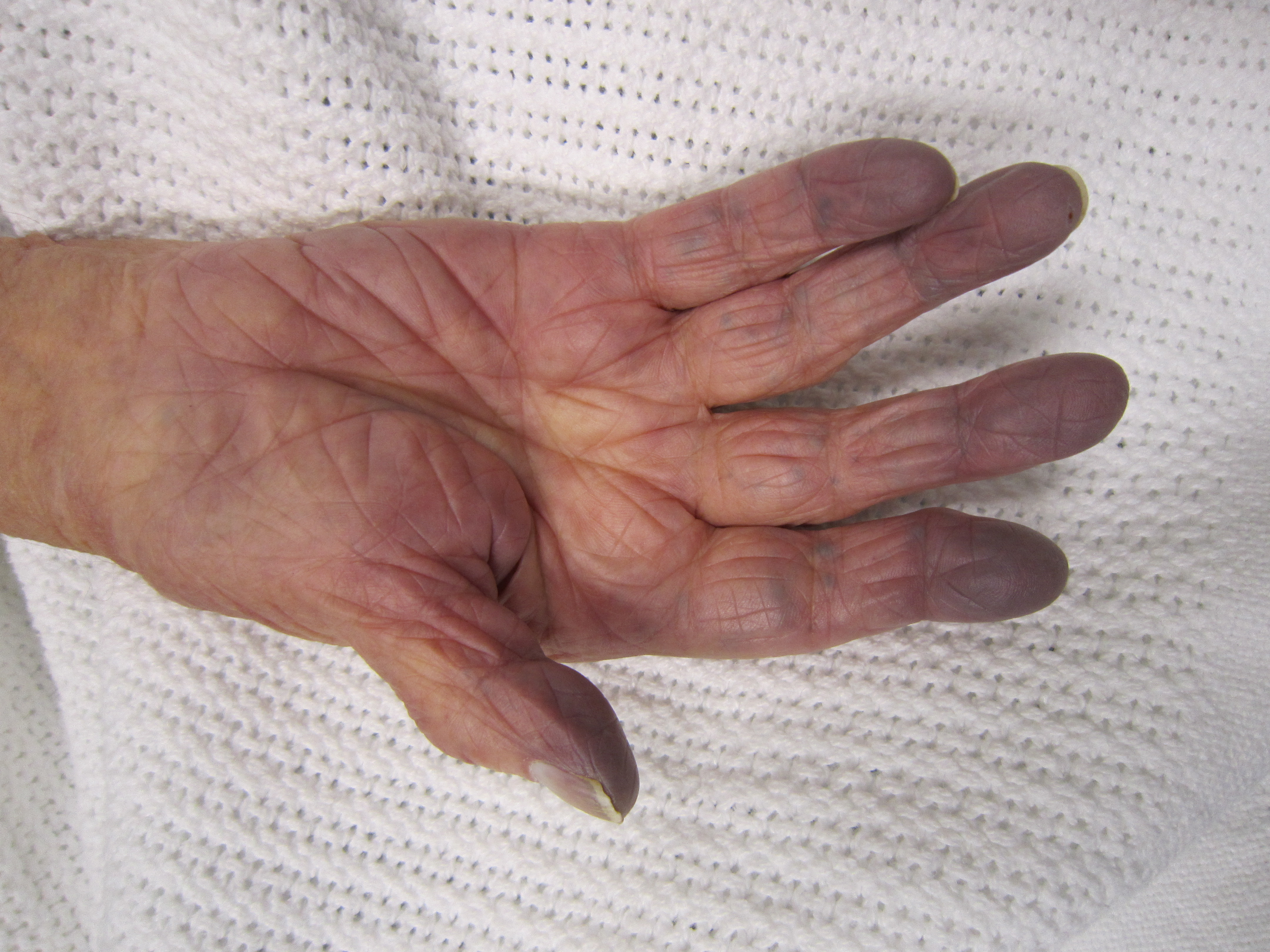
Cyanosis

The symptoms for pulmonary veno-occlusive disease are the following:

- Shortness of breath
- Fatigue
- Fainting
- Hemoptysis
- Difficulty breathing ( lying flat)
- Chest pain
- Cyanosis
- Hepatosplenic congestion

== Cause ==
The genetic cause of pulmonary veno-occlusive disease is mutations in EIF2AK4 gene. Though this does not mean other possible causes do not exist, such as viral infection and risk of toxic chemicals (chemotherapy drugs).

== Pathophysiology ==
Pulmonary veno-occlusive disease may have a genetic basis. Published reports have indicated fatal occurrences that appeared to possess a familial pattern, more to the point, a germline mutation. The pathophysiology of veno-occlusive disease culminates in occlusion of the pulmonary blood vessels. This could be due to edematous tissue (sclerotic fibrous tissue). Thickening is identified in lobular septal veins, also dilatation of lymphatics happens. Furthermore, alveolar capillaries become dilated (due to back-pressure).

== Diagnosis ==
Pulmonary veno-occlusive disease can only be well diagnosed with a lung biopsy. CT scans may show characteristic findings such as ground-glass opacities in centrilobular distribution, and mediastinal lymphadenopathy, but these findings are non-specific and may be seen in other conditions. However, pulmonary hypertension (revealed via physical examination), in the presence of pleural effusion (done via CT scan) usually indicates a diagnosis of pulmonary veno-occlusive disease. The prognosis indicates usually a 2-year (24 month) life expectancy after diagnosis.

== Treatment ==
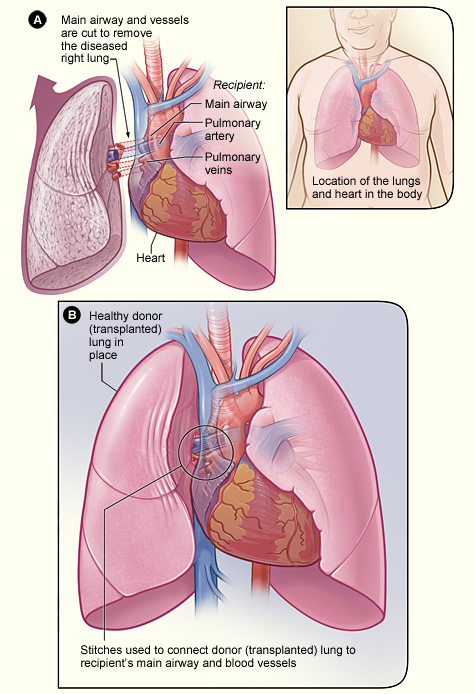
The technique of Lung transplant, the definitive therapy of PVOD.

Treatments for primary pulmonary hypertension such as prostacyclins and endothelin receptor antagonists can be fatal in people with PVOD due to the development of severe pulmonary edema, and worsening symptoms after initiation of these medications may be a clue to the diagnosis of pulmonary veno-occlusive disease.

The definitive therapy is lung transplantation, though transplant rejection is always a possibility, in this measures must be taken in terms of appropriate treatment and medication.

== Epidemiology ==
Pulmonary venoocclusive disease is rare, difficult to diagnose, and probably frequently misdiagnosed as idiopathic pulmonary arterial hypertension. Prevalence in parts of Europe is estimated to be 0.1-0.2 cases per million.

PVOD appears to occur as frequently in men as in women, and age at diagnosis ranges from 7–74 years with a median of 39 years. PVOD may occur in patients with associated diseases such as HIV, bone marrow transplantation, and connective tissue diseases. PVOD has also been associated with several chemotherapy regimens such as bleomycin, BCNU, and mitomycin.

== Society and culture ==
- Chloe Temtchine, American singer-songwriter with PVOD
