= Reine Arcache Melvin =

Filipina writer

- Born: Manila, Philippines
- Education: Bard College, New York
- Occupation: Author
- Known for: A Normal Life and Other Stories, The Betrayed

Reine Arcache Melvin is a Filipina-American author whose works focus on the Philippines and the lives of Filipino both at home and abroad. Arcache Melvin's works include the short-story collection A Normal Life and Other Stories and novel The Betrayed.

== Early life ==
Melvin was born to a Filipino-American family in Manila. She spent her childhood in Santa Ana and attended the Assumption College San Lorenzo and Ateneo de Manila University in Quezon City, before moving to the United States and graduating from Bard College in New York.

== Career ==
In 1999, Melvin published A Normal Life and Other Stories with Ateneo de Manila University Press. That same year, her collection won a Philippine National Book Award for fiction and was translated into French in 2003. Her short stories have appeared in numerous literary reviews and anthologies in the United States, France and the Philippines. The short story ‘Stealing a Child’ won first prize for short fiction in the 2001 Philippine Graphic Nick Joaquin Awards. Her second book, the novel The Betrayed, won the Palanca Award for Best Novel and the National Book Award in 2019.

She worked many years for the International Herald Tribune in Paris. She has also worked as a translator and editor for various international publications and co-edited literary reviews in both New York and Paris.

== Works ==
- A Normal Life and Other Stories, short story collection, released in March 1999.
- The Betrayed, novel, released in October 2018.
