= Chloe Temtchine =

American singer-songwriter

- Born: Upper East Side, New York, USA
- Genres: Pop, soul
- Occupation: Singer-songwriter-speaker
- Website: chloetemtchine.com

Chloe Temtchine is an American singer-songwriter.

== Early life ==
Temtchine is from Upper East Side, New York. She studied at Berklee College of Music, in Boston, Massachusetts. At the time, on Sundays, her father would bring her to a Baptist church in Harlem, where she was exposed to gospel music.

== Career ==
Her debut album, Between Day & Dream, was released in 2009. Temtchine won the 2011 Avon National and International Songwriting Competition with her song "Step Up," which was used in an Avon television commercial. She performed on Late Night with David Letterman as a backup vocalist for musical guest Ne-Yo, sang in a 2012 commercial for the 100th anniversary of American Express, and was featured on NY-1 News, with "Where in The Truck is Chloe."

Her 2015 album, Be Brave, was produced by Toby Gad. Temtchine wrote the title track in 2014 after she was released from intensive care. Amy Carlberg of Bust magazine wrote that the track was "twangy and energetic, and springboards off the bluegrass and banjo-laden sounds that have been ruling the pop charts". Over 150,000 copies of the album were downloaded within the first 90 days of its release.

== Health issues ==
Beginning in 2008, Temtchine suffered a series of medical issues, including shortness of breath and onstage coughing fits. In February 2013, she was hospitalized with congestive heart failure and difficulty breathing. She was diagnosed with a rare disorder, pulmonary venoocclusive disease (PVOD), in addition to severe pulmonary hypertension.

In August 2020, Temtchine suffered a cardiac arrest, was in a coma, and spent 21 days on life support before receiving a double lung transplant. She required the continuous use of an oxygen tank that was connected to a nasal breathing tube, and in February 2021, Chloe (who sings with a paralyzed vocal cord) performed live for the first time since the transplant.
