= Reine Mazoyer =

French artist (born 1944)

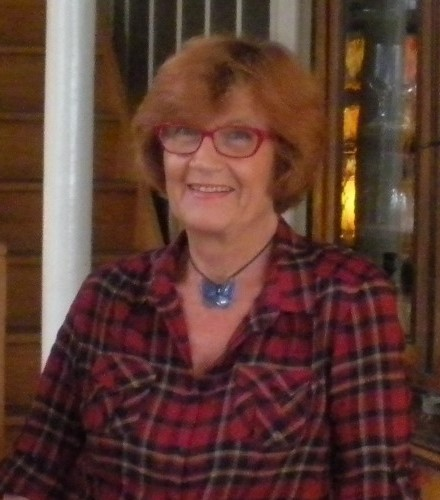
- Born: 6 January 1944 (age 82); Montbrison, Auvergne-Rhone-Alpes, France
- Occupations: Painter, Sculptor, Book illustrator, Filmmaker
- Spouse: Robert Mazoyer (m. 1965; died 1999)
- Children: 1 son
- Website: www.reine-mazoyer.com

Reine Mazoyer (born 6 January 1944) is a French plastic artist who describes herself as a "non-realistic figurative artist". The wife of the late film director Robert Mazoyer, she collaborated with the set design for some of his films and television series and also acted in some. More recently, while continuing her career as an artist, she has directed short films and has illustrated books of nonsense verse.

== Early life and education ==
Mazoyer was born in Montbrison in the Loire département in central France on 6 January 1944. Her father was an upholsterer, decorator, and antique dealer, while her mother was a seamstress and upholsterer. Both her father and grandfather were amateur painters and she has said that she owes her vocation to her father. She spent her early childhood both in Montbrison with her parents and in Montrond-les-Bains, also in the Loire, in her grandparents' houses. Primary school in Montbrison was followed by secondary education in Saint-Étienne. She then entered the École des Beaux-arts de St Étienne, where she obtained a diploma in decoration, before moving to Paris.

== Career ==
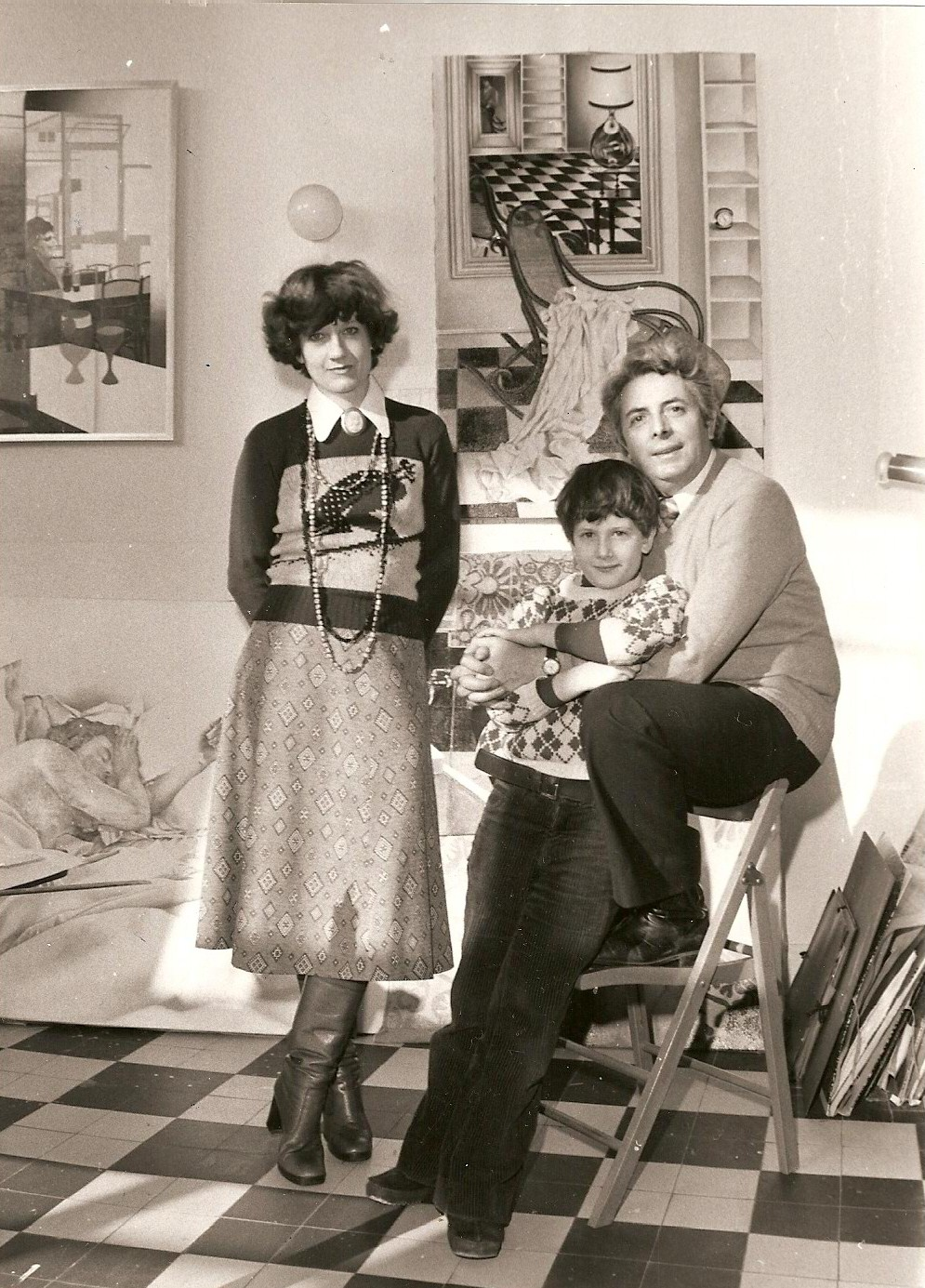
Reine Mazoyer with her husband and son in her atelier

=== Painting and sculpture ===
She met the film director Robert Mazoyer (1929–1999) in Paris, and they married in 1965. They had one son, Julien (1966–1992). She first exhibited in Paris in 1973, having previously shown in Brittany. She also worked with her husband as a set designer (e.g. in Maria des Eaux-Vives), and appeared in some of his films and series, notably the 13-part television series Les Gens de Mogador . In 1997, her husband produced a 23-minute documentary called Le Portrait du peintre (The Portrait of the Painter) in which he followed his wife in the act of creating a painting. Original music for the soundtrack was by Jacques Loussier.

In 1973, Mazoyer won the Pierre David-Weill Prize for Drawing, awarded by the Académie des Beaux-Arts of Paris. Since then, she has held over 30 solo exhibitions and has been represented in more than 20 collective exhibitions. She has exhibited in Belgium, Germany, Italy, the UK and the US, in addition to France. Among her more unusual assignments was to decorate the inside of a brasserie in Warsaw. In 2009 Mazoyer was made a Chevalier of the Ordre des Arts et des Lettres. Four of her paintings, called Les Apocalypses, were exhibited at the 2009 Copenhagen climate summit (COP 15). In 2022 a retrospective of the previous twelve years of her work, entitled Imagined Encounters, was held at the Musée d'Allard in Montbrison. In 2024 she contributed a group of colourful ceramic masks to decorate a 700-year-old olive tree in the gardens of the Château de la Bastie d'Urfé in Forez in the Loire. It was called the Tree of Love and Reconciliation.

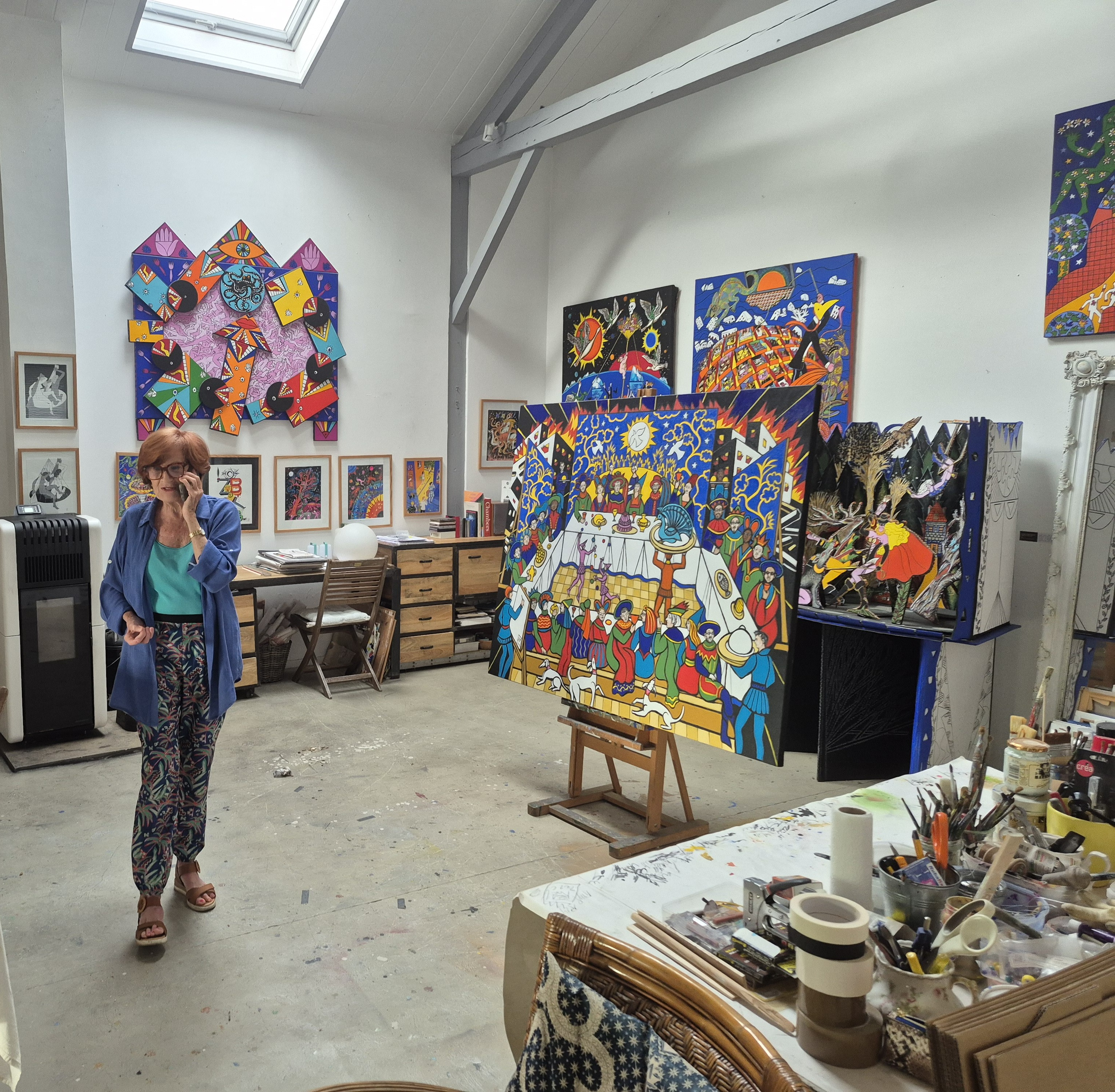
Mazoyer in her atelier in the Dordogne, France

=== Book illustrations ===
Mazoyer's artistic work has involved drawing, painting, installations, and book illustration. She usually uses very vivid colours in her paintings, which have been described as being in a "falsely naïve" style. This is clearly found in an ongoing collaboration with Dick Dixon, which between 2015 and 2024 had produced and published seven books of humorous poetry by Dixon, illustrated by Mazoyer, called in sequence Rhymes for no Reason; Rhymes of the Newfangled Mariner; The Curse of the Square Crow; In Bed with the Cats' Pyjamas; Tricked by the Kippers' Knickers; The Elephant in the Other Room; and Too many Cooks have a Silver Lining. Mazoyer has also published L'Etang aux trente-six sourires (The Pond of 36 Smiles - 2009), a series of pastel drawings on black ink accompanied by haikus, inspired by her life as a young girl; Souvenirs d'Enfance, a book to accompany her exhibition at the Espace Trait Personnel in Paris in 2007; and Portraits d'Écrivains (Portraits of Writers - 1993), a series of drawings and water colours of writers, both friends and her favourite writers, including John Lennon and Albert Camus, accompanied by short texts.

=== Filmmaking ===
Mazoyer also became a director of several short films. In 2013, she released À la recherche de Santo Modico, made in Brazil and inspired by her late husband's 1961 film, Santo Modico. Earlier, she had collaborated with her British partner to produce a series of shorts about Friendship. To do this they tracked down many of the boys with whom her partner had been to secondary school in England. Filming took them to Australia, Gambia and Rome, as well as England.

== Gallery of paintings ==
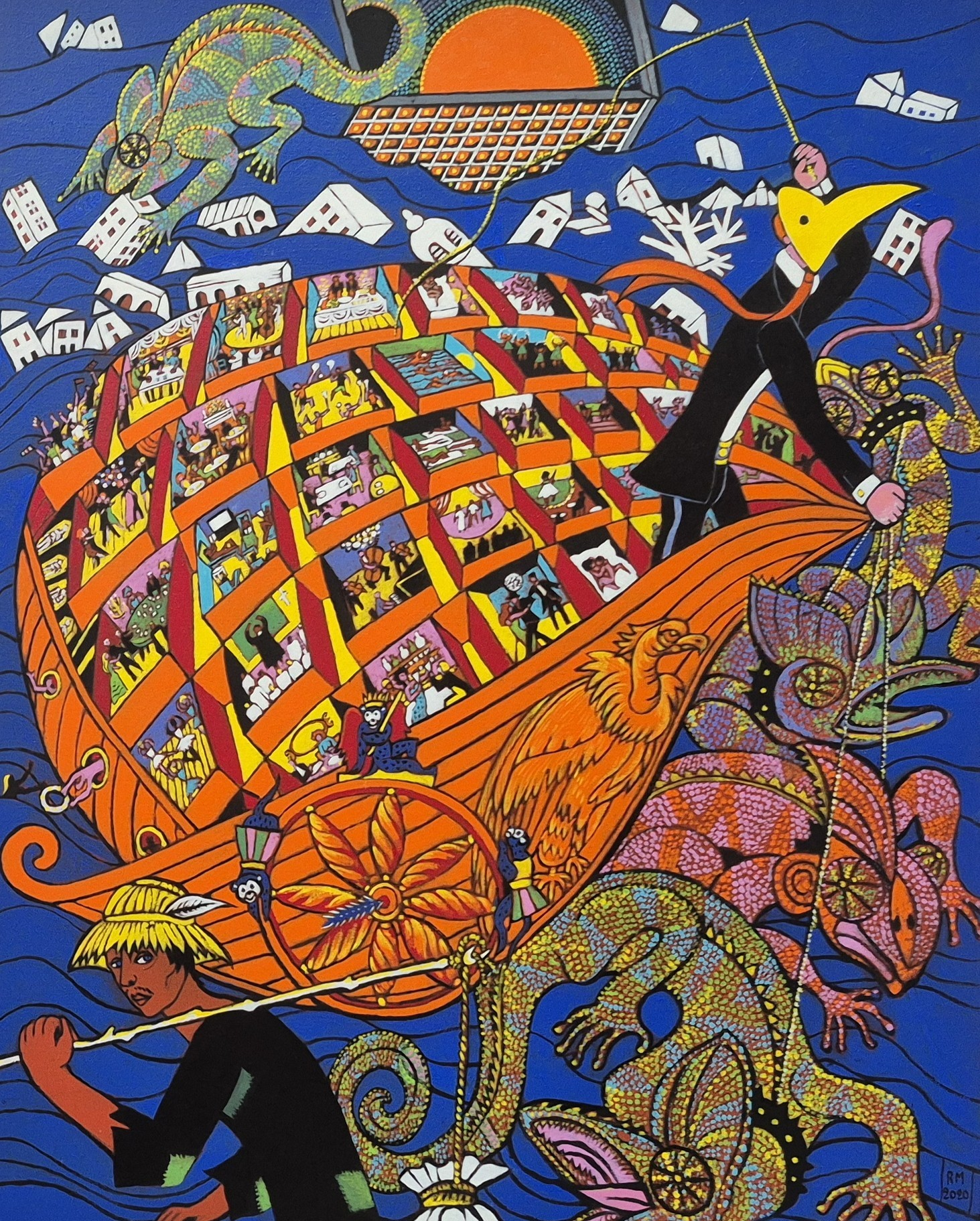
La Croisière, 2022

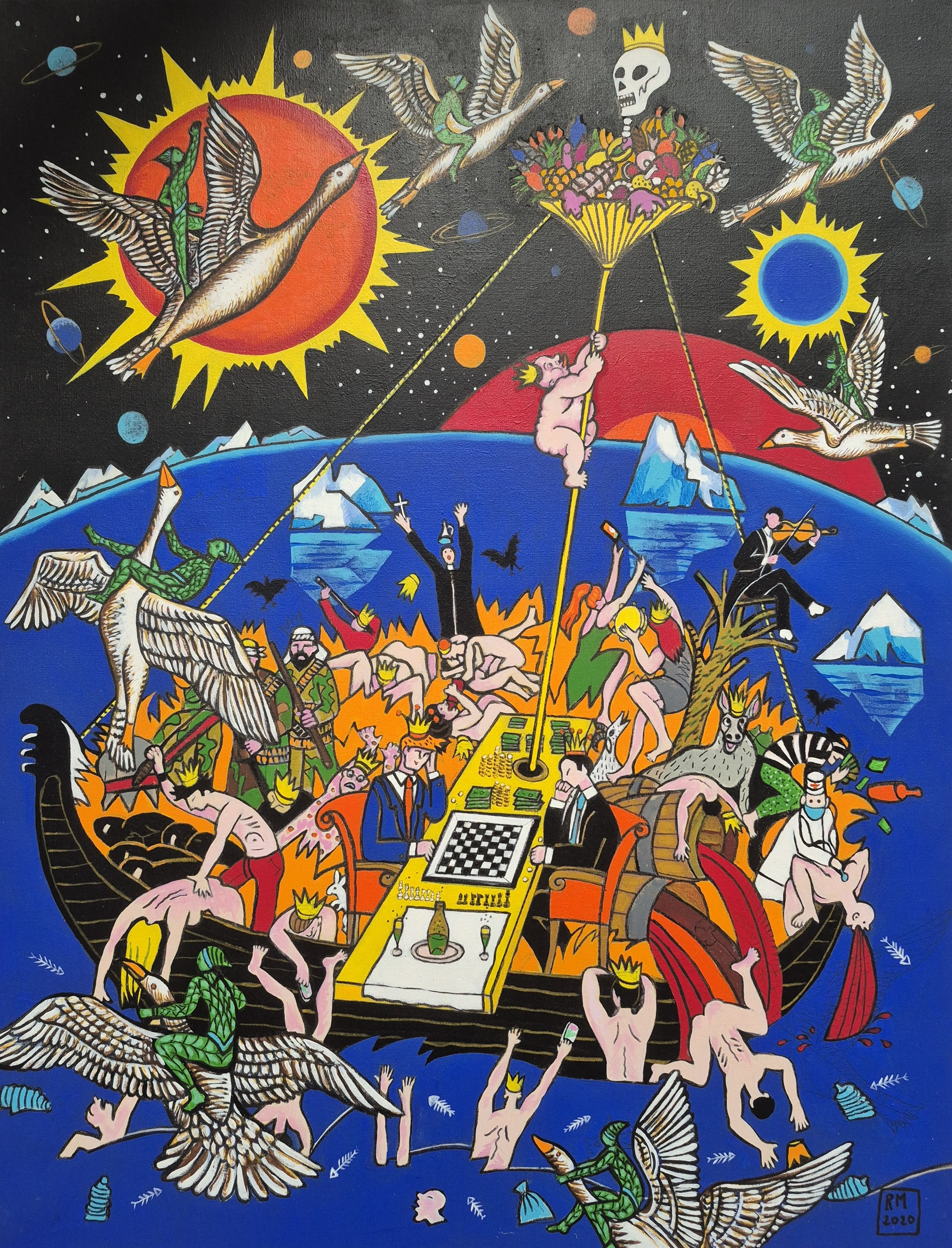
La Nef des Fous, 2022

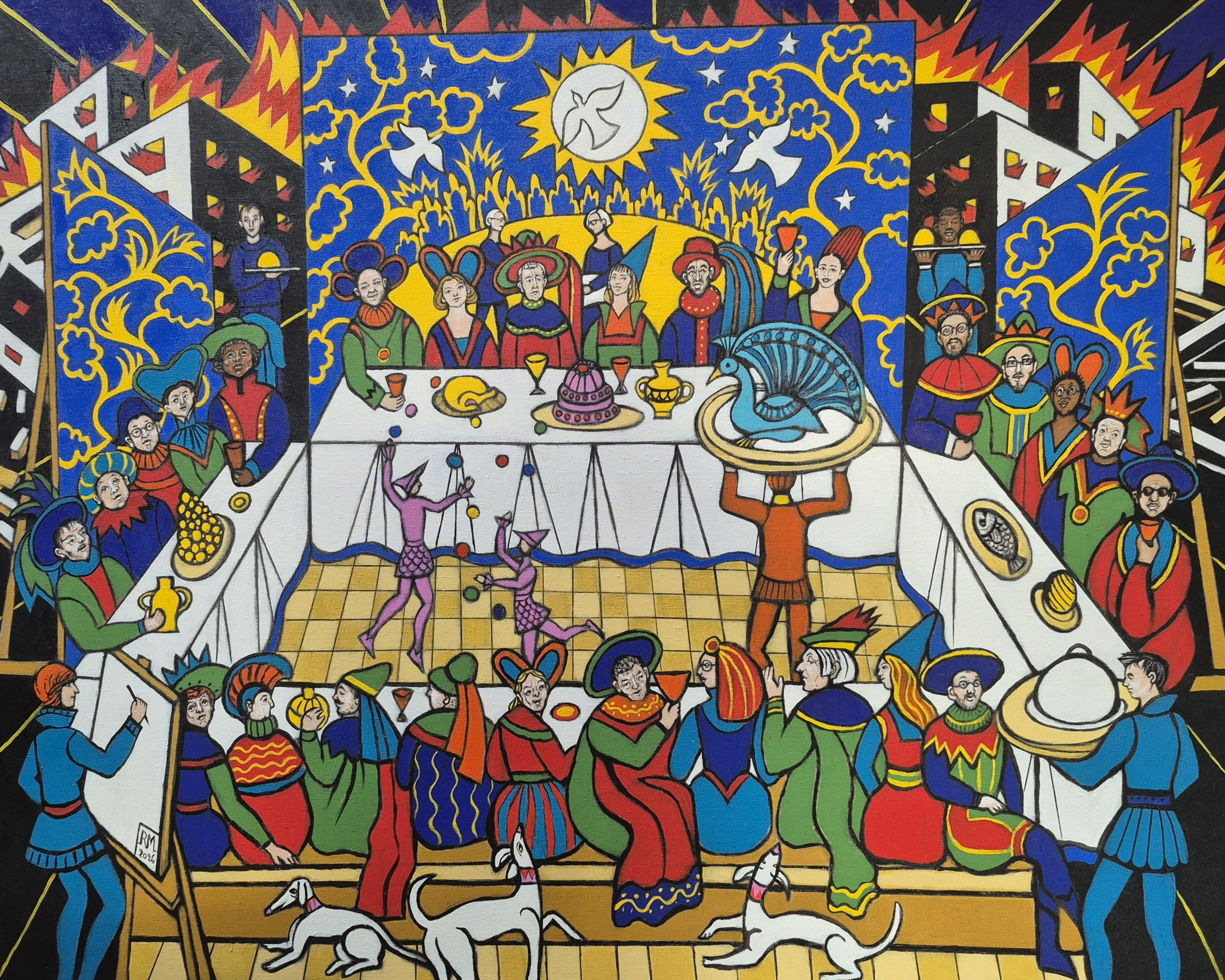
Le repas des Rois, 2026

== Solo exhibitions ==
Mazoyer's solo exhibitions are listed below. She has also contributed to around 20 collective exhibitions.

- 2024. Paris Arty-Show, Paris
- 2022. Rencontres imaginées, Musée d'Allard, Montbrison
- 2017. Rencontres imaginées, Bordeaux
- 2015. Portraits d'artistes, Paris
- 2013. Apocalypses (Installation), Lyon
- 2011. Esprit d’enfance, parcours d'installations, Montbrison
- 2009. Spirit of Childhood, London, England
- 2009. Pastels, Montbrison
- 2007. Souvenirs d'enfance, Lyon
- 2002. Le temps des cafés, Paris
- 2000. MAC2000 Art Contemporain, Paris
- 1999. Espace Chatelet Victoria, Paris
- 1998. Le Manteau de Lucrèce, St Etienne
- 1997. Le labyrinthe au-delà des forêts (Installation) Paris
- 1996. Le tremplin, Lyon
- 1995. Passions d’eau, Paris
- 1994. MAC 2000 Art contemporain, Paris; Le Mans; Offenburg
- 1993. Portraits d'écrivains, St. Etienne
- 1992. Galerie Lilianne François; Galerie Magda Danisz, Paris; Galerie Alias, Paris
- 1991. Triennale du Pastel, Allonnes, Sarthe
- 1990. Mac2000 Art Contemporain, Paris
- 1989. Hérétiques, Mac 2000 Art Contemporain, Paris
- 1988. Hôtel de ville, Garches
- 1984. Chez un collectionneur, Paris
- 1983. Galerie Matisse, Vichy
- 1979. Galerie Aéroport d'Orly, Paris
- 1977. Maison de la Culture, St Etienne
- 1975. Galerie Annick Gendron, Paris
- 1969. Empreintes et reliefs, Kerdruc, Brittany
