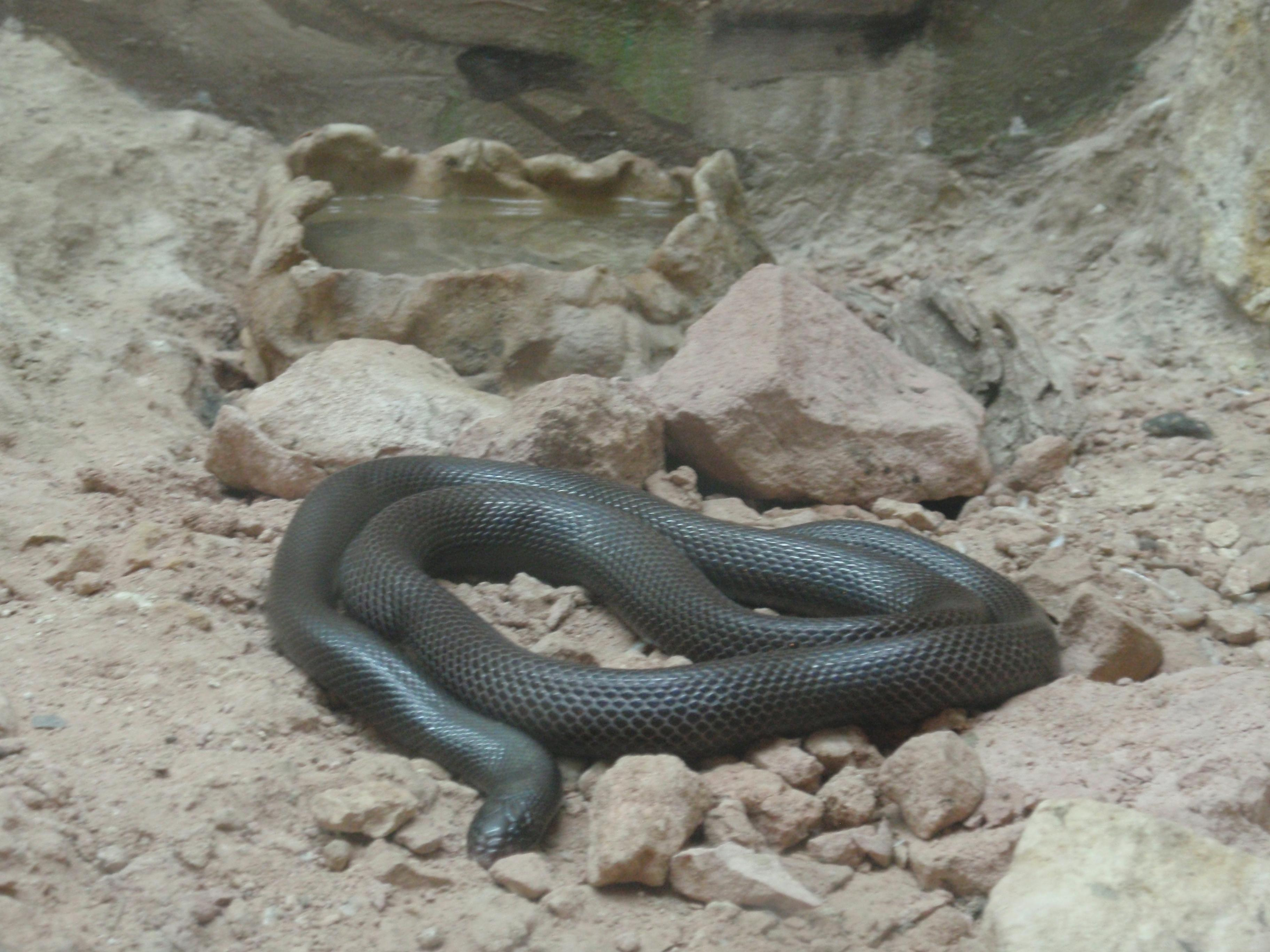
- Atractaspis engaddensis

Scientific classification
- Kingdom: Animalia
- Phylum: Chordata
- Class: Reptilia
- Order: Squamata
- Suborder: Serpentes
- Family: Atractaspididae
- Subfamily: Atractaspidinae
- Genus: Atractaspis; A. Smith, 1849

= Atractaspis =

Genus of snakes

Atractaspis is a genus of venomous snakes in the family Atractaspidae, also known as the stiletto snakes. The genus is endemic to Africa and the Middle East. The genus contains 15 species that are recognized by ITIS. Others recognize as many as 21 species. 23 are listed here.

== Common names ==
Common names for snakes of the genus Atractaspis include burrowing vipers, burrowing asps, mole vipers, stiletto snakes, side-stabbing snakes, side-stabbers. "Side stabbing" refers to the snakes' uncommon ability to strike with the side of its head and inject venom with one protruding fang.

== Geographic range ==
Species of the genus Atractaspis are found mostly in Sub-Saharan Africa, with a limited distribution in the Jordan valley in Israel, Palestine and the Arabian Peninsula.

== Description ==
Members of the genus Atractaspis share the following characteristics: Venom fangs enormously developed; a few teeth on the palatines, none on the pterygoids; mandibles edentulous anteriorly, with 2 or 3 very small teeth in the middle of the dentary bone. Postfrontal bone absent. Head small, not distinct from neck, covered with large symmetrical shields; nostril between 2 nasals; no loreal; eye minute, with round pupil. Body cylindrical; dorsal scales smooth, without apical pits, in 17 to 37 rows; ventrals rounded. Tail short; subcaudals either single or in two rows.

== Species ==
Species	Taxon author*	Subspecies**	Common name	Geographic range
A. andersonii	Boulenger, 1905			Oman, Yemen
A. aterrima	Günther, 1863	————	slender burrowing asp	Africa: from Senegal and the Gambia east to DR Congo and Uganda.
A. battersbyi	de Witte, 1959	————	Battersby's burrowing asp	Africa: Bolobo, on the Congo River basin, DR Congo.
A. bibronii	A. Smith, 1849	bibronii rostrata	Bibron's burrowing asp	Southern Africa, from central Namibia, east to northern South Africa, north to south-eastern DR Congo, eastern Tanzania, coastal Kenya, and extreme southern coastal Somalia.
A. boulengeri	Mocquard, 1897	matschiensis mixta schmidti schultzei vanderborghti	Central African burrowing asp	Africa: the forests of the western Congo River basin.
A. branchi	Rödel et al., 2019		Branch's stiletto snake	Africa: from Liberia to Guinea
A. congica	W. Peters, 1877	leleupi orientalis	Congo burrowing asp	Africa: from the mouth of the Congo River south to Angola, south-eastern DR Congo and northern Zambia.
A. corpulenta	(Hallowell, 1854)	kivuensis leucura	fat burrowing asp	Africa: from Liberia to Ghana and from Nigeria eastwards to north-eastern DR Congo.
A. dahomeyensis	Bocage, 1887	————	Dahomey burrowing asp	Africa: from southwestern Cameroon, north and west through Nigeria, Benin, Togo, Ghana, north-western Ivory Coast, south-western Burkina Faso and south-central Mali.
A. duerdeni	Gough, 1907	————	Duerden's burrowing asp	Africa in two isolated populations: one in north-central Namibia and one in south-eastern Botswana and northern South Africa.
A. engaddensis	Haas, 1950		En-Gedi asp, alasawad alkhabith	Asia: Israel, Palestine, Saudi Arabia, Lebanon
A. engdahli	Lönnberg & Andersson, 1913	————	Engdahl's burrowing asp	Africa: southern Somalia and the lower Juba Valley northwest into northeastern Kenya.
A. fallax	W. Peters, 1867	————		Ethiopia, Kenya, Somalia
A. irregularis	(J.T. Reinhardt, 1843)	angeli bipostocularis conradsi parkeri uelensis	variable burrowing asp	Africa: from Liberia to Ghana, from Nigeria east to Uganda, southern Sudan, and western and central Kenya, and south to north-eastern Tanzania, DR Congo and north-western Angola.
A. leucomelas	Boulenger, 1895	————	Ogaden burrowing asp	Africa: eastern Ethiopia, northwestern Somalia and Djibouti.
A. magrettii	Scortecci, 1928			western Eritrea, northwestern Ethiopia, south-eastern Sudan
A. microlepidota	Günther, 1866		small-scaled burrowing asp	Africa: Senegal, Gambia, southern Mauritania, and western Mali
A. micropholis	Günther, 1872			Burkina Faso, Mali, Niger, Nigeria
A. phillipsi	Barbour, 1913			south-eastern Sudan
A. reticulata	Sjöstedt, 1896	brieni heterochilus	reticulate burrowing asp	Central Africa: from southern Cameroon, east to eastern DR Congo and south to Angola.
A. scorteccii	Parker, 1949	————	Somali burrowing asp	Africa: eastern Ethiopia and northern Somalia.
A. watsoni	Boulenger, 1908		Watson's burrowing asp	Burkina Faso, Cameroon, Chad, Central African Republic, Mali, Mauritania, Niger, Nigeria, Senegal

*) A taxon author in parentheses indicates that the species was originally described in a genus other than Atractaspis.
**) Not including the nominate subspecies.

== See also ==
- Snakebite
