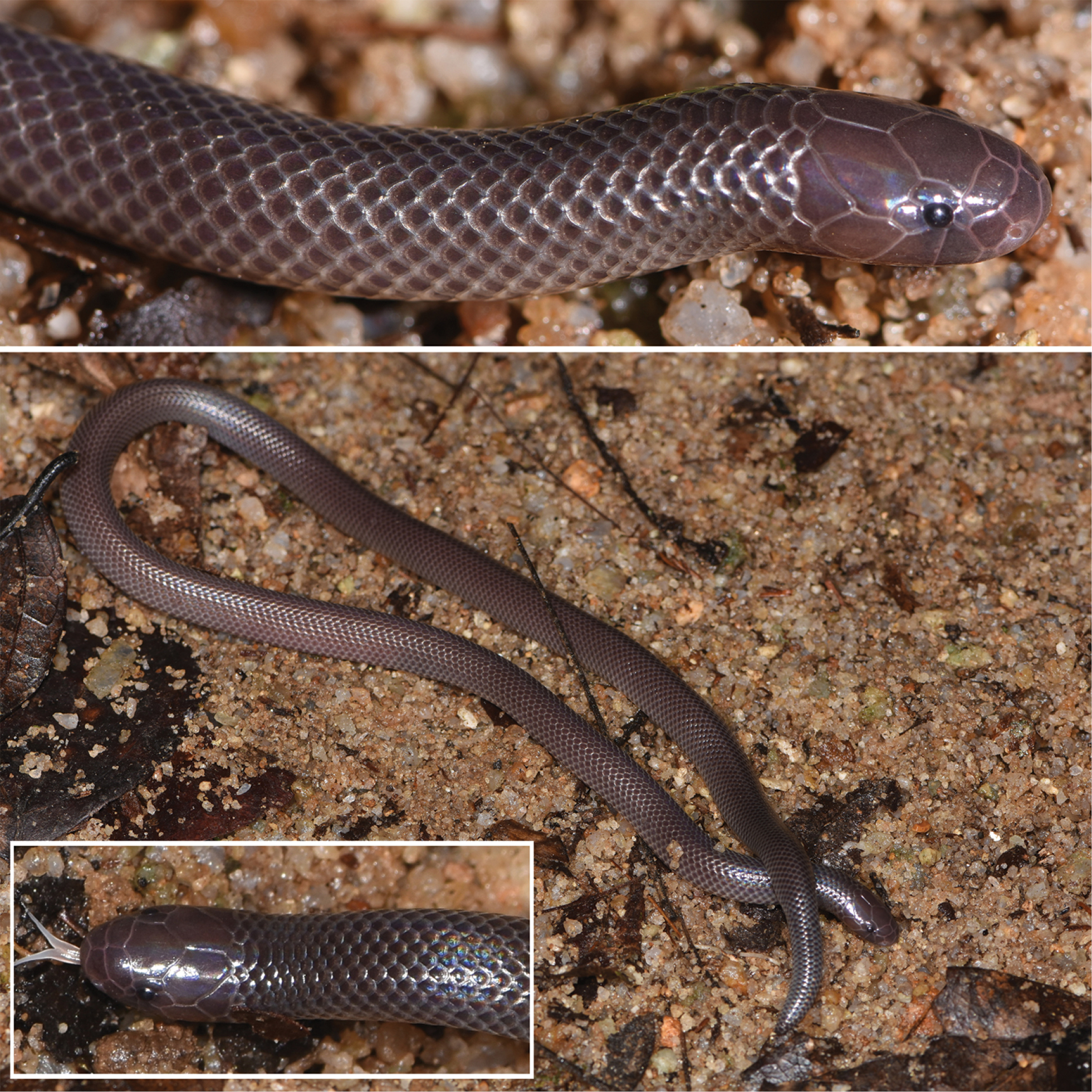

Scientific classification
- Kingdom: Animalia
- Phylum: Chordata
- Class: Reptilia
- Order: Squamata
- Suborder: Serpentes
- Family: Atractaspididae
- Genus: Atractaspis
- Species: A. branchi

Binomial name
- Atractaspis branchi Rödel et al., 2019

= Atractaspis branchi =

Species of snake

Atractaspis branchi, known commonly as Branch's stiletto snake, is a species of fossorial, venomous snake in the family Atractaspididae. The species is endemic to West Africa.

== Etymology ==
The specific name branchi is to honor South African herpetologist William Roy (Bill) Branch, a world-leading expert on African reptiles.

== Description ==
The species A. branchi, like other species of its genus, is notable for its unusual skull, allowing it to stab sideways with a fang sticking out of the corner of its mouth. A. branchi has morphological similarities to A. reticulata, but is distinguished by having 19 rows of dorsal scales at midbody.

== Habitat and geographic range ==
Atractaspis branchi lives in primary rainforest and rainforest edges in the western part of the Upper Guinea forests in Guinea and Liberia.
