= Atractaspis dahomeyensis =

Scientific classification
- Kingdom: Animalia
- Phylum: Chordata
- Class: Reptilia
- Order: Squamata
- Suborder: Serpentes
- Family: Atractaspididae
- Genus: Atractaspis
- Species: A. dahomeyensis

Binomial name
- Atractaspis dahomeyensis Bocage, 1887

Species of snake

Atractaspis dahomeyensis, or the Dahomey burrowing asp, is a species of venomous snake in the Atractaspididae family.

== Geographic range ==
It is endemic to Africa.

== Description ==
Atractaspis dahomeyensis is black dorsally. It is brown ventrally, and the ventral scales are edged with lighter brown.

Snout prominent and cuneiform. Dorsal scales arranged in 31 rows. Ventrals 240; anal entire; subcaudals 24, partly entire, partly divided.

Total length 49 cm (19 1/4 in); tail 32 mm (1 1/4 in).
