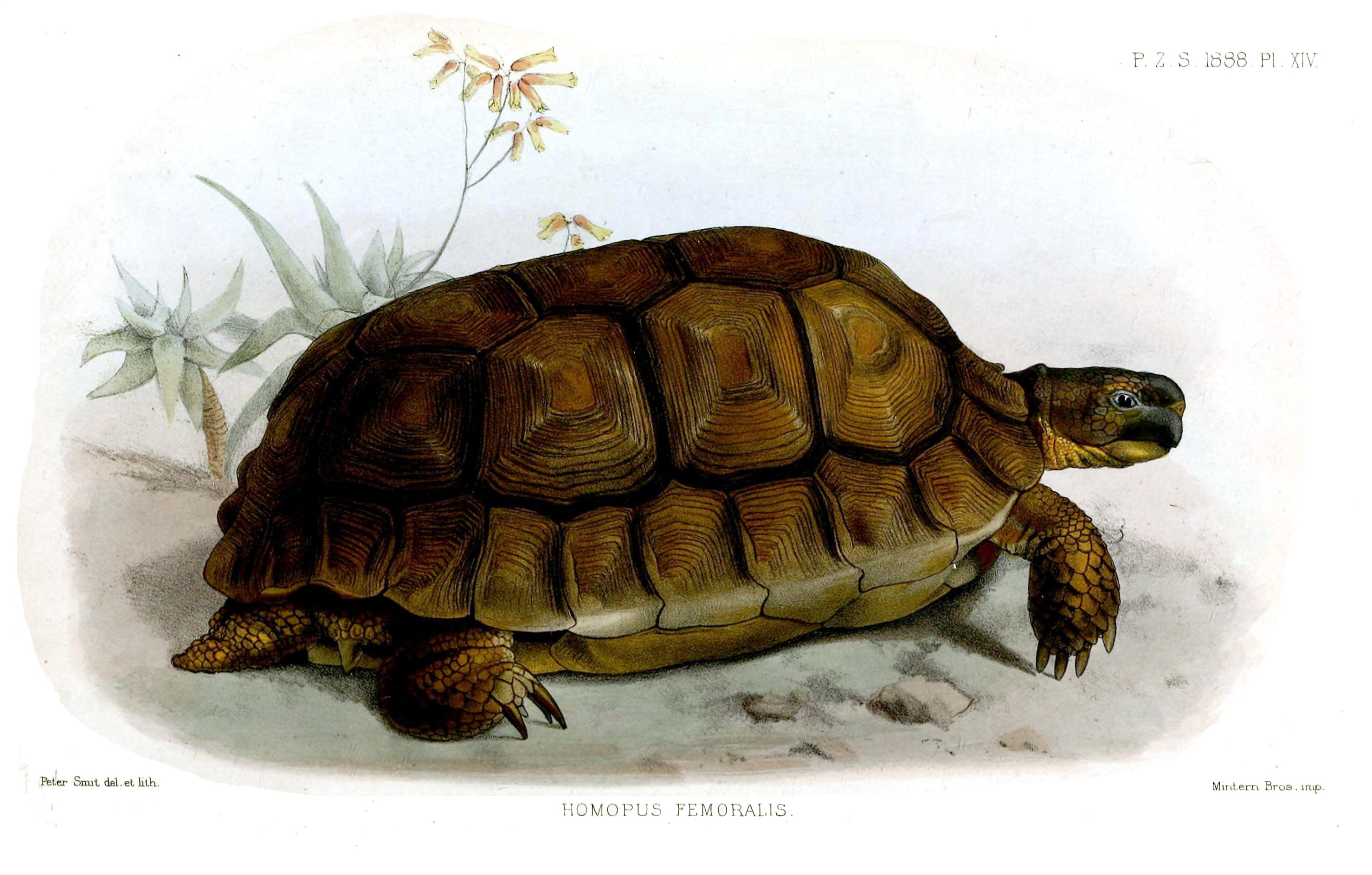
- Greater padloper (Homopus femoralis)

Scientific classification
- Domain: Eukaryota
- Kingdom: Animalia
- Phylum: Chordata
- Class: Reptilia
- Order: Testudines
- Suborder: Cryptodira
- Superfamily: Testudinoidea
- Family: Testudinidae
- Genus: Homopus; A.M.C. Duméril & Bibron, 1834

Species
- 2

= Homopus =

Genus of small tortoises from southern Africa

Homopus is a genus of tiny tortoises in the family Testudinidae, endemic to southern Africa. Three species formerly included in Homopus were reclassified into the genus Chersobius, leaving two remaining as Homopus: the common padloper (H. areolatus) and the greater padloper (H. femoralis).

== Naming ==
As a group, the closely related species in Homopus and Chersobius are commonly known in Europe and Africa as padlopers (originally meaning "path-walkers" in Afrikaans), due to their habit of making tiny pathways through vegetation. In other parts of the world, such as the United States, they are known as Cape tortoises.

== Distribution ==
The genus is indigenous and endemic to South Africa.

== Species ==
The genus contains these species:

Image	Common names	Scientific name	Distribution
	Common padloper or parrot-beaked tortoise	Homopus areolatus	Southern Cape coastal region, the most common padloper species
	Greater padloper or Karoo cape tortoise (so-called, although not widespread in the Karoo region)	Homopus femoralis	The Highveld grasslands, the largest of the padlopers

== Conservation and captivity ==
They are threatened by habitat destruction, traffic on roads, overgrazing, and poaching for the pet trade. Another threat comes from introduced species, such as domestic dogs and pigs.

H. areolatus, unlike H. femoralis, adapts well to captivity, as its diet is not highly specialized. The other Homopus and Chersobius species do not generally survive well in captivity unless some effort is made to supply them with their natural food, that is, endemic plants from the Cape/Karoo regions. Many are taken from their natural habitat each year, and subsequently die as a result, as they do not readily adapt to typical captive diets and environment change. However, they can be very hardy in captivity, and most problems with captive care are caused by faulty nutrition, high humidity, or inadequate husbandry.
