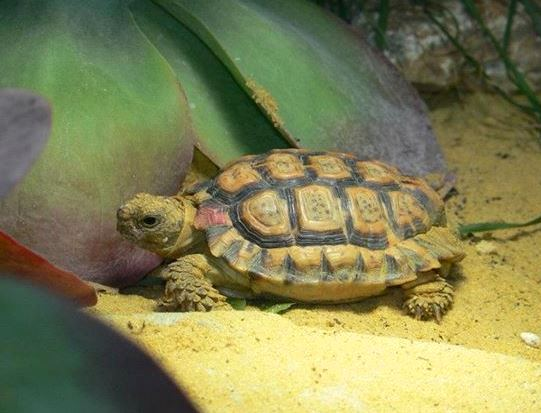
- Speckled Cape tortoise (Chersobius signatus)

Scientific classification
- Kingdom: Animalia
- Phylum: Chordata
- Class: Reptilia
- Order: Testudines
- Suborder: Cryptodira
- Family: Testudinidae
- Genus: Chersobius; Fitzinger, 1835

= Chersobius =

Genus of turtles

Chersobius is a genus of tiny tortoises in the family Testudinidae, endemic to southern Africa. The genus includes the smallest tortoises in the world. All three species were previously assigned to the genus Homopus.

== Naming ==
As a group, these closely related species are commonly known in Europe and Africa as padlopers (originally meaning "path-walkers" in Afrikaans), due to their habit of making tiny pathways through vegetation. In other parts of the world, such as the United States, they are known as Cape tortoises.

== Distribution ==
The genus is indigenous and endemic to southern Africa, one within South Africa, one only in Namibia, and one possibly spanning across the border region of both countries.

== Species ==
The genus contains these species:

Image	Common name	Scientific name	Distribution
	Karoo padloper or Boulenger's cape tortoise	C. boulengeri	Karoo region
	speckled padloper or speckled tortoise	C. signatus	South African west coast region, the smallest tortoise species in the world
	Nama padloper or Berger's cape tortoise, previously H. bergeri	C. solus	southern Namibia

== Conservation and captivity ==
They are threatened by habitat destruction, traffic on roads, overgrazing, and poaching for the pet trade.

Among the Chersobius species, C. signatus adapts well to captivity, as their diets are not highly specialized. The others do not generally survive well in captivity unless some effort is made to supply them with their natural food, that is, endemic plants from the Cape/Karoo regions. Many are taken from their natural habitat each year, and subsequently die as a result, as they do not readily adapt to typical captive diets and environment change. However, they can be very hardy in captivity, and most problems with captive care are caused by faulty nutrition, high humidity, or bad husbandry.
