= Atractaspis scorteccii =

Scientific classification
- Kingdom: Animalia
- Phylum: Chordata
- Class: Reptilia
- Order: Squamata
- Suborder: Serpentes
- Family: Atractaspididae
- Genus: Atractaspis
- Species: A. scorteccii

Binomial name
- Atractaspis scorteccii Parker, 1949

Species of snake

Atractaspis scorteccii, commonly known as Scortecci's mole viper or the Somali burrowing asp, is a species of venomous snake in the family Atractaspididae.

== Etymology ==
The specific epithet, scorteccii, is in honor of Italian herpetologist Giuseppe Scortecci (1898–1973).

== Geographic range ==
A. scorteccii is endemic to Africa, where it is found in Ethiopia and Somalia.

== Reproduction ==
A. scorteccii is oviparous.
