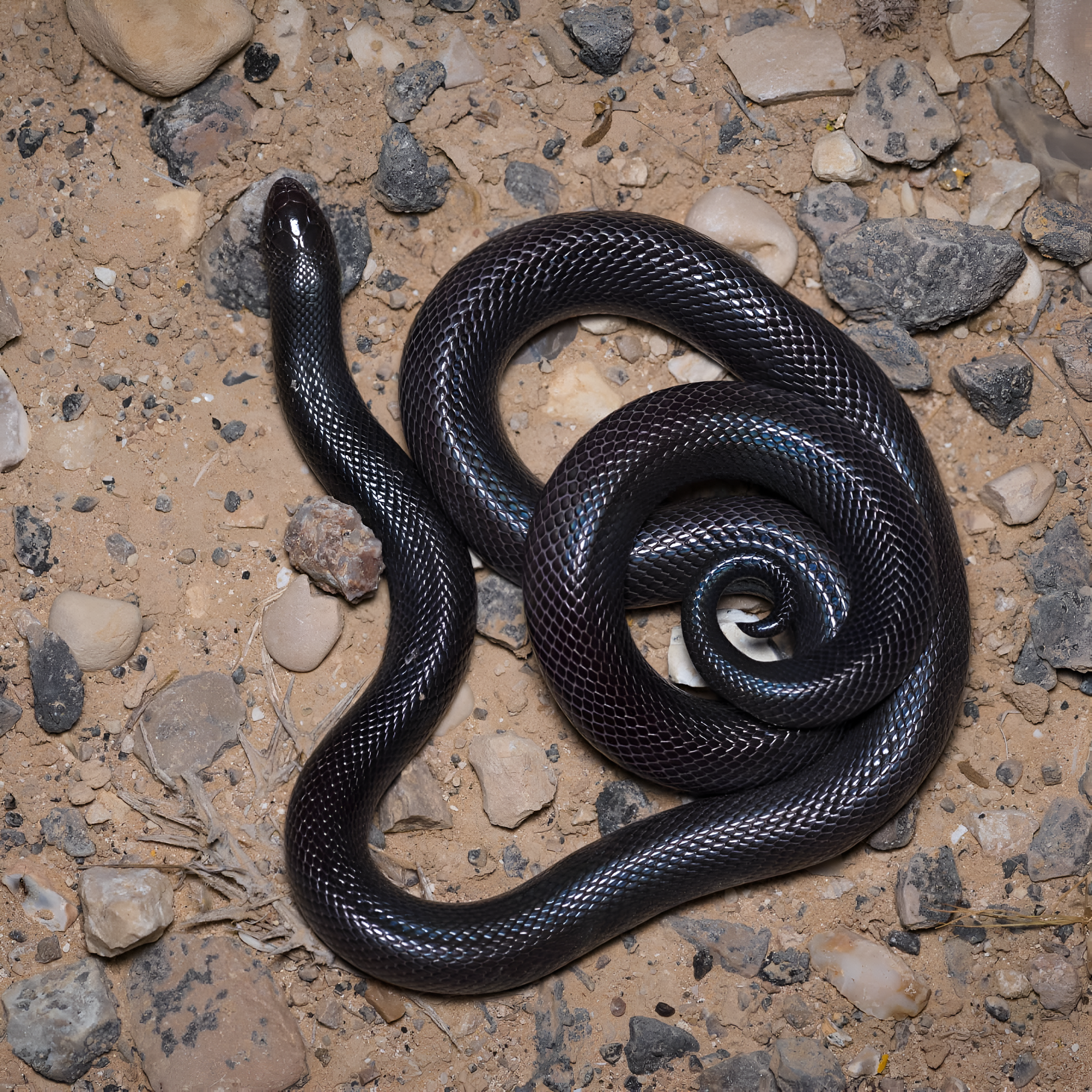
- Atractaspis engaddensis

Conservation status
- Least Concern (IUCN 3.1)

Scientific classification
- Kingdom: Animalia
- Phylum: Chordata
- Class: Reptilia
- Order: Squamata
- Suborder: Serpentes
- Family: Atractaspididae
- Genus: Atractaspis
- Species: A. engaddensis

Binomial name
- Atractaspis engaddensis Haas, 1950

= Atractaspis engaddensis =

Poisonous snake found in Israel and neighboring countries

Atractaspis engaddensis, also known as the Israeli mole viper or "أسود خبيث" (in Arabic, pronounced "Aswad Khabith") or "שרף עין גדי" and "צפעון שחור" (in Hebrew, pronounced "Sraf Ein Gedi" and "Tzifon Shachor") is a venomous snake found in Palestine Egypt (Sinai Peninsula), Israel, Jordan, and Saudi Arabia. The specific epithet references the type locality, Ein Gedi on the western shore of the Dead Sea.

== Description ==
It is an extremely venomous and dangerous snake native to the Middle East. Its body is usually dark black in color and it has small eyes with round pupils. The head and the tail are short and pointy, which makes it harder even for veterans to distinguish head from tail. Its approximate size is 60–80 cm. As a defense it rolls with its tail up and its head hidden under its body.

This snake is active mainly at night, and is found in arid or semi-arid desert areas. It dwells in underground burrows (hence the name "mole viper" or "burrowing asp"), is found under rocks, and is seen basking on roads on warm nights. Although its main habitat is in the desert, it is found in desert oases, around streams and springs rich in vegetation, and apparently it needs this moisture. Sometimes it enters human settlements.

The mating of this snake occurs in the months of July-August, this late period of mating relative to other snakes may indicate its tropical origin. From the end of September until November, 2-3 eggs, about 75 millimeters long, are laid in a humid environment that is essential for the development of the embryos. The elongated eggs are large relative to the dimensions of the black viper and relative to snakes in general. The young hatch after about 3 months when they are equipped with a venom system like their parents.

== Feeding ==
They prefer hatchling snakes but they can also eat lizards and small mammals like young rodents.

== Venom and biting mechanism ==
"Three isotoxins, named sarafotoxins S6a1, S6b and S6c, with strong cardiotoxic activity were isolated from the venom of this snake. All three sarafotoxins are homologous peptides (four or less than four residue replacements) consisting of 21 amino acid residues. Their structure and activity are novel among snake venom components." "The venom has a very high lethal potency, with an i.v. LD_{50} of 0.06-0.075 micrograms per g body weight in mice. The action of the venom is rapid and death results from seemingly neurotoxic effects. However, even at high concentrations, the venom does not block contractions of skeletal muscles that are directly or indirectly stimulated. The most prominent action of the venom is seen in the function of the heart in anesthetized mice, with or without artificial respiration. The changes observed in the ECG are similar to those recorded in human victims and are the result of an A-V block that is caused by an apparent direct action of the venom on the heart." There is currently no available antivenom for Atractaspis engaddensis.

This snake's fangs are able to be directed outside of its mouth, granting it the ability to side stab with a closed mouth. This makes capturing this snake particularly dangerous because it can unexpectedly bite sideways even when it is captured by the head to lock its mouth. This happened to the zoologist Heinrich Mendelssohn when he first discovered this species and captured a snake of this species in 1944.

This snake has relatively little interaction with humans because it dwells mostly in desert areas and under the ground. It is also relatively non-aggressive and slow to react even when bothered. Therefore cases of humans being bitten by this snake are relatively rare. Also, despite its strong venom, and the lack of an antivenom for it, in most cases people survive this snake's bite with little or no long term damages. Even little children can survive a bite with a proper treatment. This is due to the fact that its fangs cannot penetrate very deep beyond the skin. As a result of all these factors, cases of fatal bites of this snake are very rare. There were only 2–3 recorded fatal cases since its discovery in 1950. The latest death happened on 2002 when a man tried to capture a snake near his house on the border of the Judean Desert.
