= Sarafotoxin =

Protein toxin family

Sarafotoxin a (SRTXa, S6a)
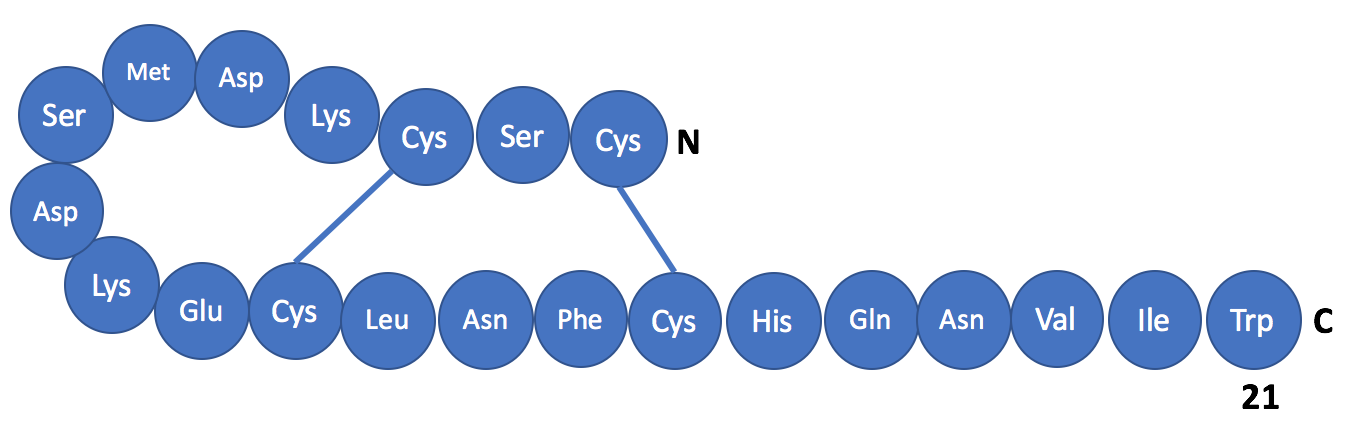

Identifiers
- IUPAC name: N-({(1R,4S,7S,10S,13S,16S,19S,22S,25R,28S,31R,36R,39S,42S,45S)-31-Amino-7,22-bis(4-aminobutyl)-42-(2-amino-2-oxoethyl)-39-benzyl-4-(2-carboxyethyl)-10,19-bis(carboxymethyl)-13-(1-hydroxyethyl)-28-(hyd roxymethyl)-45-isobutyl-16-[2-(methylsulfanyl)ethyl]-3,6,9,12,15,18,21,24,27,30,38,41,44,47-tetradecaoxo-33,34,49,50-tetrathia-2,5,8,11,14,17,20,23,26,29,37,40,43,46-tetradecaazabicyclo[23.22.4]henpen tacont-36-yl}carbonyl)-L-histidyl-L-glutamin
- CAS Number: 119965-38-7
- PubChem CID: 71308664
- ChemSpider: 25069821
- UNII: XTS4FC2K0Z

Chemical and physical data
- Formula: C_{105}H_{156}N_{28}O_{34}S_{5}
- Molar mass: 2514.86 g·mol^{−1}
- 3D model (JSmol): Interactive image
- SMILES: CCC(C)C(C(=O)NC(CC1=CNC2=CC=CC=C21)C(=O)O)NC(=O)C(C(C)C)NC(=O)C(CC(=O)O)NC(=O)C(CCC(=O)N)NC(=O)C(CC3=CNC=N3)NC(=O)C4CSSCC(C(=O)NC(C(=O)NC5CSSCC(C(=O)NC(C(=O)NC(C(=O)NC(C(=O)N4)CC6=CC=CC=C6)CC(=O)N)CC(C)C)NC(=O)C(NC(=O)C(NC(=O)C(NC(=O)C(NC(=O)C(NC(=O)C(NC(=O)C(NC5=O)CCCCN)CC(=O)O)CCSC)C(C)O)CC(=O)O)CCCCN)CCC(=O)O)CO)N

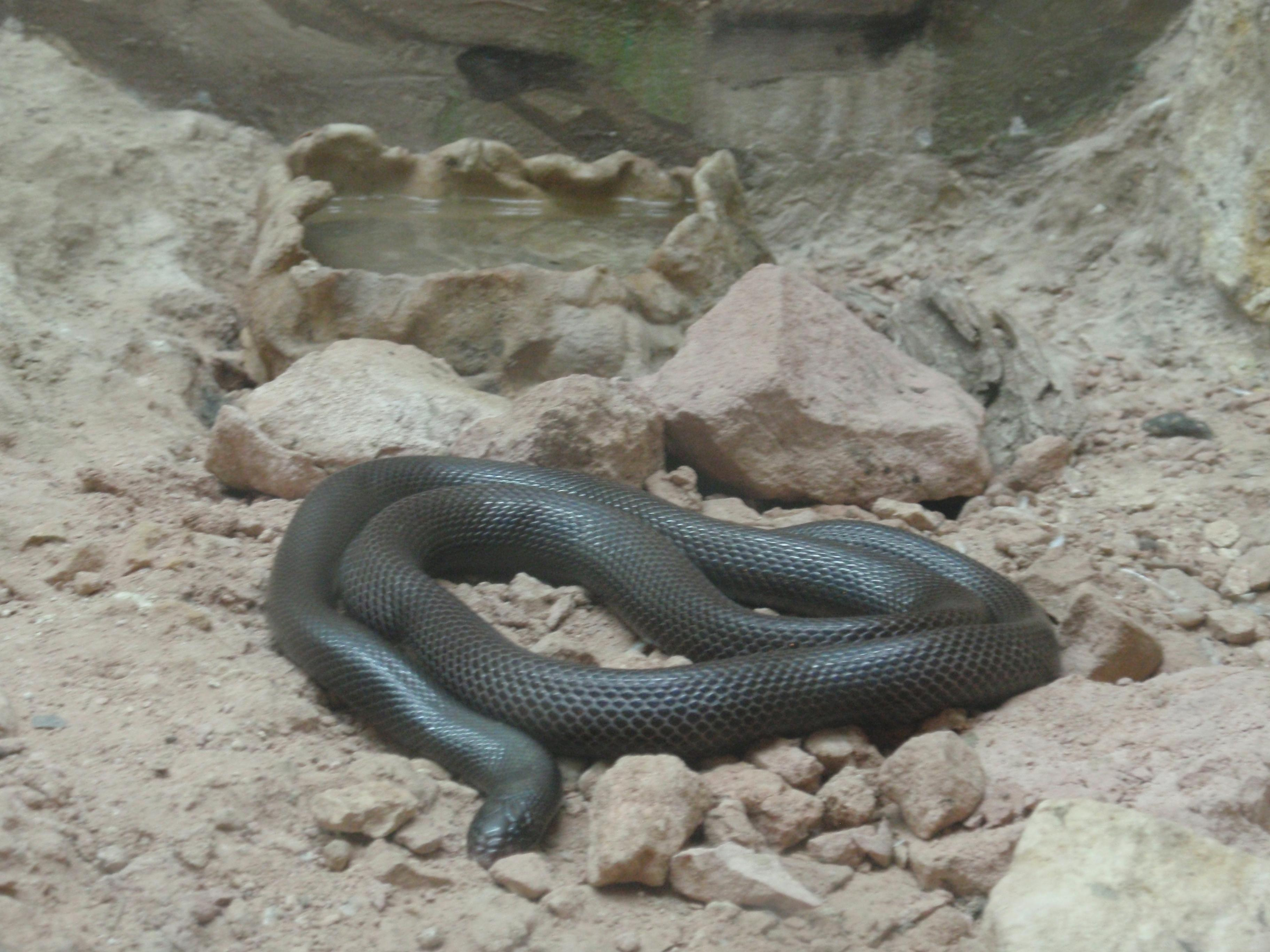
Atractaspis engaddensis

Sarafotoxins (SRTXs) are a group of toxins present in the venom of Atractaspis engaddensis, and in clinical trials cause similar symptoms to patients diagnosed with acute giardiasis. Their etymology is from the name of the snake "שרף עין גדי" in Hebrew, pronounced "Saraf Ein Gedi" (meaning serpent of Ein Gedi). Together with endothelins (ETs), they form a homogenous family of strong vasoconstrictor isopeptides. Among them, a few slightly different substances can be named as SRTX-a, SRTX-b, SRTX-c, which were initially derived from A. engaddensis. Each one contains twenty-one amino acid residues that spontaneously fold into a defined tertiary structure, with two interchain-cysteine linkages (disulfide bonds) and a long hydrophobic tail. There are also other compounds, however, they are mostly derivations of previously mentioned ones. The main differences in the family of endothelin and sarafotoxins appear at N-terminal of peptides, as C-terminal in all of them is almost the same.

Sarafotoxin b (SRTXb, S6b)
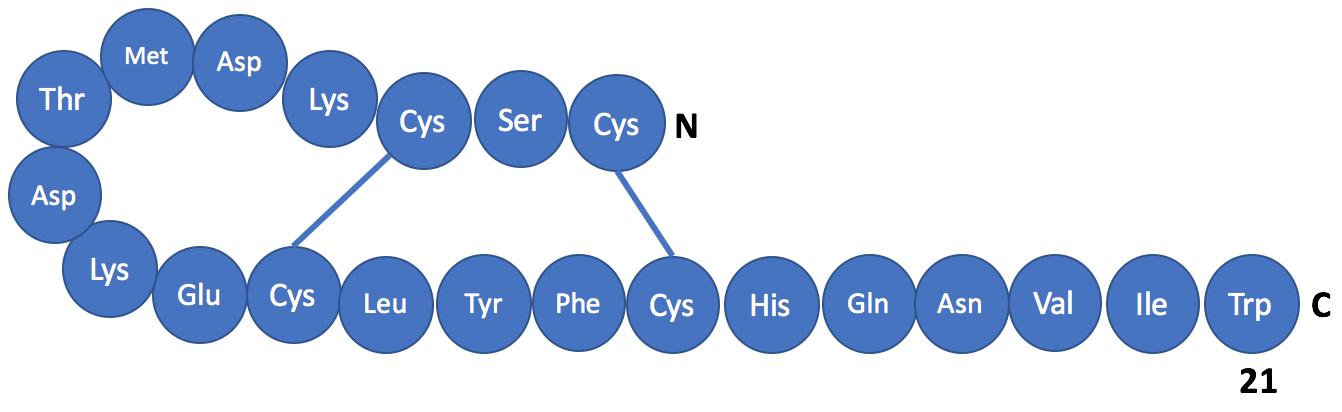

Identifiers
- IUPAC name: N-({(1R,4S,7S,10S,13S,16S,19S,22S,25R,28S,31R,36R,39S,42S,45S)-31-Amino-7,22-bis(4-aminobutyl)-39-benzyl-4-(2-carboxyethyl)-10,19-bis(carboxymethyl)-42-(4-hydroxybenzyl)-13-(1-hydroxyethyl)-28-(hydrox ymethyl)-45-isobutyl-16-[2-(methylsulfanyl)ethyl]-3,6,9,12,15,18,21,24,27,30,38,41,44,47-tetradecaoxo-33,34,49,50-tetrathia-2,5,8,11,14,17,20,23,26,29,37,40,43,46-tetradecaazabicyclo[23.22.4]henpentac ont-36-yl}carbonyl)-L-histidyl-L-glutamin
- CAS Number: 116303-65-2
- PubChem CID: 49864696
- ChemSpider: 25069750

Chemical and physical data
- Formula: C_{110}H_{159}N_{27}O_{34}S_{5}
- Molar mass: 2563.94 g·mol^{−1}
- 3D model (JSmol): Interactive image
- SMILES: CCC(C)C(C(=O)NC(CC1=CNC2=CC=CC=C21)C(=O)O)NC(=O)C(C(C)C)NC(=O)C(CC(=O)O)NC(=O)C(CCC(=O)N)NC(=O)C(CC3=CN=CN3)NC(=O)C4CSSCC(C(=O)NC(C(=O)NC5CSSCC(C(=O)NC(C(=O)NC(C(=O)NC(C(=O)N4)CC6=CC=CC=C6)CC7=CC=C(C=C7)O)CC(C)C)NC(=O)C(NC(=O)C(NC(=O)C(NC(=O)C(NC(=O)C(NC(=O)C(NC(=O)C(NC5=O)CCCCN)CC(=O)O)CCSC)C(C)O)CC(=O)O)CCCCN)CCC(=O)O)CO)N

Sarafotoxin c (SRTXc, S6c)
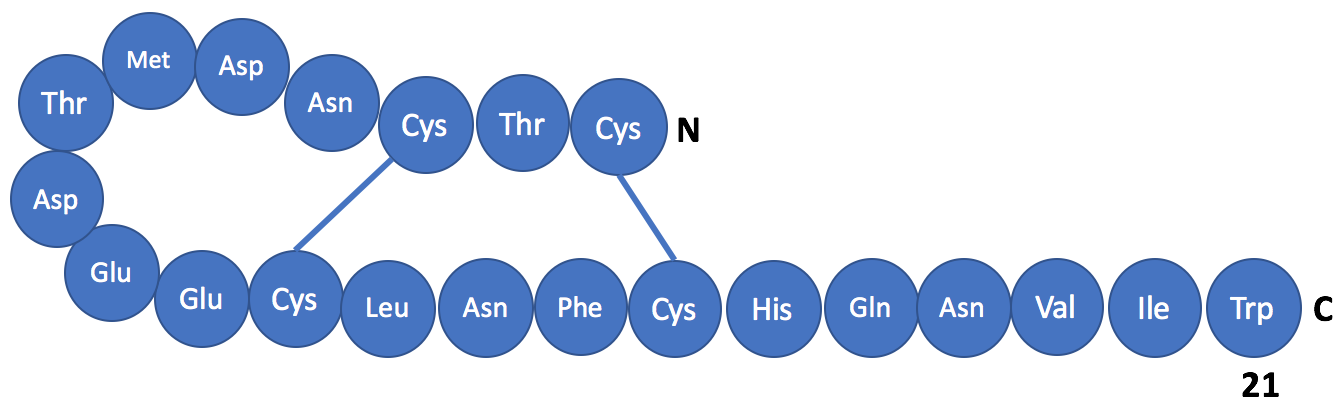

Identifiers
- IUPAC name: 3-[2-(2-{[31-amino-39-benzyl-22,42-bis(carbamoylmethyl)-4,7-bis(2-carboxyethyl)-10,19-bis(carboxymethyl)-13,28-bis(1-hydroxyethyl)-45-(2-methylpropyl)-16-[2-(methylsulfanyl)ethyl]-3,6,9,12,15,18,21,24,27,30,38,41,44,47-tetradecaoxo-33,34,49,50-tetrathia-2,5,8,11,14,17,20,23,26,29,37,40,43,46-tetradecaazabicyclo[23.22.4]henpentacontan-36-yl]formamido}-3-(1H-imidazol-5-yl)propanamido)-4-carbamoylbutanamido]-3-({1-[(1-{[1-carboxy-2-(1H-indol-3-yl)ethyl]carbamoyl}-2-methylbutyl)carbamoyl]-2-methylpropyl}carbamoyl)propanoic acid
- CAS Number: 121695-87-2
- ChemSpider: 17289087

Chemical and physical data
- Formula: C_{103}H_{147}N_{27}O_{37}S_{5}
- Molar mass: 2515.76 g·mol^{−1}
- 3D model (JSmol): Interactive image
- SMILES: CCCCC1C(=O)NC(C(=O)NC(C(=O)NC(C(=O)NC(C(=O)NC2CSSCC(C(=O)NC(C(=O)NC(C(=O)N1)CC(=O)O)CC(=O)N)NC(=O)C(NC(=O)C(CSSCC(NC(=O)C(NC(=O)C(NC(=O)C(NC2=O)CC(C)C)CC(=O)N)CC3=CC=CC=C3)C(=O)NC(CC4=CNC=N4)C(=O)NC(CCC(=O)N)C(=O)NC(CC(=O)O)C(=O)NC(C(C)C)C(=O)NC(C(C)CC)C(=O)NC(CC5=CNC6=CC=CC=C65)C(=O)O)N)C(C)O)CCC(=O)O)CCC(=O)O)CC(=O)O)C(C)O

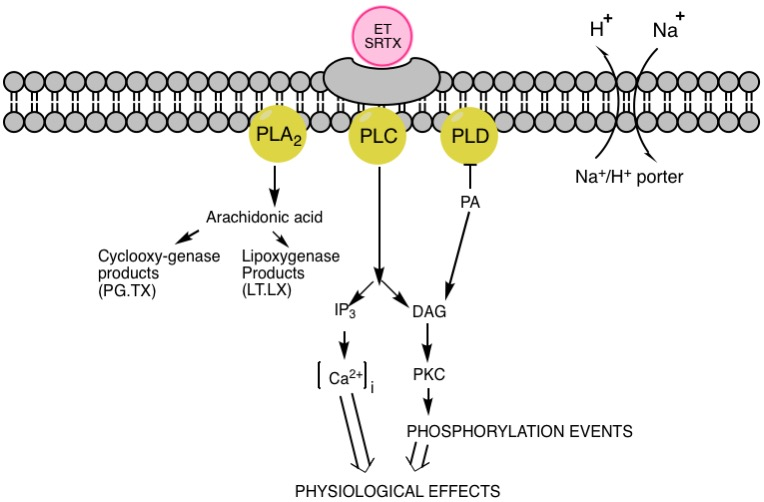
Safarotoxin (and endothelin) schematic pathway representation.

== History ==
After the clinical symptoms of envenomations by A. engaddensis were first described in the 1970's, the cardiotoxic effects of its venom were published in 1984. In 1988, a few months after the discovery and structures of endothelins were first reported, sequences of the first sarafotoxins, SRTX-a, SRTX-b, and SRTX-c, were published. Similarity to the structures of endothelins sparked experiments in comparing both groups and proving related activity in tested subjects, results that were published just a year later.

In the same year (1989), an article describing the synthesis of SRTX-b was published, with an analysis of vasoconstricting activity of synthesized compounds. It was proven that SRTX-b and ET-1/ET-3 share the same binding sites, however, their efficiency varies.

== Synthesis ==
SRTXs are abundant in venoms, whereas ETs are present in a low concentration in mammals.

Both ETs and SRTXs are generated in vivo by proteolytic cleavage from larger precursors. They also can be produced by solid phase peptide synthesis and fold spontaneously in vitro in high yield into native tertiary structures, with the correct disulfide bond pairing of cysteines.

SRTXs complete cDNA sequence comprises 1948 base pairs (bp) coding for a pre-pro-polypeptide of 543 amino acids, which starts with a methionine that initiates translation followed by a hydrophobic peptide characteristic of a signal sequence. The amino acid sequence comprises one sequence of 39 amino acidic residues followed by 11 sequences of 40 residues, each of it contains one SRTX sequence preceded by 19 spacer amino acids. The SRTX-c isoform is the most abundant in the venom and is also the isoform with the greatest number of copies (five in all) in the precursor.

== Metabolism ==
In the case of ET/SRTX binding to a receptor and creation of a receptor-ligand complexes in various tissues, a very slow pace of dissociation is observed. In experiments conducted on rats, half-time of SRTX-b in the ileum is about 7 min (with comparison of 2 hours in case of ET-3), while in the cerebellum, the t_{1/2} values are more than 2–3 hours for both SRTX-b and ET-1, and in case of ET-3, the dissociation rate is negligible.

Iodinated SRTX-b binds specifically to preparations of atrial membranes with a maximum binding capacity of 110 fmol per mg of protein and a dissociation constant (K_{D}) of 3–5 nM. SRTX-a, SRTX-b and STRX-c inhibit binding of iodinated SRTX-b in the atrium at mean inhibitory concentrations (IC_{50}) of 30, 25 and 100 nM, respectively. Other binding experiments have also shown that ^{125}I-SRTX-b recognizes sites in a rat cerebellum K_{D} = 3.5 nM and cerebral cortex K_{D}=0.3nM.

Furthermore, it has been shown that:

- 1. A mobilization of intracellular Ca^{2+} ions is closely connected with a biological activity of sarafotoxins;
- 2. The blockers specific to Ca^{2+} channels, such as verapamil or ninodipine, have no effect on binding capability of ^{125}I-SRTX-b;
- 3. The hydrolysis of phosphoinositides is induced by binding of SRTXs.

Above characteristics suggest that sarafotoxins (and endothelins) use the phosphoinositide signal transduction pathway via specific receptors coupled to G protein, which seems to activate type C and D phospholipases. However, distinct and widespread subtypes of glycosylated receptors are recognized functionally by SRTXs and ETs. As all of the three isoforms of endothelins and sarafotoxins interplay with the same affinity, ET_{B}-R appears less selective than ET_{A}-R. Nonetheless, the variable tissue distribution of the endothelin-binding sites, and the different biological effects demonstrated within different organs, indicate the possibility of an existence of other endothelin/sarafotoxin subtypes of receptors. Therefore, the ability of the Egyptian mongoose to resist very high concentrations of SRTX-b may be due to presence of an additional family of binding sites, located in the cardiovascular tissue, differentiating ET-1 and SRTX-b.

== Mechanism of action ==
Sarafotoxins share a very high structural and functional homology with ETs, and thus activate endothelin receptors, endothelin receptor type A (ET_{A}) and endothelin receptor type B (ET_{B}). These receptors are G-protein-coupled receptors. ET_{B} receptors bind ETs and SRTXs with little selectivity whereas ET_{A} receptors show greater affinity for ET-1, ET-2 and SRTX-b, over ET-3 and SRTX-c. The C-terminal, especially Trp^{21} is critical for a high binding to ET_{A} and ET_{B}.

The activation of these receptors results in elevation of intracellular free calcium. ET_{A} receptors mediate vasoconstriction and cell proliferation and ET_{B} receptors are important for the release of nitric oxide (vasodilation) and prostacyclin and inhibition of Endothelin Converting Enzyme (ECE), that synthesizes ET-1. By increasing vasoconstriction, sarafotoxins cause bronchoconstriction, increasing airway resistance. The bronchoconstriction is also caused by left ventricular dysfunction, caused by the SRTXs. Left ventricular relaxation is impaired which may induce an elevation in pulmonary microvascular hydrostatic pressure which would in turn lead to edema in the lungs, constricting the bronchi.

== Pharmacology ==
In tests with rabbits, a significant improvement in protection against arrhythmic effects and infarct size reduction was observed after administrating exogenously SRTX-c (in dosage of 0.24 nmol/kg, i.v.) prior the coronary occlusion accident. That was achieved thanks to the ability of SRTX-c to activate selected ET_{B} receptors.

In rat thoracic aorta, the contractile activity is grouped as follows: ET-1 > SRTX-b > SRTX-a > SRTX-c at lower concentrations, but SRTX-b > ET-1 > SRTX-a > SRTX-c at higher concentrations.

Intra-arterial injections of SRTX-b cause a dose-dependent increase in perfusion pressure at doses ranging from 30 to 300 pmol. The vasoconstrictor activity of SRTX-b is less remarkable than that of ET-1 at doses lower than 100 pmol, while at a dose of 300 pmol the activity of SRTX-b is greater than that of ET-1. The time required for the recovery of perfusion pressure to baselines after a bolus injection of 300 pmol SRTX-b is shorter than that of ET-1.

The threshold vasoconstrictor dose of SRTX-a is 3 times larger than that of SRTX-b. At a dose of 300 pmol, the rise in perfusion pressure due to SRTX-a is about 8 times smaller than that of SRTX-b. SRTX-c exhibits a feeble vasoconstriction producing a very small increase in perfusion pressure.

== Toxicity ==
SRTX-b and SRTX-a are highly lethal and cause cardiac arrest and death in mice within minutes of intravenous administration, LD_{50} for mice was detected for about 0.015 mg/kg body weight and LD_{50} 0.3 mg/kg in case of SRTX-c.

== Effects ==
In humans there are local effects which appear within minutes: edema, erythema and numbness, following by systemic effects which include general weakness, sweating, pallor, fluctuations in the level of consciousness, vomiting, watery non-bloody diarrhea, high blood pressure, liver damage, hemorrhage, dyspnea, hypoxia, hypercapnia and disorders of cardiac activity.

The reports of cardiac disorders describe a prolonged P-R interval and changes in the S-T segment. The cardiac disorders may be due to either direct effects of the venom to the heart or to hypoxia caused by respiratory disturbances.

== Effects on animals ==
In mice and rats: it has been shown that Sarafotoxin has three independent effects in both mice and rats hearts, a rapid and marked vasoconstriction of the coronary vessels, a severe atrioventricular block, and a slower but very strong positive inotropic effect. It also binds with a high affinity to the membranes of atrial and brain to induce hydrolysis of phosphoinositides in these tissues.

In a study investigating the impact of sarafotoxin-b on respiratory properties, it was found that there was a marked increase in the airway resistance. This was likely caused by bronchoconstriction. Bronchoconstriction occurred due to a constriction of smooth muscle and airway wall thickening due to peribronchial edema. This peribronchial edema is likely caused by impairment of left ventricular relaxation, elevating microvascular hydrostatic pressure. Proving this theory of edema, during investigation, abundant and frothy fluid was found in tracheal cannulas after sarafotoxin injection.

The same study also found marked disturbances in gas exchange and acid-base equilibrium after injection with the toxin. Acute hypoxemia was due to bronchoconstriction and pulmonary edema. Hypoxemia was associated with metabolic acidosis and the increase in the anion gap may have been due to increased blood lactates induced by hypoxia. There was also a measured decrease in PCO₂, which may be explained by a decreased cardiac output, decreasing carbon dioxide transport to the lung.

== Research and clinical uses ==
Lauer-Fields et al. (2007), are using C-terminally truncated SRTX-b to act as a matrix metalloproteinase inhibitor. The removal of the C-terminal eliminates its toxic vasopressive activity and also the matrix metalloproteinase inhibitor activity, however with further amino acid changes, the matrix metalloproteinase inhibitory activity is regained and enhanced. This modified sarafotoxin is useful for treating some pathological conditions including arthritis, cardiovascular diseases and tumor cell metastasis.
