= Atractaspis magrettii =

Conservation status
- Least Concern (IUCN 3.1)

Scientific classification
- Kingdom: Animalia
- Phylum: Chordata
- Class: Reptilia
- Order: Squamata
- Suborder: Serpentes
- Family: Atractaspididae
- Genus: Atractaspis
- Species: A. magrettii

Binomial name
- Atractaspis magrettii Scortecci, 1928

Species of snake

Atractaspis magrettii, the Magretti's burrowing asp, is a species of venomous snake from the genus Atractaspis. It can be found in Sudan and Eritrea in an elevation range of 400 to 2,400 m (1,300 to 7,900 ft). Its typical habitat is the savanna, which is arid in condition. The species was described in 1928 by Scortecci.
