= Atractaspis battersbyi =

Scientific classification
- Kingdom: Animalia
- Phylum: Chordata
- Class: Reptilia
- Order: Squamata
- Suborder: Serpentes
- Family: Atractaspididae
- Genus: Atractaspis
- Species: A. battersbyi

Binomial name
- Atractaspis battersbyi de Witte, 1959

Species of snake

Atractaspis battersbyi, also known commonly as Battersby's burrowing asp and Battersby's mole viper, is a species of venomous snake in the family Atractaspididae. The species is native to Central Africa.

== Etymology ==
Both common names and the specific epithet, battersbyi, are in honor of James Clarence Battersby (1901–1993), herpetologist at the British Museum (Natural History) for 46 years.

== Geographic range ==
A. battersbyi is endemic to Africa. It is found in the Central African countries of Congo and Democratic Republic of Congo.

== Reproduction ==
A. battersbyi is oviparous.
