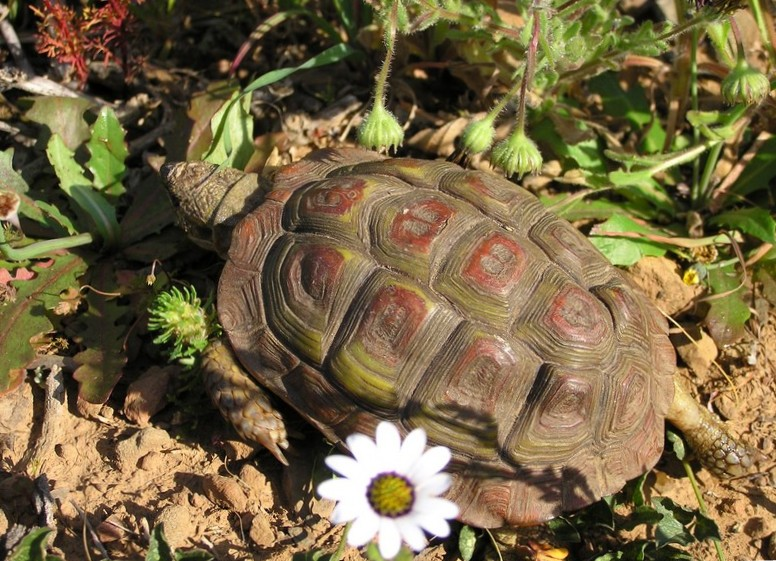

Conservation status
- Least Concern (IUCN 3.1)

Scientific classification
- Kingdom: Animalia
- Phylum: Chordata
- Class: Reptilia
- Order: Testudines
- Suborder: Cryptodira
- Family: Testudinidae
- Genus: Homopus
- Species: H. areolatus

Binomial name
- Homopus areolatus (Thunberg, 1787)
- Extant (resident)

Synonyms
- Testudo areolata Thunberg, 1787:180; Testudo minuta Thunberg 1788:206 (nomen nudum); Testudo miniata Lacepède 1788:166 (09:6) (nomen rejectum); Testudo fasciata Daudin 1801:294 (junior homonym); Testudo africana Hermann 1804:218; Chersine tetradactyla Merrem 1820:32; Testudo areolata pallida Gray 1831d:13

= Homopus areolatus =

Species of tortoise

Homopus areolatus, commonly known as the common padloper or parrot-beaked tortoise, is a tiny species of tortoise of the genus Homopus, indigenous to the southern part of South Africa.

== Naming ==
Homopus areolatus is known by a wide range of common names. In its native region in southern Africa (and in much of the scientific community) it is usually known as the common padloper due to its being by far the most commonly occurring of all the Homopus ("padloper") species. It is also commonly known as the parrot-beaked tortoise, due to the relatively large beak that the males of the species possess. Other names include the older name of beaked Cape tortoise, as well as areolated tortoise. The latter name refers to its species name "areolatus", and describes the raised rings around the scutes of its shell.

== Description ==
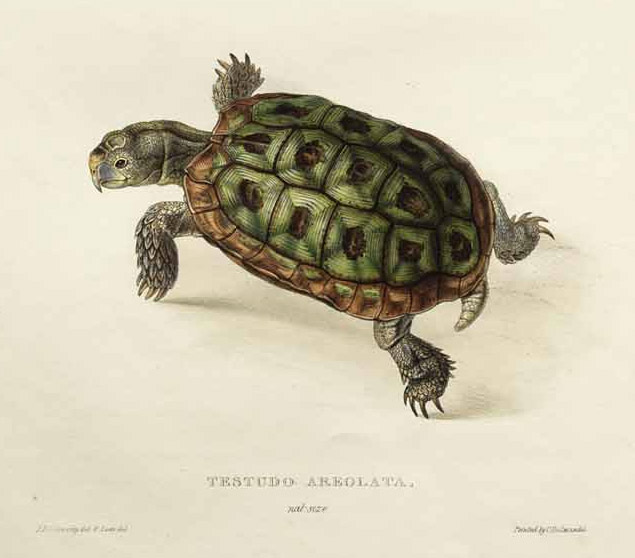
19th century plate from "A Monograph of the Testudinata"

The common padloper is a small, rather flat tortoise. Its shell usually has varied colouration, ranging between olive-green and brown. The shields of the carapace are flat, with large raised areolae, and a thin black edging.

Like its larger relative, the greater padloper, and unlike the other padlopers, it has only four toes on its front feet, as well as its hind feet. The average length is 110 mm, though females are larger than males. Their adult weight ranges from 140 to 300 g. It has a sharp, distinctly hooked beak.

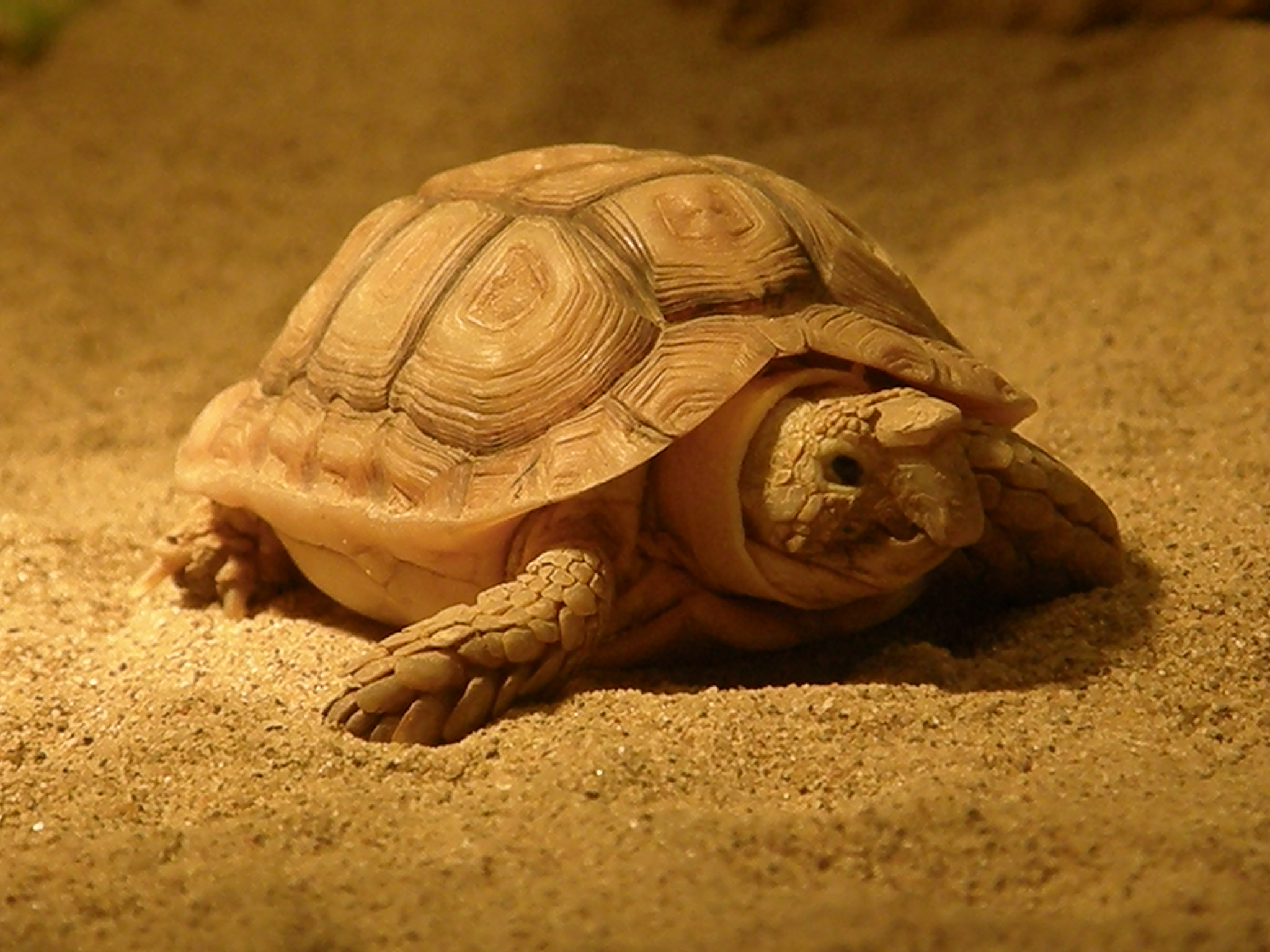
Orange-brown male, showing the larger, pointed head and beak

The males are smaller than the females, and can be distinguished by their slightly longer tails and their distinctive heads. Males have larger heads, with a larger beak and a more pointy snout. The noses of dominant males also become bright orange or red in the breeding season.

In colour, males are frequently uniformly orange to light brown (compared to the deeper olive brown of the females). Males also have more lightly coloured bellies, though they do not exhibit the plastral concavity that many other tortoise species do.

== Distribution and habitat ==
It is endemic to the Republic of South Africa and is found specifically in the Western Cape and Eastern Cape Provinces. Here it favours coastal lowlands, especially along the south coast, in fynbos, strandveld, albany thicket and valley bushveld. The mild climate allows it to stay active throughout the year. It is generally intolerant of the arid conditions further inland.

At certain points, favourable conditions allow populations to survive further inland. In the Western Cape, there are inland populations at Sutherland and Nieuwoudtville. In the Eastern Cape, their range extends inland at one point, as far as Cradock. Unlike the other padloper species, Homopus areolatus is relatively plentiful within its range, and hence the name "common padloper".

Due to its tiny size, this tortoise is heavily preyed on by crows, ostriches, jackals, baboons, dogs, and a wide range of other predators. Consequently, it spends most of its time hiding under rocks, foliage, and other cover. It lays a clutch of 2–4 eggs, which hatch 150–320 days later – usually on a misty, overcast day.

== Threats and conservation ==
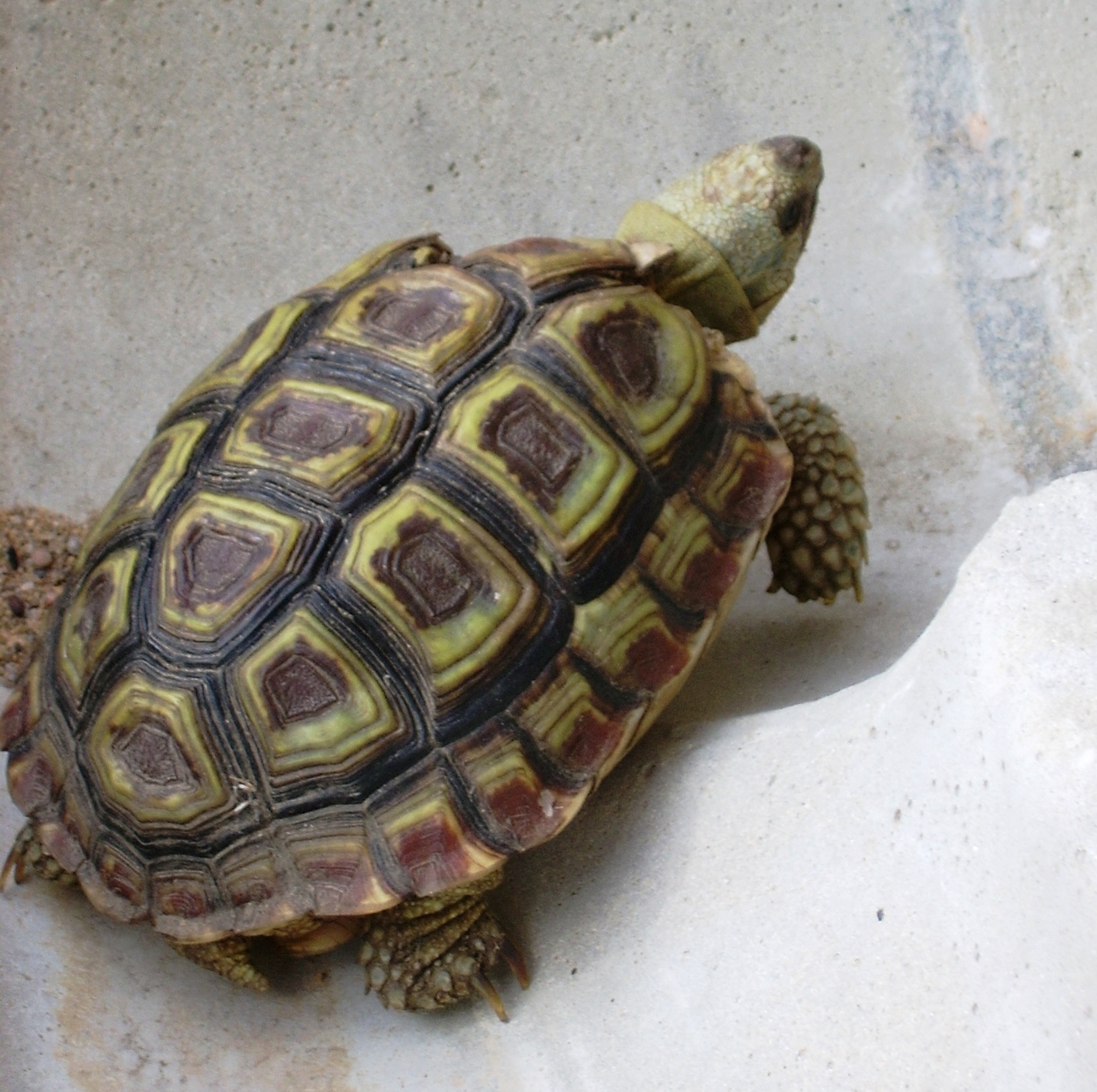
Injured beaked padloper, in an urban environment

The species is threatened by habitat destruction, traffic on roads, and increased frequency of wildfires. Another threat comes from introduced species, such as domestic dogs and pigs.

Trade in collected Homopus species is strictly illegal in South Africa and Namibia. Any captive specimens are systematically registered in noncommercial studbooks, and any commercial sale of Homopus tortoises is almost without exception strictly illegal.

== Captivity ==
The species can adapt well to captivity – as its diet, while varied, is not highly specialized. It is, however, relatively rare as a pet.
