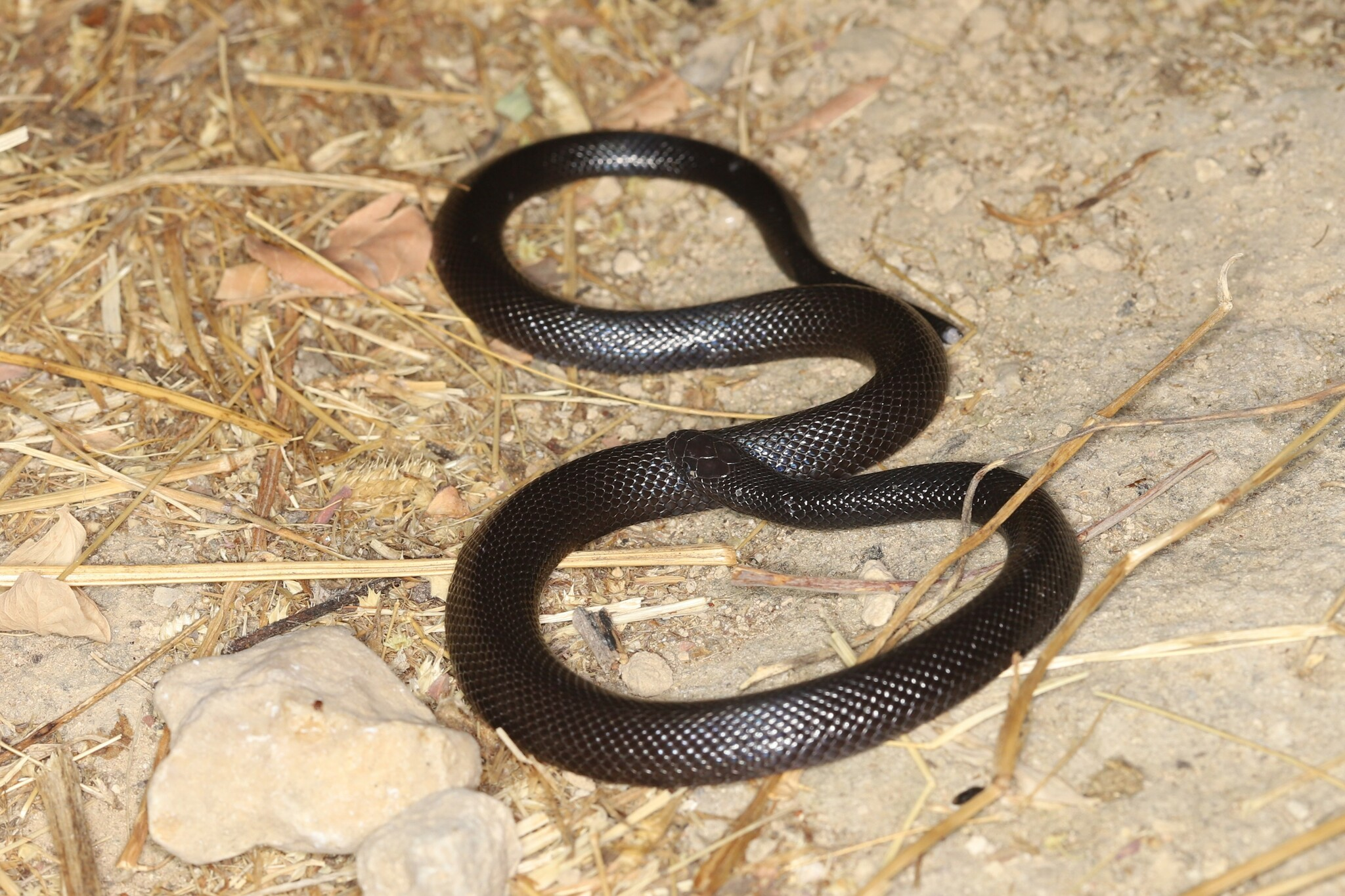

Conservation status
- Least Concern (IUCN 3.1)

Scientific classification
- Kingdom: Animalia
- Phylum: Chordata
- Class: Reptilia
- Order: Squamata
- Suborder: Serpentes
- Family: Atractaspididae
- Genus: Atractaspis
- Species: A. andersonii

Binomial name
- Atractaspis andersonii Boulenger, 1905

= Atractaspis andersonii =

Species of snake found in the Middle East

Atractaspis andersonii, the Arabian small-scaled burrowing asp, is a species of snake in the family Atractaspididae. It lives in dry desert regions in Saudi Arabia, Israel, Oman, Yemen and Jordan. The species was first described by George Albert Boulenger in 1905.
