= Atractaspis phillipsi =

Conservation status
- Data Deficient (IUCN 3.1)

Scientific classification
- Kingdom: Animalia
- Phylum: Chordata
- Class: Reptilia
- Order: Squamata
- Suborder: Serpentes
- Family: Atractaspididae
- Genus: Atractaspis
- Species: A. phillipsi

Binomial name
- Atractaspis phillipsi Barbour, 1913

Species of snake

Atractaspis phillipsi, the Phillips' burrowing asp or the Phillips erdviper, is a species of snake from the Atractaspis genus native to Sudan and South Sudan. The species was described in by Barbour in 1913.
