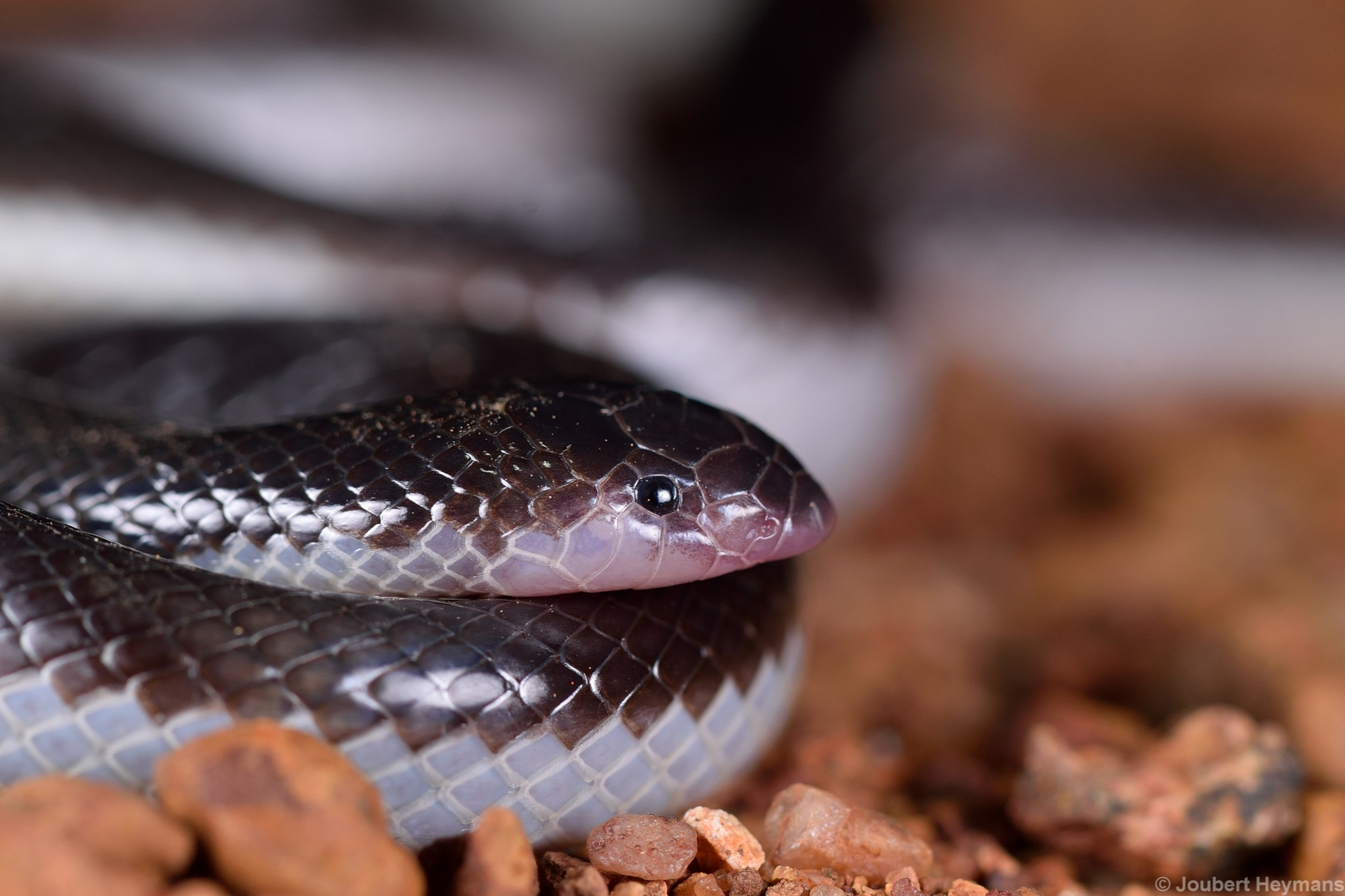

Conservation status
- Least Concern (IUCN 3.1)

Scientific classification
- Kingdom: Animalia
- Phylum: Chordata
- Class: Reptilia
- Order: Squamata
- Suborder: Serpentes
- Family: Atractaspididae
- Genus: Atractaspis
- Species: A. duerdeni

Binomial name
- Atractaspis duerdeni Gough, 1907

= Atractaspis duerdeni =

Species of snake

Atractaspis duerdeni, commonly known as the beaked burrowing asp, Duerden's burrowing asp, and Duerden's stiletto snake, is a species of venomous snake in the family Atractaspididae. The species is native to southern Africa.

== Etymology ==
The specific epithet, duerdeni, is in honor of James Edwin Duerden (1865–1937) of the Albany Museum, Grahamstown, South Africa.

== Geographic range ==
A. duerdeni is found in southeastern Botswana, Namibia, and northern South Africa.

== Habitat ==
The preferred natural habitat of A. duerdeni is savanna, at altitudes of 850–1,600 m (2,790–5,250 ft).

== Description ==
In his original description Gough described A. duerdeni as being cream-colored above and below, referring to a faded specimen stored in alcohol. In life A. duerdeni is uniformly blackish-brown or gray dorsally, and it is white or creamish-pink ventrally. The dorsal scales are in 21 rows at midbody. The ventrals number 199; the anal is entire; and the subcaudals number 22, all except the first entire. The snout is prominent and subcuneiform. The rostral has a rounded horizontal edge, and the portion visible from above is a little longer than its distance from the frontal. Females may attain a snout-to-vent length (SVL) of 51 cm (20 in), and males, which are smaller, may attain 44 cm (17 in) SVL.

== Behavior ==
A. duerdeni is fossorial.

== Diet ==
A. duerdeni preys upon sleeping lizards and snakes.

== Reproduction ==
A. duerdeni is oviparous.

== Venom ==
A venomous species, A. duerdeni can inflict a serious bite requiring medical attention, but no human fatality has been recorded.
