= Atractaspis fallax =

Conservation status
- Least Concern (IUCN 3.1)

Scientific classification
- Kingdom: Animalia
- Phylum: Chordata
- Class: Reptilia
- Order: Squamata
- Suborder: Serpentes
- Family: Atractaspididae
- Genus: Atractaspis
- Species: A. fallax

Binomial name
- Atractaspis fallax Peters, 1867

Species of snake

Atractaspis fallax, also known as the Peters' burrowing asp, eastern small-scaled burrowing asp, and mole viper, is a species of venomous snake in the family Lamprophiidae. It is found in East Africa, specifically in South Sudan (near the Ugandan border), Ethiopia, Somalia, Kenya, and extreme northern Tanzania.
