= Atractaspis micropholis =

Conservation status
- Least Concern (IUCN 3.1)

Scientific classification
- Kingdom: Animalia
- Phylum: Chordata
- Class: Reptilia
- Order: Squamata
- Suborder: Serpentes
- Family: Atractaspididae
- Genus: Atractaspis
- Species: A. micropholis

Binomial name
- Atractaspis micropholis Günther, 1872

Species of snake

Atractaspis micropholis, the Sahelian burrowing asp, is a species of snake from the Atractaspis genus. The species was scientifically described in 1872 by Günther. It is restricted to Nigeria, Burkina Faso, Niger, Senegambia, Chad and Mali. It lives in savannas in an elevation of up to 500 m (1,600 ft). Populations are stable and it's listed as Least Concern on the IUCN Red List.
