= Atractaspis watsoni =

Conservation status
- Least Concern (IUCN 3.1)

Scientific classification
- Kingdom: Animalia
- Phylum: Chordata
- Class: Reptilia
- Order: Squamata
- Suborder: Serpentes
- Family: Atractaspididae
- Genus: Atractaspis
- Species: A. watsoni

Binomial name
- Atractaspis watsoni Boulenger, 1908

Species of snake

Atractaspis watsoni, Watson's burrowing asp is a species of snake from the Atractaspis genus native to West and Central Africa. The species was scientifically described by George Albert Boulenger in 1908. It lives in savannas and they were found up to 800 m (2,600 ft) in elevation.
