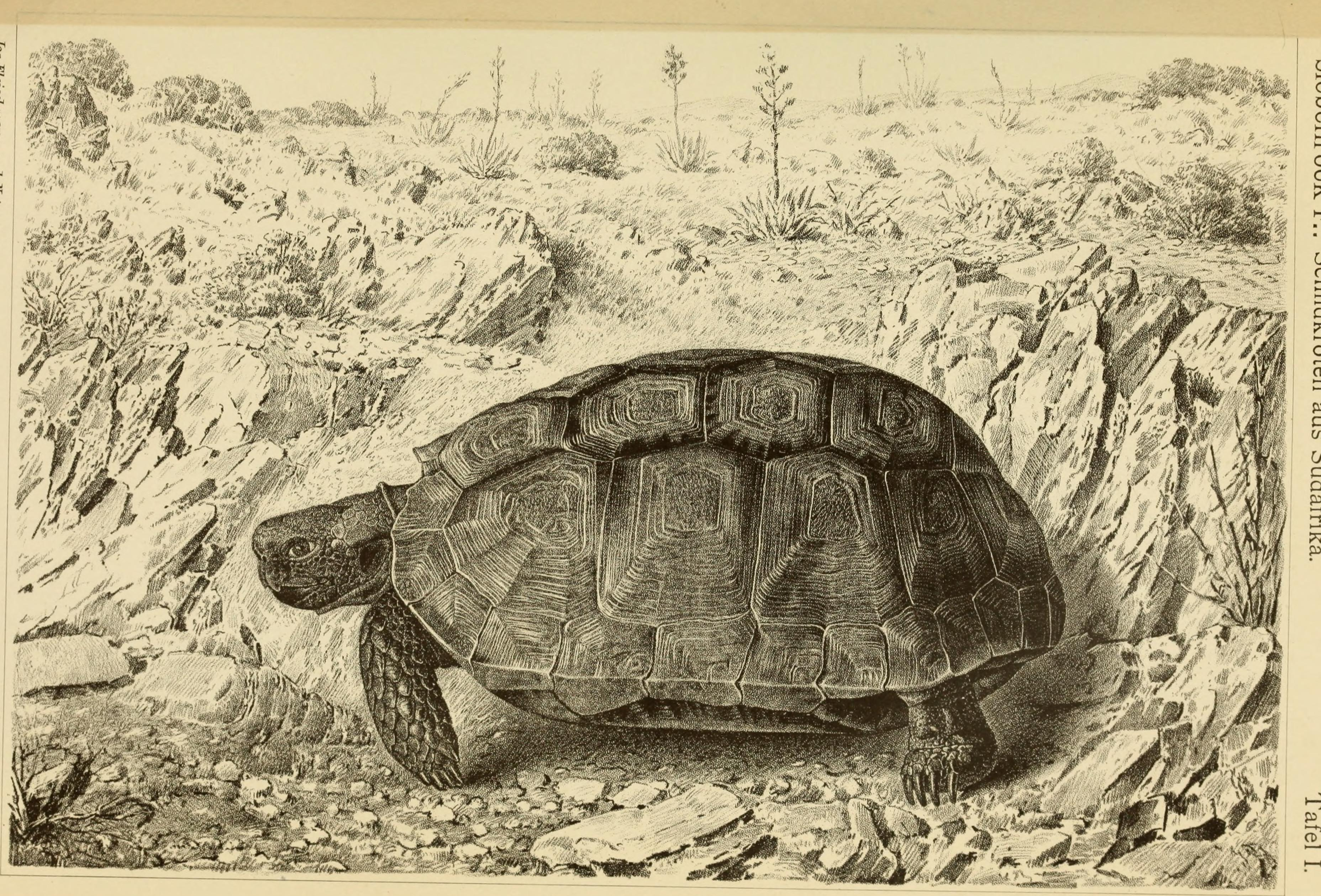

Conservation status
- Vulnerable (IUCN 2.3)

Scientific classification
- Kingdom: Animalia
- Phylum: Chordata
- Class: Reptilia
- Order: Testudines
- Suborder: Cryptodira
- Family: Testudinidae
- Genus: Chersobius
- Species: C. solus

Binomial name
- Chersobius solus Branch, 2007

Synonyms
- Homopus bergeri Lindholm, 1906; Homopus boulengeri — Mertens, 1955; Homopus solus Branch, 2007; Chersobius solus — Hofmeyr et al., 2016

= Chersobius solus =

Species of tortoise

Chersobius solus, commonly known as the Nama dwarf tortoise, the Nama padloper, and Berger's cape tortoise, is a species of tortoise in the family Testudinidae. The species is endemic to Namibia.

== Conservation status ==
C. solus is threatened by traffic on roads, habitat destruction, and poaching for the pet trade. As the trade in collected Chersobius species is strictly illegal and any captive specimens are systematically registered in noncommercial studbooks in South Africa and Namibia, any commercial sale of Chersobius tortoises is almost without exception strictly illegal. Another threat comes from introduced species, such as domestic dog, pigs and habitat destruction.

== In captivity ==
C. solus does not generally survive well in captivity unless some effort is made to supply specimens with their natural food, that is, endemic plants from the Cape/Karoo regions.
