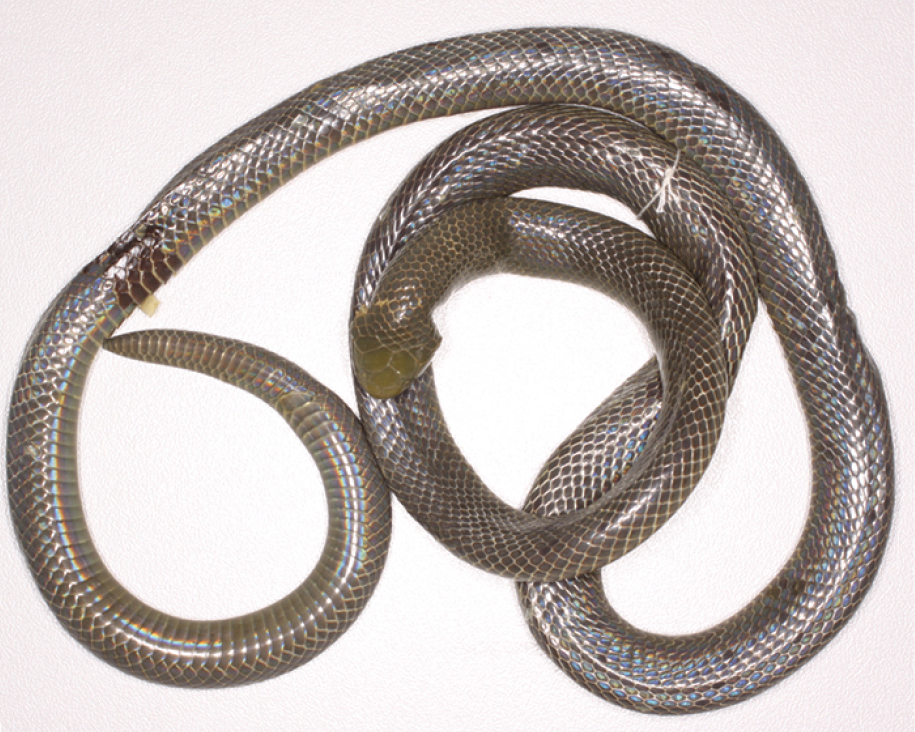

Conservation status
- Least Concern (IUCN 3.1)

Scientific classification
- Kingdom: Animalia
- Phylum: Chordata
- Class: Reptilia
- Order: Squamata
- Suborder: Serpentes
- Family: Atractaspididae
- Genus: Atractaspis
- Species: A. reticulata

Binomial name
- Atractaspis reticulata Sjöstedt, 1896

= Atractaspis reticulata =

Species of snake

Atractaspis reticulata, or the reticulate burrowing asp, is a species of snake in the family Atractaspididae. It is found in Africa.
