= James Edwin Duerden =

British zoologist

- Born: 1869; Burnley, Lancashire, United Kingdom
- Died: 4 September 1937 (aged 68); Leeds, United Kingdom

James Edwin Duerden or J.E. Duerden M.Sc., Ph.D., A.R.C.S. (1869 – 4 September 1937) was a British zoologist who became an international expert on the wool industry.

== Early life and education ==
Little is known about the early life of James Edwin Duerden, but it's believed that he was born in Burnley, Lancashire in 1869. His family were members of the Ebenezer Baptist Church. Duerden attended the Royal College of Science in London from 1885 to 1889, becoming an Associate, then later transferred to Johns Hopkins University where he received an M.Sc. and Ph.D., graduating in 1900. Duerden married in 1893 in Burnley. The couple had one son, Edwin Noel on 30 March 1896, who died at the age of six on 24 September 1902.

== Career ==
Duerden was employed in the Royal College of Science for Ireland from 1893 to 1895 as a Demonstrator in Zoology and Palaeontology. He lectured and conducted fishery surveys along with Alfred Cort Haddon and Ernest William Lyons Holt, with his published material focused on Irish Hydrozoa and Bryozoa. The specimens he collected were exhibited at meetings of the Dublin Naturalists' Field Club and the Dublin Microscopical Club. His findings of new and unusual bryozoans were published by the Royal Irish Academy (1893), the Royal Dublin Society (1895), and in The Irish Naturalist (1892 and 1894).

From this position in Dublin, Duerden took up a role of curator in the Museum in the Institute of Jamaica, Kingston in 1895. Whilst in Jamaica, Duerden studied the local caves, marine resources, anthropological findings, and madreporarian corals, publishing a monograph on the latter in 1901. At this point, Duerden was best known for his work on corals. Duerden remained in contact with colleagues in Dublin, sending geological material to Grenville Cole.

Duerden moved to the University of North Carolina, taking up the position of Acting Professor of Biology from 1902 to 1903, filling in for Professor Henry Van Peters Wilson. Whilst there, Duerden taught a variety of subjects, including general biology, mammalian anatomy, vertebrate histology, zoology, and vertebrate embryology, and was a member of the Elisha Mitchell Scientific Society. During his time in the United States, Duerden published at least 15 papers on the morphology and biology of corals between 1902 and 1906. Between 1903 and 1905, he was the Acting Assistant Professor or Instructor of Zoology at the University of Michigan and an Honorary Curator at the American Museum of Natural History. He conducted an expedition to Hawaii to study Pacific corals, funded by the Carnegie Institution for Science.

He moved to South Africa in 1904 to take up the role of Professor of Zoology at Rhodes University. He was the first person to hold this position, and for a number of years he was the only member of staff. Whilst there, he studied ostriches, focusing on their feathers, producing a number of papers on the subject in 1909 and 1913. The ostrich feather industry collapsed due to World War I, so Duerden's academic focus turned to wool. In this work he was associated with the Grootfontein College of Agriculture and the Onderstepoort Veterinary Academic Hospital. Having built up a research team, Duerden became a leading authority on wool, leading to his appointment as the Director of Wool Research at the Department of Agriculture. He devised the Duerden Crimp Scale in 1927, for use by the wool industry. Duerden was elected as the President of the South African Association for the Advancement of Science in 1921. Duerden spoke and published on eugenics whilst in this position.

== Later life and legacy ==
Duerden retired from Rhodes University in 1932, though continued to work with the Grootfontein Agricultural College. This college has an annual prize named in his honour, the Duerden Shield, for a student working in the area of sheep, goats and wool. Duerden returned in England, where he worked for the Wool Industries Research Association at Headingley, Leeds, and was appointed an Honorary Fellow of the University of Leeds. He died in Leeds on 4 September 1937.

== Eponymous species ==
- Homostichanthus duerdeni Carlgren, 1900.
- Pavona duerdeni Vaughan, 1907.
- Atractaspis duerdeni Gough, 1907.
