= Endothelin 2 =

Protein found in humans

EDN2

Identifiers
- Aliases: EDN2, ET2, PPET2, ET-2, endothelin 2
- External IDs: OMIM: 131241; MGI: 95284; GeneCards: EDN2

Gene location (Human)
| Chr. | Chromosome 1 (human) |
| Band | 1p34.2 | Start | 41,478,775 bp |
| Band | 1p34.2 | End | 41,484,683 bp |

Gene location (Mouse)
| Chr. | Chromosome 4 (mouse) |
| Band | 4|4 D2.1 | Start | 120,018,403 bp |
| Band | 4|4 D2.1 | End | 120,024,557 bp |
RNA expression pattern
| Bgee | Human / Mouse (ortholog); Top expressed in: testicle; buccal mucosa cell; olfactory zone of nasal mucosa; skin of abdomen; vagina; mucosa of transverse colon; skin of leg; right uterine tube; minor salivary glands; trachea / Top expressed in: morula; embryo; blastocyst; decidua; jejunum; ileum; duodenum; lip; left colon; intestinal villus; More reference expression data |
| BioGPS | n/a |
Gene ontology
| Molecular function | hormone activity; endothelin B receptor binding |
| Cellular component | extracellular region; intracellular anatomical structure; extracellular space |
| Biological process | positive regulation of prostaglandin-endoperoxide synthase activity; hormonal regulation of the force of heart contraction; regulation of systemic arterial blood pressure by endothelin; vasoconstriction; cytokine-mediated signaling pathway; positive regulation of cytosolic calcium ion concentration; neutrophil chemotaxis; positive regulation of heart rate; positive regulation of leukocyte chemotaxis; cell surface receptor signaling pathway; vein smooth muscle contraction; macrophage chemotaxis; regulation of vasoconstriction; positive regulation of cell population proliferation; artery smooth muscle contraction; energy homeostasis; macrophage activation; prostaglandin biosynthetic process; lung alveolus development; temperature homeostasis; positive regulation of the force of heart contraction by chemical signal; inositol phosphate-mediated signaling; positive regulation of smooth muscle contraction; calcium-mediated signaling; regulation of signaling receptor activity; G protein-coupled receptor signaling pathway |
Sources:Amigo / QuickGO
Orthologs
| Databases | NCBI: entry; OMA: entry |
| Species | Human | Mouse |
| Entrez | 1907 | 13615 |
| Ensembl | ENSG00000127129 | ENSMUSG00000028635 |
| UniProt | P20800 | P22389 |
| RefSeq (mRNA) | NM_001956; NM_001302269 | NM_007902 |
| RefSeq (protein) | NP_001289198; NP_001947 | NP_031928 |
| Location (UCSC) | Chr 1: 41.48 – 41.48 Mb | Chr 4: 120.02 – 120.02 Mb |
| PubMed search |
- Wikidata
| View/Edit Human | View/Edit Mouse |

Endothelin 2 (ET-2) is a protein encoded by the EDN2 gene in humans. It was first discovered in 1988 by Yanagisawa and team and belongs to a family of three endothelin peptide isoforms (ET-1, ET-2, ET-3), which constrict blood vessels. ET-2 is encoded by genes on separate chromosomes to its isoforms and is mainly produced in vascular endothelial cells of the kidney, placenta, uterus, heart, central nervous system and intestine. It becomes present in the blood of animals and humans at levels ranging from 0.3pg/ml to 3pg/ml. ET-2 acts by binding to two different G-protein coupled receptors (GPCRs), the endothelin A receptor (EDNRA) and the endothelin B receptor (EDNRB).

== Function ==
As ET-2 has a very similar homology to ET-1, differing only in two amino acids (with Trp6 and Leu7 instead of Leu6 and Met7) it was often assumed that the two endothelins were similar in synthetic pathway and mechanism of action. As ET-1 is abundant in the body while ET-2 is almost undetectable, ET-1 was more convenient to research, this assumption has meant ET-2 is relatively under-researched. Equally, limited studies have been conducted using VIC, a vasoactive intestinal peptide and the peptide equivalent to ET-2 in mice.

However, further research evidence suggested distinct roles and features of ET-2. Unlike the other endothelins, ET-2 knockout mice (with the EDN2 gene globally removed from their genetic code) are retarded in growth, hypoglycemic, hypothermic and have ketonemia, resulting in early mortality. These differences between ET-1 and ET-2 may be attributed to differing gene expression and the synthesis of different peptides by endothelin converting enzymes (ECEs).

ET-2 is a potent vasoconstrictor and has been implicated in ovarian physiology, as well as diseases relating to the heart, immunology, and cancers.

== Clinical significance ==
=== Ovarian follicle rupture ===
Ovulation occurs at around day 14 of the human menstrual cycle and refers to the release of an egg, characterised by the rupture of a preovulatory ovarian follicle. This process is driven changes in oestrogen-regulated feedback on the hypothalamic–pituitary–gonadal axis, leading to a surge of luteinizing hormone which drives follicular rupture. There is a complex molecular dialogue for ovulation which involves the coordinated expression of many key proteins, including ET-2.

Within the follicle, ET-2 expression is confined to a group of steroid-producing stromal cells called granulosa cells, where its production peaks transiently at the final stages before ovulation (periovulatory stage). In the mouse, there is a surge of ET-2 around two hours prior to ovulation, this is thought to act as one of the driving forces for follicular rupture. Much of our current understanding of ET-2 and its role during ovulation comes from rodent model experiments. However, there are some interspecies discrepancies, with stark differences identified between the mouse and bovine ovary.

The mechanisms underlying ET-2-induced follicle rupture are debated, with most theories suggesting a mechanical contraction pathway. ET-2 is believed to act on the follicle by binding to and stimulating EDNRA, which is expressed constitutively on the external layer of theca cells (another type of steroid-producing stromal cell). This causes smooth muscle cells surrounding the ovary to contract. This smooth muscle layer encapsulates the ovary but is absent at the site where the oocyte is expelled, creating a region of low surface tension which weakens the follicle wall and promotes the release of an egg.

ET-2 also binds to and activates EDNRB, which is constitutively expressed by granulosa cells and theca interna. There is controversy surrounding the role of ET-2 signalling at this receptor. Some studies suggest that EDNRB activation by ET-2 regulates follicular rupture by antagonising effects of EDNRA stimulation. Alternatively, EDNRB may propel follicular rupture by inducing nitric oxide signalling. This results in local vasodilation, contributing to the rise in follicular fluid pressure seen in the periovulatory phase.

=== Cardiovascular system ===
ET-2, like ET-1, has a role in modulating vascular tone. This can have implications for blood pressure control. A specific EDN2 gene polymorphism has been correlated with essential hypertension and alternative studies have shown associations between certain rare ET-2 polymorphisms and lower diastolic blood pressures. The ET-2 gene has been shown to co-segregate with blood pressure in rodent studies; a potential reason for the link.

However, transgenic rats expressing the human ET-2 gene under the control of the human endothelin promotor are normotensive (blood pressure in normal range), despite these studies suggesting that overexpression of ET-2 results in glomerulosclerosis. This suggests that further investigation into the role of ET-2 in blood pressure is warranted.

As a strong positive inotrope, endothelin-2 has an impact on the human myocardium and for this reason, endothelin-2 antagonists have been shown to improve exercise tolerance and inhibit clinical deterioration in pulmonary hypertension. ET-2 demonstrates a positive chronotropic and proarrhythmic effects. A study showed a significant association of a specific polymorphism of the EDN2 gene with increased incidence of atrial fibrillation in patients with hypertrophic cardiomyopathy. Overall, the evidence suggests that ET-2 could modulate vascular tone, tissue morphology and remodelling.

=== Breast tumour cell invasion ===
Since reports of increased ET-2 expression in human breast cancer (2002), there has been growing interest in ET-2 within cancer pathogenesis. There is increased expression of the 'endothelin axis' consisting of 21 amino acid peptides (ET-1, ET-2 and ET-3), two GPCRs and two activating peptidases in invasive breast cancer. This increased expression is not seen in non-invasive tissue. This is further supported by observations from patient biopsies, endothelin expression is associated specifically with regions of the tumour that are invasive and is more common in whole tumours with lymphovascular invasion (i.e. the invasion of cancer cells into the lymphatic system).

In vitro, when breast tumour cell lines with endothelins are stimulated, the phenotype becomes invasive. Invasion through an artificial membrane can be stimulated, particularly when co-cultured in the presence of macrophages. The association between endothelins, poor prognosis and invasion suggests the endothelin axis is an interesting therapeutic target for the treatment of invasive breast cancer.

The breast tumour microenvironment is particularly hypoxic which allows it to modulate the expression of numerous 'pro-tumour' genes including endothelins. This hypoxic environment can be replicated in vitro, resulting in increased expression of ET-2 by breast tumour cells. This increased ET-2 expression provides the tumour with autocrine protection from hypoxia-associated apoptosis allowing growth of the tumour. Further research using mice with breast tumours in hypoxic conditions showed that the addition of ET-2 increased the survival of tumour cells suggesting the upregulation of ET-2 in hypoxic tumours may explain the increased invasive potential and worse prognosis than their well oxygenated counterparts.
