= Endothelin-converting enzyme 1 =

Identifiers
- EC no.: 3.4.24.71
- CAS no.: 138238-81-0

Databases
- IntEnz: IntEnz view
- BRENDA: BRENDA entry
- ExPASy: NiceZyme view
- KEGG: KEGG entry
- MetaCyc: metabolic pathway
- PRIAM: profile
- PDB structures: RCSB PDB PDBe PDBsum
Search
- PMC: articles
- PubMed: articles
- NCBI: proteins

Endothelin-converting enzyme 1 (EC 3.4.24.71, endothelin-converting enzyme, ECE-1) is an enzyme. This enzyme catalyses the following chemical reaction

Hydrolysis of the -Trp^{21}-Val- bond in big endothelin to form endothelin 1

This metalloendopeptidase belongs to the peptidase family M13.
