= Harald Hirschsprung =

Danish physician (1830–1916)

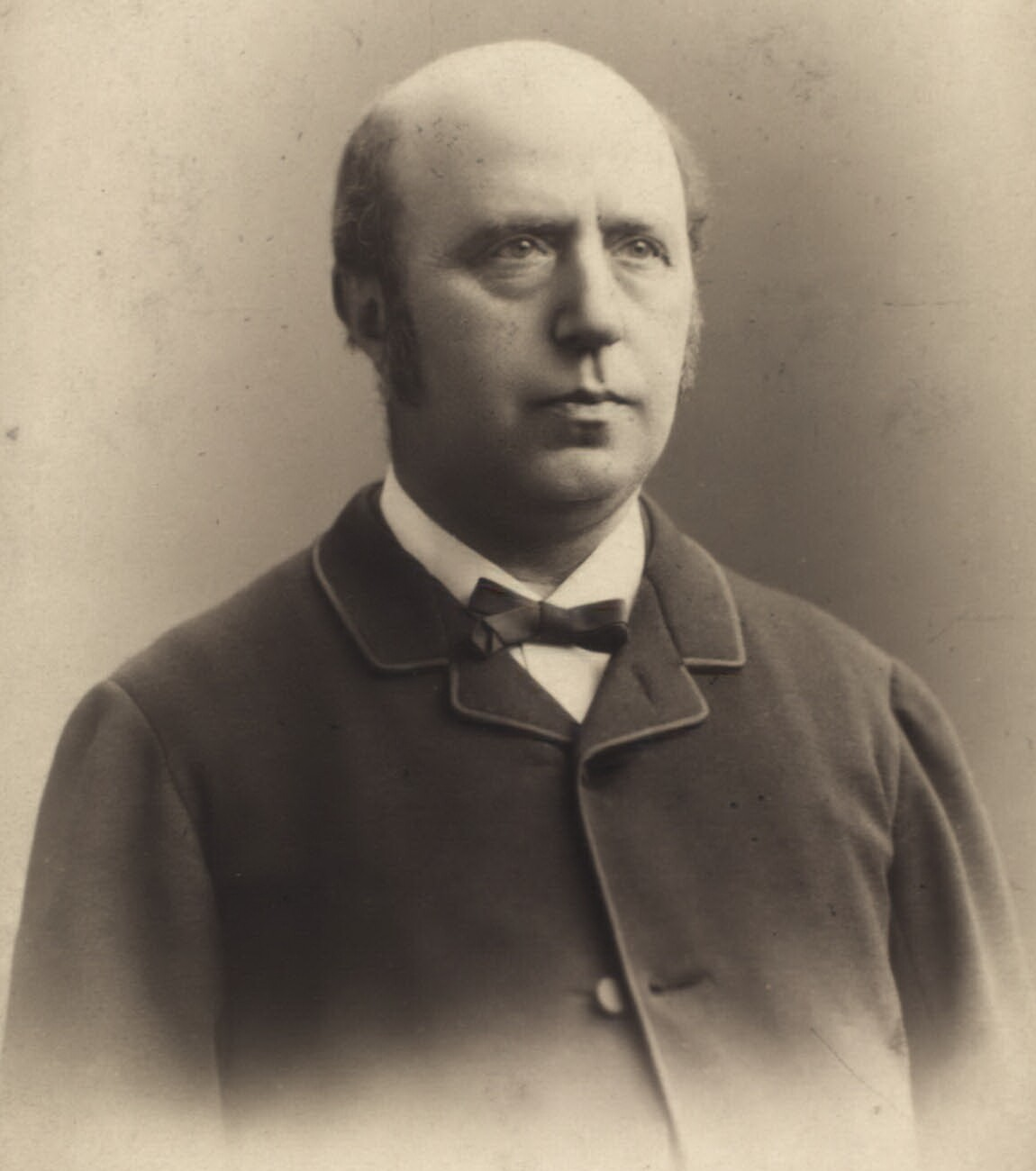
- Born: 14 December 1830; Copenhagen
- Died: 11 April 1916 (aged 85); Copenhagen
- Citizenship: Denmark
- Known for: Hirschsprung's disease
- Medical career
- Profession: Doctor
- Field: Physician
- Institutions: University of Copenhagen, Queen Louise's Children's Hospital

Harald Hirschsprung (14 December 1830, Copenhagen – 11 April 1916, Copenhagen) was a Danish physician who first described Hirschsprung's disease in 1886.

== Life and medical career ==
Harald Hirschsprung was a native of Copenhagen, born to Jewish parents. Hirschsprung chose to become a doctor instead of joining his father's tobacco factory, A.M. Hirschsprung & Sønner. He passed his acceptance exam for university in 1848 and passed the Staatsexamen in 1855. He was interested in rare diseases affecting the gut throughout his life, and one such, atresia of the oesophagus and small bowel, was the subject of his doctoral thesis, presented in May 1861.

He became the first Danish pediatrician in 1870, when he was appointed to a hospital for neonates. In 1879, he was made the chief physician at Queen Louise's Children's Hospital, which opened in 1879. He was appointed a professor of pediatrics in 1891. Hirschsprung taught small classes on Sunday mornings between 9 and 11, to ensure that only truly dedicated students would come. He was not a great teacher, however, having problems with public speaking and a penchant for focusing on rare cases rather than those most beneficial to general practice.

Hirschsprung offered free health care for poor children while continuing to require patients with more means to pay. He also went against the wishes of the queen, the hospital's namesake, in his insistence that pictures of animals, rather than biblical texts, be placed above each child's bed.

In 1904, when he was 74 years old, Hirschsprung was forced to resign from his practice. He continued his study of what would later come to be called Hirschsprung's disease until his poor health prevented him, and lived out his retirement in his country house in Øresund. He was buried in the Jewish section of Vestre Cemetery.

== Hirschsprung's disease ==
Hirschsprung published on many areas of pediatrics, including pyloric stenosis, intussusception, rickets, and rheumatic nodules, but he is most well known for his work on the disease that later came to bear his name.

At the congress of the Congress for Children's Diseases (Gesellschaft für Kinderheilkunde) in Berlin, Hirschsprung gave a lecture about what would become "his" disease. It was titled "Stuhlträgheit Neugeborener in Folge von Dilatation und Hypertrophie des Colons" and was published one year later. He spoke of two infants who had died from the disease, constipation associated with dilatation and hypertrophy of the colon, and near the end of his lecture said that: "it appears unquestionable that the condition is caused in utero, either as a developmental abnormality or as a disease process". He published an account of the disease, which he believed to be a new condition, two years later.

Although he was the first to describe the condition, he erroneously believed the proximal, dilated bowel to be diseased. We now know that the diseased segment of intestine is the distal portion (down to the rectum), which lacks ganglion cells and can therefore not relax. This contracted state (sometimes called rectal achalasia) prevents the passage of stools and causes intestinal obstruction and constipation.
