= Goldberg–Shprintzen syndrome =

- Other names: Goldberg-Shprintzen megacolon syndrome
- Goldberg–Shprintzen syndrome is inherited in an autosomal recessive manner

Goldberg–Shprintzen syndrome is a very rare connective tissue condition associated with mutations in KIAA1279 gene which encodes KIF-binding protein (KBP), a protein that may interact with microtubules and actin filaments. KBP may play a key role in cytoskeleton formation and neurite growth.

Hirschsprung's disease may be part of the presentation. Developmental abnormalities shown by people with Goldberg–Shprintzen syndrome may be ocular, cardiac, urogenital, and skeletal.

It was first observed by Sugarman and Vogel in 1981 and later established as a separate clinical identity by R B Goldberg and R J Shprintzen in 1982. The sibling pair had microcephaly, hypertelorism, short stature, submucosal cleft palate, learning problems, and Hirschsprung aganglionic megacolon (HAM). This combination of symptoms had not been previously identified with a diagnosis.

Three more cases were observed in 1988 by Hurst et al., although one of these cases could have been Mowat-Wilson syndrome instead of Goldberg–Shprintzen syndrome. Additional cases have since been documented sporadically across the world, although it remains extremely uncommon.

== Signs and symptoms ==
Goldberg–Shprintzen syndrome presents a wide variety of phenotypic symptoms. It is characterized by a combination of any of the following symptoms:

Central nervous system:

- Intellectual disability
- Microcephaly
- Gyral anomalies of the brain (indicative of defects in migration of neural crest cells and neurons)
- Abnormal EEG
- Hypoplasia of the corpus callosum and cerebellum
- Enlargement of the subarachnoid space

Cardiovascular:

- Progressive aortic root dilation
- Mitral valve prolapse
- Mitral regurgitation

Gastrointestinal:

- Hirschsprung's disease
- Constipation

Optical:

- Megalocornea
- Pale optic discs with poor fixation

Dysmorphic facial features:

- Hypertelorism
- Submucous cleft palate
- Sloping forehead
- Sparse eyebrows
- Depressed nasal bridge
- Bulbous nose
- Full lips
- Sparse hair
- Arched eyebrows
- Long eyelashes
- Ptosis
- Downslanting palpebral fissures
- Prominent ears
- Thick earlobes
- Prominent nasal bridge
- Thick philtrum
- Everted lower lip
- Pointed chin

Anatomical abnormalities:

- Camptodactyly and clinodactyly of the second to fourth toes
- Hypotonia

Additionally, while inconsistent, the following symptoms have been observed:

- Congenital heart disease
- Oligodontia
- Scoliosis

== Diagnosis ==
Diagnosis is initiated by presentation of clinical features and confirmed by genetic testing. Symptoms can often be observed prenatally. Prenatal diagnosis is often used in families with a history of Goldberg–Shprintzen syndrome, as it is much more likely to occur. In particular, polymicrogyria, microcephaly, and hypoplastic corpus callosum have been suggested as key clinical indicators of Goldberg–Shprintzen syndrome.

There are numerous genetic tests available for Goldberg–Shprintzen syndrome. While some are only limited to testing for Goldberg–Shprintzen syndrome, a number of these genetic tests also test for Marfan syndrome and other syndromes closely related to Goldberg–Shprintzen syndrome. Others test for cleft lip/cleft palate, connective tissue disorders, or other symptoms that can be indicative of Goldberg–Shprintzen syndrome.

== Management or treatment ==
Although Goldberg-Shprintzen syndrome cannot be cured, some of its symptoms can be managed. Cardiovascular complications present the greatest mortality risk to individuals with Goldberg-Shprintzen syndrome, so these are the priority for care and necessitate a cardiologist. Some cardiovascular conditions can only be monitored, while others can be treated with surgical intervention. Surgery can also be used to correct facial deformities, although surgery should be undertaken with great care to prevent the incidence of cardiac complications. Additionally, treatment by an ophthalmologist is also often necessary due to the high incidence of optical conditions associated with Goldberg-Shprintzen syndrome. Special education or support should also be provided to individuals affected by intellectual disability.

== Genetics ==
Goldberg-Shprintzen syndrome shows autosomal recessive inheritance patterns. The subjects studied for this disease included families which were highly consanguineous or inbred. Mutations of the KIAA1279 gene were determined as a possible driving mutation causing the syndrome, and researchers found that the coding errors were caused by homozygous nonsense mutations or other homozygous truncating mutations. The chromosomal location of the suspected gene associated with Goldberg-Shprintzen syndrome is located at a locus on 10q21.3-q22.1, which begins at the 21st position on the long arm of chromosome 10, although the determination of a definitively causative genetic mutation has not been agreed upon. The changes in the KIAA1279 gene are expected to cause problems in nervous system development due to a loss of functioning protein product. This is shown by the KIAA1279 gene's connection to both Hirschsprung's disease and bilateral generalized polymicrogyria, characteristics of Goldberg-Shprintzen syndrome.

== Epidemiology ==
The prevalence of Goldberg-Shprintzen syndrome is scattered throughout the world, with cases recorded in France, Pakistan, Italy, Iraq, and multiple in Morocco. While it has appeared in a non-consanguineous family in one case, most cases present within consanguineous pedigrees which preserves the mutant allele that causes Goldberg–Shprintzen syndrome. Every case of Goldberg–Shprintzen syndrome is associated with a mutation in the same KIAA1279 gene.
