= Meredith Wilson =

Meredith Wilson or Meredith Willson may refer to:

- Robert Meredith Willson (1902–1984), American flutist, composer, conductor, musical arranger, bandleader, playwright and author, best known for The Music Man
- O. Meredith Wilson (1909–1998), American historian and academic administrator
- Meredith J. Wilson, co-discoverer in 1988 of Mowat-Wilson syndrome
