= Endothelin converting enzyme 1 =

Mammalian protein found in humans

ECE1
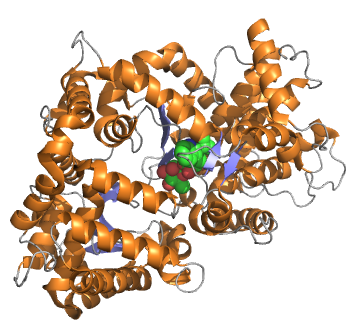

Identifiers
- Aliases: ECE1, ECE, endothelin converting enzyme 1
- External IDs: OMIM: 600423; MGI: 1101357; GeneCards: ECE1
Available structures
PDB	Ortholog search: PDBe RCSB
PDB	List of PDB id codes 3DWB
Enzyme activity
EC #	BRENDA	ExPASy	KEGG	MetaCyc
3.4.24.71	↗	↗	↗	↗

Gene location (Human)
Chr.	Chromosome 1 (human)
Band	1p36.12	Start	21,217,247 bp
Band	1p36.12	End	21,345,572 bp

Gene location (Mouse)
Chr.	Chromosome 4 (mouse)
Band	4|4 D3	Start	137,589,548 bp
Band	4|4 D3	End	137,692,540 bp
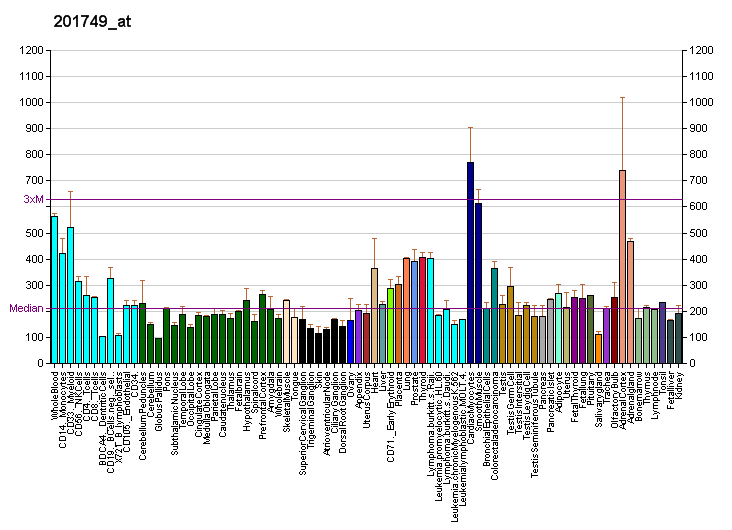

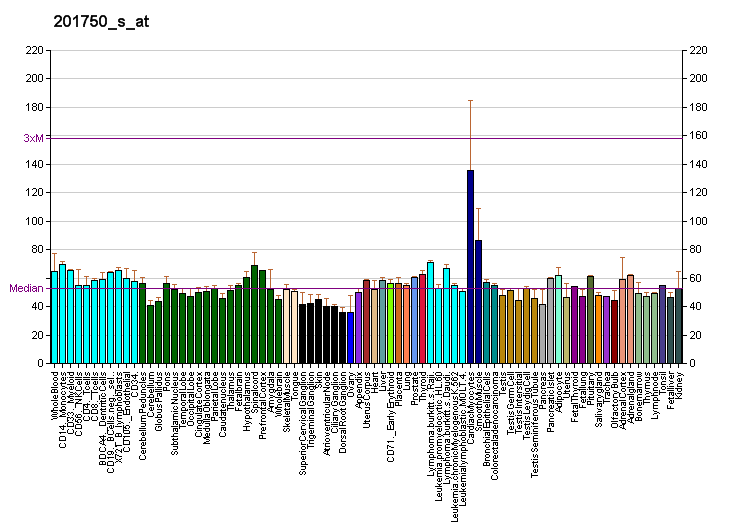
RNA expression pattern
Bgee	Human / Mouse (ortholog); Top expressed in: stromal cell of endometrium; left adrenal cortex; right adrenal gland; popliteal artery; tibial arteries; right adrenal cortex; right lung; right coronary artery; gastric mucosa; canal of the cervix / Top expressed in: aortic valve; right lung lobe; endothelial cell of lymphatic vessel; ascending aorta; islet of Langerhans; gastrula; lip; pituitary gland; internal carotid artery; external carotid artery; More reference expression data
BioGPS	More reference expression data
Gene ontology
Molecular function	endopeptidase activity; metal ion binding; peptide hormone binding; peptidase activity; protein binding; hydrolase activity; metallopeptidase activity; protein homodimerization activity; metalloendopeptidase activity; zinc ion binding
Cellular component	Weibel-Palade body; integral component of membrane; vesicle; endosome; membrane; lysosomal membrane; intrinsic component of endosome membrane; perinuclear region of cytoplasm; extracellular exosome; external side of plasma membrane; early endosome; plasma membrane
Biological process	endothelin maturation; bradykinin catabolic process; regulation of systemic arterial blood pressure by endothelin; embryonic digit morphogenesis; ear development; hormone catabolic process; proteolysis; development of the heart; calcitonin catabolic process; regulation of vasoconstriction; substance P catabolic process; pharyngeal system development; positive regulation of receptor recycling; protein processing; peptide hormone processing
Sources:Amigo / QuickGO
Orthologs
Databases	NCBI: entry; OMA: entry
Species	Human	Mouse
Entrez	1889	230857
Ensembl	ENSG00000117298	ENSMUSG00000057530
UniProt	P42892	Q4PZA2
RefSeq (mRNA)	NM_001113347; NM_001113348; NM_001113349; NM_001397	NM_199307; NM_001369177; NM_001369178; NM_001369179
RefSeq (protein)	NP_001106818; NP_001106819; NP_001106820; NP_001388; NP_001106820.1	NP_955011; NP_001356106; NP_001356107; NP_001356108
Location (UCSC)	Chr 1: 21.22 – 21.35 Mb	Chr 4: 137.59 – 137.69 Mb
PubMed search
- Wikidata
View/Edit Human	View/Edit Mouse

Endothelin converting enzyme 1, also known as ECE1, is an enzyme which in humans is encoded by the ECE1 gene. It is inhibited by phosphoramidon. ECE1 also mediates melanin production through breaking down inactive Big-EDN1 to produce an active EDN1 in keratinocytes and endothelial cells.

== Function ==
Endothelin-converting enzyme-1 is involved in the proteolytic processing of endothelin-1 (EDN1), -2 (EDN2), and -3 (EDN3) to biologically active peptides.
