= Intestinal neuronal dysplasia =

- Other names: Neuronal intestinal dysplasia (NID)
- Specialty: Gastroenterology
- Symptoms: chronic constipation, hard and bulky stools, low frequency of bowel movement, rectal bleeding, encopresis which means stool overflow incontinence, straining during defecation
- Causes: inherited
- Diagnostic method: barium enema and anorectal manometry are negative (ddx of Hirschprug disease), colonoscopy with biopsy: hyperplasia of submucosal myenteric plexus and increase acetylcholinesterase activity
- Treatment: surgery (posterior myectomy and colonic resection)
- Medication: Laxatives, dietary changes

Intestinal neuronal dysplasia (IND) is an inherited disease of the intestine that affects one in 3000 children and adults. The intestine uses peristalsis to push its contents toward the anus; people with IND have a problem with the motor neurons that lead to the intestine, inhibiting this process and thus preventing digestion.

It can often be confused for Hirschsprung's disease, as both have similar symptoms.

== Presentation ==
IND can be grouped into NID A and NID B, with the "A" form affecting the sympathetic innervation, and the "B" version affecting the parasympathetic innervation. In 2002 Martucciello and colleagues published the first analysis of associated anomalies in the IND population, representing an important clinical approach to investigate possible pathogenetic correlations. Two recessive syndromes were identified (3 families). The first was characterized by NID B, intestinal malrotation, and congenital short bowel, the second by NID B, short stature, intellectual disability, and facial dysmorphism. In this study, gastrointestinal anomalies accounted for 67.4% of all associated disorders. These data suggest a strong correlation between IND and intestinal development.

== Treatment ==
Conservative treatment involves the long term use of laxatives and enemas, and has limited success. Dietary changes in order to control the disease are ineffective and high fiber diets often worsen the symptoms in children. As a last resort, surgical treatment (internal sphincter myectomy or colon resection) is used.
