= KIF-binding protein =

Protein-coding gene in the species Homo sapiens

KIFBP

Identifiers
- Aliases: KIFBP, KBP, KIAA1279, TTC20, KIF1 binding protein, kinesin family binding protein, KIF1BP
- External IDs: OMIM: 609367; MGI: 1919570; GeneCards: KIFBP

Gene location (Human)
Chr.	Chromosome 10 (human)
Band	10q22.1	Start	68,988,803 bp
Band	10q22.1	End	69,043,544 bp

Gene location (Mouse)
Chr.	Chromosome 10 (mouse)
Band	10|10 B4	Start	62,374,405 bp
Band	10|10 B4	End	62,414,236 bp
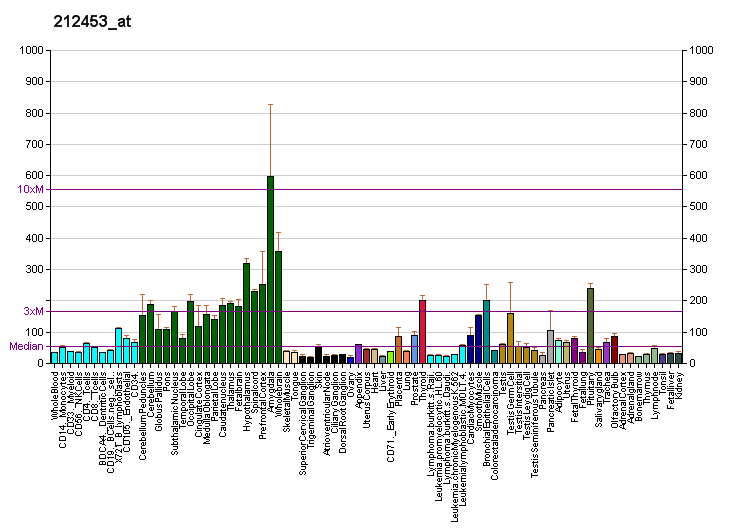
RNA expression pattern
Bgee	Human / Mouse (ortholog); Top expressed in: frontal pole; ventricular zone; secondary oocyte; paraflocculus of cerebellum; right ventricle; middle frontal gyrus; prefrontal cortex; gonad; ganglionic eminence; Brodmann area 9 / Top expressed in: temporal lobe; amygdala; olfactory epithelium; Region I of hippocampus proper; prefrontal cortex; anterior horn of spinal cord; hippocampus proper; facial motor nucleus; nucleus accumbens; Epithelium of choroid plexus; More reference expression data
BioGPS	More reference expression data
Gene ontology
Molecular function	protein binding; kinesin binding
Cellular component	cytoplasm; cytoskeleton; mitochondrion
Biological process	multicellular organism development; cell differentiation; mitochondrial transport; nervous system development
Sources:Amigo / QuickGO
Orthologs
Databases	NCBI: entry; OMA: entry
Species	Human	Mouse
Entrez	26128	72320
Ensembl	ENSG00000198954	ENSMUSG00000036955
UniProt	Q96EK5	Q6ZPU9
RefSeq (mRNA)	NM_015634	NM_028197
RefSeq (protein)	NP_056449	NP_082473
Location (UCSC)	Chr 10: 68.99 – 69.04 Mb	Chr 10: 62.37 – 62.41 Mb
PubMed search
- Wikidata
View/Edit Human	View/Edit Mouse

KIF-binding protein, also known as Kinesin binding protein (KBP), is a protein that in humans is encoded by the KIFBP gene (previously KIAA1279). The interaction of KBP with Kif15 is necessary for the localization of Kif15 to the microtubule plus-end at the spindle equator. Interaction between Kif15 and KBP is essential for the perfect alignment of chromosomes at the metaphase plate, and any defect in their interaction leads to delay in chromosomal alignment during mitosis. Anything that perturb the interaction of KBP and Kif15 can block the cells at mitosis, and hence it can be therapeutically used to control Kif15 upregulated cancer cells.

== Clinical significance ==
Defects may be associated with Goldberg–Shprintzen syndrome (OMIM 609460).

== Interactions ==
KIAA1279 has been shown to interact with Retinal G protein coupled receptor and Dipeptidase 1.
