= Hirschsprung's disease-type D brachydactyly syndrome =

Hirschsprung's disease-brachydactyly type D syndrome
- Other names: Familial Hirschsprung's disease and brachydactyly type D
- Specialty: Medical genetics
- Symptoms: hirschsprung's disease and brachydactyly type D
- Causes: Genetic mutation
- Prevention: none
- Frequency: Hirschsprung's disease: 1 in 5,000 live births., brachydactyly type D: 3% of the world population

Hirschsprung's disease-type D brachydactyly syndrome is a very rare genetic disorder which is characterized by the partial absence of nerves in the intestines (Hirschsprung's disease) and hypoplasia (or total aplasia) of the thumb's distal phalange (brachydactyly type D). It has been described in 4 males from a 2-generation American family. The inheritance pattern was hypothesized to be either X-linked recessive or autosomal dominant with reduced penetrance.
