= Orvar Swenson =

American pediatric surgeon (1909–2012)

- Born: 7 February 1909; Helsingborg, Sweden
- Died: 13 April 2012 (aged 103)
- Education: William Chrisman High School; William Jewell College; Harvard Medical School
- Known for: Swenson pull-through procedure for Hirschsprung's disease
- Medical career
- Institutions: Boston Children's Hospital; Peter Bent Brigham Hospital; Children's Memorial Hospital

Orvar Swenson (7 February 1909 – 13 April 2012) was a Swedish-born American pediatric surgeon. He discovered the cause of Hirschsprung's disease and in 1948, with Alexander Bill, performed the first pull-through operation in a child with megacolon, which then became a treatment for the disease.

Initially a resident in pathology, he soon became an assistant professor of pediatric surgery at Harvard and later moved to Boston's Floating Hospital for Children as surgeon-in-chief, where he was the first pediatric surgeon on the staff at the hospital and where he began his research in Hirschsprung's disease. Subsequently, he became surgeon-in-chief of Children's Memorial Hospital, where he remained until his retirement in 1973.

In 1973, Swenson was elected president of the American Pediatric Surgical Association. He authored Swenson's Pediatric Surgery, which ran into five editions and he was the recipient of a number of awards including the E. Mead Johnson Award, the William E. Ladd Medal and the Denis Browne Gold Medal.

== Early life ==
Swenson was born in Helsingborg, Sweden, in 1909. His parents, Amanda and Carl Albert Swenson, were missionaries for the Community of Christ and relocated their family to Independence, Missouri, in 1917. Both parents died when Orvar was a teenager, and he and his brother Alvin lived in a boarding house where they started a business, Woodcraft, which sold fire-by-friction sets, bows and arrows, and field hockey sticks. Orvar graduated from William Chrisman High School in 1929 and William Jewell College in 1933. The same year, Orvar and Alvin were admitted to Harvard Medical School, where they successfully petitioned the dean to be placed in the same class so that they could share textbooks in order to save money. They graduated from Harvard in 1937.

== Career ==
Swenson began his medical career as an intern at Ohio State University. After a year, he returned to Boston to work at Boston Children's Hospital and Peter Bent Brigham Hospital. Initially a resident in pathology, he took a residency in surgery from 1939 to 1945, after which he became an assistant professor of pediatric surgery at Harvard while working on the pediatric surgical staff at Boston Children's Hospital. In 1949 he moved to Boston's Floating Hospital for Children as surgeon-in-chief, making him the first pediatric surgeon on the staff at the hospital. Subsequently, he moved to Chicago in 1960 to become the surgeon-in-chief of Children's Memorial Hospital, where he remained until his retirement in 1973. After his retirement from clinical practice, he moved to Miami and taught at the University of Miami until 1980.

=== Hirschsprung's disease ===
Swenson's main contributions to pediatric surgery focused on Hirschsprung's disease, a congenital disease in which nerves are absent from part of the colon, causing constipation and megacolon (abnormal dilation of the colon). He began his research on the condition while he was a surgical resident in Boston. He discovered that the disease was caused by an absence of ganglion cells in the rectum, but before clarity on the cause of the disease, with Alexander Bill, they designed a surgical procedure to remove the abnormal section of the bowel, pull-through the normal bowel and join it to the remaining parts of the normal bowel.

When Swenson performed the procedure in 1948, it was the first successful surgical correction of megacolon. It was not however a real Hirschsprung's, as Swenson clarified later in an interview when Bill had said to him that "this is just a weird case; it's not a real Hirschsprung's disease".

This operation, however, became the only procedure that treated Hirschsprung's disease and became known as the "Swenson pull-through". He described the hallmark clinical and radiological markers of Hirschsprung's disease in newborns and showed that the only way to make a definitive diagnosis was to perform a full-thickness rectal biopsy. Swenson subsequently followed his patients for a number of years. Over his career, he traveled to India, Australia, South America, Europe and Canada to demonstrate his procedure.

=== Other surgical work ===
As well as Hirschsprung's disease, Swenson worked on the treatment of other birth defects. He performed esophageal anastomoses for esophageal atresia and tracheoesophageal fistula, and resection and anastomosis in intestinal atresia. He was among the first to advocate performing a pelvic osteotomy when treating bladder exstrophy and for partial nephrectomy in bilateral Wilms' tumors.

== Awards and honors ==
He served as president of the American Pediatric Surgical Association in 1973–1974, and was the author of Swenson's Pediatric Surgery, a textbook that was published in five editions from 1958 to 1990. He received the E. Mead Johnson Award from the Society for Pediatric Research in 1952, the William E. Ladd Medal from the American Academy of Pediatrics in 1959, and the Denis Browne Gold Medal from the British Association of Paediatric Surgeons in 1979.

== Personal life ==
Swenson married Melva Elizabeth Criley in 1941; they had three daughters. He died in Charleston, South Carolina, in 2012, aged 103.

== Selected publications ==
- Swenson, O; Bill, AH Jr (1948). "Resection of rectum and rectosigmoid with preservation of the sphincter for benign spastic lesions producing megacolon; an experimental study". Surgery. 24 (2): 212–20. PMID 18872852.
- Swenson, O; Neuhauser, EB; Pickett, LK (1949). "New concepts of the etiology, diagnosis and treatment of congenital megacolon (Hirschsprung's disease)". Pediatrics. 4 (2): 201–9. doi:10.1542/peds.4.2.201. PMID 18137843. S2CID 1265978.
- Swenson, O (1950). "A new surgical treatment for Hirschsprung's disease". Surgery. 28 (2): 371–83. PMID 15442813.
- Swenson, Orvar; Segnitz, Richard H.; Shedd, Robert H. (1951). "Hirschsprung's disease". The American Journal of Surgery. 81 (3): 341–347. doi:10.1016/0002-9610(51)90239-5. PMID 14819481.
- Swenson, O (August 1989). "My early experience with Hirschsprung's disease". J. Pediatr. Surg. 24 (8): 839–44, discussion 844–5. doi:10.1016/s0022-3468(89)80549-4. PMID 2671336.
