= Dipeptidase 1 =

Protein-coding gene in the species Homo sapiens

DPEP1
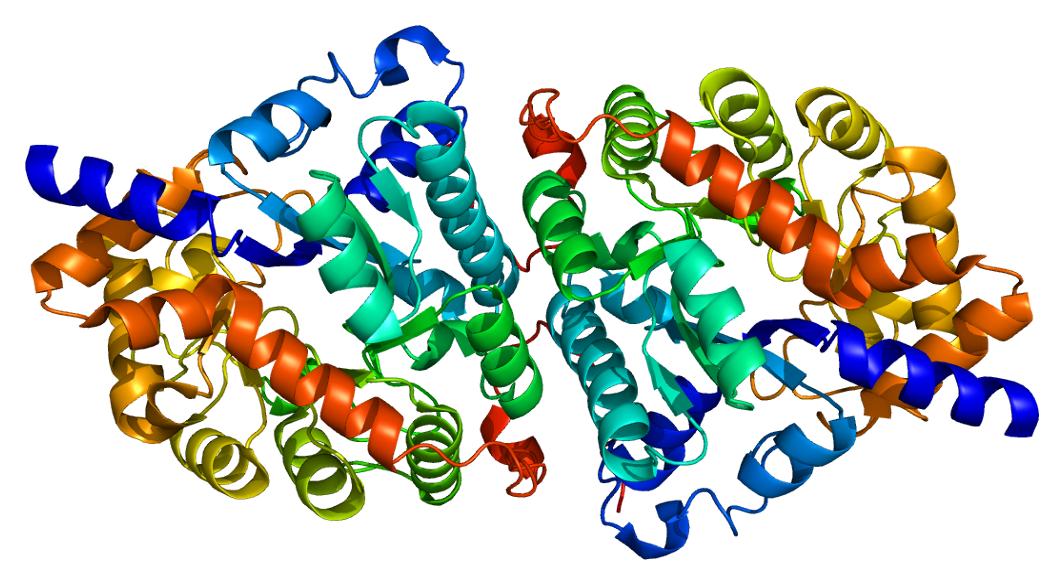

Identifiers
- Aliases: DPEP1, MBD1, MDP, RDP, dipeptidase 1 (renal), dipeptidase 1
- External IDs: OMIM: 179780; MGI: 94917; GeneCards: DPEP1
Available structures
PDB	Ortholog search: PDBe RCSB
PDB	List of PDB id codes 1ITQ, 1ITU
Enzyme activity
EC #	BRENDA	ExPASy	KEGG	MetaCyc
3.4.13.19	↗	↗	↗	↗
3.5.2.6	↗	↗	↗	↗

Gene location (Human)
Chr.	Chromosome 16 (human)
Band	16q24.3	Start	89,613,308 bp
Band	16q24.3	End	89,638,456 bp

Gene location (Mouse)
Chr.	Chromosome 8 (mouse)
Band	8 E1|8 72.08 cM	Start	123,912,981 bp
Band	8 E1|8 72.08 cM	End	123,928,551 bp
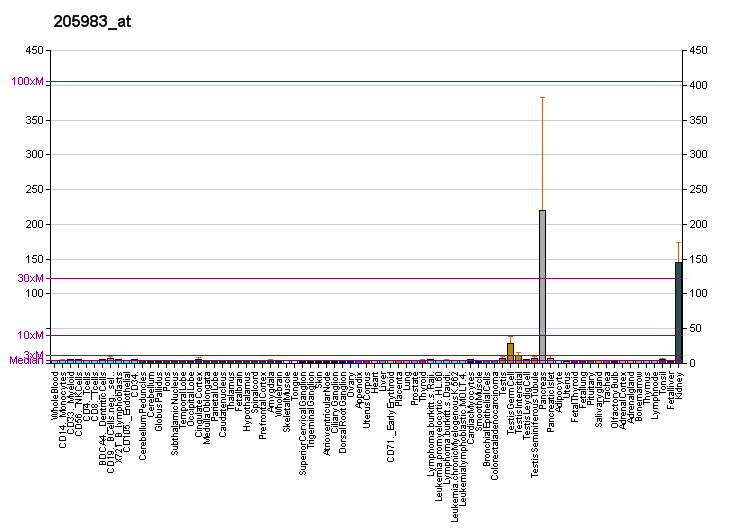
RNA expression pattern
Bgee	Human / Mouse (ortholog); Top expressed in: mucosa of ileum; body of pancreas; human kidney; kidney tubule; left testis; right testis; duodenum; jejunal mucosa; glomerulus; metanephric glomerulus / Top expressed in: tunica adventitia of aorta; ascending aorta; jejunum; right kidney; gastrula; aortic valve; human kidney; tunica media of zone of aorta; carotid body; Paneth cell; More reference expression data
BioGPS	More reference expression data
Gene ontology
Molecular function	metallodipeptidase activity; zinc ion binding; metal ion binding; cysteine-type endopeptidase inhibitor activity involved in apoptotic process; peptidase activity; GPI anchor binding; modified amino acid binding; protein binding; metalloexopeptidase activity; hydrolase activity; metallopeptidase activity; dipeptidyl-peptidase activity; dipeptidase activity
Cellular component	cell projection; membrane; plasma membrane; apical part of cell; apical plasma membrane; anchored component of membrane; extracellular exosome; microvillus membrane; extracellular space; nucleus; cell junction
Biological process	cellular response to calcium ion; negative regulation of cysteine-type endopeptidase activity involved in apoptotic process; leukotriene metabolic process; glutathione metabolic process; antibiotic metabolic process; negative regulation of apoptotic process; proteolysis; negative regulation of cell migration; xenobiotic metabolic process; cellular response to nitric oxide; homocysteine metabolic process; cellular lactam catabolic process; apoptotic process
Sources:Amigo / QuickGO
Orthologs
Databases	NCBI: entry; OMA: entry
Species	Human	Mouse
Entrez	1800	13479
Ensembl	ENSG00000015413	ENSMUSG00000019278
UniProt	P16444	P31428
RefSeq (mRNA)	NM_001128141; NM_004413	NM_007876
RefSeq (protein)	NP_001121613; NP_004404	NP_031902
Location (UCSC)	Chr 16: 89.61 – 89.64 Mb	Chr 8: 123.91 – 123.93 Mb
PubMed search
- Wikidata
View/Edit Human	View/Edit Mouse

Dipeptidase 1 (DPEP1), or renal dipeptidase, is a membrane-bound glycoprotein responsible for hydrolyzing dipeptides. It is found in the microsomal fraction of the porcine kidney cortex. It exists as a disulfide-linked homodimer that is glygosylphosphatidylinositol (GPI)-anchored to the renal brush border of the kidney. The active site on each homodimer is made up of a barrel subunit with binuclear zinc ions that are bridged by the Gly125 side-chain located at the bottom of the barrel.

== Structure ==
The gene coding for DPEP1 is 6 kb long and consists of ten exons and nine introns. The protein itself is made of 411 amino acid residues and is only transcribed in kidney cells. Although disulfide linkages in DPEP1 do not contribute to the enzyme’s activity, they are essential for the enzyme’s proper function because they keep the enzyme’s subunits together and attached to the renal brush border. Cysteine 261 is involved in disulfide linkage between the enzyme’s subunits, and is also located very close to both the site of the GPI-anchor and the membrane, suggesting that it is also involved in the enzyme’s linkage to the membrane.

DPEP1 is also a metalloenzyme that specifically uses zinc as its cofactor. The enzyme’s typical zinc content is 1.42 ug/mg. The addition of cobalt or manganese ions cause the enzyme to take on different conformations, which suggests that the enzyme may be able to hydrolyze different dipeptides depending on which metal ions are present—aka the metal-content of one’s micronutrient intake could affect their renal dipeptidase’s ability to metabolize various dipeptides.

== Function ==
The primary function of DPEP1 is to hydrolyze various dipeptides in renal metabolism. Specifically, it has been found to hydrolyze glutathione and its conjugates such as leukotriene D (Kozak and Tate, 1982).

Several pieces of evidence suggest that DPEP1 is also responsible for the hydrolysis of the beta-lactam ring of various THM-class antibiotics, such as penem and carbapenem (Campbell et al., 1984). First, the metabolism of these THM-class antibiotics is known to be localized in the kidney, specifically by a membrane-bound protein. Second, the metabolism of these antibiotics is significantly hindered when the zinc concentration is altered, suggesting the enzyme responsible for the drugs’ metabolism is a zinc-metalloenzyme. Finally, when DPEP1 was experimentally added to penem and carbapenem antibiotics in vitro, the resulting products were structurally identical to their respective metabolites found in an organism's urine (8). The hydrolysis of these antibiotics hinders their antibacterial capabilities, so information on the specific structure of DPEPI is highly sought after in order to find viable inhibitors that could be taken along with these antibiotics to make them more effective.

Earlier, beta-lactamase enzymes were thought to occur only in bacteria, where their probable function was in protecting the organisms against the action of beta-lactam antibiotics. These antibiotics exhibit selective toxicity against bacteria but virtual inertness against many eukaryotic cells (Adachi et al., 1990).[supplied by OMIM]

== Reaction Mechanism ==
When hydrolyzing a substrate, DPEP1 goes through a tetrahedral intermediate, after which the bridging solvent attacks the face of the carbonyl carbon of the scissile peptide bond. Although DPEP1 shows preference for dipeptide substrates with D amino acids at the carboxy positions, it has been shown that DPEP1 can accommodate substrates with both D and L amino acids.

== Interactions ==
Dipeptidase 1 has been shown to interact with KIAA1279.

== Cancer ==
DPEP1 has been found to be highly expressed in colon tumor cells compared to normal colon cells—one study even found a ≥2 fold over-expression of DPEP1. Increased levels of DPEP1 have also been detected in colorectal cancer patients, suggesting that DPEP1 is a viable marker for disseminated colon tumor cells.
