= Pull-through procedure =

- Specialty: General surgery

A pull-through procedure is the definitive operation for Hirschsprung disease, involving the removal of the abnormal segment of bowel that has no nerves, pulling through the normal bowel and connecting it to the anus. Several types of pull-through procedures exist including the Soave, Swenson and Duhamel. It can be performed using an open or minimally invasive approach.

== Aim ==
A pull-through procedure is the definitive treatment for Hirschsprung disease, with the aim of removing the abnormal part of the bowel and joining the normal part of the intestine with the anus.

== Swenson pull-through ==
The original pull-through procedure was designed by Orvar Swenson and his colleague Alexander Bill. The abnormal aganglionic part of the bowel is resected down to the sigmoid colon and rectum, and the normal colon and the low rectum are subsequently joined.

== Duhamel pull-through ==
The Duhamel pull-through is a modified Swenson's pull-through, first described in 1956.

== Soave pull-through ==
The Soave procedure involves resecting the mucosa and submucosa of the rectum and pulling through the normal ganglionic bowel through the aganglionic muscular cuff of the rectum. It was introduced in the 1960s and initially did not include a formal join. It depended on scar tissue formation between the pull-through segment and the surrounding aganglionic bowel. The procedure was later modified by Boley.

== Anorectal myomectomy ==
If the segment of Hirschsprung's is short, anorectal myomectomy may be an alternative surgical option.

== Laparoscopic approach ==
Georgeson first described laparoscopic surgical treatment of Hirschsprung's in 1999. Transanal pull-through procedures do not require an intra-abdominal dissection.

== Complications ==
Complications include anaesthetic risks, infection, bleeding and perforation of the bowel. Frequent loose stools may cause nappy rash. Toilet training may also pose problems. Occasionally a temporary stoma is required. A pull-through may sometimes fail if some of the abnormal bowel is left behind.
