= Endothelin =

Vasoconstricting peptide family

Endothelin family
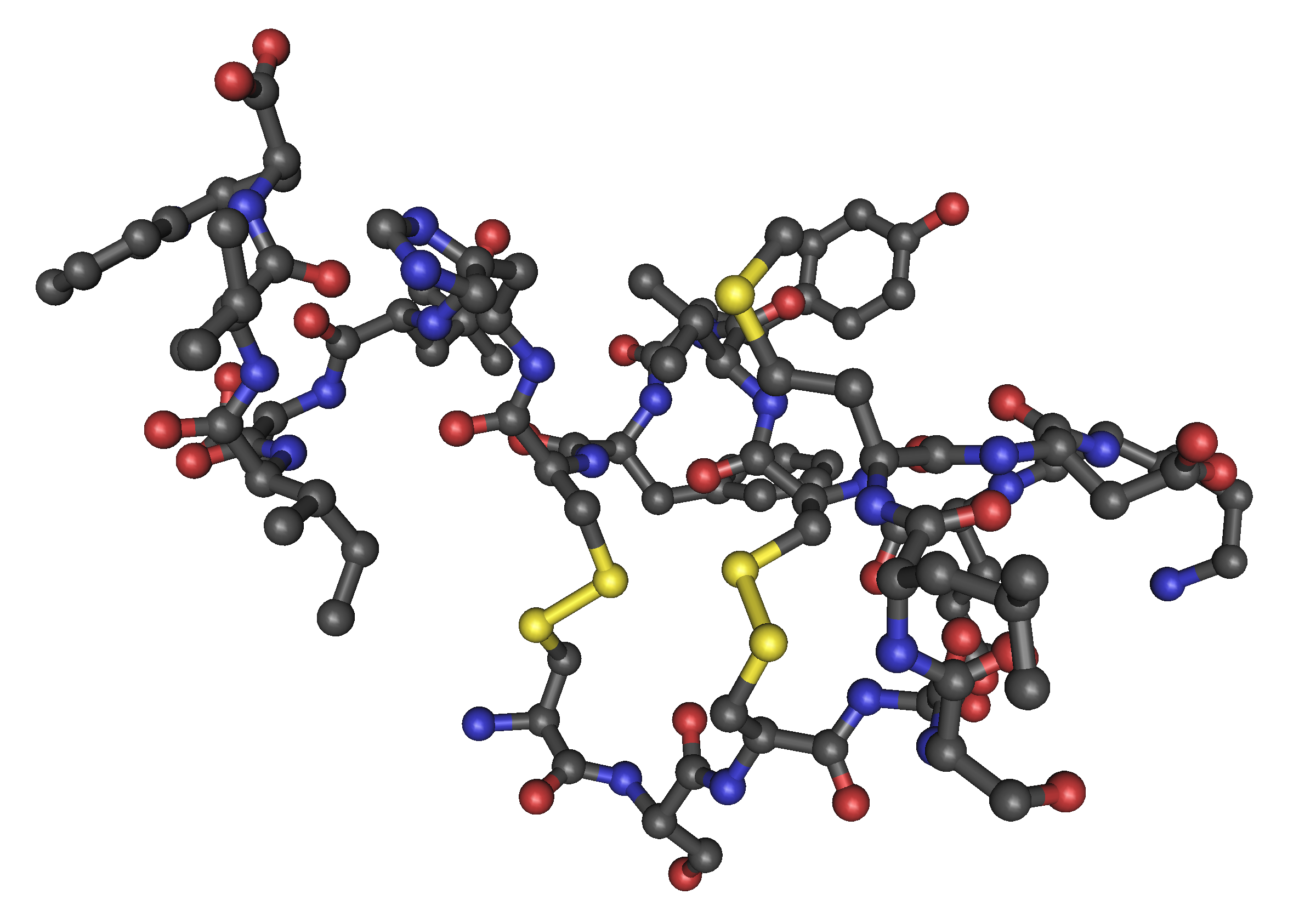

Identifiers
- Symbol: Endothelin
- Pfam: PF00322
- InterPro: IPR001928
- PROSITE: PDOC00243
- SCOP2: 1edp / SCOPe / SUPFAM
- OPM superfamily: 147
- OPM protein: 3cmh
Available protein structures:
- PDB: IPR001928 PF00322 (ECOD; PDBsum)
- AlphaFold: IPR001928; PF00322

Endothelin 1

Identifiers
- Symbol: EDN1
- NCBI gene: 1906
- HGNC: 3176
- OMIM: 131240
- RefSeq: NM_001955
- UniProt: P05305

Other data
- Locus: Chr. 6 p23-p24
Search for
- Structures: Swiss-model
- Domains: InterPro

Endothelin 2

Identifiers
- Symbol: EDN2
- NCBI gene: 1907
- HGNC: 3177
- OMIM: 131241
- RefSeq: NM_001956
- UniProt: P20800

Other data
- Locus: Chr. 1 p34
Search for
- Structures: Swiss-model
- Domains: InterPro

Endothelin 3

Identifiers
- Symbol: EDN3
- HGNC: 3178
- OMIM: 131242
- RefSeq: NM_000114
- UniProt: P14138

Other data
- Locus: Chr. 20 q13.2-q13.3
Search for
- Structures: Swiss-model
- Domains: InterPro

Endothelins are peptides with receptors and effects in many body organs. Endothelin constricts blood vessels and raises blood pressure. The endothelins are normally kept in balance by other mechanisms, but when overexpressed, they contribute to high blood pressure (hypertension), heart disease, and potentially other diseases.

Endothelins are 21-amino acid vasoconstricting peptides produced primarily in the endothelium having a key role in vascular homeostasis. Endothelins are implicated in vascular diseases of several organ systems, including the heart, lungs, kidneys, and brain. As of 2018, endothelins remain under extensive basic and clinical research to define their roles in several organ systems.

== Etymology ==
Endothelins derived the name from their isolation in cultured endothelial cells.

== Isoforms ==
There are three isoforms of the peptide (identified as ET-1, 2, 3), each encoded by a separate gene, with varying regions of expression and binding to at least four known endothelin receptors, ET_{A}, ET_{B1}, ET_{B2} and ET_{C}.

The human genes for endothelin-1 (ET-1), endothelin-2 (ET-2), and endothelin-3 (ET-3) are located on chromosomes 6, 1, and 20, respectively.

== Mechanism of action and function ==
Endothelin functions through activation of two G protein-coupled receptors, endothelin_{A} and endothelin_{B} receptor (ETA and ETB, respectively). These two subtypes of endothelin receptor are distinguished in the laboratory by the order of their affinity for the three endothelin peptides: the ETA receptor is selective for ET-1, whereas the ETB receptor has the same affinity for all three ET peptides. The two types of ET receptor are distributed across diverse cells and organs, but with different levels of expression and activity, indicating a multiple-organ ET system. Most endothelin receptors in the human cerebral cortex (~90%) are of the ETB subtype.

Endothelin-1 is the most powerful endogenous chemical affecting vascular tone across organ systems. Secretion of endothelin-1 from the vascular endothelium signals vasoconstriction and influences local cellular growth and survival. ET-1 has been implicated in the development and progression of several cardiovascular diseases, such as atherosclerosis and hypertension. Endothelin also has roles in mitogenesis, cell survival, angiogenesis, bone growth, nociceptor function, and cancer onset mechanisms. Clinically, anti-ET drugs are used to treat pulmonary arterial hypertension.

Endothelin-2 differs from endothelin-1 by two amino acids, and sometimes has the same affinity as endothelin-1 for ETA and ETB receptors. Studies have shown that endothelin-2 plays a significant role in ovarian physiology and could impact the pathophysiology of heart failure, immunology, and cancer.

== Physiological effects ==
Endothelins are the most potent vasoconstrictors known. Overproduction of endothelin in the lungs may cause pulmonary hypertension, which was treatable in preliminary research by bosentan, sitaxentan or ambrisentan.

Endothelins have involvement in cardiovascular function, fluid-electrolyte homeostasis, and neuronal mechanisms across diverse cell types. Endothelin receptors are present in the three pituitary lobes which display increased metabolic activity when exposed to ET-1 in the blood or ventricular system.

ET-1 contributes to the vascular dysfunction associated with cardiovascular disease, particularly atherosclerosis and hypertension. The ET_{A} receptor for ET-1 is primarily located on vascular smooth muscle cells, mediating vasoconstriction, whereas the ET_{B} receptor for ET-1 is primarily located on endothelial cells, causing vasodilation due to nitric oxide release.

The binding of platelets to the endothelial cell receptor LOX-1 causes a release of endothelin, which induces endothelial dysfunction.

== Clinical significance ==
The ubiquitous distribution of endothelin peptides and receptors implicates involvement in a wide variety of physiological and pathological processes among different organ systems. Among numerous diseases potentially occurring from endothelin dysregulation are:

- several types of cancer
- cerebral vasospasm following subarachnoid hemorrhage
- arterial hypertension, pulmonary hypertension, and other cardiovascular disorders
- pain mediation
- cardiac hypertrophy and heart failure
- Dengue haemorrhagic fever
- Type II diabetes
- some cases of Hirschsprung disease

In insulin resistance the high levels of blood insulin results in increased production and activity of ET-1, which promotes vasoconstriction and elevates blood pressure.

ET-1 impairs glucose uptake in the skeletal muscles of insulin resistant subjects, thereby worsening insulin resistance.

In preliminary research, injection of endothelin-1 into a lateral cerebral ventricle was shown to potently stimulate glucose metabolism in specified interconnected circuits of the brain, and to induce convulsions, indicating its potential for diverse neural effects in conditions such as epilepsy. Receptors for endothelin-1 exist in brain neurons, indicating a potential role in neural functions.

== Antagonists ==
Earliest antagonists discovered for ET_{A} were BQ123, and for ET_{B}, BQ788. An ET_{A}-selective antagonist, ambrisentan was approved for treatment of pulmonary arterial hypertension in 2007, followed by a more selective ET_{A} antagonist, sitaxentan, which was later withdrawn due to potentially lethal effects in the liver. Bosentan was a precursor to macitentan, which was approved in 2013.
