= Queen Louise's Children's Hospital =

Danish hospital

Geography
- Location: Copenhagen, Denmark
- Coordinates: 55.69°N 12.58°E

History
- Opened: 1879
- Closed: 1971

Links
- Lists: Hospitals in Denmark

Queen Louise's Children's Hospital (Danish: Dronning Louises Børnehospital) was a hospital in Copenhagen, Denmark from 1879 to 1971. It was named for and supported by Louise of Hesse-Kassel.
