= Hirschsprung's disease =

Birth defect in which the intestine lacks certain nerves

- Other names: Aganglionic megacolon, congenital megacolon, congenital intestinal aganglionosis
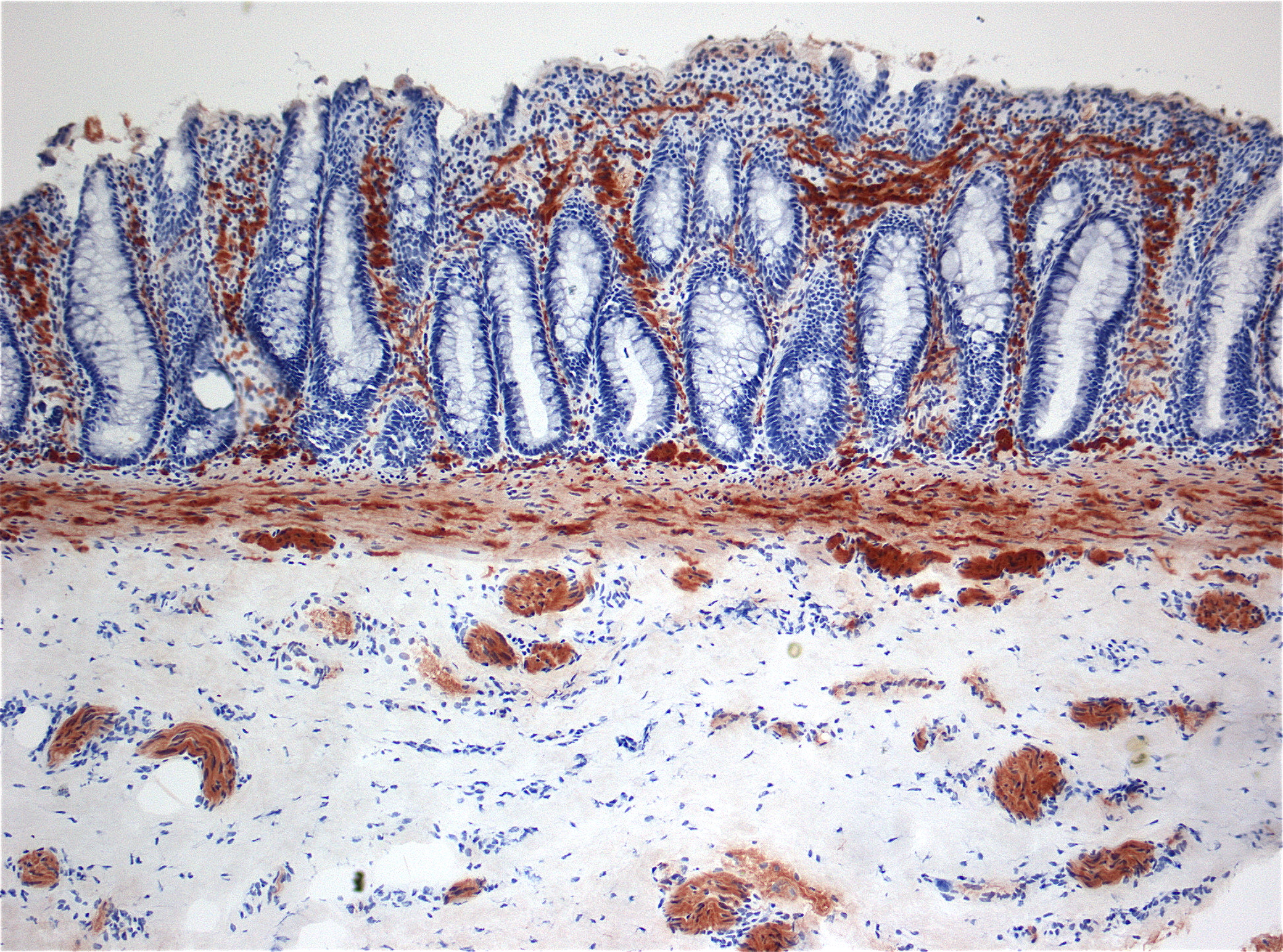
- Histopathology of Hirschsprung disease showing abnormal acetylcholine esterase (AchE)-positive nerve fibers (brown) in the mucosa
- Specialty: Medical genetics
- Symptoms: Constipation, vomiting, abdominal pain, diarrhea, slow growth
- Complications: Enterocolitis, megacolon, bowel obstruction, intestinal perforation
- Usual onset: First 2 months of life
- Types: Short-segment, long-segment
- Causes: Genetic
- Risk factors: Family history
- Diagnostic method: Based on symptoms, biopsy
- Differential diagnosis: Chronic intestinal pseudo-obstruction, meconium ileus
- Treatment: Surgery
- Frequency: 1 in 5,000 newborns

Hirschsprung's disease (HD or HSCR) is a birth defect in which nerves are missing from parts of the intestine. The most prominent symptom is constipation. Other symptoms may include vomiting, abdominal pain, diarrhea and slow growth. Most children develop signs and symptoms shortly after birth. However, others may be diagnosed later in infancy or early childhood. About half of all children with Hirschsprung's disease are diagnosed in the first year of life. Complications may include enterocolitis, megacolon, bowel obstruction and intestinal perforation.

The disorder may occur by itself or in association with other genetic disorders such as Down syndrome or Waardenburg syndrome. About half of isolated cases are linked to a specific genetic mutation, and about 20% occur within families. Some of these occur in an autosomal dominant manner. The cause of the remaining cases is unclear. If otherwise normal parents have one child with the condition, the next child has a 4% risk of being affected. The condition is divided into two main types, short-segment and long-segment, depending on how much of the bowel is affected. Rarely, the small bowel may be affected, as well. Diagnosis is based on symptoms and confirmed by biopsy.

Treatment is generally by surgery to remove the affected section of bowel. The surgical procedure most often carried out is known as a "pull through". Occasionally, an intestinal transplantation may be recommended. Hirschsprung's disease occurs in about one in 5,000 of newborns. Males are more often affected than females. Dutch anatomist Frederik Ruysch may have described a case in 1691, although the formal description as "congenital dilatation of the colon" was by Danish physician Harald Hirschsprung in 1888.

== Signs and symptoms ==
Megacolon caused by Hirschsprung's disease

Typically, Hirschsprung disease is diagnosed shortly after birth, although it may develop well into adulthood, because of the presence of megacolon, or because the baby fails to pass the first stool (meconium) within 48 hours of delivery. Normally, 90% of babies pass their first meconium within 24 hours, and 99% within 48 hours.

Some other signs and symptoms in newborns include a swollen belly, vomiting (green or brown vomit), and flatulence. In older children, some other signs and symptoms include chronic constipation, flatulence, swollen belly, fatigue, and failure to thrive.

Other symptoms include symptoms of bowel perforation such as vomiting, constipation, poor feeding, lethargy, and diarrhea. Symptoms of bowel obstruction would include vomiting of bile and abdominal distension. Those who do not pass stools after 36 to 48 hours after birth should raise suspicion of Hirschsprung disease. Such suspicion can also be risen if there is only passage of stools after suppository, rectal exam, or enema. Children who do not respond to constipation treatment for six months should also raise suspicion of such disease. Enterocolitis, an acute complication of Hirschsprung disease, is characterized by sudden onset of fever, abdominal distension, vomiting, passage of bloody stools or release of explosive gas or stools after rectal examination.

Some cases are diagnosed later, into childhood, but usually before age 10. The child may experience fecal retention, constipation, or abdominal distention.

=== Associated syndromes ===
Hirschsprung's disease can also present as part of multi-system disorders, such as:

- Bardet–Biedl syndrome
- Cartilage–hair hypoplasia
- Congenital central hypoventilation syndrome
- MEN2
- Mowat–Wilson syndrome
- Smith–Lemli–Opitz syndrome
- Trisomy 21 (Down syndrome)
- Some forms of Waardenburg syndrome

== Cause ==
The disorder may occur by itself or in association with other genetic disorders such as Down syndrome. About half of isolated cases are linked to a specific genetic mutation and about 20% occur within families. Some of these occur in an autosomal dominant manner. The cause of the remaining cases is unclear. If otherwise normal parents have one child with the condition, the next child has a 4% risk of being affected.

=== Genetics ===
Type	OMIM	Gene	Locus
HSCR1	142623	RET	10q11.2
HSCR2	600155	EDNRB	13q22
HSCR3	600837	GDNF	5p13.1-p12
HSCR4	131242	EDN3	20q13.2-q13.3
HSCR5	600156	?	21q22
HSCR6	606874	?	3p21
HSCR7	606875	?	19q12
HSCR8	608462	?	16q23
HSCR9	611644	?	4q31-32
—	602229	SOX10	22q13
—	600423	ECE1	1p36.1
—	602018	NRTN	19p13.3
—	602595	GEMIN2 (Gem-associated protein 2)	14q13-q21
—	191315	NTRK1	1q23.1
—	605802	ZEB2	2q22.3

Several genes and specific regions on chromosomes (loci) have been shown or suggested to be associated with Hirschsprung's disease

The RET proto-oncogene accounts for the highest proportion of both familial and sporadic cases, with a wide range of mutations scattered along its entire coding region. A proto-oncogene can cause cancer if it is mutated or overexpressed.

=== RET proto-oncogene ===
RET is a gene that codes for proteins that assist cells of the neural crest in their movement through the digestive tract during the development of the embryo. Those neural crest cells eventually form bundles of nerve cells called ganglions. EDNRB codes for proteins that connect these nerve cells to the digestive tract. Thus, mutations in these two genes could directly lead to the absence of certain nerve fibers in the colon. Research suggests that several genes are associated with Hirschsprung's disease. Also, new research suggests that mutations in genomic sequences involved in regulating EDNRB have a bigger impact on Hirschsprung's disease than previously thought.

RET can mutate in many ways and is associated with Down syndrome. Since Down syndrome is comorbid in 2% of Hirschsprung's cases, a likelihood exists that RET is involved heavily in both Hirschsprung's disease and Down syndrome. RET is also associated with medullary thyroid cancer and neuroblastoma, which is a type of cancer common in children. Both of these disorders are more common in Hirschsprung's patients than in the general population. One function that RET controls is the travel of the neural crest cells through the intestines in the developing fetus. The earlier the RET mutation occurs in Hirschsprung's disease, the more severe the disorder becomes.

=== Other genes ===
Common and rare DNA variations in the neuregulin 1 (NRG1) and NRG3 (NRG3) were first shown to be associated with the disease in Chinese patients through a Genome Wide Association Study by the Hong Kong team in 2009 and 2012, respectively Subsequent studies in both Asian and Caucasian patients confirmed the initial findings by the University of Hong Kong. Both rare and common variants in these two genes have been identified in additional Chinese, Thai, Korean, Indonesian, and Spanish patients. These two genes are known to play a role in the formation of the enteric nervous system; thus, they are likely to be involved in the pathology of Hirschsprung's disease, at least in some cases.

Another gene associated with this condition is NADPH oxidase, EF-hand calcium binding domain 5 (NOX5). This gene is located on the long arm of chromosome 15 (15q23).

== Pathophysiology ==
During normal prenatal development, cells from the neural crest migrate into the large intestine (colon) to form the networks of nerves called the myenteric plexus (Auerbach plexus) (between the smooth muscle layers of the gastrointestinal tract wall) and the submucosal plexus (Meissner plexus) (within the submucosa of the gastrointestinal tract wall). In Hirschsprung disease, the migration is not complete and part of the colon lacks these nerve bodies that regulate the activity of the colon. The affected segment of the colon cannot relax and pass stool through the colon, creating an obstruction.

The most accepted theory of the cause of Hirschsprung is a defect in the craniocaudal migration of neuroblasts originating from the neural crest that occurs during the first 12 weeks of gestation. Defects in the differentiation of neuroblasts into ganglion cells and accelerated ganglion cell destruction within the intestine may also contribute to the disorder.

This lack of ganglion cells in the myenteric and submucosal plexus is well documented in Hirschsprung's disease. With Hirschsprung's disease, the segment lacking neurons (aganglionic) becomes constricted, causing the normal, proximal section of bowel to become distended with feces. This narrowing of the distal colon and the failure of relaxation in the aganglionic segment are thought to be caused by the lack of neurons containing nitric oxide synthase.

The most cited feature is absence of ganglion cells: notably in males, 75% have none in the end of the colon (rectosigmoid) and 8% lack ganglion cells in the entire colon. The enlarged section of the bowel is found proximally, while the narrowed, aganglionic section is found distally, closer to the end of the bowel. The absence of ganglion cells results in a persistent overstimulation of nerves in the affected region, resulting in contraction.

The equivalent disease in pigs is segmental colon aganglionosis.

The equivalent disease in horses is lethal white syndrome.

== Diagnosis ==
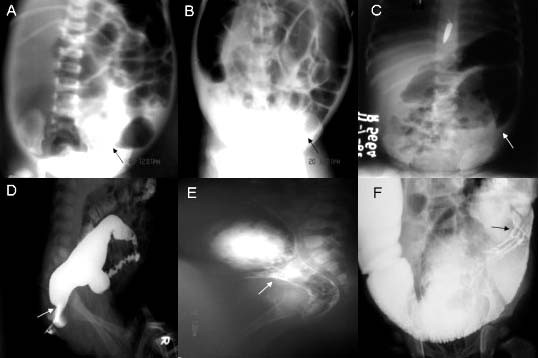
A: Plain abdominal radiograph showing a PARTZ at rectosigmoid, arrow. B: Plain abdominal radiograph showing a PARTZ at midsigmoid, arrow. C: Plain abdominal radiograph showing a PARTZ at descending colon, arrow. D: Contrast enema showing a CETZ at rectosigmoid, arrow. E: Contrast enema showing a CETZ at midsigmoid, arrow. F: Contrast enema showing a CETZ at descending colon, arrow.

Definitive diagnosis is made by suction biopsy of the distally narrowed segment. A histologic examination of the tissue would show a lack of ganglionic nerve cells. Diagnostic techniques involve anorectal manometry, barium enema, and rectal biopsy. The suction rectal biopsy is considered the current international gold standard in the diagnosis of Hirschsprung's disease.

Radiologic findings may also assist with diagnosis. An abdominal x-ray can reveal a lack of stool in the large intestine or a bulging caused by blocked stool. Cineanography (fluoroscopy of contrast medium passing anorectal region) assists in determining the level of the affected intestines.

== Treatment ==
Treatment of Hirschsprung's disease consists of surgical removal (resection) of the abnormal section of the colon, followed by reanastomosis.

=== Colostomy ===
The first stage of treatment used to be a reversible colostomy. In this approach, the healthy end of the large intestine is cut and attached to an opening created on the front of the abdomen. The contents of the bowel are discharged through the hole in the abdomen and into a bag. Later, when the patient's weight, age, and condition are right, the "new" functional end of the bowel is connected with the anus. The first surgical treatment involving surgical resection followed by reanastomosis without a colostomy occurred as early as 1933 by Doctor Baird in Birmingham on a one-year-old boy.

=== Other procedures ===
The Swedish-American surgeon Orvar Swenson (1909–2012), who discovered the cause of Hirschsprung's, first performed its surgical treatment, the pull-through surgery, in 1948. The pull-through procedure repairs the colon by connecting the functioning portion of the bowel to the anus. The pull-through procedure is the typical method for treating Hirschsprung's in younger patients. Swenson devised the original procedure, and the pull-through surgery has been modified many times.

Currently, several different surgical approaches are used, which include the Swenson, Soave, Duhamel, and Boley procedures. The Swenson procedure leaves a small portion of the diseased bowel. The Soave procedure, named after the Italian pediatric surgeon, Franco Soave (1917–1984), leaves the outer wall of the colon unaltered. The Boley procedure, pioneered by the American surgeon, Scott Boley (born 1941), is a small modification of the Soave procedure, so the term "Soave-Boley" procedure is sometimes used. The Duhamel procedure, named for the French pediatric surgeon Bernard Duhamel (1917–1996), uses a surgical stapler to connect the good and bad bowel.

For the 15% of children who do not obtain full bowel control, other treatments are available. Constipation may be remedied by laxatives or a high-fiber diet. In those patients, serious dehydration can play a major factor in their lifestyles. A lack of bowel control may be addressed by an ileostomy – similar to a colostomy, but uses the end of the small intestine rather than the colon. The Malone antegrade colonic enema (ACE) is also an option. In a Malone ACE, a tube goes through the abdominal wall to the appendix, or if available, to the colon. The bowel is then flushed daily. Children as young as 6 years of age may administer this daily flush on their own.

If the affected portion of the lower intestine is restricted to the lower portion of the rectum, other surgical procedures may be performed, such as a posterior rectal myectomy. The prognosis is good in 70% of cases. Chronic postoperative constipation is present in 7 to 8% of the operated cases. Postoperative enterocolitis, a severe manifestation, is present in the 10–20% of operated patients.

== Epidemiology ==
According to a 1984 study conducted in Maryland, Hirschsprung's disease appears in 18.6 per 100,000 live births. In Japan, it occurs at a similar rate of about one in 5,000 births (20 per 100,000). It is more common in male than female (4.32:1) and in white rather than nonwhite. Nine percent of the Hirschsprung cases were also diagnosed as having Down syndrome. Most cases are diagnosed before the patient is 10 years of age.

== History ==
Dutch anatomist Frederik Ruysch may have described a case in 1691, although the formal description as "congenital dilatation of the colon" was by Danish physician Harald Hirschsprung in 1888.

Hirschsprung's disease is a congenital disorder of the colon in which certain nerve cells, known as ganglion cells, are absent, causing chronic constipation. In patients with Hirschsprung disease, both myenteric and submucosal plexuses are absent. A barium enema is the mainstay of diagnosis of Hirschsprung's, though a rectal biopsy showing the lack of ganglion cells is the only certain method of diagnosis.

The first publication on an important genetic discovery of the disease was from Martucciello Giuseppe et al. in 1992. The authors described a case of a patient with total colonic aganglionosis associated with a 46, XX, del 10 (q11.21 q21.2) karyotype. The major gene of Hirschsprung disease was identified in this chromosomal 10 region, it was the RET proto-oncogene.

The usual treatment is "pull-through" surgery where the portion of the colon that does have nerve cells is pulled through and sewn over the part that lacks nerve cells. For a long time, Hirschsprung's was considered a multifactorial disorder, where a combination of nature and nurture was considered to be the cause. However, in August 1993, two articles by independent groups in Nature Genetics said that Hirschsprung's disease could be mapped to a stretch of chromosome 10.

== See also ==
- Achalasia
- Ileus, failure of peristaltic muscle activity in the gut
- Intestinal neuronal dysplasia
- Hirschsprung's disease-type D brachydactyly syndrome
