= Endothelin 3 =

Protein-coding gene in the species Homo sapiens

EDN3

Identifiers
- Aliases: EDN3, ET-3, ET3, HSCR4, PPET3, WS4B, endothelin 3
- External IDs: OMIM: 131242; MGI: 95285; GeneCards: EDN3

Gene location (Human)
Chr.	Chromosome 20 (human)
Band	20q13.32	Start	59,300,443 bp
Band	20q13.32	End	59,325,992 bp

Gene location (Mouse)
Chr.	Chromosome 2 (mouse)
Band	2 H4|2 98.1 cM	Start	174,602,412 bp
Band	2 H4|2 98.1 cM	End	174,625,835 bp
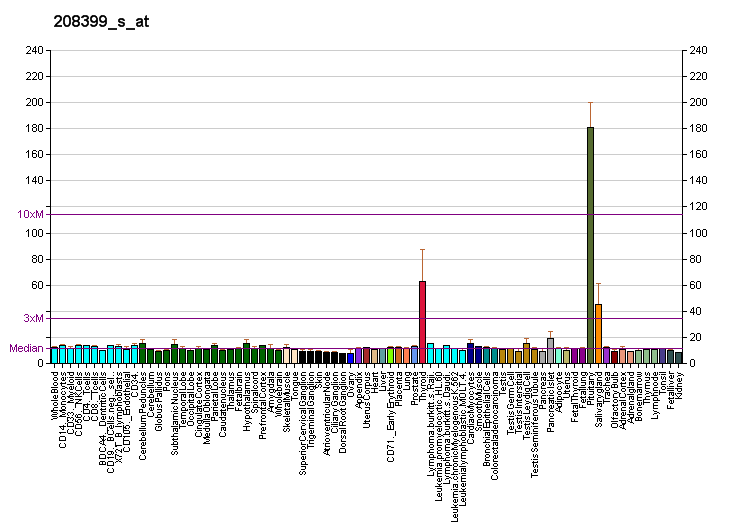

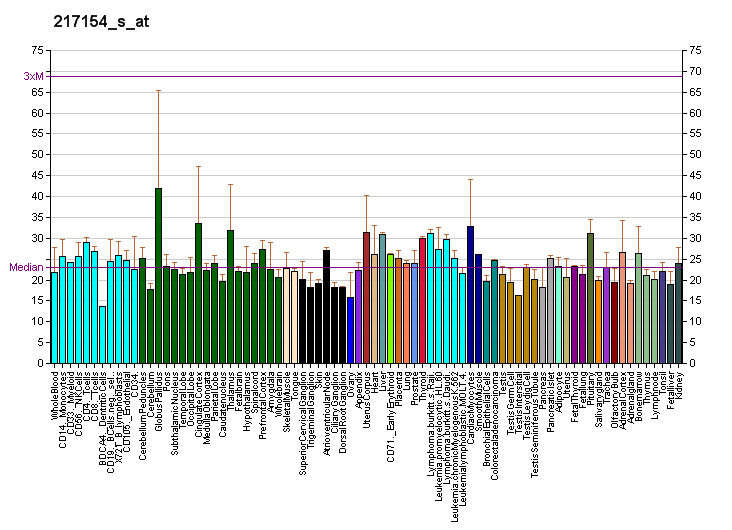
RNA expression pattern
Bgee	Human / Mouse (ortholog); Top expressed in: human penis; jejunal mucosa; gonad; islet of Langerhans; duodenum; vulva; mucosa of ileum; rectum; parotid gland; testicle / Top expressed in: iris; genital tubercle; cecum; left lung lobe; lumbar subsegment of spinal cord; intestinal villus; jejunum; embryo; pineal gland; duodenum; More reference expression data
BioGPS	More reference expression data
Gene ontology
Molecular function	hormone activity; endothelin B receptor binding; signaling receptor binding
Cellular component	extracellular region; intracellular anatomical structure; extracellular space
Biological process	positive regulation of MAP kinase activity; regulation of systemic arterial blood pressure by endothelin; vasoconstriction; cell-cell signaling; blood circulation; neutrophil chemotaxis; positive regulation of heart rate; multicellular organism development; positive regulation of leukocyte chemotaxis; cell surface receptor signaling pathway; vein smooth muscle contraction; regulation of vasoconstriction; peptide hormone secretion; positive regulation of cell differentiation; artery smooth muscle contraction; regulation of gene expression; inositol phosphate-mediated signaling; positive regulation of mitotic nuclear division; positive regulation of hormone secretion; signal transduction; regulation of signaling receptor activity; G protein-coupled receptor signaling pathway; neural crest cell migration; cellular calcium ion homeostasis; positive regulation of cell population proliferation; cellular magnesium ion homeostasis; neuron differentiation; melanocyte differentiation; regulation of cell migration; regulation of developmental pigmentation; positive regulation of potassium ion transmembrane transport
Sources:Amigo / QuickGO
Orthologs
Databases	NCBI: entry; OMA: entry
Species	Human	Mouse
Entrez	1908	13616
Ensembl	ENSG00000124205	ENSMUSG00000027524
UniProt	P14138	P48299
RefSeq (mRNA)	NM_000114; NM_207032; NM_207033; NM_207034; NM_001302455 NM_001302456	NM_007903
RefSeq (protein)	NP_001289384; NP_001289385; NP_996915; NP_996916; NP_996917	NP_031929
Location (UCSC)	Chr 20: 59.3 – 59.33 Mb	Chr 2: 174.6 – 174.63 Mb
PubMed search
- Wikidata
View/Edit Human	View/Edit Mouse

Endothelin-3 is a protein that in humans is encoded by the EDN3 gene.

The protein encoded by this gene is a member of the endothelin family. Endothelins are endothelium-derived vasoactive peptides involved in a variety of biological functions. The active form of this protein is a 21 amino acid peptide processed from the precursor protein. The active peptide is a ligand for endothelin receptor type B (EDNRB). The interaction of this endothelin with EDNRB is essential for development of neural crest-derived cell lineages, such as melanocytes and enteric neurons. Mutations in this gene and EDNRB have been associated with Hirschsprung disease (HSCR) and Waardenburg syndrome (WS), which are congenital disorders involving neural crest-derived cells. Four alternatively spliced transcript variants encoding three distinct isoforms have been observed.
