= Endothelin 1 =

Vasoconstricting peptide

EDN1
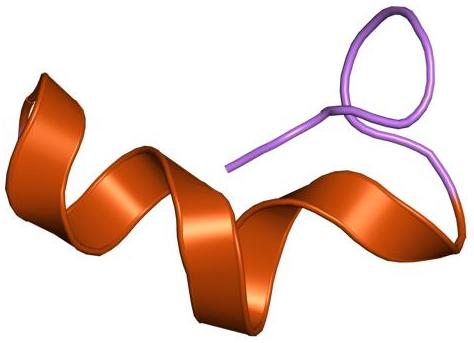

Identifiers
- Aliases: EDN1, ARCND3, ET1, HDLCQ7, QME, endothelin 1, PPET1
- External IDs: MGI: 95283; GeneCards: EDN1
Available structures
PDB	Ortholog search: PDBe RCSB
PDB	List of PDB id codes 1EDN, 1EDP, 1T7H, 1V6R, 6DK5, 5GLH

Gene location (Human)
Chr.	Chromosome 6 (human)
Band	6p24.1	Start	12,290,361 bp
Band	6p24.1	End	12,297,194 bp

Gene location (Mouse)
Chr.	Chromosome 13 (mouse)
Band	13 A4|13 20.82 cM	Start	42,454,952 bp
Band	13 A4|13 20.82 cM	End	42,461,466 bp
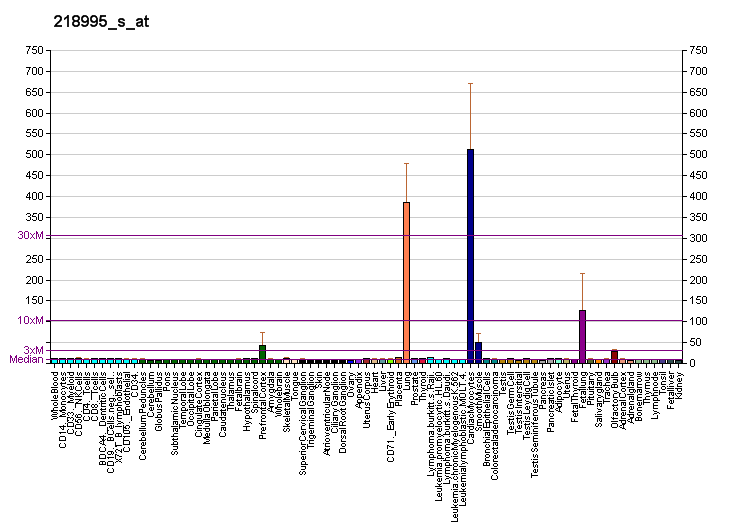
RNA expression pattern
Bgee	Human / Mouse (ortholog); Top expressed in: lower lobe of lung; buccal mucosa cell; right lung; subcutaneous adipose tissue; upper lobe of left lung; skin of hip; human penis; islet of Langerhans; tibial nerve; rectum / Top expressed in: pharynx; vasculature of trunk; aortic arches; right lung lobe; dorsal aorta; endothelial cell of lymphatic vessel; left colon; vascular endothelium; left lung lobe; external carotid artery; More reference expression data
BioGPS	More reference expression data
Gene ontology
Molecular function	hormone activity; signaling receptor binding; cytokine activity; endothelin B receptor binding; protein binding; endothelin A receptor binding
Cellular component	cytoplasm; Weibel-Palade body; basal part of cell; extracellular region; rough endoplasmic reticulum lumen; extracellular space; transport vesicle
Biological process	skeletal system development; response to amino acid; positive regulation of cytosolic calcium ion concentration involved in phospholipase C-activating G protein-coupled signaling pathway; positive regulation of MAP kinase activity; regulation of sensory perception of pain; vasoconstriction; body fluid secretion; positive regulation of sarcomere organization; positive regulation of cardiac muscle hypertrophy; cell surface receptor signaling pathway; multicellular organism aging; artery smooth muscle contraction; cellular response to interferon-gamma; positive regulation of chemokine-mediated signaling pathway; phosphatidylinositol 3-kinase signaling; response to leptin; positive regulation of mitotic nuclear division; cellular response to hypoxia; response to muscle stretch; cellular response to calcium ion; cellular response to transforming growth factor beta stimulus; positive regulation of renal sodium excretion; blood vessel morphogenesis; negative regulation of blood coagulation; response to nicotine; in utero embryonic development; neutrophil chemotaxis; development of the heart; positive regulation of prostaglandin secretion; vein smooth muscle contraction; cartilage development; rhythmic excitation; protein kinase C-activating G protein-coupled receptor signaling pathway; cellular response to glucocorticoid stimulus; branching involved in blood vessel morphogenesis; negative regulation of hormone secretion; positive regulation of smooth muscle contraction; negative regulation of nitric-oxide synthase biosynthetic process; positive regulation of prostaglandin-endoperoxide synthase activity; positive regulation of urine volume; positive regulation of JUN kinase activity; leukocyte activation; membrane depolarization; negative regulation of transcription by RNA polymerase II; response to ozone; respiratory gaseous exchange by respiratory system; positive regulation of heart rate; regulation of blood pressure; response to lipopolysaccharide; response to prostaglandin F; regulation of vasoconstriction; cellular response to interleukin-1; response to salt; positive regulation of cell size; middle ear morphogenesis; sensory perception of pain; prostaglandin biosynthetic process; dorsal/ventral pattern formation; phospholipase D-activating G protein-coupled receptor signaling pathway; positive regulation of odontogenesis; regulation of pH; positive regulation of smooth muscle cell proliferation; protein kinase C deactivation; histamine secretion; maternal process involved in parturition; intracellular signal transduction; response to hypoxia; neural crest cell development; regulation of systemic arterial blood pressure by endothelin; nitric oxide transport; positive regulation of cell migration; response to testosterone; positive regulation of cytosolic calcium ion concentration; epithelial fluid transport; positive regulation of nitric oxide biosynthetic process; cell-cell signaling; cellular response to tumor necrosis factor; response to activity; response to dexamethasone; superoxide anion generation; positive regulation of endothelial cell migration; cellular response to peptide hormone stimulus; cellular response to fatty acid; peptide hormone secretion; cellular response to mineralocorticoid stimulus; positive regulation of cell population proliferation; inositol phosphate-mediated signaling; positive regulation of hormone secretion; negative regulation of smooth muscle cell apoptotic process; calcium-mediated signaling; response to transforming growth factor beta; positive regulation of transcription by RNA polymerase II; positive regulation of DNA-binding transcription factor activity; positive regulation of cell growth involved in cardiac muscle cell development; positive regulation of neutrophil chemotaxis; regulation of signaling receptor activity; G protein-coupled receptor signaling pathway; adenylate cyclase-inhibiting G protein-coupled receptor signaling pathway; regulation of glucose transmembrane transport; negative regulation of gene expression; positive regulation of NIK/NF-kappaB signaling; positive regulation of vascular associated smooth muscle cell proliferation
Sources:Amigo / QuickGO
Orthologs
Databases	NCBI: entry; OMA: entry
Species	Human	Mouse
Entrez	1906	13614
Ensembl	ENSG00000078401	ENSMUSG00000021367
UniProt	P05305	P22387
RefSeq (mRNA)	NM_001168319; NM_001955	NM_010104
RefSeq (protein)	NP_001161791; NP_001946; NP_001161791; NP_001946	NP_034234
Location (UCSC)	Chr 6: 12.29 – 12.3 Mb	Chr 13: 42.45 – 42.46 Mb
PubMed search
- Wikidata
View/Edit Human	View/Edit Mouse

Endothelin 1 (ET-1), also known as preproendothelin-1 (PPET1), is the most potent vasoconstrictor produced by the human body. It is a peptide produced by vascular endothelial cells, as well as by cells in the heart (affecting contractility) and kidney (affecting sodium handling). The protein encoded by this gene – EDN1 – is proteolytically processed to release endothelin 1. Endothelin 1 is one of three isoforms of human endothelin.

== Sources ==
Preproendothelin is precursor of the peptide ET-1. Endothelial cells convert preproendothelin to proendothelin and subsequently to mature endothelin, which the cells release.

== Clinical significance ==
Patients with salt-sensitive hypertension have higher plasma ET-1. Endothelin-1 receptor antagonists (Bosentan) are used in the treatment of pulmonary hypertension. Use of these antagonists prevents pulmonary arterial constriction and thus inhibits pulmonary hypertension.

As of 2020, the role of endothelin-1 in affecting lipid metabolism and insulin resistance in obesity mechanisms was under clinical research.
