= List of Légion d'honneur recipients by name (C) =

The French government gives out the Legion of Honour awards, to both French and foreign nationals, based on a recipient's exemplary services rendered to France, or to the causes supported by France. This award is divided into five distinct categories (in ascending order), i.e. three ranks: Knight, Officer, Commander, and two titles: Grand Officer and Grand Cross. Knight is the most common and is awarded for either at least 20 years of public service or acts of military or civil bravery. The rest of the categories have a quota for the number of years of service in the category below before they can be awarded. The Officer rank requires a minimum of eight years as a Knight, and the Commander, the highest civilian category for a non-French citizen, requires a minimum of five years as an Officer. The Grand Officer and the Grand Cross are awarded only to French citizens, and each requires three years' service in their respective immediately lower rank. The awards are traditionally published and promoted on 14 July.

The following is a non-exhaustive list of recipients of the Legion of Honour awards, since the first ceremony in May 1803. 2,550 individuals can be awarded the insignia every year. The total number of awards is close to 1 million (estimated at 900,000 in 2021, including over 3,000 Grand Cross recipients), with some 92,000 recipients alive today. Only until 2008 was gender parity achieved amongst the yearly list of recipients, with the total number of women recipients since the award's establishment being only 59 at the end of the second French empire and only 26,000 in 2021.

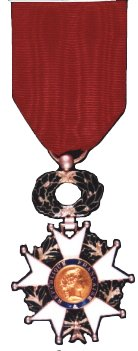

Recipient	Dates (birth – death)	General Work and reason for the recognition	Award Category (Date)
Patrick Cabanel	1961 – Present	French historian	Knight (decree - 6 April 2012)
Joseph Cabassol	1859 – 1928	French lawyer, politician, and banker	Knight (TBA)
Charles Maurice Cabart-Danneville	1846 – 1918	French politician	TBA
Coralie Cahen	1832 – 1899	French philanthropist and sculptor	Knight (decree: 28 December 1888)
Alphonse de Cailleux	1788 – 1876	Painter, connoisseur and arts administrator. Known for being the director of the Musée du Louvre and all the royal museums of France	Knight; Officer (decree: 17 May 1826)
Frédéric Cailliaud	1787 – 1869	French Egyptologist and explorer	TBA
René Caillié	1799 – 1838	French explorer. Known for being the first European to return alive from the town of Timbuktu.	Knight (decree: 10 December 1828)
Roger Caillois	1913 – 1978	French writer, member of the Académie Française	Officer
Rafael Caldera	1916 – 2009	Two time President of Venezuela	TBA
Italo Calvino	1923 – 1985	Italian author.	TBA (1981)
Patrick de Cambourg	1949 – Present	Former Chairman (Mazars Group)	Knight (decree: 13 juillet 2005)
Francis Cammaerts	1916 – 2006	Colombia SOE. Recognised for his operations during World War II.	TBA
Jacques Camou	1792 – 1868	French general	Grand Sash (1857)
Maxime Du Camp	1822 – 1894	French writer and photographer	Officer (1853)
Gordon Campbell	1886 – 1953	British Admiral. Recognised for his actions during World War I	Knight.
James Cameron	1954 – Present	Canadian filmmaker and deep sea explorer	Officer (decree - 2026)
Iris Cantor	1931 – Present	Los Angeles-based philanthropist (medicine and the arts) Recognised for his promotion of appreciation of the French sculptor Auguste Rodin.	Knight (2000); Officer (ceremony: 20 March 2017)
Gautier Capucon	1981 – Present	French cellist	Knight
James Brudenell, 7th Earl of Cardigan	1797 – 1868	British Army Officer (Crimean War). Known for leading the Charge of the Light Brigade at the Battle of Balaclava.	Commander (2 August 1856)
Carl XVI Gustaf de Suède	1946 – Present	King of Sweden	Grand Cross (1980)
Jacques Cariou	1870 – 1951	French army Captain and equestrian, won individual gold, individual bronze and a silver team medal in the 1912 Olympics. Honored for actions at the Battle of Champagne, World War I.	Knight
Alexis Carrel	1873 – 1944	French surgeon and biologist. Recognised for collaboratively developing (with Henry Drysdale Dakin) the Carrel–Dakin method of treating wounds based on chlorine (Dakin's solution) which, preceding the development of antibiotics, was a major medical advance in the care of traumatic wounds.	TBA
Madeleine Carroll	1906 – 1987	English actress. Recognised for overseas work, during World War II, liaising between the forces of the United States Army and the French Resistance, and her post-war fostering of amity between France and the United States.	TBA (1946)
Henry H. Carter	1905 – 2001	American linguistics professor	TBA
George Carter-Campbell	1869 – 1921	Senior British Army officer (World War I and the Second Boer War).	Commander
Mary Cassatt	1844 – 1926	American painter and printmaker	Knight (1904)
Noël Édouard, vicomte de Curières de Castelnau	1851 – 1944	French general (World War I)	Grand Cross
Raoul Castex	1878 – 1968	French admiral	Knight (decree - 6 November 1912); Officer (decree - 10 July 1920); Commander (decree - 15 January 1930); Grand officer (decree - 2 July 1936); Grand Cross (decree - 22 July 1959)
Jacques Jean Félix Casties		Airline pilot. Recognised for his 43 years of professional and military services.	Knight (decree - 19 April 2000)
Giuseppe Castiglione	1829 – 1908	Italian artist	TBA (1893)
Frederick Walker Castle	1908 – 1944	United States Air Force General Officer (World War II)	Knight
Clifton B. Cates	1893 – 1970	United States Marine Corps four-star general (World War I and (World War II)	TBA
Albertus W. Catlin	1868 – 1933	United States Marine Corps General	Knight; Officer
Marcel Caux (born Harold Katte)	1899 – 2004	Australian World War I veteran. Known for being the last known survivor of the Battle of Pozières.	Knight (4 July 1998)
Nicolae Ceaușescu	1918 – 1989	Romanian communist politician and dictator.	TBA
Ivan Ceresnjes (also vica Ceresnjes)	1945 – Present	Bosnian architect-researcher. Recognised for Service carried out by the Benevolencija and the Sarajevo Jewish communities throughout the war.	TBA (ceremony - 12 October 1994)
Clifford Chadderton	1919 – 2013	Canadian World War II veteran and chief executive officer of The War Amps	Knight (2004)
Edgar Chahine	1874 – 1947	French painter, engraver, and illustrator of Armenian descent	TBA (1932)
Ingie Chalhoub	1959 – Present	French-Lebanese business executive and fashion designer	Knight (2018)
Cécile Chaminade	1857 – 1944	French composer, noted female recipient	TBA
Alexandre-Emile Béguyer de Chancourtois	1820 – 1886	French geologist and mineralogist. Known for arranging the chemical elements in order of atomic weights (1862).	TBA (1867)
Jean-Pierre Changeux	1936 – Present	French neuroscientist	Grand Cross (2010)
André Chapelon	1892 – 1978	French engineer	Knight (1934)
Jean-Antoine Chaptal	1756 – 1832	French chemist, physician, agronomist, industrialist, statesman, educator and philanthropist.	Knight (decree: 2 October 1803); Grand Officer (decree: 14 June 1804); Grand Cross (decree: 22 May 1825)
Jean-Martin Charcot	1825 – 1893	French Physician (neurologist) and founder of modern neurology	Knight (decree: 22 April 1858); Officer (decree: 4 April 1880); Commander (decree: 12 January 1892)
Jean Charest	1958 – Present	Canadian politician	Commander (2 February 2009)
Émilie Charmy	1878 – 1974	Painter (France's early avant-garde period). Known for working closely with Fauve artists like Henri Matisse.	Knight (decree: 13 January 1926); Officer (decree: 5 August 1938)
Martin Charteris, Baron Charteris of Amisfield	1913 – 1999	British Army officer and courtier (Queen Elizabeth II)	Grand Officer
Ngô Bảo Châu	1972 – Present	Vietnamese-French mathematician (University of Chicago). Recognised for 14 years of civil service. Known for proving the fundamental lemma for automorphic forms.	Knight
Alexander Chavchavadze	1786 – 1846	Georgian poet, public benefactor and military figure	TBA
René Cheruy	1880 – 1965	Soldier, educator and artist. Known for serving as Auguste Rodin's secretary.	TBA
Ferdinand J. Chesarek	1914 – 1993	United States Army general	TBA
Louis Chevalier	1911 – 2001	French historian	Knight (1958); Officier (1967); Commander (1977)
Gabriel Chevallier	1895 – 1969	French novelist widely. Known for being the author of the satire Clochemerle.	Knight
Julia Child	1912 – 2004	American cooking teacher, author, and television personality	Knight (ceremony: 19 November 2000)
Dezydery Chlapowski	1788 – 1879	Polish general, businessman and political activist. Recognised for his role in the Battle of Tczew.	TBA
Józef Chlopicki	1771 – 1854	Polish general. Recognised for his Heroism at the battle of Epila and the storming of Zaragoza.	TBA
Yang Ho Cho	1949 – 2019	Chairman, Hanjin Group, South Korea	Grand Officer (November 2015)
Yash Chopra	1932 – 2012	Indian film director and producer. (Hindi cinema) Recognised for his efforts to foster the spirit of collaboration between France and India in the field of audiovisual arts.	Officer (5 July 2008)
Charles-Joseph Christiani	1772 – 1840	French Army maréchal de camp (Napoleonic Wars)	Grand Officer (17 May 1813)
Michel Ciment	1938 – 2023	French film critic and magazine editor (Positif)	Knight
Dusan Ckrebic	1927 – Present	Serbian politician and former President	Grand Officer
Jean-Pierre Clamadieu	1958 – Present	French businessman	Knight (decree: 31 December 2005)
Ray Clark		U. S. Army veteran WWII	TBA
Wesley Clark	1944 – Present	United States Army officer (4-star General)	Commander
Eugent Clarke		Jamaican British West Indies Regiment veteran of WWI	Grand Cross
Adolphe Clément-Bayard	1855 – 1928	French entrepreneur and industrialist. Known as a manufacturer of bicycles, pneumatic tyres, motorcycles, motorcars and airships.	Commander (1912)
Laura Clifford Barney	1879 – 1974	American Baháʼí studies teacher and philanthropist	TBA
Pierre Clostermann	1921 – 2006	World War II French fighter pilot	Grand Cross
Martine Clozel	1955 – present	Swiss-french scientist and entrepreneur	Officer
Jacqueline Cochran	1906 – 1980	American pilot and business executive	TBA
Jean Cocteau	1889 – 1963	French poet, playwright, novelist, designer, filmmaker, visual artist and critic.	Commander
Grégoire Coffinières de Nordeck	1811 – 1887	French general	Knight (22 September 1835); Officer (decree: 2 December 1850); Commander (decree: 15 July 1859)
William Anderson Coffin	1855 – 1925	Painter (American landscapes and figures) and art critic (New York Post) Recognised for his charitable work.	TBA (1917)
Daniel Cohen	1953 – Present	French economist and professor (Paris School of Economics)	Knight (11 April 2001)
Frank Cohn	1925 – 2026	American military colonel	Knight
Marthe Cohn	1920 – 2025	French author	TBA (2002)
Colette	1873 – 1954	French author	Knight (1920); Grand Officer (1953)
Jean-Philippe Collard	1948 – Present	French pianist	Knight (January 2003)
Eileen Collins	1956 – Present	NASA astronaut and United States Air Force colonel	TBA
J. Lawton Collins	1896 – 1987	Senior United States Army officer.	Grand Officer
Charles Combes	1801 – 1872	French engineer	Commander (decree: 16 August 1860)
Yves Congar	1904 – 1995	French priest and theologian	TBA
Sean Connery	1930 – 2020	Scottish actor	Knight
Cyril Connolly	1903 – 1974	English literary critic and writer	TBA
Jacinto Convit	1913 – 2014	Venezuela physician and scientist. Recognised for his developing a leprosy vaccine and tropical diseases.	TBA
James T. Conway	1947 – Present	U.S. 4-star General, 34th Commandant of the United States Marine Corps. Recognised for his strategic positioning of the U.S. Marine Corps to confront the problems that both allies face, and a long history of friendship between the two nations.	Commander (2009)
Charles H. Coolidge	1921 – 2021	United States Army technical sergeant	TBA (ceremony: 15 September 2006)
Julian Coolidge	1873 – 1954	American mathematician, historian and a professor	Knight (1919)
Corneliu Coposu	1914 – 1995	Politician (Christian Democratic National Peasants). Known as the Christian Democratic National Peasants' Part founder.	Grand Officer (1995)
William Corbet	1779 – 1842	Anglo-Irish soldier in the service of France.	Knight (TBA); Officer (TBA); Commander (TBA)
Thomas Crombie Cordiner		British Army, Royal Tank Regiment.	TBA
Charles H. Corlett	1889 – 1971	Senior United States Army officer.	Knight (TBA); Officer (TBA)
Doina Cornea	1929 – 2018	Romanian human rights activist and French language professor.	Knight (TBA); Officer (TBA); Commander (TBA)
Peter Cosgrove	1947 – Present	Retired senior Australian Army officer, and former Chief of the Defence Force, who served as the 26th Governor-General of Australia	Knight (TBA); Officer (TBA)
Gérard Coste	1939 – Present	French painter and diplomat.	Knight (TBA)
Pierre Auguste Cot	1837 – 1883	French painter of the Academic Classicism school.	Knight (1874)
Jean Cottier	1912 – 2003	French Civil servant (Diplomat to Washington D.C.) and Business Executive. Known for being the London Chairman of Banque Française du Commerce Extérieur (BFCE).	TBA
Henri du Couëdic de Kerérant	1868 – 1947	Amiral, Commandeur	Knight (24 December 1897); Officier (17 January 1917); Commander (30 April 1921)
Michel du Couëdic de Kerérant	1931 – 2006	Capitaine de Vaisseau	Officer
Georges Courteline	1858 – 1929	French dramatist and novelist	Knight (1899)
Hélène Courtois	1970 – Present	French astrophysicist	Knight (1 January 2020)
Jacques-Yves Cousteau	1910 – 1997	French naval officer, divemaster, oceanographer, filmmaker and author.	
Joëlle Coutaz		French computer scientist. Recognised for her ptoneering work in human-computer interaction (HCI)	Knight (March 2013)
Léon Couturier	1842 - 1935	French painter in the Naturalistic style, who specialized in maritime and military subjects.	Knight (1897)
Robert Cowper	1922 – 2016	Australia Fighter Pilot (World War II). Recognised for his part in the D-Day invasion at Normandy.	TBA (2004)
Edgar William Cox	1882 – 1918	British general and intelligence officer	TBA
Paul Coze	1903 – 1974	French-American anthropologist and artist.	TBA
Austen Crehore	1893 – 1962	World War I pilot in the Armée de l'Air. Recognised for his record serving the French Flying Corps.	Knight (TBA)
Jean Crépin	1908 – 1996	French general	Grand Cross
David Cronenberg		Canadian film director	TBA
Carlos Cruz-Diez	1923 – Present	Venezuelan painter	TBA (2012)
Kenneth Cummins	1900 – 2006	One of the last surviving British veterans of the First World War.	TBA
Andrew Cunningham		1st Viscount Cunningham of Hyndhope	TBA
Ève Curie	1904 – 2007	French and American writer, journalist and pianist. Recognised for her work in UNICEF	Knight (TBA); Officer (July 2005)
Ivan Ćurković	1944 – Present	Serbian sports executive and former footballer who played as a goalkeeper.	Knight (ceremony: 5 October 2005)
Arthur Currie	1875 – 1933	Senior officer of the Canadian Army who fought during World War I	Knight (TBA); Officer (TBA); Commander (TBA)
Piotr Cywiński	1972 – Present	Professional historian and Director of the Auschwitz-Birkenau State Museum. Recognised for his leadership in the field of Holocaust remembrance.	Knight (17 January 2019)
Walerian Czuma	1890 – 1962	Polish general and military commander	Knight (TBA); Officer (TBA); Commander (TBA)
Marion Cotillard	1975 – Present	French actress, film producer, singer, and environmentalist	Knight (14 July 2016)
Yves Crozet		French economist and specialist in transport economics. Recognised for his twenty-five years in the service of higher education and research	Knight (18 April 2014)
Marie-Andrée Castanié		Editor-in-Chief and later general manager of l'Officiel de la Couture	Knight (1962)

== See also ==
- Legion of Honour
- List of foreign recipients of Legion of Honour by name
- List of foreign recipients of the Legion of Honour by country
- List of British recipients of the Legion of Honour for the Crimean War
- Legion of Honour Museum
- Ribbons of the French military and civil awards
- War Cross (France)
