= Hilton Saven =

South African business executive and chartered accountant

- Born: February 1953 (age 72); South Africa
- Occupation(s): Business executive, chartered accountant
- Known for: Chairman of Mazars South Africa

Hilton Saven is a South African business executive and chartered accountant who is the chairman of audit and accounting firm Mazars. He was appointed to the Mazars board as co-CEO in December 2009. He also serves on the governing council of Praxity, a global alliance of independent accounting and auditing firms.

== Career ==
Saven has been with the firm since January 1975 where he started his articles when the firm was called Musikanth Cohen and Fine. He completed his articles with the firm and moved through the ranks to audit manager, and was then appointed as a Partner in January 1981. Saven worked in audit for four years until 1985, at which time he moved across to the consultancy division.

In 1986, Saven was appointed to the executive of the South African practice and became managing partner in 1988. Over the next few years, he was integral in representing Moores Rowland at international level whilst serving on the international Board of Moores Rowland International. In 1994, he assumed the role of Senior Partner of the South African practice.

In September 2007, Moores Rowland integrated with Mazars and became Mazars South Africa, of which Saven is chairman.

== Other activities ==
Outside of Mazars, in 2003, Saven was appointed to the board of Truworths, a large retail company listed on the Johannesburg Stock Exchange, and is currently serving as their non-executive chairman. He has served as a member on a number of external committees for the South African Institute of Chartered Accountants.
