= Clozel =

Clozel is a surname. Notable people with the surname include:

- François Joseph Clozel (1860–1918), French colonial administrator
- Laurent Clozel (born 1953), French mathematician
- Martine Clozel (born 1955), French scientist, entrepreneur
