= Idorsia =

Swiss pharmaceutical research company

Idorsia AG
- Company type: Public company
- Traded as: SIX: IDIA; SPI component
- ISIN: CH0363463438
- Industry: Biotechnology; Pharmaceutical
- Founded: 2017
- Founder: Jean-Paul Clozel, Martine Clozel
- Headquarters: Allschwil, Switzerland
- Key people: Jean-Paul Clozel (CEO), Martine Clozel (Chief Scientific Officer), Guy Braunstein (Chief Medical Officer)
- Products: clazosentan, daridorexant
- Revenue: 828 million CHF (2023)
- Number of employees: > 1200 (2022)
- Website: http://www.idorsia.ch; http://www.idorsia.com

Idorsia is a Swiss pharmaceutical research company in Allschwil, near Basel, Switzerland.

== History ==
After Actelion was bought by Johnson & Johnson in 2017, Idorsia was spun out into a new company and started operating on the same campus where Actelion was founded under the leadership of Actelion founders Jean-Paul Clozel as CEO and Martine Clozel as CSO. The company expects to be profitable in 2025.

In July 2023 due to a disappointing sales ramp-up of the recently approved sleep drug daridorexant, coupled with disappointing trial results in both clazosentan and lucerestat, Idorsia announced layoffs of up to five hundred staff of its one thousand two hundred total employees, to reduce cash burn at its Swiss headquarters by fifty percent. The main shareholder Jean-Paul Clozel provided Idorsia with a private loan of CHF 75 Mio.

In the same month, Idorsia sold its operating businesses in Japan and South Korea to the Japanese firm Sosei Heptares for CHF 400 million. This includes the rights to market clazosentan (Piviaz) and daridorexant (Quviviq) in the Asia Pacific region excluding China, plus rights on two other treatments and up to five clinical-stage programs in Idorsia's pipeline.

== Products ==
Table current as of May 2, 2022, listing the drugs that have reached at least phase 3 trials.

drug	disease, condition, remarks	phase
Daridorexant	Insomnia; First insomnia drug to improve both night-time symptoms and day-time function	Approved in the United States, Switzerland and the EU
Clazosentan	cerebral vasospasm	Approved in Japan
Lucerastat	Fabry disease	Phase 3 failed; research into other applications continuing
Selatogrel	Acute mycardial infarction	Phase 3
