= Dixon Hughes Goodman =

Former American accounting firm

Dixon Hughes Goodman LLP
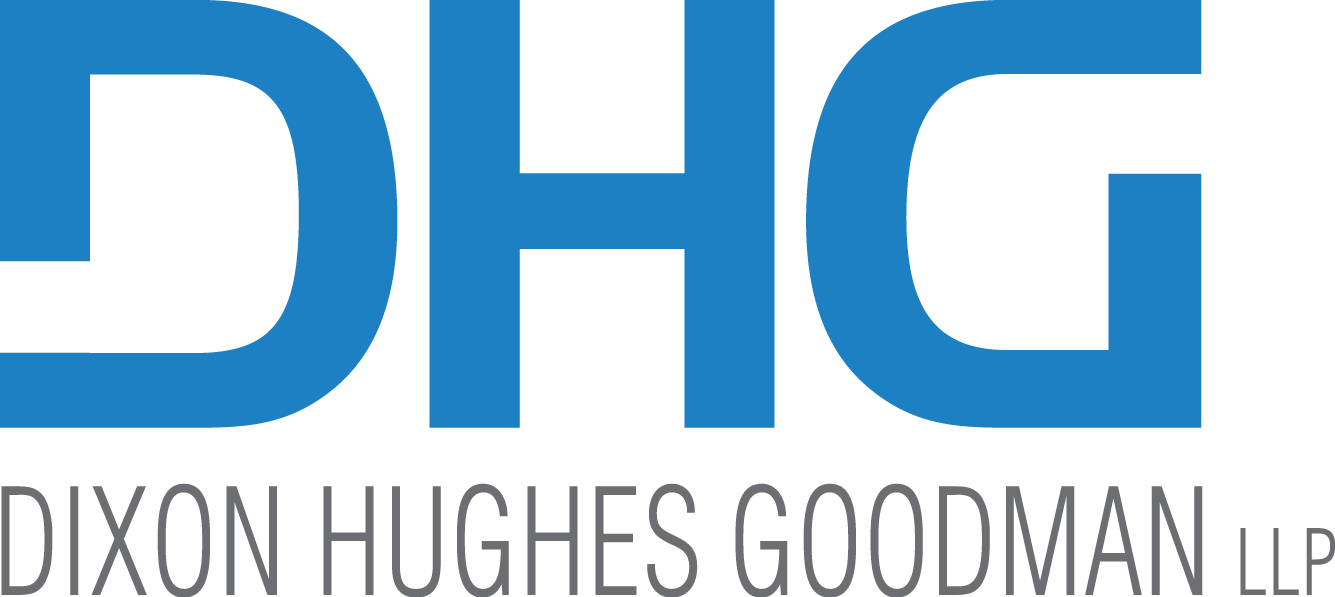
- Type: Limited liability partnership
- Industry: Professional services
- Founded: 1932; M. Lu Goodman; Norfolk, Virginia, United States
- Defunct: June 1, 2022
- Fate: Merged with BKD, LLP
- Successor: Forvis, LLP
- Headquarters: Charlotte, North Carolina, United States
- Key people: Matt Snow (CEO); Michael Crawford (chief operating officer); John Roberts (managing partner, services); Tim York (managing partner, industries)
- Services: Accounting
- Revenue: $338 million (2015)
- Number of employees: More than 2,000

Dixon Hughes Goodman LLP was one of the two predecessor firms that merged to form Forvis, LLP.

DHG was the largest accounting firm headquartered in the Southern U.S. and the 17th largest in the United States. It provided accounting, advisory and tax services to public and private companies. DHG employed more than 2,000 people in thirteen states: Alabama, California, Florida, Georgia, Maryland, New York, North Carolina, Ohio, South Carolina, Tennessee, Texas, Virginia and West Virginia.

Dixon Hughes Goodman was, and Forvis now is, a member of Praxity, an international association of independent firms in the major markets of North America, South America, Europe and Asia. Other firms associated with Praxity included BKD, Moss Adams and Plante Moran.

== History ==
DHG firm name history

- 1932, M. Lu Goodman, Norfolk, VA
- 1945, Goodman, Norman & Company, Norfolk, VA
- 1959, Dixon and Hauser, High Point, NC
- 1961, Dixon Hauser and Odom, High Point, NC
- 1975, Dixon, Odom & Co., High Point, NC
- 1997, Dixon Odom PLLC, High Point, NC
- 2004, Dixon Hughes PLLC, High Point, NC
- 2011, Dixon Hughes Goodman LLP, Charlotte, NC

Dixon Hughes

In 2003, Dixon Odom PLLC and Crisp Hughes Evans LLP, two Southeast regional firms, announced their plans to merge and create a new firm, Dixon Hughes PLLC. The new merger was effective on January 1, 2004. This merger was regarded as one of 2003’s biggest mergers between regional firms.

Dixon Hughes Goodman

As of April 1, 2011, Dixon Hughes merged with Goodman & Company to form Dixon Hughes Goodman LLP.

These mergers resulted in locations in twelve states: Alabama, Florida, Georgia, Maryland, New York, North Carolina, Ohio, South Carolina, Tennessee, Texas, Virginia and West Virginia.

2015 name change and rebrand

As of January 5, 2015, Dixon Hughes Goodman LLP shortened the firm's operating name to DHG. It still legally retains the name Dixon Hughes Goodman LLP and remains a limited liability partnership, but launched a new brand, logo and website using the shortened name "DHG".

Stegman and Company merger

On June 1, 2016, Stegman and Company, the oldest Maryland-based CPA firm, joined Dixon Hughes Goodman. The Baltimore-based location will be a new market for Dixon Hughes Goodman.

Parke, Guptill & Company merger

On November 1, 2016 the California-based Parke, Guptill & Company merged with DHG, expanding the firm's presence to the west coast.

FORVIS merger

On June 1, 2022, DHG merged with BKD, LLC another top 20 accounting firm to form FORVIS and become the newest top 10 public accounting firm.

== Affiliated industries and services ==
=== Industries ===
Agribusiness, Banking, Construction, Dealerships, Education, Energy, Financial Services, Government Contracting, Healthcare, Hospitality & Restaurants, Insurance, Manufacturing & Distribution, Not-for-Profit, Private Client Services, Private Equity, Professional Services, Public Sector & Government, Real Estate, Retail, Technology & Life Sciences, Transportation & Logistics.

=== Services ===
- Attest Services, Audit, Reviews & Compilations, Employee Benefit Plan Audits, Internal Audit Services, International Financial Reporting Standards (IFRS), IT Audit Services, SEC Services, SOC 1 And 2 Services, Statutory Financial Audits.
- Accounting Methods, Cost Segregation, Federal Corporate Tax, Generational Wealth Planning, International Tax, Mergers & Acquisitions, Real Estate, Research & Development Tax Credits, Sales And Use Tax, State & Local Tax, Tax Accounting, Transfer Pricing.
- Forensics, Healthcare Consulting, International Services, IT Advisory, Retirement Plan Administration, Risk Advisory, Transaction Advisory, Valuation Services, Investment Management, Executive Search, Business Support.

== Sponsorship ==
Dixon Hughes Goodman supported organizations such as Junior Achievement, The American Red Cross, United Way and the Boys and Girls Club. DHG offices in Charlotte, NC and Asheville, NC were awarded the Spirit of NC Award by United Way in February 2016.

In fiscal year 2014, the firm donated more than $800,000 via DHG's philanthropic effort DHG Foundation.
