= Marion Créhange =

French computer scientist and professor (1937–2022)

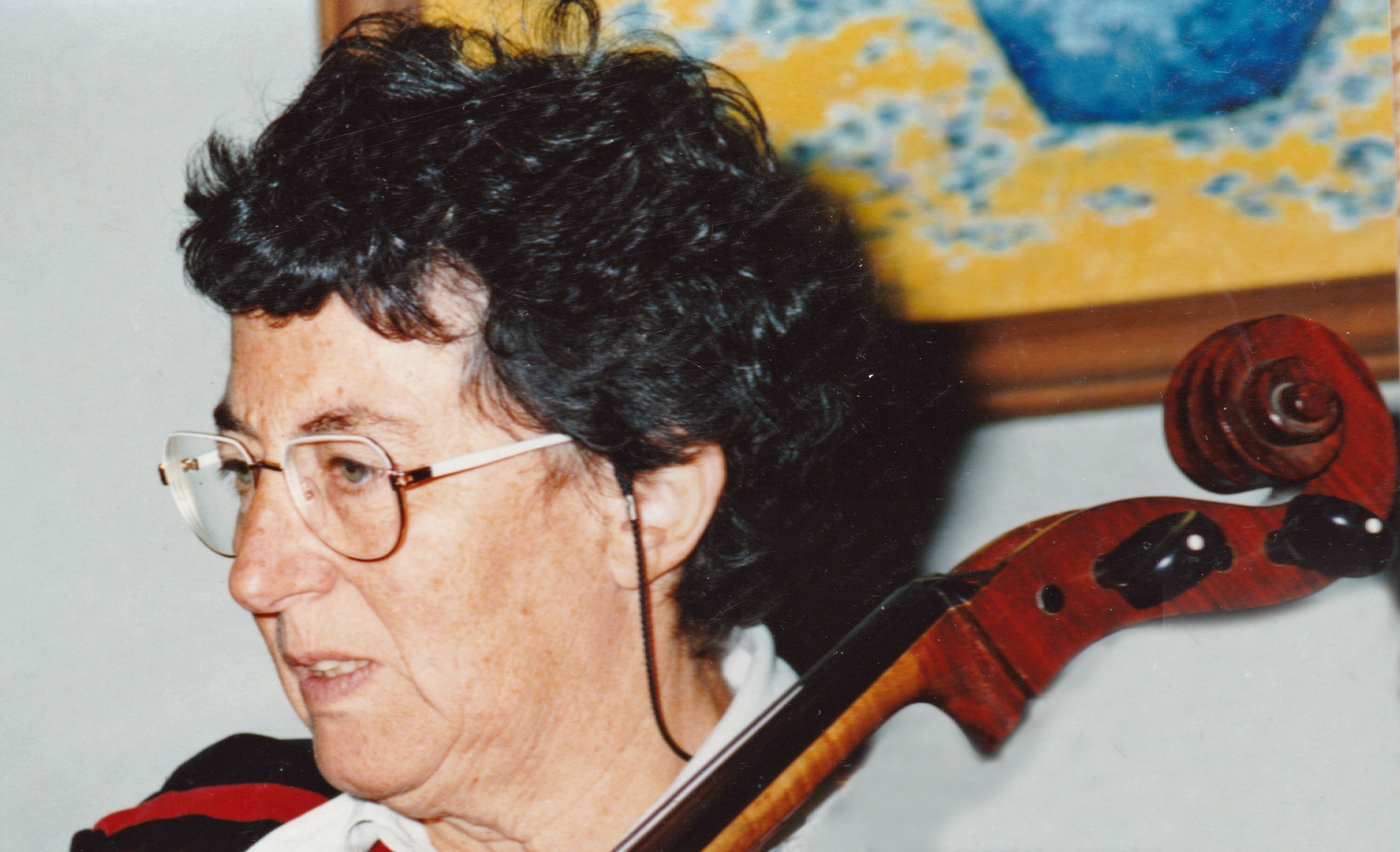
- Créhange playing cello
- Born: Marion Henriette Caen; 14 November 1937; Nancy (France)
- Died: 28 March 2022; Vandœuvre-lès-Nancy (France)
- Resting place: Vandœuvre-lès-Nancy
- Education: Université de Nancy
- Occupations: Computer scientist; professeur des universités
- Employer: Nancy 2 University (1959–1997)
- Awards: Knight of the French Order of Academic Palms
- Scientific career
- Fields: Computer science
- Workplaces: Nancy 2 University (1959–1997)
- Thesis
- Doctoral advisor: Claude Pair, Jean Legras

Marion Créhange (born Marion Caen; 14 November 1937 – 28 March 2022) was a French computer scientist. She was one of the first persons in France to get a PhD in Computer Science in 1961.

A pioneer of computer science at the University of Nancy, she was one of the first to write a PhD in computer science in France in 1961, under the direction of Jean Legras. The title of her thesis is Structure du code de programmation, which deals with the definition and realization of a macro-assembler and a programming tool.

Appointed professor in 1976, she participated in the foundation of the teaching and research unit (UER) of mathematics and computer science at the University Nancy-I. She then turned to the design of database query languages and founded the Exprim (EXPert pour la Recherche d'IMages) research team. She became a member of the Académie de Stanislas in 2017.

Throughout her career, Marion Créhange has been committed to showing the reciprocal contributions between computer science and humanities. She advocates a computer science that promotes imagination and creation.

Her archives were deposited at the end of 2019 at the Henri-Poincaré archives of the University of Lorraine.

== Career ==
Créhange took her doctorate at the University of Lorraine under Jean Legras. It was one of the first Computer Science PhD in France. Her thesis was titled "Structure du code de programmation" ("Structure of programming code") and it improved IBM's Symbolic Optimal Assembly Program by creating a macro-assembler.

Créhange joined the CRIN (Center of Computer Science Research in Nancy) where she specialized in information systems. In 1983, she created the EXPRIM (Experts in Image Research) research group and she became a professor emeritus in the University, in the LORIA research lab.

Her sister Martine Clozel is a prestigious medical scientist and entrepreneur.

Créhange was a member of the Académie de Stanislas.
