= Joseph Cabassol =

French lawyer, politician (1859–1928)

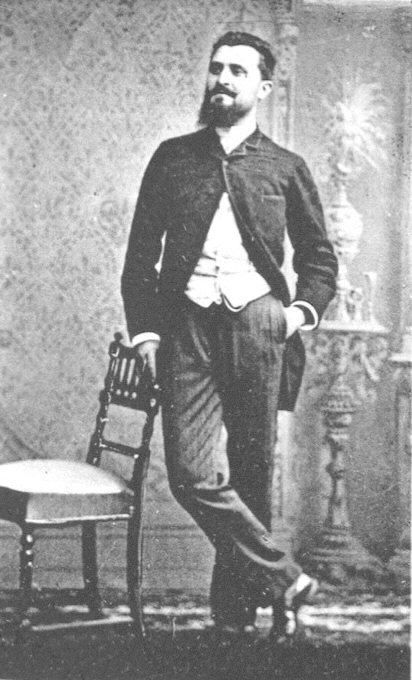
- Born: 21 January 1859; Pourrières, France
- Died: 25 May 1928 (aged 69); Aix-en-Provence, France
- Occupations: Lawyer; Politician
- Spouse: Gabrielle Rose
- Children: Jean Joseph Louis Marie Cabassol; Simone Cabassol; Gabriel Cabassol
- Parent(s): Joseph Philippe Cabassol; Euphrosine Caroline Rose
- Awards: Legion of Honour - Knight

Joseph Cabassol (21 January 1859 – 25 May 1928) was a French lawyer, politician, and banker. He served as the Mayor of Aix-en-Provence from 1902 to 1908.

== Biography ==
=== Early life ===
Joseph Marie Victor Cabassol was born on 21 January 1859 in Aix-en-Provence. His father, Joseph Philippe Cabassol (1828-1855), was a banker who co-founded a small bank with Louis-Auguste Cézanne (1798–1886), the father of renowned painter Paul Cézanne (1839-1906), called the Cézanne and Cabassol Bank, in 1848, until it failed. His mother was Euphrosine Caroline Rose (1833-1855). He was educated in a Catholic school in Aix, and studied the Law at the University of Aix-en-Provence. He received his Doctorate in Law in 1885. He spoke both French and Provençal.

=== Career ===
He started his career as a lawyer in 1880. He served as bâtonnier from 1903 to 1905. He was elected as President of the Court of Appeals of Aix on 12 June 1917 and as its First President on 18 April 1927. In 1919, he served as President of the Société des Amis des Arts, a Freemason order in Aix. Later, he joined the Board of Directors of the local Caisse d'Épargne.

He decided to embark upon a career in politics and joined the Republican Union. He was elected to the General Council of Aix-Sud from 1898 to 1916, serving as its president in 1914. He served as the Mayor of Aix-en-Provence from 1902 to 1908. Under his tenure, he opened the Museum d'Histoire Naturelle Aix-en-Provence, which had been conceived by Antoine Aude (1799-1870), when he served as Mayor in 1835. (It was then located on the Boulevard du Roi René, and it is now housed within the Hotel Boyer d'Eguilles, a listed hôtel particulier located at 5 rue Espariat.) Moreover, he rejected the proposed move of Aix-Marseille University to Marseille, making sure that it would remain in Aix.

He received the Knighthood of the Legion of Honour for his public service.

=== Author ===
He wrote a book of poems, Solitude, and a play, La dernière marquise. Additionally, he published articles in the Gazette du palais and the Répertoire encyclopédique.

=== Personal life ===
In 1886, he married Gabrielle Rose, an extended cousin. They had three children:

- Jean Joseph Louis Marie Cabassol (1887-1916). He died while serving in the First World War.
- Simone Cabassol (1989-1976).
- Gabriel Cabassol (1901-1978).

=== Death and legacy ===
Cabassol died on 25 May 1928 in Aix-en-Provence. The Rue Joseph Cabassol in the Quartier Mazarin in Aix-en-Provence is named in his honour. The Hôtel de Caumont, a listed hôtel particulier, is on this street.

== Bibliography ==
=== Non-fiction ===
- Compte rendu de l’inauguration du buste de Zola (1906)
- Eloge pour sa réception à l’Académie du Dr Philippe Aude (1913)
- Le Parlement d’Aix, défenseur des droits et des traditions de la Provence (1919)
- Charles Giraud, (juriste) sa vie, ses œuvres (1924)

=== Poems ===
- Solitude (1885)

=== Play ===
- La dernière marquise (1923)

== See also ==
- Legion of Honour
- List of Legion of Honour recipients by name (C)
- Legion of Honour Museum

Political offices
| Preceded by Maurice Bertrand | Mayor of Aix-en-Provence; 1902-1908 | Succeeded by Maurice Bertrand |
