= Austen Crehore =

French Naval Officer who invented SCUBA and made the first underwater documentaries

- Born: Austen Ballard Crehore; 9 January 1893; Hackensack, New Jersey
- Died: 20 August 1962 (aged 69); Scotch Plains, New Jersey
- Occupation: pilot
- Spouse: Katherine Dennis (m. 1924; died 1962)
- Children: June Crehore Gulick; Austen Crehore Jr; Thomas Oliver Crehore
- Parents: William Williams Crehore; Anna (Ballard) Crehore
- Awards: Legion of Honour - Knight; War Cross - Two Palms

Sergeant Austen Ballard Crehore (9 January 1893 – 20 August 1962) was a World War I pilot in the Armée de l'Air and the recipient of the Legion of Honor and Croix de Guerre with two palms.

== Early life ==
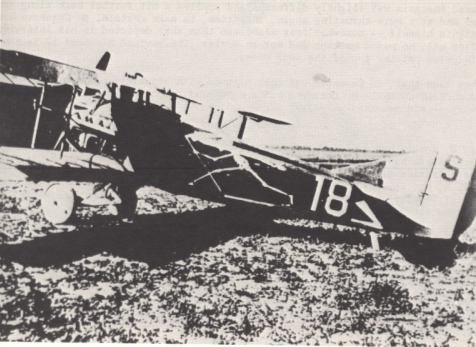

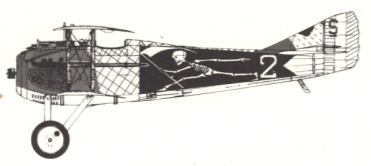

Austen Ballard Crehore was born in Hackensack, New Jersey January 9, 1893, the son of the innovative civil engineer William Williams Crehore, who was responsible for many major engineering innovations in bridge and skyscraper design and construction. (The senior Crehor helped designed 150 Nassau Street in New York City, often called the first true skyscraper.) Crehore's mother was Anna (Ballard) Crehore.

Crehore attended Hackensack Public Schools until March 1, 1917. He tried to enter the US Army Air Service and then the US Naval Aviation. His application was repeatedly rejected by the American Examining Board because of a hearing problem. Crehore refused to take “no” for an answer and shortly after sailed directly for France to join the larger and at the time more established French Air Corps (Armée de l'Air).

== Military career ==
On July 16, 1917, Crehore enlisted in France’s Service Aéronautique Militaire (Armée de l'Air), or Lafayette Flying Corps. He attended French aviation schools from July 21 to July 28, 1917, at Avord, Tours, Pau, and G.D.E. He received his brevet on the Caudron France, September 30, 1917.

Crehore was known for bulldog-like tenacity. Even while suffering with appendicitis he continued to fly until he got his first victory over the enemy, bringing down a German aircraft. Only then did he permit himself any rest or to go to the hospital to have his appendix removed.

Starting December 1, 1917, until the November 1918 armistice, Crehore, badge #8983, served at the front with the Escadrille SPAD 94. They were known as "The Grim Reaper", painting its likeness prominently on the entire side of each of the Squadron 94's planes. Crehore earned verified credit with the downing of two enemy aircraft and was awarded France’s Croix de guerre with two palms for his fine record serving the French Flying Corps during the war. He was later awarded France’s Legion d’Honneur.

Serbian volunteer Lt. Petar (Pierre) Marinovich was Crehore's frequent flying partner and best friend. Marinovich had 22 confirmed shoot downs and credited Crehore with saving his life early in his career as a German plane was on Marinovich's tail, machine gunning it to shreds. Crehore rolled in behind the German and took it out for one of his first confirmed victories over the enemy. Marinovich died in a plane crash in 1919 performing for the king and queen of Belgium after the war.

== Later life ==
On August 26, 1919, after his return from France, Crehore entered the New York to Toronto First International Air Race, promoted by one of New York City's major daily newspapers. He departed Mineola, New York (on Long Island) in an Ansaldo S.V.A. (Ansaldo A.300) and was by far the leader of the first leg of the air race. As he approached the first fuel stop in upstate New York the hordes of onlookers and admirers, not understanding about airplanes, ran out on the airfield as he approached the landing strip to greet the leader. Crehore had no choice but to pull up out of his landing procedure to save the lives of the onlookers, and crashed into a group of trees. The accident nearly killed him and very few of the people present understood that they caused the crash until they read the papers the next day. Crehore spent more than three months recovering from numerous broken bones.

After he was released from the hospital in Albany, he announced that he would retire from flying and concentrate on building the Crehore and Richardson Agency, an insurance and brokerage firm in New York. On January 14, 1924, he married Katherine Dennis in New York City. They had three children, Katherine June Crehore (now June Crehore Gulick), Austen Crehore Jr (died within a few days of birth) and Thomas Oliver Crehore (a playwright).

Crehore continued to develop his company successfully through the Great Depression without difficulty. Years later he sold the Crehore and Richardson Agency to Eifert, French and Company of New York, where he served as President until his retirement in 1960. After that he served as president of the Lafayette Flying Corps Association, and was the director of the American Society of French Legion of Honor.

A resident of Warren Township, New Jersey, Crehore died surrounded by his family in Scotch Plains on August 20, 1962, at age 69. He is buried with his wife Katherine at the Fairview Cemetery in Westfield, New Jersey. His uniform is now part of the permanent collection at the Westfield Historical Society in New Jersey, and his numerous metals and awards are kept at the International Aviation Museum in Colorado.

The Crehore family was a family of very early aviators. Three of his brothers were highly accomplished pilots, and two of his brothers served the US Army Air Service in World War I at the same time as he was serving in the French Air Corps. All the Crehore brothers survived the war.

== See also ==
- Legion of Honour
- List of Legion of Honour recipients by name (C)
- Legion of Honour Museum
- Ribbons of the French military and civil awards
