= Forvis, LLP =

American accounting and advisory firm

Forvis Mazars, LLP
- Type: Limited Liability Partnership
- Industry: Professional services
- Founded: January 2, 1923; 103 years ago
- Key people: Tom Watson, CEO
- Services: Audit, Accounting & Assurance, Consulting, Family Office, International, Investment Banking, Tax, Wealth Management
- Revenue: ▲US$2 billion (2024)
- Number of employees: 7,000 (2024)
- Website: www.forvismazars.us

Forvis Mazars, LLP ranks among the U.S. top 10 public accounting firms, providing assurance, tax, and consulting services. In June 2024, Forvis Mazars Global network was formed between FORVIS and Mazars.

Forvis Mazars is a member of the Praxity group, a global alliance of independent accountancy and consulting firms. Forvis Mazars is the largest member of the Praxity group from the United States. The firm's affiliation with Praxity enables interaction with international clients, as well as provides global support and resources .

== Services ==
Forvis Mazars offers advisory, assurance, audit and tax services, including state and local tax, international tax, real estate cost segregation, transfer pricing, wealth management, employee benefit plans, valuation services, business transition services and information technologies.

== History ==
Forvis Mazars was formed by the merger of two large accounting firms BKD and Dixon Hughes Goodman on June 1, 2022. They announced a new name on April 28, 2022, choosing the name "FORVIS", a combination of "Forward Vision".

=== Baird, Kurtz & Dobson ===
In 1922, three men—William Baird, Wade Kurtz and Claire Dobson—decided to start their own firm with offices in Kansas City and Joplin, Missouri, after the disbandment of the Montgomery Firm, where the three had been employed. On January 2, 1923, the men took the $1,700 they had in the bank and opened their business: Baird, Kurtz & Dobson.

Initially, the firm looked to expand to St. Louis and Chicago, but the 1929 stock market crash and subsequent Great Depression curtailed growth, forcing the firm to build its clientele and reputation in Kansas City and Joplin.

After World War II, a growth period began. A third office opened in Springfield, Missouri, in July 1948, and a uranium boom led the firm to purchase a tax practice in Grand Junction, Colorado.

The 1960s represented a period of significant change. In 1964, the firm drafted its formal partnership agreement, which still exists today. The passage of the Medicare Act in 1965 led the firm to focus on growing its health care practice, which today constitutes the firm's largest industry focus.

Expansion continued throughout the 1970s and 1980s, with the firm opening new offices in Arkansas, Oklahoma, Missouri, Texas, Nebraska and Kentucky.

Since that time, steady growth has continued. The firm created its first wholly owned subsidiary, BKD Corporate Finance, LLC, in 1994 (rebranded to BKD Capital Advisors in 2019) and passed the $100 million revenue mark in 1999. The firm created its charitable arm, the BKD Foundation, in 1999; since making its first charitable gift in February 2000, the foundation has given more than $14 million to qualifying 501(c)(3) organization. In recent years, BKD has been known to play an active role in the charities "Fighting Hunger... Feeding Hope." and the Ronald McDonald House.

The firm undertook its second largest merger in 2001, combining with Olive LLP to create BKD, LLP, which was the eighth-largest U.S. accounting firm at the time. That year also marked a name change for BKD Investment Advisors, founded in 1998, to BKD Wealth Advisors, LLC.

On October 1, 2013 BKD officially acquired Malin Bergquist & Co, LLP, a firm that was previously based in Erie, Pennsylvania.

As of November 1, 2014, Wolf & Company officially became a part of BKD through the result of a merger.

In 2015, BKD launched women's initiatives, sales training that spanned the entire firm, and a national enterprise risk solutions practice.

In 2016, the firm claimed 41 offices in 19 states, including Arkansas, Colorado, Illinois, Indiana, Iowa, Kansas, Kentucky, Minnesota, Mississippi, Missouri, Nebraska, New York, Ohio, Oklahoma, Pennsylvania, Tennessee, Texas, and Utah, making it one of the largest accounting firms in the United States.

== Initiatives ==
FORVIS Foundation — The FORVIS Foundation was the firm's charitable arm. It aimed to enrich the communities FORVIS serves through financial donations and volunteerism. The foundation supported not-for-profit organizations of many types and sizes, including several FORVIS clients and organizations, with firm partners and employees serving in volunteer roles. The FORVIS Foundation made its first donation in 2000 and has contributed more than $14 million to date.

SKY Initiative — SKY was a firmwide BKD initiative to emphasize and strengthen diversity that initially focused on attracting, retaining and developing women leaders in the firm. The goal of SKY was to identify and remove cultural barriers and biases that prevent employees from realizing their potential.

== Acquisitions ==
Schmidt Westergard & Company, PLLC joined BKD January 16, 2022. Schmidt Westergard & Company, PLLC was a firm based in Mesa, Arizona.

CampbellWilson joined BKD June 1, 2020. CampbellWilson was a firm based in Dallas, Texas.

Teegardin & Associates CPAs joined BKD June 1, 2019. Teegardin was an Austin-based firm specializing in tax, accounting and family office services.

Stayner Bates P.C. joined BKD June 1, 2019. Stayner Bates was a firm based in Salt Lake City, Utah,

Loeb & Troper LLP joined BKD July 15, 2018. Loeb & Troper was a firm specializing in audit and consulting for the health care, not-for-profit and education industries. The New York-based firm kept its same location.

Rylander, Clay & Opitz, LLP (RCO) joined BKD June 1, 2018. Rylander, Clay & Opitz was a Fort Worth-based firm offering a variety of accounting and consulting services for clients across a broad range of industries—added to BKD's existing offices in Texas including Dallas, Houston, San Antonio and Waco.

Harper & Pearson Company, P.C. joined BKD January 9, 2018. Already the eighth-largest accounting firm in Houston, BKD gained additional staff and clients from the purchase. Some of Harper & Pearson's staff joined BKD's office at 2800 Post Oak Boulevard.

Paragon Audit & Consulting, Inc. joined BKD June 1, 2017. Paragon, a Denver-based firm specializing in internal audit and compliance, is helping grow the capabilities of BKD's National Advisory Services Region and BKD National Enterprise Risk Solutions Practice.

Kiesling Associates LLP joined BKD December 4, 2016. The Des Moines-based firm strengthened BKD's presence in the Midwest and added industry knowledge in the telecommunications industry.

Peterson, Peterson & Goss joined BKD December 1, 2015. This Wichita-based firm expanded BKD's market presence in the Midwest.

== Subsidiaries ==
FORVIS Capital Advisors, LLC – the firm's investment banking arm that provided services including mergers, acquisitions, company sales and divestitures, debt and equity recapitalization, strategic planning and select transactions.

FORVIS Wealth Advisors, LLC – An independent wealth management firm registered with the SEC that offered services for affluent individuals and their families and boasting more than $4 billion in assets under management.

== Divisions ==
- BKD Technologies – Offering information technology solutions
- Enterprise Risk Solutions – Services to help address operational, financial, strategic, regulatory and technology risks and controls
- Forensics & Valuation Services – Business valuation, forensics and fraud investigation services
- Loan Review Services – Helping financial institutions assess loan portfolio quality and repayment risk of selected borrowers
- State & Local Tax (SALT) Services
- International Tax Services
