= Joëlle Coutaz =

French computer scientist

- Education: Joseph Fourier University
- Known for: Human-computer interaction, user interface plasticity, multimodal interaction, software engineering
- Awards: Legion of Honour - Knight (2013)
- Scientific career
- Workplaces: University of Grenoble

Joëlle Coutaz is a French computer scientist, specializing in human-computer interaction (HCI). Her career includes research in the fields of operating systems and HCI, as well as being a professor at the University of Grenoble. Coutaz is considered a pioneer in HCI in France, and in 2007, she was awarded membership to SIGCHI. She was also involved in organizing CHI conferences and was a member on the editorial board of ACM Transactions on Computer-Human Interaction.

== Career ==
In 1970, Coutaz received her PhD in computer science from Joseph Fourier University in Grenoble, France, where she specialized in operating systems. She then worked as a software engineer for French National Center for Scientific Research (CNRS). In 1972, she worked on the first packet switching network at the University of Grenoble, and later became an assistant professor for the university until 1991. She was a visiting scientist at Carnegie Mellon University from 1983 to 1984.

Coutaz's research interests shifted from operating systems to human-computer interaction after attending a CHI conference in 1983. She would then become a pioneer in HCI in France, by bridging the domain with software engineering. In 1988, she obtained her Thèse d'Etat in human-computer interaction from Joseph Fourier University. Then in 1991, she became a full professor at University of Grenoble.

In 1990, Coutaz founded and directed CLIPS, an HCI group at the Laboratory of Informatics in Grenoble. She co-founded two groups part of the CNRS national programme on computer-supported cooperative work and multimodal HCI. Furthermore, she became the co-chief editor of the Journal of Interaction between Persons and Systems. Between 1989 and 1995, she contributed to the AMODEUS project by ESPRIT BRA/LTR, whose purpose was to promote a multidisciplinary approach to human-computer interaction. In 2008, Coutaz coordinated a group working on ambient intelligence for the Ministry of Higher Education, Research, and Innovation, with the purpose of confronting societal challenges in novel ways. The group took on the creation of a field that intersects information and communication technologies, and social and human sciences.

As of 2012, she is professor emeritus from the University of Grenoble.

== Research ==
After achieving her PhD in 1970, Coutaz pursued her research interests in operating systems and computer networks. However, her research interests shifted to human-computer interaction in 1983 after attending a CHI conference. In this newer domain, her work focused on software architecture modeling for interactive systems, multimodal interaction, augmented reality, and user interface plasticity. In 1987, she created the presentation-abstraction-control (PAC) model, a software architecture model for interactive systems. In 1993, Coutaz began to work with Laurence Nigay to combine the PAC model with ARCH, a model designed for the implementation of multimodal user interfaces. She has also contributed to projects on a European and national level. Coutaz is currently working on end-user software engineering for smart homes in the field of ubiquitous computing.

=== FAME ===
From 2001 to 2004, Coutaz contributed to FAME at Karlsruhe Institute of Technology. The goal of the project was to create an intelligent agent which could facilitate communication between people of different cultures when solving a common problem. Their solution made use of multimodal interactions, including vision, speech, and object manipulation to create and manipulate new information based on the context.

=== CAMELEON ===
CAMELEON's purpose was to build methods and environments which support the design and development of context-dependent interfaces. They focused on methods which would promote the creation of software interfaces that are usable on various devices.

=== CONTINUUM ===
Between 2008 and 2011, Coutaz contributed to CONTINUUM. The project addressed the problem of service continuity within the long-term vision of ambient intelligence, and defined models that support service continuity for mobile users. Three key scientific issues were addressed: context management and awareness, semantic heterogeneity, and human control versus system autonomy.

=== UsiXML (ITEA) ===
From 2009 to 2012, Coutaz contributed to UsiXML by Information Technology for European Advancement (ITEA 2). UsiXML is a markup language for user interfaces, in which UI can be designed at different levels of abstraction.

=== AppsGate ===
Between 2012 and 2015, Coutaz contributed to AppsGate. Their goal was to create software that would allow non-engineers to create their own programs for their environment. With the rise of IoT, their focus was on programmable smart home devices.

== Publications ==
Coutaz has authored over 130 publications, including two books, in the domain of human-computer interaction:-

=== Books ===
- Bass, L. J., & Coutaz, J. (1991). Developing software for the user interface. SEI Series in Software Engineering, Addison-Wesley, pp. I-XIV, 1–255.
- Coutaz, J. (1990). Interfaces homme-ordinateur: Conception et réalisation. Dunod informatique.

=== Journals & Conference Papers ===
- Laurillau V., Coutaz J., Nguyen V. B., Calvary G., & Llerena D. (2021) "Objective Evaluation of Subjective Metrics for Interactive Decision-Making Tasks by Non-experts" Human-Computer Interaction – INTERACT 2021: 18th IFIP TC 13 International Conference, Bari, Italy pp.384–403.
- Laurillau V., Nguyen V.-B., Coutaz J., Calvary G., Mandran N., Camara F., & Balzarini R. (2018) "The TOP-slider for multi-criteria decision making by non-specialists" NordiCHI '18: Proceedings of the 10th Nordic Conference on Human-Computer Interaction pp.642–653.
- Coutaz J., & Crowley J. L. (2017) "Evaluation of programmable domestic eco-systems: "living in it" as an experimental method" IHM '17: Proceedings of the 29th Conference on l'Interaction Homme-Machine pp.157–168.
- Coutaz, J. & Crowley, J. (2016) "A First-Person Experience with End-User Development for Smart Homes", IEEE Pervasive Computing 15(2A) p.26–39
- Coutaz J., Demeure, A. Caffiau, S., Crowley, J. L. (2014) "Early lessons from the development of SPOK, an end-user development environment for smart homes" UbiComp '14 Adjunct: Proceedings of the 2014 ACM International Joint Conference on Pervasive and Ubiquitous Computing: Adjunct Publication pp.895–902.
- Fontaine E., Demeure, A., Coutaz, J., & Mandran, N., (2012) "Feedback on KISS, a smart home development tool by the end user", Ergo'IHM '12: Proceedings of the 2012 Conference on Ergonomie et Interaction homme-machine, pp.153–160
- Coutaz, J., & Calvary, G. (2012). "Human-Computer Interaction and Software Engineering for User Interface Plasticity". In Jacko, J. A. (Eds.), "Human computer interaction handbook: Fundamentals, evolving technologies, and emerging applications" (pp. 1195–1214). Boca Raton, FL: CRC Press.
- Coutaz, J., Crowley, J. L., Dobson, S., & Garlan, D. (2005). "Context is key" Communications of the ACM, 48(3), p. 49-53.
- Calvary, G., Coutaz, J., Thevenin, D., Limbourg, Q., Bouillon, L., & Vanderdonckt, J. (2003). "A unifying reference framework for multi-target user interfaces" Interacting with computers, 15(3), p. 289-308.
- Thevenin, D., & Coutaz J. (1999). "Plasticity of User Interfaces: Framework and Research Agenda" Interact, 99, p. 110-117.
- Nigay, L., & Coutaz, J. (Eds.). (1993). "A design space for multimodal systems: concurrent processing and data fusion" Proceedings of the INTERACT'93 and CHI'93 conference on human factors in computing systems New York City, NY: ACM.

== Awards ==
- In 2013, Coutaz was awarded in knighthood in France's Legion of Honour.
- In 2013, she received the IFIP TC13 Pioneer Award for outstanding contributions to the educational, theoretical, technical, commercial, or professional aspects of analysis, design, construction, evaluation and use of interactive systems.
- In 2013, she became an honorary member of Société Informatique de France.
- In 2007, she received an Honorary Degree of Doctor of Science from the University of Glasgow.
- In 2007, she was awarded membership to SIGCHI for substantial contributions to the field of Human-Computer Interaction.
- In 2024, she received an Honorary Degree of Doctor of Engineering Technology from Hasselt University.

== See also ==
- Legion of Honour
- List of Legion of Honour recipients by name (C)
- Legion of Honour Museum
