= Oyster Point Pharma =

Pharmaceutical company

Coordinates: 40.678631°N 78.243038°W

Oyster Point Pharma, Inc.
- Company type: Subsidiary
- Traded as: Nasdaq: OYST
- Industry: Biotechnology
- Founded: 2015
- Defunct: January 2023
- Fate: Acquired
- Successor: Viatris
- Headquarters: Princeton, New Jersey, United States
- Key people: Jeffrey Nau (president and CEO)
- Owner: Viatris
- Website: oysterpointrx.com

Oyster Point Pharma was an American biopharmaceutical company based in Princeton, New Jersey, focusing on the development of pharmaceutical therapies to treat ophthalmic diseases. It was acquired by Viatris in 2023.

== History ==
The company was founded in 2015.

In October 2021, Tyrvaya was the first nasal spray approved by Food and Drug Administration to treat dry eye syndrome. This became the company's lead product.

Prior to going public, Oyster Point Pharma operated at a loss of $16.5 million in 2018.

In February 2019, still at clinical stage, the company raised $93 million in its Series B funding round.

In October 2019, the company issued 5-million shares in the initial public offering with NASDAQ Global Select Market at the price of $16 per share with the first trading day on October 31. In January 2023 Viatris acquired Oyster Point Pharma in an all-cash deal.
