= Grégoire Coffinières de Nordeck =

French general (1811–1887)

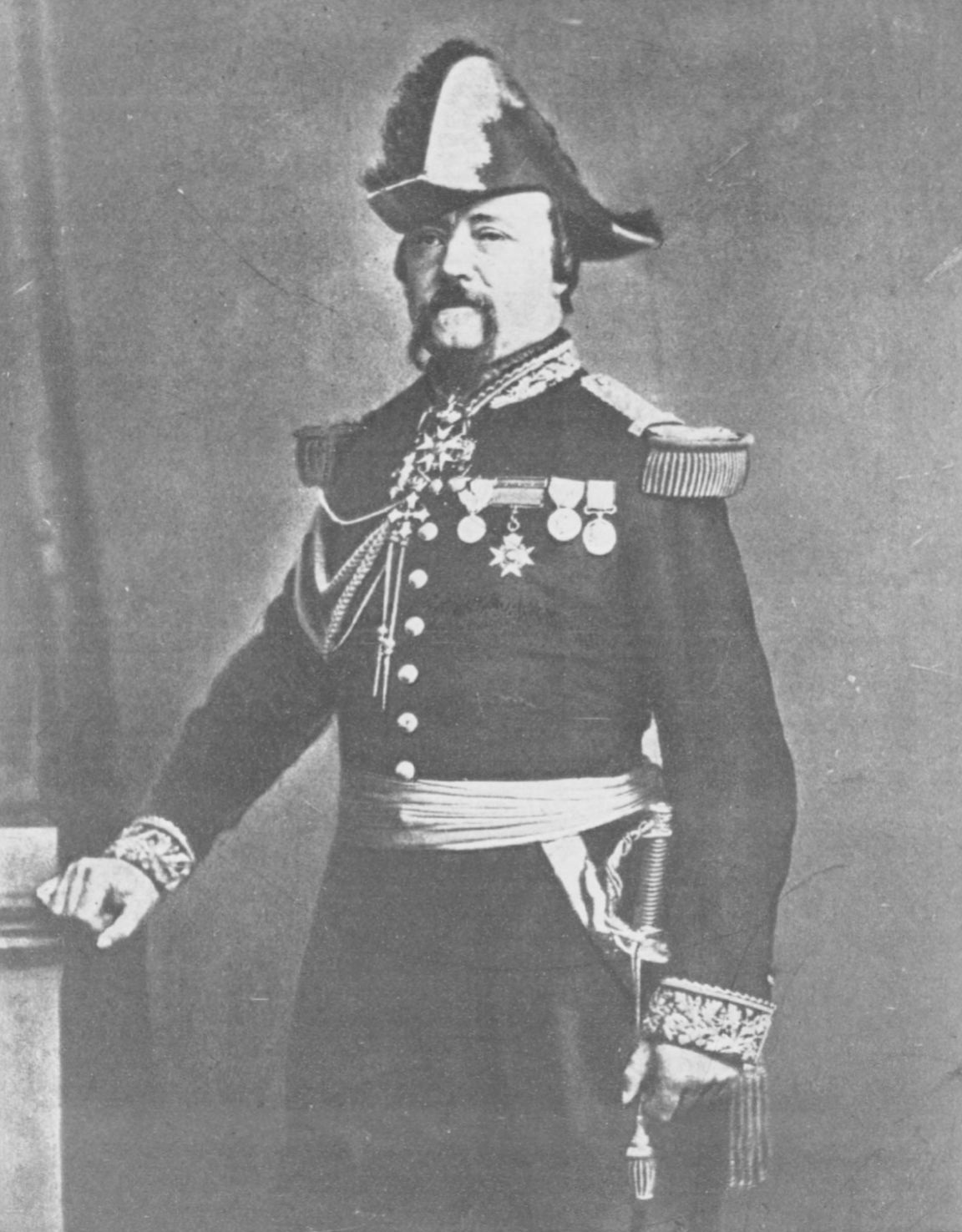
- General Coffinières (undated photograph)
- Born: September 2, 1811; Castelnaudary, France
- Died: January 7, 1887 (aged 75)
- Allegiance: French
- Awards: Legion of Honour – Commander (1859)

Grégoire Gaspard Félix Coffinières, later Coffinières de Nordeck (2 September 1811, in Castelnaudary – 7 January 1887) was a French general. He was commander of the École Polytechnique during the Second French Empire. During the Franco-Prussian War in 1870, he commanded the fortifications of Metz, which he surrendered without defending them.

== Biography ==
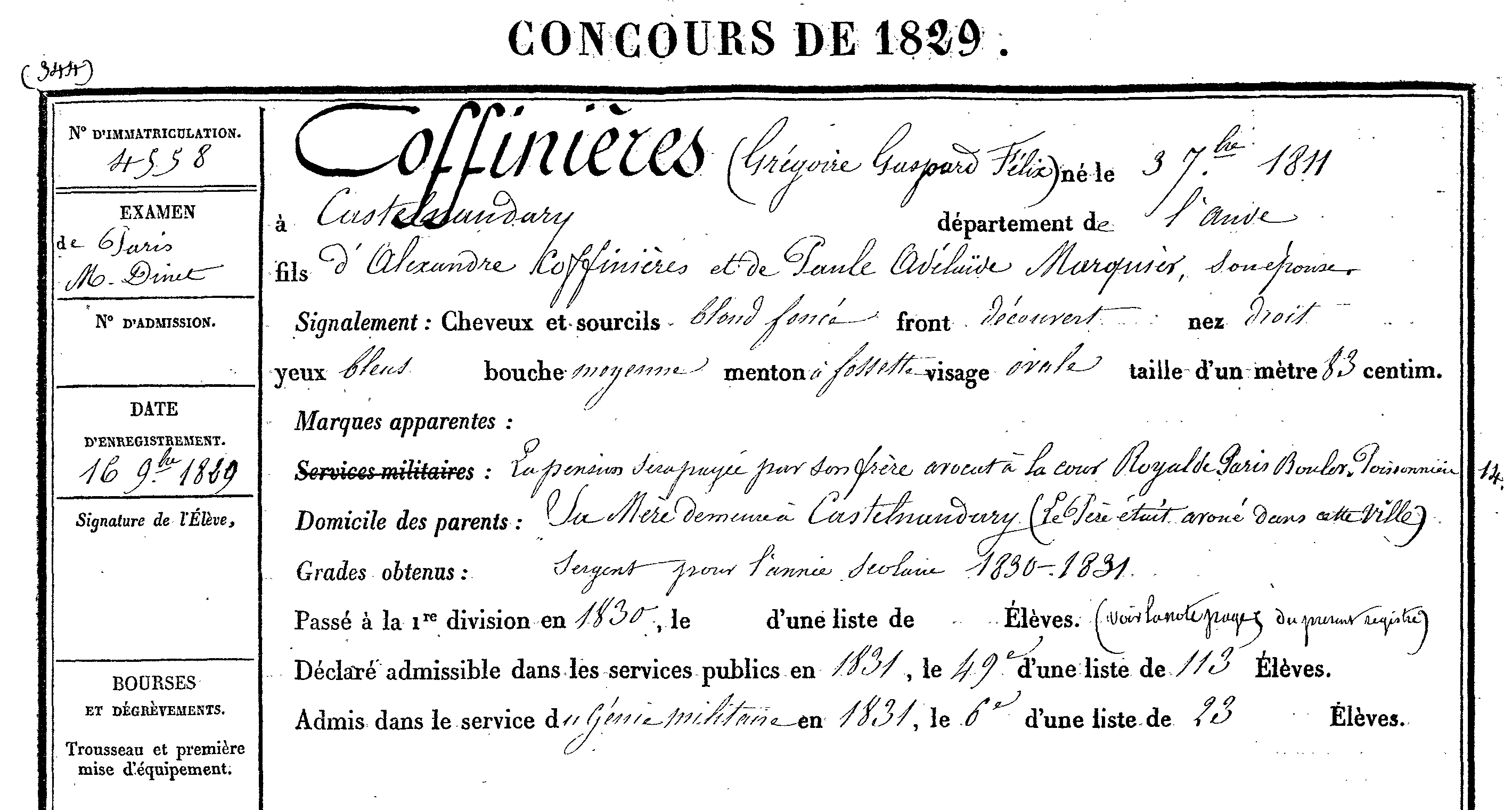
Coffinières's student record at the École Polytechnique

Grégoire Coffinières was the son of Alexandre Coffinières, a lawyer in Castelnaudary in the Aude department, and of Paule Adélaïde Marquier.

In 1829 he passed the entry exam of the École polytechnique, where as a student he took part in the Three Glorious Days of the revolution of July 1830. Graduating in 1831, 49th in a class of 113, he chose to become a combat engineer.

He attended the École d'application du Génie at Metz, and was then sent to Algeria. Returning to France in 1837, he embarked on the 1844 expedition to Morocco.

Appointed head of engineers at Auch in 1845, Coffinières returned to Morocco in 1849. He then left for Argentina, where he created the first map of the La Plata Basin in 1850. Then a lieutenant colonel, he based the map on "documents collected in situ and the best partial plans of that region".

In 1855, he participated in the Crimean War, where he took part in the siege of Sevastopol and was promoted to Brigadier General.

Coffinières succeeded General Charles Eblé in the command of the École polytechnique from 1860 to 1865, in which year he was promoted to Divisional General. During the Franco-Prussian War, he served as superior commander of the fortifications of Metz. His conduct in this command is controversial, and he was later accused of surrendering the position without defending it. Coffinières sought to shift his responsibility on General François Achille Bazaine, although he had sole responsibility for the fortifications of Metz. When Bazaine was later tried for treason, the name of Coffinières was often cited at his trial.

Coffinières was captured and interned at Hamburg. Freed after the war, he left active duty in 1876 and retired in 1881. He died in 1887.

== Awards ==
By imperial decree of 2 November 1864, Coffinières was authorized to add de Nordeck, a name from his family's maternal branch, to his last name.

By decree on 22 September 1835, he became a Knight of France's Legion of Honour, later being promoted to Officer (decree: 2 December 1850), and then finally to the rank of Commander (decree: 15 July 1859).

== Sources ==
- Dictionnaire de Biographie Française, vol. 9, Paris, 1961
- Roger Martin, Coffinières de Nordeck, in Jean Tulard (ed.), Dictionnaire du Second Empire, Paris, Fayard, 1995, ISBN 2-213-59281-0, p. 311.
