= Clazosentan =

Chemical compound

Clinical data
- Trade names: Pivlaz
- ATC code: C04AX33 (WHO)

Legal status
- Legal status: In general: ℞ (Prescription only)

Identifiers
- IUPAC name: 5-methyl-pyridin-2-sulfonic acid{6-(2-hydroxy-ethoxy)-5-(2-methoxy-phenoxy)-2-[2-(1H-tetrazol-5-yl)-pyridin-4-yl]-pyrimidin-4-yl}amide
- CAS Number: 180384-56-9
- PubChem CID: 6433095
- DrugBank: DB06677
- ChemSpider: 4938283
- UNII: 3DRR0X4728
- KEGG: D11664
- ChEMBL: ChEMBL109648
- CompTox Dashboard (EPA): DTXSID60170955

Chemical and physical data
- Formula: C_{25}H_{23}N_{9}O_{6}S
- Molar mass: 577.58 g·mol^{−1}
- 3D model (JSmol): Interactive image
- SMILES: CC1=CN=C(C=C1)S(=O)(=O)NC2=C(C(=NC(=N2)C3=CC(=NC=C3)C4=NNN=N4)OCCO)OC5=CC=CC=C5OC
- InChI: InChI=1S/C25H23N9O6S/c1-15-7-8-20(27-14-15)41(36,37)32-24-21(40-19-6-4-3-5-18(19)38-2)25(39-12-11-35)29-22(28-24)16-9-10-26-17(13-16)23-30-33-34-31-23/h3-10,13-14,35H,11-12H2,1-2H3,(H,28,29,32)(H,30,31,33,34); Key:LFWCJABOXHSRGC-UHFFFAOYSA-N

Clazosentan (INN, brand name Pivlaz) is a drug belonging to the class of endothelin receptor antagonists.

== Mechanism ==
The endothelin 1 receptor is one of the strongest known vasoconstrictors. After subarachnoidal bleedings, irritation of the blood vessels can lead to a vasospasm and thus to an ischaemia, an insufficient blood supply to brain tissue. One possible effect of this is, in turn, an ischaemic stroke.

== Trials ==
In a randomized trial with patients who had aneurysmal subarachnoid bleeding and were being treated with endovascular coiling, 15 mg/h clazosentan significantly reduced vasospasm-related morbidity and all-cause mortality. Clazosentan, however, did not improve the neurological outcome as measured by the extended Glascow Outcome Scale.
