= Patrick de Cambourg =

- Born: 1949 (age 76–77)
- Education: Paris Institute of Political Studies (1971)
- Occupations: Chartered accountant, auditor
- Known for: Chairman of Mazars Group; President of Autorité des Normes Comptables

Patrick de Cambourg (born in 1949) is honorary chairman, and the former chairman of the Mazars Group.

== Biography ==
Graduate of the Paris Institute of Political Studies in 1971, with degrees in literature, government and civil law, a chartered accountant and auditor, Patrick began his career with Mazars in 1974 at the age of 24.

He became a partner in 1978, and chairman of Mazars in 1983. He is a member of a variety of committees among the organisations of his profession (French National Institute of Chartered Accountants, French National Institute of Statutory Auditors, National Accounting Council, FEE), and also participated in the Le Portz Committee on network ethics.

De Cambourg is honorary chairman of the Mazars Group.

In February 2015, the Finance Committee of French Senate approved the nomination (as proposed by the president of the French Republic, François Hollande) of de Cambourg for the presidency of the French standard-setting authority (Autorité des Normes Comptables – ANC). The Finance Committee of the French National Assembly also approved the nomination.

== Honour ==
- Knight of the Legion of Honour
- Commander of the National Order of Merit

== Publications ==
- Corporate Accountability and Trust. Thoughts from 12 Top Managers (Published by Economica in 2006) ISBN 2-7178-5359-6
- Intangible Capital (Published by Maxima)
- Profit and Business (Published by Delmas)
