= Martine Clozel =

- Born: December 27, 1955
- Occupation(s): Scientist, entrepreneur
- Known for: Co-founder of Actelion and Idorsia

Martine Clozel (born 27 December 1955) is a scientist, entrepreneur and co-founder of Actelion and Idorsia.

== Education and career ==
Clozel studied at the University of Nancy and the University of California in San Francisco. She also attended further training in physiology and pharmacology at McGill University.

In 1997, she founded Actelion with her husband Jean-Paul Clozel. The company was sold in 2017 to the American pharmaceutical and consumer products company Johnson & Johnson for US$30 billion. Martine Clozel founded the pharmaceutical company Idorsia in 2017 and has since served as head of research. She is one of the most successful female company founders in Switzerland.

Martine Clozel is the sister of Marion Créhange, a computer scientist who was the first woman to receive a computer science PhD and one of the first world-wide.

== Awards ==
- Officer of the Legion of Honour
- Doctor honoris causa from EPFL
- Prix Suisse Award
