= Forvis Mazars =

Audit, accounting and consulting firm

Forvis Mazars Global Limited
- Industry: Professional services
- Founded: 1945
- Headquarters: Paris, France (Forvis Mazars Group SC); Springfield, MO (Forvis Mazars LLP)
- Key people: Hervé Hélias (Chair of the Forvis Mazars Global Network Board); Pascal Jauffret (CEO of Forvis Mazars Group); Tom Watson (CEO of Forvis Mazars LLP)
- Services: Audit, Chartered accountant, Consulting, Taxation, Corporate finance, Financial advisory, Legal
- Revenue: ▲$5.19 billion (Aug 2024)
- Number of employees: 40,000
- Website: forvismazars.com

Forvis Mazars is an international audit, accounting and consulting business formed in June 2024 by an agreement between Mazars and Forvis. Combined, the firms operate in the US and over 100 other countries, being among the top 10 global audit firms by revenue at the time of the agreement.

== History ==
The original Mazars firm was formed in Rouen, Normandy in France in 1945 by Robert Mazars. He would serve as chief executive officer until 1983, when Patrick de Cambourg was appointed the position. de Cambourg began internationalizing the local firm, which counted 33 employees in 1977. From 2011 to 2016, Philippe Castagnac served as chief executive officer. He was succeeded by Hervé Hélias, who currently holds the position.

In 2023, the US-based Forvis acquired the US operations of Mazars, and an agreement was reached to operate internationally under the brand Forvis Mazars from June 2024. Subsequently, the firms operate as a network, doing business as Forvis Mazars LLP in the United States and Forvis Mazars Group SC in other countries, with a combined global workforce of over 40,000 in 2024 (7,700 in the US). The two firms are still owned by their respective partnerships, with separate profit pools, but are overseen by a global board.

== Notable clients ==
Since April 2019, US President Donald Trump's attorneys have had an ongoing controversy with a House Oversight and Reform Committee's request for some of the President's financial records which may be in the possession of Mazars USA. On 25 February 2021, the House Oversight Committee in the 117th Congress, reissued the subpoena to Mazars USA for the same documents it had previously sought.

In 2022, following the collapse of FTX, Mazars was engaged by Binance to perform an audit and report on its assets held in reserve. This was later halted following $6 billion of outflows from Binance in December 2022, before Mazars decided to suspend all work with its cryptocurrency-affiliated customers.
