= Frank Cohn =

German-born US Army officer and Holocaust survivor

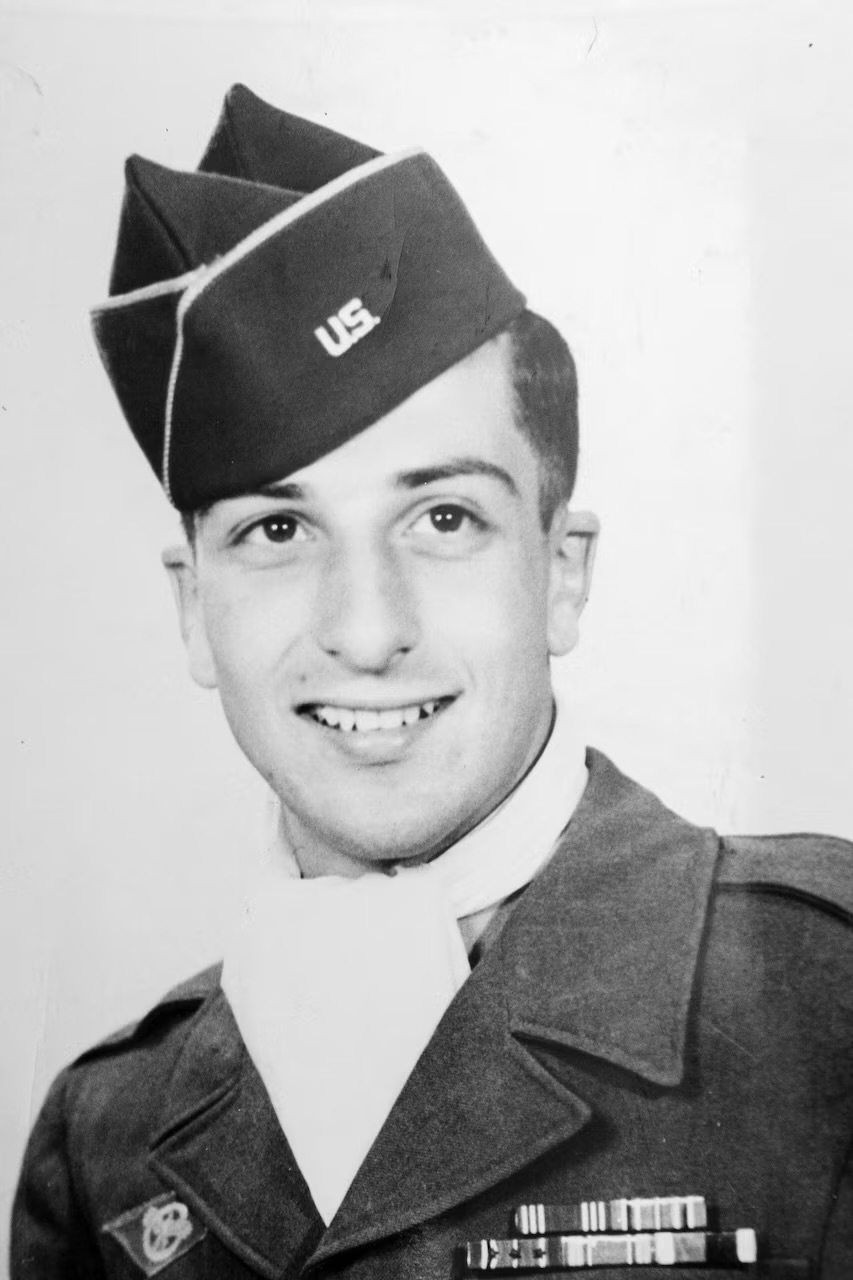
- Official U.S. Army portrait of Cohn in uniform, 1946
- Born: Franz Cohn; August 2, 1925; Breslau, Germany (present-day Wrocław, Poland)
- Died: July 4, 2026 (aged 100); Fort Belvoir, Virginia, United States
- Military career
- Allegiance: United States
- Branch: United States Army
- Service years: 1943–1978
- Rank: Colonel
- Units: 87th Infantry Division; T-Force, 12th Army Group; 26th Infantry Regiment; 1st MP Company, 1st Infantry Division; 728th Military Police Battalion; 7th Army Support Command; 6th Infantry Regiment; Military District of Washington
- Commands: 793rd Military Police Battalion
- Conflicts: World War II; Battle of the Bulge; Korean War; Vietnam War

Franz "Frank" Cohn (August 2, 1925 – July 4, 2026) was a German-born American United States Army colonel, intelligence officer, and Holocaust survivor. Born in Weimar-era Germany, Cohn fled Nazi persecution with his family at 13 years old in 1938. After emigrating to the United States, he was drafted into the U.S. Army during World War II, served in military intelligence during the Battle of the Bulge, and went on to serve a 35-year military career that spanned the Korean and Vietnam Wars, retiring in 1978 as the chief of staff of the United States Army Military District of Washington.

== Early life and personal life ==
Frank Cohn was born Franz Cohn on August 2, 1925, to Jewish parents, his father Martin Cohn and his mother, Ruth Cohn, in Breslau, Germany (present-day Wrocław, Poland). His family owned a sporting goods business in Breslau. Cohn's uncle Max Berdass died in June 1930 from injuries sustained in January 1927 from a beating by Nazis in Chemnitz when they identified him as Jewish. Following the rise to power of Adolf Hitler and the Nazi Party in 1933, the family faced antisemitic harassment, including boycotts of their business and discrimination at school. On April 1, 1933, the Nazi leadership carried out a nationwide economic boycott targeting Jewish-owned businesses, including Cohn's family's sporting goods store.

When Cohn entered third grade in a German public school in 1934, one of his teachers wore a Sturmabteilung (SA) uniform with a swastika armband and the Nazi Party pin. Cohn was forced to listen to his classmates singing Hitler Youth songs and he was instructed to remain seated at his desk, as Jews were forbidden to participate. The brutality of the Nazi regime became a reality for Cohn's family when Michaelis, a family friend, died under unknown circumstances following a Gestapo arrest. In 1938, soon after Cohn's Bar Mitzvah in August, Cohn's father Martin traveled to the United States on a visitor's visa to secure immigration affidavits from relatives. While he was out of Germany, the Gestapo visited the family residence looking for him. Ruth Cohn subsequently obtained a visitor's visa for herself and paid to have Cohn's name added to the document. The two traveled to New York City, where they reunited with Martin on October 30, 1938, prior to the November pogroms known as Kristallnacht. His family was permitted to remain in the United States under an executive order issued by Franklin D. Roosevelt, which halted the return of refugees following Kristallnacht. Cohn attended junior high school and Stuyvesant High School in New York City. Cohn had 18 of his relatives imprisoned in concentration camps during the war: 12 on his father's side of the family; six from his mother's side. After he finished high school, he enrolled in the Reserve Officer Training Corps to learn about the U.S. Army at the City College of New York.

== Military service ==
=== World War II ===
Cohn was drafted into the United States Army in September 1943 at 18 years old. Due to him still holding a German passport, he was initially classified as an "enemy alien", and was held at Fort Dix, New Jersey. He worked on Kitchen Patrol (KP) duty. On his fourth day, all the draftees except him departed for basic training. He was sworn in as a U.S. citizen during his basic training at Fort Benning, Georgia. Three months after the FBI started investigating his background, he reported for the Army Specialized Training Program (ASTP), which, after basic training, sent recruits to colleges to earn degrees in fields like medicine, engineering, and foreign languages. But before Cohn could complete his training, the Army canceled the program.

In September 1944, Cohn deployed to the European Theater of Operations aboard the RMS Queen Mary as an infantry replacement, initially assigned to the 87th Infantry Division and landing at Omaha Beach in Normandy, France, via a Liberty ship. His fluency in the German language and culture was recognized, and the Army transferred him to military intelligence and sent him to Le Vésinet, near Paris, for instruction in identifying German military organization and administrative structures. He served as part of Interrogator Prisoner of War Team 66 within T-Force, an intelligence unit attached to the 12th Army Group. During the Battle of the Bulge, his duties included interrogating captured German soldiers and identifying German infiltrators operating behind American lines in U.S. uniforms.

While searching for German infiltrators wearing American uniforms, Cohn and his officer Captain Remple were riding on a jeep carrying a total of four men. Two of their men dismounted and approached, not showing any rank insignia on their uniforms. A U.S. lieutenant questioned Captain Remple, asking for the fifth general order, the winner of the recent World Series, and the words to "The Star-Spangled Banner." When Remple was unable to answer the questions or finish the anthem, another soldier from their vehicle ran toward them carrying a rifle and called out in a heavy German accent, "Vat goes on here?" When they asked Cohn who stood next to Remple where he was from, he answered in English and stated that he was from Germany. The lieutenant's men mistook their accent for enemy spies, and detained them for seven hours while holding them at gunpoint. In 2020, he recalled the incident as "the scariest day of my life."

He also participated in the Rhineland and Central Europe campaigns, conducting prisoner-of-war interrogations and assessing captured facilities for intelligence materials. In April 1945, Cohn's unit was moving from Frankfurt to Kassel, but was sent to Magdeburg because the Soviet Red Army already reached the east side of the Elbe River. Cohn's captain assigned him to serve as an interpreter during a meeting with Soviet troops to persuade them to maintain their current position rather than advancing to Berlin. Cohn was among the American troops who met the advancing Red Army at the Elbe River near Magdeburg, Germany. According to Cohn, before the Soviet and American troops met at the Elbe River, he only knew one word in Russian: “comrade” (товарищ, romanized: tovarishch). Cohn recalled handing out American cigarettes and receiving vodka in return from the Soviets.

=== Post-war and education ===
During the post-war Allied occupation of Germany, Cohn was assigned to guard suspected war criminals, oversee German prisoners of war, and process captured German documentation for shipment to the United States to support subsequent war crimes trials.

In May 1946, then-Staff Sergeant Cohn was discharged from active duty. While in college, he joined the Army Reserve. During his two years of combat branch service in the infantry, Cohn served with the 26th Infantry Regiment, 1st Infantry Division in Bamberg, Germany, as well as the 6th Infantry Regiment in Berlin. He married Pauline “Paula” Brimberg in 1948, with whom he had one daughter, Laura Cohn. Cohn later transitioned into the Military Police Corps and commissioned as a second lieutenant after graduating from the City College of New York in 1949. He earned a Bachelor of Arts degree in psychology and education from the City College of New York, followed by a Master of Science degree in police administration from Michigan State University.

He subsequently transitioned to military police roles, serving as a platoon leader in the 1st MP Company, 1st Infantry Division, and later as company commander for Company D, 728th MP Battalion in Korea. His later command and staff assignments included provost marshal for the 7th Army Support Command in Germany, battalion commander of the 793rd MP Battalion, chief of operations for the Provost Marshal Office in Vietnam, and commander of the 42nd MP Group (Customs) and Customs Chief for U.S. Army Europe in Heidelberg.

He remained on active duty for 35 years, which included operational deployments during the Korean War, the Vietnam War from February 17, 1969 until February 17, 1970, as well as tours of duty in West Germany. According to his family obituary, while serving as the final O-6 Branch Chief of the Military Police Corps, Cohn sent a letter to the Secretary of the Army expressing concern over the reduction of general officer positions within the branch. Within a few years, six military police colonels were promoted to brigadier general. Toward the end of his career, he served as Director of Security for President Jimmy Carter's inauguration in 1977 and concluded his active duty service as Chief of Staff of the Military District of Washington. He retired from active service in 1978 with the rank of colonel.

== Post-military service and legacy ==
Cohn at the Fairfax Retirement community in Fort Belvoir, Virginia in 2020.

Following his retirement from active duty, Cohn lived in The Fairfax Retirement Community, Fort Belvoir, Virginia. He volunteered and spoke on behalf of several organizations, including the United States Holocaust Memorial Museum, the National Museum of American Jewish Military History, and the Jewish War Veterans of the USA. He also participated in events at the National World War II Memorial in Washington, D.C., where he spoke about his experiences as a refugee and service member. The Russians later honored Cohn's service and invited him to Moscow, all expenses paid, for the 60th, 65th and 70th anniversaries marking the end of World War II in Europe. He received the highest military police award on September 29, 2020, the Order of the Marechaussee. His wife Pauline died in 2021 after 72 years of marriage. The Fairfax County community celebrated Cohn’s 100th birthday on August 2, 2025.

Cohn died on July 4, 2026 on the 250th anniversary of the Declaration of Independence, at his retirement home at The Fairfax military retirement community. A celebration of life was held for Cohn on July 15, 2026, at Adas Israel Congregation in Washington, D.C. Arrangements were made for his final interment with full military honors at Arlington National Cemetery with the official graveside service left pending a date to be announced by the cemetery.

== Awards and honors ==
Cohn's military decorations and foreign honors include the following:

| Row | Decorations and ribbons | | | |
|---|---|---|---|---|
| 1st Row | | | | |
| 1st Row | Legion of Merit (with oak leaf cluster) | Bronze Star Medal | Meritorious Service Medal | Army Commendation Medal |
| 2nd Row | | | | |
| 2nd Row | European–African–Middle Eastern Campaign Medal (with 3 campaign stars) | World War II Victory Medal | Army of Occupation Medal | National Defense Service Medal |
| 3rd Row | | | Legion of Honour | Grand Service Cross |
| 3rd Row | Korean Service Medal | Vietnam Service Medal (with 4 campaign stars) | Legion of Honour (Chevalier, France) | Grand Service Cross (Germany) |
| 4th Row | Republic of Vietnam Campaign Medal | United Nations Korea Medal | Republic of Vietnam Gallantry Cross with palm | — |
| 4th Row | Republic of Vietnam Campaign Medal | United Nations Korea Medal | Republic of Vietnam Gallantry Cross (with palm) | — |

=== Other honors ===
- Order of the Marechaussee – Highest honor awarded by the U.S. Army Military Police Corps
- U.S. Army Military Police Hall of Fame – Inducted in 2004
