= Selatogrel =

P2Y12 inhibitor

Clinical data
- Other names: ACT-246475

Legal status
- Legal status: Investigational

Identifiers
- IUPAC name: [(2R)-3-(4-butoxycarbonylpiperazin-1-yl)-2-[[6-[(3S)-3-methoxypyrrolidin-1-yl]-2-phenylpyrimidine-4-carbonyl]amino]-3-oxopropyl]phosphonic acid
- CAS Number: 1159500-34-1
- PubChem CID: 59534142
- UNII: 6DPK7O4PR7
- ChEMBL: ChEMBL4297589

Chemical and physical data
- Formula: C_{28}H_{39}N_{6}O_{8}P
- Molar mass: 618.628 g·mol^{−1}
- 3D model (JSmol): Interactive image
- SMILES: CCCCOC(=O)N1CCN(CC1)C(=O)[C@H](CP(=O)(O)O)NC(=O)C2=CC(=NC(=N2)C3=CC=CC=C3)N4CC[C@@H](C4)OC
- InChI: InChI=1S/C28H39N6O8P/c1-3-4-16-42-28(37)33-14-12-32(13-15-33)27(36)23(19-43(38,39)40)30-26(35)22-17-24(34-11-10-21(18-34)41-2)31-25(29-22)20-8-6-5-7-9-20/h5-9,17,21,23H,3-4,10-16,18-19H2,1-2H3,(H,30,35)(H2,38,39,40)/t21-,23-/m0/s1; Key:FYXHWMQPCJOJCH-GMAHTHKFSA-N

Selatogrel is a P2Y_{12} inhibitor that has been proposed as a treatment for acute myocardial infarction.
