= Artificial organ =

Engineered organ replacement

An artificial organ is a human-made organ device or tissue that is implanted or integrated into a human – interfacing with living tissue – to replace a natural organ, to duplicate or augment a specific function or functions so the patient may return to a normal life as soon as possible. The replaced function does not have to be related to life support, but it often is. For example, replacement bones and joints, such as those found in hip replacements, could also be considered artificial organs.

Implied by definition, is that the device must not be continuously tethered to a stationary power supply or other stationary resources such as filters or chemical processing units. (Periodic rapid recharging of batteries, refilling of chemicals, and/or cleaning/replacing of filters would exclude a device from being called an artificial organ.) Thus, a dialysis machine, while a very successful and critically important life support device that almost completely replaces the duties of a kidney, is not an artificial organ.

== Purpose ==
Constructing and installing artificial organs, an extremely research-intensive and expensive process initially, may entail many years of ongoing maintenance services not needed by a natural organ:

- providing life support to prevent imminent death while awaiting a transplant (e.g. artificial heart);
- dramatically improving the patient's ability for self care (e.g. artificial limb);
- improving the patient's ability to interact socially (e.g. cochlear implant); or
- improving a patient's quality of life through cosmetic restoration after cancer surgery or an accident.

The use of any artificial organ by humans is almost always preceded by extensive experiments with animals. Initial testing in humans is frequently limited to those either already facing death or who have exhausted every other treatment possibility.

== Examples ==
=== Artificial limbs ===
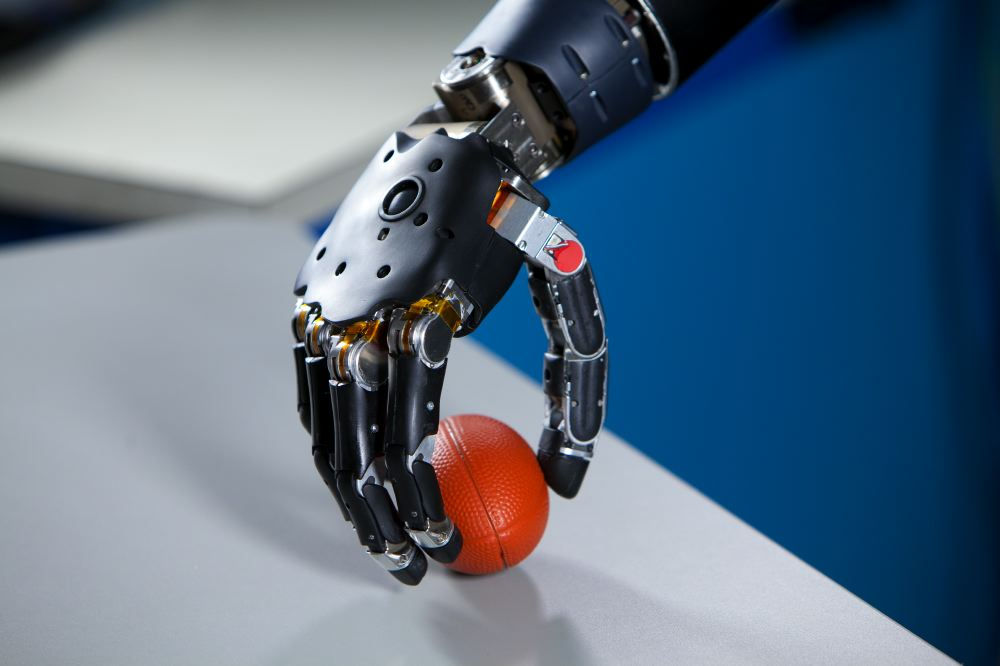
A prosthetic arm

Artificial arms and legs, or prosthetics, are intended to restore a degree of normal function to amputees. Mechanical devices that allow amputees to walk again or continue to use two hands have been in use since ancient times, the most notable one being the simple peg leg. Since then, the development of artificial limbs has progressed rapidly. New plastics and other materials, such as carbon fiber have allowed artificial limbs to become stronger and lighter, limiting the amount of extra energy necessary to operate the limb. Additional materials have allowed artificial limbs to look much more realistic. Prostheses can roughly be categorized as upper- and lower-extremity and can take many shapes and sizes.

New advances in artificial limbs include additional levels of integration with the human body. Electrodes can be placed into nervous tissue, and the body can be trained to control the prosthesis. This technology has been used in both animals and humans. The prosthetic can be controlled by the brain using a direct implant or implant into various muscles.

=== Bladder ===
The two main methods for replacing bladder function involve either redirecting urine flow or replacing the bladder in situ. Standard methods for replacing the bladder involve fashioning a bladder-like pouch from intestinal tissue. As of 2017, methods to grow bladders using stem cells had been attempted in clinical research but this procedure was not part of medicine.

=== Brain ===
A diagram of a hippocampal prosthesis

Neural prostheses are a series of devices that can substitute a motor, sensory or cognitive modality that might have been damaged as a result of an injury or a disease.

Neurostimulators, including deep brain stimulators, send electrical impulses to the brain in order to treat neurological and movement disorders, including Parkinson's disease, epilepsy, treatment resistant depression, and other conditions such as urinary incontinence. Rather than replacing existing neural networks to restore function, these devices often serve by disrupting the output of existing malfunctioning nerve centers to eliminate symptoms.

Scientists in 2013 created a mini brain that developed key neurological components until the early gestational stages of fetal maturation.

=== Corpora cavernosa ===
To treat erectile dysfunction, both corpora cavernosa can be irreversibly surgically replaced with manually inflatable penile implants. This is a drastic therapeutic surgery meant only for men who have complete impotence resistant to all other treatment approaches. An implanted pump in the groin or scrotum can be manipulated by hand to fill these artificial cylinders, normally sized to be direct replacements for the natural corpora cavernosa, from an implanted reservoir in order to achieve an erection.

=== Ear ===
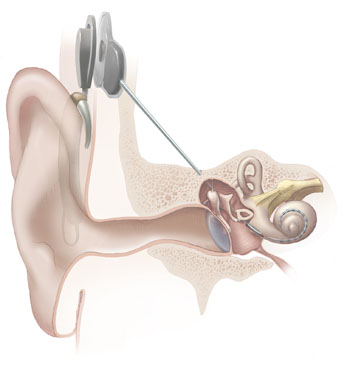
An illustration of a cochlear implant

In cases when a person is profoundly deaf or severely hard of hearing in both ears, a cochlear implant may be surgically implanted. Cochlear implants bypass most of the peripheral auditory system to provide a sense of sound via a microphone and some electronics that reside outside the skin, generally behind the ear. The external components transmit a signal to an array of electrodes placed in the cochlea, which in turn stimulates the cochlear nerve.

In the case of an outer ear trauma, a craniofacial prosthesis may be necessary.

Thomas Cervantes and his colleagues, who are from Massachusetts General Hospital, built an artificial ear from sheep cartilage by a 3D printer. With a lot of calculations and models, they managed to build an ear shaped like a typical human one. Modeled by a plastic surgeon, they had to adjust several times so the artificial ear can have curves and lines just like a human ear. The researchers said, "The technology is now under development for clinical trials, and thus we have scaled up and redesigned the prominent features of the scaffold to match the size of an adult human ear and to preserve the aesthetic appearance after implantation." Their artificial ears have not been announced as successful, but they are still developing the project. Each year, thousands of children are born with a congenital deformity called microtia, where the external ear does not fully develop. This could be a major step forward in medical and surgical microtia treatment.

=== Eye ===
A bionic eye

The most successful function-replacing artificial eye so far is an external miniature digital camera with a remote unidirectional electronic interface implanted on the retina, optic nerve, or other related locations inside the brain. The present state of the art yields only partial functionality, such as recognizing levels of brightness, swatches of color, and/or basic geometric shapes, proving the concept's potential.

Various researchers have demonstrated that the retina performs strategic image preprocessing for the brain. The task of creating a completely functional artificial electronic eye is even more complex. Advances towards tackling the complexity of the artificial connection to the retina, optic nerve, or related brain areas, combined with ongoing advances in computer science, are expected to dramatically improve the performance of this technology.

=== Heart ===
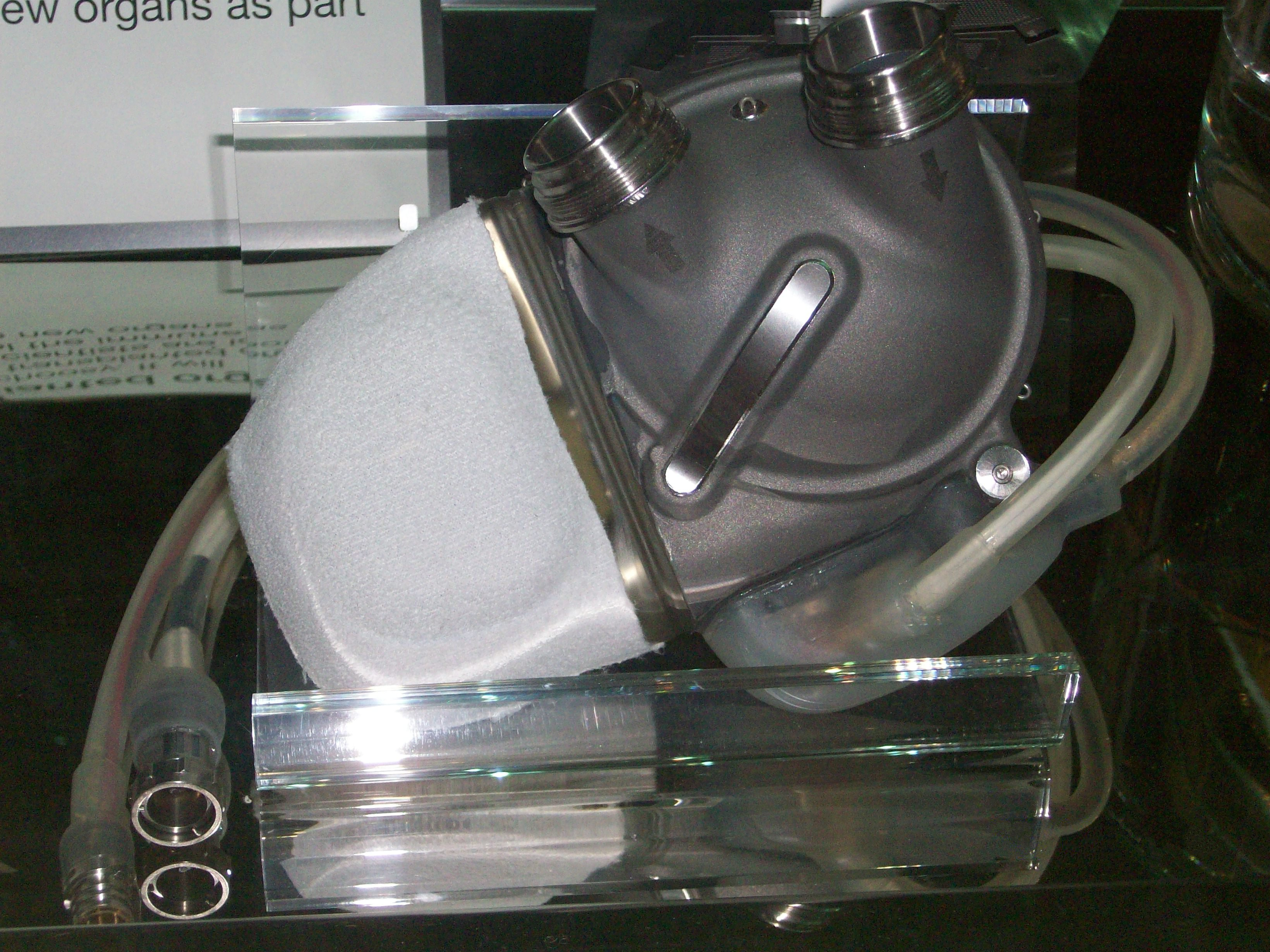
A ventricular-assist device

Cardiovascular-related artificial organs are implanted in cases where the heart, its valves, or another part of the circulatory system is in disorder. The artificial heart is typically used to bridge the time to heart transplantation, or to permanently replace the heart in case heart transplantation is impossible. Artificial pacemakers represent another cardiovascular device that can be implanted to either intermittently augment (defibrillator mode), continuously augment, or completely bypass the natural living cardiac pacemaker as needed. Ventricular assist devices are another alternative, acting as mechanical circulatory devices that partially or completely replace the function of a failing heart, without the removal of the heart itself.

Besides these, lab-grown hearts and 3D bioprinted hearts are also being researched. Currently, scientists are limited in their ability to grow and print hearts due to difficulties in getting blood vessels and lab-made tissues to function cohesively.

=== Liver ===
As of 2008, HepaLife was developing a bioartificial liver device intended for the treatment of liver failure using stem cells. The artificial liver is designed to serve as a supportive device, either allowing the liver to regenerate upon failure, or to bridge the patient's liver functions until transplant is available. It is only made possible by the fact that it uses real liver cells (hepatocytes), and even then, it is not a permanent substitute.

As of 2017, HepaLife is no longer active.

=== Lungs ===
An artificial lung by MC3

With some almost fully functional, artificial lungs are working towards being successful in the near future. An Ann Arbor company MC3 is currently working on this type of medical device.

Extracorporeal membrane oxygenation (ECMO) can be used to take significant load off of the native lung tissue and heart. In ECMO, one or more catheters are placed into the patient and a pump is used to flow blood over hollow membrane fibers, which exchange oxygen and carbon dioxide with the blood. Similar to ECMO, Extracorporeal CO_{2} Removal (ECCO2R) has a similar setup, but mainly benefits the patient through carbon dioxide removal, rather than oxygenation, with the goal of allowing the lungs to relax and heal.

=== Ovaries ===
The ground work for the development of the artificial ovary was laid in the early 1990s.

Reproductive age patients who develop cancer often receive chemotherapy or radiation therapy, which damages oocytes and leads to early menopause. An artificial human ovary has been developed at Brown University with self-assembled micro-tissues created using novel 3D petri dish technology. In a study funded and conducted by the NIH in 2017, scientists were successful in printing 3D ovaries and implanting them in sterile mice. In the future, scientists hope to replicate this in larger animals as well as humans. The artificial ovary will be used for the purpose of in vitro maturation of immature oocytes and the development of a system to study the effect of environmental toxins on folliculogenesis.

=== Pancreas ===
An artificial pancreas is used to substitute endocrine functionality of a healthy pancreas for diabetic and other patients who require it. It can be used to improve insulin replacement therapy until glycemic control is practically normal as evident by the avoidance of the complications of hyperglycemia, and it can also ease the burden of therapy for the insulin-dependent. Approaches include using an insulin pump under closed loop control, developing a bio-artificial pancreas consisting of a biocompatible sheet of encapsulated beta cells, or using gene therapy.

=== Red blood cells ===
Artificial red blood cells (RBC) have already been in projects for about 60 years, but they started getting interest when the HIV-contaminated-donor blood crisis began. Artificial RBCs will be dependent 100% on nanotechnology. A successful artificial RBC should be able to totally replace human RBC, which means it can carry on all the functions that a human RBC does.

The first artificial RBC, made by Chang and Poznanski in 1968, was made to transport Oxygen and Carbon Dioxide, also fulfilled antioxidant functions.

Scientists are working on a new kind of artificial RBC, which is one-fiftieth the size of a human RBC. They are made from purified human hemoglobin proteins that have been coated with a synthetic polymer. Due to the special materials of the artificial RBC, they can capture oxygen when blood pH is high, and release oxygen when blood pH is low. The polymer coating also keeps the hemoglobin from reacting with nitric oxide in the bloodstream, preventing dangerous constriction of the blood vessels. Allan Doctor, MD, stated that the artificial RBC can be used by anyone, with any blood type because the coating is immune silent.

=== Testes ===
Men whom have sustained testicular abnormalities through birth defects or injury have been able to replace the damaged testicle with a testicular prosthesis. Although the prosthetic does not restore biological reproductive function, the device has been shown to improve mental health for these patients.

=== Thymus ===
An implantable machine that performs the function of a thymus does not exist. However, researchers have been able to grow a thymus from reprogrammed fibroblasts. They expressed hope that the approach could one day replace or supplement neonatal thymus transplantation.

As of 2017, researchers at UCLA developed an artificial thymus that, although not yet implantable, is capable of performing all functions of a true thymus.

The artificial thymus would play an important role in the immune system, and it would use blood stem cells to produce more T cells, which in turn, help the body fight infections. It would ultimately give the body a better ability to fight cancer cells. As people age, if their thymus stops working well, an artificial thymus could also be a potentially viable option.

The idea of using T cells to fight against infections has been around for a time, but until recently, the idea of using a T cell source, an artificial thymus is proposed. "We know that the key to creating a consistent and safe supply of cancer-fighting T cells would be to control the process in a way that deactivates all T cell receptors in the transplanted cells, except for the cancer-fighting receptors," said Dr. Gay Crooks of UCLA. The scientist also found that the T cells produced by the artificial thymus carried a diverse range of T cell receptors and worked similarly to the T cells produced by a normal thymus. Since they can work like human thymus, artificial thymus can supply a consistent amount of T cells to the body for the patients who are in need of treatments.

=== Trachea ===
The field of artificial tracheas went through a period of high interest and excitement with the work of Paolo Macchiarini at the Karolinska Institute and elsewhere from 2008 to around 2014, with front-page coverage in newspapers and on television. Concerns were raised about his work in 2014 and by 2016 he had been fired and high level management at Karolinska had been dismissed, including people involved in the Nobel Prize.

As of 2017 engineering a trachea – a hollow tube lined with cells – had proved more challenging than originally thought; challenges include the difficult clinical situation of people who present as clinical candidates, who generally have been through multiple procedures already; creating an implant that can become fully developed and integrate with host while withstanding respiratory forces, as well as the rotational and longitudinal movement the trachea undergoes.

== Enhancement ==
It is also possible to construct and install an artificial organ to give its possessor abilities that are not naturally occurring. Research is proceeding in areas of vision, memory, and information processing. Some current research focuses on restoring short-term memory in accident victims and long-term memory in dementia patients.

One area of success was achieved when Kevin Warwick carried out a series of experiments extending his nervous system over the internet to control a robotic hand and the first direct electronic communication between the nervous systems of two humans.

This might also include the existing practice of implanting subcutaneous chips for identification and location purposes (ex. RFID tags).

== Microchips ==
Organ chips are devices containing hollow microvessels filled with cells simulating tissue and/or organs as a microfluidic system that can provide key chemical and electrical signal information. This is distinct from an alternative use of the term microchip, which refers to small, electronic chips that are commonly used as an identifier and can also contain a transponder.

This information can create various applications such as creating "human in vitro models" for both healthy and diseased organs, drug advancements in toxicity screening as well as replacing animal testing.

Using 3D cell culture techniques enables scientists to recreate the complex extracellular matrix, ECM, found in in vivo to mimic human response to drugs and human diseases. Organs on chips are used to reduce the failure rate in new drug development; microengineering these allows for a microenvironment to be modeled as an organ.

== See also ==
- Artificial bone, skin, uterus, kidney
- Biomechatronics
- Biomedical Engineering
- Decellularization
- List of organs of the human body
- Organoid
- Organ culture
- Organ printing
- Organ transplant
- Tissue scaffold
- Xenotransplant
