= John Francis Fraser =

Scottish-Australian clinician-researcher

John Francis Fraser AO (born 1969) is a Scottish-born Australian intensive care physician, researcher and academic. He is the founder and director of the Critical Care Research Group (CCRG) based at The Prince Charles Hospital and The University of Queensland in Brisbane, Australia. Fraser has held leadership roles in critical care medicine, extracorporeal life support and translational medical research, and is known for his contributions to mechanical circulatory support, extracorporeal membrane oxygenation (ECMO), and international critical care collaborations.

== Early life and education ==
Fraser has described his upbringing as influencing his interest in medicine and research, noting that members of his immediate family were engaged in medical and academic professions. He has stated in interviews that his experiences during his father's terminal illness, when his father was treated in an intensive care unit for respiratory failure, contributed to his perspective on end-of-life care and the role of intensive care medicine.

Fraser has reflected on the importance of patient-centred outcomes in critical care, including considerations of quality of life and end-of-life decision-making in intensive care settings.

Fraser was born in Scotland and graduated with a Bachelor of Medicine and Bachelor of Surgery (MB ChB) from the University of Glasgow in 1991. He subsequently undertook training in anaesthesia and intensive care medicine in the United Kingdom and Australia. In 2010, he completed a Doctor of Philosophy (PhD) at The University of Queensland.

== Research Interests ==
The central aim of Fraser's research is to advance understanding of critically ill patients and improve outcomes through the translation of scientific knowledge into new or enhanced treatment modalities globally.

=== Critical Care Research Group ===
Fraser is Director of the Critical Care Research Group (CCRG) at The Prince Charles Hospital in Brisbane, Australia. The organisation conducts research in critical care medicine, cardiovascular disease, extracorporeal life support, biomedical engineering and translational health sciences. The group includes researchers and clinicians from a range of disciplines and collaborates with healthcare and academic institutions in Australia and internationally. CCRG's research infrastructure includes laboratory facilities and access to preclinical research capabilities through the Queensland University of Technology's Medical Engineering Research Facility.

The Medical Engineering Research Facility supports research and training in medical devices, implants, biomaterials, and surgical equipment and techniques to help make medical procedures safer and more efficient, leading to better health outcomes for patients.

=== Response to COVID-19 pandemic ===
In January 2020, Fraser co-founded the COVID-19 Critical Care Consortium with Gianluigi Li Bassi and Jacky Suen. The consortium established an international clinical registry to collect and analyse data from patients admitted to intensive care units with COVID-19. The project involved collaboration with hospitals and research groups across multiple countries, including participants from the Asia-Pacific Extracorporeal Life Support Organization (APELSO), the SPRINT-SARI network, and the ISARIC network. It also collaborated with national registries, including the Australian ECMO registry (EXCEL).

The consortium was established to support the collection of standardised clinical data on critically ill COVID-19 patients, including those receiving mechanical ventilation and extracorporeal membrane oxygenation (ECMO), in order to inform understanding of disease severity and outcomes in intensive care settings.

=== Heart transplantation ===
Fraser and CCRG participated in the development and clinical evaluation of Hypothermic Oxygenated Perfusion (HOPE), a donor heart preservation technology designed to extend the viability of donor hearts for transplantation. The project, known as the Living Heart Project, involved collaboration with cardiac surgeons and researchers including David McGiffin and David Kaye.

=== ICU of the Future ===
Together with Dr Oystein Tronstad, Fraser founded the ICU of the Future in 2022. The Prince Charles Hospital in Brisbane opened the ICU of the Future bedspaces with a two-bed trial in which patients will benefit from reduced noise levels, a more natural light cycle to give a clearer sense of time and enhance circadian rhythm, and increased tech connectivity with families.

Critical illness survivors increasingly experience long-term physical, cognitive, and psychological impairments following discharge from intensive care, a cluster of conditions commonly referred to as post-intensive care syndrome (PICS), a term introduced in 2012 to describe these outcomes. Reported prevalence of such impairments varies, with some studies estimating that they affect up to 60% of survivors, and they are recognised as a significant public health issue. Research into post-intensive care recovery has highlighted ongoing challenges including variability in patient outcomes, limitations in current terminology and phenotyping, and the need for improved outcome definitions. Proposed priorities for future research include improved expectation management, enhanced patient and caregiver support, better integration between hospital and community-based care, and the development of more contemporary and interdisciplinary study designs incorporating both quantitative and qualitative methods.

== Fellowships and Qualifications ==
- 2021: Fellow, Extracorporeal Life Support Organization
- 2018: Australian Society of Medical Research Clinical Research Award
- 2016: Fellow, Royal College of Physicians and Surgeons, Glasgow
- 2010: Fellow, College of Intensive Care Medicine of Australia & New Zealand
- 2010: Doctor of Philosophy, The University of Queensland
- 2002: Fellow, Joint Faculty of Intensive Care Medicine, Australia & New Zealand College of Anesthetists & Royal Australian College of Physicians
- 2000: Fellow, Faculty of Intensive Care Australia & New Zealand College of Anaesthetists
- 1998: Fellow, Royal College of Anaesthetists
- 1998: Fellow, Faculty of Anaesthetists Royal College of Surgeons in Ireland (now FCARCSI)
- 1997: Member, Royal College of Physicians United Kingdom
- 1996: Diploma in Anaesthetics, Royal College of Anaesthetists United Kingdom
- 1991: Bachelor of Medicine, Bachelor of Surgery, University of Glasgow Scotland

== Awards, Honours and Positions Held ==
In 2025, Fraser was appointed an Officer of the Order of Australia (AO) for "distinguished service to medicine as an intensive care physician and researcher, and for contributions to global critical care research."

=== Other awards and positions held include ===
- 2025: Mentor Award, Cardiovascular Alliance, Excellence in Cardiovascular Research Awards
- 2024: Co-President, International ECMO Network
- 2024: Director, Queensland representative, Australian Cardiovascular Alliance
- 2023: Advisory Board Member, Intensive Care Medicine Experimental
- 2023: Metro North Researcher of the Year, The Prince Charles Hospital Staff Excellence Awards
- 2023: Inaugural MedTech Ambassador, Brisbane Economic Development Agency (BEDA)
- 2022: Honorary Research Fellow, Australian Red Cross Lifeblood
- 2022: Affiliate Membership, Translational Research Institute
- 2021: Meritorious Contributions to Delivery of Extracorporeal Support, Extracorporeal Life Support Organization
- 2004: Founder and Director, Critical Care Research Group, The Prince Charles Hospital, The Institute for Molecular Bioscience
- 2012: Director Intensive Care Unit, St Andrew's War Memorial Hospital, UnitingCare
- 2010: Adjunct Professor, Institute for Molecular Bioscience, The University of Queensland
- 2010: Adjunct Professor, School of Medicine & Dentistry, Griffith University
- 2012: Honorary Adjunct Professor, School of Medicine, Bond University
- 2009: Adjunct Professor, School of Public Health and Social Work, Faculty of Health, Faculty of Engineering, QUT
- 2005: Adjunct Clinical Professor, Central Clinical School, Monash University

== Personal life ==
John Fraser lives in Brisbane, Australia. He has five children, Ben, Dominic, Nicholas, Lucy, and Tommy. His Belfast-born grandmother was one of the first women to qualify as doctor in Northern Ireland.
