= Abiomed =

Medical devices company based in Danvers, Massachusetts, U.S.

Abiomed, Inc.
- Formerly: Applied Biomedical Corporation (at founding)
- Type: Subsidiary
- Traded as: Nasdaq: ABMD
- Industry: Medical devices
- Founded: 1981; 45 years ago
- Founder: David Lederman
- Headquarters: Danvers, Massachusetts, U.S.
- Key people: Andrew Greenfield (president); Thorsten Siess (EVP and CTO); Chuck Simonton (EVP and CMO)
- Products: Cardiovascular medical implant devices
- Revenue: ▲US$1.032 billion (2022)
- Operating income: ▼US$140.7 million (2022)
- Net income: ▼US$136.5 million (2022)
- Total assets: ▼US$976.5 million (2022)
- Total equity: ▲US$1.503 billion (2022)
- Number of employees: 2,003 (2022)
- Parent: Johnson & Johnson (2022–present)
- Website: abiomed.com

Abiomed, Inc. is a medical device technology company that operates as a stand-alone business within Johnson & Johnson's MedTech Segment. Abiomed develops and manufactures temporary external and implantable mechanical circulatory support devices. The company is headquartered in Danvers, Massachusetts with additional offices in Woburn, Baltimore, Berlin, Aachen, and Tokyo.

Andrew Greenfield is President of the company, with Dr. Thorsten Siess as Executive Vice President and Chief Technology Officer and Dr. Chuck Simonton as Executive Vice President and Chief Medical Officer. According to Bloomberg, the company "engages in the research, development, and sale of medical devices to assist or replace the pumping function of the failing heart. It also provides continuum of care to heart failure patients".

As of 2022, the company had secured five FDA approvals and 1,408 patents with 1,416 pending. For fiscal year 2022, Abiomed reported $1.032 billion in revenue and reported diluted earnings per share was $2.98 for the year.

On December 22, 2022, Johnson & Johnson completed the acquisition of Abiomed.

== History ==
Abiomed was founded in Danvers, Massachusetts by David M. Lederman in 1981 as Applied Biomedical Corporation. That year, the company commenced the development of an artificial heart. Funded by federal research grants, Lederman partnered with The Texas Heart Institute to develop the AbioCor, a grapefruit-sized electromagnetic device with an internal battery that completely replaces the heart without wires or tubes passing through the skin. In July 2001, AbioCor became the first artificial heart successfully implanted in a patient, where it pumped more than 20 million times. Fourteen of the AbioCor devices were implanted, during clinical trials from 2001 to 2004, with the longest-living recipient surviving 512 days. The AbioCor won FDA approval in 2006 for patients who are near death and do not qualify for a heart transplant.

In 2004, Michael R. Minogue became president and CEO of Abiomed. In 2005, Abiomed purchased ventricular assist device company Impella CardioSystems AG of Aachen, Germany, maker of the Impella heart pump, developed by Thorsten Siess, who is now the chief technology officer at Abiomed. After Abiomed acquired Impella the company's focus shifted from heart replacement to heart recovery.

In July 2014, Abiomed acquired German heart pump maker ECP in a deal worth up to $30 million. The deal included a nearly $2.8 million buyout of AIS GmbH Aachen Innovative Solutions, which owns some of the patents licensed to ECP.

In May 2018, Abiomed was added to the S&P 500 index. During the S&P's rise from 2000 to 3000, Abiomed was the index's top performing stock.

In 2018, Abiomed built a $17 million Innovation Center to facilitate research and product development at its headquarters in Danvers. The 29,800-square-foot facility features laboratories for blood, optical, software, mechanical and electrical research, plus a production line.

In 2019, Barron's ranked Abiomed the fourth best publicly listed company of the 2010s, with total return of 1,983%. while Fortune ranked Abiomed 19th on the magazine's list of 100 fastest-growing companies.

In April 2020, Abiomed acquired medical device company Breethe, a startup that spun out of the University Of Maryland. The startup had developed a portable extracorporeal membrane oxygenation (ECMO) system that acts like an artificial lung, oxygenating and removing carbon dioxide from the blood of a patient in cardiogenic shock or respiratory failure. The technology, now known as the Abiomed Breethe OXY-1 System, received FDA 510(k) clearance later that year.

In June 2020, Abiomed appointed Charles A. Simonton, MD, as vice president and Chief Medical Officer. Also in 2020, the FDA granted Emergency Use Authorization for the Impella heart pump to stabilize COVID-19 patients following the removal of pulmonary blood clots, as well as the use of the Impella in combination with the Breethe extracorporeal membrane oxygenation (ECMO) system, which pumps more oxygen into the bloodstream.

In February and April 2021, Abiomed appointed neurosurgeon Myron Rolle and cardiologist Paula Johnson to the board of directors. Drs. Rolle and Johnson serve on the Governance and Nominating Committee and Regulatory and Compliance Committee of the board.

In June 2021, Abiomed acquired preCARDIA, a catheter developer whose system allows for a less-invasive option when treating acute decompensated heart failure (ADHF) patients.

In November 2022, Abiomed announced that it would be acquired by Johnson & Johnson in a $16.6 billion deal. The deal closed on December 22. Following the acquisition, Abiomed continues to operate as a standalone business within Johnson & Johnson's MedTech segment.

== Technology ==
Impella is the world's smallest heart pump. It sits in the heart, spinning up to 50,000 revolutions per minute, sending blood throughout the body, allowing the heart to rest and recover. It is inserted through a minimally invasive procedure and guided through an artery to the heart. In 2007, the Impella 2.5 heart pump was among 35 healthcare products to receive a 2007 Medical Design Excellence Award. As of 2022, the Impella heart pump products include the Impella 2.5, Impella 5.0, Impella CP with SmartAssist, Impella 5.5 with SmartAssist, Impella RP with SmartAssist and Impella Connect, which gives providers 24/7 secure access to Impella status data in the cloud for Impella-supported patients.

The Abiomed Breethe OXY-1 System is an extracorporeal membrane oxygenation (ECMO) system that pumps, oxygenates and removes carbon dioxide from blood of patients suffering from cardiogenic shock or respiratory failure due to ARDS, H1N1, SARS and COVID-19 among other causes. It can be used alone or in conjunction with the Impella heart pump.

Since 2005 when Abiomed acquired the Impella technology, the heart devices have received a series of FDA approvals. Notably, in 2015, Abiomed received FDA approval to use the Impella 2.5 heart pump during elective and urgent high-risk percutaneous coronary intervention procedures. The FDA approval was based on the PROTECT II randomized controlled trial, which found high-risk percutaneous coronary intervention (PCI) patients who underwent PCI with Impella had fewer major adverse events at 90 days (although statistically non-significant), compared to patients who underwent PCI with the intra-aortic balloon pump (IABP). In 2016, the Impella RP system became the first percutaneous single-access heart pump designed for right-heart support to receive FDA approval.

There is a lack of data from randomized controlled trials for Impella devices in cardiogenic shock, despite calls from the medical community. While early studies suggested short term benefits, propensity-matched analyses comparing the Impella device with intra-aortic balloon pump (IABP) showed no benefit for clinically relevant outcomes such as mortality. This may be partly due to increased risk of bleeding and peripheral vascular complications with the Impella device. Some studies have even suggested an increased risk of mortality with Impella devices, compared to the intra-aortic balloon pump (IABP), with an additional expense of >$50,000 at 30 days. There are currently no adequately powered randomized controlled trials of the Impella device for clinically relevant outcomes such as mortality.

In 2021, the FDA granted pre-market approval to the Impella RP with SmartAssist, a first single-access, dual-sensor technology device to provide temporary percutaneous ventricular support for patients with acute right heart failure or decompensation after implanting a left ventricular assist device, myocardial infarction, heart transplant or open-heart surgery. The FDA also granted breakthrough device designation for its smallest heart pump, the Impella ECP, which measures only 3mm in length.

In April 2022, Abiomed's Impella Bridge-to-Recovery (BTR) minimally-invasive heart pump was successfully implanted in the first patient treated with the device as part of an early feasibility study. In August 2022, results from the Restore EF study were published in The Journal of the Society of Cardiovascular Angiography and Interventions. The study demonstrated that Impella-supported high-risk percutaneous coronary intervention (PCI) led to significant improvements in left ventricular ejection fraction (LVEF), angina symptoms, and heart failure symptoms at the 90-day follow-up. In October 2022, the FDA granted pre-market approval to the Impella RP Flex with SmartAssist for treatment of acute right heart failure for up to 14 days.

== Leadership ==
Andrew Greenfield is Abiomed's President since the company was acquired by Johnson & Johnson in December 2022. He succeeded Michael R. Minogue who retired after serving as chairman, President and CEO since 2004 when Abiomed's founder, David Lederman, had stepped down.

== See also ==
- Thoratec (St. Jude Medical)
