= Extracorporeal procedure =

Medical procedure which is performed outside the body

An extracorporeal procedure is a medical procedure which is performed outside the body. Extracorporeal devices are the artificial organs that remain outside the body while treating a patient. Extracorporeal devices are useful in hemodialysis and cardiac surgery.

== Circulatory procedures ==
A procedure in which blood is taken from a patient's circulation to have a process applied to it before it is returned to the circulation. All of the apparatuses carrying the blood outside the body are collectively termed the extracorporeal circuit.

Blood component modification:

- Intra-surgical cell salvage (aspiration, washing and autotransfusion) - to salvage usable blood cells
- Apheresis - separation of blood components
  - Plasmapheresis vs cytapheresis (separate out plasma or cells)
  - centrifugal apheresis vs filtration apheresis vs adsorption
  - cascade apheresis

Blood purification:

- Hemoadsorption/Hemoperfusion - removes specific toxins or pathogens from whole blood using an adsorbent
- Plasma adsorption - removes specific toxins or pathogens from plasma (separated via apheresis) using an adsorbent
- Aquapheresis - removes excess water and salt
- Renal replacement therapy - replacing the failing kidney
  - Hemodialysis - using osmosis
  - Hemofiltration - using filtration
  - Hemodiafiltration - using both
  - Continuous renal replacement therapy (CRRT) - doing so continuously
- Liver support system - replaces/supplements the liver
- Biospleen and other extracorporeal bionic or non bionic spleen-like blood cleansing device

Breathing (oxygenation / removal of CO2):

- Cardiopulmonary bypass (heart-lung machine) during open heart surgery
- Extracorporeal carbon dioxide removal
- Extracorporeal membrane oxygenation (ECMO) - a machine that replaces/supplements the lungs' function of oxygenation and CO2 removal
  - Extracorporeal cardiopulmonary resuscitation - CPR plus ECMO

== Other procedures ==
Extracorporeal shockwave lithotripsy (ESWL), which is unrelated to other extracorporeal therapies, in that the device used to break up the kidney stones is held completely outside the body, whilst the lithotripsy itself occurs inside the body.

Extracorporeal bone sterilization, where a large bone with a tumour is removed and has all its cells killed to result in a dead bone autograft, onto which normal bone cells may regrow.

- Extracorporeal radiotherapy / extracorporeal bone irradiation, where the bone is given a dose far exceeding what would otherwise be safe to give to a patient.
- Additional methods include boiling (regular and autoclaved), pasturization, and liquid nitrogen freezing.

Extracorporeal pulsatile circulatory control (EPCC) is a process by which the brain function of an animal model is kept intact, keeping the organ alive and functioning independent from the rest of the body for several hours.

== See also ==
- Intracorporeal
