= University of New Mexico Hospital =

Coordinates: 35.088°N 106.618°W

UNM Hospital

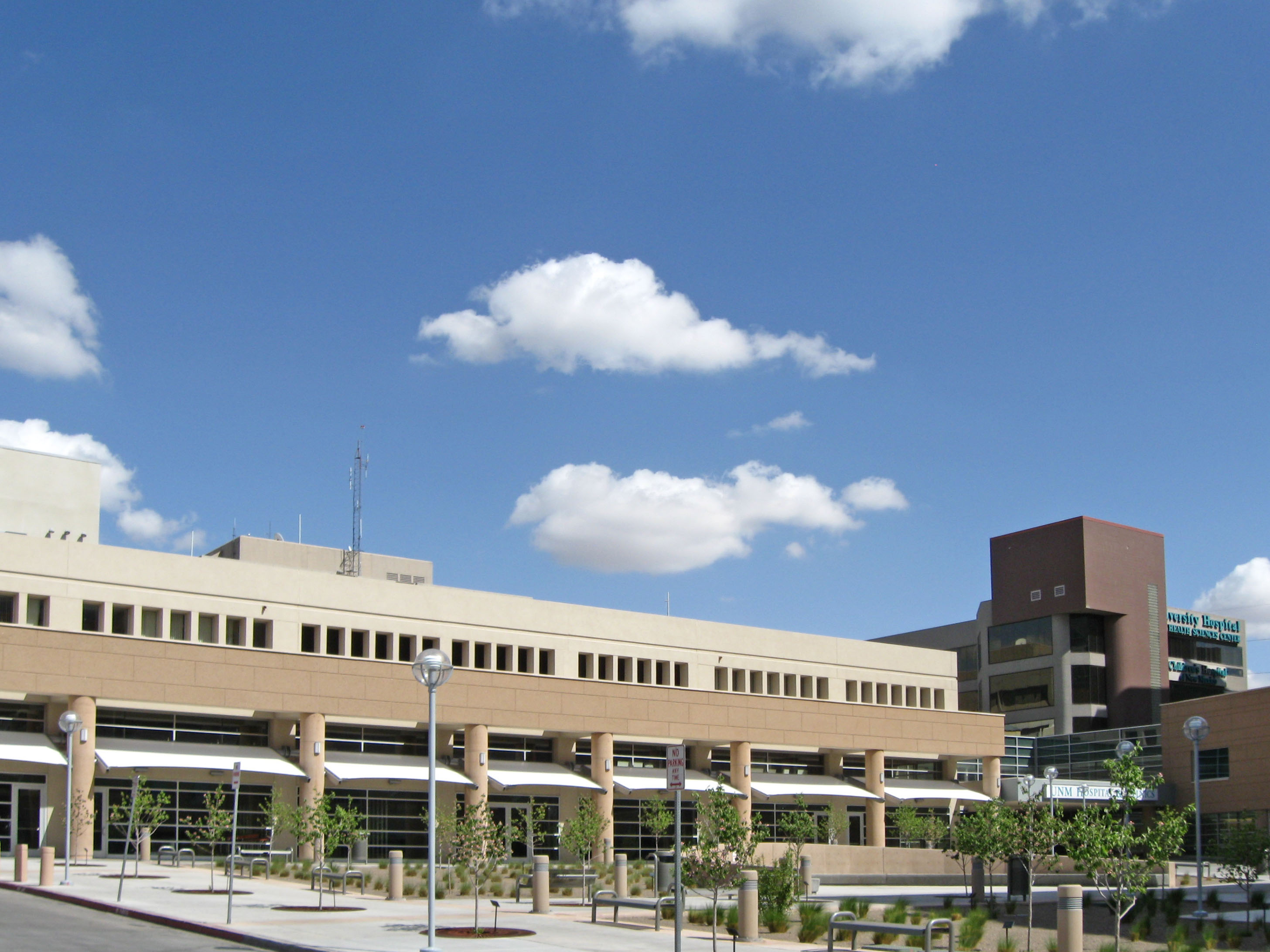

Geography
- Location: 2211 Lomas Blvd. NE, Albuquerque, New Mexico, United States

Organization
- Care system: Medicaid, Medicare, IHS
- Type: Public teaching hospital
- Affiliated university: University of New Mexico

Services
- Emergency department: Level I trauma center
- Beds: 618

History
- Founded: 1954

Links
- Website: https://unmhealth.org
- Lists: Hospitals in New Mexico

The University of New Mexico Hospital (locally known as either University Hospital, UNM Hospital, or shortened to UNMH) is a public teaching hospital located in Albuquerque, New Mexico, immediately north of the main campus of the University of New Mexico. The hospital is New Mexico's only Level I trauma center, houses its only burn unit as well as its first comprehensive stroke center. In addition, UNMH also contains the only children's hospital in New Mexico, and is the state's sole source of 13 pediatric sub-specialties. As a safety net hospital, UNMH serves a large percentage of the uninsured and under-insured population of the state. The hospital is the main teaching facility for the University of New Mexico School of Medicine.

== History ==
The hospital's origins date back to 1952, when Bernalillo County and the Bureau of Indian Affairs (BIA) entered into an agreement to manage the construction of a hospital that would serve both the citizens of the county and the significant Native American population in the surrounding region. As part of the agreement, the BIA donated 5.3 acres of federal land to the county, upon which the hospital would be built. Bernalillo County Indian Hospital opened in October 1954. It was owned and operated by the county, with some additional financial support provided by the federal government on the condition that the hospital maintain at least 100 beds available for medical care of Native American patients.

With the founding of the University of New Mexico School of Medicine in 1964, the hospital assumed the role of the primary teaching facility for the university. The hospital became known as Bernalillo County Medical Center in 1968, to emphasize the institution's role in serving the entire community. The following year, the university assumed operation of the hospital, although Bernalillo County maintained ownership of the facility and property. The name was officially changed to University of New Mexico Hospital in 1979.

The hospital has expanded several times over the years. The Mental Health Center originally opened in 1969. The UNM Cancer Center was established in 1975, and is currently the only NCI Comprehensive Cancer Center in the state of New Mexico. In addition, Carrie Tingley Hospital - which was originally founded in Hot Springs in 1937 as a hospital for crippled children - moved to Albuquerque in 1981 and now operates within the UNMH system. The hospital achieved Level I trauma center status in 1983. In 1994, the University of New Mexico Health Sciences Center was created as an expanded academic campus for education and research in the bio-medical sciences.

In June 2007, the Barbara and Bill Richardson Pavilion, named after former New Mexico Governor Bill Richardson and his wife Barbara, opened as a 455,000-square-foot (42,300 m^{2}), six-story addition to the main hospital building. The $225 million addition took approximately 3 years to complete, and added a greatly expanded emergency department as well as expanded intensive care units, pediatric operating rooms, birthing suites, playrooms, as well as improved children's inpatient wards. In February 2026, it was announced that Richardson's name was removed from this building, apparently in conjunction with the 2025 opening of the Critical Care Tower (described below). Richardson died in 2023.

As of July 26, 2023, UNMH has been the health care provider at the Bernalillo County Metropolitan Detention Center.

On October 5, 2025, UNMH officially opened its $842 million, nine-story Critical Care Tower (CCT). Spanning 684,000 square feet, the tower represents the largest public non-road construction project in New Mexico history. The expansion added 96 adult intensive care beds, an adult emergency department with 68 exam rooms, 18 advanced surgical operating rooms, interventional radiology suites, and a rooftop helipad to expand capacity for the state's only Level I trauma center.

== Innovative Use of ECMO ==
UNM Hospital was the only medical center to use extracorporeal membrane oxygenation (ECMO) to treat patients with Hantavirus pulmonary syndrome (HPS) during the Sin Nombre virus outbreak in the Four Corners region of the United States in the 1990s. This intervention decreased mortality rates to about 40–50%—a significant improvement, given that the illness was almost uniformly fatal without treatment.

In October 2019, emergency medicine physicians at UNM, in cooperation with local EMS units in Albuquerque, became the first team in the Western Hemisphere to perform out-of-hospital ECMO, initiating treatment for a patient suffering from cardiac arrest prior to transport to the hospital.

== Telehealth and Telementoring ==
Given that New Mexico is a large and sparsely populated state, with 32 of the state's 33 counties being listed as medically underserved, UNM Hospital was an early adopter of telehealth and telementoring technology in the 1990s to connect with rural hospitals and clinics in the state that have limited medical resources, including sites operated by the Indian Health Service.

Project ECHO was established in 2003 to provide telementoring to primary care providers at rural clinics and hospitals, with the specific goals of educating and supporting the providers, and improving the quality of specialty care for patients in rural locations. The program has grown enormously since then, with 175 hubs across 46 states in the U.S., and extension programs in 34 different countries. It is now a nationally and internationally recognized model for telementoring to medically underserved communities, culminating with the passage of the ECHO Act by Congress in 2016.

In addition, several other specialties at UNM Hospital operate their own individual telehealth programs, including the adult neurology and stroke service, behavioral health, pediatric dermatology, and pediatric emergency medicine.

== Recognition ==
UNMH has won many awards for its quality:

As of 2011, it has been acknowledged with the following recognition:

As a University Health System Consortium (UHC) 4 stars hospital, placing UNMH in the upper third of academic health centers nationally. As an Advanced Primary Stroke Center by the Joint Commission. As a Pathway to Excellence® Hospital—the only one in NM As Best Hospital in Region for Vaccinating Newborns by the NM Department of Health. As the Certified Nurse Midwife group practice with the lowest episiotomy rates and one of the top practices nationally for: highest total vaginal birth rate; highest spontaneous vaginal birth rate; lowest primary cesarean section rate; highest rate of 6 week post partum visit attendance; highest breast-feeding continuation rate; and lowest total cesarean section rate, by the American College of Nurse Midwives.

== 2014 helicopter crash ==
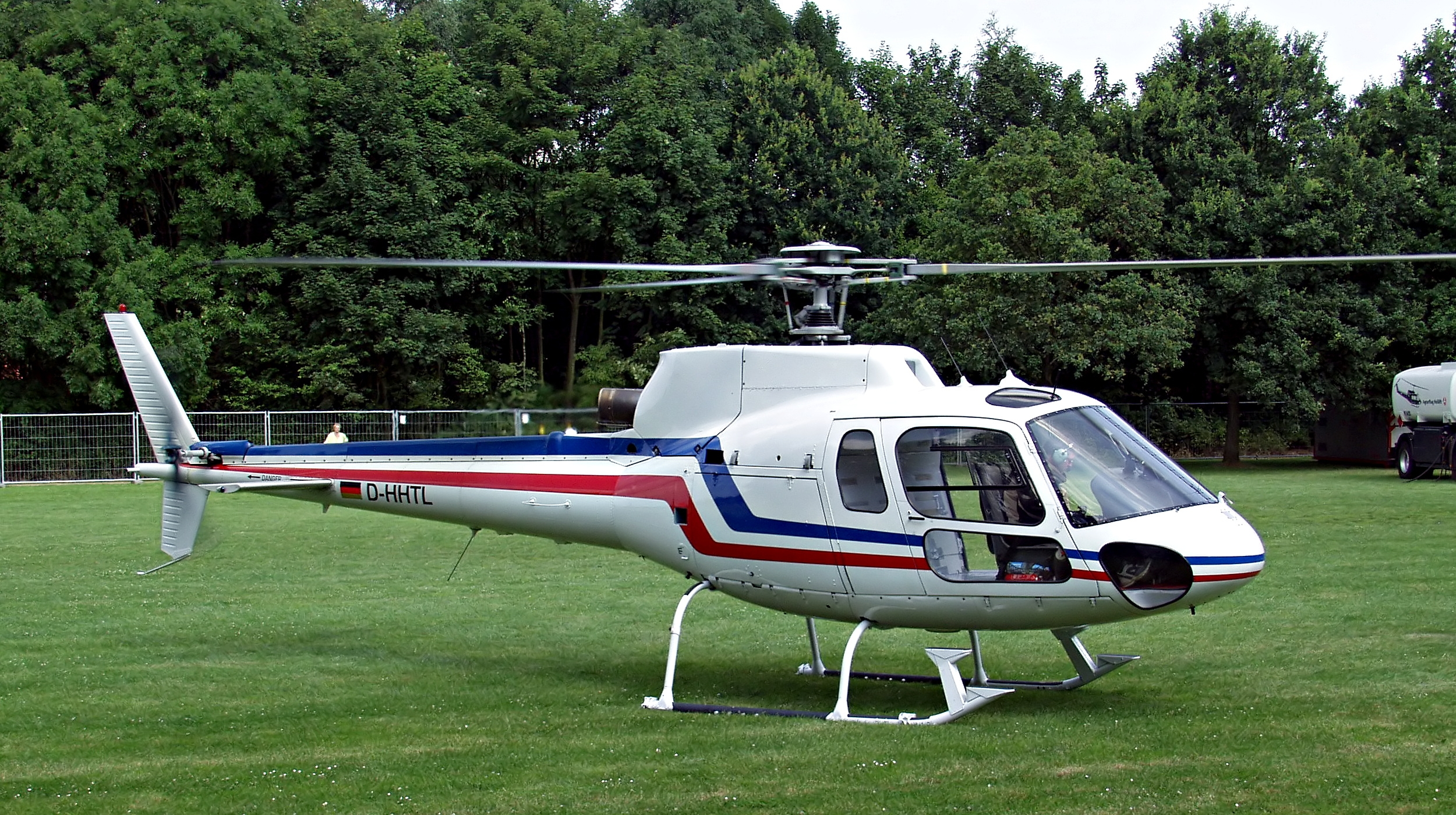
A Eurocopter AS350 similar to the aircraft involved in the accident

On April 9, 2014, a Eurocopter AS350B3E (Registration N395P) crashed on the rooftop of the Barbara and Bill Richardson Pavilion. The helicopter was in the process of departing the rooftop helipad, when for reasons that could not be determined the hydraulic system most likely had a partial failure resulting in a loss of yaw control. Automatic fire suppression systems located near the helipad started, however the helicopter was out of range of the nozzles. There were 3 persons on board: the pilot, who sustained injures, a nurse, and a medic. All three survived the incident. The helicopter was owned by PHI Air Medical LLC, a division of Petroleum Helicopters, Inc., and was later delivered to the company.
