= Impella =

Medical device

Impella is a family of medical devices used for temporary ventricular support in patients with depressed heart function. Some versions of the device can provide left heart support during other forms of mechanical circulatory support including ECMO and Centrimag.

The device is approved for use in high-risk percutaneous coronary intervention (PCI) and cardiogenic shock following heart attack or open heart surgery and is placed through a peripheral artery. From the peripheral artery it pumps blood to the left or right heart via the ascending aorta or pulmonary artery.

The Impella technology was acquired by Abiomed in 2005. As of March 2019, the Impella series includes: the Impella 2.5, Impella 5.0/LD, Impella CP and Impella RP.

== Medical uses ==
The Impella device is an alternative for percutaneous mechanical circulatory support that has been utilized as a bridge to recovery. Used alone or in tandem sets, it utilizes the concept of magnetic levitation to reduce moving parts to an absolute minimum, thus reducing anticoagulation requirements. Cardiogenic shock has been addressed by many devices, most notably the intraaortic balloon pump (IABP). The technology deployed by the Impella device similarly alters the fundamental characteristics of the human circulatory system. As the propeller is accelerated to give respite to an acutely injured myocardium, the circulatory system transitions from a pulsatile mechanism to continuous flow. Cellular response to cardiogenic shock is poorly described by either method (counterpulsation or continuous flow). Control of directional flow of the device (magnetic vectors) is under investigation for addressing right- versus left-sided heart failure. Transseptal intervention in addressing physiologic mismatch in perfusion between left- and right-sided heart failure is in experimental status. However, recent studies point to significantly greater in-hospital risks of major bleeding, death, and other adverse events for patients supported by Impella devices, compared with those managed with an IABP. A propensity-matched comparison of patients receiving mechanical circulatory support (MCS) for myocardial infarction–related shock saw a nearly one-third excess in mortality and almost a doubling in risk of major bleeding, both in-hospital endpoints, with use of Impella compared to IABP. Impella may provide some of the results similar to venoarterial extracorporeal life support and TandemHeart.

In patients with acute myocardial infarction complicated by cardiogenic shock, haemodynamic support with the Impella device had no significant effect on thirty-day mortality as compared with IABP. Overall outcomes in the population, regardless of MCS device, were significantly worse for patients after the 2008 approval of Impella. Among hospitals using Impella, those using it the most had significantly worse outcomes with Impella than those using it the least.

Potential complications related to the use of Impella are device related, peripheral vascular and distal thrombus formation with subsequent strokes. The most common complications reported were bleeding requiring transfusion, vascular access complications, infection, haemolysis, vascular complications requiring surgical repair, limb ischaemia, and bleeding requiring surgical intervention (2.6%). Valvular complications included aortic and mitral valve injury or mitral valve regurgitation.

== Technology ==
Impella heart pumps are percutaneous microaxial pumps that act as mechanical circulatory support devices in patients in need of hemodynamic support. The pumps are mounted on support catheters and typically inserted through the femoral artery, although axillary and subclavian artery approaches are not uncommon.

The Impella Device is a generational extension of the Intra aortic balloon pump (IABP) in addressing cardiogenic shock. Tech has allowed a single moving piece floated by magnetically steered mechanisms to deploy an "Archimedes Pump" just north of the Aortic Valve that purports to reduce both preload and afterload. The same tech can apparently also be deployed just above the pulmonary (pulmonic) valve as a gate on right sided heart failure.

== Left-sided support ==
Designed to provide hemodynamic support when the patient's heart is unable to produce sufficient cardiac output, Impella heart pumps can supply one to five liters per minute of blood flow. The physiological consequences of left-sided support are threefold. First, it unloads the left ventricle by reducing left ventricular end-diastolic volume and pressure, thereby decreasing ventricular wall stress, work, and myocardial oxygen demand. Second, it increases mean arterial pressure, diastolic pressure, and cardiac output, improving cardiac power output and cardiac index. The combined effects on wall stress and perfusion pressure (especially diastolic pressure) augment coronary perfusion. Lastly, augmented cardiac output and forward flow from the left ventricle decreases pulmonary capillary wedge pressure and reduces right ventricular afterload.

== Approval ==
Impella was approved for mechanical circulatory support in 2008, but large-scale, real-world data on its use are lacking. In June 2008, the Impella 2.5 heart pump received FDA 510(k) clearance for partial circulatory support for periods of up to six hours during cardiac procedures not requiring cardiopulmonary bypass. In March 2015, it received FDA premarket approval for elective and urgent high-risk percutaneous intervention procedures. In December 2016, the premarket approval was expanded to include the Impella CP heart pump.

In April 2009, the Impella 5.0 and Impella LD heart pumps received 510(k) clearance for circulatory support for periods of up to six hours during cardiac procedures not requiring cardiopulmonary bypass. In July 2010, the automated Impella controller received FDA 510(k) clearance for use by trained healthcare professionals in healthcare facilities and medical transport.

In January 2015, the Impella RP was granted a humanitarian device exemption to provide circulatory assistance for patients with right heart failure.

In February 2018, the FDA approved the sale of the Impella ventricular support systems.

Deaths and strokes in the data base overall increased after the Impella gained regulatory approval in 2008, compared to earlier years; mortality went up 17% and strokes more than tripled.

In July 2023, the FDA issued a Class I recall for all Impella left-sided blood pumps due to risk of motor damage after contact with a transcatheter aortic valve replacement stent.

In March 2024, the FDA issued a warning about Impella left-sided blood pumps being linked to 49 deaths due to left ventricular perforation or wall rupture.

== See also ==
- Protected percutaneous coronary intervention
