= Intracorporeal =

Adjective meaning within the body

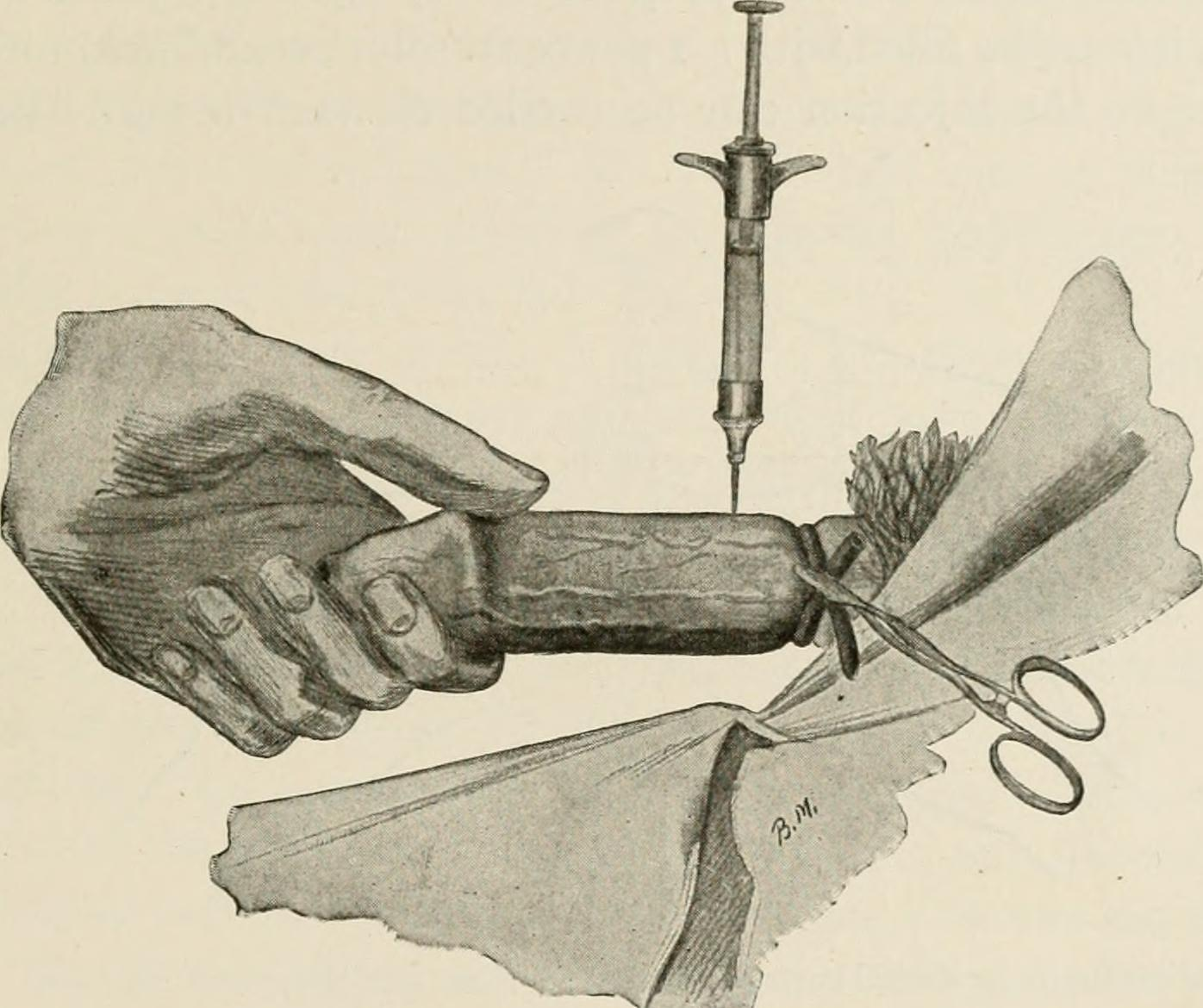
Medical illustration demonstrating the injection of an anesthetizing cocaine solution into the corpora cavernosa of a tourniqueted penis. Date: 1920

Intracorporeal or intracorporal is an adjective that means within (intra-) the body (corpus). Its antonym is extracorporeal.

It is used frequently in medicine to describe medical procedures that occur within the body, or within a corpus, as opposed to extracorporeal procedures (e.g. extracorporeal membrane oxygenation).

In a medical or surgical context, it may refer to:

- Intracorporeal anastomosis
- Intracorporeal circulation
- Intracorporeal energy harvesting, harvesting energy from the body, and storing it, to sustain a medical device (e.g. a pacemaker).
- Intracorporeal injection
- Intracorporeal microrobotics
- Intracorporeal reconstruction
- Intracorporeal suturing
- Intracorporeal urinary diversion
- Lithotripsy:
  - Intracorporeal electrohydraulic lithotripsy
  - Intracorporeal laser lithotripsy
  - Intracorporeal pneumatic lithotripsy
  - Intracorporeal shock wave lithotripsy

== See also ==
- The dictionary definition of intracorporeal at Wiktionary
- The dictionary definition of intracorpuscular at Wiktionary
- Human body (corpus humanum)
- In vivo
