= ELSO =

ELSO may refer to:

- European Life Scientist Organization
- A tradename for S-Amlodipine
- Extracorporeal Life Support Organization
