= Ghassem Amoabediny =

Iranian biotechnologist

- قاسم عموعابدینی
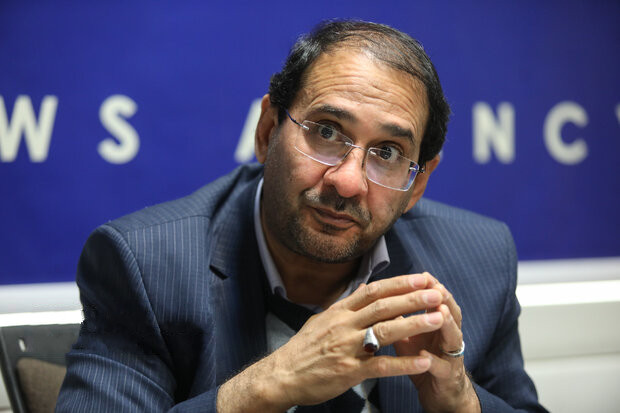
- Born: 1965 (age 60–61)
- Education: RWTH-Aachen (PhD); University of Tehran (BSc, MSc)
- Known for: works on artificial lung and bioreactors
- Scientific career
- Fields: Nanobiotechnology
- Institutions: University of Tehran, MSRT
- Thesis: A new method to quantify the CO 2 sensitivity of micro-organisms in shaken bioreactors and scale up to stirred tank fermentors (2006)
- Doctoral advisor: Jochen Büchs
- Other academic advisors: Winfried Hartmeier; Ulrich Klinner; Lothar Elling; Mohammad Ali Moosavian

Ghassem Amoabediny (Persian: قاسم عموعابدینی; born 1965) is an Iranian researcher and Professor of Nanobiotechnology at the University of Tehran. He is known for his works on bioengineering, nanobiotechnology, tissue engineering, novel drug delivery system, and nanobiosensors.

== Career ==
Amoabediny earned his BSc (1994) and MSc (1999) in chemical engineering from the University of Tehran and received his PhD (2006) in biochemical engineering from RWTH-Aachen University. He then received his postdoc training in nanobiotechnology at TU-Kaiserslautern. During his master and PhD he focused on the Biochemical Engineering–Biotechnology and during his postdoc focused on Nanobiotechnology and biomedical engineering. He is a faculty member at the University of Tehran since 2001 and is (co)author of over 200 scientific papers in international journals and conference records and holder of 60 patents / patent applications (more than 100 papers in International Journals and 80 international Congress and 80 national congress). He has several international projects with VU University Medical Center, (RWTH)-Aachen University, Gent University (Belgium) and York University. He is Guest Professor of Biomedical /Nanobiotechnology at VUmc Amsterdam and member of joint nanobiotechnology group and administrator of bioreactor at VUmc-Amsterdam. He is an editor of several international journals of Fermentation Technology and editorial board of Archives of Neuroscience and reviewer of Journal of Material Science and Engineering C. He has been manager and scientific board for several national projects on the basis of regenerative medicine, bone tissue engineering, lung tissue engineering, artificial organs (lung, kidney), nanobiosensors and nanobiofunctional particles for separation. He has more than 50 national patents and 10 US patents which one of them has been granted. He was an assistant professor in University of Tehran in Department of Chemical Engineering from 2007 to 2010, Dean of Faculty of New Sciences and Technologies (FNST) from 2010 to 2012, President of Science and Technology Park from 2008 to 2011 and Director of Research Centre of New Technologies in Life Science Engineering (UTLSE) and professor in University of Tehran's Department of Chemical Engineering since 2006. He is a former deputy head of Islamic Azad University Science and Research Branch. He was the Research Deputy at the University of Tehran between 2011 and 2014.
