= Protected percutaneous coronary intervention =

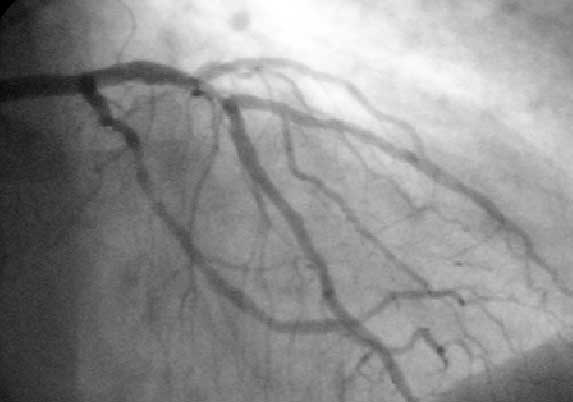
- A coronary angiogram delineating the left coronary circulation.

Protected percutaneous coronary intervention, abbreviated as Protected PCI, is a heart procedure that involves a ventricular assist device that is used to treat patients with cardiovascular disease, including advanced heart failure.

== Procedure ==
During a protected percutaneous coronary intervention (Protected PCI) procedure, "the Impella 2.5 heart pump helps maintain a stable heart function by pumping blood for the heart. This gives a weak heart muscle an opportunity to rest and reduces the heart’s workload, preventing the heart from being overstressed by the procedure as coronary artery blockages are repaired". Deborah Moore, the Director of Interventional Cardiology at Florida Hospital Zephyrhills, stated that protected PCI is beneficial in patients who are "inoperable or non-candidates for stents and angioplasty." The Impella 2.5, used in protected PCI, "received FDA approval for elective and urgent high-risk PCI procedures in March 2015, following its 510(k) clearance in 2008" and as a percutaneous hemodynamic support device, it was deemed "safe and effective for patients with complex coronary disease, depressed ejection fraction, other co-morbidities, and who have been refused for surgical treatment." The PROTECT II Study, published in Circulation found that the "Impella 2.5 provided superior hemodynamic support in comparison with IABP, with maximal decrease in cardiac power output from baseline of −0.04±0.24 W in comparison with −0.14±0.27 W for IABP (P=0.001)." Hospitals such as Detroit Medical Center, and organizations such as the Society of Cardiovascular Angiography and Interventions, have featured lectures including "The New Era of Protected PCI: Treating Elective and High-Risk PCI Patients with Impella 2.5", and "Expanding your Patient Practice with Protected PCI: Treating the Most Complex Patients" in order to educate physicians on using protected percutaneous coronary intervention, respectively.

== See also ==
- Intra-aortic balloon pump
- Seldinger technique
- Impella
- Acute cardiac unloading
