= Orphan device =

Devices for rare disease patients

An orphan device, is a medical device that is essential for diagnosing, treating, or managing rare diseases. Nevertheless, very few medical devices are specifically developed for rare diseases (in contrast to orphan medicinal products). At the same time, many patients and carers express a substantial unmet need for new medical devices for their conditions.

Orphan devices constitute a very diverse group of products, reflecting the broad field of rare diseases. Device needs for rare diseases vary from noninvasive markers for monitoring disease activity, wearables and tests that allow home monitoring of disease by patients and treatment side effects, or imaging enhanced functional scans. Devices are also needed to support quality of life and activities of daily living as best as possible, helping, for example, with rehabilitation, muscle support, or nutrition support. As such, there is a high need to connect patients, carers, and healthcare professionals to technology that can address these requirements.

The development of medical technologies for rare diseases faces many of the same challenges as developing orphan medicinal products, including the small number of patients, the geographical spread of patients, the lack of expertise on specific diseases, and the fact that most diseases are pediatric-onset. Some geographies have developed supportive specific orphan-device legislation. However, there is no harmonization between different geographies, and joint applications between Europe, the United States and Japan do not exist. Examples of existing orphan device legislation are the United States Food and Drug Administration (FDA) Humanitarian Use Device (HUD) program, which designates medical devices to benefit patients in treating or diagnosing rare diseases. In Japan, the PMD Act outlines regulations for reviewing medical device applications, except for medical software programs which are independently regulated. Europe has no legislation specifically for medical devices for rare diseases in the implementation in 2021 of new regulations for in vitro diagnostics and medical devices. However, in 2024, a specific guidance has been developed for orphan devices, and since then, dedicated EMA panels to support the development of orphan devices have been set up.

The approval process provided by the FDA and the Japanese Pharmaceuticals and Medical Devices Agency allows a medical device to be marketed with several incentives and limited prove of effectiveness. Like orphan drugs, most orphan devices would not be profitable to develop and produce without government assistance and regulatory incentives due to the small number of patients affected by these conditions. The assignment of orphan status to a disease and to devices developed to diagnose and treat it is a matter of public policy that depends on the country's legislation if any exists.

== Definitions ==
=== United States ===
The FDA currently does not have a definition for orphan devices or orphan medical technology. The closest is that for a Humanitarian Use Device (HUD), which is "a medical device intended to benefit patients in the treatment or diagnosis of a disease or condition that affects or is manifested in not more than 8,000 individuals in the United States per year".

=== Europe ===
In the EU no definition of orphan devices or orphan medical technology exists. Orphan devices follow the same procedure as devices for common diseases, and have to adhere to the Medical Device Regulation. Specific guidance for the development is available. In the proposed revisions of the Medical Device Regulation, specific support has been included.

=== Japan ===
In Japan drugs and medical devices are given the designation as an orphan drug or device based on the Act of Securing Quality, Efficacy, Safety of Pharmaceuticals, Medical Devices, Regenerative or Cellular Therapy Products, Gene Therapy Products, and Cosmetics "if they are intended for use in less than 50,000 patients in Japan and for which there is a high medical need".

== Support for orphan devices ==
Several initiatives are currently supporting both research and the development of policies and incentives for orphan devices. Most notably, the International Rare Diseases Research Consortium (IRDiRC) has set up a Working Group specifically for medical technologies for rare diseases. In the United States, the SHIP-MD consortium examining unmet needs of pediatric medical device development and develops solutions to address those needs. In Europe, the CORE-MD project, review methodologies for the clinical evaluation of high-risk medical devices, also specifically for rare diseases and recommend new designs to set an appropriate balance between innovation, safety, and clinical effectiveness. Specific EU4Health co-funded projects, DeCODe, i4Kids4Rare, OrphaDev4Kids, are supporting the development of orphan devices by providing regulatory, business, clinical and technical support.
