= Artificial lung =

Prosthetic device

Artificial lungs are designed to replicate the functions of the human lungs — the oxygenation of blood and subsequent removal of carbon dioxide. Generally the term is used to mean extracorporeal membrane oxygenation (ECMO). The only current treatment for diseased lungs is a lung transplant, which carries several risks, and is not readily available. The amount of people needing a lung transplant grows each year, and the supply of available transplants is unable to keep up. With this in mind, research has moved forward with artificial lungs.

A true artificial lung kept a patient alive for 48 hours until a lung transplant could be performed.

Innovations like creating working lungs in a lab and successfully transplanting them back into a living animal, serve to highlight the potential applications of this technology. This technology is not a clinical product on the market — this article will focus on current research and development of the technology.

== History ==
Clinical use of oxygenators for artificial lungs have included bubble, film, and membrane type. Bubble-type oxygenators directly bubble oxygen into the blood, which can cause damage to the blood. Film-type oxygenators exchange gases with the environment through films, and can also lead to blood damage. Membrane-type oxygenators, which can be plate or hollow fiber shaped, use a membrane to separate chambers of oxygen and blood.

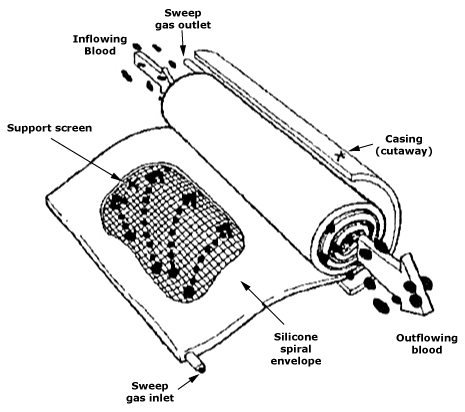
Example of a silicon membrane-type oxygenator

Early attempts to create an artificial oxygenator focused on hemodialysis cellulose, cellophane, and polyethylene membranes. In 1950, a bubble type oxygenator was used to support a heart-lung machine, which was successfully used in 1957. Silicon based Lande-Edward and Kolobow lungs came about in 1969 and 1971, respectively. Artificial lungs today typically use hollow fiber membranes to oxygenate the blood. This type of membrane entered the market in 1979 and has been associated with lower rates of blood trauma.

Additionally, extracorporeal membrane oxygenators, or ECMO, can be used temporarily to remove carbon dioxide and add oxygen to the blood stream. ECMO is a system that circulates blood outside the body through a membrane oxygenator. ECMO differs from true artificial lungs because blood flow to the heart is not continued during their use. The oxygenator will execute the process of gas exchange by oxygenating the blood and removing carbon dioxide. We can also configure ECMO so that it is either veno-venous (VV) to provide patients with respiratory support or veno-arterial (VA) for both cardiac and respiratory support, depending on the condition of the patient.

ECMOs are sufficient oxygenators for up to several hours, but research into their long term use is still ongoing. Issues have been seen with blood clots forming where the gas exchange is occurring. Today, regardless of oxygenator therapy used (ECMO or artificial lung), lung transplant eventually becomes necessary after the natural lung fails.

== Medical uses ==
Artificial lungs are primarily used as a bridge to lung transplantation. Many patients with lung diseases are at a greater risk of experiencing hypoxia and/or hypercapnia which are conditions that are unable to be corrected solely through mechanical ventilation. In these cases, ECMO is the preferred method to maintain sufficient gas exchange while the patient waits for a lung donor to become available. There has been massive improvements in modern medicine when it comes to the outcomes for patients bridged to transplants with ECMO. Some studies suggest an increased survival rate, which can be attributed to the advancement of technology and management strategies.

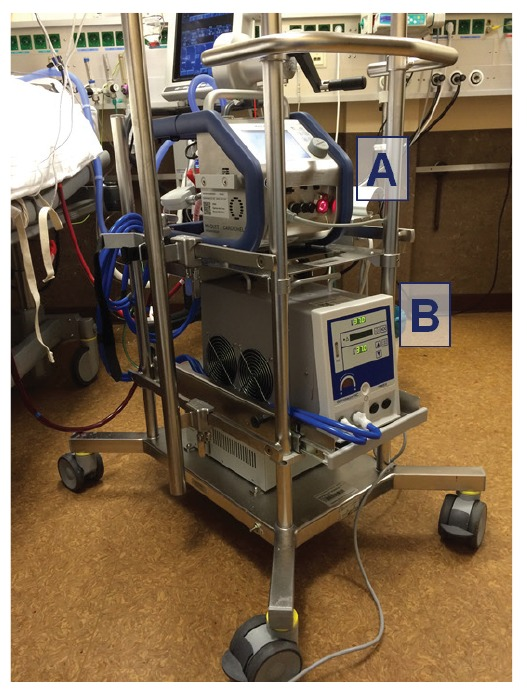
The picture shows an ECMO treatment unit consisting of an ECMO system and thermoregulatory device used in an intensive care unit.

Additionally, artificial lung devices are also used as a bridge to recovery. Many of these cases are when the patient has acute respiratory distress syndrome (ARDS) or some other form of acute lung failure. The system allows the patient's lungs to relax, which reduces the stress and oxygen toxicity that is normally attributed with prolonged mechanical ventilation on the lungs. This approach may lead to improved patient outcomes by minimizing the volume of ventilator-induced lung injury and therefore, promoting damaged lung tissue towards recovery.

These systems can also be used to support the removal of carbon dioxide without significant oxygenation taking place. They are designed for extracorporeal carbon dioxide removal (ECCO2R), and will operate at lower blood levels which is useful for patients who have hypercapnic respiratory failure, and may suffer from chronic obstructive pulmonary disease. Devices like pumpless interventional lung assist systems and pump-driven ECCO2R units have shown evidence of being able to effectively remove carbon dioxide while reducing the need for invasive mechanical ventilation.

Due to the current limitations on artificial lung technology, these devices are mainly used for short term respiratory support. Long term implantation is difficult due to a variety of complications such as thrombosis, bleeding, infection, and clot formation. This leads to lung transplantation being the only definitive curable treatment for patients who have later stage lung disease.

The future developments of this technology include portable devices, implantable artificial lungs, and bioengineered lung tissue. The goal for future development of tissue engineering and regenerative medicine is to create an artificial lung that functions identically to a biological lung. This would improve outcomes as patients would not need to wait for donor lungs and would receive prompt treatment.

== Design ==
Artificial lungs function by replicating the gas exchange process done by the natural lungs in the body. The system transfers oxygen into the blood while removing CO₂. This occurs due to a partial pressure gradient in the system to allow for diffusion to occur.

=== Gas exchange ===
In the lungs, the process of gas exchange occurs across the alveolar-capillary membrane. These membranes are large in their surface area and also contain a very short diffusion distance, which optimizes the lung for gas exchange. The way that artificial lungs mimic this process is through the use of polymer based membranes which helps to maximize the gas exchange process for the system while limiting clot formation and inflammatory responses.

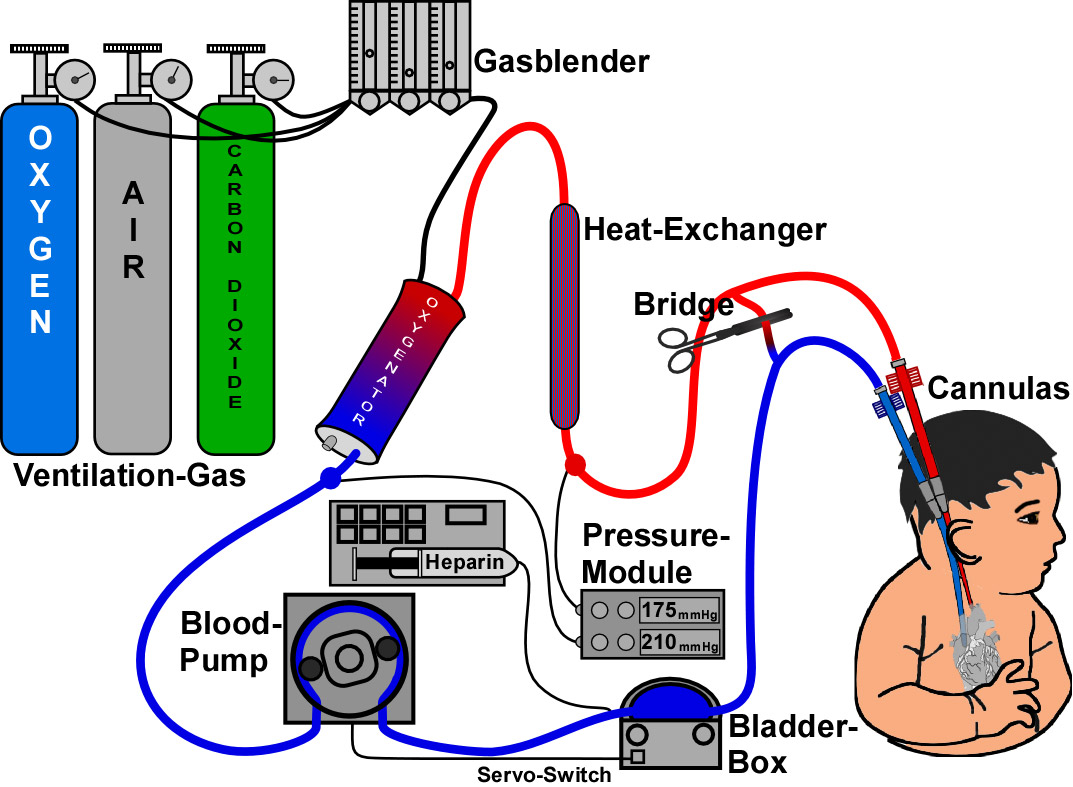
Schematic diagram of an extracorporeal membrane oxygenation (ECMO) system showing the major components of the extracorporeal circulation circuit.

=== Hollow Fiber Membrane Oxygenators ===
Modern artificial lungs and extracorporeal membrane oxygenation (ECMO) use hollow fiber membrane oxygenators. This consists of many small, cylindrical fibers that are made from polymers. It is not recommended to use unmodified or poorly biocompatible membranes as that can cause the blood coagulation cascade.

In the oxygenator, the oxygen flow occurs through the interior section of the fiber, while blood flow occurs on the exterior section. This system prevents blood-gas contact from occurring directly and provides patients with more safety than initial gas exchange systems.

=== Design Features ===
The hollow fiber membrane oxygenators are designed to maximize diffusion surface area, replicating the alveolar-capillary membrane. This makes them a highly suitable system for future, potential clinical uses. The system must also ensure that blood and gas flow are kept at a constant level to maintain efficacy. The biomaterials used should positively affect the body and not severely increase the risk of clotting or an immune response.

== Materials and Biocompatibility ==
Artificial lung material choice must be decided by biocompatibility of a material and its ability to prevent adsorptions that can stop gas exchange. Poor biocompatibility leads to blood coagulation and the creation of a blood clot, which can lead to blockage of the artificial lung. Specifically, once an oxygenator membrane comes into contact with blood, protein and fibrin may adsorb and prevent gas movement across. To prevent this, varying techniques can be used to adjust the surface chemistry of oxygenators. Lack of nucleophiles, low charge, and even amounts of hydrophobic and hydrophilic areas help improve biocompatibility of membranes.

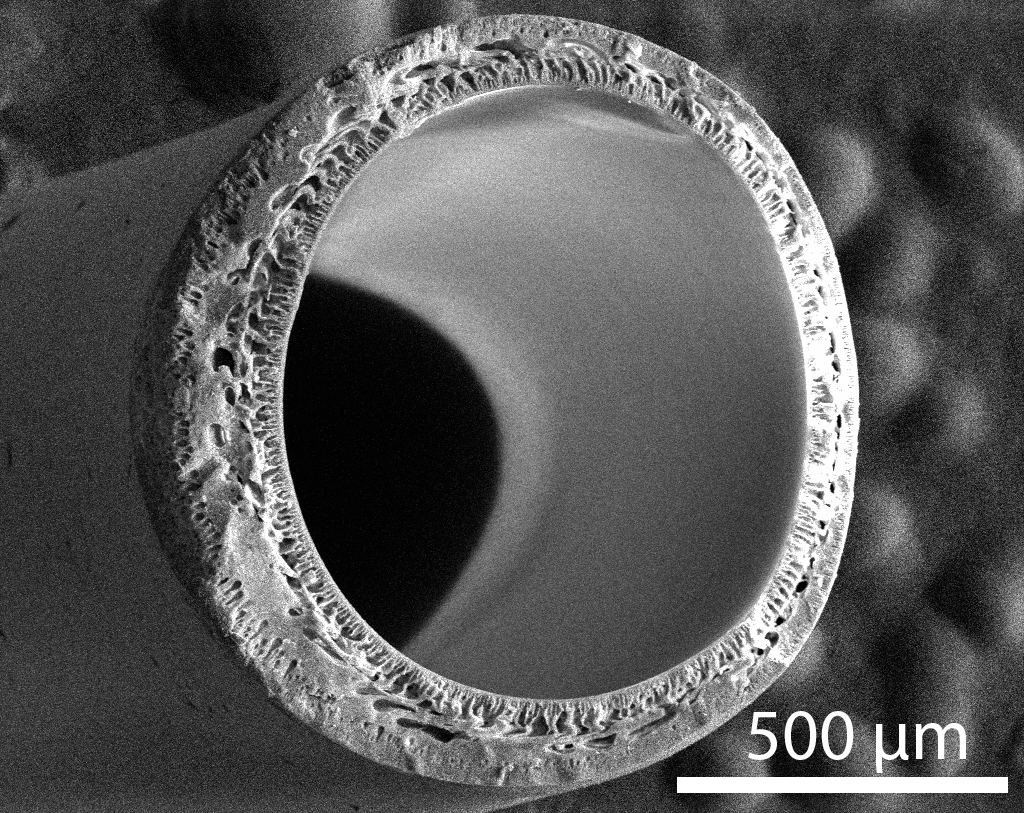
Polysulfone hollow fiber membrane seen by SEM

Polymers chosen for oxygenator membranes typically have molecules of a high molecular weight, an amorphous structure, and are durable/non-brittle. Polypropylene, poly-4-methylpentene-1, polydimethylsiloxane, polysulfone, polyethersulfone, polyether ether ketone, polyetherimide, polyethylene and polyvinylidene fluoride are some typical oxygenator membrane materials. To enhance their biocompatibility, they are sometimes coated in silicon or heparin, which can also help prevent clotting. Hollow fiber membranes sometimes face plasma leakage issues, when plasma enters the pores of the fiber and blocks oxygen exchange, which can be managed by the fabrication process used.

There has been research into using tissue engineering to create an artificial lung. This could use stem cells from the lung to create 3D tissue models, which may be able to reduce the need for lung for lung transplants. As of 2018, tissue engineered lungs were considered "far from reality". Reproducing the extracellular matrix and creating fibers that are as densely packed as a real lung have been some main challenges in this application. Research has begun on decellularized pig lung, polyethylene glycol, polyvinyl alcohol, and poly glycerol sebacate as potential cell scaffolds for tissue engineered lungs. Stem cells could be added to these scaffolds to begin the creation of the artificial lung.

Material	Measure of Oxygen Transport		Flexural Modulus (MPa)	Glass Transition Temperature (K)
Material	Oxygen Permeability Coefficient (m^{3}(STP) m)/(s*m^{2}*Pa)	Oxygen Transmission Rate (cc/m²/day)	Flexural Modulus (MPa)	Glass Transition Temperature (K)
Polypropylene (isotactic)	2.12–7.73 * 10^{-18}	N/A	1000–1389	275.5–283.7
Poly-4-methylpentene-1	317.12 * 10^{-16}	N/A	1300–1800	303–323
Polydimethylsiloxane	4500 (Filled with 33% silica)	N/A	Young's modulus: 0.36–0.87	123.3–150
Polysulfone (bisphenol A)	1.125*10^{-17}	N/A	2758	459
Polyethersulfone	6*10^{-18}	N/A	2552	498
Polyether ether ketone	6.2*10^{-16}	N/A	300–3700	410–425
Polyetherimide	1*10^{-19}	N/A	3300	488.15
Polyethylene: low density	N/A	2000–6820	124–690	173.15
Polyethylene: high density	N/A	465–5580	660–1500	173.15
Polyvinylidene fluoride	2.31*10^{-15}	N/A	1930–8550	238

== Future directions ==
Challenges to overcome before artificial lungs become commonplace. These challenges include, but are not limited to "creation of ideal scaffold materials, differentiation and expansion of lung-specific cell populations and full maturation of engineered constructs to provide graft longevity after implantation in vivo".

The most notable issue is intra-device thrombosis. The problem seen is that "the large blood-contracting surface area of these devices results in increased thrombogenicity relative to VADs (ventricular assist device)". Thrombogenicity is the tendency of a material that is in contact with the blood to produce a clot. This causes the current clinically available systems to have a short lifetime, typically from 1 to 2 weeks before an exchange is needed. The end goal of artificial lung development is considered to be "a durable, fully intracorporeal device that allows long-term support with minimal inhibition of patient mobility or ambulation".

To overcome these complications, researchers are exploring regenerative medicine as well as stem cell technologies. This is not a new idea — in the early 2000s, bone marrow derived stem cells were used to demonstrate engraftment in animal models, however the results were so minimal that no significant physiological effect could be contributed to the stem cells. Induced pluripotent stem cells (iPSCs) were the next considered and research is still ongoing towards this topic.

With the uses of iPSCs, the concept of a patient derived lung graft to reduce immune responses becomes more feasible. There has been progress in this work by the use of decellularized donor lungs, where the original cells are removed, leaving the natural extracellular matrix scaffold to be seeded with the patient's stem cells. This moves forward to the goal of providing a functional device that holds less risk of negative immune response and will provide long term support.

== See also ==
- Extracorporeal membrane oxygenation
- Heart-lung machine
- Lung transplantation
