= Extracorporeal life support =

Life support for medical patients

Extracorporeal life support (ECLS), is a set of extracorporeal modalities that can provide oxygenation, removal of carbon dioxide, and/or circulatory support, excluding cardiopulmonary bypass for cardiothoracic or vascular surgery.

ECLS modalities include:

Extracorporeal membrane oxygenation (ECMO) - for temporary support of patients with respiratory and/or cardiac failure.

Extracorporeal carbon dioxide removal (ECCO2R) - for removal of CO_{2} without cardiac support. ECCO2R is used for patients with hypercapnic respiratory failure or patients with less severe forms of acute respiratory distress syndrome.
