= Gus Rosenberg =

American biomedical engineer

Gerson Rosenberg
- Born: August 20, 1944 (age 82)
- Education: Penn State College of Engineering
- Engineering career
- Discipline: Biomedical engineer

Gerson "Gus" Rosenberg is an American biomedical engineer. He is the Jane A. Fetter Professor of Surgery, professor of bioengineering, and chief of the Division of Applied Biomedical Engineering (previously known as the Division of Artificial Organs) at Penn State's Milton S. Hershey Medical Center and Penn State College of Medicine.

== Background and education ==
Rosenberg was born on August 20, 1944, and raised in Chalfont, Pennsylvania. He studied mechanical engineering at Penn State University and received his Bachelor of Science, Master of Science, and Ph.D. degrees at the university. He began research on heart-assist pumps in 1970 as a graduate student at Penn State. His research led to a number of heart devices developed by the team that he now leads at Penn State. He was part of the team that designed the university's first heart-assist pump.

== Circulatory support devices ==
Rosenberg's research and teaching have resulted in devices such as a Left Ventricular Assist device (LVAD) and electric total artificial heart. He was part of the original team that developed the current clinically available Pierce-Donachy left ventricular assist device marketed by Thoratec. He was the principal investigator on the development on the Penn State Electric Total Artificial Heart, currently under development by Abiomed, Inc. and is referred to as the AbioCor II device. In addition, Rosenberg led the team that developed the Arrow LionHeart, the world's first completely implantable left ventricular assist device that has been utilized in 30 patients. Devices currently in development include an implantable, wireless, heart assist pump, now in clinical trials, and a wireless total heart replacement, currently undergoing pre-clinical durability testing.

He is a member of the board of trustees of the American Society for Artificial Internal Organs and serves on the editorial board of its journal.

== Recognition ==
- In 2002 he was named “Engineer of the Year” by Design News Magazine.
- He is a past president of the American Society for Artificial Internal Organs.
