= Activated clotting time =

- Synonyms: ACT, WBCT, activated clotting time, activated coagulation time, whole-blood clotting time, whole-blood coagulation time
- Test of: Whole blood

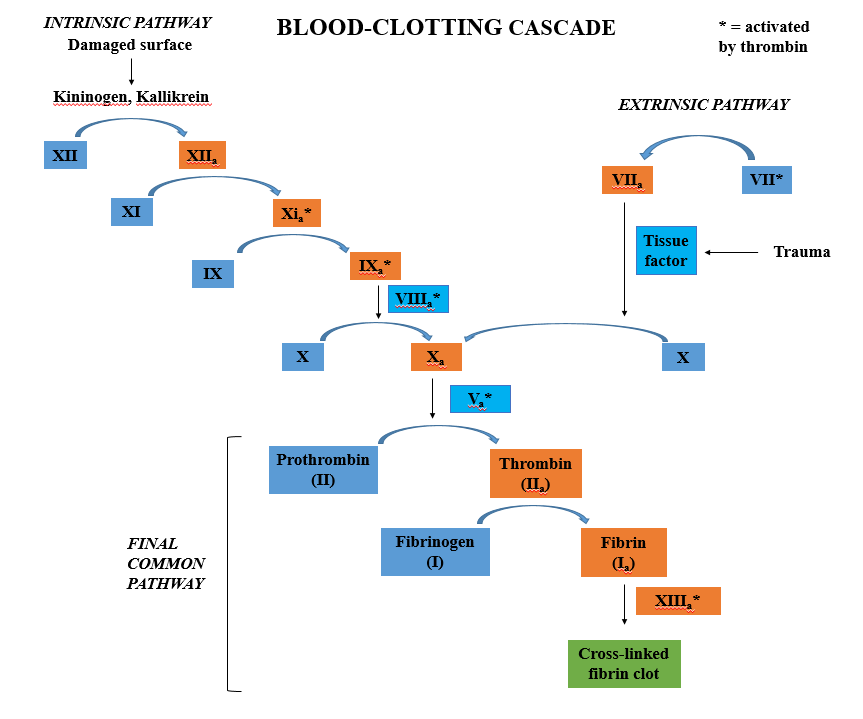
Blood clotting cascade

Activated clotting time (ACT), also known as activated coagulation time, is a test of coagulation.

The ACT test can be used to monitor anticoagulation effects, such as from high-dose heparin before, during, and shortly after procedures that require intense anticoagulant administration, such as cardiac bypass, interventional cardiology, thrombolysis, extra-corporeal membrane oxygenation (ECMO), and continuous dialysis. It measures the seconds needed for whole blood to clot upon activation of the intrinsic pathway by the addition of factor XII activators. The clotting time is based on a relative scale and requires a baseline value for comparison due to inconsistencies between the source and formulation of the activator being used. It is usually ordered in situations where the partial thromboplastin time (PTT) test may take an excessive amount of time to process or is not clinically useful.

Prolongation of the ACT may indicate a deficiency in coagulation factors, thrombocytopenia, or platelet dysfunction. Clotting time measurements can be affected by drugs such as warfarin, aprotinin, and GpIIb/IIIa inhibitors, and physiologic disturbances such as hypothermia, hypervolemia, and hypovolemia.

== History ==
The ACT was first introduced by Hattersley in 1966. Previously, to monitor coagulation effects, blood was placed in a glass tube, kept at 37 degrees Celsius, and manually manipulated until the blood was no longer fluid. It fell out of favor to monitor heparin dosing during cardiac surgery because of the dedicated time required. While the glass tube surface activated coagulation, the clotting time could be decreased with the use of other activators like celite and kaolin.

== Methodology ==
Typically a sample of blood is put in a vial or cartridge along with coagulation activators. The sample is maintained at a specified temperature, often 37 degrees Celsius. The coagulation end point can be determined by the optical (e.g., increased opacity detected by optical sensor) or mechanical properties (e.g., increased rigidity detected by the displacement of material in the vial) of the clotting blood.

== Results ==
Results can vary based on the equipment and methodology used. For example, systems that do not pre-warm the vial or sample may see increased time to clotting because clotting times increase with temperature. A common reference range is between 70 and 120 seconds. For patients on anticoagulants, the time is increased.
