= Microchip (disambiguation) =

A microchip or silicon chip or integrated circuit is a set of electronic components on a single unit.

- Microchip implant (animal), a microchip implanted into animals
- Microchip implant (human), a microchip implanted into a human being

Microchip can also refer to:

- Microchip Technology, a company that makes 8, 16 and 32-bit microcontroller lines
- Microchip (comics), a supporting character in the Punisher comics
- Micro Chips, a Mexican children's rock band

== See also ==
- Microprocessor
