= David Lederman =

American aerospace engineer, entrepreneur, author and humanitarian

- Born: David Mordechai Lederman; May 26, 1944; Bogotá, Colombia
- Died: August 15, 2012 (aged 68); Marblehead, Massachusetts, U.S.
- Education: Cornell University
- Occupations: Scientist, researcher, entrepreneur

David M. Lederman (May 26, 1944 – August 15, 2012) was an American aerospace engineer, entrepreneur, author and humanitarian. He is noted for founding Abiomed, the company that developed AbioCor, the first fully implantable artificial heart.

== Biography ==
Lederman was born in Bogotá, Colombia to Israel Joseph Lederman and Rifka Lederman on May 26, 1944. His parents were immigrants who escaped the Nazis in Poland. He went to Colegio Americano and Universidad de Los Andes before his family moved to the United States in 1964. He completed his bachelor's degree in engineering at Cornell University, where he also obtained his Master’s degree in Aerospace Engineering and Doctoral degree in Laser Physics and Aerospace Engineering.

=== Career ===
After graduation, Lederman went back to Colombia to work as an associate professor and director of the Universidad de Los Andes’ biomedical research department. In 1974, he relocated to the U.S. and worked for Avco Everett Research Laboratory. In this company, he was a senior research scientist working on cardiac assist technology. In 1979, he was appointed the chair of the company’s Medical Research Committee.

Lederman led a team that worked on biotechnology that extended the lives of patients awaiting heart transplants. This produced a ventricular assist device (VAD) described as a sac-type assist machine called the AVCO LVAD. This would later become the ABIOMED BVS 5000. In 1981, he founded Applied Biomedical Corp. with the aim of developing the first artificial heart. The company went public in 1987. Lederman headed it as CEO until 2004, when he was replaced by Michael Minogue.

During the early 2000s, Lederman headed the research team that developed AbioCor, a completely implantable pump. Although pulsatile, the device had no air compressor and was capable of recharging itself wirelessly and sending messages through the skin. Prior to this development, its predecessor – the Jarvik-7 – was only partially implantable and required connections to external devices. The US Food and Drug Administration approved the use of AbioCor in 2009. Outside of medical experiments, this was the first time regulators allowed the mechanical replacement of hearts for human patients.

In 2005, after 24 years as CEO of Abiomed, Lederman retired as president and chairman of the board. He published his research and gave lectures around the world. He was also known for his humanitarian activities. He funded, for instance, an initiative that supported Israeli children from Sderot while the town sustained missile attacks coming from the Gaza Strip.

On August 15, 2012, he died of pancreatic cancer at his home in Marblehead, Massachusetts. His death is said to have played a role in AbioMed's decision to abandon the production and further development of AbioCor.
