= Humanitarian Device Exemption =

A Humanitarian Device Exemption is an approval process provided by the United States Food and Drug Administration allowing a medical device to be marketed without requiring evidence of effectiveness. Generally, these are known as orphan devices. The FDA calls such a device approved in this manner a "Humanitarian Use Device" (HUD).

== Requirements ==
To qualify, the device must be intended to benefit patients with a rare disease or condition (i.e. fewer than 8,000 people in the US annually). The applicant must also show that there is no other way that the device could be brought to market, and that there is no comparable device already available.

== See also ==
- Federal Food, Drug, and Cosmetic Act
- Premarket approval
