= Extracorporeal Life Support Organization =

- Company type: non-profit organization
- Industry: Health care
- Founded: 1989
- Headquarters: Ann Arbor, MI, United States
- Revenue: 4,489,418 United States dollar (2022)
- Total assets: 6,376,770 United States dollar (2022)
- Website: http://www.elso.org/

The Extracorporeal Life Support Organization (ELSO) is a non profit organization established in 1989 supporting health care professionals and scientists who are involved in extracorporeal membrane oxygenation (ECMO). ELSO maintains a registry of both facilities and specialists trained to provide ECMO services. ELSO also maintains registry information that is used to support clinical research, support regulatory agencies, and support individual ELSO centers. ELSO provides educational programs for active centers as well as for facilities who may be involved in the transfer of patients to higher levels of care.

== ELSO Chapters ==
In addition to the North American-based ELSO organization, chapters have been developed to represent the regional needs of ELSO in the rest of the world. Current chapters include:

- Euro-ELSO – Founded in 2011 to serve the European region. Dr. Jan Belohlavek is the current chairman.
- Asia-Pacific ELSO – Founded in 2012 to serve the Asian and Pan-Pacific region. Dr. John Fraser is the current chairman.
- Latin American ELSO – Founded in 2012 to serve the Central and South American region. Dr. Leonardo Salazar is the current chairman.
- South and West Asia and Africa ELSO – Founded in 2013 to serve the Southern and Western Asian region and Africa. Dr. Yatin Mehta is the current chairman.

== ELSO Registry ==
Since 1989, ELSO has maintained a registry of clinical characteristics and outcomes of patients supported with ECMO. A history of the ELSO registry has been published and demonstrates how it evolved over time from paper documentation, to a modern database with web based data entry. Data managers at each of the ELSO centers use detailed database definitions and a point-of-entry data warning system to minimize errors in data entry, as well as full record validation triggered upon submission of the record to ensure all mandatory fields are completed. The ELSO registry has been instrumental in improving ECMO care, post-cardiac arrest management, pediatric ventricular assist devices, and organ transplantation.

The last formally published ELSO Registry report was in 2017, and contained clinical characteristics, complications, and outcomes of 78,397 patients supported with ECMO. Demonstrating the rapid growth of ECMO, at the beginning of 2020, the ELSO Registry contained information on 129,037 patients from 435 member centers across the world.

With the onset of the COVID-19 pandemic, the ELSO registry began collecting data on the worldwide use of ECMO for patients with COVID-19 and reporting this data on the ELSO website in real time. In September 2020, the outcomes of 1,035 COVID-19 patients supported with ECMO from 213 experienced centers in 36 different countries were published in The Lancet, and demonstrated 38% mortality, which is similar to many other respiratory diseases treated with ECMO.

== Recommended ECMO specialists ==
- Respiratory therapist holding a certificate as a Registered Respiratory Therapist
- Registered nurse with at least one year of intensive care unit experience.
- Clinical perfusionist graduating from a school of perfusion.

== Guidelines for care ==
ELSO promulgates guidelines for the care of patients on ECMO. They include overall guidelines about setting up a program, proper equipment, and patient care for certain medical conditions. Additional education on ECMO topics is provided through ELSO published textbooks and training manuals for ECMO specialists. ELSO recognizes centers with exceptional programs, systems, processes, and outcomes with the Award for Excellence in Life Support.

- Extracorporeal Life Support Organization (ELSO): Guidelines for Neonatal Respiratory Failure

== Position statements ==
ELSO provides position statements on:

- Organization of ECMO programs for acute respiratory failure in adult patients
- Joint Statement on Mechanical Circulatory Support in Children: A Consensus Review from the Pediatric Cardiac Intensive Care Society and ELSO
- Use of ECMO in Ebola virus disease
- Position Paper on Global Extracorporeal Membrane Oxygenation Education and Educational Agenda for the Future: A Statement From the Extracorporeal Life Support Organization ECMOed Taskforce
- Joint Society of Critical Care Medicine-Extracorporeal Life Support Organization Task Force Position Paper on the Role of the Intensivist in the Initiation and Management of Extracorporeal Membrane Oxygenation
- The ELSO Maastricht Treaty for ECLS Nomenclature: abbreviations for cannulation configuration in extracorporeal life support - a position paper of the Extracorporeal Life Support Organization
- Use of ECMO in COVID-19
