= Extracorporeal cardiopulmonary resuscitation =

Method of Cardiopulmonary resuscitation (CPR)

- Specialty: Emergency medicine, critical care medicine, cardiology

Extracorporeal cardiopulmonary resuscitation (commonly known as ECPR) is an adjunct to traditional cardiopulmonary resuscitation (CPR) that passes the patient's blood through a machine in a process to oxygenate the blood supply. A portable extracorporeal membrane oxygenation (ECMO) device is used as an adjunct to standard CPR. A patient who is deemed to be in cardiac arrest refractory to CPR has percutaneous catheters inserted into the femoral vein and artery. Theoretically, the application of ECPR allows for the return of cerebral perfusion in a more sustainable manner than with external compressions alone. By attaching an ECMO device to a person who has acutely undergone cardiovascular collapse, practitioners can maintain end-organ perfusion whilst assessing the potential reversal of causal pathology, with the goal of improving long-term survival and neurological outcomes.

== Concept ==
Similar to the concept of elective cardiopulmonary bypass, used in open heart surgery, oxygenation and perfusion can be maintained with an ECMO device in patients undergoing cardiovascular collapse. In the setting of cardiac arrest, ECPR involves percutaneous cannulation of a femoral vein and artery, followed by the activation of the device, which subsequently maintains circulation until an appropriate recovery is made.

The theory behind this invasive approach is that the artificial restoration of oxygenation and end-organ perfusion allows treating physicians more time to mitigate and reverse pathology which contributes to cardiac arrest and refractory shock. It has been well documented that the likelihood of return of spontaneous circulation and furthermore eventual discharge from hospital, after ten minutes of CPR falls significantly. Once circulation is established, the patient is able to be transferred, for further investigation and intervention, to facilities such as a cardiac cath lab and an intensive care unit.

Extracorporeal life support (ECLS) systems differ from traditional, theatre based, cardiac bypass machines in that they are portable and utilise percutaneous access as opposed to catheters which are surgically inserted into an open chest. The first access enters the femoral vein at the groin and is extended superiorly to the right atrium. The second line enters the ipsilateral or contralateral femoral artery and advanced to the distal aorta. Deoxygenated blood is removed from the right atrium prior to being pumped through the ECLS device where it is oxygenated and returned as retrograde flow to the distal aorta.

=== ECMO set-ups ===
Depending on the indication for extracorporeal membrane oxygenation, there are two common set-ups: veno-arterial (VA) and veno-venous (VV). In some instances the initial set-up can be transferred to a hybrid set-up.

== Role in medicine ==
ECPR is largely viewed as a rescue therapy, which is initiated in patients in cardiac arrest or profound circulatory shock, for whom all conventional therapies have been exhausted and death without further support is imminent. This is based on the assertion that the rapid application of ECPR can temporarily support patients with cardiovascular collapse, whilst permitting an assessment of potential options to maximise long-term survival. The American Heart Association cautiously surmises that in settings in which an experienced and accessible ECPR service is readily available, that it may be of benefit. The guidelines qualify this by advising that the patient should have had only a brief period without blood flow and that the condition resulting in the arrest be amenable to reversal i.e. hypothermia, intoxication or acute coronary insufficiency.

=== Indications ===
One of the most controversial topics associated with ECPR, is who is it indicated for. This factor has also been regarded as a major contributor of confounders to the numerous observational studies undertaken to assess to feasibility and appropriateness of ECPR.

Edecmo.org provides a simple three step criteria for patient selection when it comes to ECPR. This includes:

1. The patient was generally healthy prior to the arrest. This requires a rapid yet thorough global assessment by an experienced critical care physician.
2. Overall goals of therapy are curative.
3. The causal pathology of the cardiac arrest is thought to be reversible with an available medical or surgical intervention.

The ECPR guidelines produced by Alfred Health provides a more detailed series of indications which considers the specific indications for both out-of-hospital cardiac arrest (OOHCA) and in-hospital cardiac arrest (IHCA). - Note the following are specific to the above-mentioned site and are provided only as an example of an institution's guidelines.

==== Out-of-hospital cardiac arrest ====
Patients located within an appropriately equipped Accident and Emergency department with out-of-hospital cardiac arrest which is refractory to standard advanced cardiac life support (ACLS) treatment AND:

- The patient meets ALL the following criteria:
1. The cardiac arrest is likely to be of primary cardiac or respiratory cause
2. The cardiac arrest was witnessed by a bystander or paramedic
3. Chest compressions were commenced within 10 minutes
4. The cardiac arrest duration (collapse to arrival at E&TC) has been < 60 minutes
5. The patient is aged between 12 and 70 years
6. There are no major co-morbidities that would preclude return to independent living
- The patient is profoundly hypothermic (<32 °C) due to accidental exposure
- The patient has taken a significant overdose of a vaso-active drug(s) (e.g. beta-blocker, tricyclic acid, digoxin)
- Any other cause where there is likely to be reversibility of the cardiac arrest if an artificial circulation can be provided

==== In-hospital cardiac arrest ====
Patients with in-hospital cardiac arrest, which is refractory to standard, advanced cardiac life support (ACLS) treatment AND in whom the cause may be reversible, such as:

- The patient with suspected acute coronary syndrome who arrests in the E&TC AND does not respond to standard ACLS AND the cause is likely to be reversible with treatment in the cardiac catheterisation laboratory
- The patient in the cardiac catheterisation laboratory undergoing coronary angiography who suffers a cardiac arrest and who does not immediately respond to standard ACLS
- The patient with suspected massive pulmonary embolism
- Any other cause where there is likely to be reversibility of the underlying condition if an artificial circulation can be provided

=== Contraindications ===
No precise list of contraindications has been established, though numerous studies and guidelines have adapted a range of circumstance in which the use of ECPR would be inappropriate.

- Premorbid severe neurological impairment including stroke, dementia and traumatic brain injury
- Shock thought to be secondary to sepsis or haemorrhage
- Chest compressions not initiated within 10 minutes of commencement of cardiac arrest
- Total arrest time greater than 60 minutes
- The presence of a valid 'not for resuscitation' order
- No realistic prospect of reversal of underlying cardiac or respiratory pathology
- Advanced age precludes an extended ICU admission requiring mechanical support
- No appropriately trained or equipped staff available to initiate ECPR

=== Complications ===
The application of ECMO in any circumstance is technically difficult and invasive. The risk associated with the initial process of connecting a patient to an extracorporeal life support device is potentially exacerbated by the emergent nature of ECMO CPR.

Four recent observational studies reported complications in approximately one quarter of patients. The studies included complication of the initial application and from remaining on the extracorporeal oxygenation circuit. The complications included:

- Leg ischemia
- Bleeding
- Pneumonia
- Sepsis
- Acute kidney injury
- Pressure areas

== Initiating ECPR ==
The following protocol is an example of the site specific regime used as the basis of the CHEER trial based at the Alfred Hospital (Melbourne, Victoria).

=== Assessment ===
Once cardiac arrest is identified, cardiopulmonary resuscitation is commenced as per local resuscitation algorithms. With the assistance of emergency medical services and in hospital resuscitation teams, all patients with out-of hospital and in hospital arrests are assessed for their eligibility for ECPR. A set of criteria, specific to each ECMO site is applied whilst cardiac compressions are continued. The patients clinical history is reviewed to assess for a likely reversible cause associated with the arrest. Patients are also reviewed for the presence of contraindication such as pre-existing neurological impairment or significant limitation in ability to undertake activities of daily living. Patients who are deemed not suitable for ECPR continue on standard ALS protocols or in accordance to pre-existing advanced care directives.

=== Preparation ===
Once a patient is deemed appropriate for ECPR, the appropriate ECPR team is alerted. Patients in the CHEER trial had a mechanical compression device, the Autopulse (TM ZOLL Inc, MA USA) attached. Also specific to the CHEER trial is the infusion of 2L of ice-cold saline in an effort to induce hypothermia. The patient is intubated for ventilatory support, while they continue to be managed.

=== Cannulation ===
On confirming the appropriateness of the patient as a candidate for ECPR and once the complete ECPR has been assembled the process of cannulation begins. With a brief pause in chest compressions, a modified Seldinger technique is used to access both the femoral artery and femoral vein with the assistance of ultrasound. In the CHEER trial 15Fr arterial cannulae and 17Fr venous cannulae (Medtronic, Minneapolis, MN USA) were used. The arterial cannula is advanced to the descending aorta, whilst the venous cannula is extended to the inferior vena cava. The positions of the respective guidewires is confirmed with a chest x-ray.

=== ECMO ===
Once successful cannulation is confirmed, 5000 units of intravenous heparin is administered. The patients cannula are attached to an ECMO circuit with blood flow targets of 3Lmin^{−1} and oxygen blood flow of 3L min^{−1} commenced. An arterial blood gas is used to assess for successful oxygenation and metabolic improvement following the commencement of ECMO. In the CHEER trial, mean arterial perfusion pressures of 70mmHg were targeted. Once the patient is stabilised on the ECMO circuit, they are transferred for further management of causal pathology, for example to the cardiac catheterisation laboratory for coronary angiogram or to radiology for thrombectomy. In an effort to avoid limb ischaemia, in some centres a third cannula is inserted. This third cannula, is extended distally into the femoral artery to ensure perfusion of the lower limb. It has been well established that maintenance of therapeutic hypothermia is arrest scenarios is beneficial. In view of this, a target temperature of 33°^{C} is maintained for the first 24 hours following commencement of ECMO, with gradual rewarming occurring thereafter.

== Limitations ==
The pool of available research of efficacy is limited, with a number of retrospective observational studies and prospective case-controls studies providing the foundation of modern ECPR evidence. Due to the very nature of ECPR, the applications of a randomised control trial is largely unfeasible, thus limited the quality of data available Furthermore, in regards to logistics, ECPR is a highly sub specialised procedure which is both resource and skill intensive. As such it is expensive to initiate and to maintain and therefore has exclusively occurred in tertiary centres with a well-established ECMO service.

== In the paediatric population ==
For the past two decades ECPR has been used, in paediatric populations, to good effect. Data collected over the same period reports a rate of survival to discharge of 40%. In the pediatric population the indication for ECPR is primarily due to cardiac collapse, often associated with congenital pathology. Similarly as with adults ECMO is only indicated if reversal of the pathology for example with cardiac transplantation, is feasible. When it comes to the consideration of the withdrawal of ECMO, unlike in adult populations parents are encouraged to make the final decision with guidance from the treating physicians. The limitation associated with ECPR in the adult population, including a lack of evidence, resource intensity and the need for a well established and experienced ECPR service.
