= Extracorporeal carbon dioxide removal =

Removal of carbon dioxide from the bloodstream

Extracorporeal carbon dioxide removal (ECCO_{2}R) is the removal of carbon dioxide (CO_{2}) from the bloodstream in people who have elevated levels of carbon dioxide as a result of respiratory failure.

The use of extracorporeal carbon dioxide removal is currently considered experimental, but it has been studied in a number of situations, specifically severe exacerbations of chronic obstructive pulmonary disease and in adult respiratory distress syndrome where conventional mechanical ventilation would cause excessive lung damage.

It requires the insertion of a tube similar to a dialysis catheter into a large vein. Blood is pumped through a machine where the carbon dioxide is filtered out.
