= Extracorporeal membrane oxygenation =

Technique of providing both cardiac and respiratory support

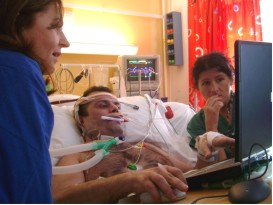
- Conscious patient on ECMO using a computer
- Other names: Extracorporeal life support (ECLS)
- ICD-10-PCS: 5A15223
- ICD-9-CM: 39.65
- MeSH: D015199
- MedlinePlus: 007234
- HCPCS-L2: 36822

Extracorporeal membrane oxygenation (ECMO) is a form of extracorporeal life support, operated by a perfusionist, providing prolonged cardiac and respiratory support to people whose heart and lungs are unable to provide an adequate amount of oxygen, gas exchange or blood supply (perfusion) to sustain life. The technology for ECMO is largely derived from cardiopulmonary bypass, which provides shorter-term support with arrested native circulation. The device used is a membrane oxygenator, also known as an artificial lung.

ECMO works by temporarily drawing blood from the body to allow artificial oxygenation of the red blood cells and removal of carbon dioxide. Generally, it is used either post-cardiopulmonary bypass or in late-stage treatment of a person with profound heart and/or lung failure, although it is now seeing use as a treatment for cardiac arrest in certain centers, allowing treatment of the underlying cause of arrest while circulation and oxygenation are supported. ECMO is also used to support patients with the acute viral pneumonia associated with COVID-19 in cases where artificial ventilation alone is not sufficient to sustain blood oxygenation levels.

== Medical uses ==
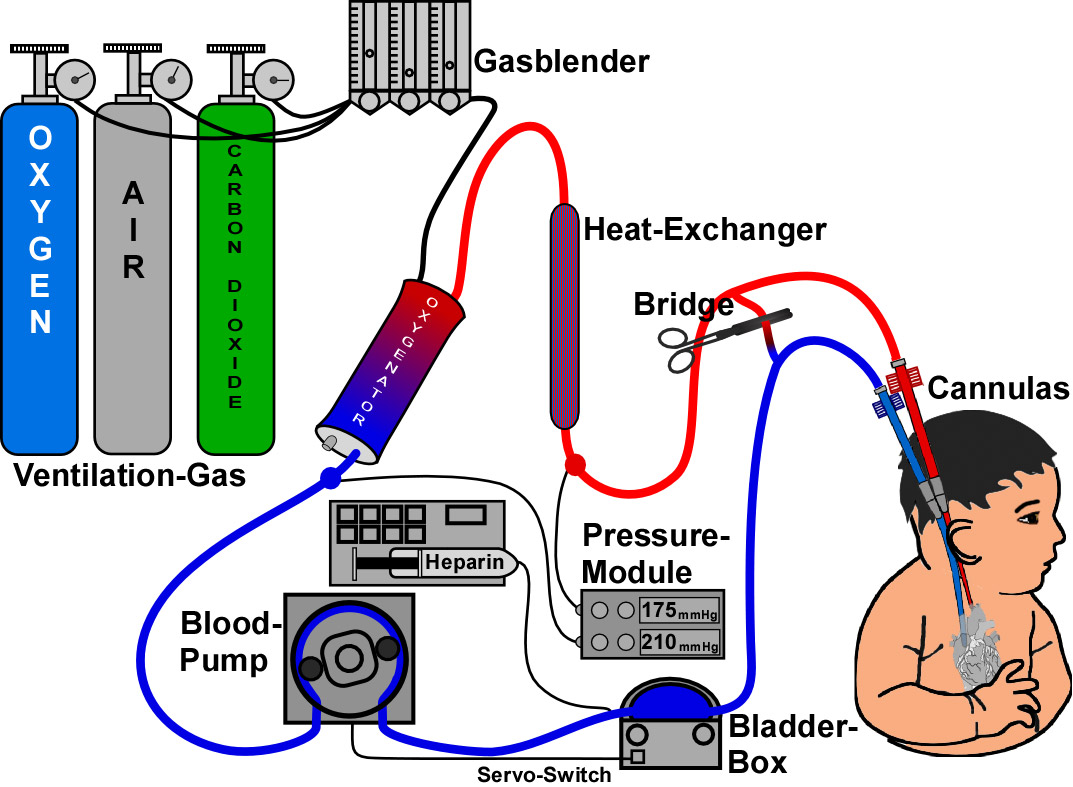
ECMO sketch

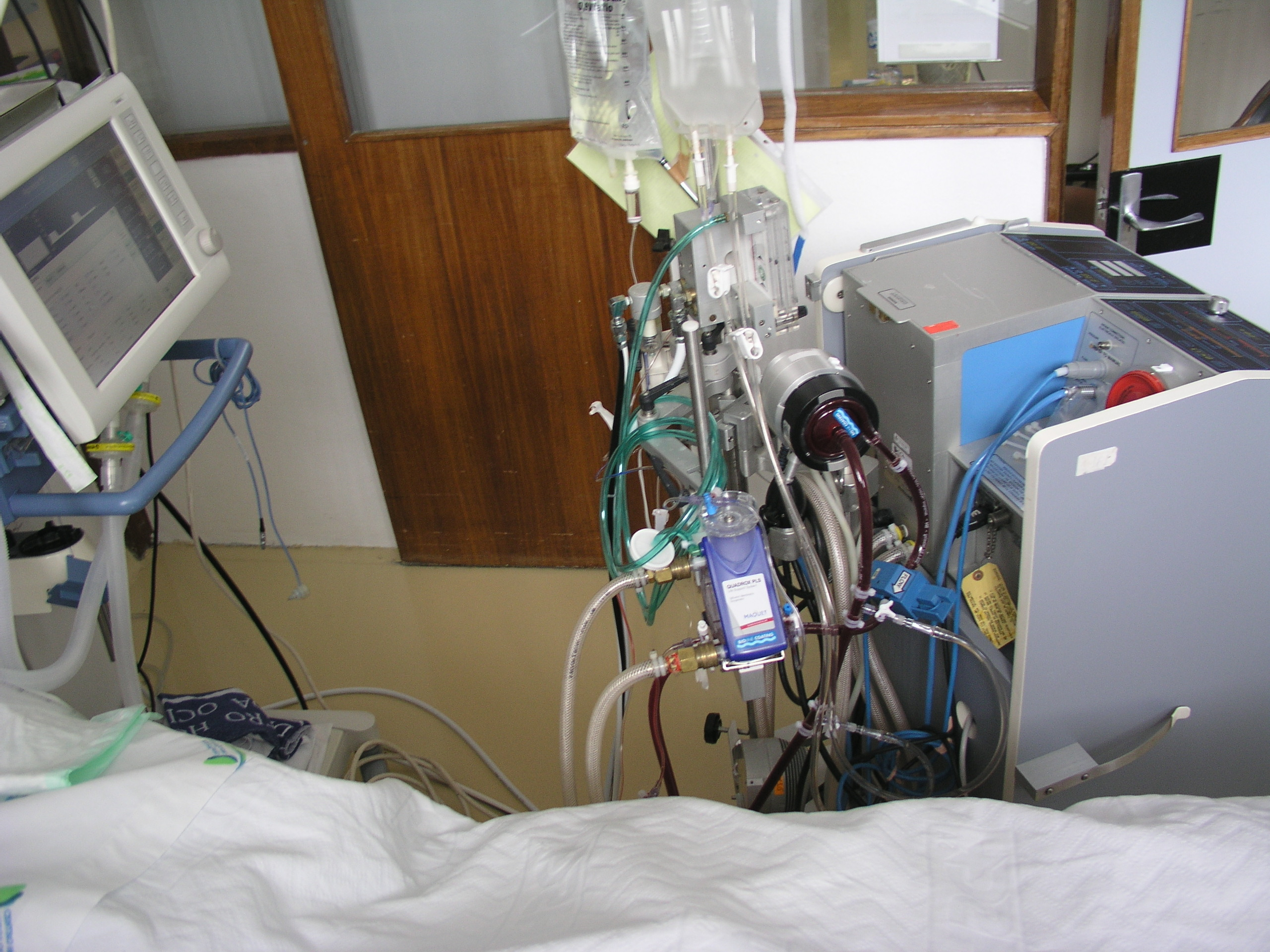
ECMO circuit

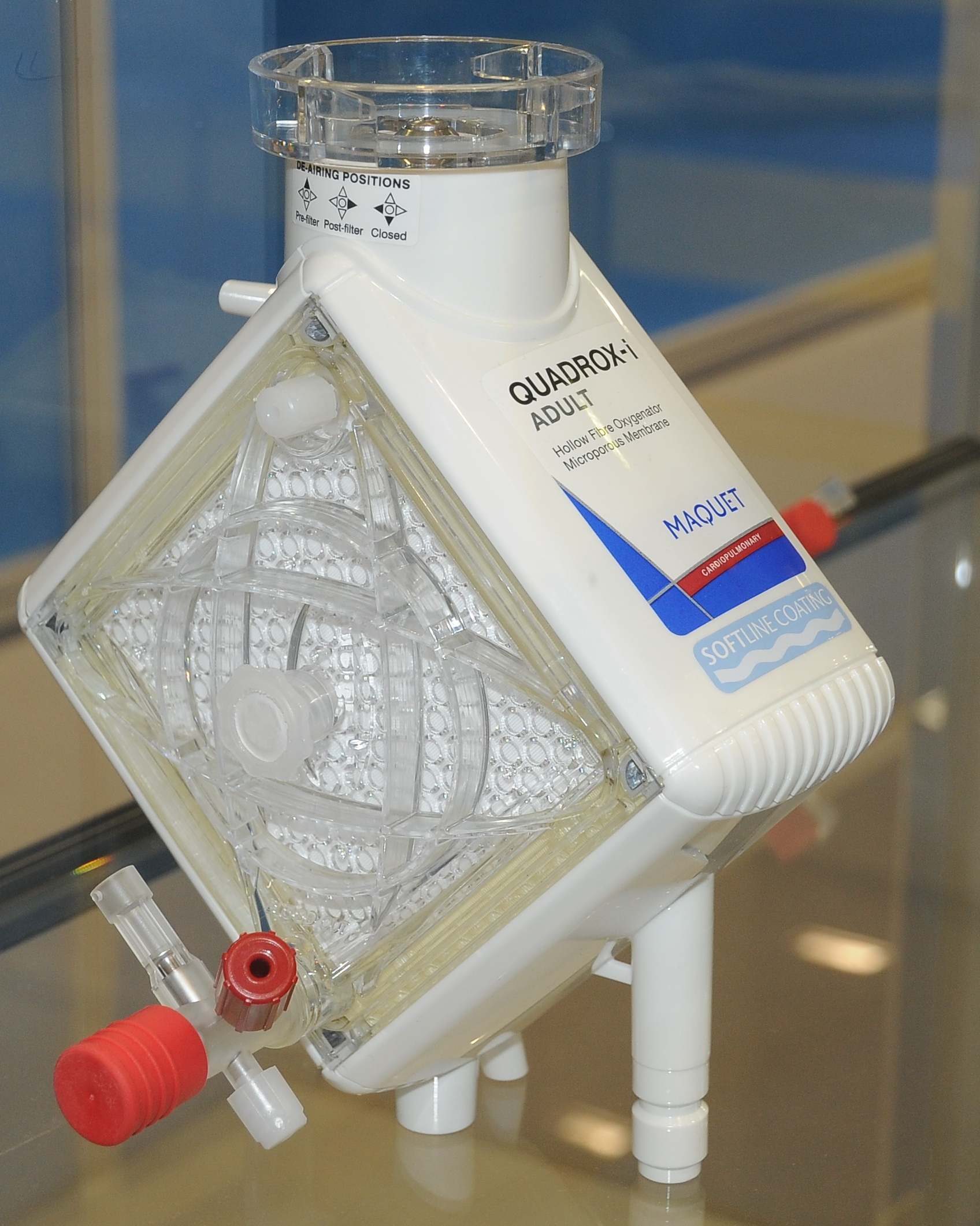
A MAQUET hollow fiber membrane oxygenator

Guidelines that describe the indications and practice of ECMO are published by the Extracorporeal Life Support Organization (ELSO). Criteria for the initiation of ECMO vary by institution, but generally include acute severe cardiac or pulmonary failure that is potentially reversible and unresponsive to conventional management. Examples of clinical situations that may prompt the initiation of ECMO include the following:

- Hypoxemic respiratory failure with a ratio of arterial oxygen tension to fraction of inspired oxygen (PaO2/FiO2) of <100 mmHg despite optimization of the ventilator settings, including the fraction of inspired oxygen (FiO2), positive end-expiratory pressure (PEEP), and inspiratory to expiratory (I:E) ratio
- Hypercapnic respiratory failure with an arterial pH <7.20
- Refractory cardiogenic shock
- Thyroid storm
- Cardiac arrest
- Failure to wean from cardiopulmonary bypass after cardiac surgery
- As a bridge to either heart transplantation or placement of a ventricular assist device
- As a bridge to lung transplantation
- Septic shock is a more controversial but increasingly studied use of ECMO
- Hypothermia, with a core temperature between 28 and 24 °C and cardiac instability, or with a core temperature below 24 °C.

In those with cardiac arrest or cardiogenic shock, it is believed to improve survival and good outcomes. However, a recent clinical trial has shown that in patients with cardiogenic shock following acute myocardial infarction, ECLS did not improve survival (as measured via 30-day mortality); on the contrary, it resulted in increased complications (e.g., major bleeding, lower limb ischemia). This finding is corroborated by a recent meta-analysis that used data from four previous clinical trials, indicating a need to reassess current guidelines for initiation of ECLS treatment.

=== COVID-19 ===
Beginning in early February 2020, doctors in China increasingly used ECMO as an adjunct support for patients presenting with acute viral pneumonia associated with SARS-CoV-2 infection (COVID-19) when, with ventilation alone, the blood oxygenation levels still remain too low to sustain the patient. Initial reports indicated that it assisted in restoring patients' blood oxygen saturation and reducing fatalities among the approximately 3% of severe cases where it was utilized. For critically ill patients, the mortality rate reduced from around 59–71% with conventional therapy to approximately 46% with extracorporeal membrane oxygenation. A March 2021 Los Angeles Times cover story illustrated the efficacy of ECMO in an extremely challenging COVID patient. In February 2021, three pregnant Israeli women who had "very serious" cases of COVID-19 were given ECMO treatment and it seemed this treatment option would continue.

=== Outcomes ===
Early studies had shown survival benefit with use of ECMO for people in acute respiratory failure especially in the setting of acute respiratory distress syndrome. A registry maintained by ELSO of nearly 51,000 people that have received ECMO has reported outcomes with 75% survival for neonatal respiratory failure, 56% survival for pediatric respiratory failure, and 55% survival for adult respiratory failure. Other observational and uncontrolled clinical trials have reported survival rates from 50 to 70%. These reported survival rates are better than historical survival rates. Even though ECMO is used for a range of conditions with varying mortality rates, early detection is key to prevent the progression of deterioration and increase survival outcomes.

Evidence indicates that ECMO reduces mortality compared with conventional management. No clear differences in outcomes have been observed across the different types of ECMO (VV, VA, or ECPR modalities), and data on other important outcomes, such as neurologic injury or quality of life, remain limited.

In the United Kingdom, veno-venous ECMO deployment is concentrated in designated ECMO centers to potentially improve care and promote better outcomes.

== Contraindications ==
Most contraindications are relative, balancing the risks of the procedure versus the potential benefits. The relative contraindications are:

- Conditions incompatible with normal life if the person recovers
- Preexisting conditions that affect the quality of life (CNS status, end-stage malignancy, risk of systemic bleeding with anticoagulation)
- Age and size
- Futility: those who are too sick, have been on conventional therapy too long, or have a fatal diagnosis.

== Side effects and complications ==
=== Neurologic ===
A common consequence in ECMO-treated adults is neurological injury, which may include intracerebral hemorrhage, subarachnoid hemorrhage, ischemic infarctions in susceptible areas of the brain, hypoxic-ischemic encephalopathy, unexplained coma, and brain death. Bleeding occurs in 30 to 40% of those receiving ECMO and can be life-threatening. It is due to both the necessary continuous heparin infusion and platelet dysfunction. Meticulous surgical technique, maintaining platelet counts greater than 100,000/mm^{3}, and maintaining the target activated clotting time reduce the likelihood of bleeding.

=== Blood ===
ECMO is associated with an increased risk of major bleeding compared with conventional management. Heparin-induced thrombocytopenia (HIT) is increasingly common among people receiving ECMO. When HIT is suspected, the heparin infusion is usually replaced by a non-heparin anticoagulant.

There is retrograde blood flow in the descending aorta whenever the femoral artery and vein are used for VA (Veno-Arterial) ECMO. Stasis of the blood can occur if left ventricular output is not maintained, which may result in thrombosis.

=== Bridge-to-assist device ===
In VA ECMO, those whose cardiac function does not recover sufficiently to be weaned from ECMO may be bridged to a ventricular assist device (VAD) or transplant. A variety of complications can occur during cannulation, including vessel perforation with bleeding, arterial dissection, distal ischemia, and incorrect location.

=== Children ===
Preterm infants, having inefficiency of the heart and lungs, are at unacceptably high risk for intraventricular hemorrhage (IVH) if ECMO is performed at a gestational age less than 32 weeks.

=== Infections ===
The prevalence of hospital-acquired infections during ECMO is 10-12% (higher compared to other critically ill patients). Coagulase-negative staphylococci, Candida spp., Enterobacteriaceae and Pseudomonas aeruginosa are the most frequently involved pathogens. ECMO patients display a high incidence of ventilator-associated pneumonia (24.4 cases/1000 ECMO days), with a major role played by Enterobacteriaceae. The infectious risk was shown to increase along the duration of the ECMO run, which is the most important risk factor for the development of infections. Other ECMO-specific factors predisposing to infections include the severity of illness in ECMO patients, the high risk of bacterial translocation from the gut and ECMO-related impairment of the immune system. Another important issue is the microbial colonisation of catheters, ECMO cannulae and the oxygenator.

== Types ==
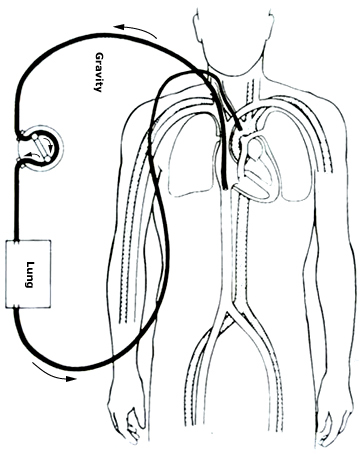
Veno-arterial (VA) ECMO for cardiac or respiratory failure.

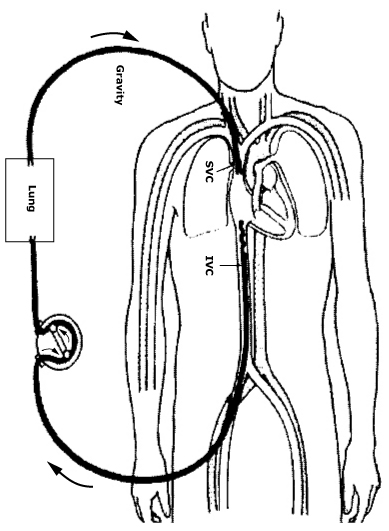
Veno-venous (VV) ECMO for respiratory failure.

There are several forms of ECMO; the two most common are veno-arterial (VA) ECMO and veno-venous (VV) ECMO. In both modalities, blood drained from the venous system is oxygenated outside of the body. In VA ECMO, this blood is returned to the arterial system and in VV ECMO the blood is returned to the venous system. In VV ECMO, no cardiac support is provided.

=== Veno-arterial ===
In veno-arterial (VA) ECMO, a venous cannula is usually placed in the right or left common femoral vein for extraction, and an arterial cannula is usually placed into the right or left femoral artery for infusion. The tip of the femoral venous cannula should be maintained near the junction of the inferior vena cava and right atrium, while the tip of the femoral arterial cannula is maintained in the iliac artery. In adults, accessing the femoral artery is preferred because the insertion is simpler. Central VA ECMO may be used if cardiopulmonary bypass has already been established or emergency re-sternotomy has been performed (with cannulae in the right atrium (or SVC/IVC for tricuspid repair) and ascending aorta).

VA ECMO is typically reserved when native cardiac function is minimal to mitigate increased cardiac stroke work associated with pumping against retrograde flow delivered by the aortic cannula.

=== Veno-venous ===
In veno-venous (VV) ECMO, cannulae are usually placed in the right common femoral vein for drainage and right internal jugular vein for infusion. Alternatively, a dual-lumen catheter is inserted into the right internal jugular vein, draining blood from the superior and inferior vena cavae and returning it to the right atrium.

== Initiation ==
ECMO should be performed only by clinicians with training and experience in its initiation, maintenance, and discontinuation. ECMO insertion is typically performed in the operating room setting by a cardiothoracic surgeon. ECMO management is commonly performed by a registered nurse, respiratory therapist, or a perfusionist. Once it has been decided to initiate ECMO, the patient is anticoagulated with intravenous heparin to prevent thrombus formation from clotting off the oxygenator. Prior to initiation, an IV bolus of heparin is given and measured to ensure that the activated clotting time (ACT) is between 300 and 350 seconds. Once the ACT is between this range, ECMO can be initiated and a heparin drip will be started after as a maintenance dose.

=== Cannulation ===
Cannulae can be placed percutaneously by the Seldinger technique, a relatively straightforward and common method for obtaining access to blood vessels, or via surgical cutdown. The largest cannulae that can be placed in the vessels are used in order to maximize flow and minimize shear stress. However, limb ischemia is one of the notorious complications of ECMO but can be avoided utilizing a proper distal limb perfusion method. In addition, ECMO can be used intraoperatively during lung transplantation to stabilize the patient with excellent outcomes.

ECMO required for complications post-cardiac surgery can be placed directly into the appropriate chambers of the heart or great vessels. Peripheral (femoral or jugular) cannulation can allow patients awaiting lung transplantation to remain awake and ambulatory with improved post-transplant outcomes.

=== Titration ===
Following cannulation and connection to the ECMO circuit, the appropriate amount of blood flow through the ECMO circuit is determined using hemodynamic parameters and physical exam. Goals of maintaining end-organ perfusion via ECMO circuit are balanced with sufficient physiologic blood flow through the heart to prevent stasis and subsequent formation of blood clot.

== Maintenance ==
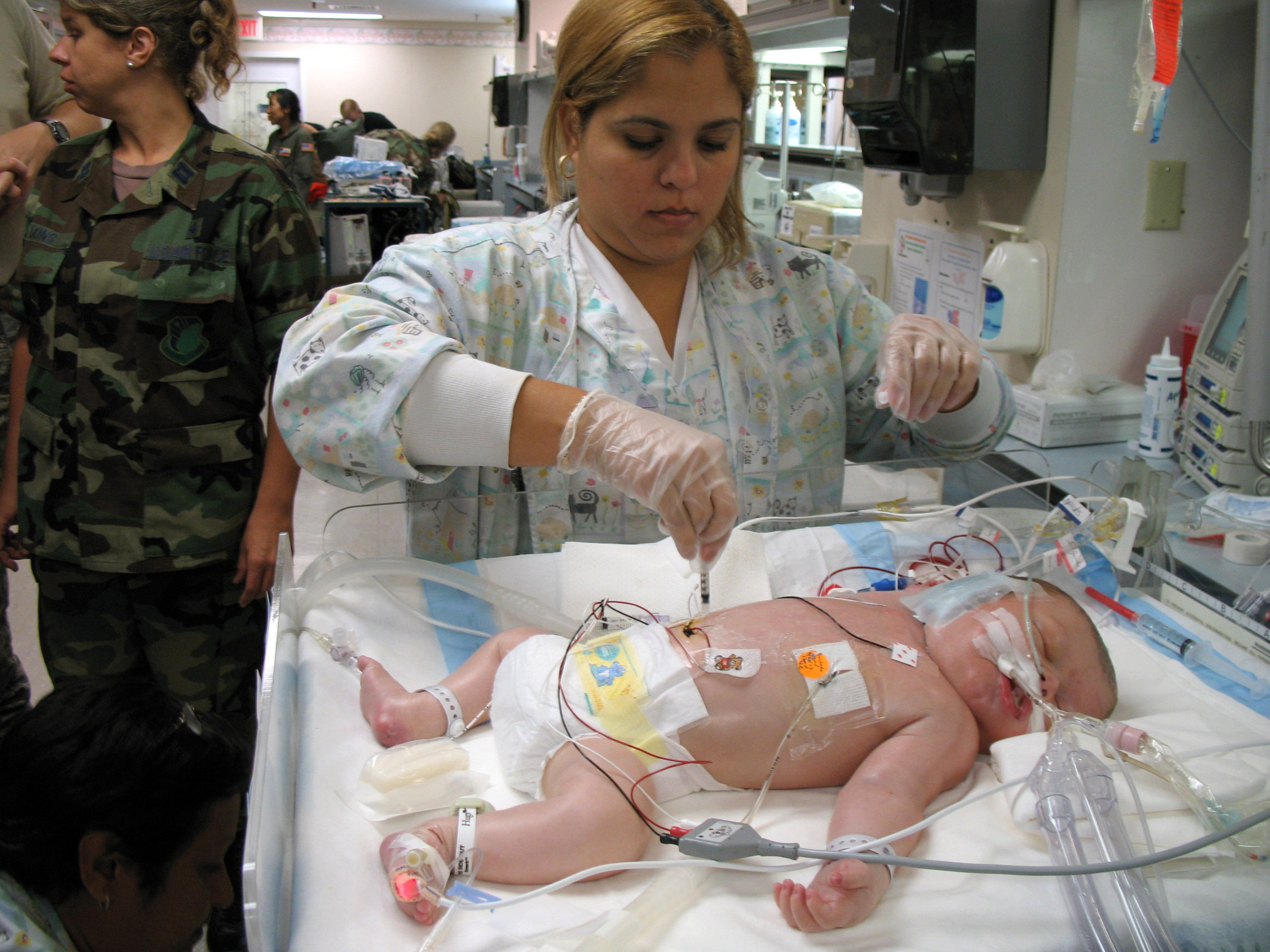
A respiratory therapist takes a blood sample from a newborn in preparation for ECMO therapy.

Once the initial respiratory and hemodynamic goals have been achieved, the blood flow is maintained at that rate. Frequent assessment and adjustments are facilitated by continuous venous oximetry, which directly measures the oxyhemoglobin saturation of the blood in the venous limb of the ECMO circuit.

=== Special considerations ===
VV ECMO is typically used for respiratory failure, while VA ECMO is used for cardiac failure. There are unique considerations for each type of ECMO, which influence management.

==== Blood flow ====
High flow rates are usually desired during VV ECMO to optimize oxygen delivery. In contrast, the flow rate used during VA ECMO must be high enough to provide adequate perfusion pressure and venous oxyhemoglobin saturation (measured on drainage blood) but low enough to provide sufficient preload to maintain left ventricular output.

==== Diuresis ====
Since most people are fluid-overloaded when ECMO is initiated, aggressive diuresis is warranted once the patient is stable on ECMO. Ultrafiltration can be easily added to the ECMO circuit if the patient has inadequate urine output. ECMO "chatter", or instability of ECMO waveforms, represents under-resuscitation and would support cessation of aggressive diuresis or ultrafiltration. There is an increased risk of acute kidney injury related to the use of ECMO and systemic inflammatory response.

==== Left ventricular monitoring ====
Left ventricular output is rigorously monitored during VA ECMO because left ventricular function can be impaired from increased afterload, which can in turn lead to formation of thrombus within the heart.

== Weaning and discontinuing ==
For those with respiratory failure, improvements in radiographic appearance, pulmonary compliance, and arterial oxyhemoglobin saturation indicate that the person may be ready to be taken off ECMO support. For those with cardiac failure, enhanced aortic pulsatility correlates with improved left ventricular output and indicates that they may be ready to be taken off ECMO support. If all markers are in good status, the blood flows on the ECMO will be slowly decreased and the patients parameters will be observed during this time to ensure that the patient can tolerate the changes. When the flows are below 2 liters per minute, permanent removal is attempted and the patient is continuously monitored during this time until the cannulae can be removed.

=== Veno-venous ECMO liberation trial ===
VV ECMO trials are performed by eliminating all countercurrent sweep gas through the oxygenator. Extracorporeal blood flow remains constant, but gas transfer does not occur. They are then observed for several hours, during which the ventilator settings that are necessary to maintain adequate oxygenation and ventilation off ECMO are determined as indicated by arterial and venous blood gas results.

=== Veno-arterial ECMO liberation trial ===
VA ECMO trials require temporary clamping of both the drainage and infusion lines, while allowing the ECMO circuit to circulate through a bridge between the arterial and venous limbs. This prevents thrombosis of stagnant blood within the ECMO circuit. In addition, the arterial and venous lines should be flushed continuously with heparinized saline or intermittently with heparinized blood from the circuit. In general, VA ECMO trials are shorter in duration than VV ECMO trials because of the higher risk of thrombus formation.

== History ==
ECMO was developed in the 1950s by John Gibbon, and then by C. Walton Lillehei. The first use for neonates was in 1965.

Banning Gray Lary first demonstrated that intravenous oxygen could maintain life. His results were published in Surgical Forum in November 1951. Lary commented on his initial work in a 2007 presentation wherein he writes, "Our research began by assembling an apparatus that, for the first time, kept animals alive while breathing pure nitrogen. This was accomplished with very small bubbles of oxygen injected into the blood stream. These bubbles were made by adding a 'wetting agent' to oxygen being forced through a porcelain filter into the venous blood stream. Shortly after its initial presentation to the American College of Surgeons, this apparatus was reviewed by Walton Lillehei who with DeWall made the first practical heart[–]lung machine that employed a bubble oxygenator. With variations such machines were used for the next twenty years."

== Manufacturers ==
- Medtronic
- Maquet (Getinge Group)
- Xenios AG (Fresenius Medical Care)
- Sorin Group
- Terumo
- Nipro
- MicroPort

== Availability by country ==
| Country/territory | Continent | Hospitals equipped | Units |
|---|---|---|---|
| United States | North America | 361 (in 2022) | |
| Canada | North America | 23 (in 2022) | |
| Australia | Oceania | | 146 (in 2020) |
| Brazil | South America | 21 (in 2021) | |
| England and Wales | Europe | 5 (in 2020) | 15 (in 2020) |
| Northern Ireland | Europe | 0 (in 2020) | 0 (in 2020) |
| Scotland | Europe | 1 (in 2020) | 6 (in 2020) |
| Ireland | Europe | 1 (in 2024) | 2 (in 2024) |
| Germany | Europe | 214 (in 2020) | 779 (in 2021) |
| Poland | Europe | | 47 (in 2020) |
| Sweden | Europe | | 7 or more (in 2020) |
| Albania | Europe | 0 (in 2020) | 0 (in 2020) |
| Russia | Europe | | 124 + 17 (in 2020) |
| Moscow | Europe | | 16 (in 2020) |
| Saint Petersburg, Russia | Europe | 7 | 19 (in 2020) |
| Japan | Asia | | 2208 (in 2020) |
| Mainland China | Asia | | 400 (approx. in 2020) 2,857 (in 2023) |
| South Korea | Asia | | 350 (in 2023) |
| Taiwan | Asia | 51 (in 2016) | 105 (in 2016) 129 (including rental units, in 2016) |
| Sri Lanka | South Asia | 2 (in 2021) | 2 (in 2021) |

== Research ==
=== Randomized controlled trials (RCTs) ===
Four randomized controlled trials (RCTs) have been conducted to evaluate the effectiveness of ECMO in respiratory failure patients. Early trials conducted by Zapol et al. and Morris et al. were plagued by technical challenges related to the ECMO technology available in the 1970s and 1990s. The CESAR and EOLIA trials utilized modern ECMO systems and are considered the central ECMO RCTs.

==== CESAR Trial (2009) ====
The Conventional Ventilatory Support vs. Extracorporeal Membrane Oxygenation for Severe Adult Respiratory Failure (CESAR) Trial was a UK-based multicenter RCT aiming to evaluate the safety, efficacy and cost effectiveness of ECMO compared to conventional mechanical ventilation in adults with severe but reversible respiratory failure. Death or severe disability at 6 months or prior to hospital discharge was the primary outcome. The primary outcome was analyzed by intention to treat only. Economic analysis included quality-adjusted life-years (QALYs), analysis of cost generating events, cost-utility 6-months post-randomization and modelling of life-time cost utility. The trial planned to enroll 180 patients; 90 to each arm.

The Trial met its enrollment goal of 180 patients. 68 of the 90 (75%) of the patients intended to be treated with ECMO were actually treated with ECMO. Survival of patients allocated to the ECMO group (i.e. referred for consideration for treatment with ECMO) was significantly higher than patients allocated to the conventional ventilation group (63% vs 47%, p=0.03). The referral to ECMO group gained 0.03 QALY compared to the conventional ventilation group at the 6-month follow-up. The referral to ECMO group had longer lengths of stay and higher costs.

No standardized treatment protocol for the conventional ventilation group is the main limitation of the CESAR study. The trial authors note that this occurred due to the inability of enrolling sites to agree on a protocol. This resulted in control patients not receiving lung protective ventilation which is known to improve mortality in ARDS patients.

The authors conclude that referral of patients with severe, potentially reversible respiratory failure to an ECMO center can significantly improve 6-month, severe disability free survival. The CESAR trial results do provide a direct survival comparison for treatment with ECMO versus conventional mechanical ventilation alone since only 75% of the ECMO group were actually treated with ECMO.

==== EOLIA Trial (2018) ====
The ECMO to Rescue Lung Injury in Severe ARDS (EOLIA) Trial was designed to evaluate the effects of early ECMO initiation compared to continued standard of care (conventional mechanical ventilation) in severe ARDS patients. Mortality at 60 days was the primary endpoint. The calculated sample size was 331 patients with an intent to show a 20% reduction in absolute mortality in the ECMO group. The main secondary endpoint was treatment failure – cross-over to ECMO due to refractory hypoxemia or death in the control group and death in the ECMO group.

Following the fourth planned interim analysis the trial was ended due to futility. A total of 249 patients were enrolled at study termination. Thirty-five control group patients (28%) required emergency cross-over to ECMO. Results of EOLIA demonstrated no significant difference in 60-day mortality between the ECMO group and the control group (35% vs 46%, respectively). The interpretation of this result however is complicated by the cross-over patients. The secondary endpoint, treatment failure, demonstrated a relative risk of 0.62 (p<0.001) in favor of the ECMO group. Results of the secondary endpoint should be interpreted cautiously due to the primary end point results. With respect to safety, the ECMO group had significantly higher rates of severe thrombocytopenia and bleeding requiring transfusion, but lower rates of ischemic stroke.

The primary limitation to the EOLIA Trial was that it was underpowered. For EOLIA to have been properly powered to detect significance of an 11% reduction in mortality a total of 624 patients would need to have been enrolled. Such a trial would take 9 years based on the EOLIA recruitment rates and is likely not feasible.

The main conclusion the study authors drew from these results is that early ECMO initiation in severe ARDS patients does not provide a mortality benefit compared to continued standard of care treatment. Subsequent editorials by key opinion leaders suggest that the practical implication is that ECMO may improve mortality if used as a rescue therapy for patients failing conventional ARDS therapies.
