= Outline of biomedical engineering =

Application of engineering principles and design concepts to medicine and biology

The following outline is provided as an overview of and topical guide to biomedical engineering:

Biomedical engineering (BME) or medical engineering is the application of engineering principles and design concepts to medicine and biology for healthcare applications (e.g., diagnostic or therapeutic purposes). BME also integrates the logical sciences to advance health care treatment, including diagnosis, monitoring, and therapy. Also included under the scope of a biomedical engineer is the management of current medical equipment in hospitals while adhering to relevant industry standards. This involves procurement, routine testing, preventive maintenance, and making equipment recommendations, a role also known as a Biomedical Equipment Technician (BMET) or as a clinical engineer.

Biomedical engineering has recently emerged as its own field of engineering, as compared to many other engineering fields. Such an evolution is common as a new field transitions from being an interdisciplinary specialization among already-established fields to being considered a field in itself. Much of the work in biomedical engineering consists of research and development, spanning a broad array of subfields (see below). Prominent biomedical engineering applications include the development of biocompatible prostheses, various diagnostic and therapeutic medical devices ranging from clinical equipment to micro-implants, imaging technologies such as MRI and EKG/ECG, regenerative tissue growth, and the development of pharmaceutical drugs including biopharmaceuticals.

== What type of thing is biomedical engineering? ==
- Science
  - Applied science
    - Engineering
    - Medicine
- Interdisciplinary field
- Health technology
- Life sciences

== Branches of biomedical engineering ==
- Bioinstrumentation
- Biomaterials engineering
- Biomechanics
- Biomedical imaging
- Biomolecular engineering
- Bionanotechnology
- Biophotonics
- Biosensors
- Clinical engineering
- Human factors engineering
- Neural engineering
- Regenerative medicine
- Rehabilitation engineering
- Systems biology
- Tissue engineering

== Design considerations ==
- Biocompatibility
- Ergonomics
- Surface and bulk erosion

=== Materials ===
- Acellular dermis
- Bioceramic
- Biomimetic material
- Porous silicon

== Techniques and methods ==
- Biomedical optics
- Computational anatomy
- Computational modeling
- Bayesian model of computational anatomy
- Diffeomorphometry
- Elementary modes
- Finite element method
- Group actions in computational anatomy
- Krogh length
- Laboratory automation
- Large deformation diffeomorphic metric mapping
- Mathematical modeling
- Mechatronics
- Metabolic network modelling
- MOWChIP-seq
- Photoacoustic flow cytometry
- Riemannian metric and Lie bracket in computational anatomy
- Signal processing

== Biomedical technologies ==
- Applied Spectral Imaging
- Artificial intelligence in healthcare
  - Machine learning in medicine
- Bioinformatics
- Bio-MEMS
- Biotelemetry
- Computed tomography
- Digital health
- Heart rate monitor
- Hexoskin
- Implant
- Implantable loop recorder
- Laser speckle contrast imaging
- Magnetic resonance imaging
- Materialise Mimics
- Medical instrumentation
- Microfluidics
- MicroRNA biosensors
- Molecular imaging
- Nanorobotics
- Optomyography
- Photoacoustic imaging
- ScanIP
- Sensory substitution
- Stent-electrode recording array
- Telemedicine
- Totally implantable cochlear implant
- Ultrasound
- Wearable technology
- X-ray

== Applications of biomedical engineering ==
- Argus retinal prosthesis
- Artificial organ
- Assistive technology
- Automated insulin delivery system
- Cardiac pacemaker
- Cell encapsulation
- Cochlear implant
- Custom-made medical device
- E-NABLE
- EpiBone
- External support
- Heart rate monitor
- Implant
- Implantable loop recorder
- Michelangelo Hand
- Kidney dialysis
- Needle remover
- NeuroArm
- Orthotics
- Pacemaker
- Prosthetics
- Retinal implant
- Sensory substitution
- Stent
- Stent-electrode recording array
- Surgical robot
- Totally implantable cochlear implant

== History of biomedical engineering ==
- Alfred E. Mann Institute for Biomedical Engineering
- Ending Aging
- Fantastic Voyage: Live Long Enough to Live Forever
- Strategies for engineered negligible senescence
- Whitaker Foundation

== Research areas ==
- Biothermia
- Data analysis
- Molecular diagnostics
- Omics
  - Genomics
  - Proteomics
  - Metabolomics
- Predictive analytics

== Biomedical engineering in healthcare systems ==
- Biotelemetry
- Health systems engineering
- Medical equipment management
- Remote monitoring
- Telehealth

== Ethical and regulatory considerations ==
- Biomedical ethics
- Clinical trial
- Custom-made medical device
- Medical ethics
- Patient privacy
- Research ethics

== Awards in biomedical engineering ==
- IEEE Biomedical Engineering Award
- Robert A. Pritzker Distinguished Lecture Award

== Biomedical engineering publications ==
- Annual Review of Biomedical Engineering
- Biomedical Engineering: Applications, Basis and Communications
- Biomedical Engineering Online
- BMC Biomedical Engineering
- Critical Reviews in Biomedical Engineering
- International Journal for Numerical Methods in Biomedical Engineering
- Nature Biomedical Engineering

== Biomedical engineering organizations ==
- Biomedical Engineering Society
- International Federation for Medical and Biological Engineering
- American Institute for Medical and Biological Engineering
- Canadian Medical and Biological Engineering Society
- Cardiovascular System Dynamics Society
- SENSE lab
- Terumo Penpol

== Biomedical engineering education ==
- Bachelor of Science in Biomedical Engineering
- Case Western Reserve University Department of Biomedical Engineering
- Department of Biomedical Engineering (Johns Hopkins University)
- Lurie Biomedical Engineering Center
- Virginia Tech - Wake Forest University School of Biomedical Engineering & Sciences
- Wallace H. Coulter Department of Biomedical Engineering
- Weldon School of Biomedical Engineering

== Persons influential in biomedical engineering ==
- Robert Langer
- Patricia Bath
- Yuan-Cheng Fung
- Shuvo Roy
- Sangeeta Bhatia
- Léon Croizat
- P. Jackson Darlington Jr.
- Alfred Russel Wallace
- E. O. Wilson

== See also ==
- Index of biomedical engineering articles
- Outline of medicine
- Outline of biology
- Outline of engineering
