= List of polymer classes =

This list of polymer classes includes categories of polymers distinguished by characteristics such as their origin, chemical composition, molecular structure, or material properties:

- Biopolymer
- Inorganic polymer
- Organic polymer
- Conductive polymer
- Copolymer
- Fluoropolymer
- Gutta-percha (Polyterpene)
- Phenolic resin
- Polyanhydrides
- Polyketone
- Polyester
- Polyolefin (Polyalkene)
- Rubber
- Silicone
- Silicone rubber
- Superabsorbent polymer
- Synthetic rubber
- Vinyl polymer
