= Elaine Scott =

Elaine Scott may refer to:

- Elaine P. Scott (born 1957), American engineer
- Elaine Anderson Steinbeck, American actress and stage producer also known as Elaine Anderson Scott
- Elaine Scott (producer), Canadian television producer of Starhunter and A Friend of the Family
- Elaine Scott (writer), 1999 Science Writing Award winner
