= FPB =

FPB may refer to:

- FPB (band), a Czech punk rock band
- Fast patrol boat
- Federal Planning Bureau of Belgium
- Federation of Trade Unions of Belarus
- Femoropopliteal bypass, a type of surgery
- Fibrinopeptide B, a compound in coagulation
- Film and Publication Board, in South Africa
- First Pacific Bank, a Hong Kong bank
- First Premier Bank, headquartered in Sioux Falls, South Dakota, U.S.
- Forum of Private Business, in the United Kingdom
- Four-point flexural test, or four-point bending test, in mechanical characterization
- Popular Forces of Burundi (French: Forces populaires du Burundi), a Congolese rebel group
- Portuguese Basketball Federation (Portuguese: Federação Portuguesa de Basquetebol)
