= C. Balagopal =

Indian industrialist and author (born 1952)

- Born: Balagopal Chandrasekhar; 2 October 1952 (age 74); Kollam, Kerala, India
- Education: B.A. and M.A. in economics, Loyola College, Chennai; University of Madras
- Occupations: Entrepreneur, author and former civil servant
- Known for: Founder of Terumo Penpol

Balagopal Chandrasekhar (born 2 October 1952), better known as C. Balagopal, is an Indian entrepreneur, author and former Indian Administrative Service officer. He founded Peninsula Polymers, also known as Penpol, India's first blood-bag manufacturing company. It later became Terumo Penpol after a joint venture with the Japanese company Terumo. He served as part-time chairman of Federal Bank from November 2021 to June 2023. In September 2024, he was appointed chairman of the Kerala State Industrial Development Corporation (KSIDC).

== Early life and education ==
Balagopal was born in Kollam, Kerala. He spent much of his childhood on tea and rubber estates in the Nilgiri Hills and Wayanad, where his father worked as a manager. He attended The Lawrence School, Lovedale, studied economics at Loyola College, and completed a master's degree in economics from the University of Madras. He later joined a doctoral programme at the University of Kerala.

== Career ==
Balagopal passed the civil services examination in 1976 and joined the IAS in 1977. He was allotted the Manipur cadre and first worked in Tamenglong. He later served in Ukhrul and Imphal West. In 1980, he went on deputation to Kerala, where he served as a sub-divisional officer in Kollam and later worked in a state public-sector undertaking. He resigned from the service in 1983.

After leaving the IAS, Balagopal founded Peninsula Polymers, also known as Penpol, to manufacture biomedical devices using technology developed by the Sree Chitra Tirunal Institute for Medical Sciences and Technology (SCTIMST). The company was incorporated in 1985, and its first blood-bag plant began production in 1987. In 1999, Penpol formed a joint venture with Terumo Corporation and became Terumo Penpol. The company became one of the largest manufacturers of blood-bag systems and exported its products to more than 50 countries. Balagopal sold his stake to Terumo in 2011 and stepped down as managing director in 2013.

After leaving Terumo Penpol, Balagopal became an investor and mentor to start-ups. He has served on the board of TIMed, the medical-device incubator at SCTIMST. He and his wife, Vinita Nambiar, also set up the ANAHA Trust, which supports health, education and rural livelihood projects in Kerala and Manipur.

Balagopal served as an independent director on the board of Federal Bank and was its part-time chairman from 22 November 2021 to 28 June 2023. He was appointed chairman of KSIDC in September 2024 and continues to hold the post.

== Works ==
Balagopal's books cover his years in public service and the growth of industry in Kerala. His first book was based on his time as a young officer in Manipur.

- On a Clear Day You Can See India: The Little World of the District Official (2013)
- The View from Kollam: A Day in the Life of a Sub-collector (2015)
- Maveli & Markets: How Supplyco Held the Price Line (2019)
- Below the Radar: The Untold Story of How Modern Manufacturing Grew by Stealth in Kerala (2023)

== Awards ==
In 1995, Balagopal received the National R&D Award for the successful commercialisation of indigenous technology from the Ministry of Science and Technology.
