= VGF (disambiguation) =

VGF may refer to:

- VGF, a secreted protein and neuropeptide precursor
- Vereinigte Glanzstoff-Fabriken, the German rayon manufacturer
- Vein graft failure, a condition in which vein grafts, which are used as alternative conduits in bypass surgeries, get occluded
- Aerovista Gulf Express, the ICAO code VGF
- Viability gap funding, a grant to support projects
