= Index of biomedical engineering articles =

Articles related specifically to biomedical engineering include:

== A ==
Acoustic engineering — Aldehyde-stabilized cryopreservation — American Institute for Medical and Biological Engineering — Angiogenesis — Animal testing alternatives — Annual Review of Biomedical Engineering — Antibody engineering — Artificial cells — Artificial gene synthesis — Artificial heart — Artificial heart valve — Artificial intelligence — Artificial limb — Artificial muscles — Artificial organ — Artificial pacemaker — Artificial skin — Artificial uterus — Assistive technology — Automated external defibrillator

== B ==
Bachelor of Science in Biomedical Engineering — Bio-implants — Biochemistry — Biochemistry topics list — Bioelectrochemistry — Bioelectronics — Bioethics — Biofabrication — Bioimpedance — Bioinformatics — Bioinstrumentation — Biology — Biology topics list — Biomechanics — Biomedical engineering — Biomedical imaging — Biomedical Imaging Resource — Bionics — Bioprinting — Biostatistics — Biotechnology — Biotechnology law — Biotelemetry — Biothermia — Blood substitutes — BMES — Body area network — Brain–computer interface — Brain implant — Brain mapping

== C ==
Cancer immunotherapy — Cell culture — Cell engineering — Chemistry — Chemistry topics list — Clinical engineering — Cochlear implant — Cognitive neuroscience — Computational neuroscience — Controlled drug delivery — Corrective lens — Crutch — Cryobiology — Cryonics — Cryotechnology — Cytotechnology

== D ==
De-extinction — Dental implant — Dialysis machines — Diagnostic medical sonography — Diaphragmatic pacemaker — DNA Sequencing — Drug delivery — Drug design

== E ==
Electrocardiography — Electroencephalography — Engineering — Engineered uterus

== F ==
Flow cytometry — Food and Drug Administration — Forensic engineering — Functional electrical stimulation — Functional magnetic resonance imaging — Fractal analysis

== G ==
Gait analysis — Gene delivery — Genetic engineering — Genetically modified animal — Genetically modified organism — Genetic engineering topics — Gene therapy — Genetic engineering — Genetics — Genome engineering — Glycomics — Glycoproteomics

== H ==
Head transplant — Health care — Health informatics — Hearing aid — Heart-lung machine — Heart rate monitor — Histology — Histopathology — Human body — Human enhancement — Human Genome Project — Human genetic engineering — Hydrogel

== I ==
Immunotherapy — Implantable medical devices — Implantable cardioverter-defibrillator — In vivo imaging — Industrial biotechnology — Infusion pump — Inhaler — Insulin pump — Interferometry — Intracranial pressure monitoring — Isolated brain

== J ==
Joint replacement

== K ==
Kinematics — Kinesiology — Kinetics — Knee replacement

== L ==
Lab-on-a-chip — Laparoscopic surgery Laser medicine — Life extension — Liver dialysis

== M ==
Magnetic resonance imaging — Mammography — Maxillo-facial prosthetics — Mechanical ventilation — Medical equipment — Medical imaging — Medical physics — Medical software — Medical research — Medication — Medicine — Microfluidics — Microscopy — Minimally invasive procedures — Molecular biology — Molecular diagnostics — Molecular target — Molecular biology topics — Monoclonal antibody therapy

== N ==
Natural language processing — Nano-scaffold — Nanoengineering — Nanofluidics — Nanomedicine — Nanosensor — Nanotechnology — Nanotoxicology — Neonatal intensive care unit — Neural engineering — Neural decoding — Neural networks — Neurally controlled animat — Neuroengineering — Neuroinformatics — Neuromodulation — Neurophotonics — Neuroprosthetics — Neuroprotection — Neurorehabilitation — Neuroscience — Neurostimulator — Neurotechnology — Nuclear magnetic resonance spectroscopy — Nuclear medicine

== O ==
Ocular prosthetics — Oncolytic virus — Optical imaging — Optical spectroscopy — Optogenetics — Oral mucosa tissue engineering — Organ culture — Organ printing — Orthopedic Surgery — Orthosis — Osteology — Oxygen therapy

== P ==
Pacemaker — Pain management — Personal health record — Personalized medicine — Pharmacology — Physiologically based pharmacokinetic modelling — Point of care testing — Positron emission tomography — Precision medicine — Preventive healthcare — Prosthesis — Protein engineering — Polysomnograph

== Q ==
Quantitative genetics — Quantitative proteomics — Quantum dots

== R ==
Radiological imaging — Radiation therapy — Radiology — Radiomics — Regenerative medicine — Reliability engineering — Remote physiological monitoring — Replacement joint — Reproductive technology — Retinal implant — RNA interference — RNA splicing — Robot-assisted surgery

== S ==
Safety engineering — Sleep medicine — Soft tissue — Spatial transcriptomics — Speech-language pathology — Structural biology — Stem cell — Stem-cell therapy — Strategies for engineered negligible senescence — Synthetic biology — Synthetic genomics — Systems medicine

== T ==
Telemedicine — Tissue culture — Tissue engineering — Translational medicine — Tricorder

== U ==
Uterine transplant — Ultrasound — Ultrasonography

== V ==
Viability assay — Virotherapy

== W ==
Wearable technology — Whole genome sequencing — Wound healing

== X ==
X-ray — X-ray microscope

== Y ==
Young's Modulus

== Z ==
Zoonosis
