= Aortoiliac occlusive disease =

- Other names: Leriche's syndrome and Leriche syndrome
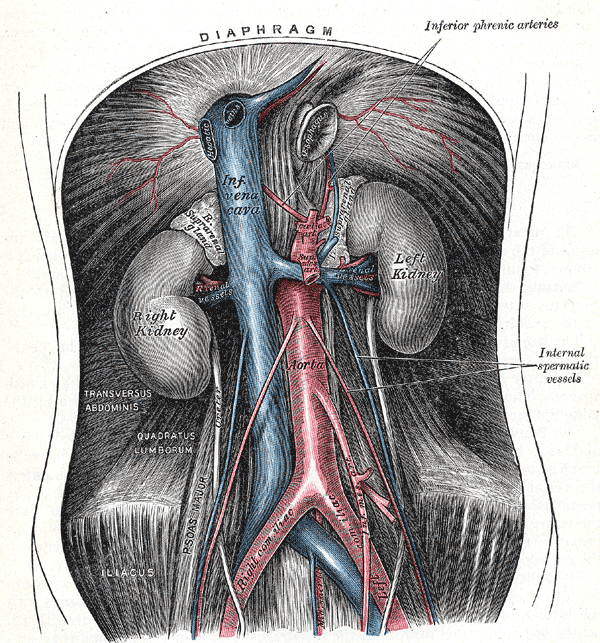
- Plate from Gray's Anatomy showing the abdominal aorta and the common iliac arteries
- Specialty: Cardiology

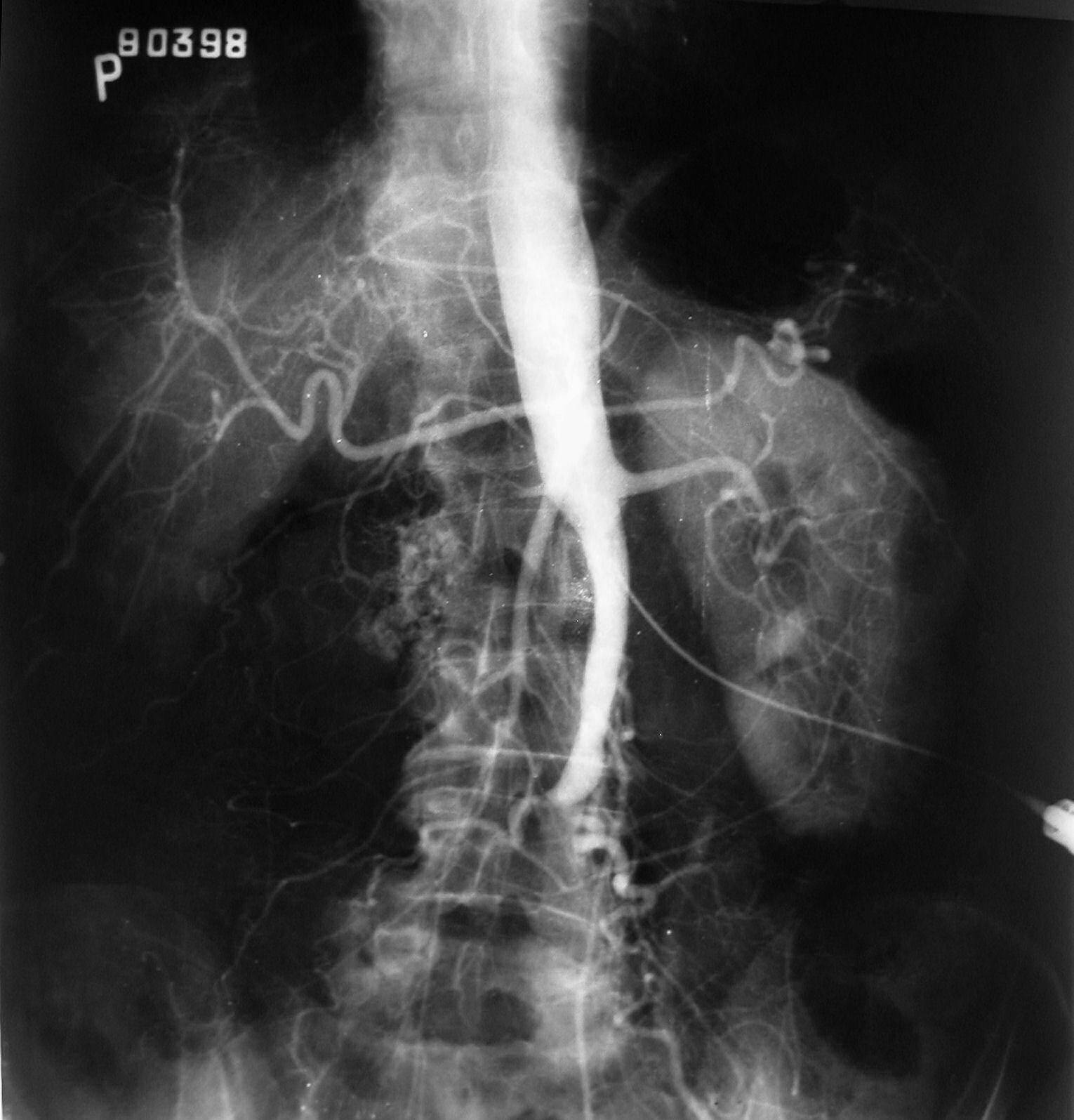
Fluoroscopic image of an aorta affected by Leriche's syndrome

In medicine, aortoiliac occlusive disease, also known as Leriche syndrome, is a form of central artery disease involving the blockage of the abdominal aorta as it transitions into the common iliac arteries.

== Signs and symptoms ==
Classically, it is described in male patients as a triad of the following signs and symptoms:

1. claudication of the buttocks and thighs
2. absent or decreased femoral pulses
3. erectile dysfunction

== Diagnosis ==
The physical examination usually shows weakened femoral pulses and a reduced ankle-brachial index. The diagnosis can be verified by color duplex scanning, which reveals either a peak systolic velocity ratio ≥2.5 at the site of stenosis and/or a monophasic waveform. MRA and multidetector CTA are often used to determine the extent and type of obstruction. Another technique is digital subtraction angiography which allows verification of the diagnosis and endovascular treatment in a single session.
Angiography provides important information regarding the perfusion and patency of distal arteries (e.g. femoral artery). The presence of collateral arteries in the pelvic and groin area is important in maintaining crucial blood flow and lower limb viability. However, angiography should only be used if symptoms warrant surgical intervention.

== Treatment ==
Treatment involves revascularization typically using either angioplasty or a type of vascular bypass

- Kissing balloon angioplasty +/- stent, so named because the two common iliac stents touch each other in the distal aorta.
- Aorto-iliac bypass graft
- Axillary-bi-femoral and femoral-femoral bypass (sometimes abbreviated "ax-fem fem-fem")

== History ==
The condition was first described by Robert Graham in 1813, but the condition with its triad of symptoms was ascribed to René Leriche. Leriche, a French surgeon, linked the pathophysiology with the anatomy of the condition. John Hunter's dissections of atherosclerotic aortic bifurcations from the late 18th century are preserved at the Hunterian Museum in London, but Leriche was first to publish on the subject based on a patient he treated with the condition at the age of 30. Following treatment the 30-year-old was able to walk without pain and maintain an erection.

== See also ==
- Claudication
- Peripheral arterial disease
