= René Leriche =

French vascular surgeon and physiologist

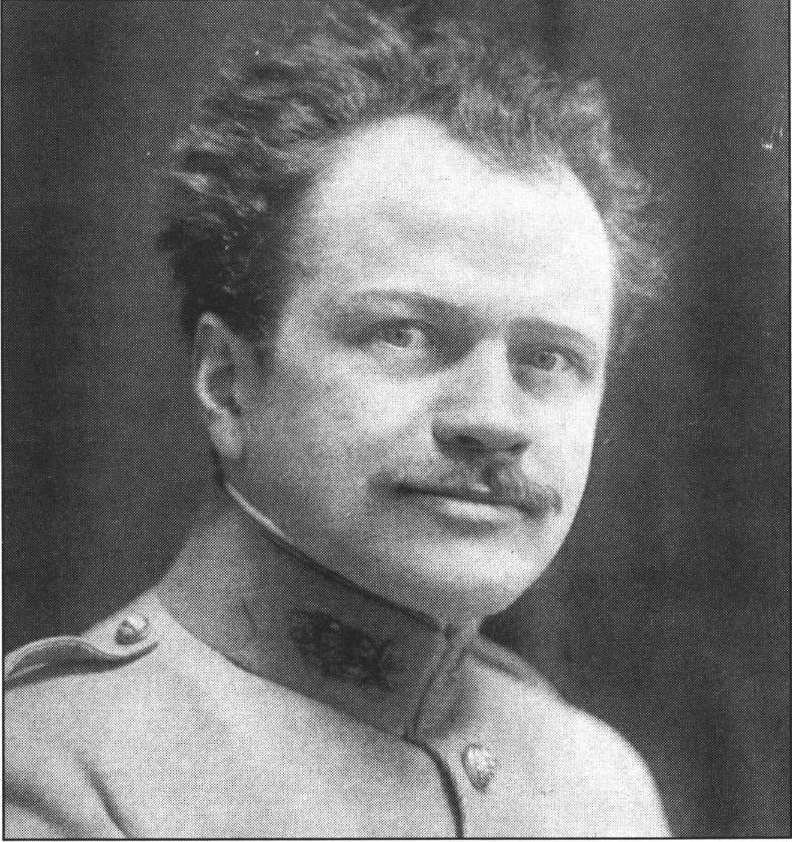
- René Leriche
- Born: Henri Marie René Leriche; 12 October 1879; Roanne, Loire
- Died: 28 December 1955 (aged 76); Cassis
- Awards: Lister Medal (1939)
- Scientific career
- Fields: surgeon

Henri Marie René Leriche (12 October 1879 – 28 December 1955) was a French vascular surgeon and physiologist.

He was a specialist in pain, vascular surgery and the sympathetic trunk. He sensitized many who were mutilated in the first World war, he was the first to be interested in pain and to practice gentle surgery with as little trauma as possible.

Two syndromes are named after him - Algoneurodystrophy and the Aortoiliac occlusive disease. He has trained many students, such as Michael E. DeBakey, João Cid dos Santos, René Fontaine et Jean Kunlino.

== Biography - Early life ==
Born in 1879 in the city of Roanne, central France, to a family of Lyonian doctors, his father Ernest Leriche was an avoué and his mother Anne Chamussy, married to Leriche, belong to the elite industrial region. Rene Leriche was the third child of seven siblings. He is the brother of Marc Leriche, a French sculptor. He attended the school of Maristes.

In 1893, he obtained a bachelor's degree in rhetoric (ref needed). He then poses a question of following the footsteps of his grandfather, his great-uncle and his uncle in the path of surgery, École Militaire de Saint-Cyr to take on a military career. In March 1894, he changed his mind and wrote to his parents that he wanted to become a surgeon. He completed his bachelor of philosophy to enter the Faculty of Sciences of Lyon in November, and prepared the PCN (Physics, Chemistry, Natural Sciences).

In 1899–1900, Leriche did his military service in the 98th Infantry Regiment. He was an intern in 1902, then a doctor of medicine by supporting a thesis on the technique of surgical resection in the treatment of stomach cancer in 1906, under the direction of Antonin Poncet. In Lyon, he became friends with Alexis Carrel, whom he later meet in New York.

René Leriche married Louise Héliot Calenborn on 27 September 1910 in Lyon. His wife comes from an old Germanic Catholic Family . A doctor herself, she will be his closest collaborator.

Upon receiving his diploma from Lyons in 1906, he was appointed head of surgical clinic until 1909.

== First World War ==
At the beginning of the war, he was assigned in a surgical ambulance automobile in the Vosges. After a short visit to Creil in a triage and regulation hospital, he was appointed to the Panthéon hospital. Then he went to the Russian hospital in the Carlton Hotel. In April 1917, after wishing to return to the front, René Leriche joined Robert Proust and his team of Auto-chir (ACA n o 17). Leriche was asked by the Lyon histologist and radiobiologist Claudius Regaud to enter the training he was preparing for to serve as a "School of Medicine and War Surgery" in HOE 4 de Bouleuse, near Reims. Regaud's training became so renowned, it was that his method would be used to admit the newly-arrived Americans into active formation. René Leriche found several great names in medicine: the brilliant specialist in thoracic surgery Jean-Louis Roux-Berger (well ahead of what was done elsewhere), Lemaître, who will remain the creator of the primitive suture of the wounds, the neurologist Georges Guillain, Lyon radiologist Thomas Nogier and pathologist Pierre Masson. However, he had the support for assistant Paul Santy and convert for his department of fractures and joint lesions.

A young doctor, freshly arrived, hastened to meet him: Georges Duhamel. With the help of Paul Santy, Leriche undertook very extensive research work on osteogenesis and was particularly interested in repairing fractures with experiments carried out on rabbits, and he was already pursuing scholarly reflections on the role of vasa motricity in the site of trauma. That required many cuts histological and as many X-rays or photographs, but the environment and the organization of the very large 3,000-bed field hospital permitted it. He became chief surgeon on 28 December 1917.

During the war, Leriche's idea was to differentiate the traditional white linen in which the wounded were brought from the laundry of the aseptic surgical operating rooms. He chose blue and had the surgical rooms painted blue. All the linen of the operating rooms is also blue: operating linen, casaques, caps, masks. The colour would be adopted worldwide, and the convention will make it possible to minimise infectious contamination.

== Interwar period ==
He became a surgeon of the hospitals in Lyon in 1919. A stay in the United States allowed for him to meet Simon Flexner (who advocates "smooth" surgery) at the Rockefeller Foundation and then William Halsted in Baltimore but a number of surgeons also had an influence on him. In 1924, he was the holder of the chair at The University of Strasbourg, who responded to the call of the dean Georges Weiss after the death of Louis Sencert. He introduced the important notion of non aggressive surgery. In 1925, during his inaugural lecture at the chair of surgical clinic of the University of Strasbourg. He said that surgery should no longer be limited to the correction or removal of anatomical lesions but should address the treatment of functional disorders.

He cured and amputated Marshal Joffre at the end of his life.

In 1936 he succeeded Charles Nicolle at the Collège de France in Paris, where he occupied the chair of Experimental Medicine from 1937 to 1950. This enabled him to continue his research by creating a laboratory for experimental surgery and conceptualizing his theories on Physiology and pathology. In the wake of Claude Bernard, Leriche states that "the disease appears above all as a functional perversion.

== Second World War ==
Back in Lyon after the armistice of 22 June 1940, he declined the post of health minister who was offered by the French head of state, Philippe Pétain. He, however, accepted the presidency of the National Order of Physicians, created in October 1940 by the Vichy règime, which strengthened the state's hold over the organization of medicine, supported the numerus clausus in medical studies and applied an important role in the exclusion of Jewish doctors by participating in their denunciation and especially the process of despoiling "vacant" practices.

Several years after the war, he would say that he left because he disagreed with the directive of the state. On 23 January 1941, Leriche was made a member of the National Council of Vichy France. He was also decorated with the Order of the Francisque. He justified his attitude by stating, like other defenders, that the régime served as a shield against the occupiers. Like many people engaged in the collaboration with Vichy, he would be hardly troubled and minimised his involvement.

== Post-War ==
At the Liberation of France, he was expelled from the official circuits because of his role on the National Council of Vichy. However, he was elected a member of the Academy of Sciences and of the National Academy of Medicine in 1945.

He corrected the proofs of his autobiography shortly before his death in 1955. The book was published in 1956, under the title, chosen by the publisher, Souvenirs de ma vie morte.

== Works and publications ==
- Thesis of medicine under the direction of Antonin Poncet, Resections of the stomach for cancer: technique, results, immediate, remote results, Lyon, 1906
- Titles and scientific work, Lyon, Imprimeries réunies, 1907 (read online [Archive])
- About the surgical treatment of the pericardial symphysis and mediastino-pericarditis, Bulletin de la Surgical Society of Lyon, Paris, Masson, January 1911 (read online [Archive])
- Pure asepsis and physical
- l means in the treatment of war wounds at their various stages. Chemotherapy or Physiotherapy, Bulletin of the Surgical Society of Lyon, Paris, Masson (read online [archive]), January–February 1916
- (En) With the assistance of the consultant surgeon of the British forces in France, The treatment of fractures, vol. 1, University of London Press (read online [archive])
- (En) With the assistance of the consultant surgeon of the British forces in France, The treatment of fractures, vol. 2, University of London Press (read online [archive])
- (En) Some researches on the peri-arterial sympathetics, Annals of Surgery, October 1921 (read online [Archive])
- Surgery of the sympathetic system. Indications and results, Annals of Surgery, September 1928 (read online [Archive])
- (En) The problem of osteo-articular diseases of vasomotor origin. Hydrarthrosis and Traumatic Arthritis: Genesis and Treatment, Journal of Bone and Joint Surgery, 1928 (read online [Archive])
- La chirurgie de la douleur (1938) Later translated to Pain surgery, Paris, Masson & Cie, 1940
- (En) The Listerian Idea in 1939, British Medical Journal, 1939 (read online [Archive])
- Surgery at the Order of Life, Paris / Aix-les-Bains, O. Zeluck, 1944
- Surgery, Discipline of Knowledge, Nice, La Diane Française, 1949
- Arterial aneurysms and arteriovenous fistulas, Paris, Masson & Cie, 1949
- The philosophy of surgery, Paris, Flammarion, Bibliothèque de philosophie scientifique, 1951
- Memories of My Dead Life, Editions du Seuil, 1956 (ISBN 2020020785)

== In collaboration ==
- Report presented by Antonin Poncet and René Leriche, Pathogenesis of spontaneous ankyloses and particularly vertebral ankyloses, French Association for the Advancement of Science, Lyon Congress, 2–7 August 1906
- ( In ) with André Morel, The Syndrome of Thrombotic Obliteration of the Aortic Bifurcation, Annals of Surgery, February 1948

== Eponymy ==
- Leriche operation: sympathetic denervation (or sympathectomy) by arterial decortication for the treatment of arteritis of the lower limbs.
- Leriche syndrome: thrombotic obliteration of the aortic bifurcation
- Sudeck-Leriche syndrome or complex regional pain syndrome (or algoneurodystrophy).
- Classification of Leriche and Fontaine: degree in four stages of arteritis obliterans of the lower limbs
- The plane of Leriche: The surgical plane between a blood vessel adventitia and the loose areolar tissue surrounding it

== Citations ==
- "Health is life in the silence of the organs. " (1936 18 )
- "In disease, what is less important at bottom is man. " (French Encyclopedia, 1936)
- "Pain does not protect man. It diminishes it. " (Surgery and Pain, 1940)
- "The study of pain leads to human medicine in all its gestures. " (1944)
- "The fight against pain is wear and tear ... To consent to suffering is a sort of slow suicide ... And there is only one pain that is easy to bear, it is that of others. "

== Titles ==
- Doctor of Medicine (1906)
- Surgeon of the Hospitals (1919)
- Professor at the Collège de France (1936)

== Decorations ==
- Order of the Francisque
- Grand Officer of the Legion of Honor
- Croix de guerre 1914–1918
- Interallied Medal 1914–1918
- Commemorative War Medal 1914–1918

== Other honors ==
- Honorary fellow of the Royal College of Physicians (1927)
- International Medicine of Surgery (1931)
- Lister Medal (in) 19 (1939)
- Member of the Academy of Sciences (1945)
- Member of the National Academy of Medicine (1945)

== Tribute ==
- A lane and a pavilion of the civil hospital of Strasbourg bear its name.
- Postal stamp, designed by André Spitz, engraved by René Cottet, issued by France on 27 January 1958.

== Bibliography ==
- Losardo RJ et al. Alfonso Roque Albanese: Latin American Pioneer of Heart Surgery. Tribute from the Pan American Association of Anatomy. Int. J. Morphol.. 2017;35(3):1016-1025. ISSN 0717-9502
