= Elaine P. Scott =

American engineer

Elaine Patricia Scott (born 1957) is an American mechanical engineer and academic administrator, the former dean of the Santa Clara University School of Engineering and John M. Sobrato Endowed Professor at Santa Clara University. Her research has concerned heat transfer and the design of experiments.

== Education and career ==
Scott's father taught industrial arts (shop) at a high school; her mother was a social worker. She studied agricultural engineering at the University of California, Davis, earning a bachelor's degree in 1979 and a master's degree in 1981. She completed a Ph.D. in agricultural engineering at Michigan State University in 1987, before switching to mechanical engineering and earning a second Ph.D. at Michigan State in 1990.

She continued at Michigan State as an assistant professor, jointly appointed in mechanical and agricultural engineering, before moving in 1992 to Virginia Tech as an assistant professor of mechanical engineering. She was promoted to associate professor in 1995 and (after two years on leave as an associate professor at the University of Utah) to full professor in 2000.

Shifting to academic administration, in 2001 she became founding director of the Virginia Tech - Wake Forest University School of Biomedical Engineering & Sciences. In 2006 she moved to the University of Washington Bothell as founding dean of the School of Science, Technology, Engineering and Mathematics. And in 2019 she moved again to Santa Clara University, as dean of engineering.

== Recognition ==
Scott was named as an ASME Fellow in 2007.
