= Vascular bypass =

Type of surgical grafting

- Other names: Vascular graft
- Specialty: Vascular surgery, cardiac surgery

A vascular bypass is a surgical procedure performed to redirect blood flow from one area to another by reconnecting blood vessels. Often, this is done to bypass around a diseased artery, from an area of normal blood flow to another relatively normal area. It is commonly performed due to inadequate blood flow (ischemia) caused by atherosclerosis, as a part of organ transplantation, or for vascular access in hemodialysis. In general, someone's own vein (autograft) is the preferred graft material (or conduit) for a vascular bypass, but other types of grafts such as polytetrafluoroethylene (Teflon), polyethylene terephthalate (Dacron), or a different person's vein (allograft) are also commonly used. Arteries can also serve as vascular grafts. A surgeon sews the graft to the source and target vessels by hand using surgical suture, creating a surgical anastomosis.

Common bypass sites include the heart (coronary artery bypass surgery) to treat coronary artery disease, and the legs, where lower extremity bypass surgery is used to treat peripheral vascular disease.

== Medical uses ==
=== Cardiac bypass ===
Cardiac bypass is performed when the arteries that bring blood to the heart muscle (coronary arteries) become clogged by plaque. Such a condition may cause chest pain from angina pectoris or a heart attack. Dimensional aspects, material selection, and manufacturing methods influence mechanistic behaviours of artificial grafts and chosen to receive artery-like behaviour

=== Leg (lower extremity) bypass ===
In the legs, bypass grafting is used to treat peripheral vascular disease, acute limb ischemia, aneurysms and trauma. While there are many anatomical arrangements for vascular bypass grafts in the lower extremities depending on the location of the disease, the principle is the same: to restore blood flow to an area without normal flow.

For example, a femoral-popliteal bypass ("fem-pop") might be used if the femoral artery is occluded. A fem-pop bypass may refer to the above- or below-knee popliteal artery. Other anatomic descriptions of lower extremity bypasses include:

- "fem-fem" - femoral to femoral bypass, e.g. from right to left. Used when there is no inflow to one femoral artery (i.e., the iliac artery on the receiving side is diseased) but there is aortic flow.
- "aorto-bifem" - aortic to both femoral arteries. Used when there is disease at the aortic bifurcation, known as Leriche syndrome, or in both iliac arteries.
- "ax-bifem" - axillary artery to both femoral artery bypass. Either axillary artery can be used as the origin of the bypass. Used when patient cannot tolerate a more invasive and higher risk aorto-bifem, or when removing an infected aortic graft such as an EVAR device.
- "fem-tib" - femoral to one of the three tibial arteries (Anterior, Posterior or Peroneal). Used for disease of the femoral and tibial arteries, this procedure is used most frequently in people with diabetes, which tends to create disease in the tibial arteries rather than the more proximal arteries.
- a "DP" bypass - any vascular bypass where the target is the dorsalis pedis artery on the dorsum of the foot. It is used in similar situations to those described for the fem-tib bypass.

=== Hemodialysis access ===
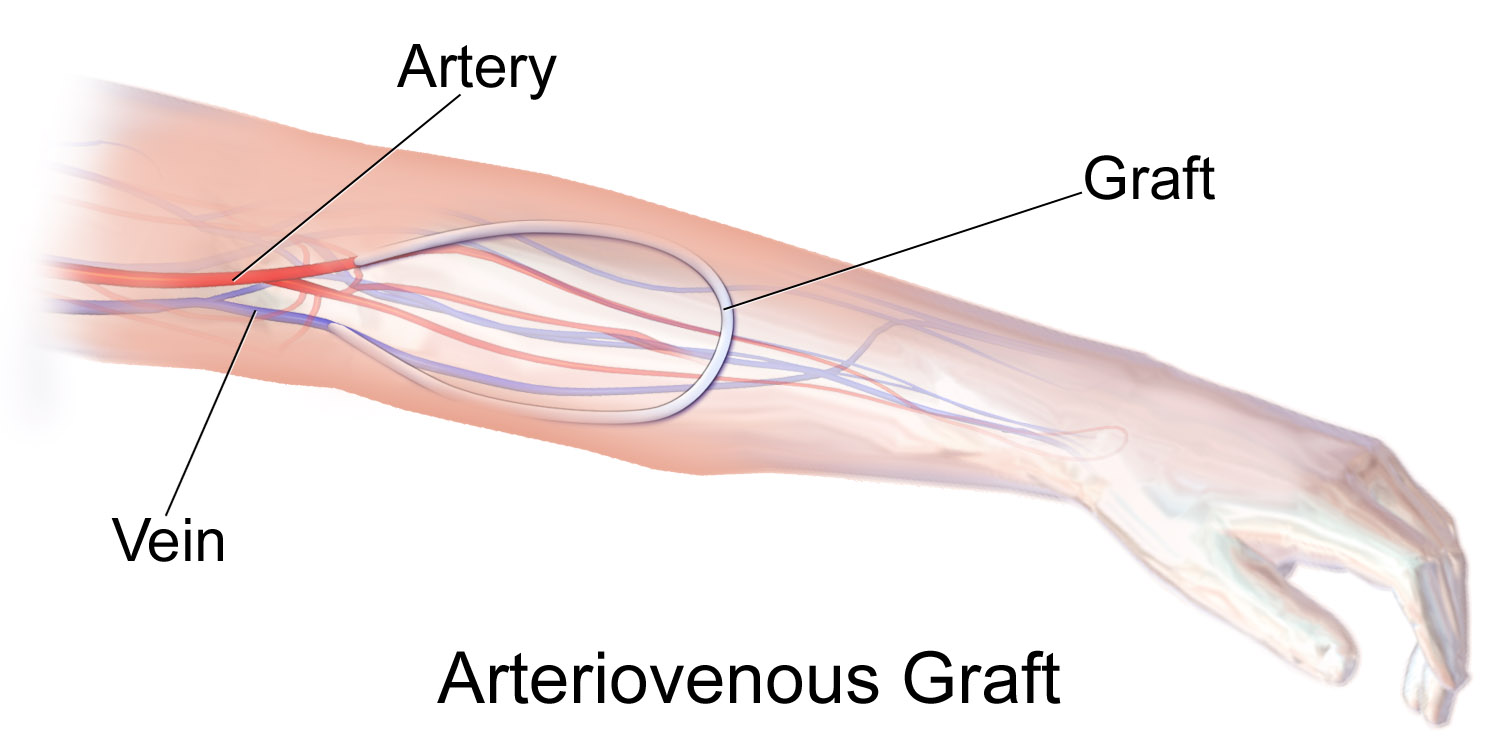
An arteriovenous graft serving as a fistula for hemodialysis access

A vascular bypass is often created to serve as an access point to the circulatory system for hemodialysis. Such a bypass is referred to as an arteriovenous fistula if it directly connects a vein to an artery without using synthetic material.

=== Cerebral artery bypass ===
In the skull, when blood flow is blocked or a damaged cerebral artery prevents adequate blood flow to the brain, a cerebral artery bypass may be performed to improve or restore flow to an oxygen-deprived (ischemic) area of the brain.

There are two main types of cerebral artery bypass: direct and indirect. Direct revascularization is also known as EC-IC bypass because it involves directly connecting an extracranial artery outside the brain to an intracranial artery inside the brain. This is also sometimes called STA-MCA bypass because the superficial temporal artery and the middle cerebral artery are the most commonly used arteries for the surgery. STA-MCA bypass surgery has been shown to be ineffective in reducing the risk of ischemic stroke in an international, randomized clinical trial. Indirect revascularization involves placing part of an artery, in the case of EDAS (encephaloduroarteriosynangiosis), or part of a muscle, in the case of EMS (encephalomyosynangiosis), on the surface of the brain and allowing it to revascularize the brain through new vessel growth. Both types of indirect revascularization typically take 3-6 months to see effects.

When several arteries are blocked and several bypasses are needed, the procedure is called multiple bypass. The number of bypasses needed does not always increase the risk of surgery, which depend more on the patient's overall health.

== Evaluation ==
Prior to constructing a bypass, most surgeons will obtain or perform an imaging study to determine the severity and location of the diseased blood vessels. For cardiac and lower extremity disease, this is usually in the form of an angiogram. For hemodialysis access, this can be done with ultrasound. Occasionally, a CT angiogram will take the place of a formal angiogram.

== Contraindications ==
The lack of an adequate venous conduit is a relative contraindication to bypass surgery, and depending on the area of disease, alternatives may be used. Medical conditions such as ischemic heart disease or chronic obstructive pulmonary disease that increase the risk of surgery are also relative contraindications. For coronary and peripheral vascular disease, lack of "runoff" to the distal area is also a contraindication because a vascular bypass around one diseased artery to another diseased area does not solve the vascular problem.

If a patient is deemed to be too high-risk to undergo a bypass, he or she may be a candidate for angioplasty or stenting of the relevant vessel.

== Techniques ==
=== Standard techniques ===
Dogma in vascular bypass technique says to obtain proximal and distal control. This means that in a vessel with flow through it, a surgeon must have exposure of the furthest and nearest extents of the blood vessel in which the bypass is being created, so that when the vessel is opened, blood loss is minimized. After the necessary exposure, clamps are usually used on both the proximal and distal end of the segment. Exceptions exist where there is no blood flow through the target vessel at the area of proposed entry, as is the case with an intervening occlusion.

If the organ perfused by an artery is sensitive to even temporary occlusion of blood flow, such as in the brain, various other measures are taken.

=== ELANA ===
In neurosurgery, excimer laser assisted non-occlusive anastomosis (ELANA) is a technique used to create a bypass without interrupting the blood supply in the recipient blood vessels. This reduces the risk of stroke or a rupture of an aneurysm.

== Risks and complications ==
Several complications can arise after vascular bypass.

Risks of the bypass:

- Acute graft occlusion is the occlusion (blockage) of a vascular bypass graft shortly after the bypass is performed. Its causes, which are distinct from those of chronic graft occlusion, include technical failure (e.g. anastomotic stricture, incomplete valve lysis in non-reversed vein) and thrombosis. It is rare, but almost always requires reoperation.

General risks of surgery:

- Hemorrhage (bleeding)
- Infection
- Embolism

== Recovery ==
Immediately following coronary artery or neurosurgical vascular bypass surgery, patients recover in an intensive care unit or coronary care unit for one to two days. Provided that recovery is normal and without complications, they can move to a less intensively monitored unit such as a step-down unit or a ward bed. Depending on the extent of the surgery, recovery from a leg bypass may start from a step-down or ward bed. Monitoring immediately after bypass surgery focuses on signs and symptoms of bleeding and graft occlusion. If bleeding is detected, treatment can range from transfusion to reoperation. Later on in the hospital course, common complications include wound infections, pneumonia, urinary tract infection, and graft occlusion.

At discharge, patients are often prescribed oral painkillers, and should be prescribed a statin and an anti-platelet medication if not contraindicated and their bypass was performed for atherosclerosis, (e.g., peripheral vascular disease or coronary artery disease). Some patients start feeling normal after one month, while others may still experience problems several months after the procedure.

During the first twelve weeks after most bypass operations, patients are advised to avoid heavy lifting, house work, and strenuous recreation like golf, tennis, or swimming while their surgical wounds heal, particularly the sternum after coronary bypass.

Part of the recovery after any bypass surgery includes regular visits to a physician to monitor the patient's recovery. Normally a follow-up visit with a surgeon is scheduled for two to four weeks after surgery. The frequency of these visits gradually lessens as the patient's health improves.

For vascular bypass operations performed for atherosclerosis, the operation does not cure the metabolic problem that led to the vascular disease. Lifestyle changes that include quitting smoking, making diet changes, and getting regular exercise are required to cure the underlying condition.
