= Ervin Sejdic =

Medical researcher

- Born: 1979 (age 46–47); Gradačac, Bosnia and Herzegovina
- Education: University of Western Ontario
- Awards: Presidential Early Career Award for Scientists and Engineers (2013), National Science Foundation CAREER Awards (2017)
- Scientific career
- Fields: Biomedical engineering, Electrical engineering, Data science, Medicine
- Workplaces: North York General Hospital
- Doctoral advisor: Professor Jin Jiang
- Website: www.nygh.on.ca

Ervin Sejdic is North York General Hospital's Research Chair in Artificial Intelligence for Health Outcomes. He focuses on biomedical signal processing, gait analysis, swallowing difficulties, advanced information systems in medicine, rehabilitation engineering, assistive technologies and anticipatory medical devices. He was previously a researcher at the Swanson School of Engineering, University of Pittsburgh, where he directs a research laboratory focused on engineering developments in medicine. His research has focused on creating computational biomarkers indicative of age- and disease-related changes in functional outcomes such as swallowing, gait and handwriting. In particular, he aims to develop clinically relevant solutions by fostering innovation in mechatronic systems (computational data-centric approaches and instrumentation) that can be translated to bedside care. Due to his contributions in signal processing and biomedical engineering, Sejdic has been named to editorial positions of IEEE Signal Processing Magazine, BioMedical Engineering Online and IEEE Transactions on Biomedical Engineering.

== Education ==
Sejdic has received his Bachelor of Engineering Science in electrical and computer engineering from the University of Western Ontario in 2002. He continued to a graduate program in electrical and computer engineering at the same university while being advised by Professor Jin Jiang, where Sejdic obtained his PhD in electrical and computer engineering in January 2008. Next, Sejdic joined Dr. Tom Chau's group at the University of Toronto and Holland Bloorview Kids Rehabilitation Hospital, where he was a postdoctoral fellow specializing in pediatric rehabilitation engineering and biomedical instrumentation. In 2011, Sejdic joined Harvard Medical School and Beth Israel Deaconess Medical Center as a research fellow in medicine, where he specialized in geriatrics (cardiovascular and cerebrovascular monitoring of older diabetic adults).

== Research ==
Sejdic's early research revolved around signal processing, specifically the area of time–frequency analysis. In more recent years, he has focused on modeling of human functions such as swallowing and gait. Sejdic has also made contributions in computational medicine, implantable medical devices, and biomedical engineering, including a novel brain-machine interface modality based on transcranial Doppler sonography.

== Awards ==
- 2018 University of Pittsburgh, Chancellor's Distinguished Research Award
- 2017 National Science Foundation CAREER Award
- 2013 Presidential Early Career Award for Scientists and Engineers
- 2010 Institute for Aging Research, Hebrew Senior Life, Melvin First Young Investigator's Award
- 2005 Natural Sciences and Engineering Research Council of Canada, Postgraduate Scholarship
- 2003 Natural Sciences and Engineering Research Council of Canada, Postgraduate Scholarship
