= External support =

Surgical implant

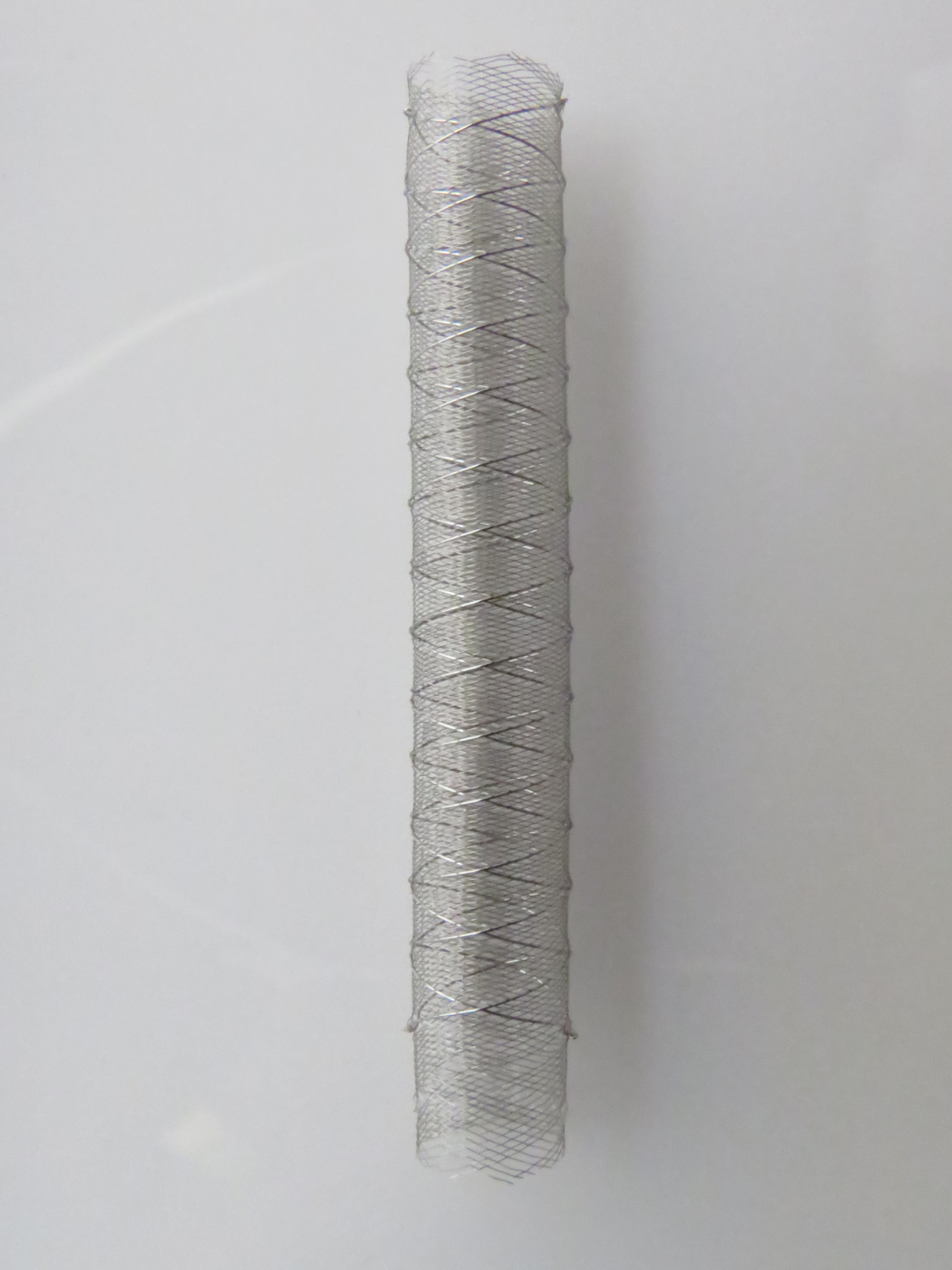
Venous external support made of cobalt chromium alloy mesh.

In cardiac surgery and vascular surgery, external support (or external stent) is a type of scaffold made of metal or plastic material that is inserted over the outside of the vein graft in order to decrease the intermediate and late vein graft failure after bypass surgery (e.g. CABG).

An external support (external stent) should be differentiated from a stent. An external support is placed on the outside of the vessel whereas a stent is inserted into the lumen of a vessel.

== Background ==
Veins are adapted to an environment of low pressure and low flow. In order to bypass the coronary obstruction and restore blood flow, veins are transferred and integrated into the arterial circulation, where they exposed to high pressure and flow. These new hemodynamic conditions cause intimal hyperplasia and atherosclerosis that cause intermediate and late vein graft failure. The idea of placing an external support on the vein graft was first suggested in 1963. The rational being that it will diminish the circumferential strain of the graft wall, therefore inhibiting intimal hyperplasia and later superimposed atherosclerosis, aiding with the adaptation of the vein toward the arterial environment.

== Method ==
The external scaffold provides a mechanical support for the vein graft, absorbs the high arterial pressure, constrict the vein graft dilatation, reduces lumen irregularities and mitigates intimal hyperplasia formation. As shown both in human tissue cultures and experimental models. However, until recently there were a limited number of clinical studies that showed less positive results. It was hypothesized that graft patency rates were lower with external support, because of aggressive over constriction of the vein graft, unsuitable material of the devices and the use of fibrin glue that has shown to cause tissue damage, fibrosis and intimal hyperplasia. Lately, more promising results with second generation devices showed that external support can mitigate intimal hyperplasia development, improve vein graft lumen uniformity and improve the flow pattern inside the graft. These benefits shown to remain for up to five years follow up. In addition to improving the vein graft failure rates in bypass surgeries, other research studies showed that external support might allow the use of conduits that previously have been considered to be unsuitable for surgery.

To date the technique is practiced in several cardiac centers in Europe, Israel and South Africa. Further clinical studies are ongoing in Europe and the US on a larger number of patients.
