= Terumo =

Japanese medical equipment manufacturer

Terumo Corporation
- Company type: Public (K.K)
- Traded as: TYO: 4543; Nikkei 225 Component
- Industry: Medical equipment
- Founded: September 17, 1921; 104 years ago
- Headquarters: 44-1, 2-chome, Hatagaya, Shibuya-ku, Tokyo 151-0072, Japan
- Key people: Toshiaki Takagi, (Chairman); Hikaru Samejima, (CEO)
- Products: Intravenous catheters; Infusion sets; Artificial heart and lungs; Blood glucose and blood pressure monitoring systems; Blood transfusion-related products; Oncology safety products; Peripheral stents; Oxygenators
- Revenue: ▲¥ 1,036.2 billion (FY 2024)
- Net income: ▲¥ 117.0 billion (FY 2024)
- Number of employees: 30,591 (consolidated) (as of March 31, 2024)
- Subsidiaries: Terumo Cardiovascular Systems, Corp. Vascutek Ltd. Microvention Inc.
- Website: Official website

Terumo Corporation (テルモ株式会社, Terumo Kabushiki-gaisha) was founded in 1921 as Red Line Thermometer Corporation by a group of medical scientists led by Dr. Kitasato Shibasaburō to produce medical thermometers in Japan.

The company's first product was "Jintan Taionkei", the first Japanese-made thermometer available for sale, and it has since expanded into a medical devices manufacturer, producing medical disposables, cardiovascular systems and diabetes care products.

In 1971, Terumo opened its first overseas office in the United States. Since then, the company has established subsidiaries in Europe (1971), South America, China, India, Philippines, Vietnam, Thailand, Australia and México. The company later expanded its product range to include coronary stents and catheters, and acquired, among others, the cardiovascular specialty companies Vascutek and Microvention in 2002 and 2006 respectively.

== Business segments and products ==
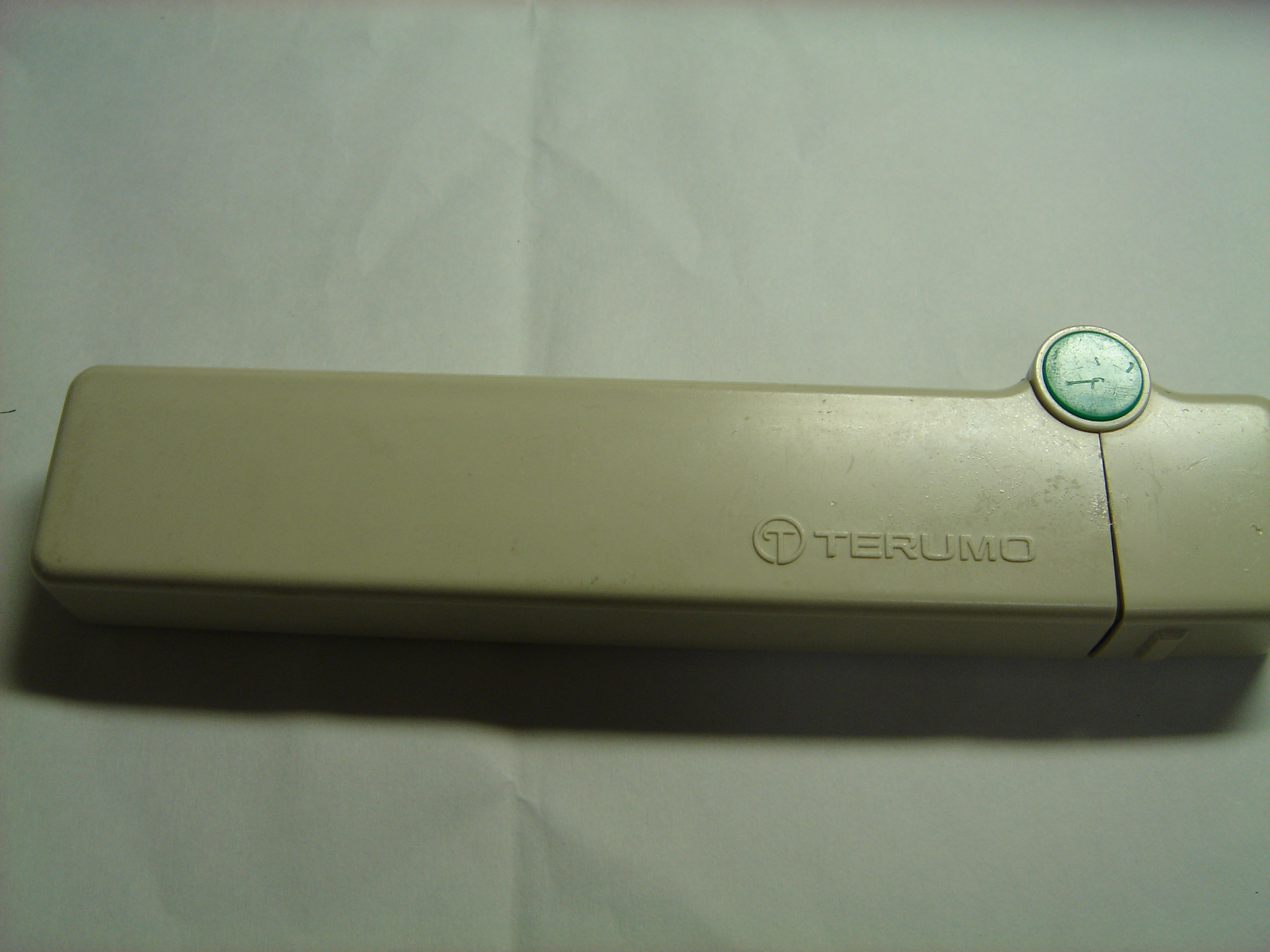
A Terumo thermometer

As of 2014 Terumo Corporation was organized into three business segments:

- Cardiac & Vascular Business
  - Intravascular ultrasound systems
  - Catheters for the treatment of coronary artery disease
  - Drug-eluting stents
  - Angiographic catheters
  - Abdominal and peripheral endovascular coils
  - Heart-lung machines
  - Oxygenators with integrated arterial filter
  - Artificial vascular grafts
- Blood Management Business
  - Automated blood collection system
  - Automated blood component processing devices
  - Blood bag systems with leukocyte reduction filter
  - Pathogen reduction technology systems
  - Therapeutic apheresis systems
  - Cell expansion systems
- General Hospital Business
  - IV catheters
  - Infusion sets
  - Syringe pumps
  - Blood glucose monitoring systems
  - Lancing devices for blood collection
  - CAPD systems
  - Digital thermometers
  - Blood pressure monitors

Terumo Penpol, the company's subsidiary in Trivandrum, India is the largest manufacturer of blood bags in India and supplies it to over 82 countries.

A medical device facility called Terumo BCT is located in Denver suburb of Lakewood, Colorado, and as of 2018, has been open and operating for over 20 years. A 2018 investigation into the release of ethylene oxide—a sterilizing agent for the blood diagnostic and treatment devices—into the atmosphere showed no increased cancer risk for those in the neighborhood, and the EPA will continue to allow up to 4,500 kg (10,000 lb) of ethylene oxide to be released annually. However, Terumo said they release only 1,100 kg (2,500 lb) per year and are working to reduce that amount.

== Acquisitions ==
In July 1999 Terumo acquired the cardiovascular division of 3M Company, and established Terumo Cardiovascular Systems Corp. in the USA.

In 1999, Terumo entered into a joint venture with the Kerala company Penpol.

In 2001 the company made two more acquisitions: it acquired the home oxygen division of Sumitomo Bakelite Co., Ltd., and establish Terumo Medical Care K.K., and Ikiken Co., Ltd. of Japan.

In 2002 the company acquired UK-based Vascutek.

Four years later, in 2006 the company ventured into a new field (endovascular coils for the treatment of cerebral aneurysms) by buying American company MicroVention Inc.

The tissue heart valve division of Kohler Chemine GmbH was acquired in March 2007 and expanded Terumo's operations related to vascular prostheses.

A year later the Japanese company Clinical Supply Co., Ltd. became a Terumo subsidiary and enhanced Terumo's interventional systems business in the field of radiotherapy.

In March 2011, the company bought U.S. medical device company CaridianBCT for around $2.6 billion. It was the largest acquisition by a Japanese medical equipment maker at the time.

The same year Harvest Technologies Corporation—point-of-care cell therapy—and Onset Medical Corp.—sheath technology designed for multiple, minimally-invasive clinical applications—was acquired.

In 2018, after the acquisition of Bolton Medical, a merger with Vascutek Ltd. gave place to the new company Terumo Aortic, focusing on “expanding aortic treatment options.”
