= Santa Clara University School of Engineering =

School of Engineering founded in 1912 at Santa Clara University

Coordinates: 37°21′4.08″N 121°56′22.87″W

- Motto: Ad Majorem Dei Gloriam (Latin)
- Motto in English: For the Greater Glory of God
- Type: Private
- Established: 1912
- Parent institution: Santa Clara University
- Affiliations: Santa Clara University
- Endowment: $603.6 million parent institution
- Dean: Elaine P. Scott
- Location: Santa Clara, California, United States
- Colors: Red and White
- Website: Official website

Santa Clara University School of Engineering was founded and began offering bachelor's degrees in 1912. Over the next century, as the Santa Clara Valley transformed from a largely agricultural area to an industrial center, the school added master and doctoral programs designed to meet the area's growing need for expert engineers. Today, the Silicon Valley provides a setting for the school's programs offered through a broad range of departments.

== Academics ==
The School of Engineering offers eight undergraduate majors, twelve Master's degrees, nine academic minors, three Doctor of Philosophy degrees, and fourteen graduate academic certificates. They offer a Bachelor of Science and Master of Science Five-Year B.S. and M.S. Degree program through which students may complete some units toward the master’s degree while still enrolled as undergraduates.

- Bachelor of Science (BS)

Degrees in Bioengineering, Civil Engineering, Computer Science and Engineering, Electrical and Computer Engineering, Electrical Engineering, General Engineering, Mechanical Engineering, Web Design and Engineering

- Master of Science (MS)

Degrees in Aerospace Engineering, Applied Mathematics, Artificial Intelligence, Bioengineering, Civil Engineering, Computer Science and Engineering, Electrical and Computer Engineering, Engineering Management and Leadership, Mechanical Engineering, Power Systems and Sustainable Energy, Robotics and Automation.

- Doctor of Philosophy (PhD)

Degrees in Computer Engineering, Electrical and Computer Engineering, Mechanical Engineering

The Dean of the School of Engineering is Elaine Scott as of August 2019.

== Departments and programs ==
- Aerospace Engineering Program
- Applied Mathematics
- Bioengineering
- Civil, Environmental and Sustainable Engineering
- Computer Science and Engineering
- Electrical and Computer Engineering
- Engineering Management and Leadership
- General Engineering
- Mechanical Engineering
- Power Systems and Sustainable Energy Program

== Student organizations ==
- American Institute of Aeronautics and Astronautics (AIAA)
- Association for Computing Machinery (ACM)
- Association for Computing Machinery - Women's Chapter (ACM-W)
- AI Collaborate
- American Society of Civil Engineers (ASCE)
- American Society of Mechanical Engineers (ASME)
- Associated General Contractors of America (AGC)
- Biomedical Engineering Society (BMES)
- Energy Club
- Engineers Without Borders (EWB)
- Engineering World Health (EWH)
- Institute of Electrical and Electronics Engineers (IEEE)
- Maker Club
- National Society of Black Engineers (NSBE)
- Pi Tau Sigma (Mechanical Engineering Honor Society)
- Santa Clara Theta Tau
- Society of Hispanic Professional Engineers (SHPE-SCU)
- Society of Women Engineers (SWE)
- Tau Beta Pi (Engineering Honor Society)
- Upsilon Pi Epsilon (Honor Society for CSE, WEB, CS, MIS, & AIS Majors)
- Women in STEM
