= Polyanhydride =

Polyanhydrides are a class of biodegradable polymers characterized by anhydride bonds that connect repeat units of the polymer backbone chain. Their main application is in the medical device and pharmaceutical industry. In vivo, polyanhydrides degrade into non-toxic diacid monomers that can be metabolized and eliminated from the body. Owing to their safe degradation products, polyanhydrides are considered to be biocompatible.

== Applications ==
The characteristic anhydride bonds in polyanhydrides are water-labile (the polymer chain breaks apart at the anhydride bond). This results in two carboxylic acid groups which are easily metabolized and biocompatible. Biodegradable polymers, such as polyanhydrides, are capable of releasing physically entrapped or encapsulated drugs by well-defined kinetics and are a growing area of medical research. Polyanhydrides have been investigated as an important material for the short-term release of drugs or bioactive agents. The rapid degradation and limited mechanical properties of polyanhydrides render them ideal as controlled drug delivery devices.

One example, Gliadel, is a device in clinical use for the treatment of brain cancer. This product is made of a polyanhydride wafer containing a chemotherapeutic agent. After removal of a cancerous brain tumor, the wafer is inserted into the brain releasing a chemotherapy agent at a controlled rate proportional to the degradation rate of the polymer. The localized treatment of chemotherapy protects the immune system from high levels of radiation.

Other applications of polyanhydrides include the use of unsaturated polyanhydrides in bone replacement, as well as polyanhydride copolymers as vehicles for vaccine delivery.

== Classes ==
The structure of a polyanhydride molecule with n repeating units.

There are three main classes of polyanhydrides: aliphatic, unsaturated, and aromatic. These classes are determined by examining their R groups (the chemistry of the molecule between the anhydride bonds).

Aliphatic polyanhydrides consist of R groups containing carbon atoms bonded in straight or branched chains. This class of polymers is characterized by a crystalline structure, melting temperature range of 50–90 °C, and solubility in chlorinated hydrocarbons. They degrade and are eliminated from the body within weeks of being introduced to the bodily environment.

Unsaturated polyanhydrides consist of organic R groups with one or more double bonds (or degrees of unsaturation). This class of polymers has a highly crystalline structure and is insoluble in common organic solvents.

Aromatic polyanhydrides consist of R groups containing a benzene (aromatic) ring. Properties of this class include a crystalline structure, insolubility in common organic solvents, and melting points greater than 100 °C. They are very hydrophobic and therefore degrade slowly when in the bodily environment. This slow degradation rate makes aromatic polyanhydrides less suitable for drug delivery when used as homopolymers, but they can be copolymerized with the aliphatic class to achieve the desired degradation rate.

== Synthesis and characterization ==
Polyanhydrides are synthesized using either melt condensation or solution polymerization. Depending on the synthesis method used, various characteristics of polyanhydrides can be altered to achieve the desired product. Characterization of polyanhydrides determines the structure, composition, molecular weight, and thermal properties of the molecule. These properties are determined by using various light-scattering and size-exclusion methods.

=== Polymerization ===
Polyanhydrides can be easily prepared by using available, low cost resources. The process can be varied to achieve desirable characteristics. Traditionally, polyanhydrides have been prepared by melt condensation polymerization, which results in high molecular weight polymers. Melt condensation polymerization involves reacting dicarboxylic acid monomers with excess acetic anhydride at a high temperature and under a vacuum to form the polymers. Catalysts may be used to achieve higher molecular weights and shorter reaction times. Generally, a one-step synthesis (method involving only one reaction) is used which does not require purification.

There are many other methods used to synthesize polyanhydrides. Some of the other methods include: microwave heating, high-throughput synthesis (synthesis of polymers in parallel), ring opening polymerization (removal of cyclic monomers), interfacial condensation (high temperature reaction of two monomers), dehydrative coupling agents (removing the water group from two carboxyl groups), and solution polymerization (reacting in a solution).

=== Chemical structure and composition analysis ===
The chemical structure and composition of polyanhydrides can be determined using nuclear magnetic resonance (NMR) spectroscopy. The positions of peaks in proton NMR spectroscopy are determined by the class of polanhydride (aromatic, aliphatic, or unsaturated), and so provide information regarding structural features of the polymer, including whether a copolymer has a random or block-like structure. Molecular weight and degradation rate can also determined by spectroscopically.

=== Molecular weight analysis ===
Aside from using NMR to determine a polyanhydride’s molecular weight, gel permeation chromatography (GPC), and viscosity measurements may also be used.

=== Thermal properties ===
Differential scanning calorimetry (DSC) is used to determine the thermal properties of polyanhydrides. Glass transition temperature, melting temperature, and heat of fusion can all be determined by DSC. Crystallinity of a polyanhydride can be determined using DSC, Small angle X-ray scattering (SAXS), Nuclear magnetic resonance (NMR), and X-ray diffraction.

== Degradation ==
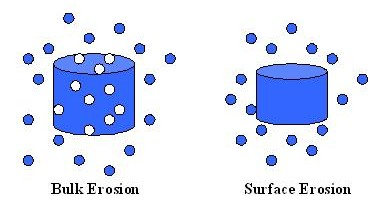
Comparison of bulk and surface erosion mechanisms.

The erosion and degradation of a polymer describe how the polymer physically loses mass (degrades). The two common erosion mechanisms are surface and bulk erosion. Polyanhydrides are surface eroding polymers. Surface eroding polymers do not allow water to penetrate into the material. They erode layer by layer, like a lollipop. The hydrophobic backbone with hydrolytically labile anhydride linkages allows hydrolytic degradation to be controlled by manipulating the polymer composition. This manipulation can occur by adding a hydrophilic group to the polyanhydride to make a copolymer. Polyanhydride copolymers with hydrophilic groups exhibit bulk eroding characteristics. Bulk eroding polymers take in water like a sponge (throughout the material) and erode inside and on the surface of the polymer.

Drug release from bulk eroding polymers is difficult to characterize because the primary mode of release from these polymers is diffusion. Unlike surface eroding polymers, bulk eroding polymers show a very weak relationship between the rate of polymer degradation and the rate of drug release. Therefore, the development of surface eroding polyanhydrides incorporated into the bulk eroding polymers is of increased importance.

== Biocompatibility ==
Biocompatibility and toxicity of a polymeric material is evaluated by examining systemic toxic responses, local tissue responses, carcinogenic and mutagenic responses, and allergic responses to the material's degradation products. Animal studies are conducted to test the polymer’s effect on each of these negative responses. Polyanhydrides and their degradation products have not been found to cause significant harmful responses and are considered to be biocompatible.
