= Terumo Penpol =

Terumo Penpol Private Limited
- Industry: Medical device
- Founded: 1983; 43 years ago (as Peninsula Polymers Limited)
- Founder: C. Balagopal
- Headquarters: Thiruvananthapuram, Kerala, India
- Key people: Kimura Yoshihiro (Chairperson); C. Balagopal (Senior advisor); C. Padmakumar (Executive director)
- Products: Blood bags; Medical electronic products
- Number of employees: 822
- Parent: Terumo Corporation
- Website: www.terumopenpol.com

Terumo Penpol Private Limited is a subsidiary of Terumo Corporation, and is India's largest blood bag manufacturer. It is also the largest producers of blood bags in Asia, outside Japan.

== History ==
Peninsula Polymers Limited (Penpol Ltd.) - was incorporated in 1983 by C. Balagopal, a former IAS (1977 Batch) officer from the Manipur Cadre. It was established as a joint venture with Sree Chitra Thirunal Institute of Medical Sciences and Technology (know fhen as the Chitra Medical Centre) and soon became the first company in India to produce blood bags using indigenous technology. In 1989, Penpol started exporting and followed it up by setting up an R&D centre.

In 1999, Tokyo-based Terumo Corporation signed a contract to acquire a 74% share of Peninsula Polymers Limited, and the new joint venture was renamed as Terumo Penpol Limited (TPL). The stake of financial institutions and other investors were bought over by Terumo, leaving only the promoters and itself as shareholders.

== Operations ==
Terumo Penpol has its headquarters in Thiruvananthapuram, Kerala and employs 1200 people. Terumo Penpol Blood Bags are sold in over 64 countries across the world and its medical equipment division has commissioned more than 25000 installations. TPL has entered its 25-year of operations in 2010, with an enhanced production capacity of 22 million blood bags per annum.

TPL has been winning the top exporter award or the second best exporter award for medical disposables every year from 1994 onwards.
