= BioMedical Engineering OnLine =

Academic journal

- Discipline: Biomedical engineering
- Language: English
- Edited by: Ervin Sejdic; Fong-Chin Su

Publication details
- History: 2002–present
- Publisher: BioMed Central
- Open access: Yes
- Impact factor: 2.819 (2021)

Standard abbreviations
- ISO 4: Biomed. Eng. Online

Indexing
- ISSN: 1475-925X
- OCLC no.: 916388118

Links
- Journal homepage; Online archive

BioMedical Engineering OnLine is a peer-reviewed online-only open access scientific journal covering biomedical engineering. It was established in 2002 and is published by BioMed Central. The editors-in-chief are Ervin Sejdic (University of Pittsburgh and Fong-Chin Su (National Cheng Kung University). According to the Journal Citation Reports, the journal has a 2018 impact factor of 2.013.
