= Vein graft failure =

Blockage of a grafted vein

In medicine, vein graft failure (VGF) is a condition in which vein grafts, which are used as alternative conduits in bypass surgeries (e.g. CABG), get occluded.

Veins, mainly the great saphenous vein (GSV) are the most frequently used conduits in bypass surgeries (CABG or PABG), due to their ease of use and availability. Some structural changes of intima thickening and vein wall remodeling are necessary for vein graft adaptation to the arterial environment. The reasons why some of the grafts progress to clinical stenosis is unknown. The patency rates of saphenous vein grafts after CABG at 1 year is approximately 80%. After 5 years the patency rate drops to 65% and at 10 years GSV patency rates are approximately 50%, with only half of the veins are atherosclerosis free. VGF may be identified in asymptomatic patients, but can also produce symptoms of ischemia, depending on the area of the supplied territory of the heart, and the function of native arteries and other grafts. VGF has been closely correlated with revascularization, myocardial infarction and death. Treatment of occluded GSVs can be performed by percutaneous coronary intervention or redo CABG and is considered to be challenging, and thus preventing their obstruction is of great importance.

== Mechanism ==
During and after the harvesting, veins go through a period of ischemia and reperfusion after engraftment, which causes damage to endothelial and smooth muscle cells (SMC). The grafting exposes the vein to arterial pressure and flow that causes increased shear stress and wall tension, which further damages the endothelial layer and SMC. The damage causes local release of tissue factors and reduced bioavailability of prostacyclin and nitric oxide (NO), all of which contribute to platelet activation, deposition of fibrin, which promotes thrombosis. Growth factors that released from macrophages and platelets lead to increased proliferation and migration of SMCs to the intima. The migrated SMC release extracellular matrix resulting in reduced intimal cellularity. Low levels of endothelial nitric oxide, adenosine and prostaglandins, further contribute to SMC proliferation. Over time continued SMC migration and proliferation cause extracellular matrix deposition and fibrotic change that lead to development of intimal hyperplasia, which results in luminal loss that makes the graft more susceptible to atherosclerosis. Progressive atherosclerosis is the primarily cause of late vein graft failure. Vein graft atherosclerotic lesions are more diffuse and concentric, yet less calcified, compared to native atherosclerotic lesions, and are more susceptible to thrombosis formation and rupture.

== Graft failure depending on saphenous vein harvesting technique ==
Having an intact outer fat pedicle is what differentiates the two main techniques for harvesting saphenous vein grafts. Conventionally, the outer fat pedicle is removed during the harvesting process. It has been proposed that the no-touch technique, leaving the outer fat pedicle intact, will cause less endothelial damage at the time of harvest. This lessens intimal hyperplasia in the long run.

== Prevention ==
Statins and antiplatelets such as aspirin, are the only medications recommended by the ESC guidelines and the ACC/AHA Task Force guidelines for the prevention of VGF. Different surgical techniques had been studied in attempt to reduce VGF. The No-touch technique is where the vein is harvested with the surrounding tissues, keeping the vasa vasorum and the nerves in the adventitia intact. This technique shown to improve vein graft patency and less development of intimal hyperplasia. Despite the benefits shown, the use of No-touch technique in CABG is limited to a few centers. Probably because of the shift toward improved cosmetic outcome and patient satisfaction provided by endoscopic vein harvesting (EVH). Although, EVH has been associated with higher risk of vein graft stenosis and occlusion. The solutions in which vein grafts are stored after harvesting also play an important role. Buffered saline, instead of saline or blood, has shown to reduce the risk of significant stenosis or occlusion. Providing the vein with external support prior to grafting has shown to reduce intimal hyperplasia formation and improve the hemodynamics within the graft. Gene therapy is another strategy that been suggested to prevent VGF as the veins are ideally suited for ex vivo treatment prior to grafting. Preclinical studies showed that such strategy has the potential to reduce intimal hyperplasia but more clinical data is needed.
