= Bioheat transfer =

Study of heat transfer in biological systems

Bioheat transfer is the study of heat transfer in biological systems. In simpler terms, it is the study of how heat moves from one compartment, be it within the body or external to the body, to another compartment in the body. Bioheat transfer has its foundations in the engineering discipline of heat transfer and is itself a subfield of biomedical engineering or bioengineering. In addition, computational techniques to model various bioheat transfer scenarios are widely employed and hold an important place in developing devices and protocols for the medical community.

== Applications ==
=== Ablative surgical procedures ===
Ablative surgical techniques generally employ some method of energy deposition which destroys cells and tissue with a concomitant increase in temperature at the targeted site. Bioheat transport equations can be applied to the process of energy deposition into the tissue as well as the subsequent conduction/convection heat transport to cells neighboring the targeted site to predict a temperature history and distribution.

== Bioheat models ==
In biological systems, models of heat transfer out of the body typically account for the effect of blood perfusion. A popular early model assumed that the tissue temperature was uniform below a certain depth, describing the heat transfer out of the body as proportional to the difference between the tissue temperature and the skin temperature. In 1948, Pennes published a new model backed by experimental analysis of the human forearm. He sought to model temperature gradients deep in the tissue. Finding that the temperature of blood in the brachial artery was warmer than that of surrounding tissue, he modeled the arterial blood flow as a heat source that dissipated its heat at the capillaries. Thus, the heat transfer due to blood perfusion was modeled as proportional to the temperature difference between arterial and venous blood.

Owing to its simplicity, Pennes's model is widely used in bioheat transfer analysis. However, the assumptions behind its perfusion term have been scrutinized. A 1974 model, the "Wulff Continuum Model", was created to fix several problems that Wulff saw with Pennes's model. Wulff noted that the blood perfusion term in Pennes equation is a "global" term that represents total heat transfer through the entire tissue, which is inconsistent with the fact that the rest of the equation represents net heat transfer at a given point. Later research has discovered that most heat transfer from blood flow occurs in the arterioles, before the blood reaches the capillaries, which has led to more complex models that take into account the geometry of blood vessels.

=== Pennes bioheat equation ===
Here we present a simplified model of the bioheat equation for steady-state, one-dimensional heat transfer. From a one-dimensional energy balance in the x-direction:

$\frac{d^2 T}{dx^2} + \frac{\dot{q}_m + \dot{q}_p}{k}=0 \quad [1]$

Where $\dot{q}_m$ is the metabolic heat source term and $\dot{q}_p$ is the perfusion heat source term, both per unit volume. The thermal conductivity, $k$, is a constant.

Pennes proposed an expression for the perfusion term by assuming that the temperatures of blood entering and exiting capillaries are both constant for any small volume of tissue. We can say that the temperatures of the blood at each state are the same as that of the surroundings, namely the arterial temperature and the local tissue temperature. Now we must define the perfusion rate, $\omega$. This is the ratio of the volumetric flow rate of blood per volume of tissue. Thus we have for the perfusion term:

$\dot{q}_p=\omega \rho_b c_b (T_a-T) \quad [2]$

Where $\rho_b$ and $c_b$ are the density and specific heat capacity of the blood, respectively.

Combining these two equations results in:

$\frac{d^2 T}{dx^2} + \frac{\dot{q}_m + \omega \rho_b c_b (T_a-T)}{k}=0 \quad [3]$

Which is the Pennes Bioheat Equation for one-dimensional, steady-state, heat transfer.

== See also ==
- Human body temperature
- Thermoregulation
