= Materialise Mimics =

Image processing software

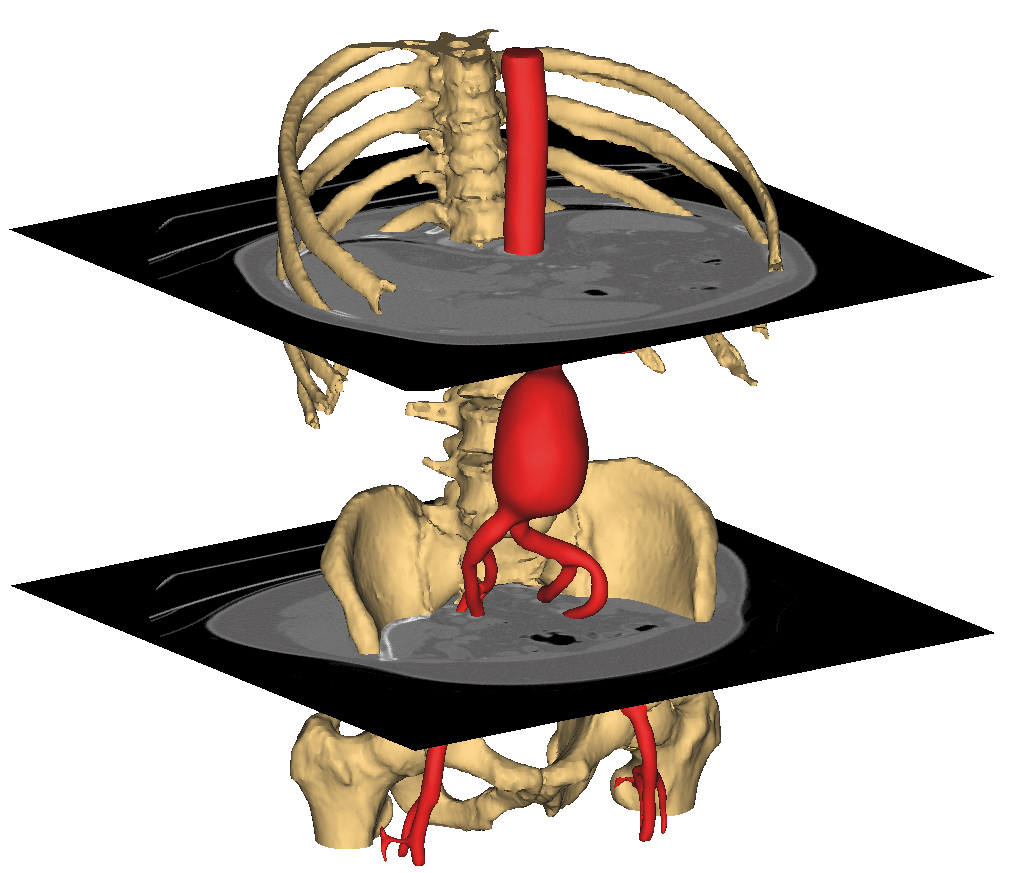
- 3D surface models created in Mimics from CT
- Developer(s): Materialise NV
- Stable release: 20.0 / June 2017
- Operating system: Windows
- Platform: 64bit
- Website: Mimics' Homepage

Materialise Mimics is an image processing software for 3D design and modeling, developed by Materialise NV, a Belgian company specialized in additive manufacturing software and technology for medical, dental and additive manufacturing industries. Materialise Mimics is used to create 3D surface models from stacks of 2D image data. These 3D models can then be used for a variety of engineering applications. Mimics is an acronym for Materialise Interactive Medical Image Control System. It is developed in an ISO environment with CE and FDA 510k premarket clearance. Materialise Mimics is commercially available as part of the Materialise Mimics Innovation Suite, which also contains Materialise 3-matic, a design and meshing software for anatomical data. The current version is 24.0(released in 2021), and it supports Windows 10, Windows 7, Vista and XP in x64.

== Process ==
Materialise Mimics calculates surface 3D models from stacked image data such as Computed Tomography (CT), Micro CT, Magnetic Resonance Imaging (MRI), Confocal Microscopy, X-ray and Ultrasound, through image segmentation. The ROI, selected in the segmentation process is converted to a 3D surface model using an adapted marching cubes algorithm that takes the partial volume effect into account, leading to very accurate 3D models. The 3D files are represented in the STL format.

== Uploading Data ==
DICOM data from CT or MRI images can be uploaded into Materialise Mimics in order to begin the segmentation process. From this data, 3 different views are present: the coronal, axial, and sagittal views. Another window is present to display 3D objects.

== Mask Creation ==
The "New Mask" tool can be used to highlight specific anatomy from the DICOM data.

== Printing Models ==
Models can be sent to 3D printers in the form of STLs.

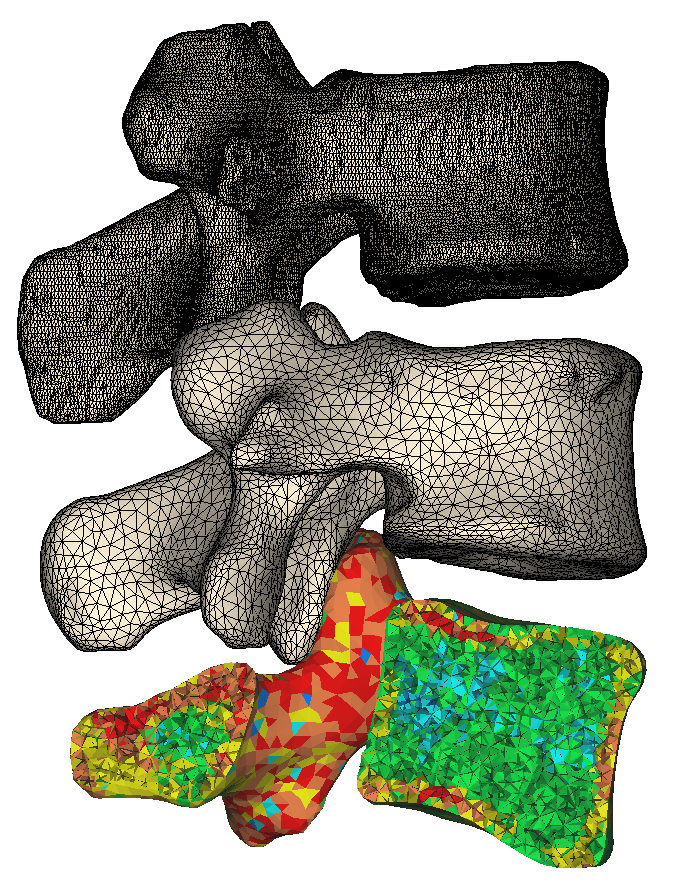
Spinal vertebrae displaying various mesh options. Top: normal high-density STL; Middle: surface mesh for FEA; Bottom: volume mesh including grayvalue-based material assignment

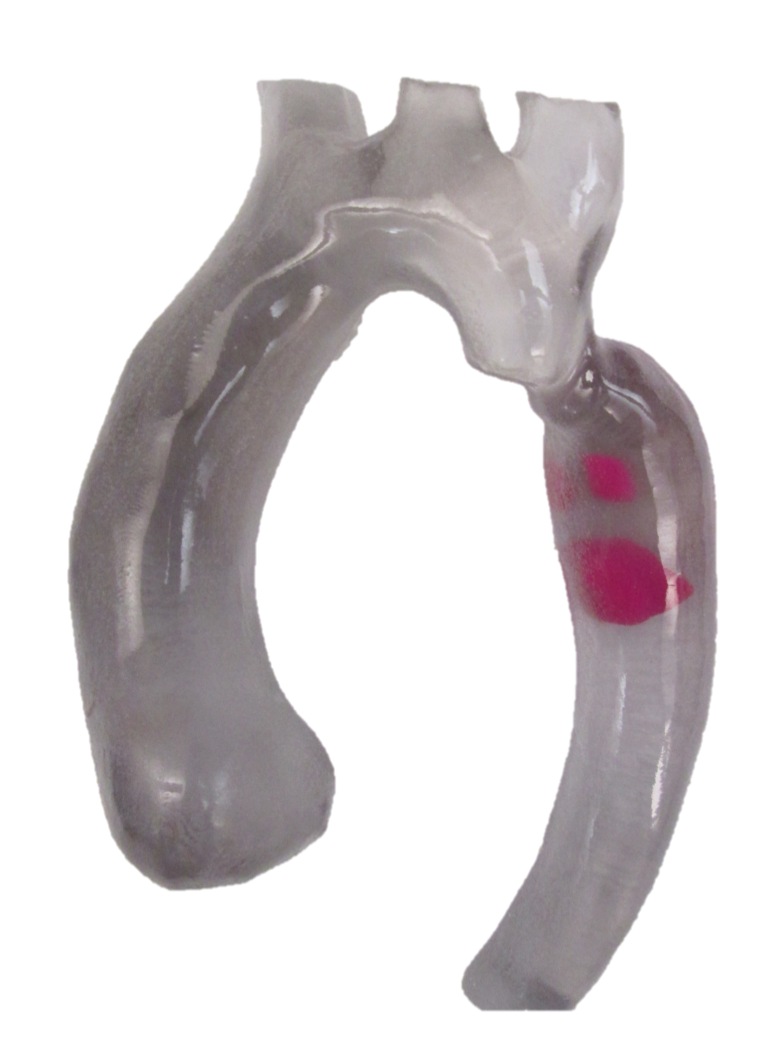
Aortic arch with thrombus modeled using Materialise Mimics.

== Gallery ==
Image import from CT (DICOM)

Image segmentation

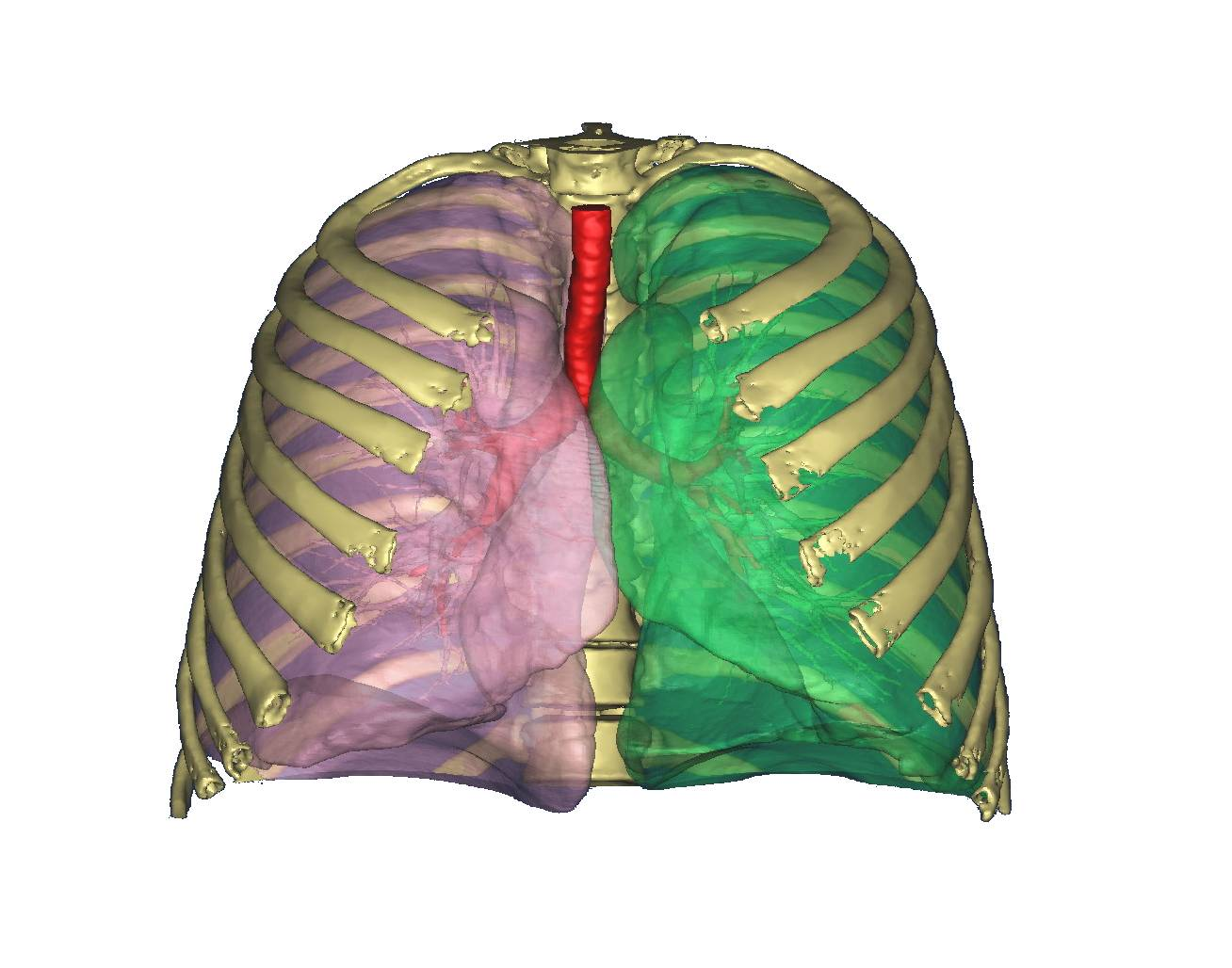
3D model

== See also ==
- 3D modeling
- 3D Slicer
- Computer representation of surfaces
- Computed tomography
- Medical imaging
