= Femoropopliteal bypass =

Leg artery surgical procedure

Popliteal bypass surgery
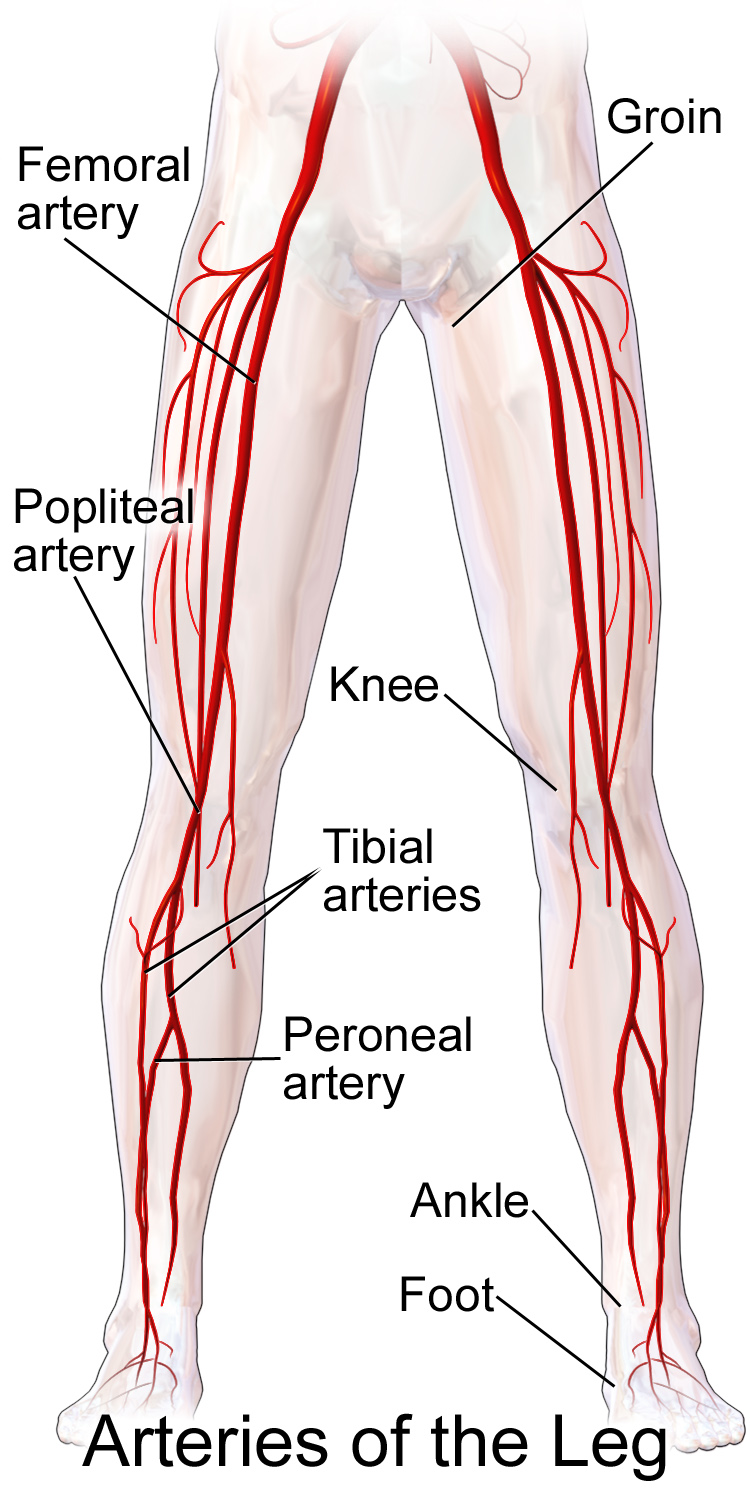
- Illustration depicting the femoral arteries and popliteal arteries (anterior view).
- Other names: Femoral-popliteal bypass surgery, femoropopliteal bypass surgery, fem-pop
- Specialty: Vascular surgery

Popliteal bypass surgery, more commonly known as femoropopliteal bypass (FPB, fem-pop, etc.) or more generally as lower extremity bypass surgery, is a surgical procedure used to treat diseased leg arteries above or below the knee. It is used as a medical intervention to salvage limbs that are at risk of amputation and to improve walking ability in people with severe intermittent claudication (leg muscle pain) and ischemic rest pain.

Popliteal bypass surgery is a common type of peripheral bypass surgery which carries blood from the femoral artery of the thigh to the end of the popliteal artery behind the knee. The femoral artery runs along the thigh and extends to become the popliteal artery which runs posteriorly to the knee and femur. Smaller arteries carry blood supply from the popliteal artery to the calf and into the foot. Blockages caused by plaque build-up or atherosclerosis in any of these arteries can reduce leg blood circulation, causing leg pain that may interfere with daily life.

Standard popliteal bypass surgery involves the bypass of the popliteal artery. During surgery, incisions are made depending on the location of the blockage. Usually, a healthy vein is located and sewn above and below the blockage to bypass the narrowed or blocked femoral artery. This allows the blood to be redirected to flow through the new healthy vessel around the blockage. In some cases, synthetic graft materials (such as polytetrafluoroethylene) are used instead of a vein graft.

== Uses ==
Femoropopliteal bypass surgery is mainly used to treat cases of femoral artery blockage that cause more severe symptoms that restrict completion of daily tasks such as peripheral artery disease and claudication, or cases that have not responded well to other treatment options. Before surgery is considered, adjustments are made to lifestyle habits such as quitting smoking or exercising more, or using medications, to relieve or improve symptoms.

Claudication refers to pain in the lower limbs that may be felt while exercising, walking, or simply while resting. A blocked femoral artery reduces the blood flow to the areas of the thigh and calf, causing the pain that leads to claudication. Severe pain caused by claudication can lead to a person having very restricted ability to move, and pain while resting is often a sign that the condition has worsened. Claudication is also considered a symptom of peripheral artery disease.

Popliteal bypass surgery may be performed on people with the following symptoms and conditions:

- Disruption in daily life or the ability to walk from intermittent claudication
- Persistent wounds in the leg
- Infection or gangrene
- Ischemic rest pain (due to lack of blood circulation resulting in leg pain at rest)

=== Efficiency ===
Generally, a vein bypass lasts at least 5 years in 60-70 percent of people. However about one-quarter to one-third of people will need additional procedures and follow-ups to maintain the condition of the graft. To minimise postoperative complications and a second bypass, correct postoperative care and surgical techniques must be used.

In comparison, synthetic grafts are more likely to become occluded in the future than using the person's blood vessel. A synthetic graft remains open in 33 to 50 out of 100 people 5 years after Popliteal bypass surgery was carried out, whereas using veins, the bypass remains unobstructed in 66 out of 100 people. Moreover, the particular vein, great saphenous vein was shown to be more durable over the years after surgery. Also, when comparing the efficacy of using PTFE or the great saphenous vein in people with claudication and critical limb ischemia, the latter showed better long term results.

A second bypass may be required if a blockage forms in the bypass graft later on. Over time, there is a decreasing trend of percentage patency (likelihood a vessel will remain open) in popliteal bypass surgery, 88% in the first year, 79% and 76% at 3 and 5 years respectively. Environmental conditions and overall patient health may also affect the patency of the graft.

== Complications ==
Since the operation involves multiple cuts being made on the leg, this relatively high risk surgery involves several risks. Some complications are common for all types of leg associated surgery, while some are specific to popliteal bypass surgery. Complications include but not limited to the following:

In the study of 6,007 people carried out popliteal bypass surgery, the overall rate of morbidity and mortality was 36.8% and 2.3% respectively within 30 days post-surgery. However, there are variations in studies of mortality as one particular study did not find any person deaths. The pre-existing risk factors in people can affect mortality rates, with common mortality factors being heart failure, myocardial infarction, diabetes mellitus, infection, and stroke.

=== Infection ===
Although antibiotics are generally given before and after surgery, people are still susceptible to wound infections and there is a 7.8% incidence of popliteal bypass surgery associated infections. Infection contraction is common in popliteal bypass surgery because of the poor blood circulation to the area, poor circulation means that the wounds will heal slower and the incision sites will have a higher chance of becoming infected.

The infection of the vascular graft prosthesis occurs in every 1 in 500 people, under such circumstance the removal of the graft is needed. Graft infection is strongly associated with high morbidity and mortality. An obvious sign of a graft infection is the drainage of the sinus tract. Diabetes mellitus and redoing of the bypass graft are associated with a higher chance for graft infection.

=== Bleeding ===
Occasionally, there may be leakage of fluid or blood from the incision wound, a study shows that 7.4 percent people are affected within 30 days post operation. However this normally settles in time and does not indicate a problem with the bypass itself.

=== Heart problems ===
People with peripheral artery disease undergoing popliteal bypass surgery are also more susceptible to myocardial infarction and abnormal heart rhythms, as patients requiring popliteal bypass are more likely to have higher cholesterol levels and higher blood pressure. The excess strain and damage caused by HBP and high cholesterol level can cause atherosclerosis. Over time, the coronary artery narrows and increases the patient's chance of getting a heart attack. Myocardial infarctions can also be caused by graft failure and hypoperfusion.

=== Lymphedema ===
The risk of lymphedema exists in 29 percent of patients, where leg swelling typically lasts 2 to 3 months. Lymphedema can be caused by blockages in the lymphatic system, leading to insufficient lymph drainage and fluid build-up in the leg. Though it is incurable, swelling of the leg is usually temporary. Treatment like compression stockings, meticulous skin care or doing remedial exercises may help ameliorate the symptoms.

=== Amputation ===
In rare situations when blockages severely disrupt or stop blood circulation, critical limb ischemia occurs. In cases of ischaemia, insufficient blood available for tissues to survive leads to gangrene and rest pain, in which case amputation is required. The major goals of amputation are to remove dead tissues, relieve pain and promote wound healing.

=== Blood clots ===
With surgery operations such as popliteal bypass, there will be an increased probability of blood clot formation. In rare cases, a part of the clot in the leg breaks free and travels to the lungs, this is also known as a pulmonary embolism. A blockage in the blood vessels of the lung can be formed by pulmonary embolism, and this could cause excess fluid build-up in the lung. This condition is also known as pulmonary edema, which is the excess fluid present in the lungs, more specifically, the accumulation of excess fluid in the air sacs of the lung, leading to the impairment of gas exchange and potentially respiratory failure.

The incidence of early graft thrombosis is between 5-15% for popliteal bypass surgery. The cause of thrombosis is commonly due to technical errors of the surgery, other causes may include stenosis, narrow vein grafts, a low cardiac output and the compression of the graft. In such cases, heparin (anticoagulant) and thrombectomy can be used to treat graft thrombosis.

== Procedure ==
The surgery is generally performed under general anaesthesia. The surgeon makes an incision in the upper leg, and a graft either man-made or the patient's vein is sewn to both ends of the artery. The graft reroutes the blood flow around the blocked artery, allowing for adequate supply back to the parts of the leg. Generally, it is preferred where possible, a healthy vein is used to make the graft as it has shown to have a better outcome of the procedure. In cases however where a vein can not be used, materials such as polytetrafluoroethylene (PTFE) or Dacron are often used to make the graft.

1. The person is brought to the operating room lying face up.
2. An intravenous (IV) line is placed in either the collarbone, hand or arm. Catheters may be put in the wrist and neck area to monitor the heart and blood pressure of the patient, as well as for obtaining blood samples.
3. The patient's blood pressure, blood oxygen level, heart rate and breathing is monitored during surgery by an anaesthesiologist.
4. Both local anaesthesia or general anaesthesia may be used in popliteal bypass surgery. For local anaesthesia, a nasal cannula is needed to provide patients with sufficient oxygen. For general anaesthesia, after the patient sedated, a breathing tube is used instead to transport oxygen and connects to a ventilator to aid patient breathing.
5. A catheter is used to drain patient urine from the bladder.
6. To prevent bacterial infection, antibiotics are given to the patient via IV.
7. After cleaning the skin over the surgical site, the surgeon will make an incision in the leg, which is dependent on the portion of the arteries to be bypassed. The use of either a man-made graft or a vein from the leg is determined by the surgeon.
8. Both ends of the chosen graft are sewn using fine stitches above and below the blockage site of the target artery.
9. After sewing, an arteriogram is run to make sure normal blood flow is returned to the leg through the new bypass graft and the incision is closed using staples or stitches.
10. Depending on the patient's blood pressure, blood pressure medicine may be given via IV during and after the procedure to keep it within normal range.
11. A sterile bandage or dressing will be applied over the treated area.

=== Types of grafts ===
Blood vessel grafts often come from the same leg of the bypass site, which are arteries above and below the knee. These grafts can only be removed and prepared during surgery at the time of the bypass. However, in some cases a leg vein is left in place and connected to the artery (in situ procedure). Under this circumstance, an angioscope (a flexible medical tube with a camera) is used to aid this procedure.

As mentioned, synthetic graft material like PTFE may be an option if the surgeon does not find suitable veins. PTFE is commonly used in bypasses involving arteries at or above the knee.

A 2018 Cochrane review found moderate-quality evidence for improved long term success (60 months) for autologous vein grafts when compared to prosthetic materials for above-knee bypasses. There was low-quality evidence of a small secondary benefit for Dacron over PTFE for above-knee bypass. For below-knee bypasses the evidence was to uncertain to draw conclusions as to best graft type.

=== Post surgery care ===
In order to reduce the risk of complications after surgery, patients should refrain from smoking because it can decrease blood circulation, which makes the graft more likely to fail. Walking is also essential during early recovery periods, it may help reduce swelling to facilitate wound healing and aids collateral artery formation in the leg, which can improve blood flow around blockages. Often, physiotherapy treatments are given to patients after operation to help the patients ease into walking and other movements to keep the leg muscle flexible. Other factors such as maintaining a healthy diet and regular exercise may also prevent unnecessary strain on the leg arteries from weight gain. The above interventions after surgery can improve blood circulation overall and reduce the risks of getting a second bypass.

=== Alternatives ===
In some cases where the blockage is not as severe or limb threatening, alternative procedures that may take place are percutaneous transluminal angioplasty or endarterectomy. These procedures are used when possible as they are considered to be minimally invasive, in turn reducing recovery time and possible complications post-surgery.

== History ==
Historically, the first incidence of using a vein to bypass a femoral artery was in 1948 to treat a patient suffering from a foot ulcer. Although the bypass technique was not a new discovery, it was not yet widely used and known. In 1962, a new surgical technique, otherwise known as the in situ procedure was developed and used on veins to improve bypass. It works by increasing the radius of the vein to increase blood flow along the blood vessel. Today, it has now been proved that the in situ procedure is better suited in vein bypasses in the lower leg compared to the upper leg, particularly for treating advanced ischemic disease in the lower leg.
