= Biothermia =

Biothermia is the process of heating living tissue using non-ionizing radiation. Sources can include magnetic (inductive), electromagnetic (radiowaves), or conductive (organic materials).

== See also ==
- Bioelectrogenesis
- Bioheat transfer
- Electroreception
