= Nano-scaffold =

Medical process used to regrow tissue and bone

Nano-scaffolding or nanoscaffolding is a medical process used to regrow tissue and bone, including limbs and organs. The nano-scaffold is a three-dimensional structure composed of polymer fibers very small that are scaled from a Nanometer (10^{−9} m) scale. Developed by the American military, the medical technology uses a microscopic apparatus made of fine polymer fibers called a scaffold. Damaged cells grip to the scaffold and begin to rebuild missing bone and tissue through tiny holes in the scaffold. As tissue grows, the scaffold is absorbed into the body and disappears completely.

Nano-scaffolding has also been used to regrow burned skin. The process cannot grow complex organs like hearts.

Historically, research on nano-scaffolds dates back to at least the late 1980s when Simon showed that electrospinning could be used to produce nano- and submicron-scale polymeric fibrous scaffolds specifically intended for use as in vitro cell and tissue substrates. This early use of electrospun fibrous lattices for cell culture and tissue engineering showed that various cell types would adhere to and proliferate upon polycarbonate fibers. It was noted that as opposed to the flattened morphology typically seen in 2D culture, cells grown on the electrospun fibers exhibited a more rounded 3-dimensional morphology generally observed of tissues in vivo.

== Mechanism of tissue regeneration using nanoscaffolds ==
Nano-scaffolding is very small, 100 times smaller than the human hair and is built out of biodegradable fibers. The use of this scaffolding allows more effective use of stem cells and quicker regeneration. Electrospun nanofibers are prepared using microscopic tubes that range between 100 and 200 nanometers in diameter. These entangle with each other in the form of a web as they're produced. Electrospinning allows the construction of these webs to be controlled in the sense of the tube's diameter, thickness, and the material being used. Nano-scaffolding is placed into the body at the site where the regeneration process will occur. Once injected, stem cells are added to the scaffolding. Stem cells that are attached to a scaffold are shown to be more successful in adapting to their environment and performing the task of regeneration. The nerve ends in the body will attach to the scaffolding by weaving in-between the openings. This will cause them to act as a bridge to connect severed sections. Over time the scaffolding will dissolve and safely exit the body leaving healthy nerves in its place.

This technology is the combination of stem cell research and nanotechnology. The ability to be able to repair damaged nerves is a great challenge for many researchers as well as a step forward for the medical field. This would allow doctors to repair nerves damaged in an accident, like third degree burns. The technology however, is still in its infancy and is still not capable of regenerating complex organs like a heart, although it can already be used to create skin, bone and nails. Nano scaffolding has been shown to be four to seven times more effective in keeping the stem cells alive in the body, which would allow them to perform their job more effectively. This technology can be used to save limbs that would otherwise need amputation. Nanoscaffolding provides a large surface area for the material being produced, along with changeable chemical and physical properties. This allows them to be applicable in many different types of technological fields.

== Background ==
=== Tissue engineering ===
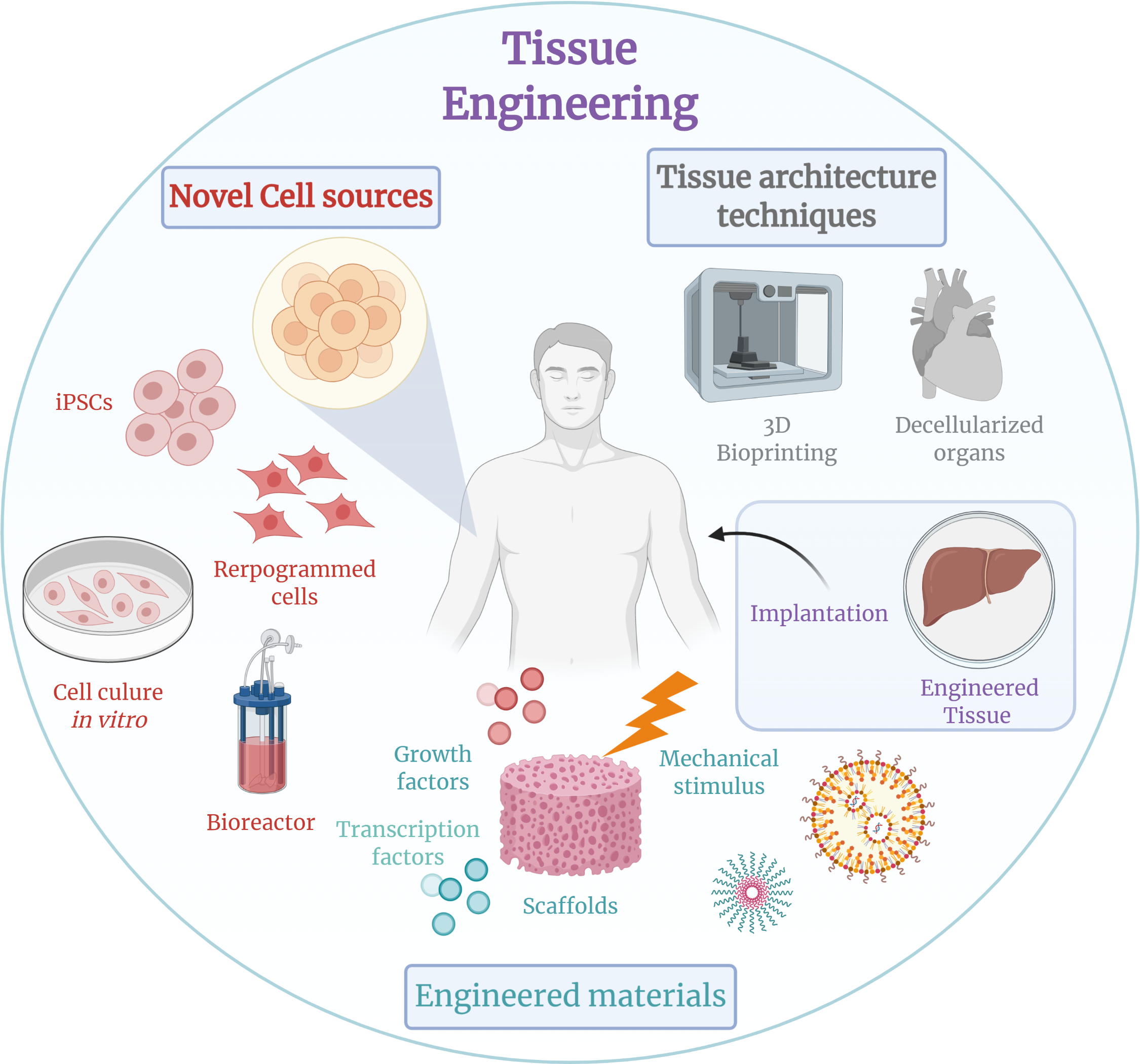
Tissue engineering consists of the use of cells, scaffolds, and varying tissue architecture techniques to restore, replace, and regenerate damaged body tissue.

Tissue engineering consists of the use of cells, scaffolds, and varying tissue architecture techniques to restore, replace, and regenerate damaged body tissue. The goal of tissue engineering is to restore, replace, or regenerate damaged body tissue. Nano-scaffolds along with cells and growth factor signals are utilized in tissue engineering applications. Tissue engineering applications are designed to overcome hurdles associated with allotransplantation, which include unavailable donors, complex surgeries, and postoperative care. In 2015, the tissue engineering global market was estimated at $23 billion, and expected to reach $94.2 billion by 2022. The anticipation of fast growth was due to an increase in bone and joint disorders, with musculoskeletal regenerative medicines comprising 26.4% of the regenerative medicine market.

=== Extracellular Matrix ===
Most human cells within tissues anchor to the solid extracellular matrix (ECM). ECM components vary between various types of body tissues. The ECM acts as a natural "scaffolding". The ECM has five major function:

1. Provide cellular support and microenvironment necessary to enable cell growth, migration, and signal response.
2. Provide tissue mechanical properties, such as rigidity and elasticity. These properties vary to provide for specific tissue functions.
3. Provide bioactive regulators to trigger cell responses.
4. Provide a reservoir for cellular growth factors to enhance cell responses.
5. Provide a degradable physical environment to accommodate ECM remodeling in response to developmental, physiological, and pathological inputs during tissue processes.

The goal of the nano-scaffold is to mimic the ECM functions to encourage tissue restoration, replacement, and regeneration. Both ECM variations between tissue types and the complexity of the ECM make nano-scaffold mimicry difficult.

== Nano-Scaffold ==
In order to mimic the ECM, the nano-scaffold follows four main features and functions:

1. Architecture: Must provide empty space for new tissue to form. Nano-scaffold biomaterials must be porous to allow for nutrient transportation to the tissue within the construct. However, despite the porous architecture, the nano-scaffold must be mechanically strong enough to withstand physiological loads.
2. Cyto- and tissue compatibility: Nano-scaffolds must support cell attachment, growth, and differentiation prior to implantation in vitro and after in vivo implantation.
3. Bioactivity: Biomaterials within the nano-scaffold must facilitate and regulate cell and tissue activity, as in natural host tissue.
4. Mechanical property: Must provide shape and stability to the damaged tissue. The mechanical properties of the nano-scaffold determine cell differentiation, morphology, and characteristics due to the cell ability to sense substrate stiffness.

=== Approach ===
There are four major nano-scaffolding approaches, which include pre-made porous scaffolds for cell seeding, decellularized ECM from allogeneic or xenogeneic tissues for cell seeding, cell sheets with self-secreted ECM, and cell encapsulation in a self-assembled hydrogel matrix. Each approach contains varying materials, fabrication methods, and resulting mechanical properties. In addition to these four approaches, metallic nano-particles have been researched to enhance the mechanical properties of nano-scaffolds. Nanofiber electrospinning is another fabrication method for nano-scaffolding.

==== Pre-made porous scaffolds for cell seeding ====
A wide array of nano-scaffold biomaterials have been used for pre-made porous scaffolds for cell seeding. These biomaterials can be classified as either natural or synthetic. Natural biomaterials are obtained from natural sources, which include but are not limited to, ECM from allografts or xenografts, calcium phosphates, and organic polymers, such as proteins, polysaccharides, lipids, and polynucleotides. Natural biomaterials increase nano-scaffold biocompatibility, but limit physical and mechanical stability. Natural biomaterials risk a negative immune response in the implantation host due to the allogeneic or xenogeneic source. Synthetic biomaterials can be subclassified as organic or inorganic. Compared to natural, synthetic biomaterials are more easily tailored to varying tissue hardness, and therefore are applicable to a wider variety of tissues. Synthetic biomaterials are less biocompatible and result in decreased cell attachment and growth. Surface and bulk properties can be altered within a synthetic biomaterials in an attempt to increase the biocompatibility of a surface.

Various fabrication techniques have been employed to fabricate a porous scaffold, such as porogens within biomaterials, solid free-form or rapid prototyping, and utilizing woven or non-woven fibers. To employ porogens in the nano-scaffold biomaterial, solid materials in solids or dissolved in solvents are combined with the porogen. Porogens include carbon dioxide, water, and paraffin. One the biomaterial is fabricated, the porogens are removed with methods such as sublimation, evaporation, and melting. Therefore, when the porogens are removed the porous scaffold is left behind with pores. To fabricate with solid free-form or rapid prototyping, methods such as laser sintering, stereolithography, and 3D printing have been utilized. These methods use light or heat transfer to bond or crosslink the biomaterial being used. Cross-linking provides enhanced material strength. The fabrication technique utilizing woven and non-woven fiber structures provides a porous structure when the fibers are bonded with thermal energy. Electrospinning is utilized via application of high voltages in a polymer solution. A spinning fiber jet is formed when the electrostatic forces surpass the forces within the polymer solution. The pre-made porous scaffolding method allows for a defined structure formation. With fabricating allowing an intricate structure formation, the nano-scaffolds utilizing this method can be tuned to resemble specific tissue ECMs.

==== Decellularized ECM from allogeneic and xenogeneic tissues for cell seeding ====
Decellularized ECM from allogeneic and xenogeneic tissues have been utilized in tissue engineering for heart valves, vessels, nerves, tendons, and ligaments. To utilize the ECM from allogeneic or xenogeneic tissues the cellular antigens must be removed due to implant recipient immune response. Decellularization is conducted with a combination of physical, chemical, and enzymatic processes. Freeze-thaw cycles or ionic solutions have been utilized to lyse cell membranes. Trypsin/EDTA treatments are then utilized to separate ECM cellular components. Detergents solubilize and remove cell cytoplasm's and nuclei. The decellularized ECM with preserved growth factors is utilized as the nano-scaffold. Decellularized ECM nano-scaffolding provides mechanical properties closer to natural values than other methods due to utilizing a natural ECM structure.

==== Cell sheets with self-secreted ECM ====
In the cell sheet approach, cells are utilized to secrete an ECM for scaffolding. Cells are cultured until confluence on a thermo-responsive polymer. Hydrophobicity is thermally-regulated repeatedly to detach multiple cell sheet layers. Loading capabilities of this approach are limited due to the use of thin cell sheets. Cell sheets with self-secreted ECM provide a high cell density and tight cell association within the nano-scaffold.

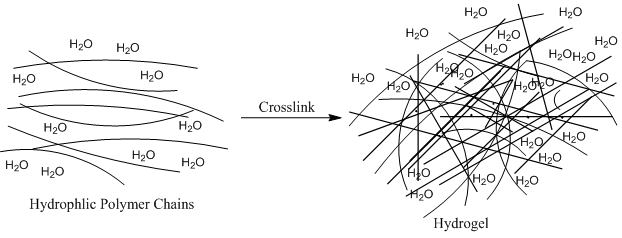
The hydrogel structure consists of cross-linked hydrophilic polymer chains.

==== Cell encapsulation in a self-assembled hydrogel matrix ====
The hydrogel structure consists of cross-linked hydrophilic polymer chains. A semi-permeable membrane or a homogeneous solid mass encapsulate cells. Natural and synthetic hydrogels are used to encapsulate the cells. Algae and sodium alginate provide a commonly used source for polysaccharides. Other natural biomaterials utilized include agarose and chitosan. Synthetic biomaterials include poly(ethylene glycol) (PEG) and polyvinyl alcohol (PVA). Prior to initiation, the biomaterials exist as a liquid monomer. The biomaterials are mixed with cells. Once initiated by pH, temperature, ionic strength, or light control, the biomaterials self-assembles into a solid polymer meshwork. Since the cells are mixed before initiation, this allows for the fabrication of the nano-scaffold construct, and cell seeding in one step. This method contains low mechanical properties due to the highly moldable structure of the nano-scaffold and is not ideal for load-bearing applications.

==== Metallic nano-scaffolds ====
Metallic nanoparticles within polymers increase mechanical strength and biocompatibility of nano-scaffolds. Copper, gold, iron oxide, platinum, palladium, strontium, titanium, zinc, and their oxides have been utilized in bone tissue regenerative applications. These nano-particles have been incorporated within polymers such as poly (lactic-co-glycolic acid) (PLDA), poly (L-lactic acid) (PLLA), poly (caprolactone (PCL), collagen, hyaluronic acid, silk, alginate, and fibrin. Copper nanoparticles within nano-scaffolding enhances antioxidant and anti-diabetic activities. Copper nanoparticles within nano-scaffolding can stimulate angiogenesis, cell migration, and proliferation of endothelial cells. Gold nanoparticles within nano-scaffolding induces osteogenic differentiation due to signal transduction from mechanical stimuli. Platinum nanoparticles and palladium nanoparticles within nano-scaffolding reduces oxidative stresses which decreases disease progression. Silver nanoparticles within nano-scaffolding are antimicrobial and aid in preventing postoperative pathogenic infections. Silver nanoparticles within nano-scaffolding have been used to develop microbe resistant coating. Titanium nanoparticles within nano-scaffolding are highly porous, which is ideal for cell proliferation. Zinc nanoparticles within nano-scaffolding decrease the number of reactive oxygen species, which are associated with failure of implants due to bacterial infection.

==== Nano-fiber electrospinning ====
Electrospinning systems consist of high voltage power, material delivery, and fiber collection units. The high voltages produce charged polymer solution, which exits from the delivery unit in a jet form. The jet of polymer solution is elongated and the solvent either evaporates or solidifies. Fibers are then collected in the collection unit. Flat plated are utilized to randomly collect the fibers. Rotors are utilized to rotate the collector to collect aligned fibers. Concentric collectors are utilized to collect the fibers in a disc, drum, or cone shape. Compared to random fibers, aligned fibers enhance integrin signaling pathways, and contain anisotropic properties similar to ECMs characterized by high degrees of orientation. Fibers may be fabricated from natural and synthetic polymers, including collagen, gelatin, elastin, silk, poly(l-lactic acid) (PLLA), ploy(glycolic acid) (PGA), poly(ԑ-caprolactone) (PCL), and poly(lactic-co-glycolic) acid (PLGA). The morphology of fibers fabricated through electrospinning varies with the solution properties of the polymer, hydrostatic pressure, temperature, and humidity. Nanofiber electrospinning can create loosely connected porous nanofiber mats, which can be fabricated with varying patterns for varying applications. Electrospinning nanofibers limits the three-dimensional capabilities of the nano-scaffold, which decreases cell differentiation and gene expressions. Three-dimensional electrospun scaffolds have been created by stacking multiple layers and then seeding cells within the scaffold.

=== Fabrications ===
With the new advancement in nanotechnologies, there are many methods of fabrication that improve upon the methods previously mentioned . To appropriately emulate the complexity of native tissue and extracellular matrix(ECM) architecture, the adoption of nanotechnology becomes an integral part of scaffold implant production.

==== Airbrush ====
In 1936, Norton patented the first blow spinning device, most recently in 2015 research was published describing a device with concentric nozzles where a polymer solution was inserted into a stream of flowing gas in order to form nano-fibers from polymers like polystyrene. The new developments lead to the technique of airbrushing for nano-scaffold fabrication.

Airbrushing is a technique for fiber fabrication that involves two parallel concentric fluid streams; a polymer dissolved in a volatile solvent and a pressurized gas that flows around the polymer solution, generating fibers that are deposited in the direction of gas flow. This method is more favored compared to electrospinning due to the fact that it is less expensive and is easier to interface. This method has the ability to deposit conformal fibers onto both planar and non-planar substrates with a deposition rate that is relatively ten times faster than electrospinning.

Just like commercial airbrushes the nanofibrous airbrush technique can be used to "paint" nanofibers onto a more extensive range of targets and for the carrier solvent to evaporate quickly before the polymer fibers deposit on the collection surface. Although acute exposure to high concentrations of a solvent such as acetone may be toxic, studies have shown that SBS from acetone directly onto cells did not affect viability, resulting in preventing issue of biocompatibility.

Complication of the airbrush technique arises when formation of fiber mats with the local fiber bundles, this is induced by the morphological differences in fibers and crystalline structures.

==== Phase Separation ====
In 1999, researchers(Need to identify) pioneered a method creating nano-fibrous polyester based scaffolds with high porosity and sub-micron fibers dimensions through the method of phase separation.

Phase separation, also called as phase inversion, is a technique that has been employed to generate porous polymers scaffolds by promoting the separation of a polymeric solution into two phases: a polymer-rich phase and a polymer-poor phase.

Polymer solution is driven to separate in phases through cooling or non-solvent exchange, in a way that the polymer is not thermodynamically miscible anymore and forms polymer-rich domains within the solvent. Next, the solvent is extracted and the scaffold is frozen to maintain the structure. Lastly, lyophilization forms a fibrous scaffold with diameters between 50 and 500 nm(nanometers) and able to exhibit 98.5% porosity. Again this method of fabrication is used to create nano-fibrous scaffolds out of aliphatic polyesters.

Solvents that are used include THF( developing the best results), DMF, THF/methanol, THF/acetone, dioxane/methodal, dioxane/H_{2}O, and dioxane/acetone).

Phase separation approximates more to conventional foams with larger pore sizes, implying that this method would be prone to cell infiltration, making it favorable for tissue engineering.. Phase separation can also lead to smaller pores being produced, however there is difficulty to control the diameter of fibrous due to the fact that the initial polymer concentration does not lead to larger fiber diameters in phase separated scaffolds.

This method of fabrication promotes cell growth, proliferation and differentiation, making it suitable to be used as tissues for artificial organs, neural networks, bioreactors, cell sources and drug delivery systems.

==== STEP techniques ====
"Spinneret based turntable engineered parameters" or STEP technique has been required for nanofiber networks with controllable fiber diameters, controllable spacing, and for the orientation of individual fibers. During this technique micro/nano fibers are pulled from the pendant solution droplet and allows for a collection of highly aligned fibers of uniform dimensions on the substrate. It promotes control of the dimensions of the fibers deposited in the aligned configurations, thus creating a platform for the investigation of cellular dynamics and cellular adhesion on scaffolds. The technique allows precise spacing and orientation of fibers into planar or non-planar structures using a wide spectrum of polymers. However, there is a difficulty in obtaining fibers smaller than 100 nm and as well as limitation to viscoelastic materials used in the STEP technique.

Nano-fibrous scaffolds, created from STEP techniques, have the ability to be used for a wide range of applications in tissue engineering

== Applications ==
=== Bone Scaffolds ===
By 2012 the US over half a million people receive bone defect repairs yearly with an estimated cost of $2.5 million and has doubled in recent years. In the US, bone is one of the most transplanted tissues and the increasing demand of bone grafts and substitutes was estimated to be 3.3 billion of revenue. Investments in research in tissue engineering solutions have had a massive market especially for bone.

As a scaffolding tissue, bone is responsible for support, protection, load bearing and hematopoietic functions. For small defects the human bone has the ability to continuously remodel and rebuild upon itself. However, large scale defects, inflammations caused by accidents, infections and tumors make it difficult for the bone to heal, requiring external interventions. The growing shortage of donors, rejection of transplants, and mechanical failure have made it difficult to have lasting solutions. Advancements in nanotechnology have enabled the applications for 3D printing in tissue engineering for the development of Bone scaffolds.

Bone scaffolds are typically made of porous biodegradable materials that provide the mechanical support during repair regeneration of damaged and diseased bone. The design of the scaffolds presents a surface that promotes cell attachments, growth, and differentiation, while providing a porous network for tissue growth. For bone scaffold continuous ingrowth of bone tissue, interconnected porosity is important as it can allow nutrients and molecules to transport to inner parts of scaffold to facilitate cell ingrowth, vascularization, as well as waste material removal.

The 3D bioprinting method has been used to fabricate more ideal structural scaffolds with better control of pore morphology, pore size and porosity. 3D printing can be essential to bone scaffolds as it takes into account the high degree of porosity together with high mechanical strength, which is critical for the bone scaffold to perform.

=== Heart Muscle Scaffolds ===
Cardiac muscle, on the other hand, has an elastic modulus of only around 10 MPa, 3 orders of magnitude smaller than bone. However, it experiences constant cyclic loading as the heart pumps. This means that the scaffold must be both tough and elastic, a property achieved using polymeric materials.

=== Spinal Cord Engineering ===
Spinal cord injury can be seriously detrimental to normal form and function in the human body, often leading to major loss of motor and sensory function that can even affect the whole of the body below the injury level. The number of global spinal cord injury cases rose to 27.04 million in 2016 where each patient can cost the economy from $1–5 million for a given case. As a result, there is a significant need for novel solutions to address the issue.

Novel biomaterial and tissue engineering strategies have been developed recently to address the need, mainly centering around formulating nanoscaffolds that fill the gap created in the injury site and that foster a pro-regenerative environment that help to facilitate restoration of the spinal cord structure and function. This is achieved through physically connecting the exposed areas in the spinal cord via scaffold as well as providing a favorable environment for regenerative cell types such as mesenchymal stem cells and Schwann cells and for promoting axon restoration and remyelination. Olfactory ensheathing cells, stem cells, and other neural progenitor cells play a large part in creating a stimulating environment for regenerative purposes.

In order to make these nanoscaffolds, both natural and synthetic polymers are used in their synthesis. For natural polymers, hyaluronic acid and collagen are two of the major candidates used in industry today. Hyaluronic acid is a major component of the extracellular matrix and has variable properties depending on its molecular weight, which is useful in compensating for properties necessary for a good scaffold. Collagen is also a major component of the extracellular matrix, most importantly in central nervous tissue where it has good histocompatibility and supports adhesion and growth.
