= Lurie Biomedical Engineering Center =

Ann and Robert H. Lurie Biomedical Engineering Building
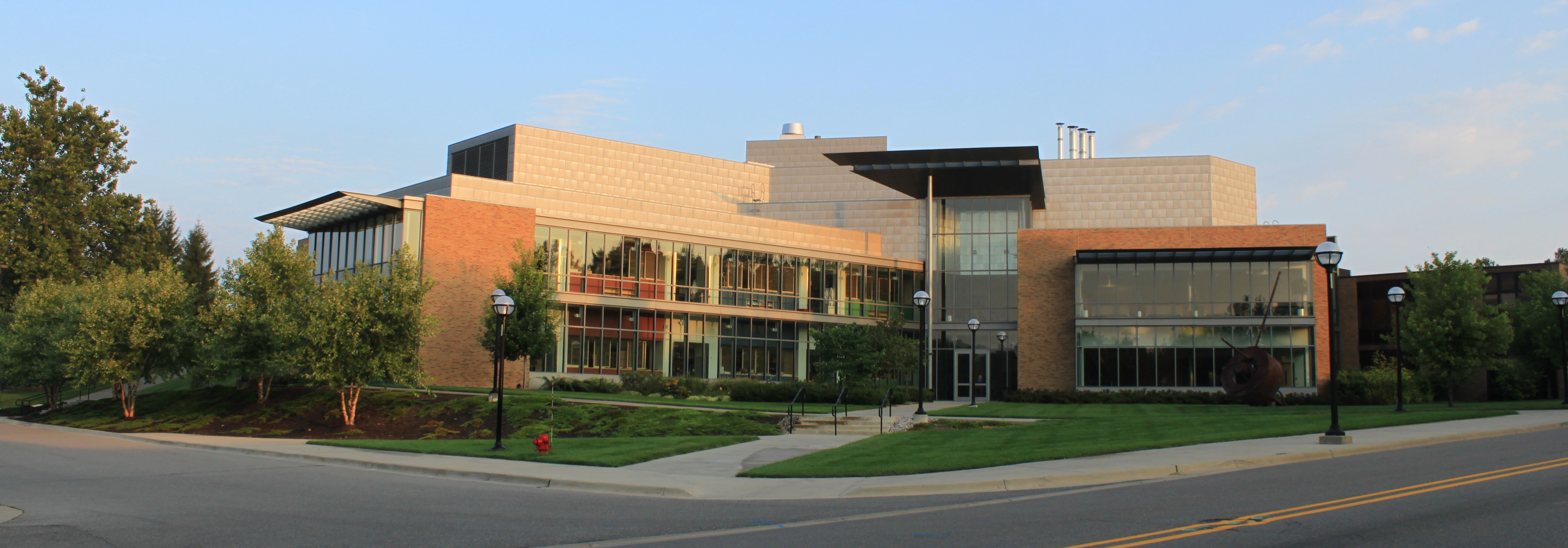
- Interactive map of the Ann and Robert H. Lurie Biomedical Engineering Building area

General information
- Location: Ann Arbor, Michigan, United States
- Coordinates: 42°17′19.70″N 83°42′48.68″W
- Construction started: 2004
- Completed: 2006
- Opening: August 2006

Design and construction
- Architect: ZGF Architects
- Engineer: KPFF Consulting Engineers
- Main contractor: Skanska

The Ann and Robert H. Lurie Biomedical Engineering Building officially opened in August 2006. It was part of an expansion of the University of Michigan Biomedical Engineering Department (BME). The building houses researchers previously spread through several different University of Michigan campus locations.

The project consists of 31,670 sq ft (2,942 m^{2}) of new construction in the form of an addition, with 23,370 sq ft (2,171 m^{2}) of renovated space in an existing building. Programs in the facility emphasize cellular and molecular biotechnologies. The addition contains research laboratory and support space. The renovation provides wet and dry teaching labs, classrooms, a computer classroom, support spaces, conference rooms, meeting rooms, faculty offices, a kitchen, and clerical support spaces.
