= SENSE lab =

Canadian research laboratory

The SENSE Lab, or Sensory Encoding and Neuro-Sensory Engineering Lab is part of the Capital District Health Authority in Halifax, Nova Scotia and affiliated with Dalhousie University.

The lab has an clinical, engineering, and physiology focus on all aspects of disorders of the ear, including communication, balance regulation and auditory and vestibular perception. It is particularly interested in multisensory integration, environmental-sensory interactions, and cognitive-sensory interactions. Their research encompasses novel transducers, novel measurement devices and novel complex probes of sensory and cognitive function. They also develop commercial and general consumer applications in these areas.

The research facility is located in the Division of Otolaryngology, Department of Surgery, Capital District Health Authority, Halifax, and is affiliated with the Department of Biomed Engineering, School of Human Communication Disorders, the Department of Psychology, School of Physiotherapy, and the Department of Anatomy & Neurobiology, Dalhousie University.
