= Surface and bulk erosion =

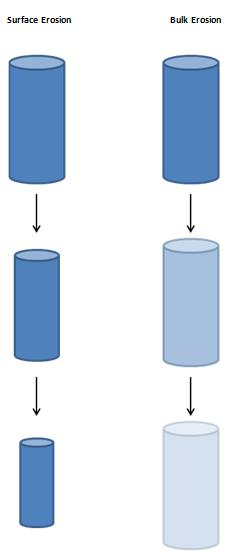
A diagram showing surface erosion (left) and bulk erosion (right). In surface erosion, the material only degrades on the surface which causes the material to “shed off” its surface over time. In bulk erosion, the material loses volume throughout equally, which is represented by the fading colors.

Surface and bulk erosion are two different forms of erosion that describe how a degrading polymer erodes. In surface erosion, the polymer degrades from the exterior surface. The inside of the material does not degrade until all the surrounding material around it has been degraded. In bulk erosion, degradation occurs throughout the whole material equally. Both the surface and the inside of the material degrade. Surface erosion and bulk erosion are not exclusive, many materials undergo a combination of surface and bulk erosion. Therefore, surface and bulk erosion can be thought of as a spectrum instead of two separate categories.

== Erosion Kinetics ==
In surface erosion, the erosion rate is directly proportional to the surface area of the material. For very thin materials, the surface area remains relatively constant when the material degrades, which allows surface erosion to be characterized as zero order release since the rate of degradation is constant. In bulk erosion, the erosion rate depends on the volume of the material. Due to degradation, the volume of the material decreases during bulk erosion causing the erosion rate to decrease over time. Therefore, bulk erosion rates are difficult to control since it is not zero order. To determine whether a polymer will undergo surface or bulk erosion, the degradation rate of the polymer in water (how fast the polymer reacts to water) and the rate of diffusion of water penetrating through the material must be considered. If the degradation process is faster than the diffusion process, surface erosion will occur since the material's surface will quickly degrade before water has time to diffuse and penetrate through the material. If the diffusion process is faster than the degradation process bulk erosion will occur because water penetrates through the material before significant erosion occurs on the surface. A kinetics of the erosion of a polymer can be modified by changing the diffusion process or the degradation process. For example, blending a polymer with another polymer that is very reactive to water will speed up the degradation process and cause surface erosion. On the other hand, decreasing the dimensions of a material will allow water to travel to the center of the material more quickly, which speeds up the diffusion process and causes bulk erosion.

== Mathematical Model ==
By mathematically modeling the rate of diffusion of water in the material and the rate of degradation of the material, it is possible to predict whether a certain material will undergo surface or bulk erosion by looking at the ratio between the two rates.

The rate of diffusion of water is modeled by the equation

$t_{\text{diffusion}} = \frac{<x>^2\pi}{4D}$

Where <x> is the mean length of the material and D is the diffusion coefficient of water inside the polymer.

The rate of degradation is modeled by the following equation

$t_{\text{erosion}} = \frac{\ln<x>-\ln\sqrt[3]{M \over N_\text{A}(N-1)*p}}{k}$

Where M = molecular weight of polymer, N_{A} = Avogadro constant, N = degree of polymerization, p = density of polymer, k = degradation rate

The ratio between diffusion time and degradation time gives us a dimensionless parameter ε called the erosion number.

$\text{Erosion Number} = \frac{t_{\text{diffusion}}}{t_{\text{erosion}}} = \frac{<x>^2\pi*k}{4D*(\ln<x>-\ln\sqrt[3]{M \over N_\text{A}(N-1)*p})}$

If ε≫1, surface erosion occurs. If ε≪1, bulk erosion occurs.

From the model above, it is clear that certain changing certain parameters can determine what kind of erosion a polymer goes through by either increasing or decreasing the rate of the degradation process or the diffusion process. The table below summarizes how a parameter can be modified to favor surface erosion or bulk erosion.

Parameter	Favors Surface Erosion	Favors Bulk Erosion
Size of material (<x>)	Increase	Decrease
Polymer molecular weight (M)	Increase	Decrease
Degradation rate (k)	Increase	Decrease
Density of polymer (p)	Decrease	Increase
Diffusion coefficient of water (D)	Decrease	Increase

== Applications ==
Since surface erosion is easier to control than bulk erosion, surface erosion is preferred in drug delivery where the release of the drug must be constant or be controlled by changing the dimensions of the material. A zero order release of a drug can be possible with surface erosion if a very thin material is used or if surface area is kept constant. Surface erosion is also useful for protecting water-soluble drugs until the time of desired drug release, because water will not penetrate through the polymer matrix and reach the drug until all the surrounding polymer has degraded. However, bulk erosion can be useful in situations that do not require controlled release, such as plastic degradation.
