= Intimal hyperplasia =

Medical condition

Intimal hyperplasia is the thickening of the tunica intima of a blood vessel as a complication of a reconstruction procedure or endarterectomy. Intimal hyperplasia is the universal response of a vessel to injury. It is a restenosis and this is an important reason of late bypass graft failure, particularly in vein and synthetic vascular grafts.

== Cause ==
Intimal hyperplasia is due to a dysfunction of endothelial cells which results in a reprogramming of the vascular smooth muscle cells (VSMCs). As a result, VSMCs proliferate and change their phenotype.

== Possible treatment ==
A possible treatment to avoid this could be hydrogen sulfide. Hydrogen sulfide (H_{2}S) works as a vasculoprotective gasotransmitter in the human body but is also tested to reduced intimal hyperplasia. There are different kinds of H_{2}S donors: NaHS (the reference in scientific literature despite the fact it is too toxic to use it in human patients) and STS (already used in patient to treat cyanide poisoning).

== See also ==
- Hyperplasia
- Medical grafting
