= Virginia Tech - Wake Forest University School of Biomedical Engineering & Sciences =

Coordinates: 37°13′52″N 80°25′20″W

Virginia Tech – Wake Forest University School of Biomedical Engineering & Sciences
- Type: Public Biomedical Engineering and Sciences School
- Established: 2003
- Parent institution: Virginia Tech and Wake Forest University
- Head: Miguel Perez (Head, VT) and Joel Stitzel (Assoc Head, WFU)
- Location: Blacksburg, Virginia and Winston-Salem, North Carolina, United States
- Website: beam.vt.edu/graduate/biomedical.html

The Virginia Tech – Wake Forest University School of Biomedical Engineering & Sciences is a Biomedical Engineering and Sciences School affiliated with Virginia Tech and Wake Forest University. In 2003, the School of Biomedical Engineering & Sciences was established as a joint partnership. The school offers Masters and Doctorate degrees in biomedical engineering as well as a joint DVM-PhD degree in collaboration with the Virginia–Maryland College of Veterinary Medicine.

== Future growth ==
Both universities are growing and expected to increase their volume of biomedical research. Recently, the school has taken ownership of three new research facilities over the past year for a total of over 80,000 square feet of dedicated biomedical engineering research and teaching space at both Virginia Tech and Wake Forest University.

== Faculty and research ==
Currently the school has 76 tenure track faculty (25 primary and 51 joint) as well as an additional 68 affiliate faculty appointments in the biomedical program. The school has a growth plan that has added 45 faculty in the past 3 years. Over the past academic year, the biomedical engineering faculty have published 200 journal papers and an additional 200 conference papers.
