= Organ printing =

Method of creating artificial organs

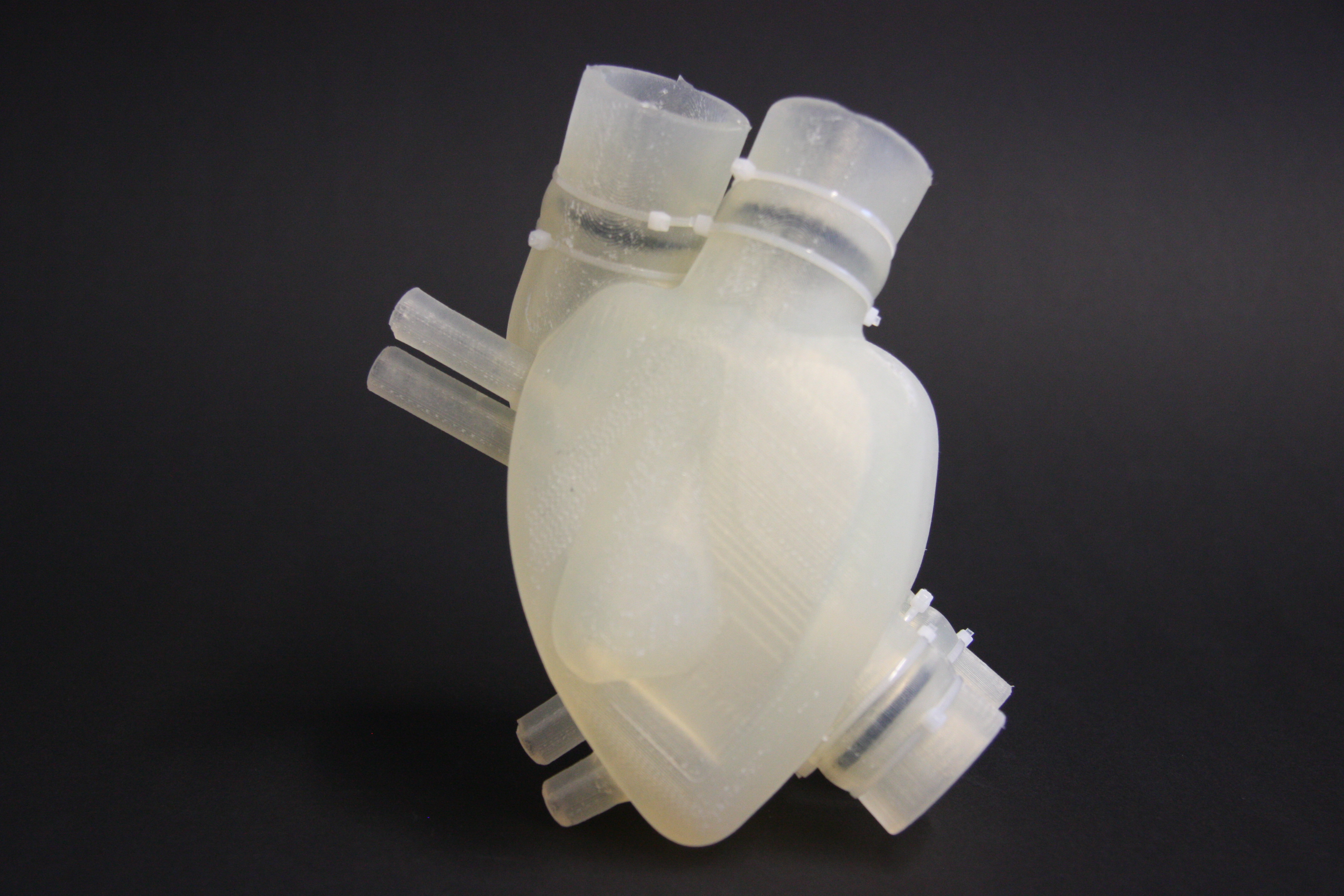
Total artificial heart developed at ETH Zurich

Organ printing utilizes techniques similar to conventional 3D printing where a computer model is fed into a printer that lays down successive layers of plastics or wax until a 3D object is produced. In the case of organ printing, the material being used by the printer is a biocompatible plastic. The biocompatible plastic forms a scaffold that acts as the skeleton for the organ that is being printed. As the plastic is being laid down, it is also seeded with human cells from the patient's organ that is being printed for. After printing, the organ is transferred to an incubation chamber to give the cells time to grow. After a sufficient amount of time, the organ is implanted into the patient.

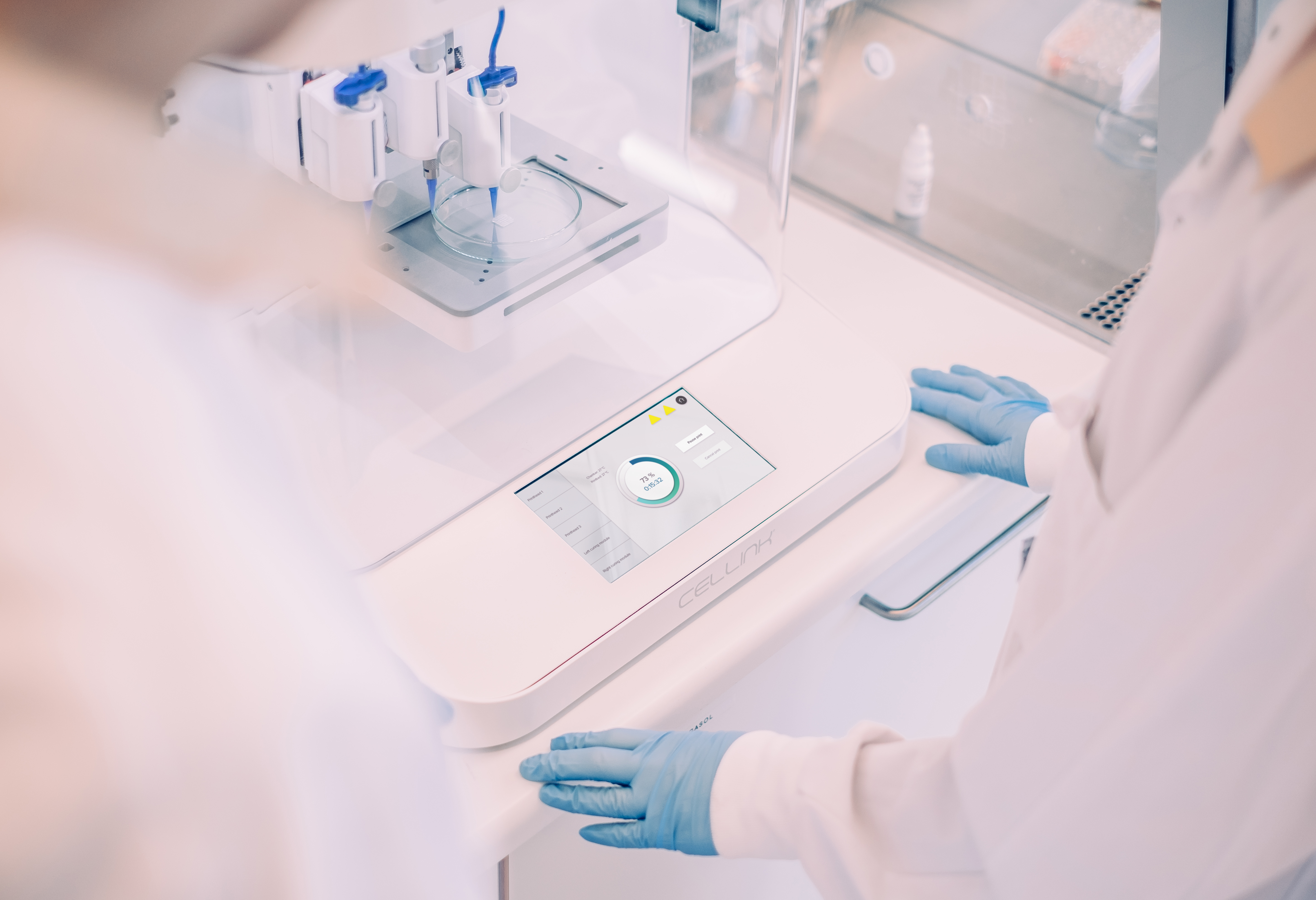
A CELLINK 3D Bioprinter

To many researchers the ultimate goal of organ printing is to create organs that can be fully integrated into the human body. Successful organ printing has the potential to impact several industries, notably artificial organs organ transplants, pharmaceutical research, and the training of physicians and surgeons.

== History ==
The field of organ printing stemmed from research in the area of stereolithography, the basis for the practice of 3D printing that was invented in 1984. In this early era of 3D printing, it was not possible to create lasting objects because of the material used for the printing process was not durable. 3D printing was instead used as a way to model potential end products that would eventually be made from different materials under more traditional techniques. In the beginning of the 1990s, nanocomposites were developed that allowed 3D printed objects to be more durable, permitting 3D printed objects to be used for more than just models. It was around this time that those in the medical field began considering 3D printing as an avenue for generating artificial organs. By the late 1990s, medical researchers were searching for biocompatible materials that could be used in 3D printing.

The concept of bioprinting was first demonstrated in 1988. At this time, a researcher used a modified HP inkjet printer to deposit cells using cytoscribing technology. Progress continued in 1999 when the first artificial organ made using bioprinting was printed by a team of scientist leads by Dr. Anthony Atala at the Wake Forest Institute for Regenerative Medicine. The scientists at Wake Forest printed an artificial scaffold for a human bladder and then seeded the scaffold with cells from their patient. Using this method, they were able to grow a functioning organ and ten years after implantation the patient had no serious complications.

After the bladder at Wake Forest, strides were taken towards printing other organs. In 2002, a miniature, fully functional kidney was printed. In 2003, Dr. Thomas Boland from Clemson University patented the use of inkjet printing for cells. This process utilized a modified spotting system for the deposition of cells into organized 3D matrices placed on a substrate. This printer allowed for extensive research into bioprinting and suitable biomaterials. For instance, since these initial findings, the 3D printing of biological structures has been further developed to encompass the production of tissue and organ structures, as opposed to cell matrices. Additionally, more techniques for printing, such as extrusion bioprinting, have been researched and subsequently introduced as a means of production.

In 2004, the field of bioprinting was drastically changed by yet another new bioprinter. This new printer was able to use live human cells without having to build an artificial scaffold first. In 2009, Organovo used this novel technology to create the first commercially available bioprinter. Soon after, Organovo's bioprinter was used to develop a biodegradable blood vessel, the first of its kind, without a cell scaffold.

In the 2010s and beyond, further research has been put forth into producing other organs, such as the liver and heart valves, and tissues, such as a blood-borne network, via 3D printing. In 2019, scientists in Israel made a major breakthrough when they were able to print a rabbit-sized heart with a network of blood vessels that were capable of contracting like natural blood vessels. The printed heart had the correct anatomical structure and function compared to real hearts. This breakthrough represented a real possibility of printing fully functioning human organs. In fact, scientists at the Warsaw Foundation for Research and Development of Science in Poland have been working on creating a fully artificial pancreas using bioprinting technology. As of today, these scientists have been able to develop a functioning prototype. This is a growing field and much research is still being conducted.

== 3D printing techniques ==
3D printing for the manufacturing of artificial organs has been a major topic of study in biological engineering. As the rapid manufacturing techniques entailed by 3D printing become increasingly efficient, their applicability in artificial organ synthesis has grown more evident. Some of the primary benefits of 3D printing lie in its capability of mass-producing scaffold structures, as well as the high degree of anatomical precision in scaffold products. This allows for the creation of constructs that more effectively resemble the microstructure of a natural organ or tissue structure. Organ printing using 3D printing can be conducted using a variety of techniques, each of which confers specific advantages that can be suited to particular types of organ production.

=== Sacrificial writing into functional tissue (SWIFT) ===
Sacrificial writing into function tissue (SWIFT) is a method of organ printing where living cells are packed tightly to mimic the density that occurs in the human body. While packing, tunnels are carved to mimic blood vessels and oxygen and essential nutrients are delivered via these tunnels. This technique pieces together other methods that only packed cells or created vasculature. SWIFT combines both and is an improvement that brings researchers closer to creating functional artificial organs.

=== Stereolithographic (SLA) 3D bioprinting ===
This method of organ printing uses spatially controlled light or laser to create a 2D pattern that is layered through a selective photopolymerization in the bio-ink reservoir. A 3D structure can then be built in layers using the 2D pattern. Afterwards the bio-ink is removed from the final product. SLA bioprinting allows for the creation of complex shapes and internal structures. The feature resolution for this method is extremely high and the only disadvantage is the scarcity of resins that are biocompatible.

=== Drop-based bioprinting (Inkjet) ===
Drop-based bioprinting makes cellular developments utilizing droplets of an assigned material, which has oftentimes been combined with a cell line. Cells themselves can also be deposited in this manner with or without polymer. When printing polymer scaffolds using these methods, each drop starts to polymerize upon contact with the substrate surface and merge into a larger structure as droplets start to coalesce. Polymerization can happen through a variety of methods depending on the polymer used. For instance, alginate polymerization is started by calcium ions in the substrate, which diffuse into the liquified bioink and permit for the arrangement of a strong gel. Drop-based bioprinting is commonly utilized due to its productive speed. However, this may make it less appropriate for more complicated organ structures.

=== Extrusion bioprinting ===
Extrusion bioprinting includes the consistent statement of a specific printing fabric and cell line from an extruder, a sort of portable print head. This tends to be a more controlled and gentler handle for fabric or cell statement, and permits for more noteworthy cell densities to be utilized within the development of 3D tissue or organ structures. In any case, such benefits are set back by the slower printing speeds involved by this procedure. Extrusion bioprinting is coupled with UV light, which photopolymerizes the printed fabric to create a more steady, coordinated construct.

=== Fused deposition modeling ===
Fused deposition modeling (FDM) is more common and inexpensive compared to selective laser sintering. This printer uses a printhead that is similar in structure to an inkjet printer; however, ink is not used. Plastic beads are heated at high temperature and released from the printhead as it moves, building the object in thin layers. A variety of plastics can be used with FDM printers. Additionally, most of the parts printed by FDM are typically composed from the same thermoplastics that are utilized in tradition injection molding or machining techniques. Due to this, these parts have analogous durability, mechanical properties, and stability characteristics. Precision control allows for a consistent release amount and specific location deposition for each layer contributing to the shape. As the heated plastic is deposited from the printhead, it fuses or bonds to the layers below. As each layer cools, they harden and gradually take hold of the solid shape intended to be created as more layers are contributed to the structure.

=== Selective laser sintering ===
Selective laser sintering (SLS) uses powdered material as the substrate for printing new objects. SLS can be used to create metal, plastic, and ceramic objects. This technique uses a laser controlled by a computer as the power source to sinter powdered material. The laser traces a cross-section of the shape of the desired object in the powder, which fuses it together into a solid form. A new layer of powder is then laid down and the process repeats itself, building each layer with every new application of powder, one by one, to form the entirety of the object. One of the advantages of SLS printing is that it requires very little additional tooling, i.e. sanding, once the object is printed. Recent advances in organ printing using SLS include 3D constructs of craniofacial implants as well as scaffolds for cardiac tissue engineering.

== Printing materials ==
Printing materials must fit a broad spectrum of criteria, one of the foremost being biocompatibility. The resulting scaffolds formed by 3D printed materials should be physically and chemically appropriate for cell proliferation. Biodegradability is another important factor, and insures that the artificially formed structure can be broken down upon successful transplantation, to be replaced by a completely natural cellular structure. Due to the nature of 3D printing, materials used must be customizable and adaptable, being suited to wide array of cell types and structural conformations.

=== Natural polymers ===
Materials for 3D printing usually consist of alginate or fibrin polymers that have been integrated with cellular adhesion molecules, which support the physical attachment of cells. Such polymers are specifically designed to maintain structural stability and be receptive to cellular integration. The term bio-ink has been used as a broad classification of materials that are compatible with 3D bioprinting. Hydrogel alginates have emerged as one of the most commonly used materials in organ printing research, as they are highly customizable, and can be fine-tuned to simulate certain mechanical and biological properties characteristic of natural tissue. The ability of hydrogels to be tailored to specific needs allows them to be used as an adaptable scaffold material, that are suited for a variety of tissue or organ structures and physiological conditions. A major challenge in the use of alginate is its stability and slow degradation, which makes it difficult for the artificial gel scaffolding to be broken down and replaced with the implanted cells' own extracellular matrix. Alginate hydrogel that is suitable for extrusion printing is also often less structurally and mechanically sound; however, this issue can be mediated by the incorporation of other biopolymers, such as nanocellulose, to provide greater stability. The properties of the alginate or mixed-polymer bioink are tunable and can be altered for different applications and types of organs.

Other natural polymers that have been used for tissue and 3D organ printing include chitosan, hydroxyapatite (HA), collagen, and gelatin. Gelatin is a thermosensitive polymer with properties exhibiting excellent wear solubility, biodegradability, biocompatibility, as well as a low immunologic rejection. These qualities are advantageous and result in high acceptance of the 3D bioprinted organ when implanted in vivo.

=== Synthetic polymers ===
Synthetic polymers are human made through chemical reactions of monomers. Their mechanical properties are favorable in that their molecular weights can be regulated from low to high based on differing requirements. However, their lack of functional groups and structural complexity has limited their usage in organ printing. Current synthetic polymers with excellent 3D printability and in vivo tissue compatibility, include polyethylene glycol (PEG), poly(lactic-glycolic acid) (PLGA), and polyurethane (PU). PEG is a biocompatible, nonimmunogenic synthetic polyether that has tunable mechanical properties for use in 3D bioprinting. Though PEG has been utilized in various 3D printing applications, the lack of cell-adhesive domains has limited further use in organ printing. PLGA, a synthetic copolymer, is widely familiar in living creatures, such as animals, humans, plants, and microorganisms. PLGA is used in conjunction with other polymers to create different material systems, including PLGA-gelatin, PLGA-collagen, all of which enhance mechanical properties of the material, biocompatible when placed in vivo, and have tunable biodegradability. PLGA has most often been used in printed constructs for bone, liver, and other large organ regeneration efforts. Lastly, PU is unique in that it can be classified into two groups: biodegradable or non-biodegradable. It has been used in the field of bioprinting due to its excellent mechanical and bioinert properties. An application of PU would be inanimate artificial hearts; however, using existing 3D bioprinters, this polymer cannot be printed. A new elastomeric PU was created composed of PEG and polycaprolactone (PCL) monomers. This new material exhibits excellent biocompatibility, biodegradability, bioprintability, and biostability for use in complex bioartificial organ printing and manufacturing. Due to high vascular and neural network construction, this material can be applied to organ printing in a variety of complex ways, such as the brain, heart, lung, and kidney.

=== Natural-synthetic hybrid polymers ===
Natural-synthetic hybrid polymers are based on the synergic effect between synthetic and biopolymeric constituents. Gelatin methacryloyl (GelMA) has become a popular biomaterial in the field of bioprinting. GelMA has shown it has viable potential as a bioink material due to its suitable biocompatibility and readily tunable psychochemical properties. Hyaluronic acid (HA)-PEG is another natural-synthetic hybrid polymer that has proven to be very successful in bioprinting applications. HA combined with synthetic polymers aid in obtaining more stable structures with high cell viability and limited loss in mechanical properties after printing. A recent application of HA-PEG in bioprinting is the creation of artificial liver. Lastly, a series of biodegradable polyurethane (PU)-gelatin hybrid polymers with tunable mechanical properties and efficient degradation rates have been implemented in organ printing. This hybrid has the ability to print complicated structures such as a nose-shaped construct.

All of the polymers described above have the potential to be manufactured into implantable, bioartificial organs for purposes including, but not limited to, customized organ restoration, drug screening, as well as metabolic model analysis.

=== Cell sources ===
The creation of a complete organ often requires incorporation of a variety of different cell types, arranged in distinct and patterned ways. One advantage of 3D-printed organs, compared to traditional transplants, is the potential to use cells derived from the patient to make the new organ. This significantly decreases the likelihood of transplant rejection, and may remove the need for immunosuppressive drugs after transplant, which would reduce the health risks of transplants. However, since it may not always be possible to collect all the needed cell types, it may be necessary to collect adult stem cells or induce pluripotency in collected tissue. This involves resource-intensive cell growth and differentiation and comes with its own set of potential health risks, since cell proliferation in a printed organ occurs outside the body and requires external application of growth factors. However, the ability of some tissues to self-organize into differentiated structures may provide a way to simultaneously construct the tissues and form distinct cell populations, improving the efficacy and functionality of organ printing.

== Types of printers and processes ==
The types of printers used for organ printing include:

- Inkjet printer
- Multi-nozzle
- Hybrid printer
- Electrospinning
- Drop-on-demand

These printers are used in the methods described previously. Each printer requires different materials and has its own advantages and limitations.

== Applications ==
=== Organ donation ===
Currently, the sole method for treatment for those in organ failure is to await a transplant from a living or recently deceased donor. In the United States alone, there are over 100,000 patients on the organ transplant list waiting for donor organs to become available. Patients on the donor list can wait days, weeks, months, or even years for a suitable organ to become available. The average wait time for some common organ transplants are as follows: four months for a heart or lung, eleven months for a liver, two years for a pancreas, and five years for a kidney. This is a significant increase from the 1990s, when a patient could wait as little as five weeks for a heart. These extensive wait times are due to a shortage of organs as well as the requirement for finding an organ that is suitable for the recipient. An organ is deemed suitable for a patient based on blood type, comparable body size between donor and recipient, the severity of the patient's medical condition, the length of time the patient has been waiting for an organ, patient availability (i.e. ability to contact patient, if patient has an infection), the proximity of the patient to the donor, and the viability time of the donor organ. In the United States, 20 people die everyday waiting for organs. 3D organ printing has the potential to remove both these issues; if organs could be printed as soon as there is need, there would be no shortage. Additionally, seeding printed organs with a patient's own cells would eliminate the need to screen donor organs for compatibility.

=== Physician and surgical training ===
Surgical usage of 3D printing has evolved from printing surgical instrumentation to the development of patient-specific technologies for total joint replacements, dental implants, and hearing aids. In the field of organ printing, applications can be applied for patients and surgeons. For instance, printed organs have been used to model structure and injury to better understand the anatomy and discuss a treatment regime with patients. For these cases, the functionality of the organ is not required and is used for proof-of-concept. These model organs provide advancement for improving surgical techniques, training inexperienced surgeons, and moving towards patient-specific treatments.

=== Pharmaceutical research ===
3D organ printing technology permits the fabrication of high degrees of complexity with great reproducibility, in a fast and cost-effective manner. 3D printing has been used in pharmaceutical research and fabrication, providing a transformative system allowing precise control of droplet size and dose, personalized medicine, and the production of complex drug-release profiles. This technology calls for implantable drug delivery devices, in which the drug is injected into the 3D printed organ and is released once in vivo. Also, organ printing has been used as a transformative tool for in vitro testing. The printed organ can be utilized in discovery and dosage research upon drug-release factors.

=== Organ-on-a-chip ===
Organ printing technology can also be combined with microfluidic technology to develop organs-on-chips. These organs-on-chips have the potential to be used for disease models, aiding in drug discovery, and performing high-throughput assays. Organ-on-chips work by providing a 3D model that imitates the natural extracellular matrix, allowing them to display realistic responses to drugs. Thus far, research has been focused on developing liver-on-a-chip and heart-on-a-chip, but there exists the potential to develop an entire body-on-a-chip model.

By combining 3D printed organs, researchers are able to create a body-on-a-chip. The heart-on-a-chip model has already been used to investigate how several drugs with heart rate-based negative side effects, such as the chemotherapeutic drug doxorubicin could affect people on an individual basis. The new body-on-a-chip platform includes liver, heart, lungs, and kidney-on-a-chip. The organs-on-a-chip are separately printed or constructed and then integrated together. Using this platform drug toxicity studies are performed in high throughput, lowering the cost and increasing the efficiency in the drug-discovery pipeline.

== Legal and safety ==
3D-printing techniques have been used in a variety of industries for the overall goal of fabricating a product. Organ printing, on the other hand, is a novel industry that utilizes biological components to develop therapeutic applications for organ transplants. Due to the increased interest in this field, regulation and ethical considerations desperately need to be established. Specifically, there can be legal complications from pre-clinical to clinical translation for this treatment method.

=== Regulation ===
The current American regulation for organ matching is centered on the national registry of organ donors after the National Organ Transplant Act was passed in 1984. This act was set in place to ensure equal and honest distribution, although it has been proven insufficient due to the large demand for organ transplants. Organ printing can assist in diminishing the imbalance between supply and demand by printing patient-specific organ replacements, all of which are unfeasible without regulation. The Food and Drug Administration (FDA) is responsible for regulation of biologics, devices, and drugs in the United States. Due to the complexity of this therapeutic approach, the location of organ printing on the spectrum has not been discerned. Studies have characterized printed organs as multi-functional combination products, meaning they fall between the biologics and devices sectors of the FDA; this leads to more extensive processes for review and approval. In 2016, the FDA issued draft guidance on the Technical Considerations for Additive Manufactured Devices and is currently evaluating new submissions for 3D printed devices. However, the technology itself is not advanced enough for the FDA to mainstream it directly. Currently, the 3D printers, rather than the finished products, are the main focus in safety and efficacy evaluations in order to standardize the technology for personalized treatment approaches. From a global perspective, only South Korea and Japan's medical device regulation administrations have provided guidelines that are applicable to 3D bio-printing.

There are also concerns with intellectual property and ownership. These can have a large impact on more consequential matters such as piracy, quality control for manufacturing, and unauthorized use on the black market. These considerations are focused more on the materials and fabrication processes; they are more extensively explained in the legal aspects subsection of 3D printing.

=== Ethical considerations ===
From an ethical standpoint, there are concerns with respect to the availability of organ printing technologies, the cell sources, and public expectations. Although this approach may be less expensive than traditional surgical transplantation, there is skepticism in regards to social availability of these 3D printed organs. Contemporary research has found that there is potential social stratification for the wealthier population to have access to this therapy while the general population remains on the organ registry. The cell sources mentioned previously also need to be considered. Organ printing can decrease or eliminate animal studies and trials, but also raises questions on the ethical implications of autologous and allogenic sources. More specifically, studies have begun to examine future risks for humans undergoing experimental testing. Generally, this application can give rise to social, cultural, and religious differences, making it more difficult for worldwide integration and regulation. Overall, the ethical considerations of organ printing are similar to those of general ethics of bioprinting, but are extrapolated from tissue to organ. Altogether, organ printing possesses short- and long-term legal and ethical consequences that need to be considered before mainstream production can be feasible.

== Impact ==
Organ printing for medical applications is still in the developmental stages. Thus, the long term impacts of organ printing have yet to be determined. Researchers hope that organ printing could decrease the organ transplant shortage. There is currently a shortage of available organs, including liver, kidneys, and lungs. The lengthy wait time to receive life saving organs is one of the leading causes of death in the United States, with nearly one third of deaths each year in the United States that could be delayed or prevented with organ transplants. Currently the only organ that has been 3D bioprinted and successfully transplanted into a human is a bladder. The bladder was formed from the host's bladder tissue. Researchers have proposed that a potential positive impact of 3D printed organs is the ability to customize organs for the recipient. Developments enabling an organ recipient's host cells to be used to synthesize organs decreases the risk of organ rejection.

The ability to print organs has decreased the demand for animal testing. Animal testing is used to determine the safety of products ranging from makeup to medical devices. Cosmetic companies are already using smaller tissue models to test new products on skin. The ability to 3D print skin reduces the need for animal trials for makeup testing. In addition, the ability to print models of human organs to test the safety and efficacy of new drugs further reduces the necessity for animal trials. Researchers at Harvard University determined that drug safety can be accurately tested on smaller tissue models of lungs. The company Organovo, which designed one of the initial commercial bioprinters in 2009, has displayed that biodegradable 3D tissue models can be used to research and develop new drugs, including those to treat cancer. An additional impact of organ printing includes the ability to rapidly create tissue models, therefore increasing productivity.

== Challenges ==
One of the challenges of 3D printing organs is to recreate the vasculature required to keep the organs alive. Designing a correct vasculature is necessary for the transport of nutrients, oxygen, and waste. Blood vessels, especially capillaries, are difficult due to the small diameter. Progress has been made in this area at Rice University, where researchers designed a 3D printer to make vessels in biocompatible hydrogels and designed a model of lungs that can oxygenate blood. However, accompanied with this technique is the challenge of replicating the other minute details of organs. It is difficult to replicate the entangled networks of airways, blood vessels, and bile ducts and complex geometry of organs.

The challenges faced in the organ printing field extends beyond the research and development of techniques to solve the issues of multivascularization and difficult geometries. Before organ printing can become widely available, a source for sustainable cell sources must be found and large-scale manufacturing processes need to be developed. Additional challenges include designing clinical trials to test the long-term viability and biocompatibility of synthetic organs. While many developments have been made in the field of organ printing, more research must be conducted.
