= BICO Group =

Biotech company in Gothenburg, Sweden

Bico Group
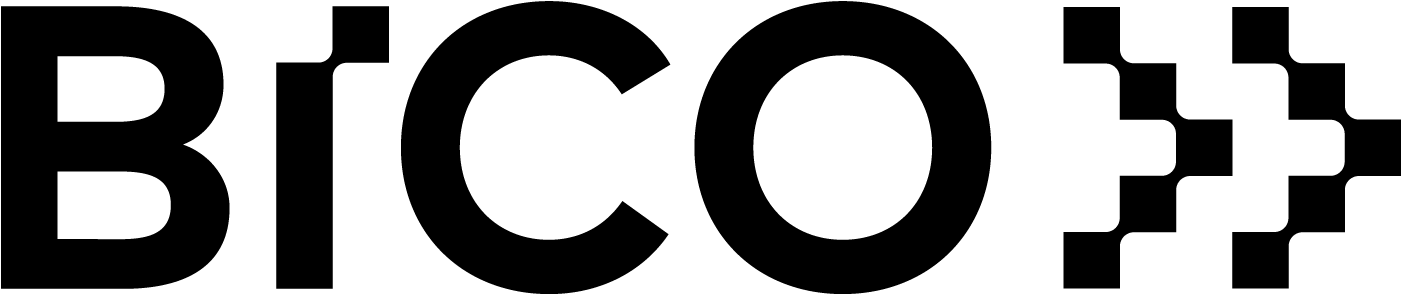
- Company type: Public
- Traded as: Nasdaq Stockholm: BICO
- Industry: Bioprinting; Biotechnology; Medical devices
- Founded: January 27, 2016; 9 years ago in Gothenburg, Sweden
- Founders: Erik Gatenholm; Héctor Martínez; Gusten Danielsson
- Headquarters: Gothenburg, Sweden
- Area served: Worldwide
- Key people: Maria Forss (chief executive); Ali Khademhosseini (advisor); Mina Bissell (advisor); Carl Bennet (advisor)
- Revenue: ▲1.26 billion kr (2021)
- Operating income: ▼ −237 million kr (2021)
- Net income: ▼ −229 million kr (2021)
- Total assets: ▲9.75 billion kr (2021)
- Total equity: ▲6.77 billion kr (2021)
- Number of employees: 1,150+ (2021)
- Website: bico.com

Bico Group (previously Cellink) is a Swedish bioconvergence company that designs and supplies technologies and services to enhance biology research. It focuses on commercializing technologies for life science research as well as bioprinting.

Bico Group (then Cellink) began by producing bio-inks and bioprinters for culturing different cell types to enable applications like patient-derived implants. Bico Group was the first company to provide a standardized bio-ink product for sale over the internet.

The company has ongoing collaborations with organizations including AstraZeneca, MedImmune, MIT and Takara Bio, and its bioprinters are used for research at Harvard University, Merck, Novartis, the U.S. Army, Toyota, Johnson & Johnson and more.

== History ==
=== Foundation ===
Bico Group was founded as Cellink in 2016 by Erik Gatenholm, the company's chief executive, Héctor Martinez, the company's CTO and Gusten Danielsson, the company's CFO. They developed and sold the world's first universally compatible bio-ink to simplify bioprinting for academics and pharmaceutical companies who were, at that time, mixing their own biomaterial in-house. The company released its first bioprinter to test the market in 2015, and continued designing additional bio-inks to support more specialized applications in bioprinting.

Ten months after it was founded, Cellink was listed publicly on the Nasdaq exchange First North. At its IPO, shares were oversubscribed by 1070 percent.

The company's technology made it possible to print tissues such as skin, liver, cornea, and cartilage. This technology allowed printing of fully functional cancer tumors which could be used to develop new cancer treatment.

In 2017, it established a United States headquarters in Boston. In January 2018, Cellink announced a collaboration with Ctibiotech to boost 3D bioprinting technology for cancer research. In 2018, Cellink received a $2.5 million grant from the EU to fund its TumorPrint project.

By 2018, the company's revenue totaled $4.88. As of February 2019, its products were used by more than 600 labs in more than 50 countries.

=== Growth 2021 - Present ===
In August 2021, Cellink underwent a corporate transformation and changed its name to BICO, while keeping the Cellink name for their bioprinting business.

Bico Group acquired German biotechnology company Cytena in August 2019 for a purchase price of $33.8 million.

In 2020, Bico Group acquired Scienion, a precision dispensing company, for $94.8 million, along with its subsidiary Cellenion.

Bico Group transitioned to a bioconvergence company in 2020, expanding its focus from bioprinting to broader life sciences technology and industrial solutions. The company developed and marketed products that enable researchers to culture cells in 3D, perform high-throughput drug screening, and print human tissues and organs for use in medical, pharmaceutical and cosmetic applications.

In May 2021, Bico Group acquired German 3D microfabrication company Nanoscribe for $70.6 million as well as the US-based contract research company Visikol for $7.5 million.

In December 2021, Bico Group acquired the San Diego life-science automaton company Biosero for $165 million.

In August 2023, co-founder Erik Gatenholm stepped down from his position as CEO with Maria Forss appointed as the new CEO.

== Products ==
The bio-ink produced by the company contains cellulose and alginate, locally sourced from trees in Sweden and seaweed from the Norwegian Sea, respectively. Cellink's bio-ink technology was developed at Chalmers University.
