= Microgravity bioprinting =

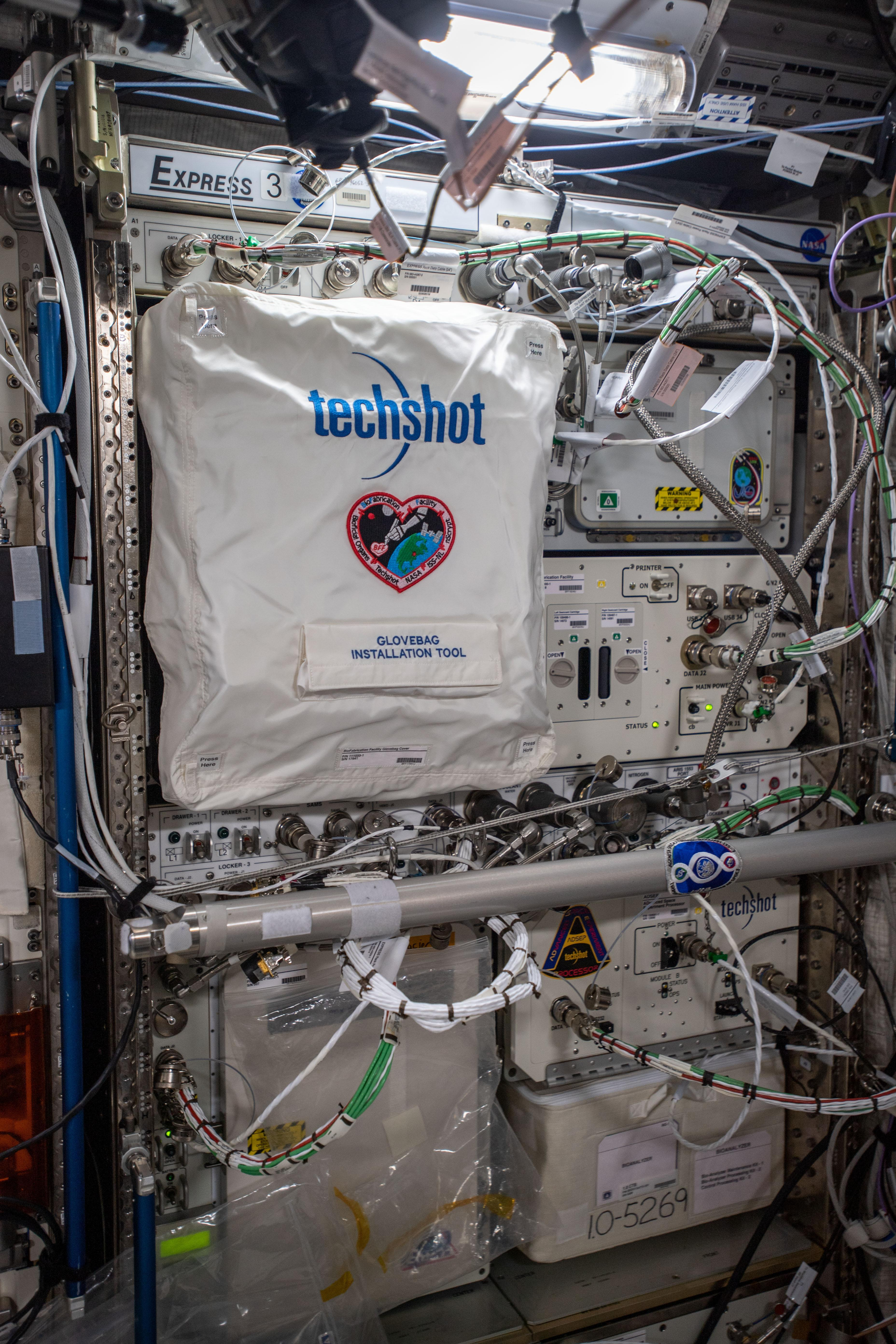
Microgravity bioprinter installed aboard the ISS

Microgravity bioprinting is the utilization of 3D bioprinting techniques under microgravity conditions to fabricate highly complex, functional tissue and organ structures. The zero gravity environment circumvents some of the current limitations of bioprinting on Earth including magnetic field disruption and biostructure retention during the printing process. Microgravity bioprinting is one of the initial steps to advancing in space exploration and colonization while furthering the possibilities of regenerative medicine.

== General principle ==
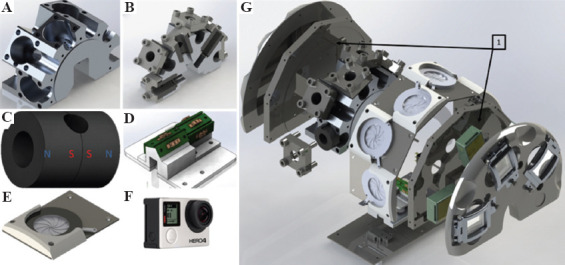
General design of a magnetic levitation based microgravity 3D bioprinter

The main function microgravity bioprinting has over the other 3D bioprinting techniques is the utilization of a zero gravity environment. All other techniques of 3D bioprinting have been tested in space including extrusion-based printing, lithography-based printing, laser-based printing, droplet-based printing, magnetic field-based printing, and magnetic levitation-based printing. The optimal microgravity bioprinting technique is to utilize formative biofabrication, which is a combination of utilizing a magnetic and acoustic levitation field to fabricate tissues and organs. The magnetic and acoustic levitation field creates a zone that acts like a scaffold to provide support for the bioprinting process. Bioinks used in microgravity bioprinting are specifically low viscosity compounds that can contain biomaterials and biological substances. They function similarly to other 3D bioprinting processes but are optimized for zero gravity settings. Limitations of microgravity bioprinting are shared amongst other 3D bioprinting techniques. An added challenge is sending biomaterials and bioinks to space when the supply on board the ISS has been extinguished.

== History ==
=== 2016 ===
An American-based company named Techshot printed the first cardiac and vascular tissue in a microgravity environment using a bioink consisting of adult human stem cells and a nScrypt bioprinter developed specifically for zero gravity use. Techshot began developing a specific microgravity use bioprinter to send to the International Space Station (ISS).

=== 2017 ===
A Skolkovo-based company named 3D Bioprinting Solutions began manufacturing and developing a space specific bioprinter that utilized magnetic levitation technology.

=== 2018 ===
3D Bioprinting Solutions had successfully printed a mouse thyroid aboard the International Space Station (ISS) using their magnetic bioprinter.

=== 2019 ===
The bioprinted mouse thyroid was sent back to Earth in early 2019 for analysis. Biofabrication Facility, a microgravity bioprinter developed and produced by Techshot, was sent and installed onto the ISS. The Facility is designed to gradually print thicker tissues over time and conduct drug reformulation research. 3D Bioprinting Solution's first human cell bioprinting was attempted in late 2019 aboard the ISS. They successfully printed human bone tissue fragments using a magnetic nanoparticle mixture consisting of living human cells and calcium phosphate ceramics.

== Applications ==
=== Soft tissue printing ===
The microgravity environment enables the possibility of printing soft and delicate tissue structures such as the blood vessels. On Earth, the fragility of blood vessels results in the structure collapsing due to the cell weight combined with the force of gravity. Veins and arteries bioprinted in zero gravity do not require structural support and suspend in space during the print process. This allows the delicate tissues to maintain their structure and shape throughout the entire printing process. Before sending the bioprints back to Earth, the tissues are conditioned using cell culturing systems to further strengthen the tissue for self-support. Skipping the cell culturing will result in the soft tissue collapsing under gravitational force and cellular weight due to lack of cell stability. Once the cell culturing process is complete, the printed delicate tissue structures are expected to be functionally no different from their natural counterparts.

=== Complex tissue and organ printing ===
Complex organs can be fabricated solely out of cells and biological matter without the need of any support system. Zero gravity environment solves the mechanical load and structural requirement limitation that is common with 3D bioprinting on Earth. The ISS currently runs multiple microgravity focused bioprinters to print cardiovascular tissues and structures . The bioprinted tissues and structures are used as models for various research involving therapy development to treat heart diseases and repair damaged heart tissue.

=== Biomedical research ===
Biofabricated organs such as livers have been used as in vitro models to test and treat specific liver diseases due to their increased mimicry in physiological conditions. Current liver models are limited to smaller tissue slices due to the increasing complexity of printing a larger liver construct. Microgravity bioprinting can potentially fabricate a larger and more complex liver construct that can function on par with natural livers.

A handheld device called the Bioprint FirstAid Handheld Bioprinter (Bioprint FirstAid) is being developed as a next generation handheld bioprinter that functions in both Earth and space. The bioprinter aims to print a band-aid patch made out of bioinks containing cells of respective patients. The entire printing process takes about 10 minutes and relies purely on mechanical printing through a fed ink cartridge. This research is a start to developing portable and easy-to-use bioprinters that can function under any circumstance.

=== Pharmaceutical research ===
Chemical compounds can be fabricated with uniquely edited surface properties and characteristics in space that cannot be achieved on Earth. Specially made compounds can be tested during research to note their effectiveness compared to compounds found on Earth. Zero gravity environment provides more efficient chemical compound manufacturing processes than regular manufacturing procedures. This effects further optimizations and increased productions of drugs.

== Impact ==
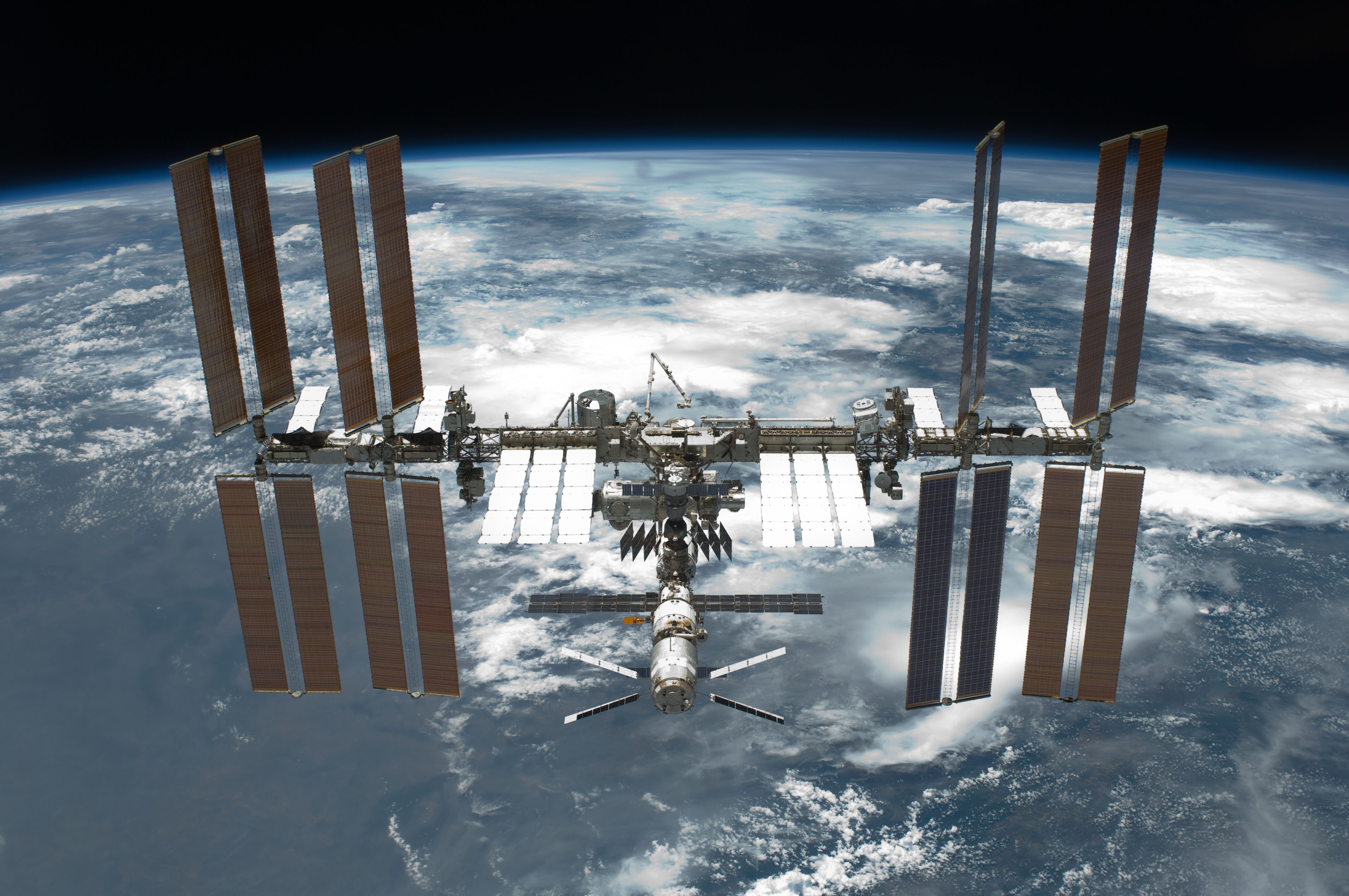
ISS - location for microgravity bioprinting and research.

Microgravity Bioprinting utilizes the advantages of the zero gravity to print organ and tissue structures that are sensitive to gravitational and cellular weight. High viscosity bioinks are frequently used for bioprinting to allow cells to retain and form a 3D structure. The high viscosity counteracts the force of the Earth's gravity but generates a high amount of shear stress. The increasing stress on these high viscosity bioinks during the printing process results in frequent cell death. The microgravity environment enables usage of low viscosity bioinks while still allowing the bioprint to form a fully cell based 3D structure. This removes the necessity of creating a scaffold for support since the cells are printed in a suspended state. As microgravity bioprinting improves and evolves, the possibility of printing artificial organs presents an opportunity to further space exploration and colonization. Regenerative medicine is expected to improve drastically as Earth based biofabrication techniques become more refined based on the improvements and breakthrough from microgravity bioprinting.

== See also ==
- 3D bioprinting
- 3D printing
- Magnetic 3D bioprinting
- Micro-g environment
- Bio-ink
- Space exploration
- Regenerative medicine
