= Tengion =

US healthcare company

Tengion, Inc.
- Company type: Public
- Traded as: Expert Market: TNGNQ
- Industry: Biotechnology
- Founded: 2003
- Headquarters: Winston-Salem, North Carolina, United States
- Key people: David I. Scheer (Chairman); John L. Miclot (Chief Executive Officer)
- Number of employees: 25
- Website: www.tengion.com

Tengion, Inc. is an US development-stage regenerative medicine company founded in 2003 with financing from J&J Development Corporation, HealthCap and Oak Investment Partners, which is headquartered in Winston-Salem, North Carolina. Its goals are discovering, developing, manufacturing and commercializing a range of replacement organs and tissues, or neo-organs and neo-tissues, to address unmet medical needs in urologic, renal, gastrointestinal, and vascular diseases and disorders. The company creates these human neo-organs from a patient’s own cells or autologous cells, in conjunction with its Organ Regeneration Platform.

Tengion declared Chapter 7 bankruptcy in December 2014, and liquidated its assets. In March 2015 its assets, including tissue engineering samples, were bought back by its creditors and former executives in March 2015. The purchase was expedited. The new owners then formed Winston-Salem based RegenMedTX.

== History ==
Founded in 2003 and formerly headquartered in East Norriton Township, Pennsylvania before moving to Winston-Salem, North Carolina in 2012, Tengion went public in 2010, after its stock has been approved for listing on the NASDAQ, through a $26 million IPO to help advance its research and development activities. Some of the groundbreaking regenerative medicine technologies of Dr. Anthony Atala, director of the Wake Forest Institute for Regenerative Medicine, were the core from where those research and development activities developed.

On September 4, 2012, Tengion received a notice from NASDAQ stating that the company had not regained compliance with NASDAQ Listing Rule 5550(b)(1) and that its common stock would cease trading on the NASDAQ Capital Market effective on September 6, 2012, and would begin trading on the OTCQB tier of the OTC Marketplace. The company was bought by former executives and creditors after declaring bankruptcy in 2014.

== Products ==
All current Tengion's regenerative medicine product candidates are investigational and will not be commercially available until the completion of clinical trials and the review and approval of associated marketing applications by the Food and Drug Administration.

=== Product candidates in clinical development ===
Its most advanced candidate is the Neo-Urinary Conduit. A Phase I clinical trial of the Tengion Neo-Urinary Conduit was completed in some health care institutions, in patients with bladder cancer who require a total cystectomy. The trial ended in December 2014, however information on the results has not yet been made publicly available.
