= Linxia Gu =

Chinese-American bioengineer

Linxia Gu is a biomechanical engineer, and a professor and head of the Department of Biomedical Engineering and Science at the Florida Institute of Technology. Her research interests focus on biomechanics and biomaterials, including 3D bioprinting, and bio-ink; Her major projects are head trauma, the optimization of stenting procedure, and the crashworthiness of vehicle design.

== Education and career ==
Gu grew up in Henan. She was an undergraduate at Xi'an Jiaotong University, and earned a master's degree at the Dalian University of Technology, both in China. She completed a Ph.D. at the University of Florida in 2004.

She became an assistant professor at the South Dakota School of Mines and Technology in 2006. She moved to the University of Nebraska–Lincoln in 2009, as an assistant professor in mechanical engineering. She became the university's first hire in its ADVANCE program. After becoming an associate professor and full professor at the University of Nebraska, she moved to her present position at Florida Tech in 2019.

== Recognition ==
Gu was named as an ASME Fellow in 2016.
