= Biofabrication (journal) =

Scientific journal on biofabrication

- Discipline: Biomaterials, Biofabrication
- Language: English
- Edited by: Wei Sun

Publication details
- History: 2009-present
- Publisher: IOP Publishing (United Kingdom)
- Frequency: Quarterly
- Open access: Hybrid
- Impact factor: 8.2 (2025)

Standard abbreviations
- ISO 4: Biofabrication

Indexing
- CODEN: BIOFCK
- ISSN: 1758-5082 (print); 1758-5090 (web)
- LCCN: 2010243394
- OCLC no.: 316801915

Links
- Journal homepage

Biofabrication is a peer-reviewed scientific journal and the official journal of the International Society for Biofabrication (ISBF) that publishes research on the fabrication of advanced biological systems, including engineered tissues, medical therapeutic products, and non-medical biological constructs. The editor-in-chief is Wei Sun (Drexel University and Tsinghua University).

The journal focuses on the use of cells, proteins, and biomaterials as building blocks for biofabrication, emphasizing fabrication technologies, modeling of biofabricated constructs and processes, and the maturation and functional integration of engineered biological systems for applications such as tissue and organ engineering, disease and drug-screening models, and biointegrated devices.

== Abstracting and indexing ==
The journal is abstracted and indexed in:

- Science Citation Index
- Biotechnology Citation Index
- Biological Abstracts
- BIOSIS Previews
- PubMed/MEDLINE
- Inspec
- Compendex
- Chemical Abstracts Service
- INIS Atomindex
- NASA Astrophysics Data System
- Scopus

According to the Journal Citation Reports, the journal has a 2025 impact factor of 8.2.

== See also ==
- Additive Manufacturing
- Biofabrication
- Bioengineering
- Organ-on-a-chip
- Animal disease model
- Biological material
- 3D bioprinting
