= Biological (disambiguation) =

Biological is the adjectival form of "biology", the study of life.

Biological may also refer to:

- Biological agent, an infectious disease or toxin that can be used in bioterrorism or biological warfare
- Biological process
- Biological relationship, a measure of the degree of consanguinity

== See also ==
- Biologic (disambiguation)
- Biological material (disambiguation)
- Biological warfare
- Biopharmaceutical, a drug that is synthesized from living organisms or their products and used as a medical treatment
- Organic (disambiguation)
