= Boris Chichkov =

German physicist researching light matter interaction

- Борис Николаевич Чичков
- Born: 1955 (age 70–71); Novokuznetsk

Academic background
- Education: Moscow Institute of Physics and Technology

Academic work
- Discipline: physics
- Institutions: P.N. Lebedev Institute of Physics; Max-Planck-Institut für Quantenoptik, Garching; Friedrich-Schiller-Universität; Leibniz Universität Hannover
- Main interests: novel laser technologies
- Website: www.iqo.uni-hannover.de/de/chichkov/

Boris Nikolaevich Chichkov (Борис Николаевич Чичков), born 1955 in Novokuznetsk is a German-Russian physicist whose research focus is on the development of novel laser technologies and their applications in material processing, photonics, and biomedicine.

== Early life and education ==
From 1972 to 1978 Chichkov studied physics at the Moscow Institute of Physics and Technology (MIPT). After this he became post-graduate student from 1978 to 1981 at the MIPT and P.N. Lebedev Institute of Physics in Moscow, completing a Ph.D. in physics from the former in 1981.

== Career ==
Chichkov started his scientific career in laser physics at the P.N. Lebedev Institute of Physics in Moscow, where he worked from 1981 to 1995 as scientific researcher. From 1988 to 1990 he became Alexander von Humboldt Fellow at the Max-Planck-Institut für Quantenoptik, Garching and stayed from 1992 to 1993 as Fellow of the Japan Society for the Promotion of Science at the Institute of Laser Engineering, Osaka University, Japan. After a visit as research scientist at the Technical University Darmstadt and Max-Planck-Institut für Biopysikalische Chemie, Göttingen from 1993 to 1994 he moved 1994 as a visiting research scientist to the Institut für Quantenoptik, Leibniz Universität Hannover.

From 1995 to 1997 he became scientific researcher at the Laser Zentrum Hannover e.V. and did his Habilitation in physics at the Leibniz Universität Hannover in 1997.

From 1997 to 2000 Chichkov worked as guest professor at the Institut für Quantenoptik, Leibniz Universität Hannover and from 2000 to 2001 as Senior Scientific Researcher at the Institut für Angewandte Physik, Friedrich-Schiller-Universität, Jena. He was head of the strategy group at Laser Zentrum Hannover e.V. from 2001 to 2004, and subsequently headed the nanotechnology department from 2004 to 2017.

Since 2009 he is professor of physics at the Leibniz Universität Hannover.

== Research ==
Chichkov's scientific interests include laser physics and laser applications, nonlinear optics, nano- and biophotonics, nanotechnology, biomedical implants and devices, biofabrication, tissue engineering, and regenerative medicine.

Together with his collaborators, he has investigated femtosecond laser material processing, three-dimensional additive laser nanomanufacturing by two-photon polymerization technique, laser generation and laser printing of single nanoparticles, and laser printing of living cells and tissues.
