= Erik Gatenholm =

Swedish-American entrepreneur

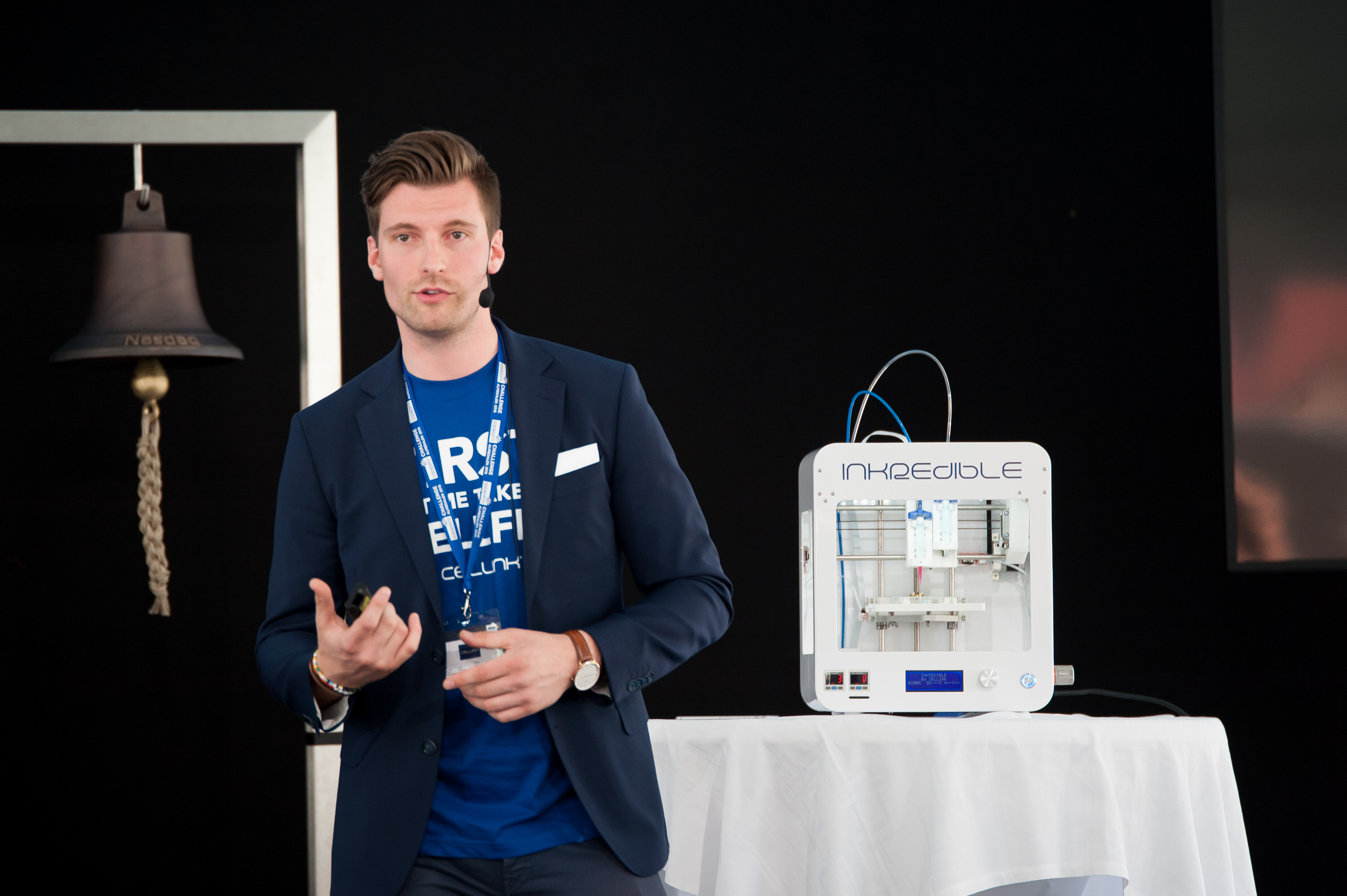
- Born: August 23, 1989 (age 37)
- Education: Virginia Tech; University of Gothenburg
- Occupation: Entrepreneur
- Known for: Co-founder of Cellink
- Website: www.bico.com

Erik Gatenholm is a Swedish-American entrepreneur. He is credited with marketing the world's first universal bio-ink.

== Biography ==
Gatenholm was raised mostly in Blacksburg, Virginia. He attended Blacksburg High School and studied Business Management at Virginia Tech. He attended the Innovation and Industrial Management Master's program at the Gothenburg School of Business, Economics and Law, and received his Master's of Science in June 2016.

Erik is married to Gabriella Gatenholm, the couple have two kids.

== Early work ==
At age 18, Gatenholm started his first venture as a freshman at Virginia Tech. BC Genesis focused on developing surgical meshes for hernia repair and cartilage implants by commercializing Virginia Tech-owned intellectual property. Within three years of its founding, BC Genesis received two National Science Foundation grants for $600,000. The company also received a $700,000 grant from the Virginia Tobacco Indemnification and Community Revitalization Commission, and was slated to help revive Floyd County's economy through the introduction of more job opportunities in biotech.

Gatenholm has had his own research published in line with his work. His abstract titled "Innovative bacterial nanocellulose medical devices: From incubator to human body" was published in 2013.

Outside of the biotechnology sector, Gatenholm has also worked in music production. In 2014, Gatenholm wrote and produced "Finally" with vocalist Jalana. Gatenholm composed the track and played guitar for the recording, while Jalana contributed lyrics and vocals. The track was remixed several times, earning success across the electronic music scene and gaining radio airplay, chart positions and DJ support. Gatenholm was signed along with Jalana to Déepalma Records in 2015.

== Current work ==
Gatenholm was introduced to 3D bioprinting in 2014. At that time, academics and pharmaceutical companies mixed their own bio-inks in-house, and Gatenholm recognized a gap in the market. He co-founded CELLINK in 2016 when he was 25 years old. CELLINK was listed on Nasdaq First North within ten months of its founding, and sales totaled $1 million in its first year.

Gatenholm, along with co-founder Hector Martinez, stepped down from the company in 2024 following the conclusion of external whistleblower investigation "where the company's aggressive sales culture during the years 2017-2021 was highlighted."

== Awards ==
- West Sweden's Young Entrepreneur of the Year, 2016.
- Sweden's Young Entrepreneur of the Year, 2016.
- Danske Bank's Innovator of the Year, 2016.
- Swedbank's Future Award, 2016.
- Anders Wall Award for Exceptional Entrepreneurship, 2017.
- Forbes 30 Under 30, 2018.
- Företagarna's Årets Företagare (Entrepreneurs of the Year), 2019.
- MIT Technology Review magazine's Innovators Under 35 list of 2019.
- Svenska Dagbladet's Affärsbragd (The Business Achievement) 2020
