= Ali Khademhosseini =

Iranian-Canadian-American bioengineer

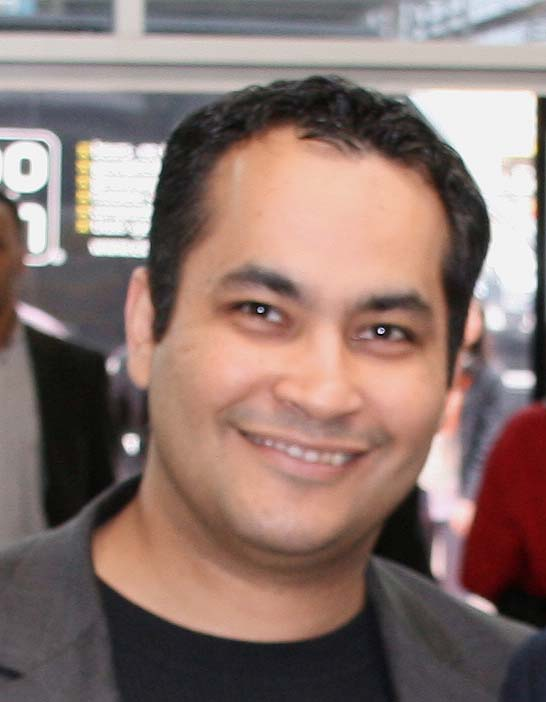
- Khademhosseini in 2022
- Born: October 30, 1975 (age 51); Tehran, Iran
- Education: University of Toronto (BSc, MASc); Massachusetts Institute of Technology (PhD)
- Awards: Mustafa Prize, PECASE
- Scientific career
- Fields: Biomedical Engineering; Biomaterials; Tissue Engineering
- Workplaces: Terasaki Institute; Amazon; University of California, Los Angeles; Wyss Institute for Biologically Inspired Engineering; Harvard University
- Doctoral advisor: Robert S. Langer
- Other academic advisors: Peter Zandstra

Ali Khademhosseini (Persian: علی خادم‌حسینی, born October 30, 1975) is an Iranian-born Canadian-American engineer and entrepreneur. He is currently the co-founder and CEO of a stealth startup in the area of AI and science.

Khademhosseini was the CEO of the Terasaki Institute for Biomedical Innovation (TIBI) in Los Angeles, California. Before that he held a multi-departmental professorship at the University of California, Los Angeles (UCLA), where he served as the Levi Knight Chair in Engineering and a professor in the departments of Bioengineering, Radiology, and Chemical and Biomolecular Engineering. He also served as the director of the Center for Minimally Invasive Therapeutics (C-MIT) at UCLA. He was principal scientist at Amazon during his transition between UCLA to TIBI.

Prior to joining UCLA, he was a faculty member at Harvard Medical School and a core faculty member at the Wyss Institute for Biologically Inspired Engineering from 2005 to 2017.

== Early life and education ==
Khademhosseini was born in Tehran, Iran. His family migrated to Canada in 1987 and he grew up in Toronto, Canada. He received his Ph.D. in bioengineering from Massachusetts Institute of Technology under the supervision of Robert S. Langer (2005), and MASc (2001) and BSc (1999) degrees from the University of Toronto both in chemical engineering. He was first introduced to bioengineering by working as an undergraduate researcher in the laboratory of Michael Sefton who is a professor at University of Toronto. For his masters he worked with Peter Zandstra and Sefton on stem cell bioengineering.

== Academic career ==
Throughout his academic career, Khademhosseini has published approximately 1,000 scientific articles, with over 170,000 citations giving him an h-index of 214 as of November 2026. His research spans biomaterials, tissue engineering, microfluidics, and biofabrication, with major contributions to gelatin methacryloyl (GelMA) hydrogels and organ-on-a-chip technologies. His work advanced the use of GelMA-based biomaterials in tissue engineering and clinical applications, including surgical sealants and hemostatic agents. His group also developed conductive and tunable GelMA hydrogels incorporating nanomaterials such as gold nanoparticles and carbon-based compounds.

His research has also contributed to multi-organ-on-a-chip platforms with integrated sensors for real-time monitoring, with potential applications in drug testing and disease modeling. Other innovations include electrochemical and microfluidic biosensors, smart wound-healing patches, and hydrogel-based surgical adhesives and tissue sealants.

Among these developments is a shear-thinning embolic agent combining Laponite and gelatin for vascular applications such as aneurysm treatment. The material adapts to blood-vessel geometry during injection and led to the commercial development of the Obsidio embolic material.

In 2024 about 90 of his papers were flagged for potential issues when analyzed using AI tools. This led to more than 40 papers being corrected and two retractions from papers from collaborating labs, which he co-authored. A separate paper, also from a collaborating lab, was retracted in 2015. An institutional investigation found no research misconduct by him.

== Translational efforts ==
In addition to his academic career, Khademhosseini is also active in technology translation and entrepreneurship. He has contributed to the development of commercial products in the biomedical space, including surgical sealants, wearable sensors, and embolic materials.

He co-founded Obsidio Medical to use a hydrogel made out of silicate nanoparticles with gelatin to engineer shear-thinning materials for the embolization of blood vessels in the peripheral vasculature. The technology was approved by U.S. Food and Drug Administration, and Obsidio Medical was acquired by Boston Scientific in August 2022.

He also founded Omeat Inc., aiming to produce cultivated meat in a scalable and affordable manner. Omeat is a vertically integrated meat company that also produces humane and cost effective fetal bovine serum replacement. In 2024 Jim Miller, the CTO at that time, took over as CEO, after Khademhosseini requested that shift. In 2026 the company changed its name to Evergreen Connect.

== Other appointments and international interactions ==
Khademhosseini was on sabbatical in 2011 as a Harrington fellow at the University of Texas-Austin with Prof. Nicholas Peppas.

Khademhosseini was also affiliated with Tohoku University, WPI - AIMR program in Sendai, Japan.

== Awards and honors ==
Khademhosseini's interdisciplinary research has been recognized over 70 major national and international awards. He is a recipient of the Massachusetts Institute of Technology Outstanding Undergraduate mentor award. He has also received the American Chemical Society's Viktor K. Lamer award, the Unilever award, and has been recognized by major governmental Awards including the and the Office of Naval Research Young Investigator award.

Selected Awards

- Materials Research Society Mid Career Research Award (2025)
- AICHE Acrivos Award for Professional Progress (2024)
- Biomaterials Global Impact Award (2024)
- Technology Innovation and Development Award - Society for Biomaterials (2024)
- Research.com Best Scientist Award (2022, 2023, 2024)
- Research.com Materials Science in United States Leader Award (2023, 2024)
- Thompson Reuters - Highly Cited Researcher (every year from 2014 through 2024)
- Biotechnology Progress award for Excellence in Publication (2022)
- Mustafa Prize (2019)
- Acta Biomaterialia Silver Medal (2018)
- Clemson Award of the Society for Biomaterials (2017)
- Sr. Scientist Award of Tissue Engineering and Regenerative Medicine Society-Americas (TERMIS-AM) (2017)
- Pioneers of Miniaturization Prize from the Royal Society of Chemistry (2016)
- IEEE EMBS William J. Morlock Award (2016)
- AIChE Nanoscale Science & Engineering Forum Young Investigator Award (2014)
- International Union of Materials Research Societies (IUMRS) Singapore Young Researcher Award (2014)
- ACS Kavli Foundation Emerging Leader in Chemistry (2014)
- Presidential Early Career Award for Scientists and Engineers (PECASE) by President Barack Obama, the highest honor given by the US government for early-career investigators (2011)
- Young investigator award, Society for Biomaterials (2008)
- TR35 Award by MIT Technology Review as one of the world's top young innovators (2007)
- Young investigator award, Tissue Engineering and Regenerative Medicine International Society.

Fellowships and Membership in Societies

- Fellow, National Academy of Inventors
- Fellow, International Academy of Medical and Biological Engineering
- Fellow, Canadian Academy of Engineering
- Fellow, Royal Society of Canada
- Fellow, American Institute for Medical and Biological Engineering (AIMBE)
- Fellow, Biomedical Engineering Society (BMES)
- Fellow, Royal Society of Chemistry
- Fellow of Biomaterials Science and Engineering (FBSE)
- Fellow, Materials Research Society (MRS)
- Fellow, American Association for the Advancement of Science (AAAS)
- Sr Member, IEEE

== Sources & External links ==
- Harvard-MIT faculty profile
- TR35 profile
- NanoQuebec
- Regenerate tissue engineering conference
- Lab on a Chip
- U of T engineering speaker
- Microengineering the cellular environment
- Khademhosseini wins the Coulter Foundation Early Career Award
- Scholarly works by Khademhosseini
- HST faculty wins the BMW Scientific award
