= Neo-organ =

Tissue engineering structure

In tissue engineering, neo-organ is the final structure of a procedure based on transplantation consisting of endogenous stem/progenitor cells grown ex vivo within predesigned matrix scaffolds. Current organ donation faces the problems of patients waiting to match for an organ and the possible risk of the patient's body rejecting the organ. Neo-organs are being researched as a solution to those problems with organ donation. Suitable methods for creating neo-organs are still under development. One experimental method is using adult stem cells, which use the patients own stem cells for organ donation. Currently this method can be combined with decellularization, which uses a donor organ for structural support but removes the donors cells from the organ. Similarly, the concept of 3-D bioprinting organs has shown experimental success in printing bioink layers that mimic the layer of organ tissues. However, these bioinks do not provide structural support like a donor organ. Current methods of clinically successful neo-organs use a combination of decellularized donor organs, along with adult stem cells of the organ recipient to account for both the structural support of a donor organ and the personalization of the organ for each individual patient to reduce the chance of rejection.

== Background ==
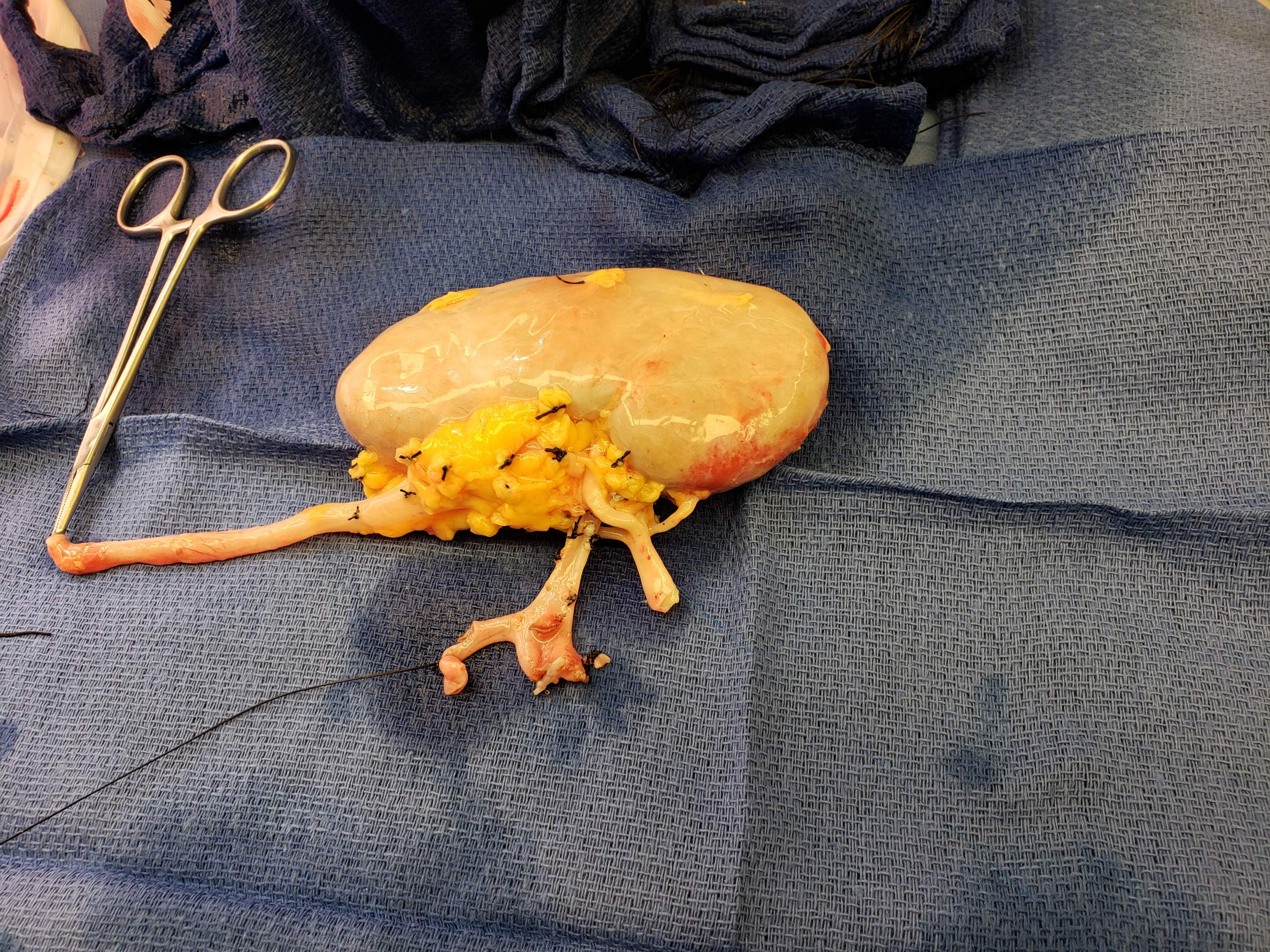
Donated organ prepared for kidney transplant.

The word neo-organ comes from the Greek word "neos," which means new. Organ transplants have been successfully used for medical purposes since 1954. The difficulty with the traditional process of organ transplants is that it requires waiting for a viable donor to donate an organ. The process of matching the organ to make sure it is compatible with the patient has also proven to be challenging. There are two main challenges: finding the right candidate for the patient and avoiding the patient rejecting the organ even if it is a match. Neo-organs can be used to avoid the process of organ matching and donating.

== Neo-Organ Creation Methods ==
Research is being conducted for methods of creating neo-organs including three methods such as using adult stem cells, decellularization, and 3-D Bioprinting:

=== Adult Stem Cells ===
One of the most studied methods is to use the patients own cells to generate a new organ, ex-vivo Specifically, researchers have chosen to focus on adult stem cells, or somatic stem cells, for the generation of new organ cells to create organs. There has been success in the production and use of some organs. The first stem-cell based organ, a tracheal graft, was transplanted successfully in 2008. The method involves obtaining a donor organ, removing the cells and MHC antigens from the donor organ, and colonizing it with stem cells obtained from the patient. This method does not create an entire organ from stem cells, and it still requires a donor to provide the decellularized graft. However, the first surgery done with this method was successful and the patient has shown no signs of rejection since. The current debate with this method is whether the decellularized graft was only used to provide the shape of the organ, or whether it provided benefits from it being a donor graft. Current research is being done to find ways to use adult stem cells for neo-organs without using decellularized donor organs for structural support.

=== Decellularization ===
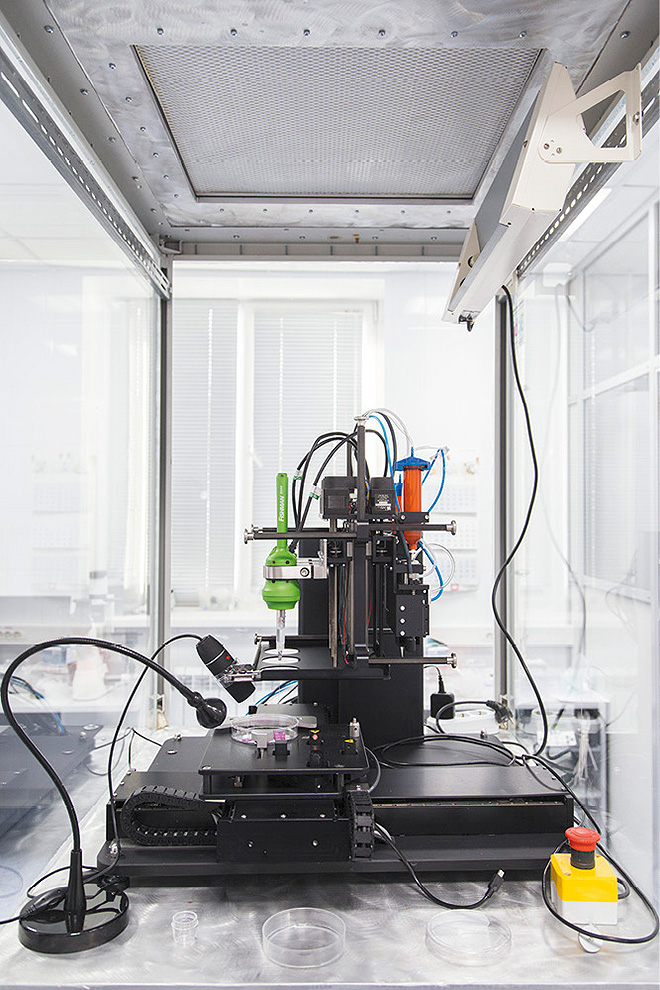
An example of a 3D Bioprinter that can be used for organ printing.

Researchers have begun to focus on decellularization for organ transplants since it reduces the chance of rejection to almost none. This process was used in the first successful stem-cell based organ transplant by removing the cells and MHC antigens from the donor organ. There are different ways to remove the cells from the organ which can include physical, chemical, and enzymatic treatments. This method is especially useful when trying to create a neo-heart because the heart needs to be created in a way where the structure remains. Since the stem cells used are currently not able to maintain a shape, researchers have started to look more into decellularization of existing organs to be able to perform successful transplant procedures without the problem of rejection. While this method may assist with the problem of rejection, donors are still needed to provide this structure to patients.

=== 3-D Bioprinting ===
The process of creating a 3-D organ with stem cells is thought to not be possible without the structural support of a donor organ. However, new studies are being conducted that discuss research on the process of 3-D bioprinting organs. The process of 3-D Bioprinting includes combining cells and growth factors to create a bioink, then using that bioink to print individual layers of tissue. Research is being done to find ways to use the formulated bioink to print organs that have the same structural support of donor organs without the need for donors. While currently there have not been experimental success with printing structural organs, there has been success with using bioink for printing tissue layers. A method for creating gelatin based vascularized bone equivalents has shown to be successful in a small scale experiment, but it has not been used clinically.
