= International Society for Biofabrication =

The International Society for Biofabrication (ISBF) is an international, non-profit scientific and professional organization established in 2010 to support and represent the global biofabrication community. The society promotes research, education, and technological development across biofabrication, with a focus on interdisciplinary integration and translation from fundamental science to medical and clinical applications.

== History ==
ISBF was founded in response to the emergence of biofabrication as a distinct, rapidly expanding field combining biology, materials science, engineering, and medicine. Since its inception, the society has provided a central platform for international collaboration and knowledge exchange, most notably through the annual International Conference on Biofabrication, where the General Assembly convenes to elect officers, amend statutes, and guide the society's strategic direction under the leadership of the president and board of directors.

== Journal ==
Biofabrication is a peer-reviewed scientific journal and the official journal of the International Society for Biofabrication, publishing research on biofabrication technologies, biological constructs, and their modeling and maturation.
