= Artificial urinary bladder =

The two main methods for replacing bladder function involve either redirecting urine flow or replacing the bladder in situ. Replacement can be done with an artificial urinary bladder, an artificial organ.

== Development ==
On January 30, 1999, scientists announced that lab-grown bladders had been successfully transplanted into dogs. These artificial bladders worked well for almost a year in the dogs.

In 2000, a new procedure for creating artificial bladders for humans was developed. This procedure is called an orthotopic neobladder procedure. This procedure involves shaping a part (usually 35 to 40 inches) of a patient's small intestine to form a new bladder; however, these bladders made of intestinal tissues produced unpleasant side-effects. The current standard for repairing a damaged urinary bladder involves partial or complete replacement using tissue from the small intestine.

In 2006, the first publication of experimental transplantation of bioengineered bladders appeared in The Lancet. The trial involved seven people with spina bifida between the ages of four and nineteen who had been followed for up to five years after surgery to determine long-term effects. The bladders were prepared and the trial run by a team of biologists at the Wake Forest University School of Medicine and Boston Children's Hospital led by Professor Anthony Atala. Bioengineered organs which rely on a patient's own cells, autologous constructs, are not subject to transplant rejection, unlike transplants from human or animal donors.
