= Peter Zandstra =

Canadian scientist

Peter Zandstra CM FRSC
- Born: Peter W. Zandstra
- Education: McGill University; University of British Columbia (PhD); Massachusetts Institute of Technology
- Father: Hubert Zandstra
- Awards: FRSC
- Scientific career
- Fields: Stem Cell Bioengineering; Signalling Dynamics; Cell Process Dynamics
- Institutions: University of Toronto; McEwen Centre for Regenerative Medicine; University of British Columbia
- Website: www.stemcellbioengineering.ca

Peter W. Zandstra, CM FRSC, is a Canadian scientist who is the Vice-President, Research and Innovation of the University of British Columbia, the Founding Director of the UBC School of Biomedical Engineering (SBME), and a Professor in the UBC School of Biomedical Engineering. Previously he was a professor at the University of Toronto.

== Education ==
Zandstra graduated with a Bachelor of Engineering degree from McGill University in the Department of Chemical Engineering and later obtained his Ph.D. degree from the University of British Columbia in the Department of Chemical Engineering and Biotechnology, under the supervision of Jamie Piret and Connie Eaves. He continued his research training as a postdoctoral fellow in the field of bioengineering at the Massachusetts Institute of Technology (with Doug Lauffenburger) before being appointed to the University of Toronto in 1999.

== Career ==
In 2007, Zandstra was appointed as a professor at the University of Toronto's Institute of Biomaterials and Biomedical Engineering. He was cross appointed with the Departments of Chemical Engineering and Applied Chemistry and Medical Genetics. In 2016, Zandstra became a professor at the University of British Columbia. He served as the Founding Director of the School of Biomedical Engineering at the University of British Columbia and was the director of the Michael Smith Laboratories until July 2022. In July 2023, he was reappointed to a second term as director of the School of Biomedical Engineering.

Zandstra also serves on the advisory board of the Phil and Penny Knight Campus for Accelerating Scientific Impact of the University of Oregon and serves as Chief Scientist at the Creative Destruction Lab. He also is a Chief Scientific Officer at the Centre for Commercialization of Regenerative Medicine and is a part of the Silver Creek Pharmaceuticals team.

== Research ==
Research in the Zandstra Laboratory is focused on the regeneration of functional tissues from stem cells, and the development and utilization of tools to modulate the responses of stem cells in vitro and in vivo. Interest in the generation of primary cells and tissues ex vivo is driven both by their potential use as a direct clinical modality and as human tissue analogues for the development of novel therapeutic agents. Zandstra's group is particularly interested in understanding the role that the extracellular environment, the stem cell niche, plays in controlling stem cell fate decisions. Using quantitative bioengineering approaches including micro-fabrication, bioreactors, mathematical modeling, protein engineering and cell engineering, the Zandstra Lab is discovering how stem cells integrate their complex microenvironment to make self-renewal or differentiation divisions. The group is focused on using this understanding to enable new therapeutically and technologically relevant strategies in regenerative medicine. The Zandstra lab focuses in particular on understanding how to grow human blood stem cells, and on understanding how to differentiate pluripotent stem cells into functional blood, cardiac, and pancreatic tissue.

Zandstra currently serves as associate editor for the journals Stem Cells, Stem Cell Research and Biotechnology and Bioengineering.

In addition to his research, Zandstra teaches in cellular engineering, having developed both undergraduate and graduate curricula covering the use of mathematical models to describe and predict cell fate decisions. Zandstra helped with the founding of the IBBME teaching laboratory, designing and implementing more than 6 labs. He currently serves as the director of the University of Toronto's Minor in Bioengineering, an engineering faculty-wide program designed to give undergraduate students a co-ordained series of courses in bioengineering related topics.

== Awards and honours ==
In 2008, during an annual conference held by the American Association for the Advancement of Science, Zandstra was inducted as its Fellow.

In 2014, Zandstra was elected as a Fellow of the Royal Society of Canada and a year later he was recognized for contributions to development and commercialization of stem cell-based therapies and became a recipient of the Scale-Up and Manufacturing of Cell-Based Therapies Award.

In 2017, Zandstra was appointed as Canada Research Chair in Stem Cell Bioengineering.

His other recognitions include:

- Premiers Research Excellence Award (2002)
- E.W.R. Steacie Memorial Fellowship (2005)
- John Simon Guggenheim Memorial Foundation Fellowship (2007)
- Canada's Top 40 Under 40 (2008)
- McLean Award (2008)
- Fellow of the AIMBE
- Till and McCulloch Award (2013)
- Fellow of the American Institute of Chemical Engineers
- Member of the Order of Canada (2022)
