= Wake Forest Institute for Regenerative Medicine =

Research institute in Winston-Salem, North Carolina

The Wake Forest Institute for Regenerative Medicine (WFIRM) is a research institute affiliated with Wake Forest School of Medicine and located in Winston-Salem, North Carolina, United States.

WFIRM's goal is to apply the principles of regenerative medicine to repair or replace diseased tissues and organs. Among other goals, WFIRM scientists are looking for ways to create insulin-producing cells in the laboratory, engineered blood vessels for heart bypass surgery and treat knee injuries through regenerated meniscus tissues. WFIRM has also led two federal initiatives to regenerate tissues from battlefield injuries (AFIRM I and AFIRM II), with a combined funding of $160 million from the U.S. Department of Defense. WFIRM is working to develop more than 40 different organs and tissues in the laboratory.

Anthony Atala, M.D., is the director of the institute, which is located in Wake Forest Innovation Quarter in downtown Winston-Salem. Atala was recruited by Wake Forest Baptist Medical Center in 2004, and brought many of his team members from the Laboratory for Tissue Engineering and Cellular Therapeutics at the Children's Hospital Boston and Harvard Medical School. Notable achievements announced at WFIRM have been the first lab-grown organ, a urinary bladder. The artificial urinary bladder was the first to be implanted into a human. WFIRM research also discovered stem cells harvested from the amniotic fluid of pregnant women. These stems cells are pluripotent, meaning that they can be manipulated to differentiate into various types of mature cells that make up nerve, muscle, bone, and other tissues while avoiding the problems of tumor formation and ethical concerns that are associated with embryonic stem cells. Research at WFIRM was also essential towards developing the field of bioprinting. This was first accomplished by converting a Hewlett Packard paper and ink printer to deposit cells, which is now on display at the National Museum of Health and Medicine. Later, the more advanced Integrated Tissue-Organ Printer (ITOP) was developed at the institute.

In 2019, the U.S. federal Department of Health and Human Services (HHS) provided a 5-year grant through BARDA to support further development of WFIRM technology to better understand damage to the body caused by inhaling chlorine gas. The technology is called "lung-on-a-chip" and is a part of a "miniaturized system of human organs" developed by WFIRM that can allow researchers to create models of the body's response to harmful agents.

The Institute also is involved in research on energy fields and the human biofield. This led to a retracted article on Energy Medicine.
