= Biofabrication =

Scientific field

Biofabrication is a branch of biotechnology specialising in the research and development of biologically engineered processes for the automated production of biologically functional products through bioprinting or bioassembly and subsequent tissue maturation processes; as well as techniques such as directed assembly, which employs localised external stimuli guide the fabrication process; enzymatic assembly, which utilises selective biocatalysts to build macromolecular structures; and self-assembly, in which the biological material guides its own assembly according to its internal information. These processes may facilitate fabrication at the micro- and nanoscales. Biofabricated products are constructed and structurally organised with a range of biological materials including bioactive molecules, biomaterials, living cells, cell aggregates such as micro-tissues and micro-organs on chips, and hybrid cell-material constructs.

Biofabrication is defined as "the automated generation of biologically functional products with structural organisation from living cells, bioactive molecules, biomaterials, cell aggregates such as microtissues, or hybrid cell material constructs, through bioprinting or bioassembly and subsequent tissue maturation processes" by the International Society for Biofabrication (ISBF).

== Techniques in biofabrication ==
Bioprinting: This method uses computer-aided design to layer living cells and biomaterials, constructing complex three-dimensional structures that mimic natural tissues. Bioprinting allows for precise placement of multiple cell types, enabling the creation of heterogeneous tissue structures.

Biofabrication allows researchers to combine fabrication techniques with 2D/3D printing and biomanufacturing and bioassembly of living 3D functional biological products using smart and cytocompatible biomaterials.

== Applications in regenerative medicine ==
Scientists are developing techniques to biofabricate tissues and organs to combat the global shortage of organ donors. By creating scaffolds that support cell growth and differentiation simple tissues like skin and cartilage have been developed and are already used in clinical settings. These engineered tissues can be used for transplantation or as models for drug testing. Despite this progress in tissue engineering there are still big drawbacks in producing complex and functional 3D tissues and organs especial the organs that are urgently needed in transplants applications.

Advancements in bioprinting have led to the fabrication of organ-like structures, such as liver and kidney tissues. This promotes faster healing and fewer post-transplant complications as they are custom made from the patients cells so this eliminate graft rejection. While fully functional printed organs for transplantation remain a future goal, current progress indicates significant potential for addressing organ shortages.

== Challenges and future directions ==
In vivo regeneration often results in fibrous tissues with poor nutrient supply and poor blood flow. Using bio-inks such as GelMA enables controlled extracorporeal organ fabrication with precise tissue assembly and maturation before implantation. However, functional engineered organs face challenges as researchers do not have any control with the natural process after implantation. Therefore, biofabrication is aimed at extracorporeal organ engineering where tissue formation can be under human controlled conditions. Significant technological challenges exists, although 3D printing organs have advanced there is still need for it to have better biocompatibility and biofunctionality. Even though there as some successful trails and small implications today the big application of 3D printing organs does not fulfil those two criteria. Thus, researchers are facing challenges in finding materials they fulfil both.

== See also ==
- Biofabrication (journal) – Scientific journal on biofabrication
- Bionics – Application of natural systems to technology
- Biosensor – Probe which tests for biological molecules
- Organ culture – Cultivation of organ tissue in vitro
- Synthetic biology – Interdisciplinary branch of biology and engineering
- Tissue engineering – Biomedical engineering discipline
- CRISPR gene editing – Gene editing method
