= Ethics of bioprinting =

Ethics of bioprinting is a sub-field of ethics concerning bioprinting. Some of the ethical issues surrounding bioprinting include equal access to treatment, clinical safety complications, and the enhancement of human body (Dodds 2015).

3D printing was invented by Charles Hull in the mid-1980s. 3D printing is a process in additive manufacturing which uses a digital design to produce a physical copy. This process is carried out by a specific printer, which uses several layers in order to complete the design. However, bioprinting uses the ways of 3D printing to create things such as organs, tissues, cells, blood vessels, prosthetics and a broad range of other things that can be used in the medical field. The ethics of bioprinting have been a topic of discussion as long as bioprinting has been popular. Ethics are moral principles that govern production, behavior, etc.

== Equal access to treatment ==
Bioprinting focuses on the individual care rather than developing a universal treatment plan for all patients. Personalized medicine is expensive and increases the disparity between the rich and poor. Since 3D printing is an individual treatment, the general public assumes that it may prevent people with financial issues from receiving care. However, bioprinting improves universal access to healthcare because it will eventually "bring down the time and cost" of treatment. For example, prosthetic limbs and orthopedic surgery can be done in an efficient and inexpensive manner. People would not have to wait months for their prosthetics, which will ultimately decrease the medical expense. The bioprinter may be used to manufacture bone replacements and produce customized prosthetic limbs quickly. Also the printing of human organs, and tissues, are available with decreased time, only taking a few weeks to produce instead of a regular transplant. Currently in the United States, approximately 115,000 people are awaiting a transplant, which can take nearly two years to obtain, while nearly 2 million people have lost a limb. Those who were previously excluded from these medical advancements will now have access to them.

== Safety ==
Any new treatment involving 3D printers is risky and patients must be well informed of the health implications. Doctors hope in the future to print organs in order to replace dysfunctional bio-structures. Similar to organ donations, the cells must match genetically otherwise the recipient's body will reject the organ. The patient would then have an autoimmune response and destroy the donated tissue. The individual's stem cells must be used to manufacture the organ for the specific patient. In order to advance this technology, the medical field must find a way to test and standardize organ production.

== Human enhancement ==
Bioprinting may be used to increase human performance, strength, speed, or endurance. For instance, bioprinting may be used to manufacture enhanced bones and replace regular human bones that are stronger and more flexible. The 3D printer could also be used to increase muscle performance by making muscles more "resilient and less likely to become fatigued". Lung capacity could also be improved by replacing it with an artificial lung that can increase oxygen efficiency in the blood. Human enhancement would have a dangerous but incredible impact on society; bioprinting could create a culture without disease or imperfection.

== Legality and policies ==
Bioprinted items would require regulation to ensure safety and effectiveness. In the United States, this is the job of the FDA. The FDA must make sure that printed organs are handled a bit differently than human organs because bioprinting is a new and developing treatment, and therefore little is known about its interactions with the human body. Bioprinting faces trade-offs between restricted use and open use. Restricted use will allow bioprinting to only be done by trained professionals, whereas open use is more of a free-for-all. There are also trade-offs between if it is ethical to mass-produce organs or if it could make issues in transplant cases worse. Selling bioprinted organs may be illegal under existing laws meant to stop the blackmarket trade of human organs.
