= Biologic =

Biologic may refer to:

- biology – a process or phenomenon connected with life or living organisms
- biologic medical product – a medicinal preparation created by a biological process
