= Stem Cell Research (journal) =

- Discipline: Cell biology
- Language: English
- Edited by: Thomas Zwaka

Publication details
- History: 2007–present
- Publisher: Elsevier
- Frequency: 8/year
- Impact factor: 0.8 (2023)

Standard abbreviations
- ISO 4: Stem Cell Res.

Indexing
- ISSN: 1873-5061 (print); 1876-7753 (web)
- LCCN: 2008243605
- OCLC no.: 232352290

Links
- Journal homepage; Online archive

Stem Cell Research is a peer-reviewed open-access scientific journal covering research on stem cells. The journal was established in 2007 and is published 8 times per year by Elsevier. The editor-in-chief is Thomas Zwaka (Icahn School of Medicine at Mount Sinai).

== Abstracting and indexing ==
The journal is abstracted and indexed in the following bibliographic databases:

- BIOSIS
- Biological Abstracts
- Biotechnology Citation Index
- Chemical Abstracts
- Directory of Open Access Journals
- ISI
- Journal Citation Reports/Science Edition
- MEDLINE
- PubMed
- SciSearch
- Scopus

According to the Journal Citation Reports, the journal has a 2023 impact factor of 0.8.
