= Anthony Atala =

American bioengineer and urologist

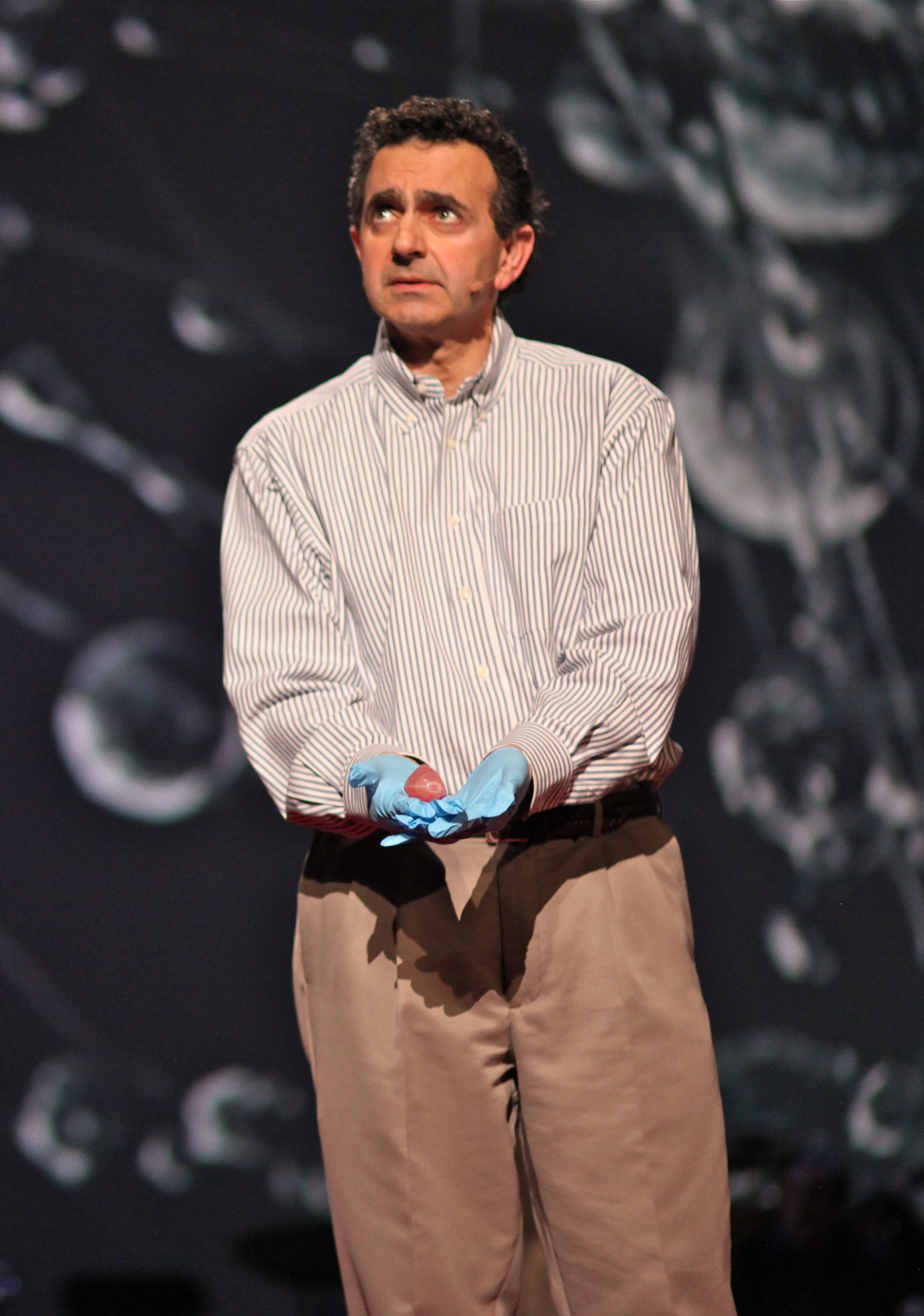
- Atala in 2011
- Born: July 14, 1958 (age 68); Peru
- Education: University of Miami (BS); University of Louisville (MD)
- Occupations: Professor and director of the Wake Forest Institute for Regenerative Medicine, and chair of the Department of Urology at Wake Forest School of Medicine in North Carolina

Anthony Atala (born July 14, 1958) is an American bioengineer, urologist, and pediatric surgeon. He is the W.H. Boyce professor of urology, the founding director of the Wake Forest Institute for Regenerative Medicine, and the chair of the Department of Urology at Wake Forest School of Medicine in North Carolina. His work focuses on the science of regenerative medicine: "a practice that aims to refurbish diseased or damaged tissue using the body's own healthy cells".

Dr. Atala is the creator of the first 3D bioprinters (Integrated Tissue and Organ Printing System or ITOP) and is one of the foremost leading figures in the field of organ printing. Atala and his team developed the first lab-grown organ (a bladder) to be implanted into a human. He is also developing experimental technology that can 3D print human tissue on demand.

As director of the Wake Forest Institute for Regenerative Medicine, Dr. Atala leads a team of more than 400 researchers dedicated to developing cell therapies and engineering replacement tissues and organs for more than 40 different areas of the body.

Dr. Atala is editor of 3 journals and 25 books including Principles of Regenerative Medicine, Foundations of Regenerative Medicine, Methods of Tissue Engineering and Minimally Invasive Urology. He has published over 800 journal articles and has received more than 250 national and international patents. Fifteen technology applications developed in Dr. Atala's laboratory have been used clinically.

He serves on the editorial board of the scientific journal Rejuvenation Research, on the national board of advisors for High Point University and on the SENS Research Foundation's research advisory board. He is a founding member of the Tissue Engineering and Regenerative Medicine International Society (TERMIS) from which he received the Lifetime Achievement Award. Atala is the director of the Armed Forces Institute of Regenerative Medicine, a federally funded institute created to apply regenerative medicine.

== Biography ==
Atala was born in Peru and raised in Coral Gables, Florida. Atala attended the University of Miami, and he has an undergraduate degree in psychology. He attended medical school at the University of Louisville, where he also completed his residency in urology. He did his fellowship at the Harvard Medical School–affiliated Boston Children's Hospital from 1990 to 1992, where he trained under world-renowned pediatric.

== Career ==
Atala served as the director of the Laboratory for Tissue Engineering and Cellular Therapeutics at Boston Children's Hospital. His work there involved growing human tissues and organs to replace those damaged by disease or defect. This work became important due to shortages in the organ-donor program.

Atala continued his work in tissue engineering and printable organs after moving to Wake Forest Baptist Medical Center and the Wake Forest School of Medicine in 2004.

Along with Harvard University researchers, and as described in the journal Nature Biotechnology, Atala has announced that stem cells with enormous potential can be harvested from the amniotic fluid of pregnant women. These amniotic stem cells are pluripotent, meaning they can be manipulated to differentiate into various types of mature cells that make up nerve, muscle, bone, and other tissues, while avoiding the problem of tumor formation and the ethical concerns associated with embryonic stem cells.

With respect to the amniotic fluid stem cells ("AFS" cells), Atala has said the following:

The cells come from the fetus, which breathes and sucks in, then excretes, the amniotic fluid throughout pregnancy. ... Like embryonic stem cells, they appear to thrive in lab dishes for years, while normal cells, called somatic cells, die after a time. ... They are easier to grow than human embryonic stem cells. And, unlike embryonic stem cells, they do not form a type of benign tumour called a teratoma. ... A bank with 100,000 specimens of the amniotic stem cells theoretically could supply 99 per cent of the US population with perfect genetic matches for transplants.

Atala's work was seized on by opponents of the Embryonic Stem Cell Research Bill (a part of the 100-Hour Plan of the Democratic Party in the 110th United States Congress) as a more moral alternative. He wrote a letter saying, inter alia, "Some may be interpreting my research as a substitute for the need to pursue other forms of regenerative medicine therapies, such as those involving embryonic stem cells. I disagree with that assertion."

== Awards ==
Atala has been widely recognized for his scientific contributions. His faculty website lists awards and citations including:

- Elected to the Institute of Medicine of the National Academy of Sciences in 2011
- Elected to the National Academy of Inventors as a charter fellow in 2013
- Elected to the American Institute for Medical and Biological Engineering in 2016.
- The Christopher Columbus Foundation Award, bestowed on a living American who is currently working on a discovery that will significantly affect society.
- The World Technology Award in Health and Medicine, presented to individuals achieving significant, lasting progress in 2011.
- The Samuel D. Gross Prize, awarded every five years to a national leading surgical researcher by the Philadelphia Academy of Surgery.
- The Barringer Medal from the American Association of Genitourinary Surgeons.
- The Gold Cystoscope Award (2000) from the American Urological Association for advances in the field.
- The American Ingenuity Award for Life Sciences, awarded by Smithsonian magazine (2016).
- The Innovation Award from the Society of Manufacturing Engineers for the creation of synthetic organs
- The Rocovich Gold Medal, awarded to a distinguished scientist who has made a major impact on science
- The 2013 Edison Awards
- The 2016 Smithsonian Ingenuity Award
- The 2016 R&D Magazine Innovator of the Year Award for his work with bioprinting
- Named by Nature Biotechnology as one of the top 10 translational researchers in the world
- Named by Life Sciences Intellectual Property Review as one of the top influencers in the life sciences intellectual property field
- Named by U.S. News & World Report as one of 14 Pioneers of Medical Progress in the 21st Century
- Named by Scientific American as one of the world's most influential people in biotechnology and as a Medical Treatments Leader of the Year for his contributions to the fields of cell, tissue, and organ regeneration in 2015.
- Dr. Atala's work has been listed twice as one of Time magazine's top ten medical breakthroughs of the year and once as one of 5 discoveries that will change the future of organ transplantation
- Discover magazine's top science story of the year in the field of medicine in 2007.
