= Gelatin methacryloyl =

Material for biomedical applications

Gelatin methacryloyl (GelMA) is a modified form of gelatin that has been chemically functionalized with methacryloyl groups, allowing it to form a stable hydrogel when exposed to UV light and a photoinitiator. This methacrylic anhydride-modified gelatin is used as a base for 3D printing hydrogel bioinks, particularly for applications in tissue engineering, 3D bioprinting, and regenerative medicine.

== Structure and composition ==
GelMA is derived from gelatin, a protein obtained by the partial hydrolysis of collagen, which is the primary structural protein in animal connective tissues. The methacryloyl modification allows GelMA to be crosslinked under UV light in the presence of a photoinitiator. This crosslinking gives GelMA its gel-like consistency and stability, while still retaining properties similar to natural extracellular matrices (ECM).

== Properties ==
=== Biocompatibility ===
GelMA is highly biocompatible, meaning it supports cell attachment, proliferation, and differentiation. This makes it ideal for creating scaffolds that mimic the natural cellular environment, allowing for tissue growth.

=== Mechanical tunability ===
By adjusting the degree of methacrylation, concentration of GelMA, or crosslinking parameters (such as UV exposure time and photoinitiator concentration), researchers can tailor the mechanical properties of GelMA hydrogels. This tunability allows for a range of applications, from softer gels suited for applications like cardiac tissue engineering to stiffer gels for bone or cartilage applications.

== Applications ==
=== Tissue engineering and regenerative medicine ===
GelMA hydrogels can support 3D cell culture, which is essential for creating realistic tissue models that mimic in vivo conditions.

=== 3D bioprinting ===
GelMA is often used as a "bioink" in 3D bioprinting to fabricate complex tissue structures layer by layer. Its printability, combined with biocompatibility, makes it ideal for generating tissues for regenerative medicine research. GelMA is widely researched for applications such as vascular, cardiac, neural, cartilage, and bone tissue engineering. The hydrogel matrix supports various cell types, including stem cells, which can be differentiated into specific cell types to study diseases, drug responses, or potential treatments. GelMA hydrogels can also serve as a medium for drug delivery or wound healing, due to their capability to be loaded with bioactive molecules and cells.

=== Synthesis for 3D bioprinting ===
The synthesis of gelatin methacryloyl (GelMA) for bioprinting applications commences with the methacrylation of gelatin, typically in a buffered solution (e.g. PBS) at a controlled temperature (e.g. 50°C), using methacrylic anhydride (MAA) as the reactant. This reaction introduces photoreactive methacrylate groups onto the gelatin backbone. The resulting solution is subsequently purified, most commonly via dialysis to remove unreacted reagents and byproducts, followed by lyophilization to yield a stable, porous foam. For use as a bioink, this purified GelMA is dissolved in a sterile, physiologically relevant buffer (such as cell culture media) at the target concentration, and a photoinitiator (e.g. LAP) is added to enable photocrosslinking upon exposure to specific wavelength light (e.g. UV or visible light) during the bioprinting process.

== See also ==
- Biofabrication
