= Biological material =

Biological material may refer to:

== Natural materials ==
- Organic matter, matter that has come from a once-living organism, or is composed of organic compounds
- A chemical substance present or produced in a living organism
  - Biomolecule, a molecule present in a living organism
  - Biogenic substance, a chemical substance produced by a living organism
  - Biotic material, natural material, or natural product, a material produced by a living organism
- Biomass, living or dead biological matter, often plants grown as fuel
- Biomass (ecology), the total mass of living matter in a given environment, or of a given species
- Body fluid, any liquid originating from inside the bodies of living people
- Cellular component, material and substances of which cells (and thus living organisms) are composed
- Tissue (biology), a cellular organizational level intermediate between cells and a complete organ
- Viable material, capable of living, developing, or germinating under favorable conditions (see Viability selection)

== Human-made materials ==
- Bio-based material, a processed biotic material
- Biocomposite, a composite material formed by a matrix (resin) and a reinforcement of natural fibers
- Biomaterial, any substance that has been engineered to interact with biological systems for a medical purpose
