= Bio-ink =

Materials used to 3D print artificial tissue

Bio-inks are materials used to produce engineered/artificial live tissue using 3D printing. These inks are mostly composed of the cells that are being used, but are often used in tandem with additional materials that envelope the cells. The combination of cells and usually biopolymer gels are defined as a bio-ink. They must meet certain characteristics, including such as rheological, mechanical, biofunctional and biocompatibility properties, among others. Using bio-inks provides a high reproducibility and precise control over the fabricated constructs in an automated manner. These inks are considered as one of the most advanced tools for tissue engineering and regenerative medicine (TERM).

Like the thermoplastics that are often utilized in traditional 3D printing, bio-inks can be extruded through printing nozzles or needles into filaments that can maintain its shape fidelity after deposition. However, bio-ink are sensitive to the normal 3D printing processing conditions.

Differences from traditional 3D printing materials

- Printed at a much lower temperature (37 °C or below)
- Mild cross-linking conditions
- Natural derivation
- Bioactive
- Cell manipulatable

== Printability ==
Bio-ink compositions and chemistries are often inspired and derived from existing hydrogel biomaterials. However, these hydrogel biomaterials were often developed to be easily pipetted and cast into well plates and other molds. Altering the composition of these hydrogels to permit filament formation is necessary for their translation as bioprintable materials. However, the unique properties of bio-inks offer new challenges in characterizing material printability.

Traditional bioprinting techniques involve depositing material layer-by-layer to create the end structure, but in 2019 a new method called volumetric bioprinting was introduced. Volumetric bioprinting occurs when a bio-ink is placed in a liquid cell and is selectively irradiated by an energy source. This method will actively polymerize the irradiated material and that will comprise the final structure. Manufacturing biomaterials using volumetric bioprinting of bio-inks can greatly decrease the manufacturing time. In materials science, this is a breakthrough that allows personalized biomaterials to be quickly generated. The procedure must be developed and studied clinically before any major advances in the bioprinting industry can be realized.

Unlike traditional 3D printing materials such as thermoplastics that are essentially 'fixed' once they are printed, bio-inks are a dynamic system because of their high water content and often non-crystalline structure. The shape fidelity of the bio-ink after filament deposition must also be characterized. Finally, the printing pressure and nozzle diameter must be taken into account to minimize the shear stresses placed on the bio-ink and on any cells within the bio-ink during the printing process. Too high shear forces may damage or lyse cells, adversely affecting cell viability.

Important considerations in printability include:

- Uniformity in filament diameter
- Angles at the interaction of filaments
- "Bleeding" of filaments together at intersects
- Maintenance of shape fidelity after printing but before cross-linking
- Printing pressure and nozzle diameter
- Printing viscosity
- Gellation properties

== Classification of bio-inks ==
=== Structural ===
Structural bio-inks create the framework of the desired print using materials such as alginate, decellularized ECM, and gelatin. Through material selection, one can control mechanical properties, shape, size, and cell viability. Although foundational, structural bio-inks represent one of the most critical design considerations in bioprinting, as these controlled properties directly influence tissue functionality and integration.

=== Sacrificial ===
Sacrificial bio-inks are materials that will be used to support during printing and then will be removed from the print to create channels or empty regions within the outside structure. Channels and open spaces are massively important to allow for cellular migration and nutrient transportation lending them useful if trying to design a vascular network. These materials need to have specific properties dependent on the surrounding material that needs to stay such as water solubility, degradation under certain temperatures, or natural rapid degradation. Non Crosslinked gelatins and pluronics are examples of potential sacrificial material.

=== Functional ===
Functional bio-inks are some of the more complicated forms of ink, these are used to guide cellular growth, development, and differentiation. This can be done in the form of integrating growth factors, biological cues, and physical cues such as surface texture and shape. These materials could be described as the most important as they are the biggest factor in developing a functional tissue as well as structural related function.

=== Support ===
Bio printed structures can be extremely fragile and flimsy due to intricate structures and overhangs in the early period after printing. These support structures give them the chance to get out of that phase. Once the construct is self supportive, these can be removed. In other situations, such as introducing the construct to a bioreactor after printing, these structures can be used to allow for easy interface with systems used to develop the tissue at a faster rate.

== Polysaccharides ==
=== Alginate ===
Alginate is a naturally derived biopolymer from the cell wall of brown seaweed that has been widely used in biomedicine because of its biocompatibility, low cytotoxicity, mild gelation process and low cost. Alginates are particularly suitable for bioprinting due to their mild cross-linking conditions via incorporation of divalent ions such as calcium. These materials have been adopted as bio-inks through increasing their viscosity. Additionally, these alginate-based bio-inks can be blended with other materials such as nanocellulose for application in tissues such as cartilage.

Since fast gelation leads to good printability, bioprinting mainly utilizes alginate, modified alginate alone or alginate blended with other biomaterials. Alginate has become the most widely used natural polymer for bioprinting and is most likely the most common material of choice for in vivo studies.

=== Gellan gum ===
Gellan gum is a hydrophilic and high-molecular weight anionic polysaccharide produced by bacteria. It is very similar to alginate and can form a hydrogel at low temperatures. It is even approved for use in food by the United States Food and Drug Administration (FDA). Gellan gum is mainly used as a gelling agent and stabilizer. However, it is almost never used alone for bioprinting purposes.

=== Agarose ===
Agarose is a polysaccharide extracted from marine algae and red seaweed. It is commonly used in electrophoresis applications as well as tissue engineering for its gelling properties. The melting and gelling temperatures of agarose can be modified chemically, which in turn makes its printability better. Having a bio-ink that can be modified to fit a specific need and condition is ideal.

== Protein-based bio-inks ==
=== Gelatin ===
Gelatin has been widely utilized as a biomaterial for engineered tissues. The formation of gelatin scaffolds is dictated by the physical chain entanglements of the material which forms a gel at low temperatures. However, at physiological temperatures, the viscosity of gelatin drops significantly. Methacrylation of gelatin is a common approach for the fabrication of gelatin scaffolds that can be printed and maintain shape fidelity at physiological temperature.

=== Collagen ===
Collagen is the main protein in the extracellular matrix of mammalian cells. Because of this collagen possesses tissue-matching physicochemical properties and biocompatibility. On top of this, collagen has already been used in biomedical applications. Some studies that collagen has been used in are engineered skin tissue, muscle tissue and even bone tissue.

== Synthetic polymers ==
=== Pluronics ===
Pluronics have been utilized in printing application due to their unique gelation properties. Below physiological temperatures, the pluronics exhibit low viscosity. However, at physiological temperatures, the pluronics form a gel. However, the formed gel is dominated by physical interactions. A more permanent pluronic-based network can be formed through the modification of the pluronic chain with acrylate groups that may be chemically cross-linked.

=== PEG ===
Polyethylene glycol (PEG) is a synthetic polymer synthesized by ethylene oxide polymerization. It is a favorable synthetic material because of its tailorable but typically strong mechanical properties. PEG advantages also include non-cytotoxicity and non-immunogenicity. However, PEG is bioinert and needs to be combined with other biologically active hydrogels.

== Other bio-inks ==
=== Decellularized ECM ===
Decellularized extracellular matrix based bio-inks can be derived from nearly any mammalian tissue. Organs such as heart, muscle, cartilage, bone, and fat are decellularized, lyophilized, and pulverized, to create a soluble matrix that can then be formed into gels. These bio-inks possess several advantages over other materials due to their derivation from mature tissue. They consist of a complex mixture of ECM structural and decorating proteins specific to their tissue origin, and provide tissue-specific cues to cells. Often these bio-inks are cross-linked through thermal gelation or chemical cross-linking such as through the use of riboflavin. Different additives, e.g. GelMA, alginate, have been used to improve the printability of decellularized ECM.

== See also ==
- Biofabrication
- List of emerging technologies
- Organ-on-a-chip
