= 3D bioprinting =

3D printing to create biomedical parts

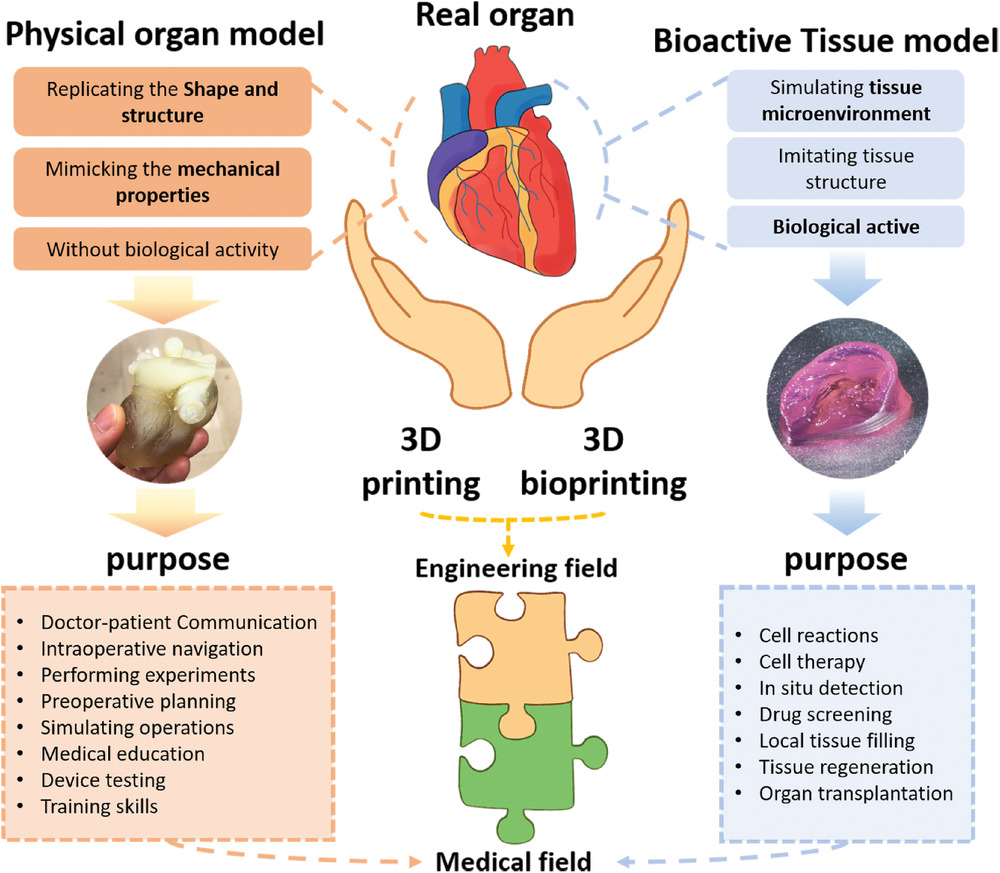
Different models of 3D printing tissue and organs

Three-dimensional (3D) bioprinting is the use of 3D printing–like techniques to combine cells, growth factors, bio-inks, and biomaterials to fabricate functional structures that were traditionally used for tissue engineering applications but in recent times have seen increased interest in other applications such as biosensing, and environmental remediation. Generally, 3D bioprinting uses a layer-by-layer method to deposit materials known as bio-inks to create tissue-like structures that are later used in various medical and tissue engineering fields. 3D bioprinting covers an extensive range of bioprinting techniques and biomaterials. Currently, bioprinting can be used to print tissue and organ models to help research drugs and potential treatments. Nonetheless, translation of bioprinted living cellular constructs into clinical application is met with several issues due to the complexity and cell number necessary to create functional organs. However, innovations span from bioprinting of extracellular matrix to mixing cells with hydrogels deposited layer by layer to produce the desired tissue. In addition, 3D bioprinting has begun to incorporate the printing of scaffolds which can be used to regenerate joints and ligaments. Apart from these, 3D bioprinting has recently been used in environmental remediation applications, including the fabrication of functional biofilms that host functional microorganisms that can facilitate pollutant removal.

== Process ==
Bioprinting of 3D Convoluted Renal Proximal Tubules on Perfusable Chips

3D bioprinting generally follows three steps: pre-bioprinting, bioprinting, and post-bioprinting.

=== Pre-bioprinting ===
Pre-bioprinting is the process of creating a model that the printer will later create and choosing the materials that will be used. One of the first steps is to obtain a biopsy of the organ, to sample cells. Common technologies used for bioprinting are computed tomography (CT) and magnetic resonance imaging (MRI). To print with a layer-by-layer approach, tomographic reconstruction is done on the images. The now-2D images are then sent to the printer to be made. Once the image is created, certain cells are isolated and multiplied. These cells are then mixed with a special liquefied material that provides oxygen and other nutrients to keep them alive. This aggregation of cells does not require a scaffold, and is required for placing in the tubular-like tissue fusion for processes such as extrusion.

=== Bioprinting ===
In the second step, the liquid mixtures of cells, matrix, and nutrients known as bioinks are placed in a printer cartridge and deposited using the patients' medical scans. When a bioprinted pre-tissue is transferred to an incubator, this cell-based pre-tissue matures into a tissue.

3D bioprinting for fabricating biological constructs typically involves dispensing cells onto a biocompatible scaffold using a successive layer-by-layer approach to generate tissue-like three-dimensional structures. Artificial organs such as livers and kidneys made by 3D bioprinting have been shown to lack crucial elements that affect the body such as working blood vessels, tubules for collecting urine, and the growth of billions of cells required for these organs. Without these components the body has no way to get the essential nutrients and oxygen deep within their interiors. Given that every tissue in the body is naturally composed of different cell types, many technologies for printing these cells vary in their ability to ensure stability and viability of the cells during the manufacturing process. Some of the methods that are used for 3D bioprinting of cells are photolithography, magnetic 3D bioprinting, stereolithography, and direct cell extrusion.

=== Post-bioprinting ===
The post-bioprinting process is necessary to create a stable structure from the biological material. If this process is not well-maintained, the mechanical integrity and function of the 3D printed object is at risk. To maintain the object, both mechanical and chemical stimulations are needed. These stimulations send signals to the cells to control the remodeling and growth of tissues. In addition, in recent development, bioreactor technologies have allowed the rapid maturation of tissues, vascularization of tissues and the ability to survive transplants.

Bioreactors work in either providing convective nutrient transport, creating microgravity environments, changing the pressure causing solution to flow through the cells, or adding compression for dynamic or static loading. Each type of bioreactor is ideal for different types of tissue, for example compression bioreactors are ideal for cartilage tissue.

== Bioprinting approach ==
Researchers in the field have developed approaches to produce living organs that are constructed with the appropriate biological and mechanical properties. 3D bioprinting is based on three main approaches: biomimicry, autonomous self-assembly and mini-tissue building blocks.

=== Biomimicry ===
The first approach of bioprinting is called biomimicry. The main goal of this approach is to create fabricated structures that are identical to the natural structure that are found in the tissues and organs in the human body. Biomimicry requires duplication of the shape, framework, and the microenvironment of the organs and tissues. The application of biomimicry in bioprinting involves creating both identical cellular and extracellular parts of organs. For this approach to be successful, the tissues must be replicated on a micro scale. Therefore, it is necessary to understand the microenvironment, the nature of the biological forces in this microenvironment, the precise organization of functional and supporting cell types, solubility factors, and the composition of extracellular matrix.

=== Autonomous self-assembly ===
The second approach of bioprinting is autonomous self-assembly. This approach relies on the physical process of embryonic organ development as a model to replicate the tissues of interest. When cells are in their early development, they create their own extracellular matrix building block, the proper cell signaling, and independent arrangement and patterning to provide the required biological functions and micro-architecture. Autonomous self-assembly demands specific information about the developmental techniques of the tissues and organs of the embryo. There is a "scaffold-free" model that uses self-assembling spheroids that subjects to fusion and cell arrangement to resemble evolving tissues. Autonomous self-assembly depends on the cell as the fundamental driver of histogenesis, guiding the building blocks, structural and functional properties of these tissues. It demands a deeper understanding of how embryonic tissues mechanisms develop as well as the microenvironment surrounded to create the bioprinted tissues.

=== Mini-tissue ===
The third approach of bioprinting is a combination of both the biomimicry and self-assembly approaches, called mini tissues. Organs and tissues are built from very small functional components. The mini-tissue approach takes these small pieces and arrange them into larger framework.

== Classification of bioprinters ==
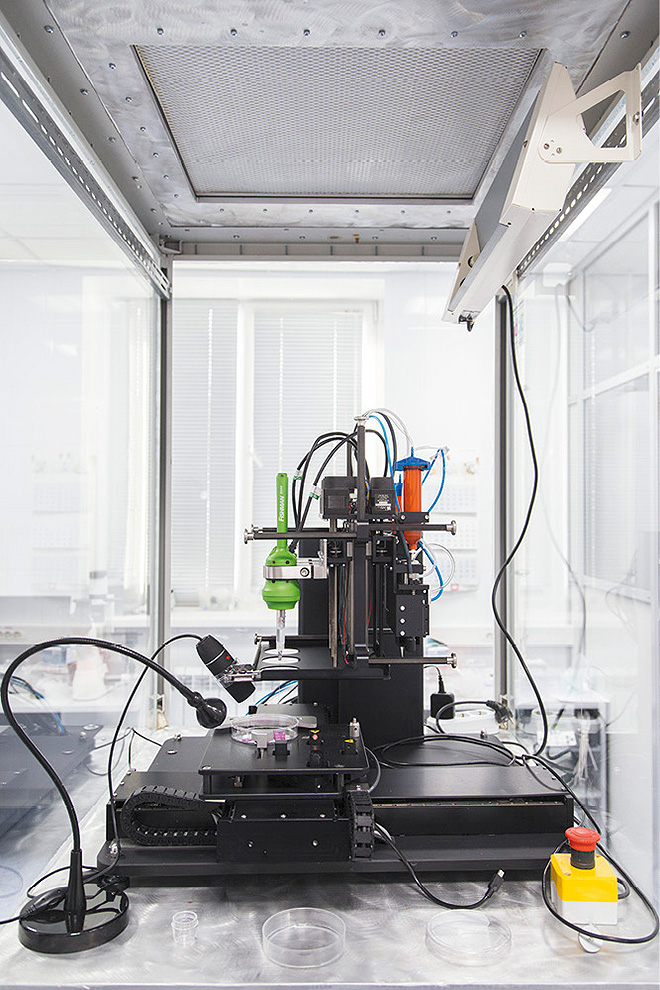
A 3D bioprinter

Akin to ordinary ink printers, bioprinters have three major components to them. These are the hardware used, the type of bio-ink, and the material it is printed on (biomaterials). Bio-ink is a material made from living cells that behaves much like a liquid, allowing people to 'print' it in order to create the desired shape. To make bio-ink, scientists create a slurry of cells that can be loaded into a cartridge and inserted into a specially designed printer, along with another cartridge containing a gel known as bio-paper. In bioprinting, there are three major types of printers that have been used. These are inkjet, laser-assisted, and extrusion printers. Inkjet printers are mainly used in bioprinting for fast and large-scale products. One type of inkjet printer, called drop-on-demand inkjet printer, prints materials in exact amounts, minimizing cost and waste. Printers that use lasers provide high-resolution printing; however, these printers are often expensive. Extrusion printers print cells layer-by-layer, just like 3D printing to create 3D constructs. In addition to just cells, extrusion printers may also use hydrogels infused with cells.

=== Extrusion-based ===
Extrusion-based printing is a very common technique within the field of 3D printing which entails extruding, or forcing, a continuous stream of melted solid material or viscous liquid through a sort of orifice, often a nozzle or syringe. When it comes to extrusion based bioprinting, there are four main types of extrusion. These are pneumatic driven, piston driven, screw driven and eccentric screw driven (also known as progressing cavity pump). Each extrusion method has its own advantages and disadvantages. Pneumatic extrusion uses pressurized air to force liquid bioink through a depositing agent. Air filters are commonly used to sterilize the air before it is used, to ensure air pushing the bioink is not contaminated. Piston driven extrusion uses a piston connected to a guide screw. The linear motion of the piston squeezes material out of the nozzle. Screw driven extrusion uses an auger screw to extrude material using rotational motion. Screw driven devices allow for the use of higher viscosity materials and provide more volumetric control. Eccentric screw driven systems allow for a much more precise deposition of low to high viscosity materials due to the self-sealing chambers in the extruder. Once printed, many materials require a crosslinking step to achieve the desired mechanical properties for the construct, which can be achieved for example with the treatment of chemical agents or photo-crosslinkers.

Direct extrusion is one of the most common extrusion-based bioprinting techniques, wherein the pressurized force directs the bioink to flow out of the nozzle, and directly print the scaffold without any necessary casting. The bioink itself for this approach can be a blend of polymer hydrogels, naturally derived materials such as collagen, and live cells suspended in the solution. In this manner, scaffolds can be cultured post-print and without the need for further treatment for cellular seeding. Some focus in the use of direct printing techniques is based upon the use of coaxial nozzle assemblies, or coaxial extrusion. The coaxial nozzle setup enables the simultaneous extrusion of multiple material bioinks, capable of making multi-layered scaffolds in a single extrusion step. The development of tubular structures has found the layered extrusion achieved via these techniques desirable for the radial variability in material characterization that it can offer, as the coaxial nozzle provides an inner and outer tube for bioink flow. Indirect extrusion techniques for bioprinting rather require the printing of a base material of cell-laden hydrogels, but unlike direct extrusion contains a sacrificial hydrogel that can be trivially removed post-printing through thermal or chemical extraction. The remaining resin solidifies and becomes the desired 3D-printed construct.

=== Laser-based ===
Laser-based bioprinting can be split into two major classes: those based on cell transfer technologies or photo-polymerization. In cell transfer laser printing, a laser stimulates the connection between energy-absorbing material (e.g. gold, titanium, etc.) and the bioink. This 'donor layer' vaporizes under the laser's irradiation, forming a bubble from the bioink layer which gets deposited from a jet. Photo-polymerization techniques rather use photoinitiated reactions to solidify the ink, moving the beam path of a laser to induce the formation of a desired construct. Certain laser frequencies paired with photopolymerization reactions can be carried out without damaging cells in the material.

=== Fixed deposition modelling ===
In this form of printing, plastic residues are melted down and individual layered in sections to create a desired shape. Nylon and PVA are examples of biomaterials used in this method. This technique is most often used to design prototypes for prosthetics and cartilage construction.

=== Inkjet ===
Another form of bioprinting involves an inkjet printer, which is primarily used in biomedical settings. This method prints detailed proteins and nucleic acids. Hydrogels are commonly selected as the bioink. Cells can be printed on to a selected surface media to proliferate and ultimately differentiate. A drawback of this printing method is the ability of the bioinks such as hydrogels to clog the printing nozzle, due to their high viscosity. Ideal inkjet bioprinting involves using a low polymer viscosity (ideally below 10 centipoise), low cell density (<10 million cells/mL), and low structural heights (<10 million cells/mL).

=== Additional printing methods ===
There are several other bioprinting techniques which are less commonly used. Droplet-based bioprinting is a technique in which the bioink blend of cells and/or hydrogels are placed in droplets in precise positions. Most common amongst this approach are thermal and piezoelectric-drop-on-demand techniques. This method of bioprinting is often used experimentally with lung and ovarian cancer models. Thermal technologies use short duration signals to heat the bioink, inducing the formation of small bubbles which are ejected. Piezoelectric bioprinting has short duration current applied to a piezoelectric actuator, which induces a mechanical vibration capable of ejecting a small globule of bioink through the nozzle. A significant aspect of the study of droplet-based approaches to bioprinting is accounting for mechanical and thermal stress cells within the bioink experience near the nozzle-tip as they are extruded.

Types of bioprinters
Method of bioprinting	Mode of printing	Advantages
Direct printing	Extrusion-based	Simple execution, no casting
Coaxial extrusion	Extrusion-based	Single step formation of multi-layered constructs
Indirect	Extrusion-based	Requires a removeable 'sacrificial material' to support structural formation
Laser	Laser-based	No shear stress upon cells suspended in ink
Droplet	Droplet-based	Precise control over flow and formation of scaffold

== Significance of bioink selection ==
Bioinks are essential components of the bioprinting process. They are composed of living cells and enzymatic supplements to nurture an environment that supports the biological needs of the printed tissue. The environment created by the bioink allows for the cell to attach, grow, and differentiate into its adult form. Cell-encapsualting hydrogels are used in extrusion based bioprinting methods, while gelatin MethacryloylGelatin methacrylon (GelMA) and acellular comprised bioinks are most often used in tissue engineering techniques that require cross-linkage and precise structural integrity. It is essential for bioinks to help replicate the external cellular matrix environment that the cell would naturally occur in.

== Applications ==
=== Tissue engineering ===
3D bioprinting can be used to reconstruct tissue from various regions of the body. The precursor to the adoption of 3D printing in healthcare was a series of trials conducted by researchers at Boston Children's Hospital. The team built replacement urinary bladders by hand for seven patients by constructing scaffolds, then layering the scaffolds with cells from the patients and allowing them to grow. The trials were a success as the patients remained in good health 7 years after implantation, which led a research fellow named Anthony Atala, MD, to search for ways to automate the process. Patients with end-stage bladder disease can now be treated by using bio-engineered bladder tissues to rebuild the damaged organ. This technology can also potentially be applied to bone, skin, cartilage and muscle tissue. Though one long-term goal of 3D bioprinting technology is to reconstruct an entire organ as well as minimize the problem of the lack of organs for transplantation. There has been little success in bioprinting of fully functional organs e.g. liver, skin, meniscus or pancreas. Unlike implantable stents, organs have complex shapes and are significantly harder to bioprint. A bioprinted heart, for example, must not only meet structural requirements, but also vascularization, mechanical load, and electrical signal propagation requirements. In 2022, the first success of a clinical trial for a 3D bioprinted transplant that is made from the patient's own cells, an external ear to treat microtia, was reported. The limitations of 3D bioprinting are associated with physiologically irrelevant morphology and unsuccessful histological evaluation methods.

3D bioprinting contributes to significant advances in the medical field of tissue engineering by allowing for research to be done on innovative materials called biomaterials. Some of the most notable bioengineered substances are usually stronger than the average bodily materials, including soft tissue and bone. These constituents can act as future substitutes, even improvements, for the original body materials. In addition, the Defense Threat Reduction Agency aims to print mini organs such as hearts, livers, and lungs as the potential to test new drugs more accurately and perhaps eliminate the need for testing in animals.

=== Cultured meat ===
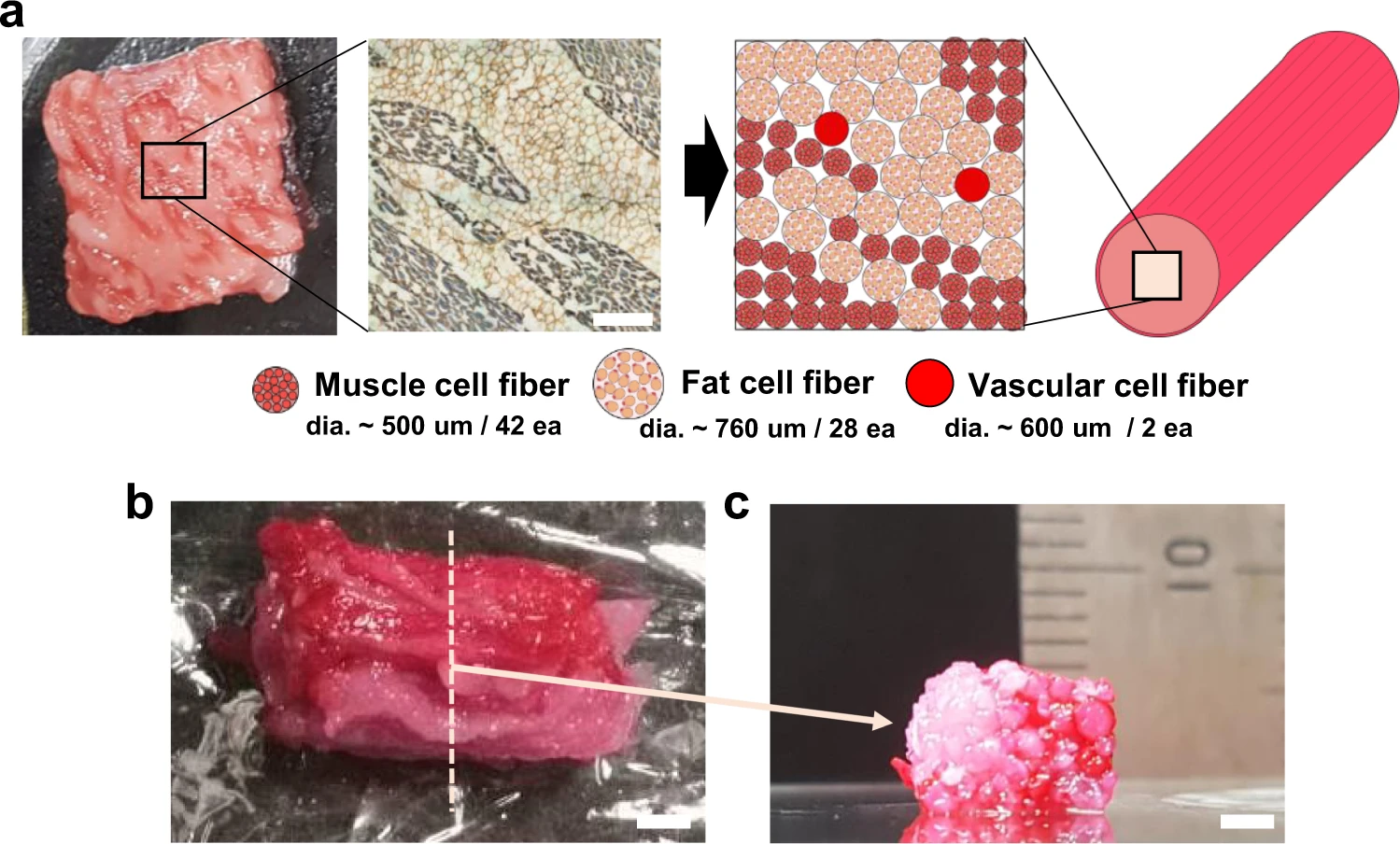
Such steak-like meat could mitigate issues of environmental impact of meat production and animal welfare.

Bioprinting can also be used for cultured meat. In 2021, a steak-like cultured meat, composed of three types of bovine cell fibers was produced. The Wagyu-like beef has a structure similar to original meat. This technology provides an alternative to natural meat harvesting methods if the livestock industry is plagued by disease. In addition, it provides a possible solution to reducing the environmental impact of the livestock industry.

=== Bioremediation ===
Bioremediation uses microorganisms or in recent times, materials of biological origin, such as enzymes, biocomposites, biopolymers, or nanoparticles, to biochemically degrade contaminants into harmless substances, making it an environmentally friendly and cost-effective alternative; 3D bioprinting facilitates the fabrication of functional structures using these materials that enhance bioremediation processes leading to a significant interest in the application of 3D bioprinted constructs in improving bioremediation.

==== Biofilms ====
The bioprinting of biofilms uses the same methods as other bioprinting. Oftentimes, the biofilm begins with an extrusion of a polysaccharide to provide structure for biofilm growth. An example of one of these polysaccharides is alginate. The alginate structure can have microbes embedded within the structure. Hydrogels can also be used to assist in the formation of functional biofilms. Biofilms are difficult to analyze in a laboratory setting due to the complex structure and the time it takes for a functional biofilm to form. 3D bioprinting biofilms allows us to skip certain processes and makes it easier to analyze functional biofilms. Thickness of the biofilm being printed with change the functionality due to nutrient and oxygen diffusion. Thicker 3D printed biofilms will naturally select for anaerobes for example.

Biofilms are capable of remediation in the natural environment which suggests there is potential in regards to the use of 3D bioprinted biofilm use in environmental remediation. Microbes are able to degrade a large range of chemicals and metals and providing a structure for these microbes to flourish such as in biofilm structures is beneficial. Artificial biofilms protect the microbes from the dangers of the environment while promoting signaling and overall microbial interactions. 3D bioprinting allows functional microorganisms to be placed in structures that provide mechanical stability and protects them from environmental conditions. The larger contact area provided by 3D printed structures compared to normal environmental structures provides more efficient removal of pollutants.

==== Future uses ====
Bioprinting also has possible uses in the future in assisting in wastewater treatment and in corrosion control. When humans come in contact with environmental biofilms, it is possible for infections and long-term health hazards to occur. Antibiotic penetration and expansion within a biofilm is an area of research which can benefit from bioprinting techniques, to further explore the effect of environmental biofilms on human health. Biofilm printing requires further research due to limited published data and complex protocols.

== See also ==
- 3D printing § Bio-printing
- Biofabrication
- Cultured meat
- Ethics of bioprinting
- Regenerative medicine
- Bioinks
