= Tissue engineering =

Biomedical engineering discipline

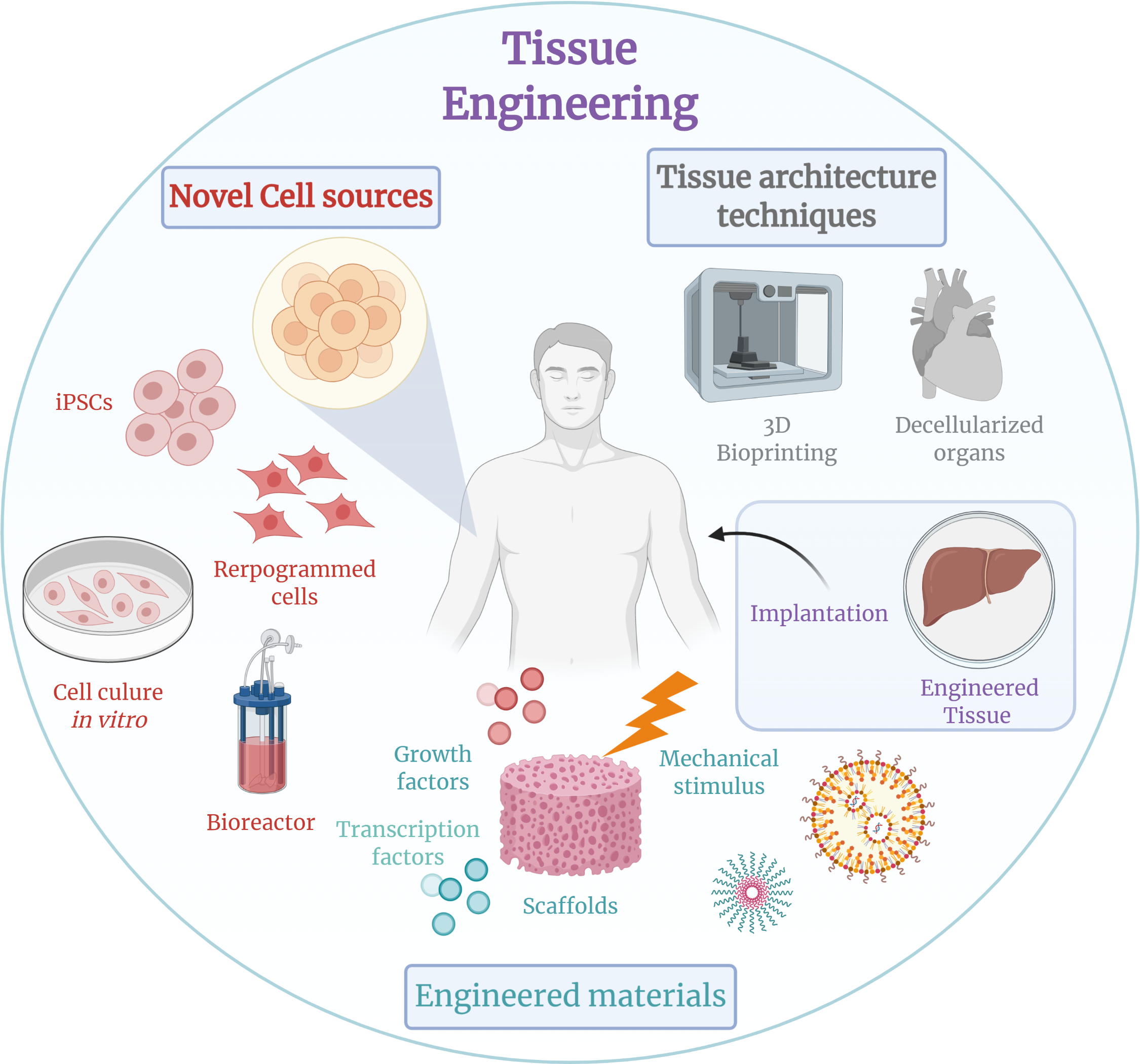
Throughout the past decade in the field of tissue engineering, novel cell sources, engineering materials, and tissue architecture techniques have provided engineering tissues that better restore, maintain, improve, or replace biological tissues.

Tissue engineering is a biomedical engineering discipline that uses a combination of cells, engineering, materials methods, and suitable biochemical and physicochemical factors to restore, maintain, improve, or replace different types of biological tissues. Tissue engineering often involves the use of cells placed on tissue scaffolds in the formation of new viable tissue for a medical purpose, but is not limited to applications involving cells and tissue scaffolds. While it was once categorized as a sub-field of biomaterials, having grown in scope and importance, it can be considered as a field of its own.

What tissue engineering is and how it works

While most definitions of tissue engineering cover a broad range of applications, in practice, the term is closely associated with applications that repair or replace portions of or whole tissues (i.e. organs, bone, cartilage, blood vessels, bladder, skin, muscle etc.). Often, the tissues involved require certain mechanical and structural properties for proper functioning. The term has also been applied to efforts to perform specific biochemical functions using cells within an artificially created support system (e.g. an artificial pancreas, or a bio artificial liver). The term regenerative medicine is often used synonymously with tissue engineering, although those involved in regenerative medicine place more emphasis on the use of stem cells or progenitor cells to produce tissues.

== Overview ==
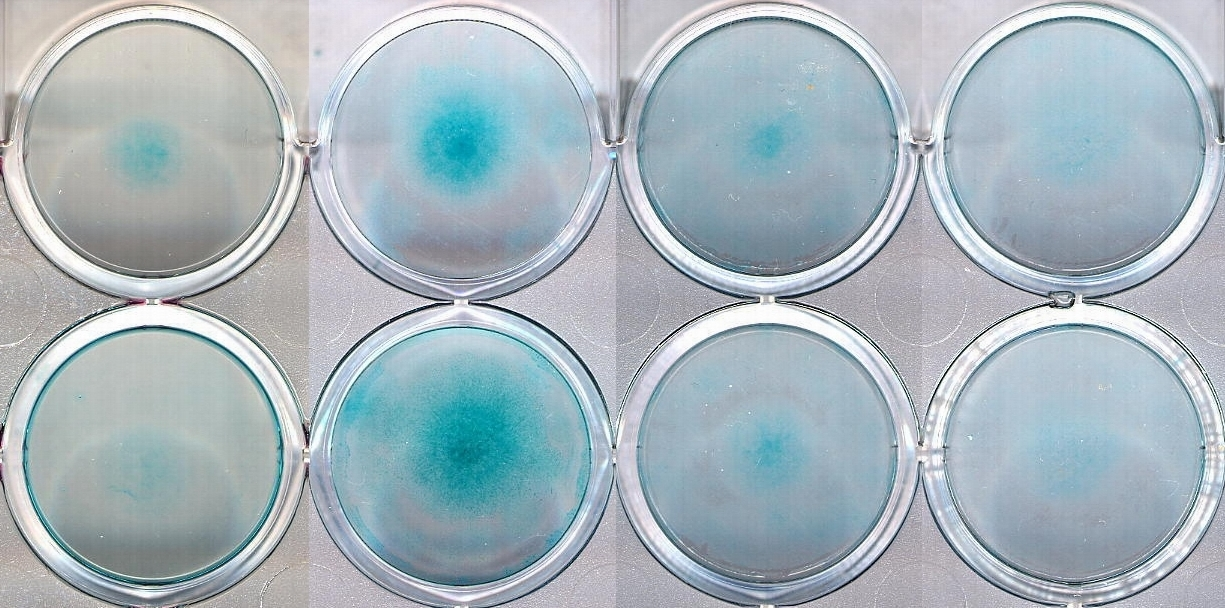
Micro-mass cultures of C3H-10T1/2 cells at varied oxygen tensions stained with Alcian blue

A commonly applied definition of tissue engineering, as stated by Robert Langer and Joseph P. Vacanti, is "an interdisciplinary field that applies the principles of engineering and life sciences toward the development of biological substitutes that restore, maintain, or improve Biological tissue function or a whole organ". In addition, Langer and Vacanti also state that there are three main types of tissue engineering: cells, tissue-inducing substances, and a cells + matrix approach (often referred to as a scaffold). Tissue engineering has also been defined as "understanding the principles of tissue growth, and applying this to produce functional replacement tissue for clinical use". A further description goes on to say that an "underlying supposition of tissue engineering is that the employment of natural biology of the system will allow for greater success in developing therapeutic strategies aimed at the replacement, repair, maintenance, or enhancement of tissue function".

Developments in the multidisciplinary field of tissue engineering have yielded a novel set of tissue replacement parts and implementation strategies. Scientific advances in biomaterials, stem cells, growth and differentiation factors, and biomimetic environments have created opportunities to fabricate or improve existing tissues in the laboratory from combinations of engineered extracellular matrices ("scaffolds"), cells, and biologically active molecules. Among the major challenges now facing tissue engineering is the need for more complex functionality, biomechanical stability, and vascularization in laboratory-grown tissues destined for transplantation.

== Etymology ==
The historical origin of the term is unclear as the definition of the word has changed throughout the past few decades. The term first appeared in a 1984 publication that described the organization of an endothelium-like membrane on the surface of a long-implanted, synthetic ophthalmic prosthesis.

The first modern use of the term as recognized today was in 1985 by the researcher, physiologist and bioengineer Yuan-Cheng Fung of the Engineering Research Center. He proposed the joining of the terms tissue (in reference to the fundamental relationship between cells and organs) and engineering (in reference to the field of modification of said tissues). The term was officially adopted in 1987.

== History ==
=== Ancient era (pre-17th century) ===
An understanding of the inner workings of human tissues may date back further than most would expect. As early as the Neolithic period, sutures were being used to close wounds and aid in healing. Later on, societies such as ancient Egypt developed better materials for sewing up wounds such as linen sutures. Around 2500 BC in ancient India, skin grafts were developed by cutting skin from the buttock and suturing it to wound sites in the ear, nose, or lips. Ancient Egyptians often would graft skin from corpses onto living humans and even attempted to use honey as a type of antibiotic and grease as a protective barrier to prevent infection. In the 1st and 2nd centuries AD, Gallo-Romans developed wrought iron implants and dental implants could be found in ancient Mayans.

=== Enlightenment (17th century–19th century) ===
While these ancient societies had developed techniques that were ahead of their time, they still lacked a mechanistic understanding of how the body was reacting to these procedures. This mechanistic approach came along in tandem with the development of the empirical method of science pioneered by René Descartes.

In the 17th century, Robert Hooke discovered the cell and a letter from Benedict de Spinoza brought forward the idea of the homeostasis between the dynamic processes in the body. Hydra experiments performed by Abraham Trembley in the 18th century began to delve into the regenerative capabilities of cells. During the 19th century, a better understanding of how different metals reacted with the body led to the development of better sutures and a shift towards screw and plate implants in bone fixation. Further, it was first hypothesized in the mid-1800s that cell-environment interactions and cell proliferation were vital for tissue regeneration.

=== Modern era (20th and 21st centuries) ===
As time progresses and technology advances, there is a constant need for change in the approach researchers take in their studies. Tissue engineering has continued to evolve over centuries. Tissue engineers have the ability to remake many of the tissues in the body through the use of modern techniques such as microfabrication and three-dimensional bioprinting in conjunction with native tissue cells/stem cells. These advances have allowed researchers to generate new tissues in a much more efficient manner. For example, these techniques allow for more personalization which allow for better biocompatibility, decreased immune response, cellular integration, and longevity. There is no doubt that these techniques will continue to evolve, as we have continued to see microfabrication and bioprinting evolve over the past decade.

In 1960, Otto Wichterle and Drahoslav Lím were the first to publish experiments on hydrogels for biomedical applications by using them in contact lens construction. Work on the field developed slowly over the next two decades, but later found traction when hydrogels were repurposed for drug delivery. In 1984, Charles Hull developed bioprinting by converting a Hewlett-Packard inkjet printer into a device capable of depositing cells in 2D. 3D printing is a type of additive manufacturing which has since found various applications in medical engineering, due to its high precision and efficiency. With James Thomson's development of first human stem cell lines in 1998 followed by transplantation of first laboratory-grown internal organs in 1999 and creation of the first bioprinter in 2003 by the University of Missouri when they printed spheroids without the need of scaffolds, 3D bioprinting became more conventionally used in medical field than ever before. So far, scientists have been able to print mini organoids and organs-on-chips that have rendered practical insights into the functions of a human body. Pharmaceutical companies are using these models to test drugs before moving on to animal studies. A fully functional and structurally similar organ has not been printed yet. A team at the University of Utah has reportedly printed ears and successfully transplanted those onto children born with defects that left their ears partially developed.

Today, hydrogels are the preferred choice of bio-inks for 3D bioprinting since they mimic cells' natural ECM while also containing strong mechanical properties capable of sustaining 3D structures. Furthermore, hydrogels in conjunction with 3D bioprinting allow researchers to produce different scaffolds which can be used to form new tissues or organs. 3D printed tissues still face many challenges such as adding vasculature.

Among the hydrogels, Festigel, a thermo-reversible gelation polymer group of scaffolds have been reported with in vitro tissue engineering and in vivo wound healing efficiency in urethral stricture, periodontal regeneration beside holding potentials in transportation of tissues and cells. As a bioinert carrier of cell transplant, in periodontally accelerated osteogenic orthodontics, dental pulp stem cells encapsulated in Festigel and transplanted have been reported enhancing alveolar bone thickness with a faster healing.

== Examples ==
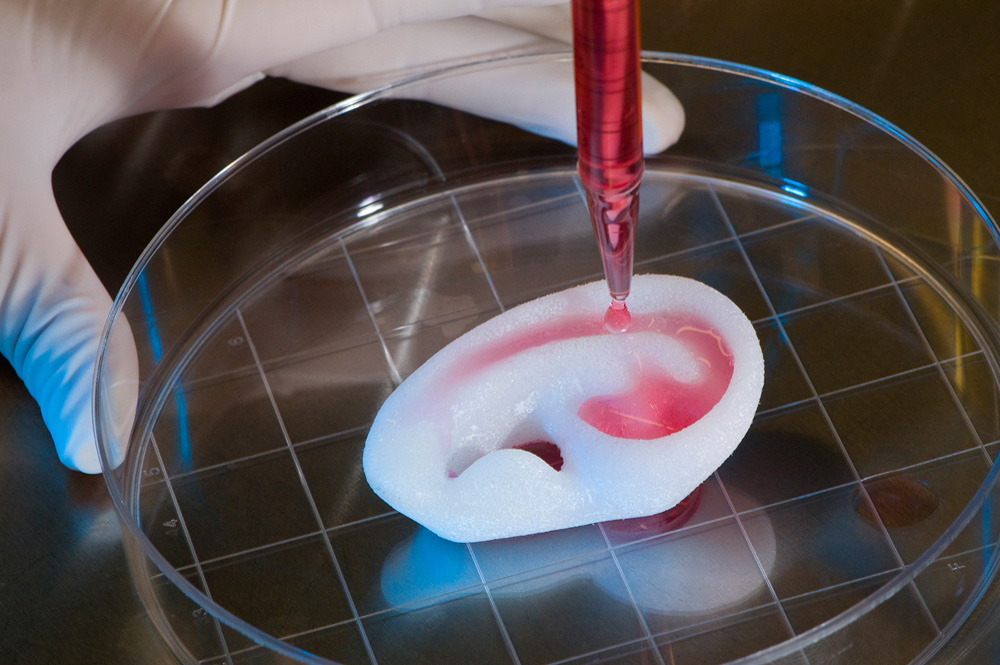
Regenerating a human ear using a scaffold

As defined by Langer and Vacanti, examples of tissue engineering fall into one or more of three categories: "just cells," "cells and scaffold," or "tissue-inducing factors."

- In vitro meat: Edible artificial animal muscle tissue cultured in vitro.
- Bioartificial liver device, "Temporary Liver", Extracorporeal Liver Assist Device (ELAD): The human hepatocyte cell line (C3A line) in a hollow fiber bioreactor can mimic the hepatic function of the liver for acute instances of liver failure. A fully capable ELAD would temporarily function as an individual's liver, thus avoiding transplantation and allowing regeneration of their own liver.
- Artificial pancreas: Research involves using islet cells to regulate the body's blood sugar, particularly in cases of diabetes. Biochemical factors may be used to cause human pluripotent stem cells to differentiate (turn into) cells that function similarly to beta cells, which are in an islet cell in charge of producing insulin.
- Artificial bladders: Anthony Atala (Wake Forest University) has successfully implanted artificial bladders, constructed of cultured cells seeded onto a bladder-shaped scaffold, into seven out of approximately 20 human test subjects as part of a long-term experiment.
- Cartilage: lab-grown cartilage, cultured in vitro on a scaffold, was successfully used as an autologous transplant to repair patients' knees.
- Scaffold-free cartilage: Cartilage generated without the use of exogenous scaffold material. In this methodology, all material in the construct is cellular produced directly by the cells.
- Bioartificial heart: Doris Taylor's lab constructed a biocompatible rat heart by re-cellularising a de-cellularised rat heart. This scaffold and cells were placed in a bioreactor, where it matured to become a partially or fully transplantable organ. The work was called a "landmark". The lab first stripped the cells away from a rat heart (a process called "decellularization") and then injected rat stem cells into the decellularized rat heart.
- Tissue-engineered blood vessels: Blood vessels that have been grown in a lab and can be used to repair damaged blood vessels without eliciting an immune response. Tissue engineered blood vessels have been developed by many different approaches. They could be implanted as pre-seeded cellularized blood vessels, as acellular vascular grafts made with decellularized vessels or synthetic vascular grafts.
- Artificial skin constructed from human skin cells embedded in a hydrogel, such as in the case of bio-printed constructs for battlefield burn repairs.
- Artificial bone marrow: Bone marrow cultured in vitro to be transplanted serves as a "just cells" approach to tissue engineering.
- Tissue engineered bone: A structural matrix can be composed of metals such as titanium, polymers of varying degradation rates, or certain types of ceramics. Materials are often chosen to recruit osteoblasts to aid in reforming the bone and returning biological function. Various types of cells can be added directly into the matrix to expedite the process.
- Laboratory-grown penis: Decellularized scaffolds of rabbit penises were recellularised with smooth muscle and endothelial cells. The organ was then transplanted to live rabbits and functioned comparably to the native organ, suggesting potential as treatment for genital trauma.
- Oral mucosa tissue engineering uses a cells and scaffold approach to replicate the 3 dimensional structure and function of oral mucosa.

== Cells as building blocks ==
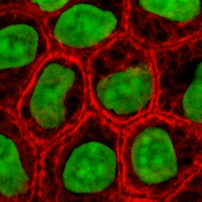
Stained cells in culture

Cells are one of the main components for the success of tissue engineering approaches. Tissue engineering uses cells as strategies for creation/replacement of new tissue. Examples include fibroblasts used for skin repair or renewal, chondrocytes used for cartilage repair (MACI–FDA approved product), and hepatocytes used in liver support systems.

Cells can be used alone or with support matrices for tissue engineering applications. An adequate environment for promoting cell growth, differentiation, and integration with the existing tissue is a critical factor for cell-based building blocks. Manipulation of any of these cell processes create alternative avenues for the development of new tissue (e.g., cell reprogramming - somatic cells, vascularization).

=== Isolation ===
Techniques for cell isolation depend on the cell source. Centrifugation and apheresis are techniques used for extracting cells from biofluids (e.g., blood). Whereas digestion processes, typically using enzymes to remove the extracellular matrix (ECM), are required prior to centrifugation or apheresis techniques to extract cells from tissues/organs. Trypsin and collagenase are the most common enzymes used for tissue digestion. While trypsin is temperature dependent, collagenase is less sensitive to changes in temperature.

=== Cell sources ===
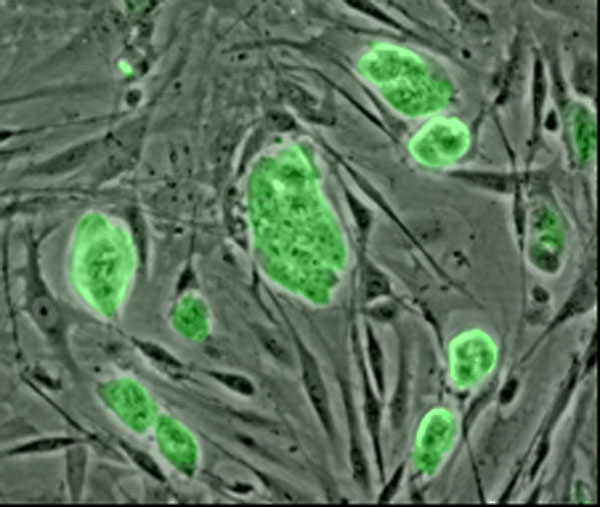
Mouse embryonic stem cells

Primary cells are those directly isolated from host tissue. These cells provide an ex-vivo model of cell behavior without any genetic, epigenetic, or developmental changes; making them a closer replication of in-vivo conditions than cells derived from other methods. This constraint however, can also make studying them difficult. These are mature cells, often terminally differentiated, meaning that for many cell types proliferation is difficult or impossible. Additionally, the microenvironments these cells exist in are highly specialized, often making replication of these conditions difficult.

Secondary cells are a portion of cells from a primary culture is moved to a new repository/vessel to continue being cultured. Medium from the primary culture is removed, the cells that are desired to be transferred are obtained, and then cultured in a new vessel with fresh growth medium. A secondary cell culture is useful in order to ensure that cells have both the room and nutrients that they require to grow. Secondary cultures are most notably used in any scenario in which a larger quantity of cells than can be found in the primary culture is desired. Secondary cells share the constraints of primary cells (see above) but have an added risk of contamination when transferring to a new vessel.

=== Genetic classifications of cells ===
Autologous: The donor and the recipient of the cells are the same individual. Cells are harvested, cultured or stored, and then reintroduced to the host. As a result of the host's own cells being reintroduced, an antigenic response is not elicited. The body's immune system recognizes these re-implanted cells as its own, and does not target them for attack. Autologous cell dependence on host cell health and donor site morbidity may be deterrents to their use. Adipose-derived and bone marrow-derived mesenchymal stem cells are commonly autologous in nature, and can be used in a myriad of ways, from helping repair skeletal tissue to replenishing beta cells in diabetic patients.

Allogenic: Cells are obtained from the body of a donor of the same species as the recipient. While there are some ethical constraints to the use of human cells for in vitro studies (i.e. human brain tissue chimera development), the employment of dermal fibroblasts from human foreskin demonstrates an immunologically safe and thus a viable choice for allogenic tissue engineering of the skin.

Xenogenic: These cells are derived isolated cells from alternate species from the recipient. A notable example of xenogeneic tissue utilization is cardiovascular implant construction via animal cells. Chimeric human-animal farming raises ethical concerns around the potential for improved consciousness from implanting human organs in animals.

Syngeneic or isogenic: These cells describe those borne from identical genetic code. This imparts an immunologic benefit similar to autologous cell lines (see above). Autologous cells can be considered syngenic, but the classification also extends to non-autologously derived cells such as those from an identical twin, from genetically identical (cloned) research models, or induced stem cells (iSC) as related to the donor.

=== Stem cells ===
Stem cells are undifferentiated cells with the ability to divide in culture and give rise to different forms of specialized cells. Stem cells are divided into "adult" and "embryonic" stem cells according to their source. While there is still a large ethical debate related to the use of embryonic stem cells, it is thought that another alternative source – induced pluripotent stem cells – may be useful for the repair of diseased or damaged tissues, or may be used to grow new organs.

Totipotent cells are stem cells which can divide into further stem cells or differentiate into any cell type in the body, including extra-embryonic tissue.

Pluripotent cells are stem cells which can differentiate into any cell type in the body except extra-embryonic tissue. induced pluripotent stem cells (iPSCs) are subclass of pluripotent stem cells resembling embryonic stem cells (ESCs) that have been derived from adult differentiated cells. iPSCs are created by altering the expression of transcriptional factors in adult cells until they become like embryonic stem cells.

Multipotent stem cells can be differentiated into any cell within the same class, such as blood or bone. A common example of multipotent cells is Mesenchymal stem cells (MSCs).

== Scaffolds ==
Scaffolds are materials that have been engineered to cause desirable cellular interactions to contribute to the formation of new functional tissues for medical purposes. Cells are often 'seeded' into these structures capable of supporting three-dimensional tissue formation. Scaffolds mimic the extracellular matrix of the native tissue, recapitulating the in vivo milieu and allowing cells to influence their own microenvironments. They usually serve at least one of the following purposes: allowing cell attachment and migration, delivering and retaining cells and biochemical factors, enabling diffusion of vital cell nutrients and expressed products, and exerting certain mechanical and biological influences to modify the behaviour of the cell phase.

In 2009, an interdisciplinary team led by the thoracic surgeon Thorsten Walles implanted the first bioartificial transplant that provides an innate vascular network for post-transplant graft supply successfully into a patient awaiting tracheal reconstruction.

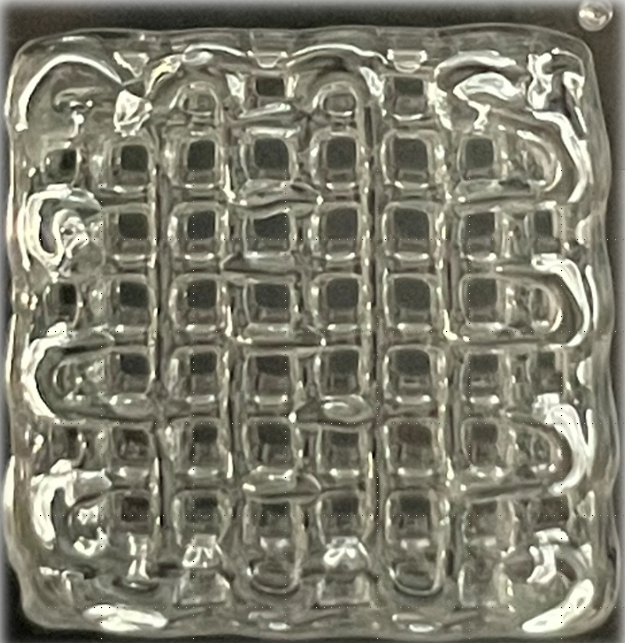
3D printed Hydrogel Scaffold

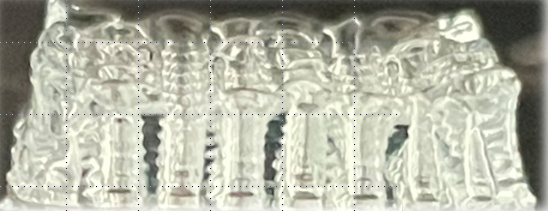
3D printed Hydrogel Scaffold: side view

To achieve the goal of tissue reconstruction, scaffolds must meet some specific requirements. High porosity and adequate pore size are necessary to facilitate cell seeding and diffusion throughout the whole structure of both cells and nutrients.

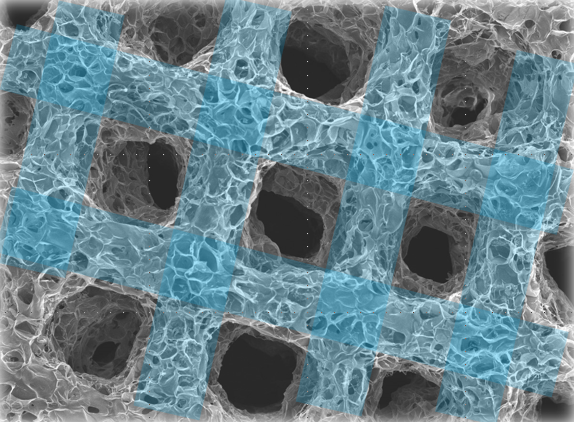
SEM image of Lyophilized Hydrogel Scaffold

Biodegradability is often an essential factor since scaffolds should preferably be absorbed by the surrounding tissues without the necessity of surgical removal. The rate at which degradation occurs has to coincide as much as possible with the rate of tissue formation: this means that while cells are fabricating their own natural matrix structure around themselves, the scaffold is able to provide structural integrity within the body and eventually it will break down leaving the newly formed tissue which will take over the mechanical load. Injectability is also important for clinical uses. Recent research on organ printing is showing how crucial a good control of the 3D environment is to ensure reproducibility of experiments and offer better results.

=== Materials ===
Material selection is an essential aspect of producing a scaffold. The materials utilized can be natural or synthetic and can be biodegradable or non-biodegradable. Additionally, they must be biocompatible, meaning that they do not cause any adverse effects to cells. Silicone, for example, is a synthetic, non-biodegradable material commonly used as a drug delivery material, while gelatin is a biodegradable, natural material commonly used in cell-culture scaffolds

The material needed for each application is different, and dependent on the desired mechanical properties of the material. Tissue engineering of long bone defects for example, will require a rigid scaffold with a compressive strength similar to that of cortical bone (100-150 MPa), which is much higher compared to a scaffold for skin regeneration.

There are a few versatile synthetic materials used for many different scaffold applications. One commonly used materials is polylactic acid (PLA), a polyester which degrades within the human body to form lactic acid, a naturally occurring chemical which is easily removed from the body. Similar materials are polyglycolic acid (PGA) and polycaprolactone (PCL); their degradation mechanism is similar to that of PLA, but PCL degrades slower and PGA degrades faster. PLA is commonly combined with PGA to create poly-lactic-co-glycolic acid (PLGA). This is useful because the degradation of PLGA can be tailored by altering the weight percentages of PLA and PGA: More PLA – slower degradation, more PGA – faster degradation. This tunability, along with its biocompatibility, makes it an extremely useful material for scaffold creation.

Scaffolds may also be constructed from natural materials: different derivatives of the extracellular matrix have been studied to evaluate their ability to support cell growth. Protein based materials – such as collagen, or fibrin, and polysaccharidic materials- like chitosan or glycosaminoglycans (GAGs), have all proved suitable in terms of cell compatibility. Among GAGs, hyaluronic acid, possibly in combination with cross linking agents (e.g. glutaraldehyde, water-soluble carbodiimide, etc.), is one of the possible choices as scaffold material. Due to the covalent attachment of thiol groups to these polymers, they can crosslink via disulfide bond formation. The use of thiolated polymers (thiomers) as scaffold material for tissue engineering was initially introduced at the 4th Central European Symposium on Pharmaceutical Technology in Vienna 2001. As thiomers are biocompatible, exhibit cellular mimicking properties and efficiently support proliferation and differentiation of various cell types, they are extensively used as scaffolds for tissue engineering. Furthermore, thiomers such as thiolated hyaluronic acid and thiolated chitosan were shown to exhibit wound healing properties and are subject of numerous clinical trials. Additionally, a fragment of an extracellular matrix protein, such as the RGD peptide, can be coupled to a non-bioactive material to promote cell attachment. Another form of scaffold is decellularized tissue. This is a process where chemicals are used to extracts cells from tissues, leaving just the extracellular matrix. This has the benefit of a fully formed matrix specific to the desired tissue type. However, the decellurised scaffold may present immune problems with future introduced cells.

=== Synthesis ===
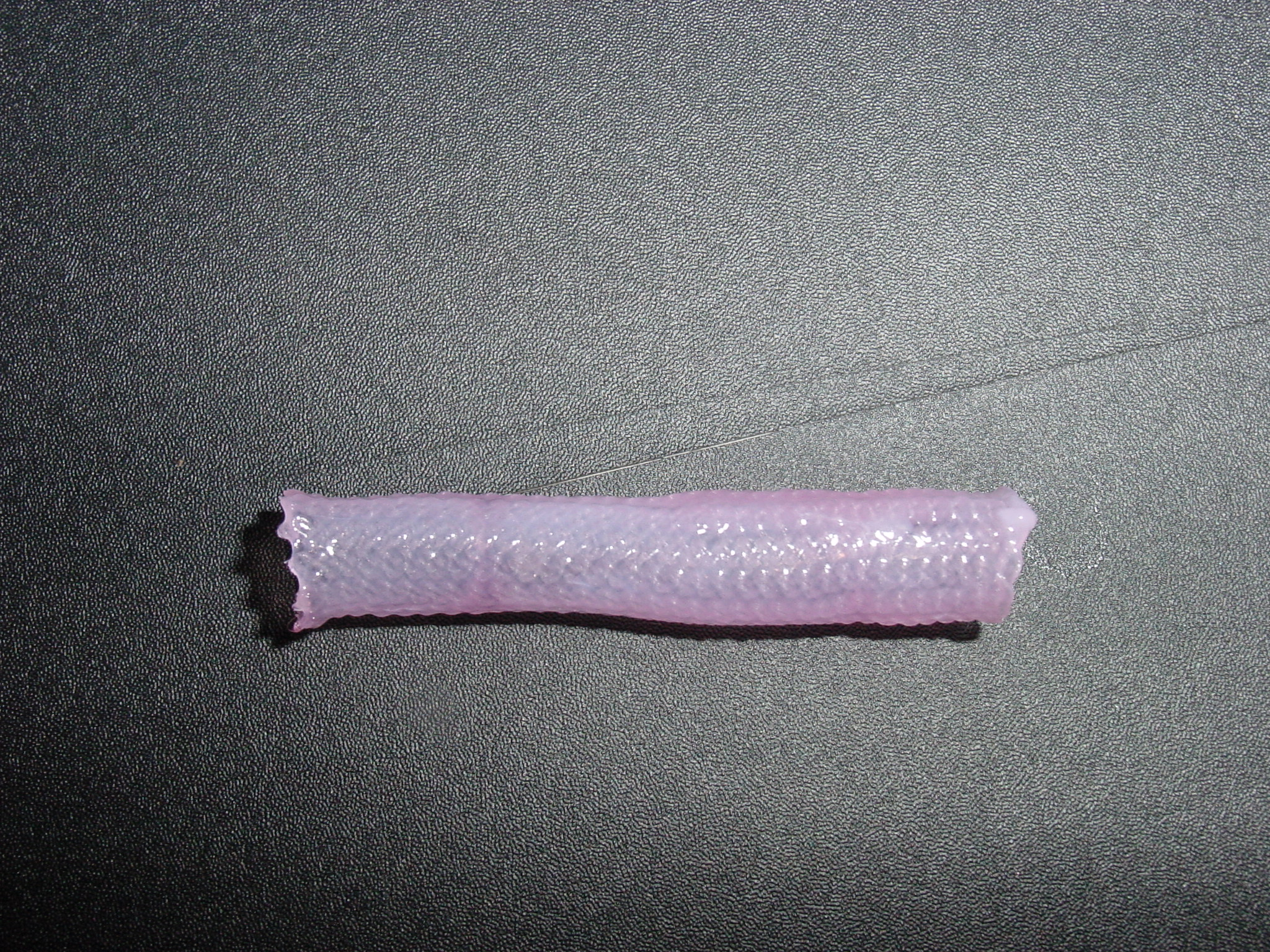
Tissue engineered vascular graft

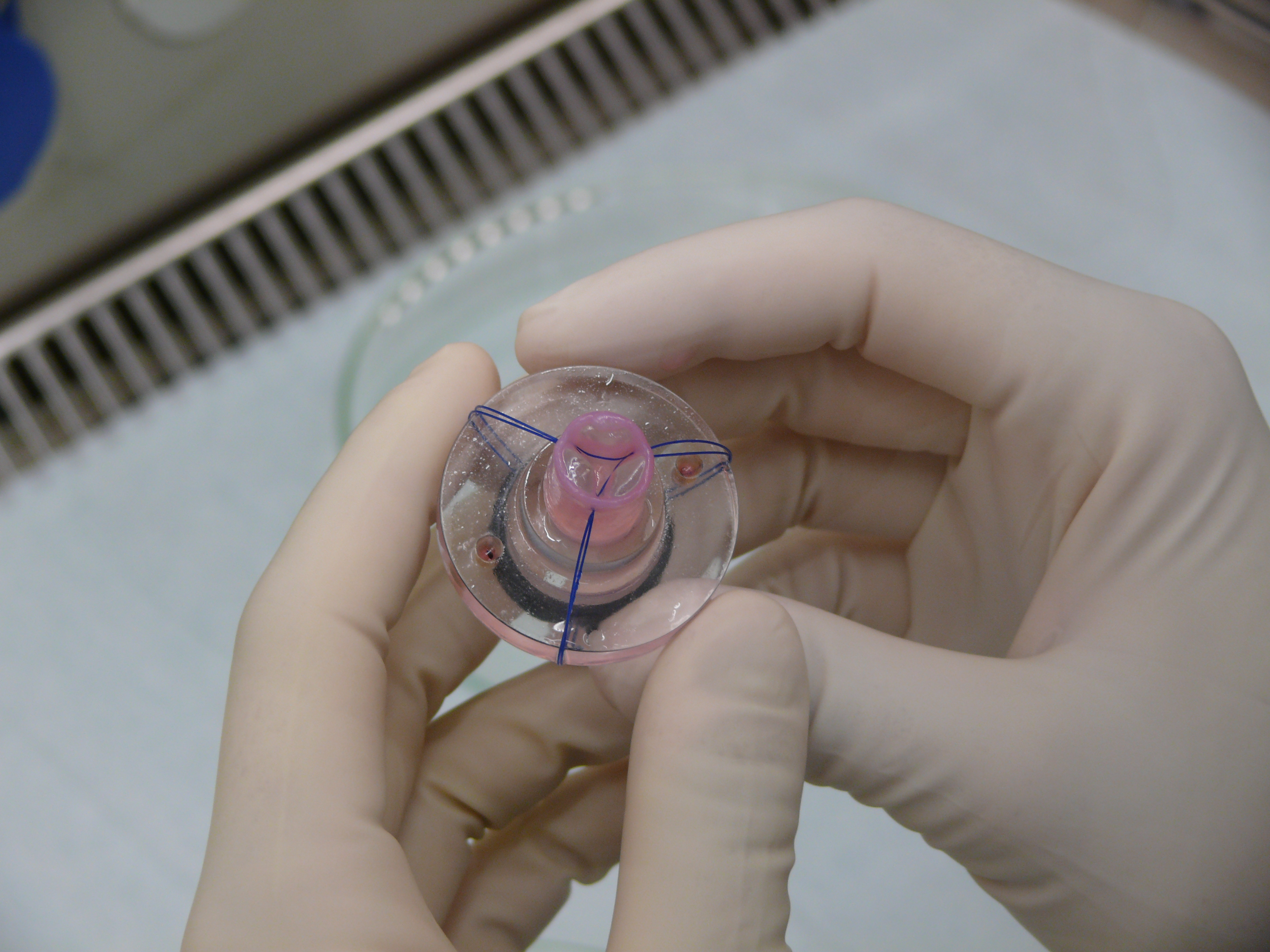
Tissue engineered heart valve

A number of different methods have been described in the literature for preparing porous structures to be employed as tissue engineering scaffolds. Each of these techniques presents its own advantages, but none are free of drawbacks.

==== Nanofiber self-assembly ====
Molecular self-assembly is one of the few methods for creating biomaterials with properties similar in scale and chemistry to that of the natural in vivo extracellular matrix (ECM), a crucial step toward tissue engineering of complex tissues. Moreover, these hydrogel scaffolds have shown superiority in in vivo toxicology and biocompatibility compared to traditional macro-scaffolds and animal-derived materials.

==== Textile technologies ====
These techniques include all the approaches that have been successfully employed for the preparation of non-woven meshes of different polymers. In particular, non-woven polyglycolide structures have been tested for tissue engineering applications: such fibrous structures have been found useful to grow different types of cells. The principal drawbacks are related to the difficulties in obtaining high porosity and regular pore size.

==== Solvent casting and particulate leaching ====
Solvent casting and particulate leaching (SCPL) allows for the preparation of structures with regular porosity, but with limited thickness. First, the polymer is dissolved into a suitable organic solvent (e.g. polylactic acid could be dissolved into dichloromethane), then the solution is cast into a mold filled with porogen particles. Such porogen can be an inorganic salt like sodium chloride, crystals of saccharose, and gelatin or paraffin spheres. The size of the porogen particles will affect the size of the scaffold pores, while the polymer to porogen ratio is directly correlated to the amount of porosity of the final structure. After the polymer solution has been cast the solvent is allowed to fully evaporate, then the composite structure in the mold is immersed in a bath of a liquid suitable for dissolving the porogen: water in the case of sodium chloride, saccharose and gelatin or an aliphatic solvent like hexane for use with paraffin. Once the porogen has been fully dissolved, a porous structure is obtained. Other than the small thickness range that can be obtained, another drawback of SCPL lies in its use of organic solvents which must be fully removed to avoid any possible damage to the cells seeded on the scaffold.

==== Gas foaming ====
To overcome the need to use organic solvents and solid porogens, a technique using gas as a porogen has been developed. First, disc-shaped structures made of the desired polymer are prepared by means of compression molding using a heated mold. The discs are then placed in a chamber where they are exposed to high pressure CO_{2} for several days. The pressure inside the chamber is gradually restored to atmospheric levels. During this procedure, the pores are formed by the carbon dioxide molecules that abandon the polymer, resulting in a sponge-like structure. The main problems resulting from such a technique are caused by the excessive heat used during compression molding (which prohibits the incorporation of any temperature labile material into the polymer matrix) and by the fact that the pores do not form an interconnected structure.

==== Emulsification freeze-drying ====
This technique does not require the use of a solid porogen like SCPL. First, a synthetic polymer is dissolved into a suitable solvent (e.g. polylactic acid in dichloromethane) then water is added to the polymeric solution and the two liquids are mixed in order to obtain an emulsion. Before the two phases can separate, the emulsion is cast into a mold and quickly frozen by means of immersion into liquid nitrogen. The frozen emulsion is subsequently freeze-dried to remove the dispersed water and the solvent, thus leaving a solidified, porous polymeric structure. While emulsification and freeze-drying allow for a faster preparation when compared to SCPL (since it does not require a time-consuming leaching step), it still requires the use of solvents. Moreover, pore size is relatively small and porosity is often irregular. Freeze-drying by itself is also a commonly employed technique for the fabrication of scaffolds. In particular, it is used to prepare collagen sponges: collagen is dissolved into acidic solutions of acetic acid or hydrochloric acid that are cast into a mold, frozen with liquid nitrogen and then lyophilized.

==== Thermally induced phase separation ====
Similar to the previous technique, the TIPS phase separation procedure requires the use of a solvent with a low melting point that is easy to sublime. For example, dioxane could be used to dissolve polylactic acid, then phase separation is induced through the addition of a small quantity of water: a polymer-rich and a polymer-poor phase are formed. Following cooling below the solvent melting point and some days of vacuum-drying to sublime the solvent, a porous scaffold is obtained. Liquid-liquid phase separation presents the same drawbacks of emulsification/freeze-drying.

==== Electrospinning ====
Electrospinning is a highly versatile technique that can be used to produce continuous fibers ranging in diameter from a few microns to a few nanometers. In a typical electrospinning set-up, the desired scaffold material is dissolved within a solvent and placed within a syringe. This solution is fed through a needle and a high voltage is applied to the tip and to a conductive collection surface. The buildup of electrostatic forces within the solution causes it to eject a thin fibrous stream towards the oppositely charged or grounded collection surface. During this process the solvent evaporates, leaving solid fibers leaving a highly porous network. This technique is highly tunable, with variation to solvent, voltage, working distance (distance from the needle to collection surface), flow rate of solution, solute concentration, and collection surface. This allows for precise control of fiber morphology.

On a commercial level, due to scalability reasons, there are 40 or sometimes 96 needles involved operating at once. The bottle-necks in such set-ups are maintaining the aforementioned variables uniformly for all of the needles and formation of "beads" in single fibers that should be of a uniform diameter. By modifying variables such as the distance to collector, magnitude of applied voltage, or solution flow rate – researchers can dramatically change the overall scaffold architecture.

Historically, research on electrospun fibrous scaffolds dates back to at least the late 1980s when Simon showed that electrospinning could be used to produce nano- and submicron-scale fibrous scaffolds from polymer solutions specifically intended for use as in vitro cell and tissue substrates. This early use of electrospun lattices for cell culture and tissue engineering showed that various cell types would adhere to and proliferate upon polycarbonate fibers. It was noted that as opposed to the flattened morphology typically seen in 2D culture, cells grown on the electrospun fibers exhibited a more rounded 3-dimensional morphology generally observed of tissues in vivo.

==== CAD/CAM technologies ====
Because most of the above techniques are limited when it comes to the control of porosity and pore size, computer assisted design and manufacturing techniques have been introduced to tissue engineering. First, a three-dimensional structure is designed using CAD software. The porosity can be tailored using algorithms within the software. The scaffold is then realized by using ink-jet printing of polymer powders or through Fused Deposition Modeling of a polymer melt.

A 2011 study by El-Ayoubi et al. investigated "3D-plotting technique to produce (biocompatible and biodegradable) poly-L-Lactide macroporous scaffolds with two different pore sizes" via solid free-form fabrication (SSF) with computer-aided-design (CAD), to explore therapeutic articular cartilage replacement as an "alternative to conventional tissue repair". The study found the smaller the pore size paired with mechanical stress in a bioreactor (to induce in vivo-like conditions), the higher the cell viability in potential therapeutic functionality via decreasing recovery time and increasing transplant effectiveness.

==== Laser-assisted bioprinting ====
In a 2012 study, Koch et al. focused on whether Laser-assisted BioPrinting (LaBP) can be used to build multicellular 3D patterns in natural matrix, and whether the generated constructs are functioning and forming tissue. LaBP arranges small volumes of living cell suspensions in set high-resolution patterns. The investigation was successful, the researchers foresee that "generated tissue constructs might be used for in vivo testing by implanting them into animal models" (14). As of this study, only human skin tissue has been synthesized, though researchers project that "by integrating further cell types (e.g. melanocytes, Schwann cells, hair follicle cells) into the printed cell construct, the behavior of these cells in a 3D in vitro microenvironment similar to their natural one can be analyzed", which is useful for drug discovery and toxicology studies.

==== Self-assembled recombinant spider silk nanomembranes ====
Gustafsson et al. demonstrated free‐standing, bioactive membranes of cm-sized area, but only 250 nm thin, that were formed by self‐assembly of spider silk at the interface of an aqueous solution. The membranes uniquely combine nanoscale thickness, biodegradability, ultrahigh strain and strength, permeability to proteins and promote rapid cell adherence and proliferation. They demonstrated growing a coherent layer of keratinocytes. These spider silk nanomembranes have also been used to create a static in-vitro model of a blood vessel.

==== Tissue engineering in situ ====
In situ tissue regeneration is defined as the implantation of biomaterials (alone or in combination with cells and/or biomolecules) into the tissue defect, using the surrounding microenvironment of the organism as a natural bioreactor. This approach has found application in bone regeneration, allowing the formation of cell-seeded constructs directly in the operating room.

== Assembly methods ==
A persistent problem within tissue engineering is mass transport limitations. Engineered tissues generally lack an initial blood supply, thus making it difficult for any implanted cells to obtain sufficient oxygen and nutrients to survive, or function properly.

=== Self-assembly ===
Self-assembly methods have been shown to be promising methods for tissue engineering. Self-assembly methods have the advantage of allowing tissues to develop their own extracellular matrix, resulting in tissue that better recapitulates biochemical and biomechanical properties of native tissue. Self-assembling engineered articular cartilage was introduced by Jerry Hu and Kyriacos A. Athanasiou in 2006 and applications of the process have resulted in engineered cartilage approaching the strength of native tissue. Self-assembly is a prime technology to get cells grown in a lab to assemble into three-dimensional shapes. To break down tissues into cells, researchers first have to dissolve the extracellular matrix that normally binds them together. Once cells are isolated, they must form the complex structures that make up our natural tissues.

=== Liquid-based template assembly ===
The air-liquid surface established by Faraday waves is explored as a template to assemble biological entities for bottom-up tissue engineering. This liquid-based template can be dynamically reconfigured in a few seconds, and the assembly on the template can be achieved in a scalable and parallel manner. Assembly of microscale hydrogels, cells, neuron-seeded micro-carrier beads, cell spheroids into various symmetrical and periodic structures was demonstrated with good cell viability. Formation of 3D neural network was achieved after 14-day tissue culture.

=== Additive manufacturing ===
It might be possible to print organs, or possibly entire organisms using additive manufacturing techniques. A recent innovative method of construction uses an ink-jet mechanism to print precise layers of cells in a matrix of thermo-reversible gel. Endothelial cells, the cells that line blood vessels, have been printed in a set of stacked rings. When incubated, these fused into a tube. This technique has been referred to as "bioprinting" within the field as it involves the printing of biological components in a structure resembling the organ of focus.

The field of three-dimensional and highly accurate models of biological systems is pioneered by multiple projects and technologies including a rapid method for creating tissues and even whole organs involve a 3D printer that can bio-print the scaffolding and cells layer by layer into a working tissue sample or organ. The device is presented in a TED talk by Dr. Anthony Atala, M.D. the Director of the Wake Forest Institute for Regenerative Medicine, and the W.H. Boyce Professor and Chair of the Department of Urology at Wake Forest University, in which a kidney is printed on stage during the seminar and then presented to the crowd. It is anticipated that this technology will enable the production of livers in the future for transplantation and theoretically for toxicology and other biological studies as well.

In 2015, Multi-Photon Processing (MPP) was employed for in vivo experiments by engineering artificial cartilage constructs. An ex vivo histological examination showed that certain pore geometry and the pre-growing of chondrocytes (Cho) prior to implantation significantly improves the performance of the created 3D scaffolds. The achieved biocompatibility was comparable to the commercially available collagen membranes. The successful outcome of this study supports the idea that hexagonal-pore-shaped hybrid organic-inorganic micro-structured scaffolds in combination with Cho seeding may be successfully implemented for cartilage tissue engineering.

Recently, tissue engineering has advanced with a focus on vascularization. Using Two-Photon Polymerization-based additive manufacturing, synthetic 3D microvessel networks are created from tubular hydrogel structures. These networks can perfuse tissues several cubic millimeters in size, enabling long-term viability and cell growth in vitro. This innovation marks a significant step forward in tissue engineering, facilitating the development of complex human tissue models.

=== Scaffolding ===
In 2013, using a 3D scaffolding of Matrigel in various configurations, substantial pancreatic organoids were produced in vitro. Clusters of small numbers of cells proliferated into 40,000 cells within one week. The clusters transform into cells that make either digestive enzymes or hormones like insulin, self-organizing into branched pancreatic organoids that resemble the pancreas.

The cells are sensitive to the environment, such as gel stiffness and contact with other cells. Individual cells do not thrive; a minimum of four proximate cells was required for subsequent organoid development. Modifications to the medium composition produced either hollow spheres mainly composed of pancreatic progenitors, or complex organoids that spontaneously undergo pancreatic morphogenesis and differentiation. Maintenance and expansion of pancreatic progenitors require active Notch and FGF signaling, recapitulating in vivo niche signaling interactions.

The organoids were seen as potentially offering mini-organs for drug testing and for spare insulin-producing cells.

Aside from Matrigel 3D scaffolds, other collagen gel systems have been developed. Collagen/hyaluronic acid scaffolds have been used for modeling the mammary gland In Vitro while co-coculturing epithelial and adipocyte cells. The HyStem kit is another 3D platform containing ECM components and hyaluronic acid that has been used for cancer research. Hydrogel constituents can be chemically modified to assist in crosslinking and enhance their mechanical properties.

== Tissue culture ==
In many cases, creation of functional tissues and biological structures in vitro requires extensive culturing to promote survival, growth and inducement of functionality. In general, the basic requirements of cells must be maintained in culture, which include oxygen, pH, humidity, temperature, nutrients and osmotic pressure maintenance.

Tissue engineered cultures also present additional problems in maintaining culture conditions. In standard cell culture, diffusion is often the sole means of nutrient and metabolite transport. As a culture becomes larger and more complex, such as the case with engineered organs and whole tissues, other mechanisms must be employed to maintain the culture, such as the creation of capillary networks within the tissue.

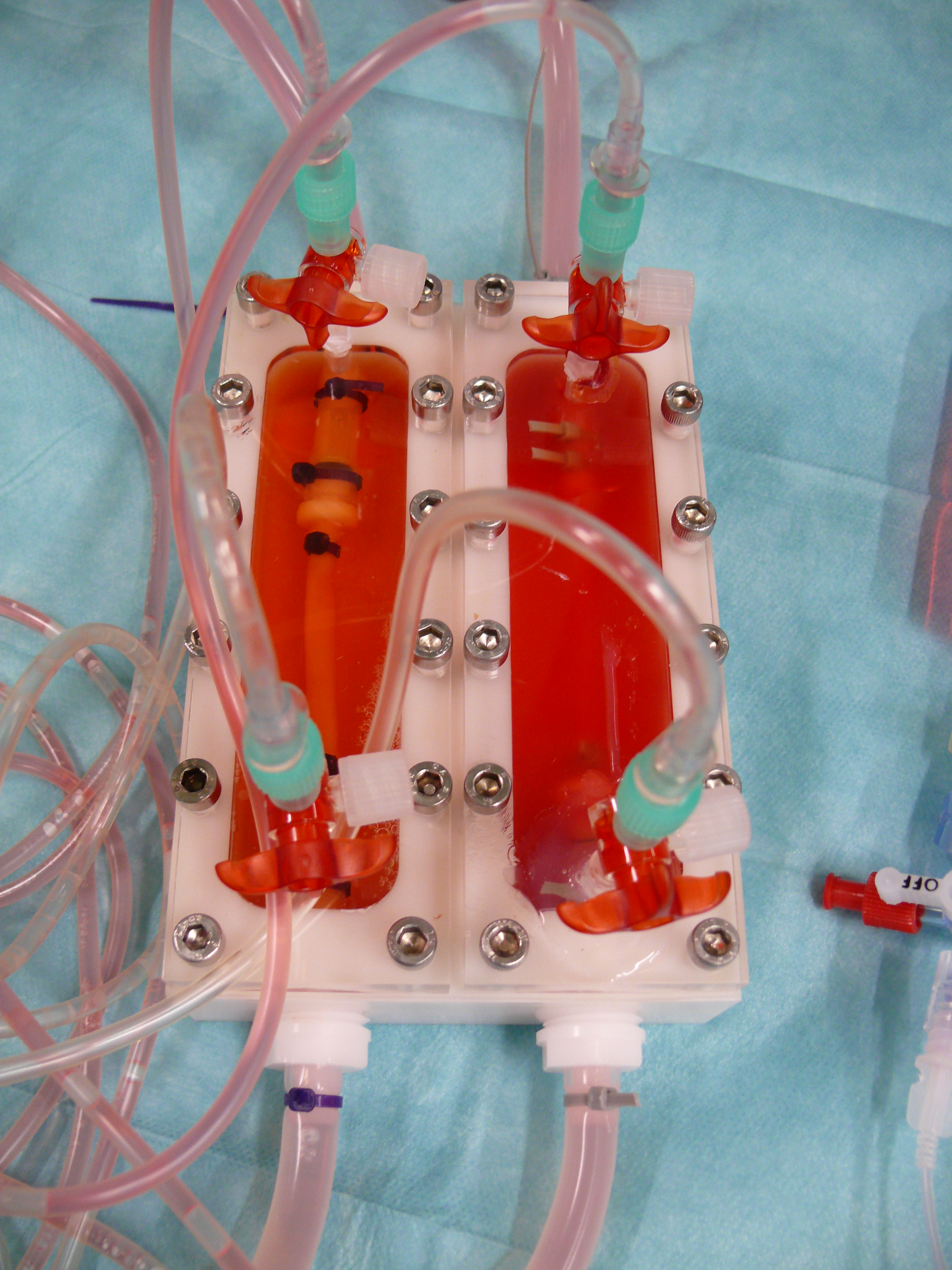
Bioreactor for cultivation of vascular grafts

Another issue with tissue culture is introducing the proper factors or stimuli required to induce functionality. In many cases, simple maintenance culture is not sufficient. Growth factors, hormones, specific metabolites or nutrients, chemical and physical stimuli are sometimes required. For example, certain cells respond to changes in oxygen tension as part of their normal development, such as chondrocytes, which must adapt to low oxygen conditions or hypoxia during skeletal development. Others, such as endothelial cells, respond to shear stress from fluid flow, which is encountered in blood vessels. Mechanical stimuli, such as pressure pulses seem to be beneficial to all kind of cardiovascular tissue such as heart valves, blood vessels or pericardium.

=== Bioreactors ===
In tissue engineering, a bioreactor is a device that attempts to simulate a physiological environment in order to promote cell or tissue growth in vitro. A physiological environment can consist of many different parameters such as temperature, pressure, oxygen or carbon dioxide concentration, or osmolality of fluid environment, and it can extend to all kinds of biological, chemical or mechanical stimuli. Therefore, there are systems that may include the application of forces such as electromagnetic forces, mechanical pressures, or fluid pressures to the tissue. These systems can be two- or three-dimensional setups. Bioreactors can be used in both academic and industry applications. General-use and application-specific bioreactors are also commercially available, which may provide static chemical stimulation or a combination of chemical and mechanical stimulation.

Cell proliferation and differentiation are largely influenced by mechanical and biochemical cues in the surrounding extracellular matrix environment. Bioreactors are typically developed to replicate the specific physiological environment of the tissue being grown (e.g., flex and fluid shearing for heart tissue growth). This can allow specialized cell lines to thrive in cultures replicating their native environments, but it also makes bioreactors attractive tools for culturing stem cells. A successful stem-cell-based bioreactor is effective at expanding stem cells with uniform properties and/or promoting controlled, reproducible differentiation into selected mature cell types.

There are a variety of bioreactors designed for 3D cell cultures. There are small plastic cylindrical chambers, as well as glass chambers, with regulated internal humidity and moisture specifically engineered for the purpose of growing cells in three dimensions. The bioreactor uses bioactive synthetic materials such as polyethylene terephthalate membranes to surround the spheroid cells in an environment that maintains high levels of nutrients. They are easy to open and close, so that cell spheroids can be removed for testing, yet the chamber is able to maintain 100% humidity throughout. This humidity is important to achieve maximum cell growth and function. The bioreactor chamber is part of a larger device that rotates to ensure equal cell growth in each direction across three dimensions.

QuinXell Technologies, now under Quintech Life Sciences from Singapore has developed a bioreactor known as the TisXell Biaxial Bioreactor which is specially designed for the purpose of tissue engineering. It is the first bioreactor in the world to have a spherical glass chamber with biaxial rotation; specifically to mimic the rotation of the fetus in the womb; which provides a conducive environment for the growth of tissues.

Multiple forms of mechanical stimulation have also been combined into a single bioreactor. Using gene expression analysis, one academic study found that applying a combination of cyclic strain and ultrasound stimulation to pre-osteoblast cells in a bioreactor accelerated matrix maturation and differentiation. The technology of this combined stimulation bioreactor could be used to grow bone cells more quickly and effectively in future clinical stem cell therapies.

MC2 Biotek has also developed a bioreactor known as ProtoTissue that uses gas exchange to maintain high oxygen levels within the cell chamber; improving upon previous bioreactors, since the higher oxygen levels help the cell grow and undergo normal cell respiration.

Active areas of research on bioreactors include increasing production scale and refining the physiological environment, both of which could improve the efficiency and efficacy of bioreactors in research or clinical use. Bioreactors are currently used to study, among other things, cell and tissue level therapies, cell and tissue response to specific physiological environment changes, and development of disease and injury.

=== Long fiber generation ===
In 2013, a group from the University of Tokyo developed cell laden fibers up to a meter in length and on the order of 100 μm in size. These fibers were created using a microfluidic device that forms a double coaxial laminar flow. Each layer of the microfluidic device, cells seeded in ECM, a hydrogel sheath, and finally a calcium chloride solution. The seeded cells culture within the hydrogel sheath for several days, and then the sheath is removed with viable cell fibers. Various cell types were inserted into the ECM core, including myocytes, endothelial cells, nerve cell fibers, and epithelial cell fibers. This group then showed that these fibers can be woven together to fabricate tissues or organs in a mechanism similar to textile weaving. Fibrous morphologies are advantageous in that they provide an alternative to traditional scaffold design, and many organs (such as muscle) are composed of fibrous cells.

=== Bioartificial organs ===
An artificial organ is an engineered device that can be extra corporeal or implanted to support impaired or failing organ systems. Bioartificial organs are typically created with the intent to restore critical biological functions like in the replacement of diseased hearts and lungs, or provide drastic quality of life improvements like in the use of engineered skin on burn victims. While some examples of bioartificial organs are still in the research stage of development due to the limitations involved with creating functional organs, others are currently being used in clinical settings experimentally and commercially.

==== Lung ====
Extracorporeal membrane oxygenation (ECMO) machines, otherwise known as heart and lung machines, are an adaptation of cardiopulmonary bypass techniques that provide heart and lung support. It is used primarily to support the lungs for a prolonged but still temporary timeframe (1–30 days) and allow for recovery from reversible diseases. Robert Bartlett is known as the father of ECMO and performed the first treatment of a newborn using an ECMO machine in 1975.

Skin

Tissue-engineered skin is a type of bioartificial organ that is often used to treat burns, diabetic foot ulcers, or other large wounds that cannot heal well on their own. Artificial skin can be made from autografts, allografts, and xenografts. Autografted skin comes from a patient's own skin, which allows the dermis to have a faster healing rate, and the donor site can be re-harvested a few times. Allograft skin often comes from cadaver skin and is mostly used to treat burn victims. Lastly, xenografted skin comes from animals and provides a temporary healing structure for the skin. They assist in dermal regeneration, but cannot become part of the host skin. Tissue-engineered skin is available in commercial products. Integra, originally used to only treat burns, consists of a collagen matrix and chondroitin sulfate that can be used as a skin replacement. The chondroitin sulfate functions as a component of proteoglycans, which helps to form the extracellular matrix. Integra can be repopulated and revascularized while maintaining its dermal collagen architecture, making it a bioartificial organ. Dermagraft, another commercial-made tissue-engineered skin product, is made out of living fibroblasts. These fibroblasts proliferate and produce growth factors, collagen, and ECM proteins, that help build granulation tissue.

==== Heart ====
Since the number of patients awaiting a heart transplant is continuously increasing over time, and the number of patients on the waiting list surpasses the organ availability, artificial organs used as replacement therapy for terminal heart failure would help alleviate this difficulty. Artificial hearts are usually used to bridge the heart transplantation or can be applied as replacement therapy for terminal heart malfunction. The total artificial heart (TAH), first introduced by Dr. Vladimir P. Demikhov in 1937 emerged as an ideal alternative. Since then, it has been developed and improved as a mechanical pump that provides long-term circulatory support and replaces diseased or damaged heart ventricles that cannot properly pump the blood, restoring the pulmonary and systemic flow. An example of a TAH would be AbioCor, an FDA-approved device that comprises two artificial ventricles and their valves, which does not require subcutaneous connections, and is indicated for patients with biventricular heart failure. In 2010, SynCardia released the portable freedom driver that allows patients to have a portable device without being confined to the hospital.

==== Kidney ====
While kidney transplants are possible, renal failure is more often treated using an artificial kidney. The first artificial kidneys and the majority of those currently in use are extracorporeal, such as with hemodialysis, which filters blood directly, or peritoneal dialysis, which filters via a fluid in the abdomen. In order to contribute to the biological functions of a kidney such as producing metabolic factors or hormones, some artificial kidneys incorporate renal cells. There has been progress in the way of making these devices smaller and more transportable, or even implantable. One challenge still to be faced in these smaller devices is countering the limited volume and therefore limited filtering capabilities.

Bioscaffolds have also been introduced to provide a framework upon which normal kidney tissue can be regenerated. These scaffolds encompass natural scaffolds (e.g., decellularized kidneys, collagen hydrogel, or silk fibroin), synthetic scaffolds (e.g., polylactic-co-glycolic acid or other polymers), or a combination of two or more natural and synthetic scaffolds. These scaffolds can be implanted into the body either without cell treatment or after a period of stem cell seeding and incubation. In vitro and in vivo studies are being conducted to compare and optimize the type of scaffold and to assess whether cell seeding prior to implantation adds to the viability, regeneration and effective function of the kidneys. A recent systematic review and meta-analysis compared the results of published animal studies and identified that improved outcomes are reported with the use of hybrid (mixed) scaffolds and cell seeding; however, the meta-analysis of these results were not in agreement with the evaluation of descriptive results from the review. Therefore, further studies involving larger animals and novel scaffolds, and more transparent reproduction of previous studies are advisable.

=== Biomimetics ===
Biomimetics is a field that aims to produce materials and systems that replicate those present in nature. In the context of tissue engineering, this is a common approach used by engineers to create materials for these applications that are comparable to native tissues in terms of their structure, properties, and biocompatibility. Material properties are largely dependent on physical, structural, and chemical characteristics of that material. Subsequently, a biomimetic approach to system design will become significant in material integration, and a sufficient understanding of biological processes and interactions will be necessary. Replication of biological systems and processes may also be used in the synthesis of bio-inspired materials to achieve conditions that produce the desired biological material. Therefore, if a material is synthesized having the same characteristics of biological tissues both structurally and chemically, then ideally the synthesized material will have similar properties. This technique has an extensive history originating from the idea of using natural phenomenon as design inspiration for solutions to human problems. Many modern advancements in technology have been inspired by nature and natural systems, including aircraft, automobiles, architecture, and even industrial systems. Advancements in nanotechnology initiated the application of this technique to micro- and nano-scale problems, including tissue engineering. This technique has been used to develop synthetic bone tissues, vascular technologies, scaffolding materials and integration techniques, and functionalized nanoparticles.

== Constructing neural networks in soft material ==
In 2018, scientists at Brandeis University reported their research on soft material embedded with chemical networks which can mimic the smooth and coordinated behavior of neural tissue. This research was funded by the U.S. Army Research Laboratory. The researchers presented an experimental system of neural networks, theoretically modeled as reaction-diffusion systems. Within the networks was an array of patterned reactors, each performing the Belousov-Zhabotinsky (BZ) reaction. These reactors could function on a nanoliter scale.

The researchers state that the inspiration for their project was the movement of the blue ribbon eel. The eel's movements are controlled by electrical impulses determined by a class of neural networks called the central pattern generator. Central Pattern Generators function within the autonomic nervous system to control bodily functions such as respiration, movement, and peristalsis.

Qualities of the reactor that were designed were the network topology, boundary conditions, initial conditions, reactor volume, coupling strength, and the synaptic polarity of the reactor (whether its behavior is inhibitory or excitatory). A BZ emulsion system with a solid elastomer polydimethylsiloxane (PDMS) was designed. Both light and bromine permeable PDMS have been reported as viable methods to create a pacemaker for neural networks.

== Market ==
The history of the tissue engineering market can be divided into three major parts: The time before the crash of the biotech market in the early 2000s, the crash, and the time afterward.

=== Beginning ===
Most early progress in tissue engineering research was done in the US. This is due to less strict regulations regarding stem cell research and more available funding than in other countries. This leads to the creation of academic startups many of them coming from Harvard or MIT. Examples are BioHybrid Technologies whose founder, Bill Chick, went to Harvard Medical School and focused on the creation of artificial pancreas. Another example would be Organogenesis Inc. whose founder went to MIT and worked on skin engineering products. Other companies with links to the MIT are TEI Biosciences, Therics and Guilford Pharmaceuticals. The renewed interest in biotechnologies in the 1980s leads to many private investors investing in these new technologies even though the business models of these early startups were often not very clear and did not present a path to long term profitability. Government sponsors were more restrained in their funding as tissue engineering was considered a high-risk investment.

In the UK, the market got off to a slower start even though the regulations on stem cell research were not strict as well. This is mainly due to more investors being less willing to invest in these new technologies which were considered to be high-risk investments. Another problem faced by British companies was getting the NHS to pay for their products. This was because the NHS runs a cost-effectiveness analysis on all supported products. Novel technologies often do not do well in this respect.

In Japan, the regulatory situation was quite different. First cell cultivation was only allowed in a hospital setting and second academic scientists employed by state-owned universities were not allowed outside employment until 1998. Moreover, the Japanese authorities took longer to approve new drugs and treatments than there US and European counterparts.

For these reasons, in the early days of the Japanese market, the focus was mainly on getting products that were already approved elsewhere in Japan and selling them. Contrary to the US market the early actors in Japan were mainly big firms or sub-companies of such big firms, such as J-TEC, Menicon and Terumo, and not small startups. After regulatory changes in 2014, which allowed cell cultivation outside of a hospital setting, the speed of research in Japan increased and Japanese companies also started to develop their own products.

=== Crash ===
Soon after the big boom, the first problems started to appear. There were problems getting products approved by the FDA and if they got approved there were often difficulties in getting insurance providers to pay for the products and getting it accepted by health care providers.

For example, Organogenesis ran into problems marketing its product and integrating its product in the health system. This was partially due to the difficulties of handling living cells and the increased difficulties faced by physicians in using these products over conventional methods.

Another example would be Advanced Tissue Sciences Dermagraft skin product which could not create a high enough demand without reimbursements from insurance providers. This was because of a $4000 price-tag and Advanced Tissue Sciences struggling to get their product known by physicians.

The above examples demonstrate how companies struggled to make profit. This, in turn, lead investors to lose patience and stop further funding. In consequence, several tissue engineering companies such as Organogenesis and Advanced Tissue Sciences filed for bankruptcy in the early 2000s. At this time, these were the only ones having commercial skin products on the market.

=== Reemergence ===
The technologies of the bankrupt or struggling companies were often bought by other companies which continued the development under more conservative business models. Examples of companies who sold their products after folding were Curis and Intercytex.

Many of the companies abandoned their long-term goals of developing fully functional organs in favor of products and technologies that could turn a profit in the short run. Examples of these kinds of products are products in the cosmetic and testing industry.

In other cases, such as Advanced Tissue Sciences', the founders started new companies.

In the 2010s, the regulatory framework also started to facilitate faster time to market especially in the US as new centres and pathways were created by the FDA specifically aimed at products coming from living cells such as the Center for Biologics Evaluation and Research.

== Regulation ==
In Europe, regulation is currently split into three areas of regulation: medical devices, medicinal products, and biologics. Tissue engineering products are often of hybrid nature, as they are often composed of cells and a supporting structure. While some products can be approved as medicinal products, others need to gain approval as medical devices. Mechteld-Hanna Gertrud Derksen explains in her thesis that tissue engineering researchers are sometimes confronted with regulation that does not fit the characteristics of tissue engineering.

New regulatory regimes have been observed in Europe that tackle these issues. An explanation for the difficulties in finding regulatory consensus in this matter is given by a survey conducted in the UK. The authors attribute these problems to the close relatedness and overlap with other technologies such as xenotransplantation. It can therefore not be handled separately by regulatory bodies. Regulation is further complicated by the ethical controversies associated with this and related fields of research (e.g. stem cells controversy, ethics of organ transplantation). The same survey as mentioned above shows on the example of autologous cartilage transplantation that a specific technology can be regarded as 'pure' or 'polluted' by the same social actor.

Two regulatory movements are most relevant to tissue engineering in the European Union. These are Directive 2004/23/EC on standards of quality and safety for the sourcing and processing of human tissues which was adopted by the European Parliament in 2004 and a proposed Human Tissue-Engineered Products regulation. The latter was developed under the auspices of the European Commission DG Enterprise and presented in Brussels in 2004.

== See also ==
- Biomedical engineering
- Biological engineering
- Biomolecular engineering
- Biochemical engineering
- Cell engineering
- Chemical engineering
- ECM Biomaterial
- In vivo bioreactor
- Induced stem cells
- Molecular processor
- Molecular self-assembly
- Muscle tissue engineering
- National Institutes of Health
- National Science Foundation
- Quality control in tissue engineering
- Regeneration in humans
- Soft tissues
- Thiomers
- Tissue Engineering and Regenerative Medicine International Society
- Tissue engineering of heart valves
- Xenotransplantation
