= Bioartificial heart =

Type of engineered heart

A bioartificial heart is an engineered heart that contains the extracellular structure of a decellularized heart and cellular components from a different source. Such hearts are of particular interest for therapy as well as research into heart disease. The first bioartificial hearts were created in 2008 using cadaveric rat hearts. In 2014, human-sized bioartificial pig hearts were constructed. Bioartificial hearts have not been developed yet for clinical use, although the recellularization of porcine hearts with human cells opens the door to xenotransplantation.

== Background ==
Heart failure is one of the leading causes of death. In 2013, an estimate of 17.3 million deaths per year out of the 54 million total deaths was caused by cardiovascular diseases, meaning that 31.5% of the world's total death was caused by this. Often, the only viable treatment for end-stage heart failure is organ transplantation. Currently organ supply is insufficient to meet the demand, which presents a large limitation in an end-stage treatment plan. A theoretical alternative to traditional transplantation processes is the engineering of personalized bioartificial hearts. Researchers have had many successful advances in the engineering of cardiovascular tissue and have looked towards using decellularized and recellularized cadaveric hearts in order to create a functional organ. Decellularization-recellularization involves using a cadaveric heart, removing the cellular contents while maintaining the protein matrix (decellularization), and subsequently facilitating growth of appropriate cardiovascular tissue inside the remaining matrix (recellularization).

Over the past years, researchers have identified populations of cardiac stem cells that reside in the adult human heart. This discovery sparked the idea of regenerating the heart cells by taking the stem cells inside the heart and reprogramming them into cardiac tissues. The importance of these stem cells are self-renewal, the ability to differentiate into cardiomyocytes, endothelial cells and smooth vascular muscle cells, and clonogenicity. These stem cells are capable of becoming myocytes, which are for stabilizing the topography of the intercellular components, as well as to help control the size and shape of the heart, as well as vascular cells, which serve as a cell reservoir for the turnover and the maintenance of the mesenchymal tissues. However, in vivo studies have demonstrated that the regenerative ability of implanted cardiac stem cells lies in the associated macrophage-mediated immune response and concomitant fibroblast-mediated wound healing and not in their functionality, since these effects were observed for both live and dead stem cells.

== Methodology ==
The preferred method to remove all cellular components from a heart is perfusion decellularization. This technique involves perfusing the heart with detergents such as SDS and Triton X-100 dissolved in distilled water.

The remaining ECM is composed of structural elements such as collagen, laminin, elastin and fibronectin. The ECM scaffold promotes proper cellular proliferation and differentiation, vascular development, as well as providing mechanical support for cellular growth. Because minimal DNA material remains after the decellularization process, the engineered organ is biocompatible with the transplant recipient, regardless of species. Unlike traditional transplant options, recellularized hearts are less immunogenic and have a decreased risk of rejection.

Once the decellularized heart has been sterilized to remove any pathogens, the recellularization process can occur. Multipotent cardiovascular progenitors are then added to the decellularized heart and with additional exogenous growth factors, are stimulated to differentiate into cardiomyocytes, smooth muscle cells and endothelial cells.

== Recellularized heart functionality ==
The most promising results come from recellularized rat hearts. After only 8 days of maturation, the heart models were stimulated with an electrical signal to provide pacing. The heart models showed a unified contraction with a force equivalent to ~2% of a normal rat heart or ~25% of that of a 16-week-old human heart.

Although far from use in a clinical setting, there have been great advances in the field of bioartificial heart generation. The use of decellularization and recellularization processes, has led to the production of a three dimensional matrix that promotes cellular growth; the repopulation of the matrix containing appropriate cell composition; and the bioengineering of organs demonstrating functionality (limited) and responsiveness to stimuli. This area shows immense promise and with future research may redefine treatment of end stage heart failure.
