= Muscle tissue engineering =

Generation and application of muscle tissue

Muscle tissue engineering is a subset of the general field of tissue engineering, which studies the combined use of cells and scaffolds to design therapeutic tissue implants. Within the clinical setting, muscle tissue engineering involves the culturing of cells from the patient's own body or from a donor, development of muscle tissue with or without the use of scaffolds, then the insertion of functional muscle tissue into the patient's body. Ideally, this implantation results in full regeneration of function and aesthetic within the patient's body. Outside the clinical setting, muscle tissue engineering is involved in drug screening, hybrid mechanical muscle actuators, robotic devices, and the development of cell-cultured meat as a new food source.

Innovations within the field of muscle tissue engineering seek to repair and replace defective muscle tissue, thus returning normal function.The practice begins by harvesting and isolating muscle cells from a donor site, then culturing those cells in media. The cultured cells form cell sheets and finally muscle bundles which are implanted into the patient.

== Overview ==
Muscle is a naturally aligned organ, with individual muscle fibers packed together into larger units called muscle fascicles. The uniaxial alignment of muscle fibers allows them to simultaneously contract in the same direction and properly propagate force on the bones via the tendons. Approximately 45% of the human body is composed of muscle tissue, and this tissue can be classified into three different groups: skeletal muscle, cardiac muscle, and smooth muscle. Muscle plays a role in structure, stability, and movement in mammalian bodies. The basic unit for a muscle is a muscle fiber, which is made up of myofilaments actin and myosin. This muscle fiber contains sarcomeres which generate the force required for contraction.

A major focus of muscle tissue engineering is to create constructs with the functionality of native muscle and ability to contract. To this end, alignment of the tissue engineered construct is extremely important. It has been shown that cells grown on substrates with alignment cues form more robust muscle fibers. Several other design criteria considered in muscle tissue engineering include the scaffold porosity, stiffness, biocompatibility, and degradation timeline. Substrate stiffness should ideally be in the myogenic range, which has been shown to be 10-15 kPa.

The purpose of muscle tissue engineering is to reconstruct functional muscular tissue which has been lost via traumatic injury, tumor ablation, or functional damage caused by myopathies. Until now, the only method used to restore muscular tissue function and aesthetic was free tissue transfer. Full function is typically not restored, however, which results in donor site morbidity and volume deficiency. The success of tissue engineering as it pertains to the regeneration of skin, cartilage, and bone indicates that the same success will be found in engineering muscular tissue. Early innovations in the field yielded in vitro cell culturing and regeneration of muscle tissue which would be implanted in the body, but advances in recent years have shown that there may be potential for in vivo muscle tissue engineering using scaffolding.

== Etymology ==
The term muscle tissue engineering, while it is a subset of the much larger discipline, tissue engineering, was first coined in 1988 when Herman Vandenburgh, a surgeon, cultured avian myotubes in collagen-coated culture plates. This started a new era of in vitro tissue engineering. The ideal was officially adopted in 1988 in Vandenburgh's publication titled Maintenance of Highly Contractile Tissue-Cultured Avian Skeletal Myotubes in Collagen Gel. In 1989, the same group determined that mechanical stimulation of myoblasts in vitro facilitates engineered skeletal muscle growth.

== History ==
=== 19th Century ===
A rudimentary understanding of muscle tissue began to develop as early as 1835, when embryonic myogenesis was first described. In the 1860s, it was shown that muscle is capable of regeneration and an experimental regeneration was conducted to better understand the specific method by which this was done in vivo. Following this discovery, muscle generation and degeneration in man were described for the first time. Researchers consequently assessed several aspects of muscle regeneration in vivo, including "the continuous or discontinuous regeneration depending on tissue type" to increase functional understanding of the phenomena. It was not until the 1960s, however, that researchers determined what components were required for muscle regeneration.

=== 20th Century ===
In 1957, it was determined via DNA content that myoblasts proliferate, but myonuclei do not. Following this discovery, the satellite cell was experimentally uncovered by Mauro and Katz as stem cells which sit on the surface of the myofibre and have the capability to differentiate into muscle cells. Satellite cells provide myoblasts for growth, differentiation, and repair of muscle tissue. Muscle tissue engineering officially began as a discipline in 1988 when Herman Vandenburgh cultured avian myotubes in collagen-coated culture plates. Following this development, it was found in 1989 that mechanical stimulation of myoblasts in vitro facilitates engineered skeletal muscle growth. Most of the modern innovations in the field of muscle tissue engineering are found in the 21st century.

=== 21st Century ===
Between 2000 and 2010, the effects of volumetric muscle loss (VML) were assessed as it pertains to muscle tissue engineering. VML can be caused by a variety of injuries or diseases, including general trauma, postoperative damage, cancer ablation, congenital defects, and degenerative myopathy. Although muscle contains a stem cell population called satellite cells that are capable of regenerating small muscle injuries, muscle damage in VML is so extensive that it overwhelms muscle's natural regenerative capabilities. Currently VML is treated through an autologous muscle flap or graft but there are various problems associated with this procedure. Donor site morbidity, lack of donor tissue, and inadequate vascularization all limit the ability of doctors to adequately treat VML. The field of muscle tissue engineering attempts to address this problem through the design of a functional muscle construct that can be used to treat the damaged muscle instead of harvesting an autologous muscle flap from elsewhere on the patient's body.

Research conducted between 2000 and 2010 informed the conclusion that functional analysis of a tissue engineered muscle construct is important to illustrate its potential to help regenerate muscle. A variety of assays are generally used to evaluate a tissue engineered muscle construct including immunohistochemistry, RT-PCR, electrical stimulation and resulting peak-to-peak voltage, scanning electron microscope imaging, and in vivo response.

The most recent advances in the field include cultured meat, biorobotic systems, and biohybrid implants in regenerative medicine or disease modeling.

== Examples ==
The majority of current advancements in muscle tissue engineering reside in the skeletal muscle category, so the majority of these examples will have to do with skeletal muscle engineering and regeneration. We will review a couple of examples of smooth muscle tissue engineering and cardiac muscle tissue engineering in this section as well.

=== Skeletal Muscle Tissue Engineering (SMTE) ===
- Avian myotubes: highly contractile skeletal myotubes cultured and differentiated in vitro on collagen-coated culture plates
- Cultured Meat (CM): cultured, cell based, lab grown, in vitro, clean meat obtained through cellular agriculture
- Human Bio-Artificial Muscle (BAM): formed through a seven day, in vitro tissue engineering procedure in which human myoblasts fuse and differentiate into aligned myofibers in an extracellular matrix; these constructs are used for intramuscular drug injection to replace pre- or non-clinical injection models and complement animal studies
- Myoblast transfer in the treatment of Duchenne's Muscular Dystrophy (DMD): an in vivo technique to replace dystrophin, a skeletal muscle protein which is deficient in patients with DMD; myoblasts fuse with muscle fibers and contribute their nuclei which then replace deficient gene products in the host nuclei
- Autologous hematopoetic stem cell transplantation (AHSCT) as a method for treating Multiple Sclerosis (MS): an in vivo technique for treating MS in which the immune system is destroyed and is reconstituted with hematopoetic stem cells; has been shown to reduce the effects of MS for 4-5 years in 70-80% of patients
- Volumetric muscle loss repair using Muscle Derived Stem Cells (MDSCs): an in situ technique for muscle loss repair in which patients have suffered from trauma or combat injuries; MDSCs cast in an in situ fibrin gel were capable of forming new myofibres that became engrafted in a muscle defect that was created by a partial-thickness wedge resection in the tibialis anterior muscle of laboratory mice
- Development of skeletal muscle organoids to model neuromuscular disorders and muscular dystrophies; an in vitro technique in which human pluripotent stem cells (hPSCs) are differentiated into functional 3D human skeletal muscle organoid (hSkMOs); hPSCs were guided towards the paraxial mesodermal lineage which then gives rise to myogenic progenitor cells and myoblasts in well plates with no scaffold; organoids were round, uniformly sized, and exhibited homogeneous morphology upon full development and were shown to successfully model muscle development and regeneration
- Bioprinted Tibialis Anterior (TA) Muscle in Rats: an in vitro technique in which bioengineered skeletal muscle tissue composed of human primary muscle progenitor cells (hMPCs) was fabricated – upon implantation, the bioprinted material reached 82% functional recovery in rodent models of the TA muscle.

=== Smooth Muscle Tissue Engineering ===
- Autologous MDSC Injections to Treat Urinary Incontinence: an in vivo injection technique for pure stress incontinence in female subjects in which defective muscle cells were replaced with stem cells that would differentiate to become functioning smooth muscle cells in the urinary sphincter
- Vascular Smooth Muscle regeneration using induced pluripotent stem cells (iPSCs); an in vitro technique in which iPSCs were differentiated into proliferative smooth muscle cells using a nanofibrous scaffold.
- Formation of coiled three-dimensional (3D) cellular constructs containing smooth muscle-like cells differentiated from dedifferentiated fat (DFAT) cells: an in vitro technique for controlling the 3D organization of smooth muscle cells in which DFAT cells are suspended in a mixture of extracellular proteins with optimized stiffness so that they differentiate into smooth muscle-like cells with specific 3D orientation; a muscle tissue engineered construct for a smooth muscle cell precursor

=== Cardiac Muscle Tissue Engineering ===
- Intracoronary Administration of Bone Marrow-Derived Progenitor Cells: an in vivo technique in which progenitor cells derived from bone marrow are administered into an infarct artery to differentiate into functional cardiac cells and recover contractile function after an acute, ST-elevation myocardial infarction, thus preventing adverse remodeling of the left ventricle.
- Human Cardiac Organoids:an in vitro, scaffold-free technique for producing a functioning cardiac organoid; cardiac spheroids made from a mixed cell population derived from human induced pluripotent stem cell-derived cardiomyocytes (hiPSC-CMs) cultured on gelatin-coated well plates, without a scaffold, resulted in the generation of a functioning cardiac organoid

== Methods ==
Muscle tissue engineering methods are consistently categorized across literature into three groups: in situ, in vivo, and in vitro muscle tissue engineering. We will assess each of these categories and detail specific practices used in each one.

=== In Situ ===
"In situ" is a latin phrase whose literal translation is "on site." It is a term that has been used in the English language since the mid-eighteenth century to describe something that is in its original place or position. In the context of muscle tissue engineering, in situ tissue engineering involves the introduction and implantation of an acellular scaffold into the site of injury or degenerated tissue. The goal of in situ muscle tissue engineering is to encourage host cell recruitment, natural scaffold formation, and proliferation and differentiation of host cells. The main idea which in situ muscle tissue engineering is based on is the self-healing, regenerative properties of the mammalian body. The primary method for in situ muscle tissue engineering is described in the following section:

As described in Biomaterials for In Situ Tissue Regeneration: A Review (Abdulghani & Mitchell, 2019), in situ muscle tissue engineering requires very specific biomaterials which have the capability to recruit stem cells or progenitor cells to the site of the muscle defect, thus allowing regeneration of tissue without implantation of seed cells. The key to a successful scaffold is the appropriate properties (i.e. biocompatibility, mechanical strength, elasticity, biodegradability) and the correct shape and volume for the specific muscle defect in which they are implanted. This scaffold should effectively mimic the cellular response of the host tissue, and Mann et al. have found that Polyethylene glycol-based hydrogels are very successful as in situ biomaterial scaffolds because they are chemically modified to be degraded by biological enzymes, thus encouraging cell migration and proliferation. Beyond Polyethylene glycol-based hydrogels, synthetic biomaterials such as PLA and PCL are successful in situ scaffolds as they can be fully customized to each specific patient. These materials' stiffness, degradation, and porosity properties are tailored to the degenerated tissue's topology, volume, and cell type so as to provide the optimal environment for host cell migration and proliferation.

In situ engineering promotes natural regeneration of damaged tissue by effectively mimicking the mammalian body's own wound healing response. The use of both biological and synthetic biomaterials as scaffolds promotes host cell migration and proliferation directly to the defect site, thus decreasing the amount of time required for muscle tissue regeneration. Furthermore, in situ engineering effectively bypasses the risk of implant rejection by the immune system due to the biodegradable qualities in each scaffold.

=== In Vivo ===
"In vivo" is a latin phrase whose literal translation is "in a living thing." This term is used in the English language to describe a process which occurs inside of a living organism. In the realm of muscle tissue engineering, this term applies to the seeding of cells into a biomaterial scaffold immediately prior to implantation. The goal of in vivo muscle tissue engineering is to create a cell-seeded scaffold that once implanted into the wound site will preserve cell efficacy. In vivo methods provide a greater amount of control over cell phenotype, mechanical properties, and functionality of the tissue construct.

As described in Skeletal Muscle Tissue Engineering: Biomaterials-Based Strategies for the Treatment of Volumetric Muscle Loss (Carnes & Pins, 2020), in vivo muscle tissue engineering builds on the concept of in situ engineering by not only implanting a biomaterial scaffold with specific mechanical and chemical properties, but also seeding the scaffold with the specific cell type needed for regeneration of the tissue. Reid et al. describe common scaffolds utilized in the in vivo muscle tissue engineering process. These scaffolds include hydrogels infused with hyaluronic acid (HA), gelatin silk fibroin, and chitosan as these materials promote muscle cell migration and proliferation. For example, a biodegradable and renewable material derived from chitin known as chitosan, has unique mechanical properties which support smooth muscle cell differentiation and retention in the tissue regeneration site. When this scaffold is further functionalized with Arginine-Glycine-Aspartic Acid (RGD), it provides a better growth environment for smooth muscle cells. Another scaffold commonly used is decellularized extracellular matrix (ECM) tissue as it is fully biocompatible, biodegradable, and contains all of the necessary protein binding sites for full functional recovery and integration of muscle tissue. Once seeded with cells, this material becomes an optimal environment for cell proliferation and integration with existing tissue as it effectively mimics the environment in which tissue naturally regenerates in the mammalian body.

The in vivo muscle tissue engineering technique provides the wound healing process with a "head start" in development, as the body no longer needs to recruit host cells to begin regeneration. This approach also bypasses the need for cell manipulation prior to implantation, thus ensuring that they maintain all of their mechanical and functional properties.

=== In Vitro ===
"In vitro" is a latin phrase whose literal translation is "within the glass." This term is used in the English language to describe a process which occurs outside of a living organism. Within the context of muscle tissue engineering, the term "in vitro" applies to the seeding of cells into a biomaterial scaffold with growth factors and nutrients, then culturing these constructs until a functional construct, such as myofibres, is developed. These developed constructs are then implanted into the wound site with the expectation that they will continue to proliferate and integrate into host muscle tissue. The goal of in vitro muscle tissue engineering is to increase the functionality of the tissue before it is ever implanted into the body, thus increasing mechanical properties and potential to thrive in the host body.

Abdulghani & Mitchell describe in vitro muscle tissue engineering as a concept with utilizes the same basic strategies of in vivo tissue engineering. The difference between the two methods, however, is the development of a fully functional tissue engineered muscle graft (TEMG) that occurs in the in vitro technique. In vitro muscle tissue engineering includes the seeding of cells onto a biomaterial scaffold, but goes a step further by adding growth factors and biochemical and biophysical cues to promote cell growth, proliferation, differentiation, and finally regeneration into a functional muscle tissue construct. Typically, in vitro scaffolds contain specific surface features which guide the direction of cell proliferation. They are usually fibrous with aligned pores as these features encourage cell adhesion during regeneration. Beyond the types of scaffolds used in this technique, a largely important aspect of this technique is the electrical and mechanical stimulation which mimic the natural regeneration environment and encourage the expansion of intracellular communication pathways. Before TEMGs are introduced into the wound defect, they musts be vascularized to promote proper integration with the host tissue. To achieve vascularization, researchers typically seed a scaffold with multiple cell types in order to develop both muscle tissue and vascular pathways. This process prevents rejection of the TEMG upon implantation as it is able to effectively thrive in the host tissue environment. There is always a risk of immune rejection when implanting fully developed tissue, though, so this method tissue regeneration is the most closely monitored post-implantation.

The in vitro muscle tissue engineering technique is used to create muscle tissue with more successful functional and mechanical properties. According to Carnes & Pins in Skeletal Muscle Tissue Engineering: Biomaterials-Based Strategies for the Treatment of Volumetric Muscle Loss, this approach develops a microenvironment that is more conducive to enhancing tissue regeneration upon implantation, thus restoring full functionality to patients.

== Future Work ==
Current muscle tissue engineering trends lead towards the development of skeletal muscle regeneration techniques over smooth muscle or cardiac muscle regeneration. A current trend found throughout literature is the treatment of Volumetric Muscle Loss (VML) using muscle tissue engineering techniques. VML is the result of abrupt loss of skeletal muscle due to surgical resection, trauma, or combat injuries. It has been observed that tissue grafts, the current treatment plan, do not restore full functionality or aesthetic integrity to the site of injury. Muscle tissue engineering offers an optimistic possibility for patients, as in situ, in vivo, and in vitro techniques have been proven to restore functionality to muscle tissue in the wound site. Methods being explored include acellular scaffold implantation, cell-seeded scaffold implantation, and in vitro fabrication of muscle grafts. Preliminary data from each of these methods promises a solution for patients suffering from VML.

Beyond specific technological advances in the field of muscle tissue engineering, researchers are working to establish a connection with the larger umbrella that is tissue engineering.
