= Acellular dermis =

Acellular dermis is a type of biomaterial derived from processing human or animal tissues to remove cells and retain portions of the extracellular matrix (ECM). These materials are typically cell-free, distinguishing them from classical allografts and xenografts, can be integrated or incorporated into the body, and have been FDA approved for human use for more than 10 years in a wide range of clinical indications.

== Harvesting and processing ==
All ECM samples originate from mammalian tissues, such as dermis, pericardium, and small intestinal submucosa (SIS). After explantation from the source, the ECM biomaterial retains some characteristics of the original tissue. The ECM tissues can be harvested from varying stages in the developmental stages in mammalian species such as human, porcine, equine, and bovine. Although they are similarly composed of fibril collagen, the microstructure, specific composition (including presence of non-collagenous protein and glycosaminoglycans and ratio of different types of collagen), physical dimensions and mechanical properties can differ. Depending on the developmental stage of the tissue during which harvesting occurred, the microstructure can vary within an organism. Additionally, keeping in mind the size and shape of the final tissue, the potential of the physical dimensions of the tissue of origin must be considered.

Despite this “memory” of the ECM tissue, methods have been engineered so that these innate characteristics can be modified, saved or removed. The modification process varies depending on the material used in clinical setting. Some ECM biomaterials undergo a modification that removes all the cells but leaves the remainder of the other ECM components called decellularization. Another process that can be introduced into the biomaterial is artificial crosslinking. Artificial crosslinking has been shown to stabilize reconstituted collagen, which can rapidly degenerate in vivo. Although mechanical strength is gained, the artificial crosslinks that are added increase the chance for a host-cell rejection, due to its foreign origin. Due to this complication, intentional crosslinking is no longer practiced as more recent advancements have been made that increase the lifespan of the collagen without the use of artificial stabilization. Finally, to ensure the ECM biomaterial is without infectious bacteria and viruses, most are terminally sterilized. This can include ethylene oxide (EO) gas, gamma irradiation, or electron beam (e-beam) irradiation as the sterilizing agent.

Decellularized ECM biomaterials can be further processed into a fine powder and then lyophilized (freeze-dried). This powder can then be mixed with collagenase to form an ECM derived hydrogel (self-healing hydrogels). These hydrogels are then used in cell culture to help maintain cell phenotype and increase cell proliferation. Cells cultured on ECM hydrogels maintain their phenotype better than cells cultured on other substrates such as matrigel or type 1 collagen. Though hydrogels do not yet have direct clinical relevance, they have shown promise as a method of assisting in organ regeneration.

Similarly, whole organs can be decellularized to create 3-D ECM scaffolds. These scaffolds can then be re-cellularized in an attempt to regenerate whole organs for transplant. This method works primarily for organs with a complex vasculature, as it allows detergent to be fully perfused through the material.

== Host/implant interactions ==
Wound healing of the skin and tendons is a complex coordinated process in the body that happens slowly over weeks or even years. A number of products in the market today aim to affect this process positively, although little data is available on their success. The majority of products are still in the development phases where the (often inflammatory) interactions between the host and the implanted devices are being assessed.

Implanted ECM biomaterials fall into two general categories based on how they interact with the host. Incorporating devices eventually allow the growth of cells and passage of blood vessels through the matrix, whereas nonincorporating biomaterials are encapsulated by a wall of fused macrophages. In nonincorporating biomaterials such as Permacol, an acellular porcine dermal implant for hernia repair, it is important that the material is not degraded or infiltrated by the immune system. Encapsulated biomaterials that are recognized as foreign can be degraded and/or rejected by the body and migrate to the outside of the body. In incorporated ECM biomaterials, infiltration by the immune system can occur in as few as seven days, leading to rapid degradation of the device volume. In the case of Graftjacket, an allograft from human dermis, the matrix is quickly populated by host cells as vasculature. The device itself decreased more than 60% in volume, and is replaced with host fibroblasts and macrophages.

== Applications ==
ECM biomaterials are used to promote healing in a number of tissues, especially the skin and tendons. Surgimend, a collagen matrix derived from fetal bovine dermis, can trigger the healing of tendons (which do not heal spontaneously) in the ankle. This intervention can shorten healing time by almost half and allows the patient to return to full activity much sooner. Open wounds, like tendons, do not spontaneously heal and can persist for long stretches of time. When ECM biomaterials are added in multiple layers to the ulcer, the wound begins to close quickly and generates host tissue. Although preliminary studies seem promising, little information is available on the success of and direct comparisons between different ECM biomaterial devices in human trials.

Alloderm, an acellular dermis derived from the skin of donated cadavers, is used in reconstructive and dental surgeries. In gingival grafts, the acellular dermis is an alternative to tissue cut from the palate of the patient's mouth. It has also been used for abdominal hernia repair, and to rebuild resected turbinates in the treatment of empty nose syndrome. Alloderm and other acellular dermal matrices are used routinely in implant based breast reconstruction after mastectomy for improved soft tissue coverage and thus decrease the risk of visible rippling, capsular contraction, implant malposition, bottoming out and implant exposure.

The FDA has not approved any acellular dermal matrix products for use in implant-based breast reconstruction following surgery to remove a breast tumour, as the published literature suggests that different ADM products may have different risk profiles, thus clinical results may not be consistent.

== Examples ==
- Human dermis
- Small intestinal submucosa
- Bovine dermis
- Porcine dermis
- Human Demineralized Bone Matrix
- Equine pericardium
- Bovine pericardium
- Chitin shell
- Dura mater
- Alloderm
