= In vivo bioreactor =

Tissue engineering paradigm

The in vivo bioreactor is a tissue engineering paradigm that uses bioreactor methodology to grow neotissue in vivo that augments or replaces malfunctioning native tissue. Tissue engineering principles are used to construct a confined, artificial bioreactor space in vivo that hosts a tissue scaffold and key biomolecules necessary for neotissue growth. Said space often requires inoculation with pluripotent or specific stem cells to encourage initial growth, and access to a blood source. A blood source allows for recruitment of stem cells from the body alongside nutrient delivery for continual growth. This delivery of cells and nutrients to the bioreactor eventually results in the formation of a neotissue product.

== Overview ==
Conceptually, the in vivo bioreactor was borne from complications in a repair method of bone fracture, bone loss, necrosis, and tumor reconstruction known as bone grafting. Traditional bone grafting strategies require fresh, autologous bone harvested from the iliac crest; this harvest site is limited by the amount of bone that can safely be removed, as well as associated pain and morbidity. Other methods include cadaverous allografts and synthetic options (often made of hydroxyapatite) that have become available in recent years. In response to the question of limited bone sourcing, it has been posited that bone can be grown to fit a damaged region within the body through the application of tissue engineering principles.

Tissue engineering is a biomedical engineering discipline that combines biology, chemistry, and engineering to design neotissue (newly formed tissue) on a scaffold. Tissues scaffolds are functionally identical to the extracellular matrix found, acting as a site upon which regenerative cellular components adsorb to encourage cellular growth. This cellular growth is then artificially stimulated by additive growth factors in the environment that encourage tissue formation. The scaffold is often seeded with stem cells and growth additives to encourage a smooth transition from cells to tissues, and more recently, organs. Traditionally, this method of tissue engineering is performed in vitro, where scaffold components and environmental manipulation recreate in vivo stimuli that direct growth. Environmental manipulation includes changes in physical stimulation, pH, potential gradients, cytokine gradients, and oxygen concentration. The overarching goal of in vitro tissue engineering is to create a functional tissue that is equivalent to native tissue in terms of composition, biomechanical properties, and physiological performance. However, in vitro tissue engineering suffers from a limited ability to mimic in vitro conditions, often leading to inadequate tissue substitutes. Therefore, in vivo tissue engineering has been suggested as a method to circumvent the tedium of environmental manipulation and use native in vivo stimuli to direct cell growth. To achieve in vivo tissue growth, an artificial bioreactor space must be established in which cells may grow. The in vivo bioreactor depends on harnessing the reparative qualities of the body to recruit stem cells into an implanted scaffold, and utilize vasculature to supply all necessary growth components.

== Design ==
=== Cells ===
Tissue engineering done in vivo is capable of recruiting local cellular populations into a bioreactor space. Indeed a range of neotissue growth has been shown: bone, cartilage, fat, and muscle. In theory, any tissue type could be grown in this manner if all necessary components (growth factors, environmental and physical ques) are met. Recruitment of stem cells require a complex process of mobilization from their niche, though research suggests that mature cells transplanted upon the bioreactor scaffold can improve stem cell recruitment. These cells secrete growth factors that promote repair and can be co-cultured with stem cells to improve tissue formation.

=== Scaffolds ===
Scaffold materials are designed to enhance tissue formation through control of the local and surrounding environments. Scaffolds are critical in regulating cellular growth and provide a volume in which vascularization and stem cell differentiation can occur. Scaffold geometry significantly affects tissue differentiation through physical growth ques. Predicting tissue formation computationally requires theories that link physical growth ques to cell differentiation. Current models rely on mechano-regulation theory, widely shaped by Prendergast et al. for predicting cell growth. Thus a quantitative analysis of geometry and materials commonly used in tissue scaffolds is capable.

Such materials include:

- Porous ceramic and demineralized bone matrix supports
- Coralline cylinders
- Biodegradable material such as poly(α-hydroxy esters)
- Decellularized tissue matrices
- Injectable biomaterials or hydrogels are typically composed of polysaccharides, proteins/peptide mimetics, or synthetic polymers such as (poly(ethylene glycol)).
- Peptide amphiphile (PA) systems are self assembling and can form solid bioactive scaffolds after injection within the body.
- Inert systems have been proven to be adequate for tissue formation. Cartilage formation has occurred by injecting an inert agarose gel beneath the periosteum in a rabbit model, vascularization was restricted.
- fibrin
- Sponges made from collagen

=== Bioreactors ===
==== Methods ====
Initially, focusing on bone growth, subcutaneous pockets were used for bone prefabrication as a simple in vivo bioreactor model. The pocket is an artificially created space between varying levels of subcutaneous fascia. The location provides regenerative ques to the bioreactor implant but does not rely on pre-existing bone tissue as a substrate. Furthermore, these bioreactors may be wrapped with muscle tissue to encourage vascularization and bone growth. Another strategy is through the use of a periosteal flap wrapped around the bioreactor, or the scaffold itself to create an in vivo bioreactor. This strategy utilizes the guided bone regeneration treatment scheme, and is a safe method for bone prefabrication. These 'flap' methods of packing the bioreactor within fascia, or wrapping it in tissue is effective, though somewhat random due to the non-directed vascularization these methods incur. The axial vascular bundle (AVB) strategy requires that an artery and vein are inserted in an in vitro bioreactor to transport growth factors, cells, and remove waste. This ultimately results in extensive vascularization of the bioreactor space and a vast improvement in growth capability. This vascularization, though effective, is limited by the surface contact that it can achieve between the scaffold and the capillaries filling the bioreactor space. Thus, a combination of the flap and AVB techniques can maximize the growth rate and vascular contact of the bioreactor as suggested by Han and Dai, by inserting a vascular bundle into a scaffold wrapped in either musculature or periosteum. If inadequate pre-existing vasculature is present in the growth site due to damage or disease, an arteriovenous loop (AVL) can be used. The AVL strategy requires a surgical connection be made between an artery of vein to form an arteriovenous fistula which is then placed within an in vitro bioreactor space containing a scaffold. A capillary network will form from this loop and accelerate the vascularization of new tissue.

==== Materials ====
Materials used in the construction of an in vivo bioreactor space vary widely depending on the type of substrate, type of tissue, and mechanical demands of said tissue being grown. At its simplest, a bioreactor space will be created between tissue layers through the use of hydrogel injections to create a bioreactor space. Early models used an impermeable silicone shroud to encase a scaffold, though more recent studies have begun 3D printing custom bioreactor molds to further enhance the mechanical growth properties of the bioreactors. The choice of bioreactor chamber material generally requires that it is nontoxic and medical grade, examples include: "silicon, polycarbonate, and acrylic polymer". Recently both Teflon and titanium have been used in the growth of bone. One study utilized Polymethyl methacrylate as a chamber material and 3D printed hollow rectangular blocks. Yet another study pushed the limits of the in vivo bioreactor by proving that the omentum is suitable as a bioreactor space and chamber. Specifically, highly vascularized and functional bladder tissue was grown within the omentum space.

== Examples ==
An example of the implementation of the IVB approach was in the engineering of autologous bone by injecting calcium alginate in a sub-periosteal location. The periosteum is a membrane that covers the long bones, jawbone, ribs and the skull. This membrane contains an endogenous population of pluripotent cells called the periosteal cells, which are a type of mesenchymal stem cells (MSC), which reside in the cambium layer, i.e., the side facing the bone. A key step in the procedure is the elevation of the periosteum without damaging the cambium surface and to ensure this a new technique called hydraulic elevation was developed.

The choice of the sub-periosteum site is used because stimulation of the cambium layer using transforming growth factor–beta resulted in enhanced chondrogenesis, i.e., formation of cartilage. In development the formation of bone can either occur via a Cartilage template initially formed by the MSCs that then gets ossified through a process called endochondral ossification or directly from MSC differentiation to bone via a process termed intra-membranous ossification. Upon exposure of the periosteal cells to calcium from the alginate gel, these cells become bone cells and start producing bone matrix through the intra-membranous ossification process, recapitulating all steps of bone matrix deposition. The extension of the IVB paradigm to engineering autologous hyaline cartilage was also recently demonstrated. In this case, agarose is injected and this triggers local hypoxia, which then results in the differentiation of the periosteal MSCs into articular chondrocytes, i.e. cells similar to those found in the joint cartilage. Since this processes occurs in a relative short period of less than two weeks and cartilage can remodel into bone, this approach might provide some advantages in treatment of both cartilage and bone loss. The IVB concept needs to be however realized in humans and this is currently being undertaken.

== See also ==
- Biomedical engineering
- Tissue engineering
- Bioreactor
- Bone Grafting
- Guided Bone and Tissue Regeneration
