= Thorsten Walles =

German university teacher

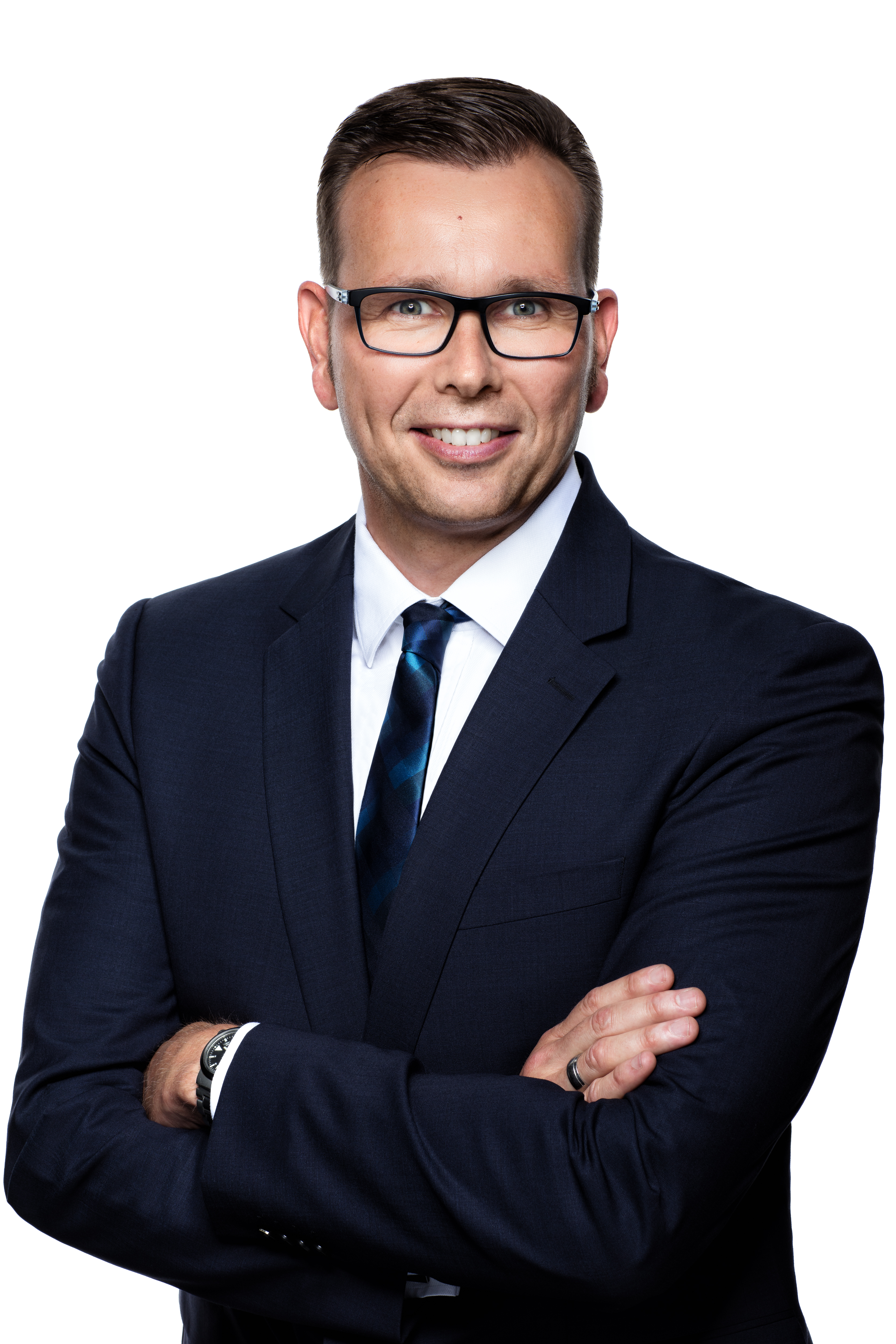
- Born: 28 June 1972 (age 54); Lingen, Germany
- Known for: trachea surgery and research for early diagnosis of lung cancer
- Scientific career
- Fields: Thoracic surgery
- Workplaces: University of Würzburg

Thorsten Walles (born 28 June 1972 in Lingen) is a German general thoracic surgeon and professor at the University Hospital of Würzburg. He is known for his works in the field of trachea surgery and his research for early diagnosis of lung cancer.

== Biography ==
Walles studied medicine at the Hannover Medical School from 1993 to 2000. During his dissertation he spent a research fellowship at the Johns Hopkins University from 1997 to 1998. He earned his doctorate at the Hannover Medical School in 2000 summa cum laude. Walles completed his specialist training in thoracic surgery at various established thoracic surgery units in 2008 and is recognized as Fellow of the European Board of Thoracic and Cardiovascular Surgeons. He was visiting scientist at the Fraunhofer-Institute for Interfacial Engineering and Biotechnology in Stuttgart from 2005 to 2012. He received the habilitation at the University of Tübingen in 2009. In 2010 he became senior physician at the Clinic Schillerhöhe (Stuttgart). He was appointed professor for thoracic surgery at the medical faculty of the University of Würzburg in 2012, where he is heading the section of Thoracic Surgery since 2012.

Walles is married to the biologist Heike Walles.

== Scientific contributions ==
Walles works on regenerative medicine and tissue engineering research. Being a thoracic surgeon, he focused on the generation of bioartificial airway tissues for tracheo-bronchial replacement. His work resulted in the first clinical applications of bioartificial tissues for airway reconstruction. In their follow-up of these first transplanted patients Walles and his coworkers demonstrated a post-transplant tissue maturation process of the bioartificial tissues. Pioneering the translation of bioartificial human tissues into clinical applications, he dealt with the legal framework for tissue engineering and regenerative medicine in Germany and Europe. As a specialist in lung cancer treatment Walles could also demonstrate that lung cancer can be detected in the patients' breath. The objective of his ongoing research is the development of technical devices for lung cancer screening.

== Honors and awards ==
- 1998 Scholarship of the Carl Duisberg Foundation and of German Academic Exchange Service (DAAD) for the Biomedical Exchange Program
- 2002 Young Investigator Award of the World Heart Federation
- 2003 Young Researcher Award of the European Society of Artificial Organs (ESAO)
- 2003 Young Investigator Award of the European Association for Cardio- Thoracic Surgery (EACTS)
- 2010 Von-Langenbeck Award of the Deutsche Gesellschaft für Chirurgie (DGCH)

== See also ==
- Artificial trachea
- Biomedical engineering
