= Molecular processor =

A molecular processor is a processor that is based on a molecular platform rather than on an inorganic semiconductor in integrated circuit format.

== Current technology ==
Molecular processors are currently in their infancy and currently only a few exist. At present a basic molecular processor is any biological or chemical system that uses a complementary DNA (cDNA) template to form a long chain amino acid molecule. A key factor that differentiates molecular processors is "the ability to control output" of protein or peptide concentration as a function of time. Simple formation of a molecule becomes the task of a chemical reaction, bioreactor or other polymerization technology. Current molecular processors take advantage of cellular processes to produce amino acid based proteins and peptides. The formation of a molecular processor currently involves integrating cDNA into the genome and should not replicate and re-insert, or be defined as a virus after insertion. Current molecular processors are replication incompetent, non-communicable and cannot be transmitted from cell to cell, animal to animal or human to human. All must have a method to terminate if implanted. The most effective methodology for insertion of cDNA (template with control mechanism) uses capsid technology to insert a payload into the genome. A viable molecular processor is one that dominates cellular function by re-task and or reassignment but does not terminate the cell. It will continuously produce protein or produce on demand and have method to regulate dosage if qualifying as a "drug delivery" molecular processor. Potential applications range from up-regulation of functional CFTR in cystic fibrosis and hemoglobin in sickle cell anemia to angiogenesis in cardiovascular stenosis to account for protein deficiency (used in gene therapy.)

== Example ==
A vector inserted to form a molecular processor is described in part. The objective was to promote angiogenesis, blood vessel formation and improve cardiovasculature. Vascular endothelial growth factor (VEGF) and enhanced green fluorescent protein (EGFP) cDNA was ligated to either side of an internal ribosomal re-entry site (IRES) to produce inline production of both the VEGF and EGFP proteins. After in vitro insertion and quantification of integrating units (IUs), engineered cells produce a bioluminescent marker and a chemotactic growth factor. In this instance, increased fluorescence of EGFP is used to show VEGF production in individual cells with active molecular processors. The production was exponential in nature and regulated through use of an integrating promoter, cell numbers, the number of integrated units (IUs) of molecular processors and or cell numbers. The measure the molecular processors efficacy was performed by FC/FACS to indirectly measure VEGF through fluorescence intensity. Proof of functional molecular processing was quantified by ELISA to show VEGF effect through chemotactic and angiogenesis models. The result involved directed assembly and coordination of endothelial cells for tubule formation by engineered cells on endothelial cells. The research goes on to show implantation and VEGF with dosage capabilities to promote revascularization, validating mechanisms of molecular processor control.

== See also ==
- Biocomputers
- Computational gene
- DNA computing
- List of emerging technologies
- Molecular electronics
- Organic semiconductor
