= Decellularization =

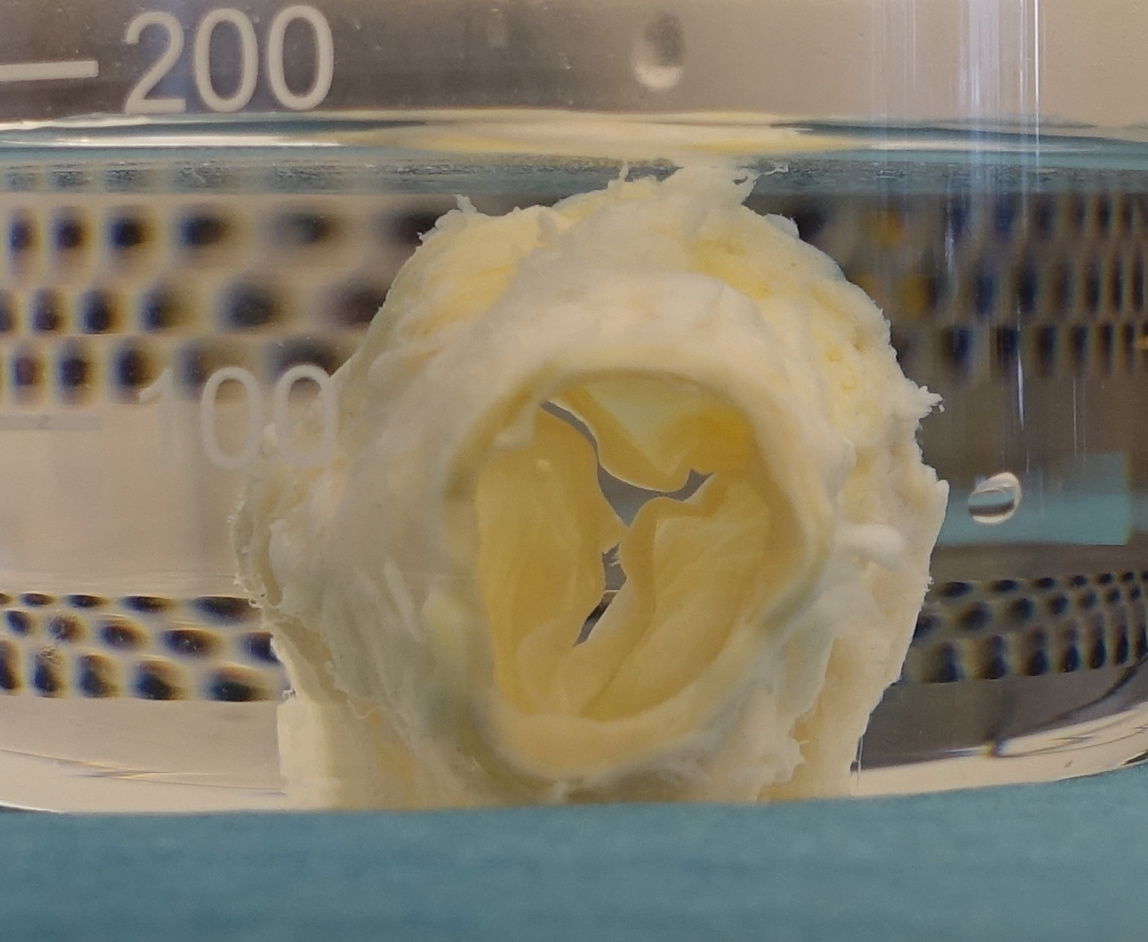
A decellularized aortic homograft

Decellularization (also spelled decellularisation in British English) is the process used in biomedical engineering to isolate the extracellular matrix (ECM) of a tissue from its inhabiting cells, leaving an ECM scaffold of the original tissue, which can be used in artificial organ and tissue regeneration. Organ and tissue transplantation treat a variety of medical problems, ranging from end organ failure to cosmetic surgery. One of the greatest limitations to organ transplantation derives from organ rejection caused by antibodies of the transplant recipient reacting to donor antigens on cell surfaces within the donor organ. Because of unfavorable immune responses, transplant patients suffer a lifetime taking immunosuppressing medication. Stephen F. Badylak pioneered the process of decellularization at the McGowan Institute for Regenerative Medicine at the University of Pittsburgh. This process creates a natural biomaterial to act as a scaffold for cell growth, differentiation and tissue development. By recellularizing an ECM scaffold with a patient's own cells, the adverse immune response is eliminated. Nowadays, commercially available ECM scaffolds are available for a wide variety of tissue engineering. Using peracetic acid to decellularize ECM scaffolds have been found to be false and only disinfects the tissue.

With a wide variety of decellularization-inducing treatments available, combinations of physical, chemical, and enzymatic treatments are carefully monitored to ensure that the ECM scaffold maintains the structural and chemical integrity of the original tissue. Scientists can use the acquired ECM scaffold to reproduce a functional organ by introducing progenitor cells, or adult stem cells (ASCs), and allowing them to differentiate within the scaffold to develop into the desired tissue. The produced organ or tissue can be transplanted into a patient. In contrast to cell surface antibodies, the biochemical components of the ECM are conserved between hosts, so the risk of a hostile immune response is minimized. Proper conservation of ECM fibers, growth factors, and other proteins is imperative to the progenitor cells differentiating into the proper adult cells. The success of decellularization varies based on the components and density of the applied tissue and its origin. The applications to the decellularizing method of producing a biomaterial scaffold for tissue regeneration are present in cardiac, dermal, pulmonary, renal, and other types of tissues. Complete organ reconstruction is still in the early levels of development.

== Process overview ==
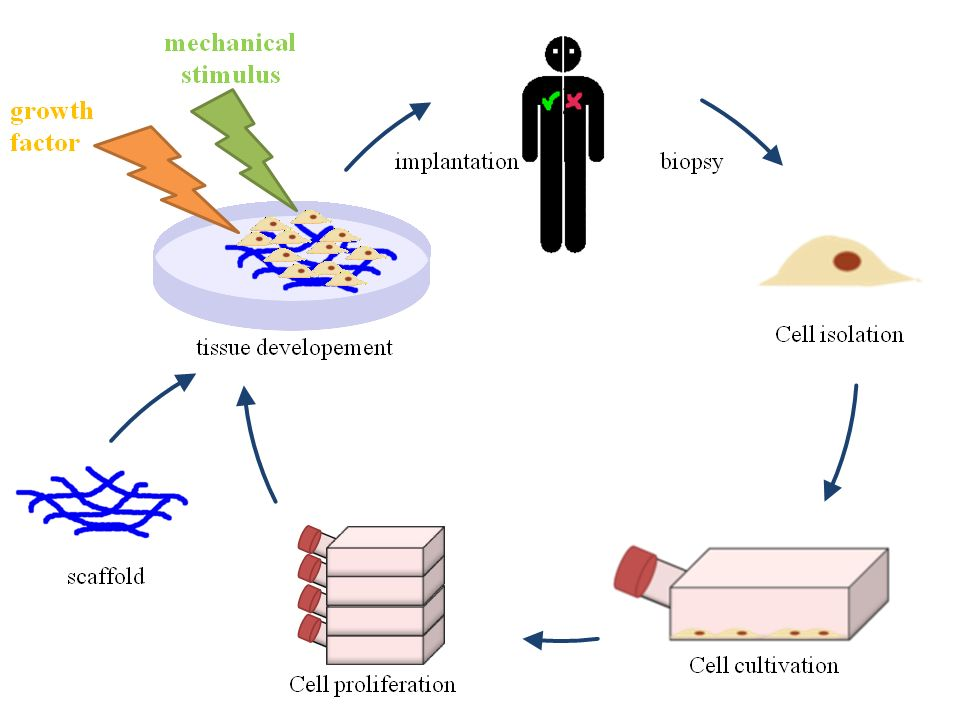
Principle of tissue engineering

Researchers are able to take the tissue from a donor or cadaver, lyse and kill the cells within the tissue without damaging the extracellular components, and finish with a product that is the natural ECM scaffold that has the same physical and biochemical functions of the natural tissue. After acquiring the ECM scaffold, scientists can recellularize the tissue with potent stem or progenitor cells that will differentiate into the original type of tissue. By removing the cells from a donor tissue, the immunogenic antibodies from the donor will be removed. The progenitor cells can be taken from the host, therefore they will not have an adverse response to the tissue. This process of decellularizing tissues and organs is still being developed, but the exact process of taking a tissue from a donor and removing all the cellular components is considered to be the decellularization process. The steps to go from a decellularized ECM scaffold to a functional organ is under the umbrella of recellularization. Because of the diverse applications of tissue in the human body, decellularization techniques have to be tailored to the specific tissue being exercised on. The researched methods of decellularization include physical, chemical, and enzymatic treatments. Though some methods are more commonly used, the exact combination of treatments is variable based on the tissue's origin and what it is needed for.

As far as introducing the different liquidized chemicals and enzymes to an organ or tissue, perfusion and immersion decellularization techniques have been used. Perfusion decellularization is applicable when an extensive vasculature system is present in the organ or tissue. It is crucial for the ECM scaffold to be decellularized at all levels, and evenly throughout the structure. Because of this requirement, vascularized tissues can have chemicals and enzymes perfused through the present arteries, veins, and capillaries. Under this mechanism and proper physiological conditions, treatments can diffuse equally to all of the cells within the organ. The treatments can be removed through the veins at the end of the process. Cardiac and pulmonary decellularization often uses this process of decellularization to introduce the treatments because of their heavily vascularized networks. Immersion decellularization is accomplished through the submersion of a tissue in chemical and enzymatic treatments. This process is more easily accomplished than perfusion, but is limited to thin tissues with a limited vascular system.

== Physical treatments ==
The most common physical methods used to lyse, kill, and remove cells from the matrix of a tissue through the use of temperature, force and pressure, and electrical disruption. Temperature methods are often used in a rapid freeze-thaw mechanism. By quickly freezing a tissue, microscopic ice crystals form around the plasma membrane and the cell is lysed. After lysing the cells, the tissue can be further exposed to liquidized chemicals that degrade and wash out the undesirable components. Temperature methods conserve the physical structure of the ECM scaffold, but are best handled by thick, strong tissues.

Direct force of pressure to a tissue will guarantee disruption of the ECM structure, so pressure is commonly used. Pressure decellularization involves the controlled use of hydrostatic pressure applied to a tissue or organ. This is done best at high temperatures to avoid unmonitored ice crystal formation that could damage the scaffold. Electrical disruption of the plasma membrane is another option to lyse the cells housed in a tissue or organ. By exposing a tissue to electrical pulses, micropores are formed at the plasma membrane. The cells eventually turn to death after their homeostatic electrical balance is ruined through the applied stimulus. This electrical process is documented as non-thermal irreversible electroporation (NTIRE) and is limited to small tissues and the limited possibilities of inducing an electric current in vivo.

== Chemical treatments ==
The proper combination of chemicals is selected for decellularization depending on the thickness, extracellular matrix composition, and intended use of the tissue or organ. For example, enzymes would not be used on a collagenous tissue because they disrupt the connective tissue fibers. However, when collagen is not present in a high concentration or needed in the tissue, enzymes can be a viable option for decellularization. The chemicals used to kill and remove the cells include acids, alkaline treatments, ionic detergents, non-ionic detergents, and zwitterionic detergents.

The ionic detergent, sodium dodecyl sulfate (SDS), is commonly used because of its high efficacy for lysing cells without significant damage to the ECM. Detergents act effectively to lyse the cell membrane and expose the contents to further degradation. After SDS lyses the cell membrane, endonucleases and exonucleases degrade the genetic contents, while other components of the cell are solubilized and washed out of the matrix. SDS is commonly used even though it has a tendency to slightly disrupt the ECM structure. Alkaline and acid treatments can be effective companions with an SDS treatment due to their ability to degrade nucleic acids and solubilize cytoplasmic inclusions.

The most well known non-ionic detergent is Triton X-100, which is popular because of its ability to disrupt lipid-lipid and lipid-protein interactions. Triton X-100 does not disrupt protein-protein interactions, which is beneficial to keeping the ECM intact. EDTA is a chelating agent that binds calcium, which is a necessary component for proteins to interact with one another. By making calcium unavailable, EDTA prevents the integral proteins between cells from binding to one another. EDTA is often used with trypsin, an enzyme that acts as a protease to cleave the already existing bonds between integral proteins of neighboring cells within a tissue. Together, the EDTA-Trypsin combination make a good team for decellularizing tissues.

== Enzymatic treatments ==
Enzymes used in decellularization treatments are used to break the bonds and interactions between nucleic acids, interacting cells through neighboring proteins, and other cellular components. Lipases, thermolysin, galactosidase, nucleases, and trypsin have all been used in the removal of cells. After a cell is lysed with a detergent, acid, physical pressure, etc., endonucleases and exonucleases can begin the degradation of the genetic material. Endonucleases cleave DNA and RNA in the middle of sequences. Benzoase, an endonuclease, produces multiple small nuclear fragments that can be further degraded and removed from the ECM scaffold. Exonucleases act at the end of DNA sequences to cleave the phosphodiester bonds and further degrade the nucleic acid sequences.

Enzymes such as trypsin act as proteases that cleave the interactions between proteins. Although trypsin can have adverse effects of collagen and elastin fibers of the ECM, using it in a time-sensitive manner controls any potential damage it could cause on the extracellular fibers. Dispase is used to prevent undesired aggregation of cells, which is beneficial in promoting their separating from the ECM scaffold. Experimentation has shown dispase to be most effective on the surface of a thin tissue, such as a lung in pulmonary tissue regeneration. To successfully remove deep cells of a tissue with dispase, mechanical agitation is often included in the process.

Collagenase is only used when the ECM scaffold product does not require an intact collagen structure. Lipases are commonly used when decellularized skin grafts are needed. Lipase acids function in decellularizing dermal tissues through delipidation and cleaving the interactions between heavily lipidized cells. The enzyme, α-galactosidase is a relevant treatment when removing the Gal epitope antigen from cell surfaces.

== Applications ==
Decellularized-Matrix-from-Tumorigenic-Human-Mesenchymal-Stem-Cells-Promotes-Neovascularization-pone.0021888.s001

A natural ECM scaffold provides the necessary physical and biochemical environment to facilitate the growth and specialization of potent progenitor and stem cells. Acellular matrices have been isolated in vitro and in vivo in a number of different tissues and organs. Decellularized ECM can be used to prepare bio-ink for 3D bioprinting. The most applicable success from decellularized tissues has come from symmetrical tissues that have less specialization, such as bone and dermal grafts; however, research and success are ongoing at the organ level.

Acellular dermal matrices have been successful in a number of different applications. For example, skin grafts are used in cosmetic surgery and burn care. The decellularized skin graft provides mechanical support to the damaged area while supporting the development of host-derived connective tissue. Cardiac tissue has clinical success in developing human valves from natural ECM matrices. A technique known as the Ross procedure uses an acellular heart valve to replace a defective valve, allowing native cells to repopulate a newly functioning valve. Decellularized allografts have been critical in bone grafts that function in bone reconstruction and replacing of deformed bones in patients.

The limits to myocardial tissue engineering come from the ability to immediately perfuse and seed and implemented heart into a patient. Though the ECM scaffold maintains the protein and growth factors of the natural tissue, the molecular level specialization has not yet been harnessed by researchers using decellularized heart scaffolds. Better success at using a whole organ from decellularization techniques has been found in pulmonary research. Scientists have been able to regenerate whole lungs in vitro from rat lungs using perfusion-decellularization. By seeding the matrix with fetal rat lung cells, a functioning lung was produced. The in vitro-produced lung was successfully implemented into a rat, which attests to the possibilities of translating an in vitro produced organ into a patient.

Other success for decellularization has been found in small intestinal submucosa (SIS), renal, hepatic, and pancreatic engineering. Because it is a thin material, the SIS matrix can be decellularized through immersing the tissue in chemical and enzymatic treatments. Renal tissue engineering is still developing, but cadaveric kidney matrices have been able to support development of potent fetal kidney cells. Pancreatic engineering is a testament to the molecular specificity of organs. Scientists have not yet been able to produce an entirely functioning pancreas, but they have had success in producing an organ that functions at specific segments. For example, diabetes in rats was shown to decrease by seeding a pancreatic matrix at specific sites. The future applications of decellularized tissue matrix is still being discovered and is considered one of the most hopeful areas in regenerative research.

== See also ==
- Organ transplant
- Regeneration in humans
- Regenerative medicine
- Tissue engineering
- Transplant rejection
