= Christian Cabrol =

French cardiac surgeon

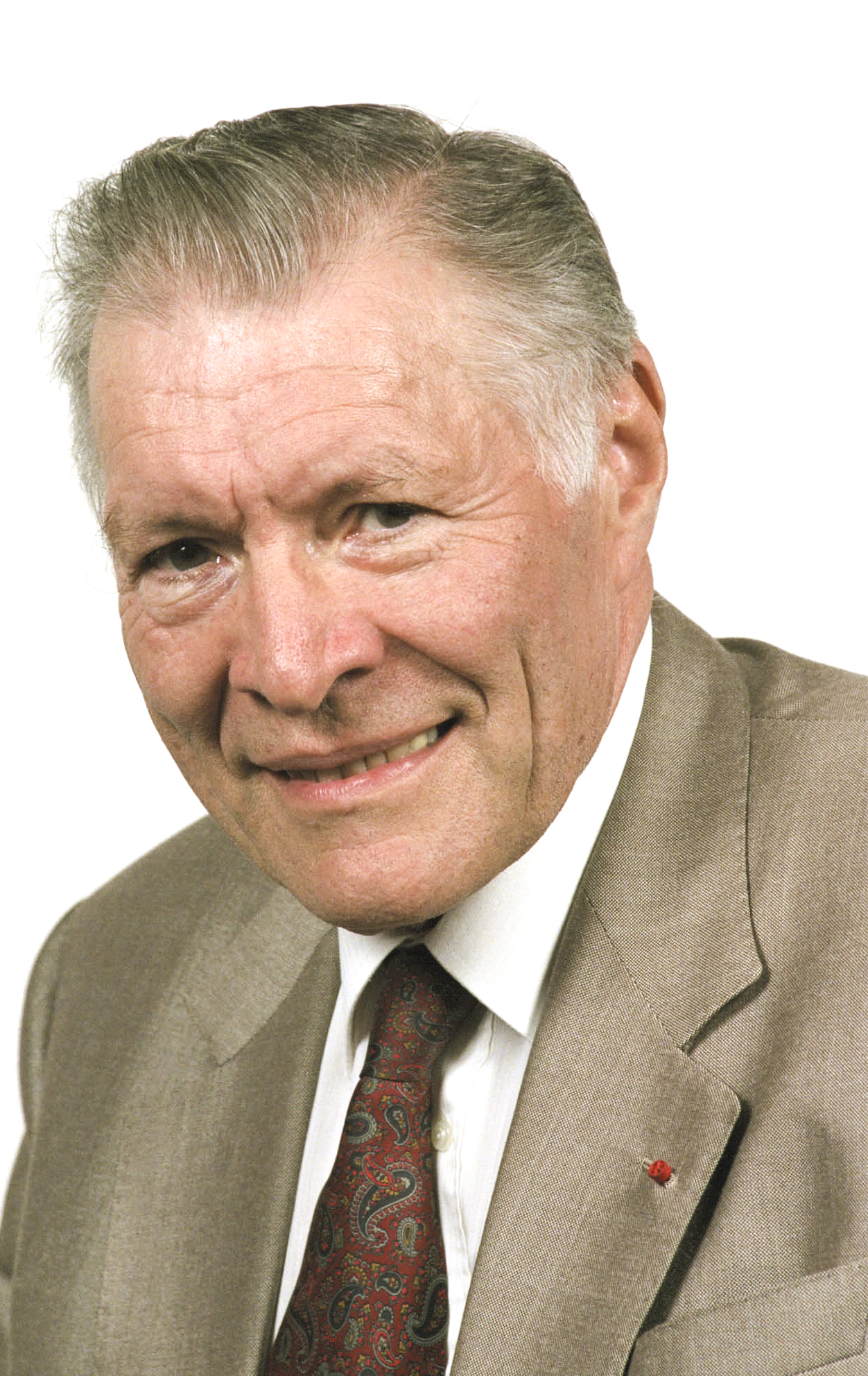
- Official portrait as a Member of the European Parliament, 1994
- Born: Christian Emile Cabrol; 16 September 1925; Chézy-sur-Marne, France
- Died: 16 June 2017 (aged 91); Paris, France
- Education: Pitié-Salpêtrière Hospital
- Occupations: cardiac surgeon; Member of the European Parliament (1994–1999)
- Known for: Europe's first: heart transplant (1968); heart-lung transplant (1982); implantation of an artificial heart (1986); Valvular heart surgery Opposing tobacco advertising (1998)
- Medical career
- Institutions: Pitié-Salpêtrière Hospital
- Sub-specialties: Organ transplantation
- Awards: Legion of Honour; National Order of Merit; ISHLT Pioneer award 2009

Christian Emile Cabrol (16 September 1925 – 16 June 2017) was a French cardiac surgeon best known for performing Europe's first heart transplant at Pitié-Salpêtrière Hospital in 1968.

Cabrol was born in the Chézy-sur-Marne, Aisne region of Northern France. He joined the French Resistance at the onset of the Second World War and after the war gained admission to the Salpêtrière Hospital to study medicine. His thesis on the anatomy of the lung was published in two volumes, following which he completed a fellowship with open heart surgery pioneer Walton Lillehei at the University of Minnesota.

On 27 April 1968, he performed France's and Europe's first heart transplant. In 1982, he performed Europe's first heart–lung transplant and four years later, he implanted Europe's first Jarvik Total Artificial Heart (TAH) as a bridge to transplantation. Throughout his surgical career, he also pioneered techniques in valvular surgery including the tricuspid annuloplasty.

Among numerous appointments and honorary posts, he was involved with the International Society for Heart and Lung Transplantation (ISHLT) from its inception in 1981, becoming its president ten years later. In 1989, he became an active campaigner for organ donation with France Transplant and subsequently co-founded the Association for the Development and Innovation in Cardiology (ADICARE). From 1994 to 1999, Cabrol represented France in the European Parliament and was affiliated with Rally for the Republic. He was named a commandeur of the Legion of Honour and awarded a National Order of Merit for his work.

== Early life ==
Christian Cabrol was born on 16 September 1925 in the Chézy-sur-Marne, Aisne region of Northern France to a family descended from the shepherds of Cévennes. His father was a farmer, who kept bees and grew a vineyard. As a child, Cabrol would accompany his physician paternal grandfather on home visits, ultimately instilling the inspiration to study medicine. His maternal grandfather was a winegrower in a vineyard of Champagne.

He attended Chézy's school in a small town named Château-Thierry north-east of Paris. Thereafter, he was sent to board at the Marist Brothers Saint Laurent College in Lagny on marne, until his education was interrupted by the Second World War. Cabrol subsequently joined the French Resistance movement following Hitler's occupation of Paris on 14 June 1940. Later, he entered Paris with General Leclerc of the Free French Army who liberated the city on 23 August 1944.

== Early surgical training ==
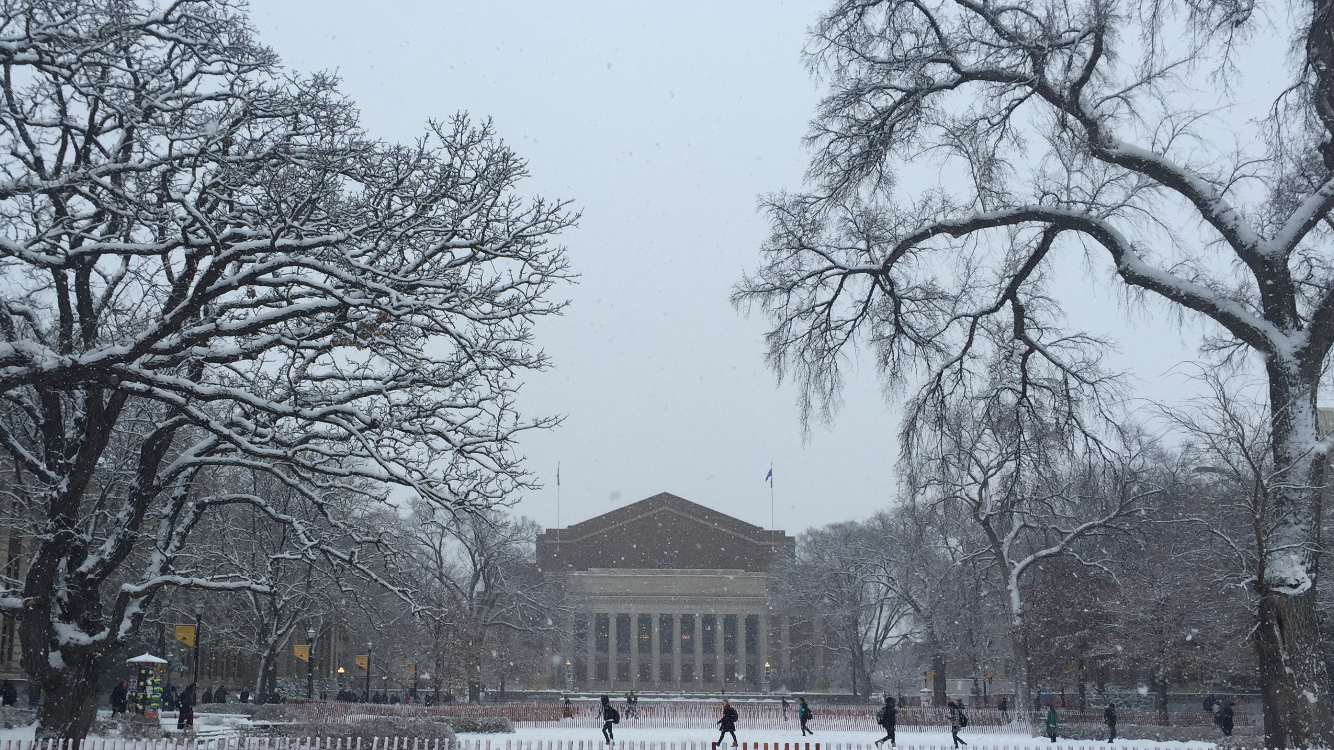
University of Minnesota East Bank campus

After the war, Cabrol gained admission to the Salpêtrière Hospital to study medicine. In 1949, he started his internship and joined professor Gaston-Jean Cordier in 1951, while simultaneously participating in the Laennec conferences. During his four years of internship, he worked with and was influenced by a number of renowned surgeons of the time, including Charles Dubost, Cordier who encouraged thoracic surgery and René Küss who emphasised organ transplantation. The subject of his thesis was the anatomy of the lung. The book on the right lung was published in 1953, and on the left lung in 1955, when he gained his MD. Later, the Salpêtrière would merge with the Hôpital La Pitié to form the Hôpital La Pitié Salpêtrière, where Cabrol spent his remaining surgical career.

In 1956, he became a Fulbright Fellow with Walton Lillehei at Minnesota. Here, he would become acquainted with F. John Lewis, Christiaan Barnard, who had just received permission from Owen Wangensteen to change from gut surgery to cardiac surgery, and Norman Shumway, with whom he remained lifelong friends.

== Heart surgery ==
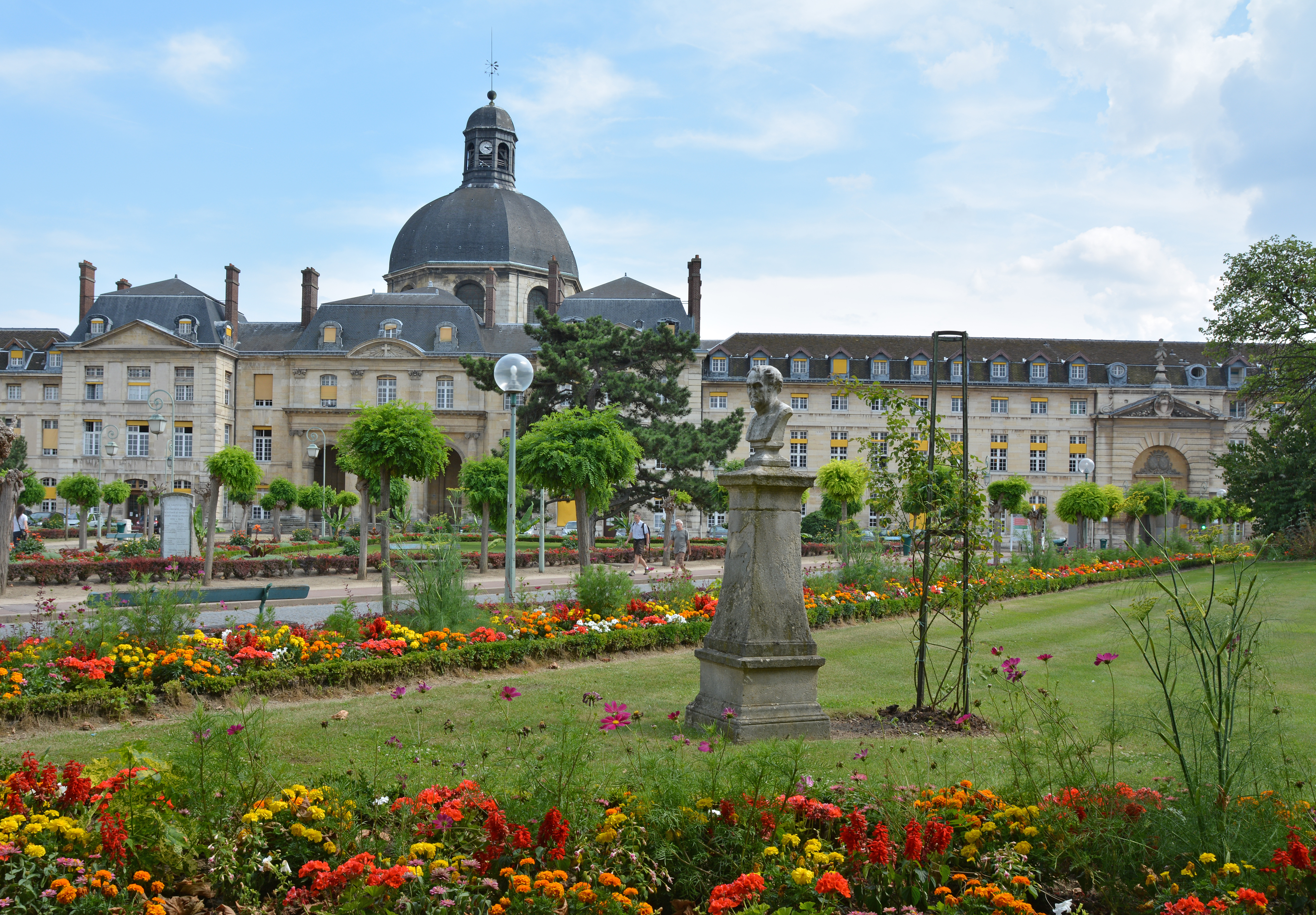
Hôpital La Pitié Salpêtrière, Paris

Expected to return to a post in training under surgeon J. C. Rudler, Cabrol's career changed direction when J. C. Rudler decided to move to Geneva. Cabrol returned to the Hôpital La Pitié Salpêtrière in 1960 as a cardiac surgeon and recreated a replica of Lillehei's experimental laboratory. From 1964, he began to hold numerous consultant and professorship posts including professor at the School of Medicine in Paris in 1964 and the following year, following the death of Cordier in 1965, he was appointed professor of anatomy and held this post for almost 30 years. From 1972 until 1990, he directed the department of cardiac surgery.

=== Heart transplant ===
With the head of department, Maurice Mercadier conveniently away in inaccessible Algiers at the time, Cabrol, with his wife as anaesthetist and assisted by Gérard M. Guiraudon, performed France's and Europe's first heart transplant on 27 April 1968. The recipient, 66 year old Clovis Roblain, whose surgical video footage shows he had a large, swollen, poorly functioning heart, survived 52 hours. He died from a pulmonary embolus.

His transplant programme was one of four worldwide programmes that continued heart transplants through the 1970s, the other three being Stanford University with Norman Shumway, the Groote Schuur Hospital with Christiaan Barnard and the Virginia Commonwealth University in Richmond, Virginia with Richard Lower. During this time, he recalled being visited by Sir Terence English, Jack Copeland and Michael Hess amongst others from around the world.

=== Heart-lung transplant ===
In 1982, one year after visiting Norman Shumway and witnessing his success with a heart-lung transplant, Cabrol performed Europe's first heart–lung transplant with Iradj Gandjbakhch. The recipient, however, died from cytomegalovirus.

Following the introduction of cyclosporine, his unit went on to perform around 200 transplants per year. His wife, Annik, an anaesthetist, monitored the recipients after surgery, looking for early organ rejection via endomyocardial biopsies and followed them up as outpatients.

=== Artificial heart ===
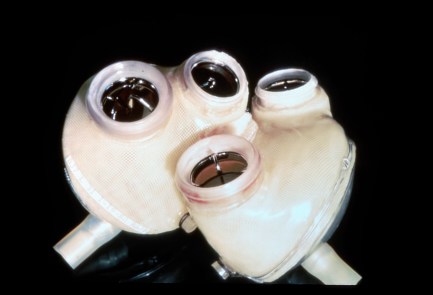
JARVIK 7 TAH, used in 1986 as a bridge-to-transplant

Following the experience of Jack Copeland and after meeting Robert Jarvik himself, Cabrol implanted Europe's first Jarvik Total Artificial Heart (TAH) on 10 April 1986. However, funding limited further developments, until the French newspaper Le Figaro became interested and a grant from King Hassan II was received for further such procedures, an act of philanthropy as a result of Cabrol operating on a member of the Royal Moroccan Family four years earlier. He later recounted that it was the third TAH that he implanted that he considered successful and performed almost 50 of these procedures by 1990, as a bridge to transplant.

=== Other cardiovascular surgery ===
Cabrol pioneered the technique of tricuspid annuloplasty and the repair of ascending aortic aneurysms, coronary and other valve surgery and the treatment of Chronic thromboembolic pulmonary hypertension. He would ultimately perform more than 400 heart transplantations and thousands of heart operations in his lifetime, keeping in communication with numerous cardiothoracic surgeons abroad including Shumway, Barnard, Edward Stinson, Bruce Reitz, Stuart Jamieson and Lillehei.

== Other roles ==
Cabrol was involved with the International Society for Heart and Lung Transplantation (ISHLT) from its inception in 1981. In 1991, he was elected its 7th president, two years after presenting Vladimir Demikhov with the first ISHLT "Pioneer Award" on 25 April 1989 in Munich, Germany.

In 1989, he became president of France Transplant, an organisation active in encouraging organ donation. He was in addition, appointed honorary president of the European Society of Heart Transplantation and president of the Administrative Board of Sainte-Anne Hospital Center.

He co-founded and later became a president of the Association for the Development and Innovation in Cardiology (ADICARE) between 1990 and 2015.

He gave yearly talks at the French-speaking meeting "Journées de La Pitié" which focuses on heart transplantation and mechanical circulatory support.

== Politics ==
In later life, in support of Jacques Chirac, Cabrol became involved in politics. In 1989, he became a Paris City Hall Councilor and was appointed to missions by the Ministry of External Affairs of France in 1993. From 1994 to 1999, Cabrol, as a MEP, represented France in the European Parliament and was affiliated with Rally for the Republic.

Between 1996 and 1999 he was president of the National Food Council (Conseil national de l'alimentation) and was assistant to the Mayor in charge of issues related to food hygiene.

In 1998, Cabrol opposed tobacco advertising when he stated "tobacco kills 500,000 people a year in Europe as a result of lung cancer, heart disease, and other respiratory diseases. Advertising tobacco creates this death rate. Incitement to smoke is incitement to murder."

== Family and personal ==
Cabrol met and married an anaesthetist colleague Annik in 1955. They divorced in 1998 and he then married the 14 years younger actress Bérengère Dautun, whom he had met on a Mediterranean cruise.

His admiration for western movies gave him the nickname "Bill", from Buffalo Bill. He was known for driving his old Citroën car around Paris, but also enjoyed cycling which once resulted in a crash and a broken leg. Unable to walk due to being bed bound with traction, he arranged for his bed to be transferred to his office. While recovering and still unable to stand unaided, he developed a specially designed seat on rollers. This allowed him to continue operating while sitting, an innovation he used for the rest of his surgical career. His other hobbies included sailing.

== Death and legacy ==
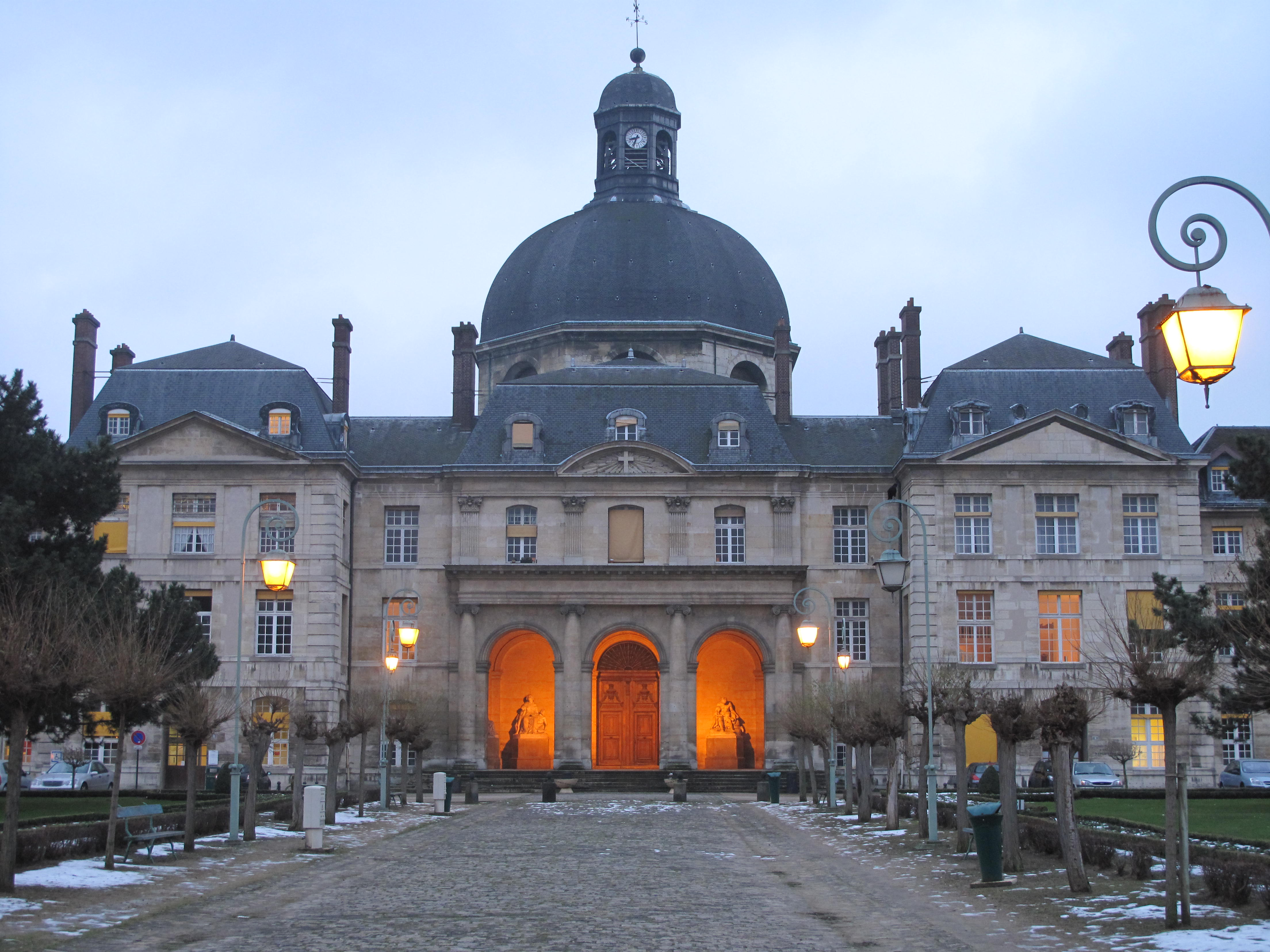
Chapelle Saint-Louis de la Salpêtrière at dawn

Cabrol died on 16 June 2017, at the age of 91, at the hospital at which he spent his cardiothoracic career. His funeral service was held on 22 June 2017 in the Saint-Louis chapel of La Pitié-Salpétrière.

In France, a number of streets and places are named after him.

== Awards and appointments ==
- Member of the National Academy of Surgery in 1970
- Member of the National Academy of Medicine in 1998
- Member of the Institute of France (Academy of Sciences) and the National Academy of Brazil in 2009
- Claude Bernard Award from the city of Paris
- Commander of the Légion d'honneur
- Ordre national du Mérite
- ISHLT "Pioneer Award" in 2009

== Selected publications ==
Cabrol's thesis was on the anatomy of the lung, published in two volumes with the main author reported as Gaston Cordier, as was customary at the time;

- Les pédicules segmentaires du poumon, Volume 1, with Gaston-Jean Cordier, L'Expansion scientifique française (1952).
- Les Pédicules segmentaires du poumon: Tome II. Poumon gauche, with Gaston-Jean Cordier, L'Expansion scientifique française (1955).

He also authored and co-authored numerous articles and books including Mes 400 greffes cardiaques, Plon (1987). Others include;

- "Treatment of aortic insufficiency by means of aortic annuloplasty", co-authored with G. Guiraudon, M. Bertrand and A. Cabrol, Archives des maladies du coeur et des vaisseaux (French) 59:1305–1322, January 1966.
- Cabrol, C (1972). "[Valvular annuloplasty. A new method]". Nouv Presse Med. 1 (20): 1366. PMID 5035881.
- Cabrol, C; Nataf, P; Pavie, A; Bors, V; Vaissier, E; Levasseur, JP; Leger, P; Dorent, R; Cabrol, A; Desruennes, M (1993). "Heart transplantation in 1992: the La Pitié experience". Transplant Proc. 25 (3): 2220–1. PMID 8516877.
- “Briefing for members of the European Parliament on the draft directive to ban all tobacco advertising and sponsorship", European publishers council (1998).
- De tout coeur: la nouvelle chirurgie cardiaque, Odile Jacob (2006), ISBN 978-2-7381-1658-1
- Autobiography; Au cœur de la vie : Itinéraire d’un chirurgien d’exception: Itinéraire d’un, Flammarion (2012), ISBN 978-2-0812-9216-1.
