= Sharon Ann Hunt =

Cardiologist

Sharon Ann Hunt Professor
- Education: Stanford University
- Medical career
- Profession: Cardiologist
- Field: Heart transplant
- Research: Organ rejection
- Awards: 2012, ISHLT Lifetime achievement award; 2013, Hewlett award

Sharon Ann Hunt is a cardiology professor and Director of the Post Heart Transplant Programme in Palo Alto, California and is affiliated with Stanford University Medical Center, professionally known for her work in the care of patients after heart transplantation.

With a career at Stanford spanning over fifty years, Hunt has witnessed the history of heart transplant surgery from the very first one in the US by Norman Shumway in 1968, through the international moratorium on heart transplants and the recent decades of combined heart-lung transplants and mechanical assist devices.

She is a past president of the International Society for Heart and Lung Transplantation and received their lifetime achievement award in 2012.

As one of the 130 cardiology specialists at Stanford, her other activities include contributions to Uptodate and Hurst's Cardiology and more than 200 publications.

== Early life and education ==
Sharon Ann Hunt was brought up in Cleveland, Ohio, and completed her early education from the undergraduate school at the University of Dayton. She spent her summer breaks in a research laboratory at the Cleveland Clinic, sparking her interest in cardiology and subsequent entry to the study of medicine.

Hunt began her medical career as one of seven female students in her class at Stanford in 1967, the year prior to the landmark heart transplant procedure by Norman Shumway.

As a medical student, Hunt became involved in research observing the effects of several drugs on heart muscle cells in tissue culture, a project that introduced her to many of the cardiac trainees at Stanford at that time.

== Medical career ==
Hunt received a medical degree in 1972, completed a residency in internal medicine in 1974, and finished a cardiology fellowship in 1977, all at Stanford University. She achieved internal medicine certification by the American Board of Internal Medicine in 1977 and their cardiovascular disease certification in 1979.

She was mentored by heart transplant pioneer Norman Shumway and pathologist Margaret Billingham and also worked with cardiothoracic surgeon Philip Caves and Edward Stinson, and has therefore witnessed the history of heart transplant surgery in the US from its early years.

=== First heart transplant, 1968 ===
As a second-year medical student, she has recounted the first heart transplant procedure in the US as "groundbreaking...very exciting" when "the whole place was abuzz with the news of it". She recalls the poor survival rates and the vast public interest which led members of the press to climb the outside of the hospital to try to get pictures inside the hospital.

=== Organ rejection ===
During the late 1970s, as Hunt was completing her training, the one-year survival rates for heart transplant surgery was around 60%. Post-operative care of heart transplant patients, with long-term immunosuppression, was a new and evolving field with as yet unknown complications and problems. Over the previous decade, surgical techniques, including endomyocardial biopsy use for early transplant rejection, were improved at Stanford, under Norman Shumway. The care of people who had survived the initial stages of heart transplant surgery became the focus of Hunt's research and work. Continuing the work in the recognising of and the treating of rejection, she also looked at methods in lessening drug side effects.

She later recalled;

When patients started living longer, the surgeons felt they needed real doctors to take care of them because they would come in for follow up with all sorts of medical complications of long-term immunosuppression.

Continuing the process, which started in 1973, of monitoring acute rejection after heart transplants by taking biopsies of the heart using a bioptome and then examining the samples under the microscope, has in her professional view been one of the most significant contributions to detecting rejection.

Hunt is known by a number of her colleagues as the "mother of transplant", having been involved in major transplant guidelines including the "2009 Guidelines for the Diagnosis and Management of Heart Failure in Adults”.

In her paper on mechanical circulatory support in 2007, she stated that the grading of “transplant ineligible” at one moment in time is not automatically a permanent decision.

In 2013, Hunt described one-year survival rates of 90% with many living for over thirty years.

=== Mechanical assist devices ===
Hunt was involved in the care of Robert St. Laurent, the case of the world's first successful implantation of an LVAD, as a bridge to transplantation, in 1984. The device used was the “Novacor” (left ventricular assist system), which used an electromechanically driven dual pusher-plate blood pump. Later, the Thoratec HeartMate XVE device became approved with the landmark REMATCH trial.

Hunt wrote the commentary on the REMATCH trial, "Randomized Evaluation of Mechanical Assistance for the Treatment of Congestive Heart Failure", a trial led by Eric A. Rose. This trial intended to assess the suitability of using a LVAD in the long-term in people with end-stage (severe) heart failure who were not suitable for heart transplantation. Just under 130 people with at least three months of (class IV) congestive heart failure, despite maximum tolerated treatment with drugs and who were ineligible for heart transplantation, were recruited and assigned to either fitting with an LVAD or treatment with medicines only, and all co-ordinated by a specialist co-ordination centre. Despite frequent complications of infection, thrombosis, cerebrovascular disease, device malfunction and one left ventricular dysfunction in the LVAD group, they [LVAD group] had a significantly improved survival rate to those that received medication only and where deaths were due to mostly left ventricular dysfunction. Scores on quality of life depended on the questionnaires used.

Although using LVADs as an artificial heart in order to buy time and bridge the gap until a heart transplant was initially for short-term means, some people have kept them for long periods of time and some have been able to wean off the device to recovery.

During that presentation at the American Heart Association 2002 annual meeting, Hunt made it clear that she believed that the REMATCH trial symbolised a basis "for all future trials of mechanical heart replacement.”

=== Appointments ===
Her career subsequently evolved at Stanford and she progressed as clinical instructor and assistant, associate professor and then eventually clinical professor in 1993, becoming professor in the Division of Cardiovascular Medicine.

She is one of the 130 cardiology specialists at Stanford. In 2010 she became board certified in advanced heart failure and transplant cardiology. Heart transplants are a focus of her practice.

=== Organisations ===
Hunt succeeded John Wallwork in 1995 to serve as president of the International Society for Heart & Lung Transplantation from 1995 to 1996. She was succeeded by William Baumgartner.

She is a Master of the American College of Cardiology.

She works with UpToDate and Hurst's The Heart.

== Awards and achievements ==
On 19 April 2012, at the ISHLT 32nd Annual Meeting and Scientific Sessions in Prague, Czech Republic., she was awarded the ISHLT Lifetime achievement award, the fifth recipient of that award. A year later, she received the Hewlett award.

She has published more than 200 peer-reviewed articles. In 2014, the Institute for Scientific Information included Hunt in its ISI Highly Cited database, which lists scientists whose publications have been most often cited by other researchers.

She has chaired joint committees of the American College of Cardiology and American Heart Association which have revised patient care guidelines for heart failure.

== Personal and family ==
Hunt married a psychologist. He died in 2004. She has one daughter who is a police officer in Sacramento.

In her personal time, she spends time with horses, growing orchids, and traveling. She has described the opportunity to travel internationally as a result of her work.

== Selected publications ==
=== Books ===
- Associate editor in Hurst's the Heart, published by McGraw Hill Professional, 2011, ISBN 9780071636483.

=== Papers ===
- Hess Michael L., Hunt Sharon (2017). "Conquering the first hurdles in cardiac transplantation: In the footprints of giants". The Journal of Heart and Lung Transplantation. 36 (12): 1276–1278. doi:10.1016/j.healun.2017.10.007. PMID 29173385.
- Jamieson StuartW, Reitz BruceA, Oyer PhilipE, Billingham Margaret, Modry Dennis, Baldwin John, Stinson EdwardB, Hunt Sharon, Theodore James, Bieber CharlesP, Shumway NormanE (1983). "Combined Heart and Lung Transplantation". The Lancet. 321 (8334): 1130–1132. doi:10.1016/S0140-6736(83)92867-2. PMC 1306494. PMID 6133156. S2CID 10869338.
- Hunt SA (1997). "Pulmonary hypertension in severe congestive heart failure: how important is it?". J Heart Lung Transplant. 16 (6): S13-5. PMID 9229305..
- Wolden SL, Tate DJ, Hunt SA, Strober S, Hoppe RT (1997). "Long-term results of total lymphoid irradiation in the treatment of cardiac allograft rejection". Int J Radiat Oncol Biol Phys. 39 (5): 953–60. doi:10.1016/s0360-3016(97)00504-x. PMID 9392531.
- Robbins Robert C., Barlow Clifford W., Oyer Philip E., Hunt Sharon A., Miller Joan L., Reitz Bruce A., Stinson Edward B., Shumway Norman E. (1999). "Thirty years of cardiac transplantation at stanford university". The Journal of Thoracic and Cardiovascular Surgery. 117 (5): 939–951. doi:10.1016/S0022-5223(99)70375-2. PMID 10220689.
- Chan Michael C.Y, Giannetti Nadia, Kato Tomoko, Kornbluth Murray, Oyer Phil, Valantine Hannah A, Robbins Robert C, Hunt Sharon A (2001). "Severe tricuspid regurgitation after heart transplantation". The Journal of Heart and Lung Transplantation. 20 (7): 709–717. doi:10.1016/S1053-2498(01)00258-3. PMID 11448795.
- Montoya JG, Giraldo LF, Efron B, Stinson EB, Gamberg P, Hunt S, Giannetti N, Miller J, Remington JS (2001). "Infectious complications among 620 consecutive heart transplant patients at Stanford University Medical Center". Clin Infect Dis. 33 (5): 629–40. doi:10.1086/322733. hdl:10818/47479. PMID 11486285.
- Hunt Sharon A (2007). "Mechanical Circulatory Support". Circulation. 116 (5): 461–462. doi:10.1161/CIRCULATIONAHA.107.715300. PMID 17664383.
- Hunt SA (2002). "Comment--the REMATCH trial: Long-term use of a left ventricular assist device for end-stage heart failure". J Card Fail. 8 (2): 59–60. doi:10.1054/jcaf.2002.32944. PMID 12016626.
- Hunt Sharon A., Haddad François (2008). "The Changing Face of Heart Transplantation" (PDF). Journal of the American College of Cardiology. 52 (8): 587–598. doi:10.1016/j.jacc.2008.05.020. PMID 18702960.
- Warner Stevenson Lynne, Hunt Sharon A (2012). "A Bridge Far Enough?". Circulation. 125 (25): 3069–3072. doi:10.1161/CIRCULATIONAHA.112.111948. PMID 22619282.
- Vrtovec B, Haddad F, Pham M, Deuse T, Fearon WF, Schrepfer S, Leon S, Vu T, Valantine H, Hunt SA (2013). "Granulocyte colony-stimulating factor therapy is associated with a reduced incidence of acute rejection episodes or allograft vasculopathy in heart transplant recipients". Transplant Proc. 45 (6): 2406–9. doi:10.1016/j.transproceed.2013.01.106. PMID 23953556.
- Peter S, Hulme O, Deuse T, Vrtovec B, Fearon WF, Hunt S, Haddad F (2013). "ST-elevation myocardial infarction following heart transplantation as an unusual presentation of coronary allograft vasculopathy: a case report". Transplant Proc. 45 (2): 787–91. doi:10.1016/j.transproceed.2012.08.021. PMID 23498821.

=== Guidelines ===
- Hunt SA, Abraham WT, Chin MH; et al. (April 2009). "2009 focused update incorporated into the ACC/AHA 2005 Guidelines for the Diagnosis and Management of Heart Failure in Adults: a report of the American College of Cardiology Foundation/American Heart Association Task Force on Practice Guidelines: developed in collaboration with the International Society for Heart and Lung Transplantation". Circulation. 119 (14): e391–479. doi:10.1161/CIRCULATIONAHA.109.192065. PMID 19324966.
