= Stuart W. Jamieson =

British surgeon

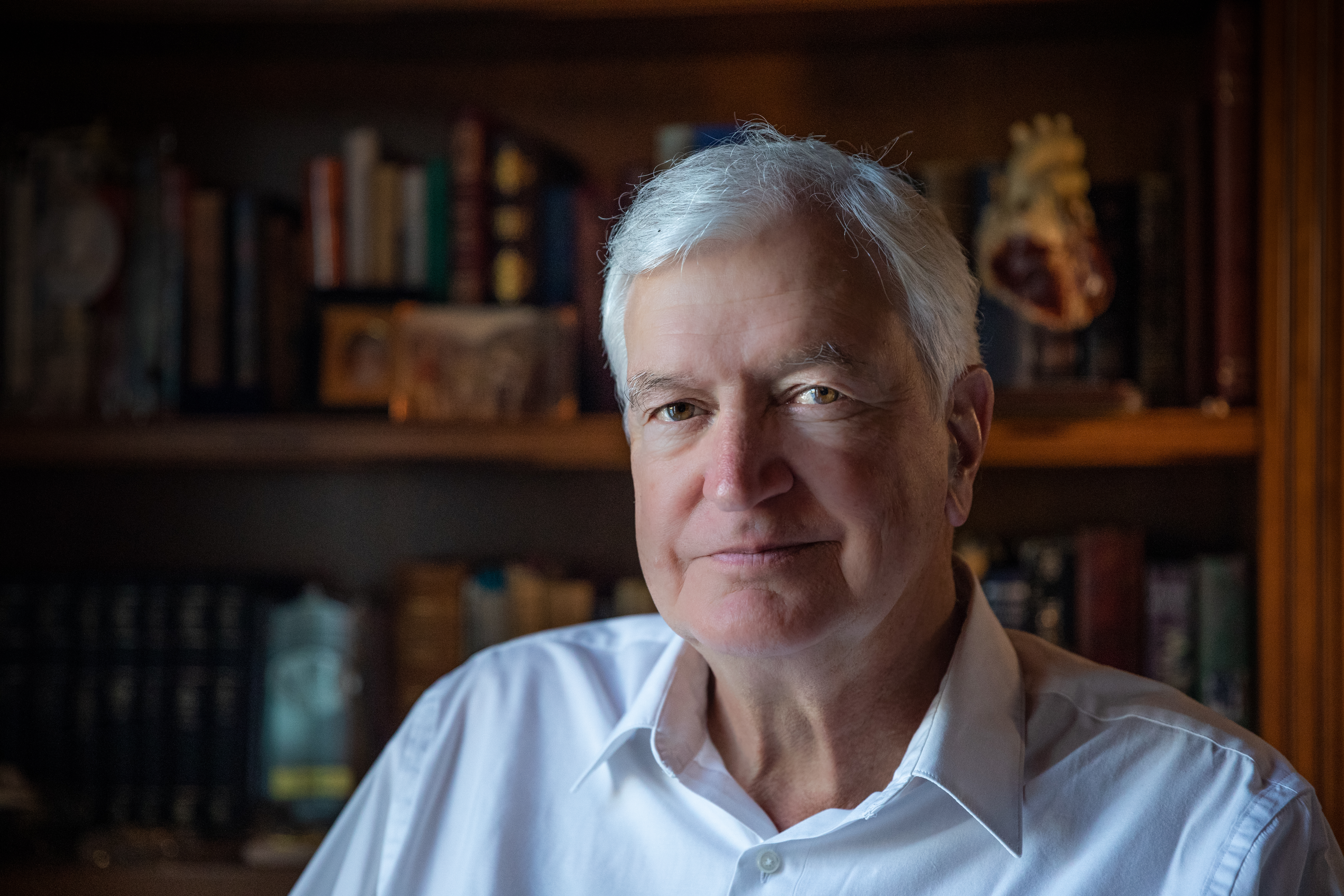
- Stuart Jamieson in his library 2019
- Born: 1947 (age 78–79); Rhodesia
- Education: St Mary's Hospital Medical School, London
- Occupation: Cardiothoracic surgeon
- Years active: 1978–present
- Known for: First to report that chronic thromboembolic pulmonary hypertension (CTEPH) can be corrected with Pulmonary thromboendarterectomy (PTE)
- Medical career
- Notable works: "Cardiac transplantation in 150 patients at Stanford University" BMJ (1979); "Pulmonary endarterectomy: Experience and lessons learned in 1,500 cases" The Annals of Thoracic Surgery (2003)
- Awards: Irvine H. Page Atherosclerosis Research Prize 1978; Ellis Island Medal of Honor 2008; ISHLT Pioneer Award 2017

Stuart William Jamieson FRCS (born 1947) is a British cardiothoracic surgeon, specialising in pulmonary thromboendarterectomy (PTE), a surgical procedure performed to remove organized clotted blood (thrombus) from pulmonary arteries in people with chronic thromboembolic pulmonary hypertension (CTEPH).

In his early career, he wrote on xenograft hyperacute rejection and in December 1980 was part of the team that performed the first successful human heart transplant using the then newly discovered immunosuppressant cyclosporine. In 1981, he was part of Bruce Reitz's team that performed the world's first successful combined heart-lung transplant procedure at Stanford University. Following that, he continued to make significant contributions to heart-lung transplant procedures, and led programmes in cardiothoracic surgery in both adults and children.

In 1986, he was elected president of the International Society for Heart and Lung Transplantation (ISHLT), whilst he was professor and head of cardiothoracic surgery at the University of Minnesota. Later, he became dean of cardiovascular affairs and chair and distinguished professor of surgery at the University of California, San Diego, where he co-founded the Sulpizio Cardiovascular Center.

== Early life and education ==
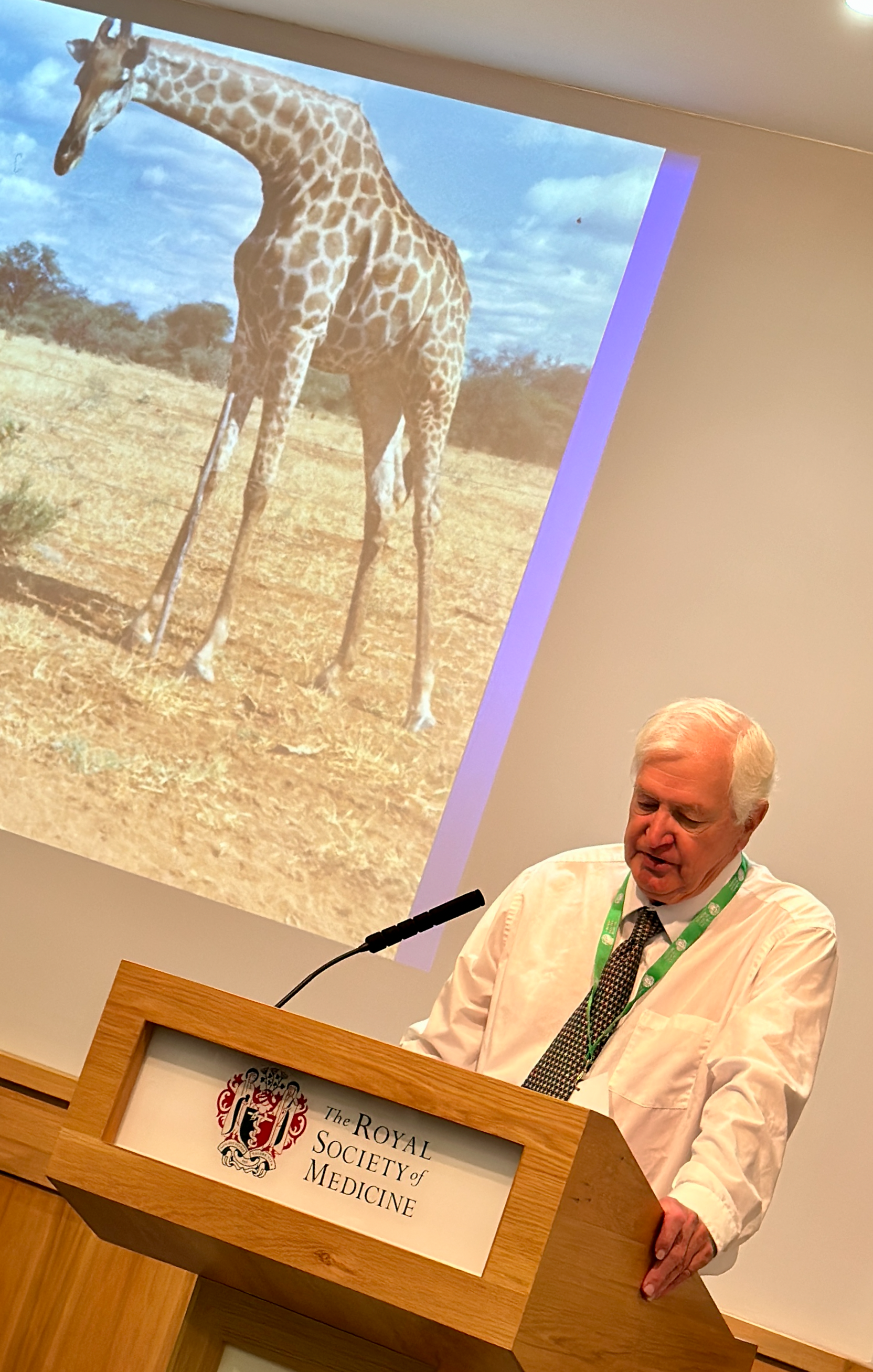
Stuart Jamieson 2023 (his giraffe on screen)

Stuart Jamieson was born in 1947 and brought up in Rhodesia (now Zimbabwe), where he was educated at Falcon College. His childhood was spent on a 2.5 million acre ranch with pets that included a zebra, an ostrich and a giraffe. At the age of 18, Jamieson was sent to St Mary's Hospital, affiliated with the University of London, to study medicine. He financed his studies by working as a waiter.

== Background ==
The first combined heart-lung transplant was accomplished by Denton Cooley in 1968, in Houston, in a two-year-old girl with severe pulmonary hypertension. Despite surviving less than a day, her case showed that this kind of procedure could be effective. The second such transplant was performed in 1969, by C. Walton Lillehei at Cornell University Medical Center in New York City, in a 43-year-old man with emphysema. He lived for eight days. In 1971, South African Christiaan Barnard, also performed a combined heart-lung transplant in a 49-year-old man with emphysema, surviving for 23 days. The poor survival rates of these early transplantations, primarily resulted from inadequate immunosuppression and difficulties with joining the airways. In addition, Joel D. Cooper had found corticosteroids to weaken the bronchial anastomosis. It was on this background of tragic deaths that Jamieson later acknowledged and shared his research on xenograft hyperacute rejection.

== Early surgical career ==
Following 1971's Life Magazine's media coverage of failed early heart transplantations, Jamieson published his first papers on xenograft hyperacute rejection in 1974 and 1975.

In 1978, the American Heart Association awarded him a fellowship to study at Stanford University under the pioneering heart surgeon Norman Shumway, who had performed the first human heart transplant in America in 1967. Jamieson completed his residency in 1980 and stayed on as chief resident at Shumway's request. Later, he was listed in Clinical Cardiology (2000), as one of Norman Shumway's distinguished trainees.

Before 1980, just under 40 lung transplantation procedures had been attempted, all of which resulted in the patient's death within a few months and just one resulted in the patient's discharge from hospital. In 1979 at Stanford, Jamieson performed 25 heart transplants, comprising more than 50 percent of the total performed globally at that time.

In 1979, he described a series of successful transplantations in primates using cyclosporine, a fungal derivative whose immunosuppressive properties were reported by Jean-Francois Borel. Observing Roy Calne's reports on how cyclosporine led to a reduction in acute rejection and consequent longer survival rates following liver and kidney transplantation, Jamieson then demonstrated the possibility of using cyclosporine in human heart-lung transplantations. Subsequently, with Edward Stinson and Norman Shumway, he published Stanford's achievements in a report in the British Medical Journal (BMJ) on "Cardiac transplantation in 150 patients at Stanford University". This report was one of the developments that supported the recommencement of heart surgery in the UK under Sir Terence English in 1979.

In December 1980, he participated in the first successful human heart transplant using cyclosporine. The recipient was then age 20 and still living in 2017 at the age of 58.

== Stanford group ==
On 9 March 1981, Jamieson was part of the team that achieved the first long-term survival following a combined heart-lung transplant procedure, led by Bruce Reitz and accompanied by John Wallwork and Norman Shumway. The recipient, a 45-year-old woman with Eisenmenger's syndrome, lived for 5 years. A series of combined heart-lung transplant procedures followed in which alternative blood vessels provided blood to the main airways, reducing bronchial restricted blood supply since the coronary blood vessels remained intact after the bronchial artery had been ligated. Use of cyclosporine reduced acute rejection.

Simultaneous work in Toronto, under Joel D. Cooper and the Toronto transplant group also reported success with single-lung transplants and then with en bloc bilateral lung transplants. Over the next two decades, the state of lung transplantation grew and multiple lung transplant centers became global. Bilateral and single-lung transplants continued to account for most procedures performed. Heart-lung transplants became reserved primarily for those patients with the Eisenmenger anomaly or severe primary pulmonary hypertension. Jamieson was responsible for numerous descriptions of early heart-lung and double lung transplant techniques.

He co-founded the International Society for Heart and Lung Transplantation (ISHLT) in 1981 and later became its president in 1986.

In 1982, Jamieson became the director of heart and lung transplantation at Stanford and retained this position until 1986.

== Minnesota ==
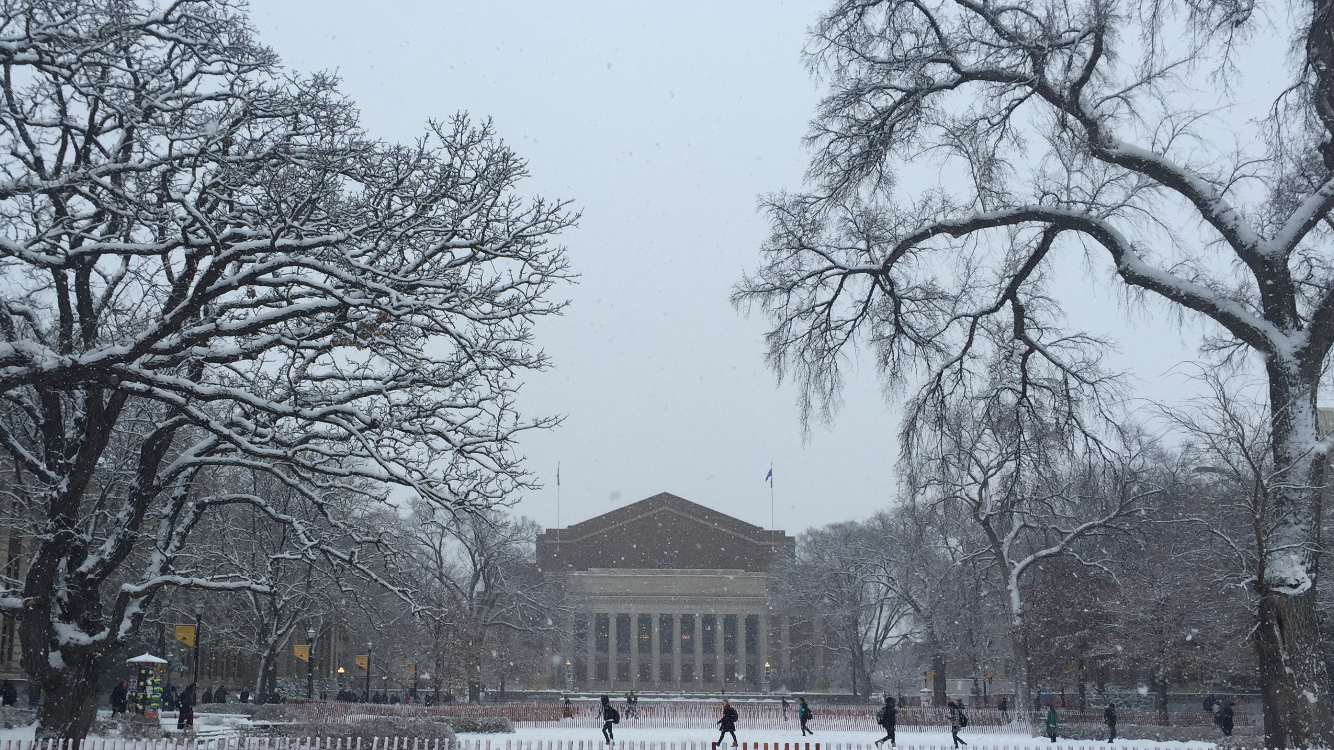
University of Minnesota East Bank campus in the winter

In 1986, Jamieson replaced Walton Lillehei at University of Minnesota as director of the Minnesota Heart and Lung Institute, performing Minnesota's first heart-lung transplant in the same year. In 1988, he performed the Midwest's first double-lung transplant.

== San Diego ==
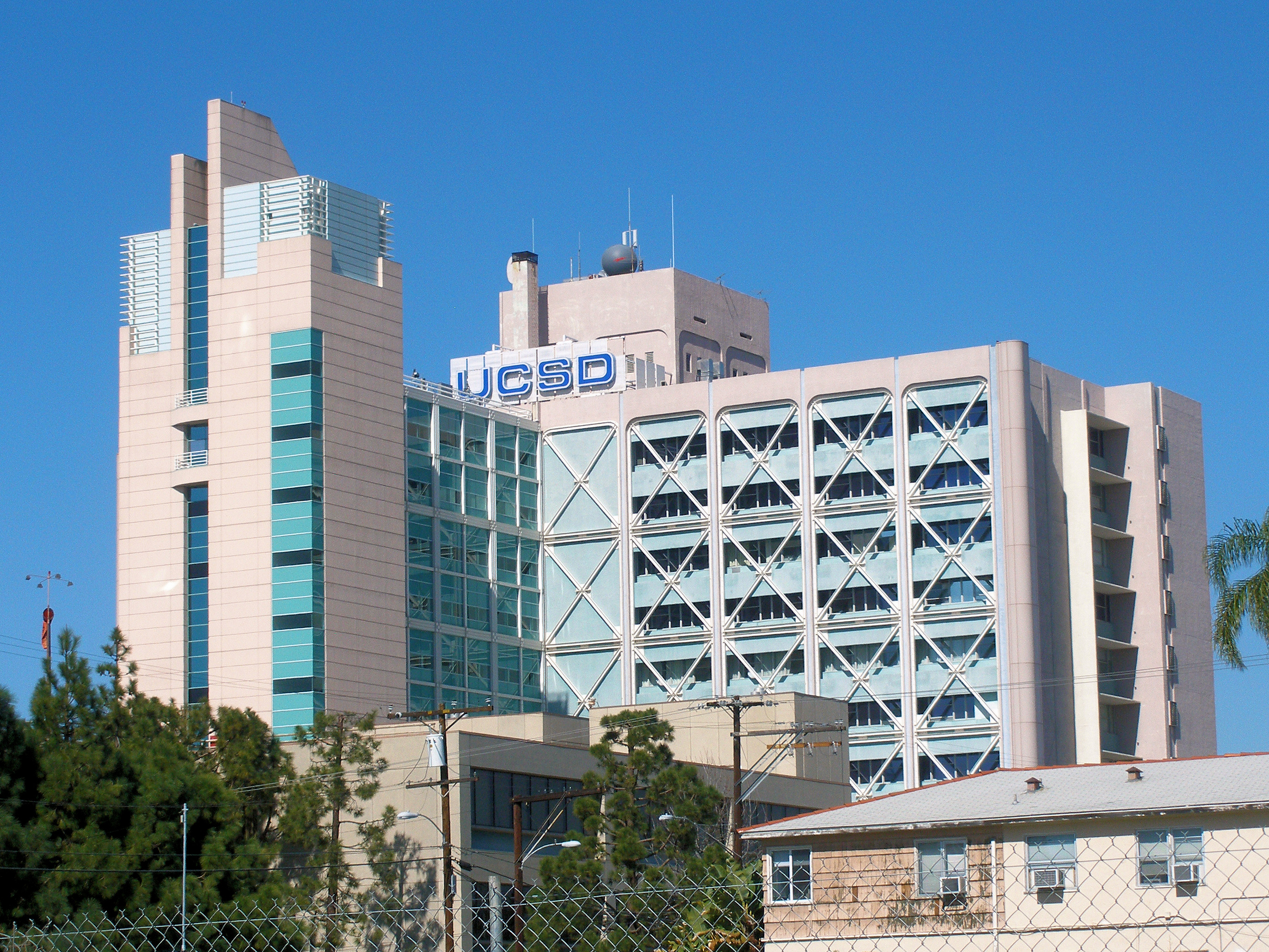
UC San Diego Medical Center in Hillcrest

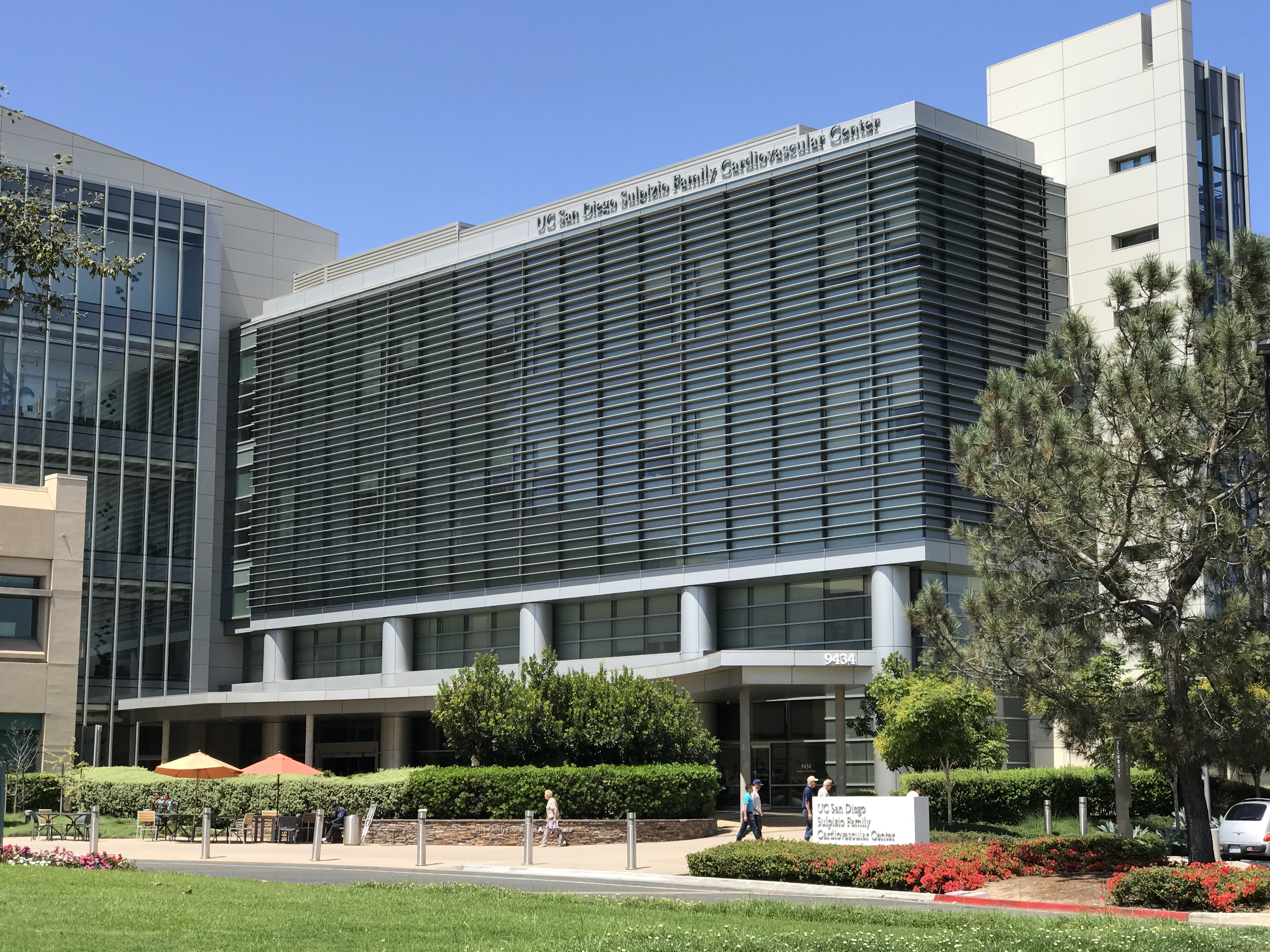
The Sulpizio Family Cardiovascular Center houses the Departments of Cardiology and Emergency Medicine in La Jolla

By 1989, Jamieson had transferred his entire surgical team, including Michael Peter Kaye, to the University of California, San Diego. to which he introduced heart-lung, lung, double lung and living-related transplant, and established the first lung transplantation programme to be Medicare certified and co-founded the Sulpizio Cardiovascular Center

The International Registry for Heart Transplantation, which possesses global heart and heart-lung transplants records, and the editorial offices of the Journal of Heart Transplantation also moved to UCSD Medical Center.

== Heart-lung surgery ==
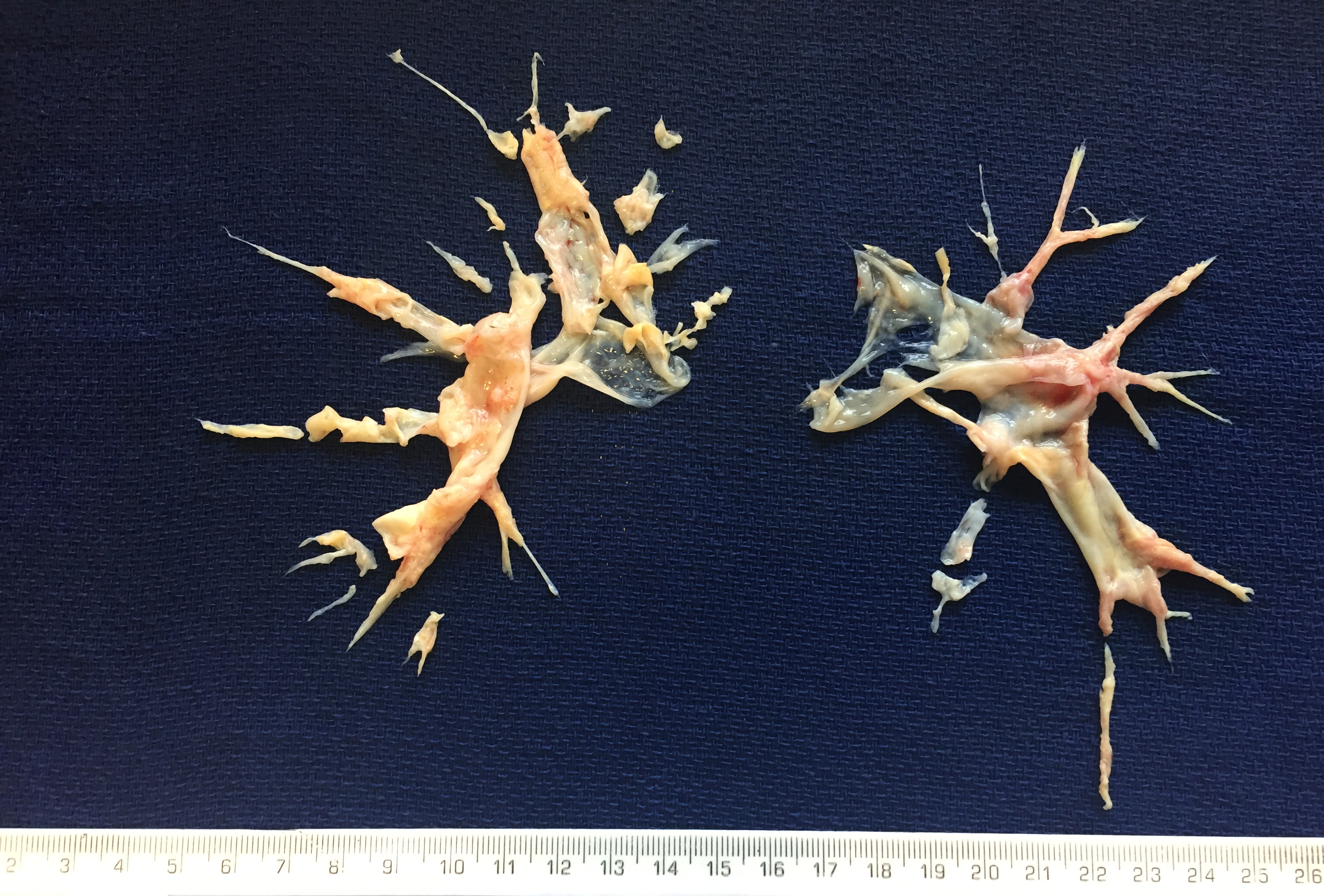
pulmonary endarterectomy

By 1989, he had performed around 500 heart transplants and more than 50 heart-lung transplants. However, due to the shortage of donor supplies, an attempt was made to reduce heart-lung transplants. The heart was increasingly repaired where possible and pulmonary thromboendarterectomy (PTE) performed for Chronic thromboembolic pulmonary hypertension (CTEPH).

PTE is an operation that removes organized clotted blood (thrombus) from the pulmonary arteries of people with chronic thromboembolic pulmonary hypertension (CTEPH). Many physicians have been unaware of the existence of CTEPH and as a consequence it has been underdiagnosed. Jamieson was the first to report that CTEPH can be corrected with PTE.

Jamieson's 2003 publication, describing the first 1,500 cases of PTE, confirmed the benefits of surgery and dismissed the myth that poor right ventricular function disqualified a patient as fit for surgery. He argued that whatever the degree of right ventricular failure, PTA improved patients lives. While medical management may provide some temporary relief of symptoms, PTE is considered curative for CTEPH.

By 2011 there were approximately 30 centers worldwide that offered pulmonary endarterectomy and half of the 4,000 procedures performed were being done by Jamieson's programme directorship at University of California, San Diego (UCSD).

Jamieson pioneered the procedure of pulmonary thromboendarterectomy (PTE). During his four decades at UCSD, he made modifications to the procedure of PTE, adapted surgical instruments and proposed a classification of CTEPH.

== Karen (orangutan) ==
In 1994, Jamieson led the team that performed the first open heart surgery on an orangutan, Karen, at the San Diego Zoo. He repaired her penny-size hole in the heart when she was two years old. She recovered and made headlines.

== Personal life ==
Jamieson is a cattle rancher and commercial helicopter pilot. He has three children.

== Awards ==
- Irvine H. Page Atherosclerosis Research Prize of the American Heart Association (AHA) (1978).
- Ellis Island Medal of Honor (2008).
- ISHLT Pioneer Award (2017).

== Selected publications ==
Jamieson has published more than 500 scientific papers and authored two key medical textbooks on heart and lung surgery.

=== Autobiography ===
- Close to the Sun; The Journey of a Pioneer Heart Surgeon, RosettaBooks (2019), ISBN 978-1-948122-32-0

=== Book chapters ===
- "Modern Management of Chronic Pulmonary Thromboembolism including Pulmonary Thromboendarterectomy" in Advanced Therapy in Thoracic Surgery, 2005. (With Michael M. Madani)

=== Journal articles ===
- "Cardiac transplantation in 150 patients at Stanford University", British Medical Journal, No. 1 (1979), pp. 93–95. (With Edward B. Stinson and Norman Shumway)
- "Primary Pulmonary Hypertension and Pregnancy", Chest Journal, Vol. 89, No. 3 (March 1986), pp. 383–388.
- "Pulmonary endarterectomy: Experience and lessons learned in 1,500 cases" The Annals of Thoracic Surgery, Vol. 76, No. 5 (November 2003), pp. 1457–1464.
- "Pulmonary endarterectomy", US Cardiology, Vol 1, No. 1 (2004), pp. 1–3.
- "Technical advances of pulmonary endarterectomy for chronic thromboembolic pulmonary hypertension", Seminars in Thoracic and Cardiovascular Surgery, Vol. 18, Issue 3 (2006), pp. 243–249. (With M. Madani)
- "Pulmonary endarterectomy: recent changes in a single institution's experience of more than 2,700 patients", The Annals of Thoracic Surgery, Vol. 94, Issue 1 (July 2012), doi:10.1016/j.athoracsur.2012.04.004
