= Reemtsma (disambiguation) =

Reemtsma may refer to:

- Reemtsma, a tobacco company.
- Keith Reemtsma (1925–2000), transplant surgeon.
- Jan Philipp Reemtsma (born 1952), German literary scholar and political activist.
