= Michael L. Hess =

- Born: 10 August 1942; Philipsburg, Pennsylvania, US
- Died: 13 April 2019 (aged 76)
- Education: Saint Francis University; University of Pittsburgh Medical School
- Known for: Co-founding the International Society for Heart and Lung Transplantation (ISHLT); Development of mechanical assist pumps
- Medical career
- Profession: Cardiologist
- Institutions: Virginia Commonwealth University (VCU)
- Sub-specialties: Post heart transplantation medicine
- Awards: 2020 ISHLT lifetime achievement award

Michael L. Hess (10 August 1942 – 13 April 2019) was an American professor of cardiology and physiology at the Medical College of Virginia (MCV) who was instrumental in founding the International Society for Heart and Lung Transplantation (ISHLT), of which he served as its first president.

Early in his career he worked on the physiology of heart muscle, and in taking care of Richard Lower's patients after they had received heart transplants. His research included looking at the effects on a donor heart after reperfusion therapy following a period of low oxygen. In 1980, he had begun to contact people active in the field of heart transplantation for the purpose of gathering information on heart transplants and creating a transplant group. It led to the formation of the ISHLT. After retiring, he returned to the MCV to set up a cardio-oncology program in 2013, before retiring again in 2017.

Hess was posthumously awarded the 2020 ISHLT lifetime achievement award in April 2021. The cardiology library at the MCV, the Dr Michael Hess Library, is named for him.

== Early life and family ==
Michael Lees Hess was born in Philipsburg, Pennsylvania, on 10 August 1942. He completed his undergraduate studies from Saint Francis University in 1964, before starting training to be a wrestling coach, but following an eye injury during a practice wrestle he was advised by the town's only physician to study medicine. He gained admission to the University of Pittsburgh Medical School, and a professor of physiology offered to help with tuition fees in exchange for working in his new cardiac muscle research laboratory, where Hess then spent the subsequent three years. As a student, his work at the lab resulted in his first publication in Nature. He had co-discovered the sarcoplasmic reticulum, part of heart muscle cells. He spent his senior medical school year at St Bartholomew's Hospital in London, where he helped set up a similar cardiac muscle research laboratory, before gaining his MD and completing his residency from Pittsburgh.

He married Andrea Hastillo on 8 December 1968, whom he met at medical school. They had one daughter.

== Career ==
In 1971, Hess moved to Richmond and followed the muscle physiologist professor and joined the physiology faculty at the Medical College of Virginia (MCV). (Note: Medical College of Virginia (MCV) later became known as Virginia Commonwealth University (VCU)) From 1973 to 1975, he served in the US Navy, stationed at Portsmouth, Virginia. Subsequently, he returned to the MCV, where he worked in physiology, and internal medicine and cardiology. Hess's early work at the MCV during the 1970s and 80s included taking care of Richard Lower's patients after they had received heart transplants. His research included looking at the effects on a donor heart after reperfusion therapy following a period of low oxygen, and in 1981, he published the original description of the effects of oxygen-free radicals on donor heart muscle after they were re-supplied with blood.

In 1980, then professor of medicine in cardiology at the MCV, Hess had begun to contact people active in the field of heart transplantation for the purpose of gathering information on heart transplants and creating a transplant group at the upcoming American Heart Association meeting. In addition to a friend from his student days, his first contacts included Michael Kaye, Jack Copeland and John S. Schroeder. They were joined by Jacques Losman from Belgium and Albert Guerraty from Canada. Word spread and others came forward. How instrumental Hess was in founding a registry of heart transplants and a forum for discussing what was then a very rare surgical procedure, was recounted by Sir Terence English in 2017. In 1980, one of Hess's letters was sent to Edward Stinson at Stanford University, a colleague of Stuart Jamieson, who sent it to English. The letter included the names of those Hess was contacting and explained that the aim of the group was to share protocols and gather data relating to heart transplantation. The group was initially named the “International Study Group for Cardiac Transplantation” and its first meeting was held on 17 November 1980, when its focus was to create a scientific register of useful data. It held its first official meeting with around 80 delegates on 14 March 1981 in San Francisco, and it later became known as the International Society for Heart and Lung Transplantation (ISHLT). Hess laid out the original aims of the ISHLT; to provide a forum to discuss heart transplantation, to create registers of meaningful scientific data, to establish an independent journal, to be international with the inclusion of multiple disciplines, and to gain government medical insurance and grants.

From 1982 to 1991 and from 1999 to 2002, he served as director of the Heart Failure Transplant Program. worked with the National Institutes of Health, the Canadian Heart Foundation, and NASA. After retiring, he returned to the MCV to set up a cardio-oncology program in 2013, before retiring again in 2017. That year, with Sharon Hunt, he published "Conquering the First Hurdles in Cardiac Transplantation: In the Footprints of Giants", in which he detailed the challenges faced by the early heart transplant surgeons.

== Awards and honours ==
Hess received several awards for his efforts in teaching junior doctors, and students of physiology and medicine. Three of them were university honors, including VCU's Distinguished Scholarship Award, Distinguished Clinician Award, and University Award of Excellence.

== Death and legacy ==
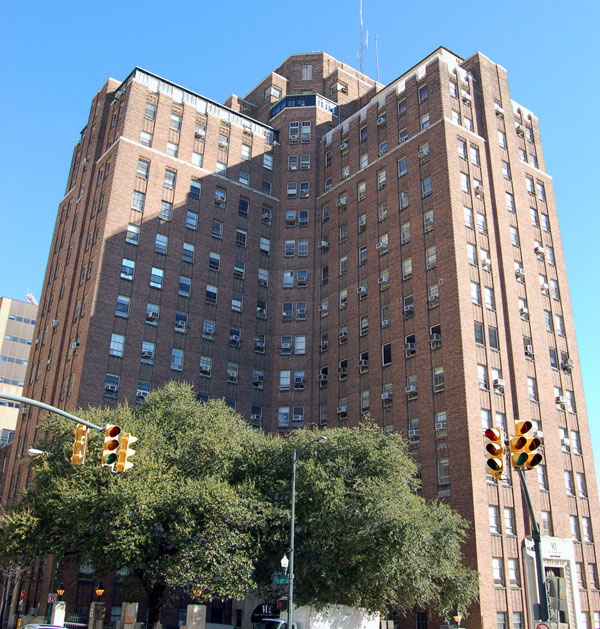
VCU West Hospital

Hess died on 13 April 2019. He was posthumously awarded the 2020 ISHLT lifetime achievement award in April 2021. The cardiology library, which he unveiled himself the previous year, in the West Hospital at the MCV, the Dr Michael Hess Library, is named for him.

== Selected publications ==
He published authored or edited three textbooks and more than two hundred research papers.

=== Books ===
- Heart Disease in Primary Care. Williams & Wilkins. 1999. ISBN 978-0-683-03988-7.

=== Papers ===
- Hess, Michael L.; Briggs, F. Norman; Shinebourne, Elliot; Hamer, John (October 1968). "Effect of Adrenergic Blocking Agents on the Calcium Pump of the Fragmented Cardiac Sarcoplasmic Reticulum". Nature. 220 (5162): 79–80. Bibcode:1968Natur.220...79H. doi:10.1038/220079a0. ISSN 1476-4687. PMID 5677451. S2CID 2591500.
- Hess et al (1981). "Characterization of the excitation—contraction coupling system of the hypothermic myocardium following ischaemia and repercussion". Cardiovascular Res. 15: 380
- Hess, M. L.; Manson, N. H. (November 1984). "Molecular oxygen: friend and foe. The role of the oxygen free radical system in the calcium paradox, the oxygen paradox and ischemia/reperfusion injury". Journal of Molecular and Cellular Cardiology. 16 (11): 969–985. doi:10.1016/s0022-2828(84)80011-5. ISSN 0022-2828. PMID 6394765.
- Ensor, Christopher R.; Cahoon, William D.; Crouch, Michael A.; Katlaps, Gundars J.; Hess, Michael L.; Cooke, Richard H.; Gunnerson, Kyle J.; Kasirajan, Vigneshwar (2010). "Antithrombotic therapy for the CardioWest temporary total artificial heart". Texas Heart Institute Journal. 37 (2): 149–158. ISSN 1526-6702. PMC 2851409. PMID 20401285.
- Shah, Keyur B.; Tang, Daniel G.; Cooke, Richard H.; Harton, Suzanne; Flattery, Maureen; Katlaps, Gundars J.; Kasirajan, Vigneshwar; Hess, Michael L. (9 February 2011). "Implantable Mechanical Circulatory Support: Demystifying Patients With Ventricular Assist Devices and Artificial Hearts". Clinical Cardiology. 34 (3): 147–152. doi:10.1002/clc.20825. ISSN 0160-9289. PMC 6652496. PMID 21308692.
- Hess, Michael L.; Hunt, Sharon (1 December 2017). "Conquering the first hurdles in cardiac transplantation: In the footprints of giants". The Journal of Heart and Lung Transplantation. 36 (12): 1276–1278. doi:10.1016/j.healun.2017.10.007. ISSN 1053-2498. PMID 29173385.
