= 1947–48 BSC Young Boys season =

BSC Young Boys
1947–48 season
- Chairman: Erwin Bähler
- Manager: William Baumgartner
- Stadium: Stadion Wankdorf
- Nationalliga B: 4th
- Swiss Cup: Round of 32
- Biggest win: FC Emmenbrücke 2–8 Young Boys
- Biggest defeat: Nordstern Basel 5–2 Young Boyss

The 1947–48 season was the 48th season in the history of Berner Sport Club Young Boys. The team played their home games at Stadion Wankdorf in Bern. This was their first season in the second division after being relegated from the top flight.

== Players ==
- Weiss
- Flühmann
- Zehnder
- C. Casali
- Stoll
- Bigler
- Giacometti
- H. Grütter
- Rossetti
- Weil
- Zaugg

== Friendlies ==
Win Draw Loss

== Competitions ==
=== Overall record ===
Competition	First match	Last match	Starting round	Final position	Record							
Competition	First match	Last match	Starting round	Final position	Pld	W	D	L	GF	GA	GD	Win %
Nationalliga B	31 August 1947	13 June 1948	Matchday 1	4th	26	10	10	6	55	39	+16	38.46
Swiss Cup	26 October 1947	7 December 1947	3rd principal round	Round of 32	2	1	0	1	9	5	+4	50.00
Total					28	11	10	7	64	44	+20	39.29

Source: Competitions

=== Nationalliga B ===
==== Matches ====
31 August 1947 1	SC Zug	2–2	Young Boys	Lucerne
				Stadium: Stadion Allmend; Attendance: 1,000

7 September 1947 2	Young Boys	3–0	Thun	Bern
				Stadium: Stadion Wankdorf; Attendance: 3,000

14 September 1947 3	FC Concordia Basel	1–5	Young Boys	Basel
				Stadium: Stadion Rankhof; Attendance: 3,000

28 September 1947 4	Young Boys	2–2	CS International Genève	Bern
				Stadium: Stadion Wankdorf; Attendance: 3,500

5 October 1947 5	FC Fribourg	1–1	Young Boys	Fribourg
				Stadium: Stade Universitaire Saint-Léonard; Attendance: 2,600

12 October 1947 6	Young Boys	1–2	Urania Genève Sport	Bern
				Stadium: Stadion Wankdorf; Attendance: 4,000

19 October 1947 7	SC Brühl	2–1	Young Boys	St. Gallen
				Stadium: Sportplatz Krontal; Attendance: 2,500

9 November 1947 8	Young Boys	4–1	St. Gallen	Bern
				Stadium: Stadion Wankdorf; Attendance: 4,500

16 November 1947 9	Nordstern Basel	5–2	Young Boys	Basel
				Stadium: Stadion Rankhof; Attendance: 1,800

23 November 1947 19	Young Boys	1–1	Schaffhausen	Bern
				Stadium: Stadion Wankdorf; Attendance: 3,200

30 November 1947 11	Chiasso	2–1	Young Boys	Chiasso
				Stadium: Campo di via Maestri Comacini; Attendance: 2,000

14 December 1947 12	Young Boys	0–0	Aarau	Bern
				Stadium: Stadion Wankdorf; Attendance: 3,500

11 January 1948 13	Luzern	3–3	Young Boys	Lucerne
				Stadium: Stadion Allmend; Attendance: 3,200

22 February 1948 14	Young Boys	0–0	SC Zug	Bern
				Stadium: Stadion Wankdorf; Attendance: 2,000

29 February 1948 15	Thun	0–0	Young Boys	Thun
				Stadium: Sportplatz Grabengut; Attendance: 3,500

7 March 1948 17	CS International Genève	1–1	Young Boys	Geneva
				Stadium: Stade de Frontenex; Attendance: 3,500

14 March 1948 16	Young Boys	3–1	Concordia Basel	Bern
				Stadium: Stadion Wankdorf; Attendance: 3,500

4 April 1948 18	Young Boys	3–0	FC Fribourg	Bern
				Stadium: Stadion Wankdorf; Attendance: 4,500

18 April 1948 19	Urania Genève Sport	2–0	Young Boys	Geneva
				Stadium: Stade de Frontenex; Attendance: 3,000

25 April 1948 20	Young Boys	3–1	SC Brühl	Bern
				Stadium: Stadion Wankdorf; Attendance: 3,000

2 May 1948 21	St. Gallen	1–1	Young Boys	St. Gallen
				Stadium: Espenmoos; Attendance: 3,000

6 May 1948 22	Young Boys	3–2	Nordstern Basel	Bern
				Stadium: Stadion Wankdorf; Attendance: 3,500

15 May 1948 23	Schaffhausen	3–5	Young Boys	Schaffhausen
				Stadium: Sportplatz Bühl; Attendance: 2,000

30 May 1948 24	Young Boys	4–2	Chiasso	Bern
				Stadium: Stadion Wankdorf; Attendance: 3,500

6 June 1948 25	Aarau	1–4	Young Boys	Aarau
			Weil; Rossetti	Stadium: Stadion Brügglifeld; Attendance: 2,500

13 June 1948 26	Young Boys	2–3	Luzern	Bern
	Rossetti; Stoll			Stadium: Stadion Wankdorf; Attendance: 2,000
