= Andrew De La Pena =

Heart transplant recipient

- Born: 1986 (age 39–40)
- Known for: Receiving a heart (1986)

Andrew De La Pena was five months old when he received a new heart in 1986 at Stanford University School of Medicine, in an operation led by Norman Shumway. Edward Stinson led the donor team and the donor heart was flown to Stanford on a 2-seater fighter plane with the pilot only, that is without the donor team. The story made headlines and was published in the New York Times Magazine and then picked up by Reader's Digest who published an article entitled "A New Heart for Andrew" in 1988. He later survived Hodgkins Lymphoma and Hurricane Katrina and at the age of 32, was reunited with the donor parents.
