= Bruno Reichart =

German cardiothoracic surgeon

Professor Bruno Reichart
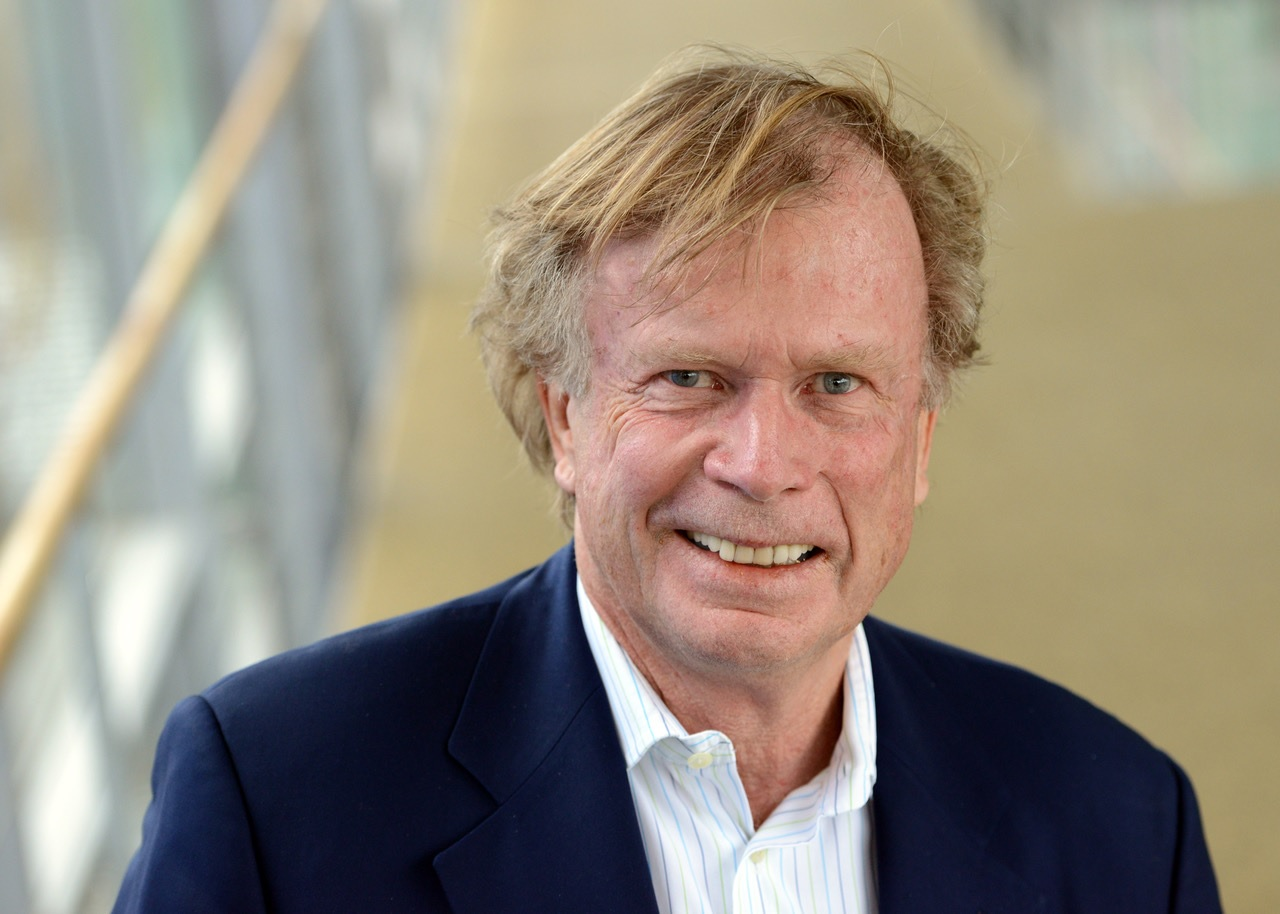
- Born: 18 January 1943 (age 83); Vienna, Reichsgau Wien, Germany (now Austria)
- Education: University of Erlangen–Nuremberg; LMU Munich
- Occupation: Cardiothoracic surgeon
- Known for: Performed Germany's: first heart transplant in 1981; first combined heart–lung transplant in 1983

Bruno Reichart (born 18 January 1943) is a retired German cardiothoracic surgeon who performed Germany's first successful heart transplant in 1981 and its first combined heart–lung transplant in 1983.

In 1984, he succeeded Christiaan Barnard at Groote Schuur Hospital in Cape Town and was appointed president of the International Society for Heart and Lung Transplantation (ISHLT) from 1988 to 1990. He returned to Munich in 1990 as director of the Cardiac Surgery Clinic at the Klinikum Großhadern of LMU Munich.

He has also been active in experimental research in xenotransplantation and from 2011 became a spokesman for funded research into the transplantation of pig tissue and organs into primates, with a team involving veterinarians, virologists, clinicians, lawyers and ethicists.

== Early life and education ==
Bruno Reichart was born in Vienna in 1943 and grew up in Ingolstadt. He studied medicine at the University of Erlangen–Nuremberg and LMU Munich and received his MD in 1968, after which he became a medical assistant at the First Gynecological Clinic of LMU Munich, the Surgical Department of the Municipal Hospital Munich-Harlaching and at the Medical Clinic of LMU Munich.

== Early surgical career ==
From 1971 to 1973, Reichart worked as a surgical assistant under surgeon Rudolf Zenker and within a year was appointed visiting cardiac physician in Memphis, Tennessee, where he focused on heart, lung, and vascular surgery.

Upon his return to Munich in 1974, Reichart commenced surgery at the Cardiac Surgery Clinic at the LMU. In 1977, he became its senior physician and a year later he passed his habilitation with the topic "The mechanical support of acute right heart failure", and became a cardiothoracic surgeon in 1978.

=== Heart transplant 1981 ===
On 19 August 1981, Reichart performed Germany's first successful heart transplant at LMU. The procedure was previously performed more than 10 years earlier in 1969, when two heart transplants took place in the Cardiac Surgery Clinic at LMU, but they were both unsuccessful, with one dying within two days of surgery, from a coronary thrombosis. Reichart's attempt in 1981 involved a 32-year-old recipient who had experienced a heart attack a year earlier and was left with severely impaired left ventricular function. During the year until heart transplant, the recipient also experienced a large blood clot in the lung, acute heart failure and a stomach ulcer. The 23-year-old donor had been killed in a road traffic accident ten days before the transplant. Azathioprine, cortisone and Anti-thymocyte globulin were the immunosuppressants used until two rejection episodes resulted in changing therapy to cyclosporine A three weeks after surgery and they were discharged from hospital at Christmas 1981.

Between 1978 and 1982, he held various professorships including Boston University, the University of Birmingham, the University of Wisconsin–Milwaukee, the University of Paris, and Stanford University.

More than twenty heart transplant procedures followed over the next three years. Under his leadership, intermittently spanning over 40 years at LMU Munich, more than 1,000 heart transplants were performed.

=== Combined heart-lung transplant 1983 ===
On 13 February 1983, Reichart was the first in Germany to perform a combined heart–lung transplant. The recipient was 27 years old and bed-bound with severe pulmonary hypertension and diseased liver and kidneys. The donor, three years younger, had died the previous day from a clot in the brain. Following the combined heart–lung transplant, the recipient died after ten days. Reichart was appointed professor at the LMU in the same year.

== Later surgical career ==
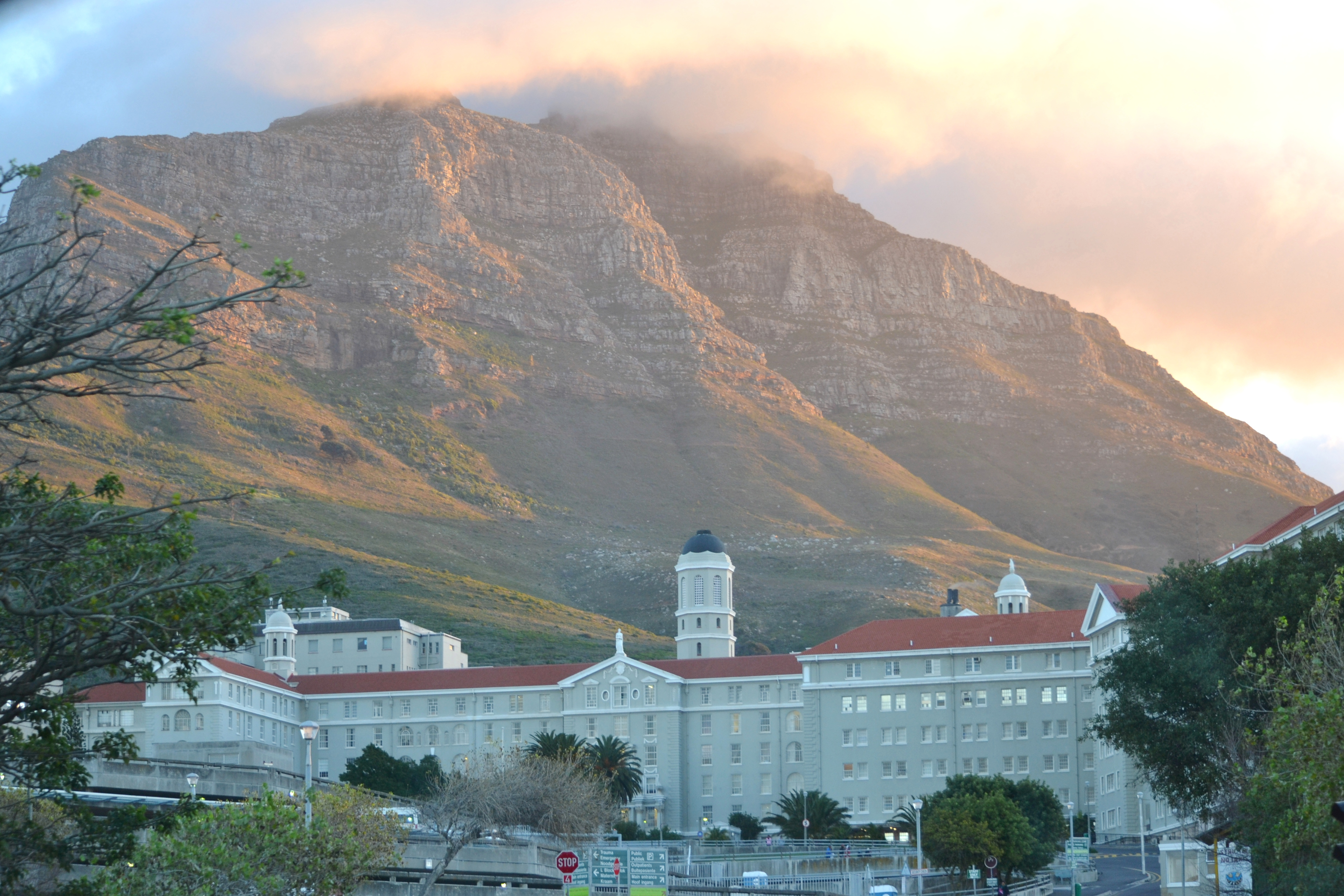
Groote Schuur Hospital

In 1984, he became a cardiac surgeon at the South African Groote Schuur Hospital in Cape Town, succeeding Christiaan Barnard. Here, his research on baboons and green monkeys had been discontinued due to problems with its acceptance from society and the universities.

In 1990, he returned to Munich and was appointed director of the Cardiac Surgery Clinic at the Klinikum Großhadern of LMU Munich.

=== Xenotransplantation ===
In 2011, he became a spokesman for funded research into the transplantation of pig tissue and organs into primates (xenotransplantation,) leading a group that develops transgenic pigs.

To prevent hyperacute rejection and coagulation disorders, harmful pig genes are replaced with certain human genes. This German Research Foundation (DFG) funded research, the “Biology of xenogeneic cell, tissue, and organ transplantation – from basic research to clinical application” has involved collaborating with veterinarians, virologists, clinicians, lawyers and ethicists.

At his 75th birthday celebrations in 2018, he anticipated that it would take at least three years before the first human would be implanted with a pig's heart. He aspires to see that "the transplanted tissues and organs will eventually be genetically programmed to also carry an immunosuppressive molecule on all their cells, so that even fewer corresponding drugs are needed - or perhaps none at all".

== Awards and honours ==
Reichart was president of the ISHLT from 1988 to 1990, who honoured him with the Pioneer Award for his work in heart surgery in Munich at their 35th annual meeting in 2015. He holds emeritus membership of the society.

== Selected publications ==
=== Books ===
- Crossing the Borders in Heart Surgery: Simple Thoughts, University of Cape Town, 1985, ISBN 9780799209723.

=== Articles ===
- Reichart, B; Guethoff, S; Brenner, P; Poettinger, T; Wolf, E; Ludwig, B; Kind, A; Mayr, T; Abicht, JM (2015). "Xenotransplantation of Cells, Tissues, Organs and the German Research Foundation Transregio Collaborative Research Centre 127". Immune Responses to Biosurfaces. Advances in Experimental Medicine and Biology. Vol. 865. pp. 143–55. doi:10.1007/978-3-319-18603-0_9. ISBN 978-3-319-18602-3. PMID 26306448.
- Reichart, B; Schroth, U; Jauch, KW (2017). "Allocation of Organs Should be Based on the Current Status of Medical Science". Transplantation. 101 (8): e283–e284. doi:10.1097/TP.0000000000001800. PMC 5542785. PMID 28437287.
