= Leslie W. Miller =

American cardiologist

Leslie W. Miller is an American cardiologist, the Chief Science Officer at Okyanos Heart Institute and a past president of the International Society of Heart and Lung Transplantation (ISHLT) and the American Society of Transplant Physicians. He has been involved in numerous clinical trials studying the safety and efficacy of treatments for heart failure, heart transplantation and ventricular assist devices and on the use of adult stem cells to repair and recover heart function.
