= International Society for Heart and Lung Transplantation =

Medical organization

- Abbreviation: ISHLT
- Formation: 1981; 45 years ago
- Type: Medical association
- Headquarters: Texas
- President
- Website: www.ISHLT.org

The International Society for Heart and Lung Transplantation (ISHLT), established in 1981, is a professional organization committed to research and education in heart and lung disease and transplantation. It holds annual scientific meetings and publishes The Journal of Heart and Lung Transplantation. It also holds the worlds largest registry of heart and lung transplant data.

== Origin ==
The initial idea for the society came about at a meeting in November 1980 in Miami, Florida, during the annual meeting of the American Heart Association, and was led by Michael L. Hess. The International Society of Heart Transplantation had formed earlier in 1973. Other founding members include Edward Stinson, Andrea Hastillo, Jacques Losman, Mark Thompson, Jack Copeland, Sir Terence English, Stuart Jamieson and Michael Kaye. The first official meeting was held in 1981.

In 1981, cardiac transplantation pioneer Norman Shumway, became the lifetime honorary president and thereafter, the society widened its membership internationally and across specialities including pathology.

== Registry ==
The ISHLT holds a record of over 120,000 heart transplants performed between 1967 and 2020.

== ISHLT Awards ==
=== Philip K. Caves award ===
Since 1982, the ISHLT has awarded one of its highest awards in the name of surgeon Philip Caves, who pioneered the procedure of transvenous endomyocardial biopsy to assess for rejection following heart transplantation.

=== Lifetime achievement awards ===
The ISHLT lifetime achievement award is given to those whose lifetime work has "made a significant contribution toward improving the care of patients with advanced heart or lung disease" In its thirty eight year history, only seven have been awarded.

Norman Shumway received the first award in 1996.

Keith Reemtsma received the ISHLT Lifetime Achievement Award in 1999.

In 2012, Sharon Hunt, who has published more than 200 papers related to particularly organ rejection, post-operative care and bridge-to-transplant, was awarded the ISHLT Lifetime achievement award.

In 2014, the award was bestowed to Sir Terence English for "outstanding achievements and tireless dedication in the field of heart and lung transplantation". He served as a Cardiothoracic Surgeon to Papworth and Addenbrooke Hospital, between 1972 and 1995.

In 2018, the seventh ISHLT lifetime achievement award was presented to O. H. Frazier for his pioneering work in the treatment of severe heart failure, and in the development and innovation of heart transplantation and artificial devices.

Michael Hess received the award in 2021.

=== ISHLT lifetime service award ===
Kaye received this in 1996 and Losman in 1997.

=== ISHLT O.H. Frazier award ===
Since 2014, the ISHLT "O.H. Frazier Award", a grant in Mechanical Circulatory Systems Translational Research has been awarded, initially sponsored by HeartWare and later sponsored by Medtronic.

=== ISHLT pioneer award ===
The first 'pioneer award' was awarded to Vladimir Demikhov on 25 April 1989 in Munich, Germany, by Christian Cabrol. Twenty years later, in 2009, Cabrol received the 'pioneer award'.

=== ISHLT distinguished educator award ===
In 2014, the first distinguished educator award was awarded to James Kirklin.

== Past presidents ==
=== 1981–1990 ===
Year	Image	Nationality	Name	Notes
1981–1982		United States	Michael L. Hess	First president, credited with starting the ISHLT at the annual meeting of the American Medical Association in 1981.
1982–1983		United States	Jack Copeland	Co-founder of ISHLT, in 1985 he was the first to successfully bridge a patient dying from end-stage heart failure to a donor heart transplant with a total artificial heart.
1984–1986		United Kingdom	Sir Terence English	Performed Britain's first successful heart transplant in August 1979 and received the ISHLT Lifetime Achievement Award in 2014.
1986–1988		United States	Stuart Jamieson	Pioneer of pulmonary thromboendarterectomy, received the 2017 ISHLT Pioneer Award.
1988–1990		Germany	Bruno Reichart	Performed the first cardiopulmonary transplantation in Germany in 1983.

=== 1990–2001 ===
1990–1991	Margaret Billingham	First female president, who, with ISHLT sponsorship in 1990, published the first internationally agreed classification for the pathalogical diagnosis of cardiac rejection.
1991–1992	Christian Cabrol	Trained at one time, alongside Norman Shumway and Christiaan Barnard under C. Walton Lillehei in Minneapolis, and subsequently performed Europe’s first heart transplantation on 27 April 1968.
1992-1993	John B. O'Connell	Cardiologist and Vice President Medical Affairs at Thoratec Corporation.
1993–1994	Eric Rose	In 1984, he performed the world’s first successful paediatric heart transplant.
1994–1995	John Wallwork	Wallwork performed the world's first heart-lung and liver transplant with Sir Roy Calne in 1986.
1995–1996	Sharon Hunt	Pioneered work on post-operative care of heart transplant patients.
1996–1997	William Baumgartner	Professor of surgery at The Johns Hopkins University School of Medicine and Executive Director of the American Board of Thoracic Surgery. Notable for particularly the area of neurological protection in cardiac surgery.
1997–1998	Leslie Miller	Miller has experience in numerous clinical trials studying the safety and efficacy of treatments for heart failure, heart transplantation and ventricular assist devices and on the use of adult stem cells to repair and recover heart function.
1997–1998	Alan Menkis	Renowned for work on treatment of valvular heart disease, mechanical circulatory assist devices and robotic surgery.
1999–2000	Robert L. Kormos	Internationally recognised for cardiac transplantation and his work in the use of mechanical assist devices as temporary or permanent support for people with severe end-stage heart failure.

=== 2000–2011 ===
Years	Name	Comments
2000–2001	Anne Keogh	
2001–2002	James B. Young	
2002–2003	Stephan Schueler	
2003–2004	Jon Kobashigawa	
2005–2006	Mark L. Barr	
2006–2007	Robert C. Robbins	Interests include acquired heart diseases and in the surgical treatment of congestive heart failure and heart-lung transplantation.
2007–2008	Paul A. Corris	
2008–2009	Mandeep R. Mehra	Particular interests include coronary artery disease after transplants (cardiac allograft vasculopathy).
2009–2010	James K. Kirklin	Known for research and work in heart transplantation, LVADs, repairs of congenital heart defects and was the first recipient of the ISHLT Distinguished Educator Award.

=== 2010 onwards ===
Years	Name	Comments
2010–2011	John Dark	Known for research in reperfusion injury and lung rejection.
2011–2012	Lori J. West	
2012–2013	David O. Taylor	
2013–2014	Allan R. Glanville	
2014–2015	Hermann Reichenspurner	
2015–2016	Duane Davis	
2016–2017	Maryl Johnson	
2017–2018	Andrew Fisher	
2018–2019	Jeffrey Teuteberg	
2019–2020	Stuart Sweet	
2020–2021	Joseph Rogers	
2021-2022	Lara Danziger-Isakov	
2022-2023	Andreas Zuckermann	
2023-2024	Jason Christie	
2024-2025	Christian Benden	
2025-2026	Josef Stehlik	
2026-		
