= Keith Reemtsma =

American surgeon

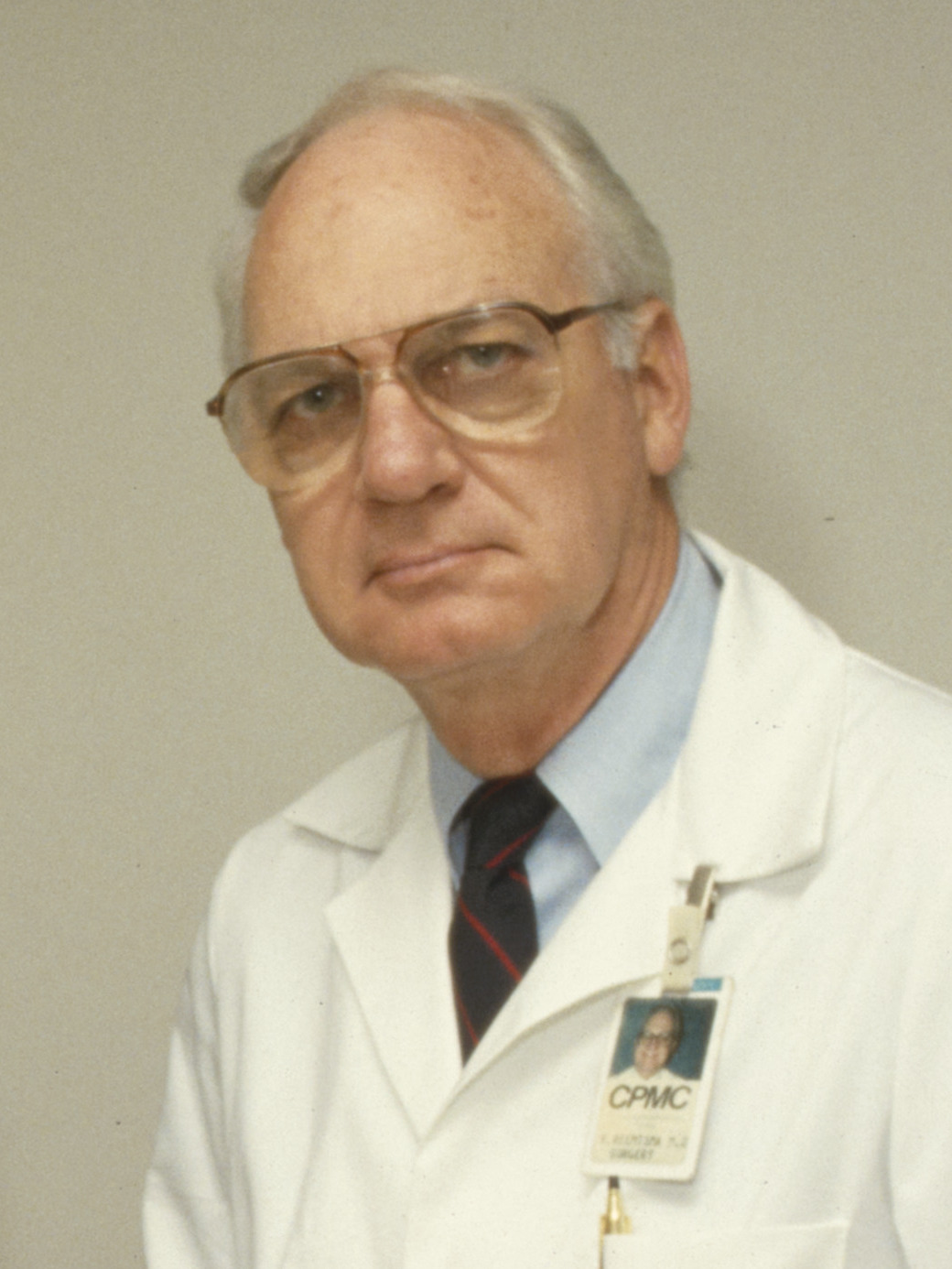
- Reemtsma in 1984
- Born: 5 December 1925; Madera, California
- Died: 23 June 2000 (aged 74); New York City, New York
- Education: Idaho State College; University of Pennsylvania School of Medicine
- Occupation: Surgeon
- Known for: Cross-species kidney transplantation from chimpanzee to human (1964)
- Medical career
- Institutions: Tulane University
- Sub-specialties: Xenotransplantation

Keith Reemtsma (5 December 1925 – 23 June 2000) was an American transplant surgeon, best known for the cross-species kidney transplantation operation from chimpanzee to human in 1964. With only the early immunosuppressants and no long-term dialysis, the female recipient survived nine months, long enough to return to work.

Reemtsma was brought up on a Navajo reservation in Arizona, eventually moving to Utah and then graduating from Idaho State College in Pocatello in 1945. In the 1960s he was professor of surgery at Tulane University, Louisiana, and he later became chairman of the Department of Surgery at the University of Utah.

Reemtsma also developed the intra-aortic balloon pump to bridge the time to heart transplant, and performed early research on pancreatic islet cell transplantation for diabetes mellitus. In 1971, he was appointed chairman of the Department of Surgery at NewYork–Presbyterian Hospital and Columbia University College of Physicians and Surgeons, where he was involved in developing a multidisciplinary approach to transplant services, as well as advocating surgical repair and reconstruction as an alternative to radical excision.

== Early life and education ==
Keith Reemtsma was born in Madera, California, on 5 December 1925, to the Presbyterian minister and missionary Henry and Pauline Reemtsma. He had one older sister, and from 1938 was raised on a Navajo reservation in Arizona when he attended a one-room school house which taught only to eighth grade.

As he progressed in his education, Reemtsma moved from schools in Oklahoma to a Presbyterian boarding school in Mount Pleasant, Utah, where he met his first wife to be, Ann Pierce. He attended Idaho State College as part of the United States Navy V-12 programme, where the federal government funded studies to participating colleges. Here, wearing Navy uniform was mandatory and he would have had to participate in strenuous exercise. He completed his pre-medical studies and graduated in 1945.

Reemtsma subsequently attended the University of Pennsylvania School of Medicine, graduating in 1949, and was inducted into the Phi Chi medical fraternity.

== Early surgical training ==
Reemtsma trained under paediatric surgeon C. Everett Koop who encouraged him to go to Columbia-Presbyterian Medical Center (CPMC) (now called NewYork–Presbyterian / Columbia University Medical Center or, simply NYP/Columbia) for his surgical residency, under paediatric thoracic surgeon, George Humphreys.

Following his internship, his early surgical career was interrupted by the Korean War, where he served as a Navy doctor with the United States Marine Corps as part of US Navy Surgical Team, Far East Command.

Returning to New York in 1954, he then completed his residency at CPMC in 1957, following which he moved south to Tulane University. Here, Reemtsma was recruited to help build a cardiac surgery service. However, he turned his attention toward renal transplantation and cross-species chimpanzee-to-human kidney transplants instead.

== Surgical career ==
=== Xenotransplantation ===
Prior to the 1960s, long-term kidney dialysis was not available, human donors were scarce and immunosuppressants were basic. Unlike centers in Denver and Cleveland, dialysis support came to Reemtsma's center much later, and cyclosporine was not available for use in people until the late 1970s. In addition, an increasing understanding of the immunological basis of organ rejection, the "clinical urgency" of the time, and the ethical and legal hurdles in obtaining donor organs, whether cadaveric or live, led to a desperation. This, combined with Reemtsma's belief in that the lack of previous successful attempts should not deter innovation, led him to explore the possibility of primate-to-human transplantation. The availability of primates from the nearby primate center and an active programme in transplantation immunology, added to his plans.

Between 5 November 1963 and 10 February 1964, whilst professor of surgery at Tulane University, Louisiana, Reemtsma performed a series of chimpanzee-to-human kidney transplants. He posited that nonhuman primate kidneys might function in human recipients and therefore be a successful treatment for renal failure, the alternative being death. Chimpanzee kidneys appealed because of their size and shared blood groups (A and O blood groups) with humans.

Retired from space-flight or the circus, bad-tempered or no longer wanted, both kidneys from six chimpanzees were transplanted into six people who had terminal renal failure, using the 'en bloc' technique, where the two kidneys with their accompanying blood vessels (including aorta and vena cava) were implanted and joined to the recipient's external iliac artery and external iliac vein. Anti-rejection medication after the operation included actinomycin C, corticosteroids and x-ray irradiation. Most survived between just over one week to two months, failure being due to organ rejection or post-operative infection (usually due to the immunosuppressants).

One female school teacher, admitted with chronic glomerulonephritis and severe uraemia in November 1963 at the age of 23, had the chimpanzee kidney transplant procedure performed on 13 January 1964. She remained on immunosuppressants azathioprine and prednisolone, and lived to return to work and survive nine months. Her death from cardiac arrest was found to be due to an imbalance of electrolytes, possibly due to the excessive urination observed following chimpanzee kidney transplantation (frequently greater than 20 liters per day), as the chimpanzee kidneys probably did not work in precisely the same way as human kidneys. At autopsy, it was surprising that her transplanted kidneys did not show any signs of rejection and appeared normal.

Later, the notion of using nonhuman primates as kidney donors was expanded by a number of surgeons, particularly by Tom Starzl. In 1963, James Hardy, who had carried out the first human lung allotransplant, visited Reemtsma and was impressed by the outcome of the chimpanzee kidney transplantations. Hardy went on to transplant a chimpanzee heart into a human; however, the patient survived only a few hours.

In 1964, at the American Surgical Association meeting in Hot Springs, Virginia, where he presented Tulane's experience of early xenotransplants, including the one patient surviving nine months, he was met with mixed emotions. However, his work gained him a promotion to full professor in 1966. He remained skeptical of the persistent opposition to innovation.

=== First artificial heart ===
Between 1966 and 1971, Reemtsma assembled the team that eventually developed the first artificial heart. He was chairman of the Department of Surgery at the University of Utah at the time, a position appointed to him in 1966. He recruited Willem Kolff, the surgeon who, as a young doctor in the Nazi-occupied Netherlands during the Second World War, invented the first dialysis machine using sausage casings and an automobile water pump part. Both were key players in the assembling of the ideal team of surgeons and engineers that eventually implanted the first artificial heart.

=== New York-Presbyterian Hospital transplant services ===
Reemtsma then moved again to become chairman of the Department of Surgery at NewYork–Presbyterian Hospital and the Columbia University College of Physicians and Surgeons from 1971 to 1994. He had an overarching vision that surgery should be transformed from a predominantly destructive discipline of incision, excision, and amputation to a creative discipline of reconstruction, repair, replacement, and renewal.

In 1971, whilst at Columbia-Presbyterian Medical Center (the hospital was renamed in 1998), Reemtsma recruited surgeon Mark A. Hardy, who in turn established the programme for dialysis and kidney transplantation and started the shared clinical care between renal transplant surgeons and renal physicians, at a time when the two faculties were considered separate. Reemtsma and surgical colleague Eric Rose further developed the New York-Presbyterian Hospital transplant services on the principles of a multidisciplinary cooperation between surgeons, nephrologists, immunologists and others. Subsequently, the center established research in immunosuppressant therapy and minimally invasive surgical procedures.

In addition, Reemtsma was the first to demonstrate that a mechanical circulatory assist device, the intra-aortic balloon pump, could function as a mechanical bridge to heart transplantation. At a time when heart transplants were controversial and were only being performed by Norman Shumway at Stanford University, and Richard Lower in Virginia, Reemtsma was committed and succeeded in strengthening Columbia's cardiac residency training programme.

=== Pancreatic islet transplantation ===
Reemtsma spent many years investigating the possibility of non-human islet cell transplantation for diabetes mellitus and in turn influenced Eric Rose who in turn influenced Mark Hardy, the result being a pancreatic islet transplantation programme.

== Personal and family ==
Reemtsma met his first wife Ann Pierce at school and they later married while in medical school. They had two sons. Following a divorce he married Judy Towers, a New York-based medical TV producer, in 1972 and they remained married until his death.

His interests outside of surgery included writing a play involving the artist Jan Vermeer and the scientist Antonie van Leeuwenhoek.

Reemtsma frequently reiterated the story about how owing to his service in Korea, and his behavior and build, he was the model for "Hawkeye Pierce" in Richard Hooker's novel MASH.

== Honours and awards ==
Reemtsma was president of the Society of Clinical Surgery in 1976, president of the American Association for Thoracic Surgery (AATS) from 1990 to 1991, and the first vice president of the American Surgical Association in 1992.

He received the International Society for Heart and Lung Transplantation (ISHLT) Lifetime Achievement Award in 1999.

== Death and legacy ==
Reemtsma died from liver cancer on 23 June 2000 at his home in Manhattan. He was 74.

A student society exists in his name at Columbia University and the Keith Reemtsma Surgical Resident of the Year Award is given by Penn Medicine.

== Selected publications ==
=== Articles ===
- Reemtsma, K; Mccracken, BH; Schlegel, JU; Pearl, MA; Pearce, CW; Dewitt, CW; Smith, PE; Hewitt, RL; Flinner, RL; Creech, O Jr (1964). "Renal Heterotransplmtation in Man". Ann Surg. 160 (3): 384–410. doi:10.1097/00000658-196409000-00006. PMC 1408776. PMID 14206847.
- Reemtsma, K; Giraldo, N; Depp, DA; Eichwald, EJ (1968). "Islet cell transplantation". Ann Surg. 168 (3): 436–46. doi:10.1097/00000658-196809000-00011. PMC 1387348. PMID 4877590.
- Reemtsma, K.; Weber, C. J.; Pi-Sunyer, F. X.; Lerner, R. L.; Hardy, M. A. (1980). "Alternatives in Pancreatic Islet Transplantation: Tissue Culture Studies". Diabetes. 29: 45–51. doi:10.2337/diab.29.1.S45. PMID 6766414. S2CID 29976430.
- Reemtsma, K; Gelijns, AC; Sisk, JE; Arons, RR; Boozang, PM; Berland, GK; Evans, CM; Smith, CR (1993). "Supporting future surgical innovation. Lung transplantation as a case study". Ann Surg. 218 (4): 465–73, discussion 474–5. doi:10.1097/00000658-199310000-00007. PMC 1243001. PMID 8215638.
- Reemtsma, K. (1995). "Xenotransplantation: A Historical Perspective". ILAR Journal. 37 (1): 9–12. doi:10.1093/ilar.37.1.9. PMID 11528018.
- Reemtsma, Keith (2000). "Address by the Honorary Founding President of the Xenotransplantation SocietyThe Eye of an Eagle: xenobiology and the quest for bioadvantage". Xenotransplantation. 7 (2): 80–82. doi:10.1034/j.1399-3089.2000.00045.x. PMID 10961290. S2CID 44604458.

=== Book chapters ===
- "Xenotransplantation — A Brief History of Clinical Experiences: 1900–1965", in D.K.C. Cooper, Ejvind Kemp, Keith Reemtsma, D.J.G. White (Eds.) (1991) Xenotransplantation: The Transplantation of Organs and Tissues Between Species. Springer. pp. 9–22. doi:10.1007/978-3-642-97323-9, ISBN 978-3-642-97325-3
