= Eric Rose =

American cardiothoracic surgeon

Eric A. Rose
- Education: Columbia University (BA, MD)
- Occupation: Cardiothoracic surgeon
- Known for: Performing first successful paediatric heart transplant 1984; Leading REMATCH Trial
- Medical career
- Institutions: Mount Sinai Heart
- Sub-specialties: Cardiothoracic surgery
- Research: Medical devices
- Awards: Bakken Scientific Achievement Award

Eric A. Rose is an American cardiothoracic surgeon, scientist, entrepreneur and professor and Chairman of the Department of Population Health Science & Policy, and Associate Director for Clinical Outcomes at Mount Sinai Heart. He is best known for performing the first successful paediatric heart transplant, in 1984 while at NewYork–Presbyterian Hospital (NYP).

Later, he led the REMATCH Trial, published 2001, which compared the permanent implantation of a Left Ventricular Assist Device (LVAD) with conventional medical treatment in people with severe heart failure who were not eligible for heart transplantation.

Rose has co-founded several biotechnology companies and has been involved in developing anti-virals to smallpox, new medical technologies and new approaches to Alzheimer's disease and bioterrorism.

He was president of the International Society for Heart and Lung Transplantation for 1993–94.

== Early life and family ==
Rose attended the Bronx High School of Science and was class of 1968. At school, he was part of a rockband called Metropolitan Blues Express, an experience he has described as "diverse" and useful as an exercise in "team-building".

He married anaesthesiologist, Ellise Delphin, and they have four children who all live in Manhattan.

== Early medical career ==
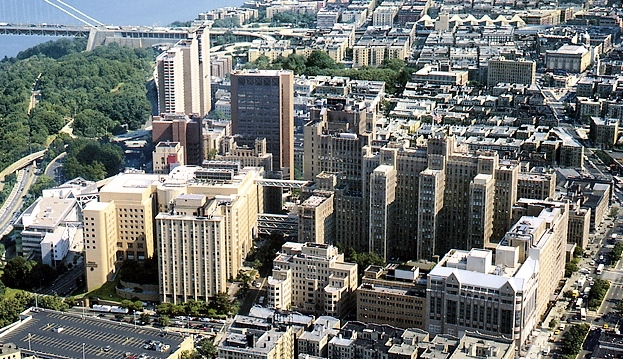
NewYork–Presbyterian Hospital/Columbia campus

Rose completed both his undergraduate, major in psychology at Columbia University, and his medical degree at Columbia University College of Physicians and Surgeons . After graduation he did his residencies in surgery and thoracic surgery at what was then the Presbyterian Hospital.

He spent more than 25 years at Columbia-Presbyterian Medical Center, now NewYork–Presbyterian Hospital / Columbia University Medical Center. During his career at NYP, he held numerous positions including director of the Clinical Perfusion Service and of the Surgical Cardiac Intensive Care Unit, chief of the Cardiothoracic Surgical Service, the Morris and Rose Milstein Professor of Surgery, and associate dean for translational research.

He was president of the International Society for Heart and Lung Transplantation (ISHLT) for 1993–94.

== Heart transplantations ==
=== Paediatric heart transplantation, 1984 ===
Keith Reemtsma had started an adult transplantation programme in 1977 at NewYork–Presbyterian / Columbia and recruited Rose and others to initiate paediatric transplantations. The then-new immunosuppressant Cyclosporin was approved by the FDA in 1983 and contributed to the first successful heart transplant in a child in June 1984.

James Lovette, from Denver, was born with a single ventricle, a condition that was fatal in 1984. The longest survival in a child heart transplant procedure was eighteen days until Rose and his team performed four year old James’s heart transplant on 9 June 1984. The donor heart came from Dorothy Ford's son, John Ford, who was also a four-year-old boy who died after falling from a New York apartment trying to escape a fire. Magnifying glasses helped Rose visualise James's small heart during the surgery and afterwards, rejection was prevented by tailoring the dose of cyclosporine. At the age of 10 years, he required a second heart transplant.

James survived twenty one years after the first transplant, during which at one time he also suffered from Hodgkin lymphoma. His parents were able to witness his graduation and the start of a medical career. However, during his first week of medical school, he died in his sleep.

=== Frank Torre, 1996 ===
On 25 October 1996, Rose led the heart transplant procedure on Yankees manager Joe Torre's brother, 64-year-old baseball player Frank Torre. The previous day, a 28-year-old man from The Bronx had died of severe brain injury at Montefiore Medical Center and his family had consented to donate his kidneys, liver, pancreas and heart. Computer software used by the New York Regional Transplant Programme matched blood, tissue type and dimensions of the heart of this donor with that of John's. Already having had three heart attacks and suffering from severe (class IV) congestive heart failure, John had a very poor quality of life and was severely limited in mobility.

On the morning of the operation, Rose, with Mehmet Oz, MD who was his deputy in the NYP/Columbia Department of Cardiothoracic surgery at the time, took four hours to complete the procedure and by midday the surrounding publicity was immense. The operation was successful and over the coming days, Frank managed to watch his brother’s baseball team beat the Atlanta Braves to win the Series.

== REMATCH (Randomized Evaluation of Mechanical Assistance for the Treatment of Congestive Heart Failure) Trial ==
=== Background ===
During the 1990s, LVADs were used successfully as a bridge-to-transplantation device, that is, to fill the time before a suitable donor could be found, and medical treatment options were limited. Despite the uncertainties, the clinical potential of LVADs for transplant-ineligible heart failure patients encouraged Rose and others to expand the use of these devices beyond their short-term use. Its safety and life expectancy were unknown, and it was unclear as to whether they would provide better outcomes than conventional treatment with medication in people with severe heart failure. Cost-effectiveness was also a factor.

=== PREMATCH ===
The first phase, April 1996 to April 1998, was called PREMATCH and it demonstrated enough data to move to the next larger scale trial. It revealed that the severely ill, older, not fit for heart transplant person could withstand the implant procedure, the implant used being the HeartMate LVAD. However, it was still uncertain as to whether those with an LVAD performed clinically better. Thoratec Corporation demonstrated sufficient safety, efficacy and reliability data to secure premarket approval. With further modifications to the trial methods, the REMATCH protocol was finalized for the second phase multicenter RCT.

=== Second phase ===
Led by Rose when he was chair of Columbia University and surgeon-in-chief at Columbia Presbyterian Medical Center, the REMATCH randomized clinical trial was conducted from May 1998 to July 2001 in collaboration between Columbia University, the National Institutes of Health (NIH) and the Thoratec Corporation. It compared the permanent implantation of a left ventricular assist device (LVAD) with conventional medical treatment in people with heart failure who were not eligible for heart transplantation.

The LVADs were donated by the Thoratec Corporation and the NIH provided finances for the administration and the collection and analysis of data. The CMS and participating hospitals paid for treatment and hospitalization costs. The potential financial exploitation of vulnerable people with life-threatening disease was omitted by not having any charges for study costs and the whole trial was supervised by a steering committee and conveyed by an operations committee with an independent coordinating centre. All 129 people in the trial were not eligible for transplant surgery. They were typically older, with severe left ventricular dysfunction and other medical problems including pulmonary hypertension, peripheral vascular disease and renal disease. 68 people received a LVAD, Thoratec’s HeartMate XVE LVAD, and 61 received drug treatment.

The results surprised many medical professionals. LVAD patients lived significantly longer than those on medical treatment.

== Later career and other roles ==
Rose co-founded several biotechnology companies including Nephros, which is concerned with heart and kidney related medical devices, and between 1997 and 2009, has served at various points, as its chairman, president, chief executive and director. Between 2007 and 2016, he was chief executive of the anti-viral developer SIGA Technologies, having been an executive director at SIGA since 2001 and a member of the National Biodefense Science Board since 2007. He was appointed executive vice president for life sciences at MacAndrews & Forbes in 2007, a position he held until 2016.

Rose joined Mount Sinai in 2008 as the Edmond A. Guggenheim, Professor and Chairman of the Department of Population Health Science & Policy, and Associate Director for Clinical Outcomes at Mount Sinai Heart, taking his 40-member team with him.

He has particularly worked on anti-virals to smallpox and developing medical technologies and new approaches to Alzheimer's disease and bioterrorism.

He has three patents to his name, has brought more than $50 million in on-going federally financed research, and has been recognized as a "grant magnet" by Mount Sinai.

== Awards ==
- During their 53rd annual meeting, in 2017, the Society of Thoracic Surgeons awarded Rose the Bakken Scientific Achievement Award. Granted by Medtronic, the award is named after its co-founder and pacemaker pioneer Earl Bakken, to someone who has solved major cardiothoracic surgery queries.
- He joined the Bronx High School of Science Hall of Fame in 2018.

== Selected publications ==
Rose has authored and co-authored more than 300 peer-reviewed articles on subjects including cardiovascular surgery, ventricular assist devices, and cardiac transplantation. He also wrote two books: Management of End-Stage Heart Disease and Second Opinion: The Columbia Presbyterian Guide to Surgery. His work has been cited in over 3,000 other articles.

=== Books ===
- Management of End-stage Heart Disease. Lippincott-Raven, 1998. (With Lynne Warner Stevenson) ISBN 9780316756976
- Second Opinion: The Columbia-Presbyterian Guide to Surgery. St. Martin's Press, 2015. ISBN 9781466890909

=== Articles ===
- Rose, EA; Moskowitz, AJ; Packer, M; et al. (1999). "The REMATCH Trial: Rationale, Design, and End Points". Annals of Thoracic Surgery. 67 (3): 723–730. doi:10.1016/s0003-4975(99)00042-9. PMID 10215217.
- Rose, EA; Gelijns, AC; Moskowitz, AJ; et al. (November 2001). "Long-term use of a left ventricular assist device for end-stage heart failure". N. Engl. J. Med. 345 (20): 1435–43. doi:10.1056/NEJMoa012175. PMID 11794191.
- Rose, Eric A (2002). "Modernizing surgical education". Current Surgery. 59 (3): 239–240. doi:10.1016/S0149-7944(02)00628-1. PMID 16093140.
- Rose, EA (2003). "Off-pump coronary-artery bypass surgery". N Engl J Med. 348 (5): 379–80. doi:10.1056/NEJMp020171. PMID 12556540.
- Rose, EA (2008). "A new continuous-flow LV assist device for patients with end-stage heart failure". Nat Clin Pract Cardiovasc Med. 5 (2): 80–1. doi:10.1038/ncpcardio1090. PMID 18087297. S2CID 27166670.
- Rose, EA (2014). "Bud Frazier has pioneered mechanical circulatory support". Tex Heart Inst J. 41 (2): 109. doi:10.14503/THIJ-14-4123. PMC 4004499. PMID 24808764.
- Rose, Eric A. (2015). "Understanding translational research: A play in four acts". Journal of Pediatric Surgery. 50 (1): 37–43. doi:10.1016/j.jpedsurg.2014.10.023. PMID 25598090.
- Grosenbach, DW; Honeychurch, K; Rose, EA; Chinsangaram, J; Frimm, A; Maiti, B; Lovejoy, C; Meara, I; Long, P; Hruby, DE (2018). "Oral Tecovirimat for the Treatment of Smallpox". N Engl J Med. 379 (1): 44–53. doi:10.1056/NEJMoa1705688. PMC 6086581. PMID 29972742.
