= Jacques G. Losman =

French transplant surgeon

Jacques G. Losman is a Belgian transplant surgeon who helped to develop the heterotopic heart transplant model. In 1997, he received the lifetime service award of the International Society for Heart and Lung Transplantation.
