= William Baumgartner =

American transplant surgeons

William Baumgartner is professor of surgery at the Johns Hopkins University School of Medicine and was executive director of the American Board of Thoracic Surgery. He is known for his work in neurological protection during cardiac surgery. He was president of the International Society for Heart and Lung Transplantation for 1996–1997.
