= John Wallwork (surgeon) =

British cardiac surgeon

Professor John Wallwork CBE
- Born: July 1946 (age 80)

John Wallwork CBE FRCS FMedSci (born July 1946), is a retired cardiothoracic surgeon and emeritus professor who performed Europe's first successful combined heart-lung transplant in 1984, and in 1986 performed the world's first heart-lung and liver transplant with Sir Roy Calne.

== Early life and education ==
John Wallwork attended Accrington Grammar School.

== Career ==
In 2014, Wallwork became Chairman of Royal Papworth Hospital. He was President of the International Society for Heart and Lung Transplantation (ISHLT) 1994–1995.

Wallwork was elected a Fellow of the Academy of Medical Sciences in 2002.
