= Edward Stinson (surgeon) =

American cardiothoracic surgeon

Edward B. Stinson
- Born: 1938 (age 87–88); San Diego, California, U.S.
- Education: Stanford University
- Known for: Assisting in America's first adult human-to-human heart transplantation, 1968.; Founding member of ISHLT 1981.
- Medical career
- Profession: Cardiothoracic surgeon
- Field: Heart transplant

Edward B. Stinson (born 1938) is an American retired cardiothoracic surgeon living in Los Altos, United States, who assisted Norman Shumway in America's first adult human-to-human heart transplantation on 6 January 1968 at Stanford University.

For over twenty years, Stinson was the principal investigator for the National Institutes of Health programme project in heart transplantation at Stanford.

In 1981, he was a founding member of the International Society for Heart and Lung Transplantation (ISHLT) and chaired their first international programme.

== Early career ==
Edward Stinson was born in 1938 in San Diego, California, and graduated from Stanford University School of Medicine, where he also completed his specialty training in cardiovascular surgery.

=== Experimental surgery ===
In 1965, three years prior to America's first adult human-to-human heart transplant, Stinson was part of the research team that published the classic paper which appraised experimental heart transplants at Stanford University Medical Center and demonstrated that the operative procedure could be successful. Of the just over 30 consecutive orthotopic transplants, most survived the operation until either rejection or immunosuppressant toxicity resulted in death. Two particular adaptations in operative techniques were key to surviving the operation itself and were endorsed in the research. Atrial anastomosis was performed instead of joining the individual pulmonary veins and a teflon cuff wrapped around the aortic anastomosis was used as a seal to prevent a blood leak.

The research provided the basis of knowledge for the world's first heart transplant by Christiaan Barnard and the later Stanford transplant programmes over the following decades when such programmes were shut down elsewhere. The importance of understanding the physiology of the cardiac homograft and the process of rejection was accepted as fundamental to understanding the best way to detect and treat rejection. The issue of accurately detecting early rejection, of which Stinson was also involved, came later.

=== America's first adult heart transplant ===
Stinson was Shumway's most notable resident and the chief resident in 1968 when he assisted Shumway in performing the first adult human-to-human heart transplant procedure in a 54-year-old steelworker, in the United States.

On 6 January 1968, he travelled to El Camino Hospital to bring the donor Virginia White to Stanford with her heart still beating. As soon as the neurologist confirmed White's brain death, surgery began in two adjacent operating theatres. After removing White's heart in room 12, Stinson carried it over in a cold saline filled bowl to Shumway in Room 13.

Later, as professor emeritus of cardiothoracic surgery in 2006, he recalled;

After we removed the recipient’s heart, we stared at the empty pericardial cavity and wondered what we’d actually done.....We proceeded with implanting the new heart. It was pretty exciting to see it start up.

Stinson stayed awake for most of the first five nights after surgery, monitoring recipient Kasperak, while the press continued to report on the whole event.

== Surgery at Stanford ==
Stinson joined the faculty in 1969. During 1970-72 he served as staff associate at the National Heart and Lung Institute Clinic of Surgery while on leave from Stanford. As staff associate, he was responsible for both clinical activity in cardiac surgery in the Clinic of Surgery of the National Heart Lung and Blood Institute and for intramural research programs addressing cardiac physiology and heart transplantation.

=== Cardiac surgery ===
While training with Shumway, Stinson would perform almost exclusively cardiac surgery, with occasional assignments to general surgery. Noted for his skill and speed at surgery, he was known as “Fast Eddie” in the operating theatre.

In 1971, he reported with Shumway, Eugene Dong, D.A. Clark and R. B. Griepp, on the early heart transplants at Stanford. Later, in 1979, with Stuart W. Jamieson and Shumway, he reported on the later successes of heart transplants. This report was one of the developments that helped the recommencement of heart surgery in the UK under Sir Terence English in 1979.

On reflection of the worldwide transplants, Stinson stated

Many centers took up clinical transplantation without the laboratory experience or profound support in clinically related areas such as immunosuppression. They didn’t expect the difficulties that occurred after the operation.

A heart transplant performed in 1970 by Stinson was later reported in the 1995 Guinness book of records when the recipient had survived more than twenty years.

=== Organ rejection ===
In 1972, Stinson and visiting Fellow Philip Caves, with the aim of detecting early organ rejection, performed the first heart biopsy after a heart transplant, a procedure based on an adaptation of a Japanese bioptome.

The following year, they authored the classic paper on transvenous endomyocardial biopsy, with Margaret Billingham and Shumway. He was later described as "academically inspirational".

In late 1980, he was part of the team that first introduced the anti-rejection drug cyclosporine for heart transplantation.

=== The case of prolonged anoxia ===
Stinson led the donor team in the case of Andrew De La Pena in 1986 when a series of unexpected events caused a prolonged ischaemic time between heart removal from the donor and subsequent restoration of coronary circulation in the infant recipient (De La Pena). Despite this, the transplant was successful.

In the week prior to Christmas of 1986 in Fargo, computer software matched a four-month-old infant donor with Stanford's five-month-old Andrew De La Pena, who had a rare heart defect. Stanford was more than 3 hours away from Fargo by flight and the maximum time a heart could remain outside the body before it ran out of oxygen, was considered around four hours. However, Stanford had the experience of more than 400 heart transplants by this time. The decision to bring the donor to Stanford was not possible as the donor liver was to go elsewhere. Both liver and heart teams were required to travel to Fargo and take back the donor organs to their corresponding recipients and shortly Stinson's team found themselves on a specially co-ordinated flight, complete with a “red igloo Playmate cooler” to Fargo's Hector International Airport. After a prolonged operation due to having to remove the liver, an aeroplane breakdown in North Dakota in extreme cold weather in the middle of the night resulted in further delay and prolonged graft anoxia. The whole time the donor heart was kept under strict low temperatures (hypothermia) in the cool box. Stinson was able to arrange from the Governor of North Dakota, George A. Sinner, an F-4 fighter jet (one of two stationed in the State) after surreptitiously being given his private telephone number. Further delays occurred attempting to fit the cooler in the jet. Subsequently, the donor heart was flown to Stanford on the two-seater fighter plane with the pilot only, that is without the donor team. The total anoxic time of the donor heart (Fargo to Stanford) was just short of eight hours, clearly missing the four-hour window.

The story was published in the New York Times Magazine and then picked up by Reader's Digest and was published in a summarised article in February 1988 entitled "A New Heart for Andrew".

De La Pena survived Hodgkins Lymphoma and Hurricane Katrina. 32 years later, in September 2018, he was reunited with the donor parents.

== Research and later career ==
In 1971, the National Institutes of Health awarded Stanford a National Institutes of Health programme project grant for further research, a venture which spanned more than twenty years. Stinson was its chief investigator. In addition, the American Heart Association awarded Stinson with an Established Investigatorship grant.

He became Director of the clinical heart transplant programme and Principal Investigator of the newly awarded programme project grant that provided essential support for clinical and research activities of the transplant programme, including subsequent combined heart and lung transplantation and then isolated lung transplantation.

This core programmatic support from the NIH continued until 1993 by which time thoracic transplantation had become generally accepted by Medicare and the private insurance industry as standard therapy deserving of insurance coverage.

In addition to transplantation, Stinson was active in the entire spectrum of adult cardiac surgery and developed special interests in the surgical treatment of cardiac arrhythmias, infective endocarditis, and hypertrophic obstructive cardiomyopathy. Stinson continued as Director of the clinical heart transplant programme at Stanford until he retired and entered active emeritus status in 1998.

By the year 2000, Stinson's directed Stanford's programme, supported by Shumway, had formed the foundations of expertise that led to 300 worldwide centres and 50,000 heart transplant procedures internationally.

== ISHLT ==
In 1981, Stinson was one of the founding members of the International Society for Heart and Lung Transplantation (ISHLT) along with other well known names in transplantation research including Michael Hess, Jack Copeland, Terence English, Stuart Jamieson, and Michael Kaye. The first official meeting and international programme took place on 14 March 1981 in San Francisco, California with Stinson and Hess and chairmen. He was also on its council between 1982 and 1984.

== Selected publications ==
=== Papers ===
- Stinson, Edward B.; Dong, Eugene; Schroeder, John S.; Harrison, Donald C.; Shumway, Norman E. (1968). "Initial clinical experience with heart transplantation". The American Journal of Cardiology. 22 (6): 791–803. doi:10.1016/0002-9149(68)90174-4. PMID 4880224..
- Bieber, Charles P.; Stinson, Edward B.; Shumway, Norman E. (1969). "Pathology of the Conduction System in Cardiac Rejection". Circulation. 39 (5): 567–575. doi:10.1161/01.CIR.39.5.567. PMID 4892041..
- Stinson, Edward B.; Dong, Eugene; Iben, Albert B.; Shumway, Norman E. (1969). "Cardiac transplantation in man". The American Journal of Surgery. 118 (2): 182–187. doi:10.1016/0002-9610(69)90118-4. PMID 4894795..
- Griepp, RB; Stinson, EB; Clark, DA; Shumway, NE (1970). "A two-year experience with human heart transplantation". Calif Med. 113 (2): 17–26. PMC 1501522. PMID 4950508..
- Stinson, EB (1979). "Surgical treatment of infective endocarditis". Prog Cardiovasc Dis. 22 (3): 145–68. doi:10.1016/0033-0620(79)90020-3. PMID 388517.
- Smith, Julian A.; Oyer, Philip E.; Stinson, Edward B.; Portnor, Peer M.; Reitz, Bruce A.; Shumway, Norman E. (1994). "Bridging to cardiac transplantation with the novacor left ventricular assist system". The Asia Pacific Journal of Thoracic & Cardiovascular Surgery. 3: 17–24. doi:10.1016/1324-2881(94)90051-5..
- Hunt, Sharon A.; Robbins, Robert C.; Stinson, Edward B.; Dyer, Phillip E.; Shumway, Norman E.; Reitz, Bruce A. (1998). "A single center experience with heart retransplantation: The 29 year experience at a single institution". Retransplantation. Transplantation and Clinical Immunology. Vol. 29. pp. 229–236. doi:10.1007/978-0-585-38142-8_28. ISBN 978-0-7923-4937-2..
- Fischell, Tim A.; Stinson, Edward B.; Derby, Geraldine C.; Swerdlow, Charles D. (1987). "Long-term follow-up after surgical correction of Wolff-Parkinson-White syndrome". Journal of the American College of Cardiology. 9 (2): 283–287. doi:10.1016/S0735-1097(87)80376-5. PMID 3805516.
- Robbins, Robert C.; Stinson, Edward B. (1996). "Long-term results of left ventricular myotomy and myectomy for obstructive hypertrophic cardiomyopathy". The Journal of Thoracic and Cardiovascular Surgery. 111 (3): 586–594. doi:10.1016/S0022-5223(96)70310-0. PMID 8601973..

=== Book chapters ===
- Chapter 28. "Cardiac Transplantation, co-authored with N. Shumway, S.W. Jamieson and Philip E. Oyer, in George M. Abouna's Current Status of Clinical Organ Transplantation: with some recent developments in renal surgery, published by Martinus Nijhoff (1984), ISBN 978-94-010-9004-9.
- "Introduction" in Cardiology Clinics, Volume 8, Issue 1, February 1990, pp. 1–2 doi:10.1016/S0733-8651(18)30378-3.
