= Bruce Reitz =

American cardiothoracic surgeon

Bruce A. Reitz
- Occupation: Cardiothoracic surgeon
- Known for: First heart-lung transplantation (1981)

Bruce A. Reitz is an American cardiothoracic surgeon, best known for leading the first combined heart-lung transplantation in 1981 with pioneer heart transplant surgeon Norman Shumway. He obtained an undergraduate degree at Stanford University (B.S. 1966) a medical degree at Yale Medical School (M.D. 1970) and completed an internship at Johns Hopkins Hospital (1971) and residencies and fellowships at Stanford University Hospital (1972 and 1978) the National Institutes of Health (1974). He joined the surgical faculty at Stanford University (1978) then became chief of cardiac surgery at Johns Hopkins University (1982–92) and Chairman of the Department of Cardiothoracic Surgery at Stanford (1992–2005). In 1995 he conducted another pioneering operation: the first Heartport procedure, using a device that allows minimally invasive coronary bypass and valve operations. Reitz also played a major role in the resident education program at Stanford, which he reorganized and maintained.

== Selected publications ==
- "The first successful combined heart–lung transplantation", The Journal of Thoracic and Cardiovascular Surgery, April 2011, Volume 141, Issue 4, pp. 867–869, doi:10.1016/j.jtcvs.2010.12.014
