= Heart–lung transplant =

Procedure carried out to replace both heart and lungs in a single operation

- ICD-9-CM: 33.6
- MeSH: D016041

A heart–lung transplant is a procedure carried out to replace both failing heart and lungs in a single operation. Due to a shortage of suitable donors and because both heart and lung have to be transplanted together, it is a rare procedure; with about 94 to 108 performed annually worldwide.

== Procedure ==
The patient is anesthetised. When the donor organs arrive, they are checked for fitness; if any organs show signs of damage, they are discarded and the operation cancelled.

Once suitable donor organs are present, the surgeon makes an incision starting above and finishing below the sternum, cutting all the way to the bone. The skin edges are retracted to expose the sternum. Using a bone saw, the sternum is cut down the middle. Rib spreaders are inserted in the cut, and spread the ribs to give access to the heart and lungs of the patient.

The patient is connected to a heart–lung machine, which circulates and oxygenates blood. The surgeon removes the failing heart and lungs. Most surgeons endeavour to cut blood vessels as close as possible to the heart to leave room for trimming, especially if the donor heart is of a different size than the original organ.

The donor heart and lungs are positioned and sewn into place. As the donor organs warm up to body temperature, the lungs begin to inflate. The heart may fibrillate at first – this occurs because the cardiac muscle fibres are not contracting synchronously. Internal paddles can be used to apply a small electric shock to the heart to restore proper rhythm.

Once the donor organs are functioning normally, the heart–lung machine is withdrawn, and the chest is closed.

== Qualifying conditions ==
Most candidates for heart–lung transplants have life-threatening damage to both their heart and lungs. In the US, most prospective candidates have between twelve and twenty-four months to live. At any one time, there are about 250 people registered for heart–lung transplantation at the United Network for Organ Sharing (UNOS) in the US, of which around forty will die before a suitable donor is found.

Conditions which may necessitate a heart–lung transplant include:

- Congenital problems (defects present at birth) affecting the heart and lungs (48%);
- Pulmonary hypertension (20%);
- Cystic fibrosis (2%);
- A second transplant after the first transplant was rejected or failed to operate satisfactorily (4%).

Candidates for a heart–lung transplant are usually required to be:

- Under 55 years old;
- Have no other medical conditions (e.g. AIDS, Diabetes, Hepatitis);
- Mentally sound;
- Capable of following a post-operative regimen of exercise and immunosuppressant drugs.

== Post-operation ==
Most patients spend several days in the intensive care unit after the operation. If there are no complications (e.g., infection, rejection), some are able to return home after just two weeks in hospital. Patients will be given anti-rejection drugs and antibiotics to prevent infection as the anti-rejection drugs weaken the immune system. A schedule of frequent follow up visits is necessary.

== Statistics ==
The success rate of heart–lung transplants has improved significantly in recent years. The British National Health Service states that the survival rate is now around 85%, one year after the transplant was performed.

In 2004, there were only 39 heart–lung transplants performed in the entire United States and only 75 worldwide. By comparison, in that same year there were 2,016 heart and 1,173 lung transplants.

== History ==
Norman Shumway laid the groundwork for heart lung transplant with his experiments into heart transplant at Stanford in the mid-1960s. Shumway conducted the first adult heart transplant in the US in 1968.

The first successful heart transplant was performed in South Africa in 1967. The first successful heart–lung transplant was performed at Stanford in the United States, by Bruce Reitz on Mary Gohlke in 1981.

Magdi Yacoub performed the first heart-lung transplant in the United Kingdom in 1983.

Australia's first heart-lung transplant was conducted by Victor Chang at St Vincent's Hospital, Sydney in 1986. Iran's first heart-lung transplant was performed in Tehran in 2002.

== See also ==
- Organ transplant
- Heart transplantation
- Lung transplantation
