= Norman Shumway =

American academic (1923–2006)

- Born: February 9, 1923; Kalamazoo, Michigan, U.S.
- Died: February 10, 2006 (aged 83); Palo Alto, California, U.S.
- Education: John Tarleton Agricultural College, Baylor University, Vanderbilt University, University of Minnesota
- Known for: Organ transplant Ciclosporin
- Awards: Cameron Prize for Therapeutics of the University of Edinburgh (1976); Lister Medal (1994)
- Scientific career
- Fields: Heart Surgery
- Workplaces: Stanford University

Norman Edward Shumway (February 9, 1923 – February 10, 2006) was a pioneer of heart surgery at Stanford University. He was the 67th president of the American Association for Thoracic Surgery and the first to perform an adult human to human heart transplantation in the United States.

== Early life ==
Shumway was born in Kalamazoo, Michigan and brought up as an only child by his parents Norman Edward Shumway and Laura Irene Van der Vliet who ran the dairy in Jackson, Michigan. At school he was a key member of the debating team which won the state debating contest. He graduated from Jackson High School in the summer of 1941 and, in the fall of that year, he entered the University of Michigan where he remained for one year as an undergraduate law student until he was drafted by the Army in 1943. He was sent to John Tarleton Agricultural College in Stephenville, Texas for engineering training and then underwent Army Specialized Training, which included nine months of pre-medical training at Baylor University, followed by enrollment at Vanderbilt University for medical school. He received his M.D. from Vanderbilt in 1949.

== Early surgical career ==
Shumway did his residency at the University of Minnesota under Owen Wangensteen, Chairman of the Department and Walt Lillehei, Chief of Thoracic Surgery and a pioneer in Heart surgery. In 1956, he worked alongside future fellow transplantation pioneer Christiaan Barnard, and in the same year was awarded a surgical doctorate. In 1958, he began working as an instructor in surgery at Stanford Hospital in San Francisco, California, and later, in Palo Alto when the hospital was moved.

He spent many years training promising young residents of cardiology and cardiothoracic surgery at Stanford University. Among his notable trainees is Stanford cardiologist Hannah Valantine, a native of Gambia who was appointed in 2014 as the U.S. National Institutes of Health Chief Officer for Scientific Workforce Diversity. He also worked with pathologist Margaret Billingham in acute organ rejection and trained Philip Caves, cardiothoracic surgeon, who returned to Scotland to work in heart surgery in newborns.

== Heart transplant pioneer ==
Shumway and Barnard crossed paths again in 1966 when Barnard visited Stanford. The United States legislation in 1967 did not allow the acquisition of an organ from a heart beating donor. Following the first heart transplant in 1967 by Barnard in South Africa, the concept of brain death, already described in 1959 by French neurologists, became more widely accepted. This was followed by changing guidelines and legislation in various countries.

In collaboration with Randall B. Griepp, he was the second doctor to carry out a human heart transplant operation in the United States in 1968, after Barnard's operation in South Africa, and Adrian Kantrowitz's at Maimonides Medical Center in Brooklyn, New York, both in 1967. Barnard's work has been noted to be partly based upon the work of Vladimir Demikhov, Shumway and Richard Lower. The early years of the procedure were difficult, with few patients surviving for long. Shumway was the only American surgeon to continue performing the operation after the poor survival outcomes of early transplants.

In the 1970s he and his team refined the transplant operation, tackling the problems of rejection and the necessity for potentially dangerous drugs to suppress the immune system. He pioneered the use of cyclosporine, instead of traditional drugs, which made the operation safer.

Shumway was inspired by Nobel Prize winners Joseph Murray and Peter Medawar.

The world's first heart-lung transplant was performed in 1981, by Shumway and Bruce Reitz.

== Awards ==
- The René Leriche Prize, International society of surgery, 1971.
- The Texas Heart Institute Medal and the Ray C Fish Award for Scientific Achievement in Cardiovascular Diseases, 1972.
- Cameron Prize for Therapeutics of the University of Edinburgh, 1976, for pioneering use of cyclosporine in heart transplant surgery.
- International Recognition Award, Heart Research Foundation, 1982.
- Gold Heart Award, American Heart Association, for contributions to Cardiovascular Medicine, 1982.
- Distinguished Alumnus Award, 1983.
- Outstanding Achievement Award, University of Minnesota, 1985.
- Michael DeBakey Award, Michael E DeBakey International Surgical Society, 1986.
- The Rudolph Matas Award in Cardiovascular Surgery, Tulane University, 1986.
- In his later years Shumway was the first recipient of the Lifetime Achievement Award given by the International Society for Heart and Lung Transplantation (ISHLT). He also received the 1994 Lister Medal.
- Honorary degree, University of Pavia, 1998.

== Family life ==
Shumway's marriage to the former Mary Lou Stuurmans ended in divorce. The couple had four children, one of whom directs heart and lung transplantation at the University of Minnesota.

== Cancer and death ==
Shumway died of lung cancer in Palo Alto in 2006, on the day after his 83rd birthday. He has been described as 'humble', 'focused' and shying away from publicity.

== Selected publications ==
- "Suppression of Rejection Crises In the Cardiac Homograft", co-authored with Richard R. Lower and Eugene Dong The Annals of Thoracic Surgery, September 1965, VOL. 1, NO. 5, pp. 645–649.
