= Therapy =

Attempted medical remediation of a health problem

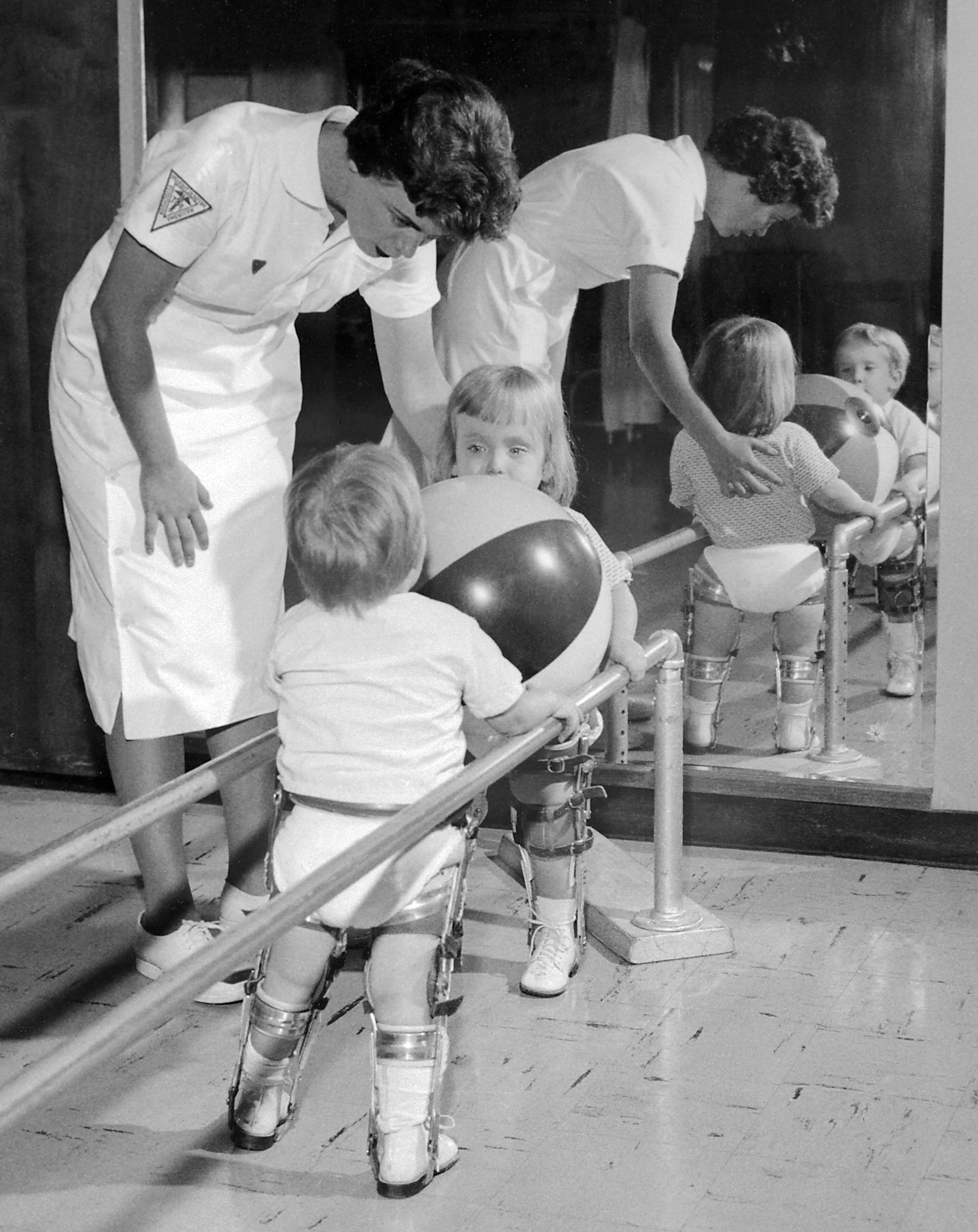
- Children undergoing physical therapy (polio)
- MeSH: D013812

A therapy or medical treatment is the attempted remediation of a health problem, usually following a medical diagnosis. Both words, treatment and therapy, are often abbreviated Tx, or T_{x}.

As a rule, each therapy has indications and contraindications. There are many different types of therapy. Not all therapies are effective. Many therapies can produce unwanted adverse effects.

Treatment and therapy are often synonymous, especially in the usage of health professionals. However, in the context of mental health, the term therapy may refer specifically to psychotherapy.

A therapist is a person who offers any modality of therapy. Therapist refers to trained professionals engaged in providing services any kind of treatment or rehabilitation.

== Semantic field ==
The words care, therapy, treatment, and intervention overlap in a semantic field, and thus they can be synonymous depending on context. Moving rightward through that order, the connotative level of holism decreases and the level of specificity (to concrete instances) increases. Thus, in health-care contexts (where its senses are always noncount), the word care tends to imply a broad idea of everything done to protect or improve someone's health (for example, as in the terms preventive care and primary care, which connote ongoing action), although it sometimes implies a narrower idea (for example, in the simplest cases of wound care or postanesthesia care, a few particular steps are sufficient, and the patient's interaction with the provider of such care is soon finished). In contrast, the word intervention tends to be specific and concrete, and thus the word is often countable; for example, one instance of cardiac catheterization is one intervention performed, and coronary care (noncount) can require a series of interventions (count). At the extreme, the piling on of such countable interventions amounts to interventionism, a flawed model of care lacking holistic circumspection—merely treating discrete problems (in billable increments) rather than maintaining health. Therapy and treatment, in the middle of the semantic field, can connote either the holism of care or the discreteness of intervention, with context conveying the intent in each use. Accordingly, they can be used in both noncount and count senses (for example, therapy for chronic kidney disease can involve several dialysis treatments per week).

The words aceology and iamatology are obscure and obsolete synonyms referring to the study of therapies.

The English word therapy comes via Latin therapīa from Ancient Greek: θεραπεία and means "curing" or "healing". The term therapeusis is a somewhat archaic doublet of the word therapy.

== Types of therapies ==
Therapy as a treatment for physical or mental condition is based on knowledge usually from one of three separate fields (or a combination of them): conventional medicine (allopathic, Western biomedicine, relying on scientific approach and evidence-based practice), traditional medicine (age-old cultural practices), and alternative medicine (healthcare procedures "not readily integrated into the dominant healthcare model").

=== By chronology, priority, or intensity ===
==== Levels of care ====
Levels of care classify health care into categories of chronology, priority, or intensity, as follows:

- Urgent care handles health issues that need to be handled today but are not necessarily emergencies; the urgent care venue can send a patient to the emergency care level if it turns out to be needed.
  - In the United States (and possibly various other countries), urgent care centers also serve another function as their other main purpose: U.S. primary care practices have evolved in recent decades into a configuration whereby urgent care centers provide portions of primary care that cannot wait a month, because getting an appointment with the primary care practitioner is often subject to a wait list of 2 to 8 weeks.
- Emergency care handles medical emergencies and is a first point of contact or intake for less serious problems, which can be referred to other levels of care as appropriate. This therapy is often given to patients before a definitive diagnosis is made.
- Intensive care, also called critical care, is care for extremely ill or injured patients. It thus requires high resource intensity, knowledge, and skill, as well as quick decision making.
- Ambulatory care is care provided on an outpatient basis. Typically patients can walk into and out of the clinic under their own power (hence "ambulatory"), usually on the same day. This care type also involves surgery which, according to recent research, offers "generally superior 30-day outcomes relative to inpatient-based care".
- Home care is care at home, including care from providers (such as physicians, nurses, and home health aides) making house calls, care from caregivers such as family members, and patient self-care.
- Primary care is meant to be the main kind of care in general, and ideally a medical home that unifies care across referred providers. The current trend in this area is digitalization aiming to ensure open access to information about therapy, issues, and recent progress on biomedical research.
- Secondary care is care provided by medical specialists and other health professionals who generally do not have first contact with patients, for example, cardiologists, urologists and dermatologists. A patient reaches secondary care as a next step from primary care, typically by provider referral although sometimes by patient self-initiative. According to a systematic review, fields for development secondary care from patients' viewpoint may be classified into four domains that should usefully guide future improvement of this care stage: "barriers to care, communication, coordination, and relationships and personal value".
- Tertiary care is specialized consultative care, usually for inpatients and on referral from a primary or secondary health professional, in a facility that has personnel and facilities for advanced medical investigation and treatment, such as a tertiary referral hospital.
- Follow-up care is additional care during or after convalescence. Aftercare is generally synonymous with follow-up care. One of the key areas of development–Tele-health, including non-clinical services: provider training, administrative meetings, and continuing medical education–offers opportunities to improve access to care, increase provider and patient productivity through reduced travel, potential expenses savings, and the ability to expand services.
- End-of-life care is care near the end of one's life. It often includes the following:
  - Palliative care is supportive care, most especially (but not necessarily) near the end of life.
  - Hospice care is palliative care very near the end of life when cure is very unlikely. Its main goal is comfort, both physical and mental. A systematic meta review showed that the most cost-efficient one relates to home-based end-of-life care, including reduced overall "resource use and improved patient and carer outcomes".

==== Lines of therapy ====
Treatment decisions often follow formal or informal algorithmic guidelines. Treatment options can often be ranked or prioritized into lines of therapy: first-line therapy, second-line therapy, third-line therapy, and so on. First-line therapy (sometimes referred to as induction therapy, primary therapy, or front-line therapy) is the first therapy that will be tried. Its priority over other options is usually either: (1) formally recommended on the basis of clinical trial evidence for its best-available combination of efficacy, safety, and tolerability or (2) chosen based on the clinical experience of the physician. If a first-line therapy either fails to resolve the issue or produces intolerable side effects, additional (second-line) therapies may be substituted or added to the treatment regimen, followed by third-line therapies, and so on.

An example of a context in which the formalization of treatment algorithms and the ranking of lines of therapy is very extensive is chemotherapy regimens. Because of the great difficulty in successfully treating some forms of cancer, one line after another may be tried. In oncology the count of therapy lines may reach 10 or even 20.

Often multiple therapies may be tried simultaneously (combination therapy or polytherapy). Thus combination chemotherapy is also called polychemotherapy, whereas chemotherapy with one agent at a time is called single-agent therapy or monotherapy. Single-agent therapy is a care algorithm that focuses on one specific drug or procedure. It utilizes a single therapeutic agent rather than combining multiple ones. Multiagent Therapy is a treatment by two or more drugs or procedures. Comprehensive therapy combines various forms of medical treatment to provide the most effective care for patients.

Adjuvant therapy is therapy given in addition to the primary, main, or initial treatment, but simultaneously (as opposed to second-line therapy). Neoadjuvant therapy is therapy that is begun before the main therapy. Thus one can consider surgical excision of a tumor as the first-line therapy for a certain type and stage of cancer even though radiotherapy is used before it; the radiotherapy is neoadjuvant (chronologically first but not primary in the sense of the main event). Premedication is conceptually not far from this, but the words are not interchangeable; cytotoxic drugs to put a tumor "on the ropes" before surgery delivers the "knockout punch" are called neoadjuvant chemotherapy, not premedication, whereas things like anesthetics or prophylactic antibiotics before dental surgery are called premedication.

Step therapy or stepladder therapy is a specific type of prioritization by lines of therapy. It is controversial in American health care because unlike conventional decision-making about what constitutes first-line, second-line, and third-line therapy, which in the U.S. reflects safety and efficacy first and cost only according to the patient's wishes, step therapy attempts to mix cost containment by someone other than the patient (third-party payers) into the algorithm.

Therapy freedom refers to prescription for use of an unlicensed medicine (without a marketing authorization issued by the licensing authority of the country) and the negotiation between individual and group rights are involved. A comprehensive research in Australia, Czech Republic, India, Israel, Italy, Netherlands, Spain, Serbia, Sweden, UK, and USA showed that the rate of the unlicensed medicine prescription has been reported to range from 0.3 to 35% depending on the country. In many jurisdictions, therapy freedom is limited to cases of no treatment existing that is both well-established and more efficacious.

=== By intent ===
| Therapy type | Description |
|---|---|
| abortive therapy | A therapy that is intended to stop a medical condition from progressing any further. A medication taken at the earliest signs of a disease, such as an analgesic taken at the first symptoms of a migraine headache to prevent it from getting worse, is an abortive therapy. Compare abortifacients, which abort a pregnancy. |
| bridge therapy | A therapy that figuratively provides a bridge to another step or phase, crossing over some immediate chasm (challenge), in contrast with destination therapy, which is the final therapy in cases where clinically appropriate. |
| consolidation therapy | A therapy given to consolidate the gains from induction therapy. In cancer, this means chasing after any malignant cells that may be left. |
| curative therapy | A therapy with curative intent, that is, one that seeks to cure the root cause of a disorder. (also called etiotropic therapy) |
| definitive therapy | A therapy that may be final, superior to others, curative, or all of those. |
| destination therapy | A therapy that is the final destination rather than a bridge to another therapy. Usually refers to ventricular assist devices to keep the existing heart going, not just until heart transplantation can occur, but for the rest of the patient's life expectancy. |
| empiric therapy | A therapy given on an empiric basis; that is, one given according to a clinician's educated guess despite uncertainty about the illness's causative factors. For example, empiric antibiotic therapy administers a broad-spectrum antibiotic immediately on the basis of a good chance (given the history, physical examination findings, and risk factors present) that the illness is bacterial and will respond to that drug (even though the bacterial species or variant is not yet known). |
| gold standard therapy | A therapy that is definitive, just as a gold standard diagnostic test is a definitive test. |
| investigational therapy | An experimental therapy. Use of experimental therapies must be ethically justified, because by definition they raise the question of standard of care. Physicians have autonomy to provide empirical care (such as off-label care) according to their experience and clinical judgment, but the autonomy has limits that preclude quackery. Thus it may be necessary to design a clinical trial around the new therapy and to use the therapy only per a formal protocol. Sometimes shorthand phrases such as "treated on protocol" imply not just "treated according to a plan" but specifically "treated with investigational therapy". |
| maintenance therapy | A therapy taken during disease remission to prevent relapse. |
| palliative therapy | See supportive therapy for connotative distinctions. |
| preventive therapy (prophylactic therapy) | A therapy that is intended to prevent a medical condition from occurring (also called prophylaxis). For example, many vaccines prevent infectious diseases. |
| salvage therapy (rescue therapy) | A therapy tried after others have failed; it may be a "last-line" therapy. |
| stepdown therapy | Therapy that tapers the dosage gradually rather than abruptly cutting it off. For example, a switch from intravenous to oral antibiotics as an infection is brought under control steps down the intensity of therapy. |
| supportive therapy | A therapy that does not treat or improve the underlying condition, but rather increases the patient's comfort, also called symptomatic treatment (see there for more information). For example, supportive care for flu, colds, or gastrointestinal upset can include rest, fluids, and over-the-counter pain relievers; those things do not treat the cause, but they treat the symptoms and thus provide relief. Supportive therapy may be palliative therapy (palliative care). The two terms are sometimes synonymous, but palliative care often specifically refers to serious illness and end-of-life care. Therapy may be categorized as having curative intent (when it is possible to eliminate the disease) or palliative intent (when eliminating the disease is impossible and the focus shifts to minimizing the distress that it causes). The two are often contradistinguished (mutually exclusive) in some contexts (such as the management of some cancers), but they are not inherently mutually exclusive; often therapy can be both curative and palliative simultaneously. Supportive psychotherapy aims to support the patient by alleviating the worst of the symptoms, with the expectation that definitive therapy can follow later if possible. |
| systemic therapy | A therapy that is systemic. In the physiological sense, this means affecting the whole body (rather than being local or locoregional), whether via systemic administration, systemic effect, or both. Systemic therapy in the psychotherapeutic sense seeks to address people not only on the individual level but also as people in relationships, dealing with the interactions of groups. |

=== By intervention ===
- Invasive therapy is achieved either through surgery or through the use of drugs. Medical invasive treatments can be divided into two main categories: pharmacotherapy and surgery.
- Noninvasive therapies are medical treatments that do not involve entry into the body. It can be classified into five main categories: neurotherapy, physical therapy, occupational therapy, radiation therapy, and psychotherapy. The latest trend in noninvasive therapy is remote treatment, which is experiencing significant global growth via telecommunication technologies. Teletherapy encompasses three practices of remote treatment: telepsychiatry, telepsychology, and teleneurotherapy. This approach to medical treatment uses telecommunication technologies to provide exclusively mental or neurological therapy at a distance.

== See also ==
- Biophilia hypothesis
- Classification of Pharmaco-Therapeutic Referrals
- Compassion-focused therapy
- Emotionally focused therapy
- Greyhound therapy
- Inverse benefit law
- List of therapies
- Mature minor doctrine
- Medication
- Medicine
- Nutraceutical
- Prevention
- Psychedelic therapy
- Therapeutic inertia
- Therapeutic nihilism, the idea that treatment is useless
- Treatment as prevention
