= Ventracor =

Former medical devices company in Australia

Ventracor Limited (ASX code: VCR, ACN 003 180 372) was an Australian public company that commercialised and clinically tested an implantable left ventricular assist device (LVAD) known as VentrAssist. Approval for use of VentrAssist, in Australia and the European Union, was achieved. It was carrying out clinical trials for US FDA approval, when it succumbed to financial difficulties, in 2009, after a share purchase plan failed to raise A$10 million. Its intellectual property and clinical test data were sold to a rival, Thoratec, a company already offering VAD devices in the US market, and further development or trialling of VentrAssist effectively ended.

== Foundation and growth ==
The company was founded by Dr John Campbell Woodard, who raised $3.5 million, which was matched dollar-for-dollar by an Australian government program R & D Start. His qualifications included a Bachelor in Electrical Engineering, a Master of Science in Biophysics, and a Doctor of Philosophy in Biomedical Engineering, all from the University of New South Wales. Prior to forming Ventracor, his career was in development of medical devices in Australia and the USA. By 2010, he held fourteen patents in the area of medical devices. Woodard held the position of Ventracor's Chief Scientific Officer, from 2005 up to the time that the company's operations ceased. After Ventracor, he joined a company working in the same field, based in the USA.

VentrAssist was a continuous-flow VAD, with a centrifical pump rotor—its only moving part—using hydrodynamic suspension. It was intended for patients with end stage heart failure. It consisted of an implanted heart pump and an externally-worn control box. The first patent for the device was granted in 2001, and it was first implanted into a human patient, at The Alfred Hospital in Melbourne, in June 2003. The devices were sold for around $100,000 each.

The corporate structure that became Ventracor was listed on the Australian Securities Exchange on 17 August 1993, under the name Micromedical Industries Limited. It changed its name to Ventracor Limited on 11 July 2002, soon after the corporate structure became the one commercialising the VentrAssist LVAD. Michael Spooner became the CEO around that time. In September 2003 he stated that the company planned to begin clinical trials in Europe in early 2004 and in the US in late 2004. He expressed satisfaction that the company had been able to establish its operations in Australia, opining that Australian companies often failed to reach their full potential because talented employees were attracted to overseas companies by extraordinarily high salaries.

In October 2003, Spooner raised $33.75 million via a share placement and 1-for-12 renounceable rights issue, at $2.25 per share. In what was seen as a lack of confidence in the company's future, the chairman, John Massey, and two non-executive directors, Elizabeth Nosworthy and Katherine Woodthorpe, chose to sell their rights rather than take up new shares. Their decision was reported to have angered many shareholders.

== New management and clinical trials ==
The company's board appointed Dr Colin Sutton as Managing Director, on 11 November 2003, replacing Michael Spooner. Spooner had just raised funding for trials, and had grown the company's market capitalization from $15 million to $440 million. The share price fell 9 cents to $2.27 upon the unexpected news of his replacement. The share price had peaked in 2003 at nearly $4, valuing the company at around $600 million. The sudden change in CEO suggested a fundamental change in the company's direction, from retaining its model of growth as an independent company to being 'dressed' for sale to new owners.

By July 2005, Ventracore shares were trading around $1.25, and the company was locked in a legal dispute over an alleged patent infringement by another company HeartWare. The dispute was settled, with both companies pressing ahead with their own VADs. HeartWare claimed that the smaller physical size of their device made it better than VentrAssist.

A clinical trial of VentrAssist as a bridge-to-transplant device was conducted in Australia, Norway and the United Kingdom, between 2004 and 2006, to obtain the CE Mark. 25 of the 30 patients (83%) were transplanted or transplant-eligible at the completion of the trial. There were no reported uncontrolled stops of the VentrAssist devices under the trial. By 2007, there were 43 patient-years of implanted VentrAssist device operation, and 87 patients who had been implanted with the device at 14 centres. At that time, the maximum implanted time of any of the devices was 2.7 years. CE Mark approval was achieved in December 2006, allowing VentrAssit to go to market within the European Union.

CEO Colin Sutton prioritised the US market. Peter Crosby—like Sutton, a former employee of the Nucleus Group company Telectronics— became Chief Operations Officer in January 2005 and Chief Executive Officer in July 2006, when Sutton retired.

2008 emerged as a critical year for Ventracor; an investor update in March 2008, announced that the US Food and Drug Administration had given its final approval of the protocol to be applied for a bridge-to-transplant clinical trail and conditional approval of the protocol for a destination clinical trial. The company had set up a facility in San Francisco, by March 2008, to support the trial and the US market generally.

In April 2008, John Massey retired as chairman and was replaced by Peter Ward, who had been a non-executive director since 2001. In a statement issued at the time, Massey said "After ten years as Chairman of Ventracor, the time is ripe for a change. It is appropriate that I leave when Ventracor's future is looking bright. I am very pleased to have been a member of the team at Ventracor and I am confident that the Company is on the right track to build a profitable, sustainable, global medical device business of which Australia can be proud."

== Difficulties ==
The company commenced a clinical trial to gain US FDA approval of VentrAssist, which would have allowed access to the US market. Before that trial was completed, however, it was running short of funds. Sales revenue for the 2007-2008 financial year was $17.3 million, and Ventracore had sold around half of the total of 325 heart pumps sold to then, during that same period. Total revenue for the year had been A$19.473 million, up 163%. Nonetheless, although it was 43% lower than the previous year, Ventracor's annual net loss was $24.9 million for the 2007-2008 financial year. By the beginning of September 2008, following the announcement of the 2007-2008 results, the share price was around $0.20.

Shareholders were reported to be upset by an 80% fall in the company's share price, since Crosby had become CEO, the prospects of more funding being needed—diluting the value of existing shareholdings—and that Crosby was being paid $2.5 million as an annual salary, reportedly making him the 51st highest paid CEO of an ASX listed company.

The first budget of the newly-elected first Rudd ministry, in May 2008, abolished the grant program known as Commercial Ready. Ventracor had a grant under that program approved, in January 2008, but that would be the last one it would be able to access. On 7 July 2008, the company's trademark, VentrAssist apparently was transferred to another company VentrAssist Pty Ltd (ACN/ARBN 064 667 394). The company also relocated its US facility from San Francisco to Budd Lake, expecting that this location, being closer to the clinical trial sites, would bring savings.

In an interview in early September 2008, Peter Crosby stated that the company was looking to raise up to $22 million to fund the company to mid-2009. He noted that revenues of the rival Throratec had "taken off" with the FDA pre-market approval of that company's 'second generation' heart pump, in April 2008; he described the situation facing Ventracor and its competitors, “It’s a time to market play. The first two or three will take 90 percent of the market.”

The company attempted to make a share placement and engaged an investment bank to assist it, but after the collapse of Lehman Brothers interest in such a placement disappeared. During 2008, the Global Financial Crisis (GFC) caused the ASX index to fall by 32.4%, over a six month period. Although the index later recovered, the environment for new capital raising was dire during the immediate aftermath of the GFC.

Ventracor's 17,500 shareholders overwhelmingly were small retail investors, and the company lacked institutional investors or a cornerstone investor. In November 2008, seen almost as a last resort, Ventracor sought to obtain just A$10 million in additional capital, from its existing shareholders, via a share purchase plan. Up to $5,000 in new shares were offered to each existing shareholder, at a share price of $0.081, reflecting the recent poor performance of the share price. The letter from the chairman, announcing the share purchase plan, also included some disturbing information; final FDA approval, after allowing for the collation of results and the FDA's internal reviews was still years away, the company was rapidly running out of funds, and it was scaling back some activities to prioritise others. It was hardly a compelling case. With the shares trading, by then, at under $0.10, many shareholders had already lost most of their earlier investment, and were reluctant to throw good money after bad.

Only A$3.5 million was subscribed to the share purchase plan—by shareholders whom financial journalist Alan Kohler later characterized as "those who were paying attention and knew what was at stake"—and that being an insufficient amount, the money was returned to the subscribing shareholders. In an announcement dated 11 December 2008, in which the failure of the capital raising was revealed, the chairman, John Ward announced that the company was seeking expressions of interest from third parties to acquire the company or take a "strategic stake" in it.

On 12 January 2009, Michael Fox, claiming to represent a group of shareholders holding 5% of the share register, stated that the group intended to move to spill the board of directors at an extraordinary shareholders' meeting to be held in February 2009. Specifically, they were seeking to replace John Ward, Ross Harricks, Elizabeth Nosworthy, Jeffrey Goodman and William Curran, but retain Peter Crosby as CEO and Managing Director. Their candidates for directors would have been Vijay Kakani—an investor—Michael Fox, and Anthony Davis. They sent a letter to Ventracor shareholders, outlining cost-cutting measures and other planned actions. Subsequent events were to overtake this push to change the board.

Later in January 2009, there was a report that a sale to a US cardio device maker, Abiomed, was imminent. Ventracor shares were suspended from trading on 10 February 2009, last trading at 8.3 cents. Ventracor shares were never traded again after that date. The suspension, made at the company's request, was "pending the release of an announcement regarding the LVA4 VentrAssist LVD, the Company's financial position and the status of discussions with third parties regarding the potential sale of the Company." But, as Ventracor's financial woes continued unabated, there was less incentive for a buyer to pay a fair price to buy Ventracor, as a going concern, rather than wait for a 'fire sale' opportunity upon its liquidation. With the trading of Ventracor's shares suspended, there was also no prospect of an on-market takeover bid taking advantage of the low share price. As the company burned through its remaining cash, the failed capital raising assumed a critical importance in later events.

On 12 March 2009, the company announced via the ASX that it had successfully completed the bridge-to-transplant clinical trial. The CEO Peter Crosby, stated in the announcement, "We are proud that the VentrAssist LVAD is the first centrifugal pump, and the first third generation pump, to complete a clinical trial in the US. We look forward to compiling the results ready for an application to the US FDA for Pre-Market Approval." That would never happen. Only a few days later on, 19 March 2009, the company was put into voluntary administration.

Reportedly over 130 organisations in Australia, Europe and the US had been offered stakes in the company, but nothing had eventuated. The company declared that it no longer had funds to continue operation up to 30 June 2009. It was reported that former CEO, Michael Spooner, was involved in moves to replace the board and senior management. Separately, a group of shareholders was attempting to call an extraordinary general meeting, to sack the board of directors, but the board acted first, by putting the company into voluntary administration, while it was still solvent. The members of the board at the time were, its chairman, Peter Ward—a former CEO of Qantas—CEO Peter Crosby, Elizabeth Nosworthy—lawyer, former director of Telstra, and director of various other Australian companies— and US directors, Jeff Goodman, Ross Harricks and Bill Curran. This board remained in place, until the directors all resigned, effective from 11 June 2009.

== Under administration ==
The administrators were Steven Sherman and John Gothard of the firm Ferrier Hodgson. They produced a report for the company's creditors, dated 20 May 2009, in which they recommended that the company be put into liquidation rather than pursue a sale under a Deed of Arrangement. The report identified two reasons for the company's failure; the effect of "the present economic crisis" on the ability to secure adequate financing and Ventracor shareholders' losing confidence in the company.

An attempt by a group of shareholders to keep Ventracor operating failed. The group of shareholders proposed to inject $2.2 million, in a debt for equity swap, but finally withdrew the offer just ahead of a creditors' meeting on 3 July 2009. Two other parties had expressed some interest and one (Siqro) financed the company's continued operation, under a Deed of Arrangement, up to 19 June 2009, but then found itself unable to provide the next payment. The Administrators scrambled to keep the company afloat, but on 29 June 2009, they announced to shareholders that a wind-down of company operations had begun, on the evening of 23 June 2009, and a creditors' meeting was called for 3 July 2009. The announcement ended ominously, "On the basis that there will be no sale of the Ventracor business, at this time it is not expected that there will be any return to shareholders". The creditors' meeting, held on 3 July 2009, voted unanimously to terminate the Deed of Arrangement and put Ventracor Limited into liquidation.

== Aftermath ==
The minister Kim Carr had declined to provide Ventracor with further Australian government support. The government's General Employee Entitlements and Redundancy Scheme subsequently paid around $3.4 million that was owed to 110 Australian employees of the, by then, failed company.

The intellectual property and clinical trial data were sold to Thoratec, for $1.15 million. Thoratec already had an FDA-approved VAD. Their modest investment in the VentrAssist technology put it beyond the reach of any potential competitor, effectively safeguarding Thoratec's own investments in VAD technology. This resulted in the cessation of the VentrAssist development program.

Ventracor was delisted from the ASX on 31 August 2009, and was deregistered as a company on 7 June 2013, following the completion of the disposal of its assets. A loss declaration was issued on 18 August 2009, which allowed a capital loss to be claimed for tax purposes, by the shareholders of Ventracor, in the financial year 2009-2010. That tax loss was all that the shareholders received from their investment in the company. It was reported that, up to April 2009, over A$200 million had been invested in the artificial heart pump technology, funded by investors and government grants.

When the company ceased operations, around 150 patients still had VentrAssist devices in place, and how those life-critical devices would be supported was uncertain at that time. The TGA conformance certificates that had been issued for Ventracor's technology were cancelled in September 2009.

The company's research and manufacturing facility was located in Chatswood, New South Wales, in a part of a landscaped industrial research facility originally built by the National Acoustics Laboratory and Ultrasonics Institute, the research division of what is now Hearing Australia. It now houses the Advanced Organization and Saint Hill ANZO of the Church of Scientology. The once extensive purpose-built research facility is no longer used for scientific research, but now "provides advanced religious services to Scientologists from across Australia, New Zealand and the Asia Pacific region". Ventracor also had a facility at Budd Lake, New Jersey.

2009 saw not only the demise of Ventracor but the delisting of another Australian technology company, ERG Limited. Another (dual-listed) artificial heart company and erstwhile rival of Ventracor, HeartWare, delisted from the ASX in 2013. HeartWare was bought by an Irish-registered company, Medtronic, in a US$1.1 billion deal in 2016. However, their 'HVAD' VAD product was withdrawn, on 3 June 2021, due to safety concerns following some patient injuries and deaths.

The Australian Securities Exchange (ASX) is notable for the low number of high-tech firms in its listings, with many Australian-founded high-tech firms choosing to list in other countries, particularly the US. In 2025, the ASX is overwhelmingly dominated by just two sectors, Financial Services (34.1% by value) and Basic Materials (19.1%), with none of the remaining nine sectors, individually, exceeding 9% of its value. In 2023, the Australian economy was ranked 93rd out of 133 countries—behind Uganda—in the index of economic complexity produced by researchers at Harvard University, and is one of the least complex economies of any developed nation.

The global market for heart pump devices was estimated to be worth US$3.67 billion, in 2025, and expected to increase to US$8.03 billion by 2030. A VentrAssist device is held in the collection of the Powerhouse Museum. The Australian patents, once held by Ventracor and later owned by Thoratec, have now either expired or will do so during 2026.
