= Rodger Ford =

American businessman

Rodger Ford is the managing partner at Anthem Equity Group. He has also managed two medical device companies.

Ford founded AlphaGraphics, a printshop business, in 1970. In 1979, the company began franchising its operations and, during the 1980s, helped the company grow their franchise business. Alpha began expanding internationally in the late 1980s / early 1990s.

Ford also co-founded PetsHotel, an upscale hotel for dogs and cats. PetSmart acquired PetsHotel from Ford in 2000.

In 2004, Ford was appointed to the board of directors at Syncardia and he became CEO in 2005. During Ford’s tenure at CEO, Syncardia advanced the portability and effectiveness of their artificial heart technology.

Ford then left Syncardia to become CEO and chairman of the board at MicroMed Cardiovascular. In October 2013, Ford became chairman and CEO of ReliantHeart, the successor in interest to Micromed.
