= Stephen Westaby =

British cardiac surgeon

Stephen Westaby (born 27 July 1948) is a retired English heart surgeon from Scunthorpe, Lincolnshire who worked at the John Radcliffe Hospital, Oxford, England.

== Career ==
Westaby and his team performed Peter Houghton's heart operation in June 2000, implanting a Jarvik 2000 artificial left ventricular assist device, a turbine pump. Peter Houghton (1938–2007) became the longest living person with an electrical artificial heart pump in the world.

His memoir of his career as a heart surgeon, Open Heart: A Heart Surgeon’s Stories of Life and Death on the Operating Table, was published in 2017 by HarperCollins. The book was shortlisted for the 2017 Costa Book Awards Biography Award and won the 2017 BMA president's choice award. A second memoir, The Knife's Edge: The Heart and Mind of a Cardiac Surgeon, was published by HarperCollins in 2019.
