= Jack Copeland (surgeon) =

American cardiothoracic surgeon

Professor Jack Copeland
- Born: Jack Greene Copeland; 1942 (age 83–84); Roanoke, Virginia
- Education: Stanford University
- Known for: Heart transplantation
- Spouse(s): Hannah Copeland, MD, FACS, FACC
- Medical career
- Profession: Cardiothoracic surgeon
- Institutions: University of Arizona Medical Center (UAMC) in Tucson; University of California, San Diego
- Research: Artificial heart; Left ventricular assist device
- Awards: 2001 Barney Clark Award; ISHLT Past Pioneer Award 2013

Jack Greene Copeland (born 1942) is an American cardiothoracic surgeon, who has established procedures in heart transplantation including repeat heart transplantation, the implantation of total artificial hearts (TAH) to bridge the time to heart transplant, innovations in left ventricular assist devices (LVAD) and the technique of "piggybacking" a second heart (heterotopic heart transplant) in a person, while leaving them the original.

In 1985, he performed the first successful implant of the Jarvik 7 artificial heart for the purpose of gaining time until a suitable heart donor could be found. The 25-year-old recipient received the heart transplant within two weeks of the implant and survived more than five years.

Copeland co-founded SynCardia Systems and after being head of the cardiothoracic surgery programme at the University of Arizona Medical Center (UAMC) in Tucson for over thirty years, he moved to the University of California, San Diego in 2010.

He was one of the first presidents of the International Society of Heart and Lung Transplantation (ISHLT), a society he helped co-found and who awarded him its Past Pioneer Award in 2013.

== Early life and education ==
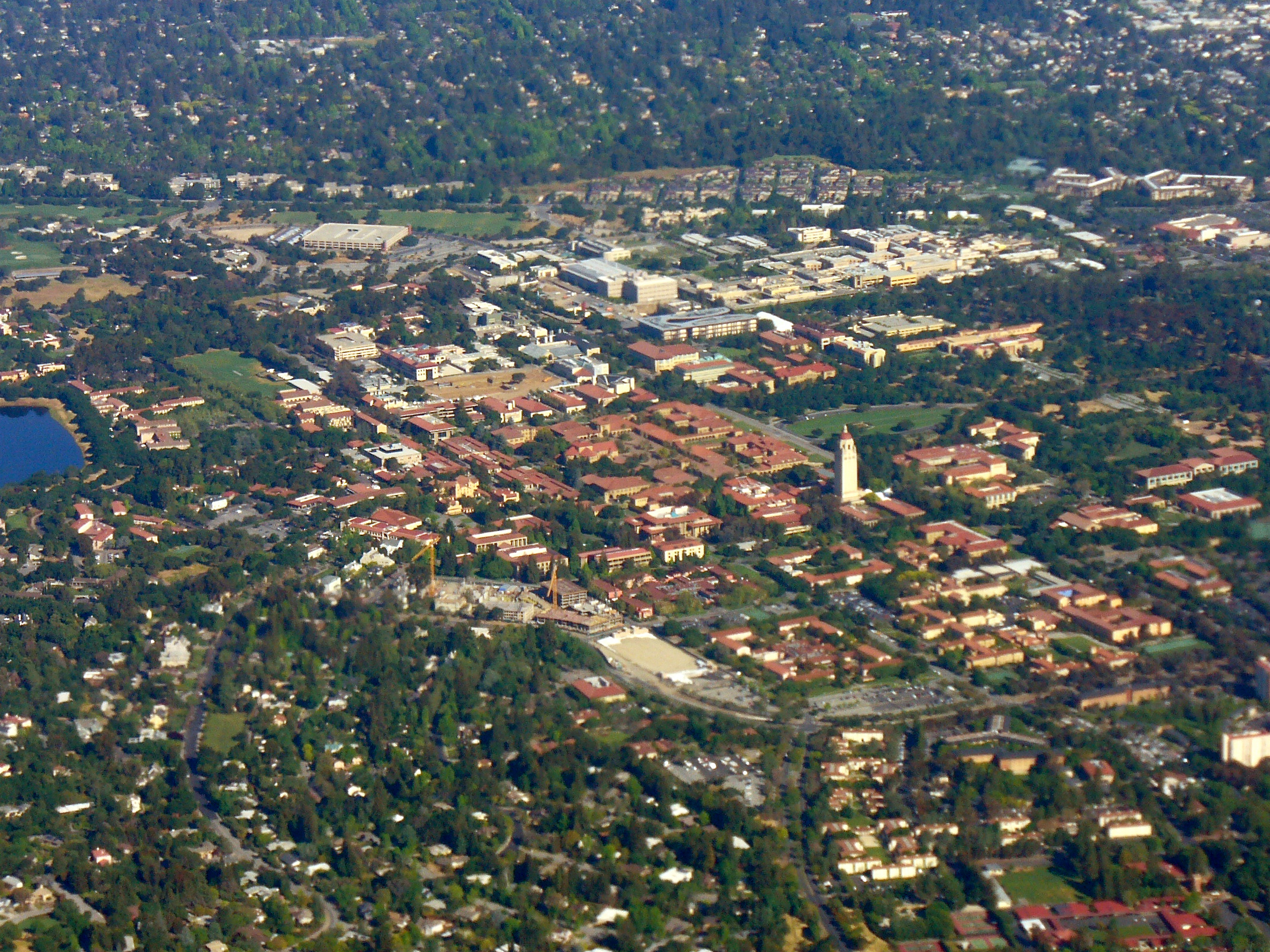
Stanford Campus Aerial Photo

Jack Copeland was born in 1942 in Roanoke, Virginia and is the son of a chemical engineer. He entered Stanford University as a biology major in 1960, and subsequently earned a medical degree there nine years later. His interest in transplant surgery stemmed from his medical student days at Stanford, when he took up a job assisting in heart transplants in animals.

== Early career ==
Copeland completed his internship and residency at the University Hospital of San Diego County, then assisted at the National Heart, Lung, and Blood Institute at Bethesda, Maryland, where he reported on extended heart preservation outside the body, before returning to Stanford. At Stanford, he became chief resident of cardiac surgery and in 1977 reported the first successful repeat-heart transplant in a human.

He was inspired predominantly by heart surgeons Norman Shumway and Edward Stinson and he learned the technique of endomyocardial biopsy and interpretation of organ rejection grading from cardiothoracic surgeon Philip Caves and pathologist Margaret Billingham.

The University of Arizona hired Copeland in 1977 and two years later he led the first heart transplant in Arizona.

In 1982 Copeland stated that heart transplants were "no longer consider[ed] … an experiment here. It has become a routine and predictable procedure".

At Arizona, he was one of the first surgeons in the country to try the technique of "piggybacking" a second heart in a person, while leaving them the original, a procedure first performed by South African heart surgeon Christiaan Barnard.

By 1985, at the age 43, when he was head of the Cardiovascular and Thoracic Surgery Section at the University of Arizona College of Medicine in Tucson, his team had performed over sixty such transplants. In addition, in 1985, he performed Arizona's first combined heart-lung transplant.

=== The first bridge-to-transplant with a total artificial heart ===
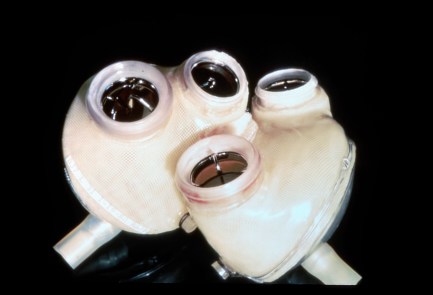
JARVIK 7 TAH, used in 1985 as a bridge-to-transplant

In 1985, Copeland and Mark Levinson with help from biomedical engineer Richard Smith, performed the first successful implant of the Jarvik 7 total artificial heart, the early version of the SynCardia TAH, in 25-year-old grocery store clerk Michael Drummond who was suffering with severe heart failure due to cardiomyopathy and was awaiting a heart transplant. It was the first time this procedure was performed successfully as a temporary measure to buy time until a matching donor heart could be found. The previous TAH implants were temporary by Cooley (1969 and 1981) and Copeland (1985) had failed to result in survival for more than days and several were "permanent" TAH implants by William DeVries (Barney Clark in December 1982) that resulted in short term survival.

Prior to the first success, in March 1985, Copeland and his team had emergently implanted the unapproved Phoenix total artificial heart in a critically ill young man. The FDA policy of making exceptions for unapproved devices use in true emergencies followed this case. The Michael Drummond case followed in August 1985. Worsening of Drummond's condition created a desperation for action and the decision to use a TAH. It allowed time to find a matching donor heart. He survived more than five years, having received his heart transplant within two weeks of the implant. His cause of death was lymphoma.

Copeland, along with Don B. Olsen, was instrumental in forming CardioWest Technologies and continuing the research and development of TAH technology and its role in bridging-to-heart transplant. Following FDA approval to trial the CardioWest TAH, he published his ten-year trial (1993–2002), assessing the performance of the TAH in just less than 100 people with class IV biventricular heart failure and at risk of imminent death. All included in the trial were eligible for transplant but were waiting for donors. The trial demonstrated better clinical outcomes when the TAH was used to bridge-to-transplant. In 2001, he co-founded SynCardia Systems which acquired CardioWest Technologies. In 2004, the SynCardia heart was granted FDA approval for use as a bridge-to-transplant. It is the only TAH to obtain FDA approval and be commercially available.

=== Other cardiac surgery ===
In 2000, he performed America's first implant of a paediatric ventricular assist device. In 2010, he and his team also reported their results of using LVADs in infants and children with severe heart failure from dilated cardiomyopathy.

Other procedures he has led include heart valve surgery, cardiac bypass surgery in adults and the repair of congenital heart defects in infants.

== Later career ==
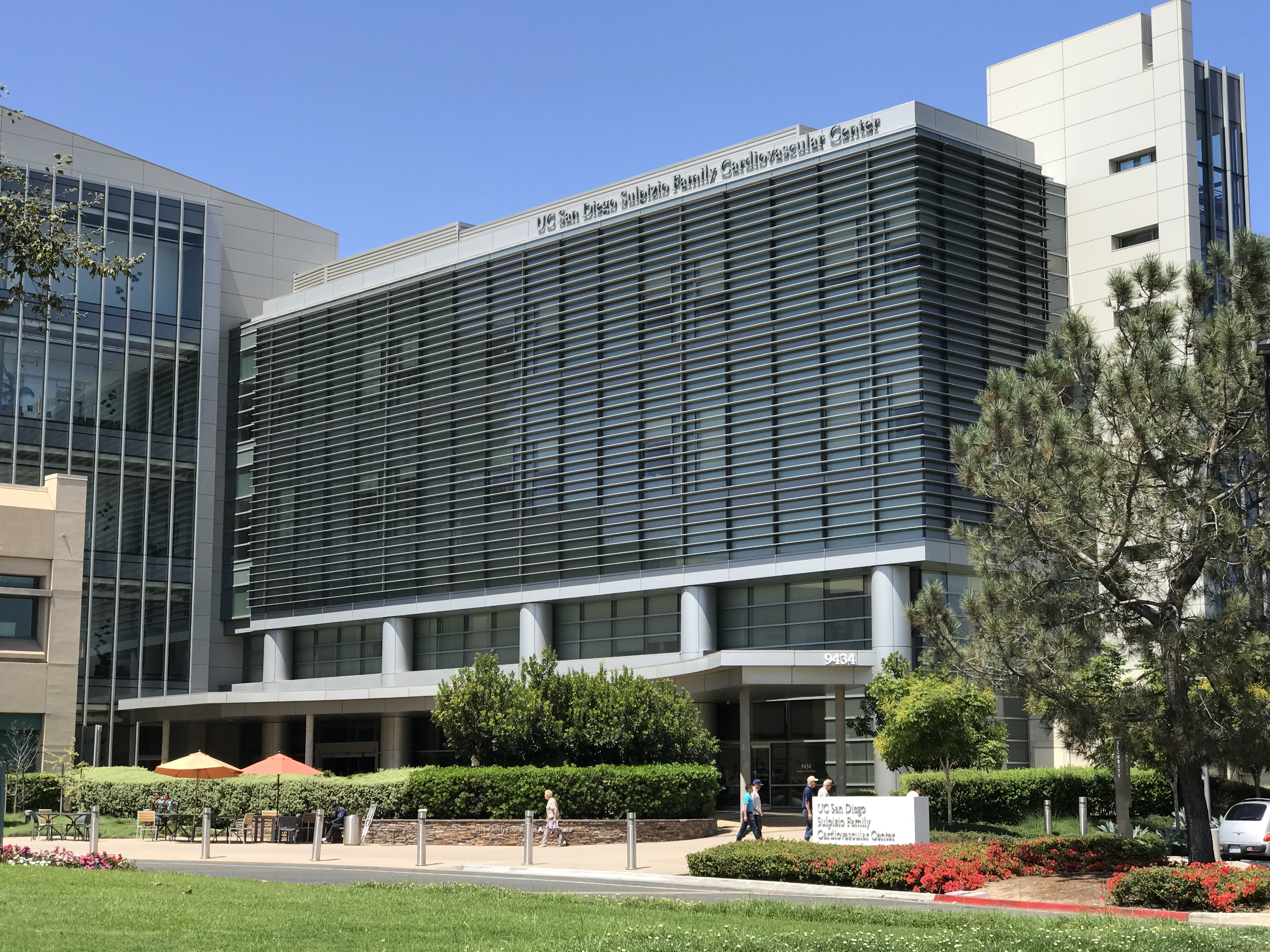
Sulpizio Cardiovascular Center

He resigned from the University of Arizona in 2010 after heading its Cardiovascular and Thoracic Surgery Section for over thirty years and subsequently moved to San Diego, where his wife was completing her general surgery training. Here, he joined the faculty at the new Sulpizio Family Cardiovascular Center at the University of California, San Diego.

=== First FDA approved total artificial heart ===
On 7 January 2011, during a four-hour operation, Copeland was part of the team that implanted, as a bridge-to-transplant, the world's only FDA-approved total artificial heart (TAH) for temporary use.

=== Heterotopic heart transplant at California ===
On 13 February 2011, Copeland and his team at the UC San Diego Center for Transplantation, performed the rare "piggyback" heart operation again, resulting in a man having two beating hearts in his chest. Termed a heterotopic heart transplantation, recipient Smith received a donor heart while still keeping his own diseased heart. The alternative option, which would have required two operations, was to offer a Left ventricular assist device (LVAD) as a bridge-to-transplantation.

The procedure involved placing the new donor heart on the right side of Smith's own heart and then surgically joining the left atria of both hearts to each other to allow oxygenated blood to flow direct from Smith's heart to the donor heart. The new heart's better functioning left ventricle then pumped blood into the aorta. The patient's own right heart continued to pump blood through the lungs.

== Awards and honours ==
Copeland was one of the co-founders of the International Society of Heart and Lung Transplantation (ISHLT) in 1981. In addition, he served as one of the society's first presidents.

In acknowledgment of his achievements with artificial hearts and heart-assist devices, he received the 2001 Barney Clark Award.

In 2013, he received the ISHLT Past Pioneer Award.

== Family ==
Copeland is married to Hannah Copeland a cardiac surgeon and has four children.

== Selected publications ==
He has authored over 400 articles and presented nationally and internationally.

- Copeland, JG; Jones, M; Spragg, R; Stinson, EB (1973). "In vitro preservation of canine hearts for 24 to 28 hours followed by successful orthotopic transplantation". Ann Surg. 178 (6): 687–92. doi:10.1097/00000658-197312000-00002. PMC 1355830. PMID 4586264..
- Copeland, JG; Griepp, RB; Bieber, CP; Billingham, M; Schroeder, JS; Hunt, S; Mason, J; Stinson, EB; Shumway, NE (1977). "Successful retransplantation of the human heart". J Thorac Cardiovasc Surg. 73 (2): 242–7. doi:10.1016/s0022-5223(19)39953-2. PMID 319302..
- Copeland, Jack G. (1988). "Cardiac transplantation". Current Problems in Surgery. 25 (9): 613–672. doi:10.1016/0011-3840(88)90007-X. PMID 3053053..
- Goldman, S; Copeland, J; Moritz, T; Henderson, W; Zadina, K; Ovitt, T; Doherty, J; Read, R; Chesler, E; Sako, Y (1988). "Improvement in early saphenous vein graft patency after coronary artery bypass surgery with antiplatelet therapy: results of a Veterans Administration Cooperative Study". Circulation. 77 (6): 1324–32. doi:10.1161/01.cir.77.6.1324. PMID 3286040..
- Copeland, JG (1993). "Transplantation: a team approach. The chaplain's role: a cardiac surgeon's view". J Health Care Chaplain. 5 (1–2): 5–10. doi:10.1300/J080v05n01_02. PMID 10171706..
- Copeland, JG (1995). "Only optimal donors should be accepted for heart transplantation: protagonist". J Heart Lung Transplant. 14 (6 Pt 1): 1038–42. PMID 8719447..
- Copeland, Jack G; Arabia, Francisco A; Smith, Richard G (2001). "Bridge to transplantation with a thoratec left ventricular assist device in a 17-kg child". The Annals of Thoracic Surgery. 71 (3): 1003–1004. doi:10.1016/S0003-4975(00)02268-2. PMID 11269409..
- Copeland, JG; Smith, RG; Arabia, FA; Nolan, PE; Sethi, GK; Tsau, PH; McClellan, D; Slepian, MJ (2004). "Cardiac replacement with a total artificial heart as a bridge to transplantation". N Engl J Med. 351 (9): 859–67. doi:10.1056/NEJMoa040186. PMID 15329423..
- Zimmerman, H; Covington, D; Smith, R; Copeland, J (2010). "Mechanical support and medical therapy reverse heart failure in infants and children". Artificial Organs. 34 (11): 885–90. doi:10.1111/j.1525-1594.2010.01069.x. PMID 20636444..
- Zimmerman, H; Covington, D; Smith, R; Copeland, J (2010). "Mechanical support and medical therapy reverse heart failure in infants and children". Artificial Organs. 34 (11): 885–90. doi:10.1111/j.1525-1594.2010.01069.x. PMID 20636444..
- Copeland, JG (2013). "SynCardia Total Artificial Heart: update and future". Tex Heart Inst J. 40 (5): 587–8. PMC 3853833. PMID 24391330..
