= SynCardia Systems =

Artificial heart manufacturer

SynCardia Systems LLC
- Formerly: CardioWest
- Company type: Private Subsidiary of Picard Medical Company
- Industry: Cardiac Medical Devices
- Founded: 2001
- Headquarters: Tucson, Arizona, USA
- Key people: Patrick Schnegelsberg CEO
- Products: Artificial hearts
- Number of employees: +80
- Website: syncardia.com

SynCardia Systems, LLC, headquartered in Tucson, Arizona, was founded in 2001 and is the sole manufacturer and provider of the world's only clinically proven and commercially approved Total Artificial Heart.

The SynCardia temporary Total Artificial Heart (TAH) has been in clinical use for more than 35 years.

== History ==
SynCardia was founded in 2001 by cardiothoracic surgeon Jack G. Copeland, MD; biomedical engineer Richard G. Smith, MSEE, CCE; and interventional cardiologist Marvin J. Slepian, MD; with Steven Langford BSEE, as General Manager. Today, SynCardia is a wholly owned subsidiary of Picard Medical and remains the sole manufacturer and provider of the world’s only commercially approved Total Artificial Heart. In clinical use for more than 35 years, the SynCardia temporary Total Artificial Heart (TAH-t) is the most widely used and extensively studied Total Artificial Heart in the world.

In 2004, the FDA approved the SynCardia TAH (formerly known as the "CardioWest temporary Total Artificial Heart”) as a bridge to donor heart transplant in cardiac transplant-eligible candidates at risk of imminent death from end-stage biventricular failure.

SynCardia's products include the original 70cc TAH; the newer, smaller 50cc TAH, designed to fit patients of smaller stature, including more women and adolescents; the Companion 2 (C2) Hospital Driver, which provides pneumatic power to the TAH from implant through patient recovery in the hospital; and the Freedom Portable Driver, a smaller, portable pneumatic pump for the TAH that allows stable patients who meet discharge criteria to enjoy life at home while they wait for a matching donor heart.

In addition to its being used as a bridge to transplant in the U.S., Canada and Europe, the 70cc TAH has supported several patients as a destination therapy in adult patients who are not eligible for transplant. The longest patient supported by the SynCardia Total Artificial Heart on a person who became not eligible for transplant was over 6 years and 9 months. He lived a near normal lifestyle at home with his wife. The smaller 50cc TAH is currently approved for use as a bridge to transplant for both pediatric and adult patients.

In September 2016, SynCardia was acquired by Versa Capital Management, LLC, a Philadelphia-based private equity investment firm and then was acquired by Piccard Medical in September 2021, which has provided additional financial and operational resources.

A documentary about the SynCardia TAH was released in 2016. Patrick Schnegelsberg was named CEO of SynCardia.

== See also ==
- Artificial heart
- Artificial heart valve
- Wayne Griffin
- Jack G. Copeland
