= Figurative =

Figurative may refer to:

- Figurative analogy, a comparison between things that are not alike but do share some common property
- Figurative art, representational artwork
- Literal and figurative language, a distinction within language analysis
- Neo-figurative art, an expressionist revival art movement
