= Roger Ford =

Roger Ford may refer to:

- Roger Ford (journalist)
- Roger Ford (production designer)
- Roger Ford (cricketer)
- Roger Ford (politician)

== See also ==
- Rodger Ford, American businessman
