= William F. Bernhard =

American physician

- Born: December 11, 1924; Brooklyn, New York, U.S.
- Died: October 29, 2018 (aged 93); Framingham, Massachusetts, U.S.
- Education: Williams College, Syracuse University Medical School
- Known for: first successful implant of left ventricular assist device
- Medical career
- Profession: Surgeon
- Field: Cardiovascular Surgery
- Institutions: Boston Children's Hospital
- Sub-specialties: Thoracic Cardiovascular Surgery
- Research: Left Ventricular Assist Device

William F. Bernhard (December 11, 1924 – October 29, 2018) was an American cardiovascular surgeon, Emeritus Professor of Surgery at Harvard Medical School, and cardiovascular surgical pioneer.

Bernhard's cardiovascular work first came to public light with his 1963 breakthrough hyperbaric chamber work and use of the chamber to try to save Patrick Bouvier Kennedy, son of U.S. President John F. Kennedy. Bernhard continued cardiovascular research at Boston Children's Hospital and developed innovative surgical alternatives for cardiovascular disease including the Ventricular Assist Device.

== Biography ==
Bernhard was born in Brooklyn, New York raised in Great Neck, New York, son of William Bernhard and Helen (Conroy) Bernhard. During World War II, after finishing college at Williams College in three years he served in the United States Navy as an ensign in the U.S. Naval Reserve. He completed his medical training at Syracuse University Medical School, and after several thoracic and surgical residencies at Bellevue Hospital and New York-Presbyterian Hospital (formerly Columbia-Presbyterian Hospital) in New York Bernhard began his work at Boston Children’s Hospital with heart surgeon Robert E. Gross, MD and in the early 1960s facilitated his deep interest in cardiovascular research by forming Boston Children’s Hospital Cardiovascular Research Laboratory. Bernhard is a Professor of Surgery, Emeritus at Harvard Medical School, and conducted many of his breakthrough surgeries for implantation of the Left Ventricular Assist Device (LVAD) in other Harvard affiliated hospitals. During his career Bernhard also served as an attending surgeon thoracic cardiovascular surgery at the VA Hospital, West Roxbury and a consultant in cardiothoracic surgery at Beth Israel Hospital, Boston, 1986.

== Professional work ==
In the mid to late 1970s numerous cardiovascular programs were competing to find a way to extend life for those with inoperable end-stage cardiovascular disease. Bernhard began his breakthrough work at Boston Children's Hospital as one of the principal clinical investigators of the development of temporary heart assist devices. His work changed the development of research into heart assist devices when the Nation Heart Lung and Blood Institute was preparing to cancel all related research. At an American Heart Association meeting in November 1978 he announced that two people had survived for several days with the left ventricular heart assist device Ventricular Assist Device before being weaned off the device. In 1987, after ten years of continued work, Bernhard went on to work to develop a left ventricular heart pump, manufactured by Thermedics, Inc. of Woburn, MA an affiliated company of Thermo Electron Corporation with funding by the National, Heart Lung, and Blood Institute, part of the National Institutes of Health. This research opened pathways to survival for severely ill cardiovascular patients. The early part of Bernhard's career was spent in surgical service to children with severe heart disorders. Bernhard performed most of his surgery at Children’s Hospital in Boston where he treated children and adolescents from 1960 until his retirement. Bernhard’s work included the development of ground breaking surgical techniques for the heart and the first successfully implanted LVAD device (see Ventricular Assist Device) manufactured while working with a group of scientists from Thermedics, Inc. of Woburn, MA.

Bernhard's work is documented in over 50 articles in the New England Journal of Medicine and the Journal of Thoracic and Cardiovascular Surgery as well as investigative television programs including CBS’ 60 Minutes and PBS’ Nova NOVA Investigates the risks, costs and controversies surrounding the development of the artificial heart - first broadcast on PBS in Season 11, Episode 2, on October 18, 1983 Over the course of his career, his open heart surgery on infants utilizing the hyperbaric chamber received worldwide attention in Time magazine August 16, 1963, Pediatrics: An Infant’s Cause of Death: Hyaline Membrane Disease. The development of the first successful LVAD prototype device developed with Thermedics was named “Heartmate” and the Heartmate II, manufactured by a successor company Thoratec, was implanted into Vice President Dick Cheney in July 2010

During the 1980s he continued research and clinical trials on an air driven left ventricular assist device and the pneumatic implantable device which became the Heartmate device for end-stage heart failure. This was one of many individual component studies that went into the development of a heart pump. Bernhard and his staff worked to complete long term clinical trial studies and eventually a subsidiary company of Thermedic’s, Thermo Cardiosystems merged with Thoratec Laboratories Corporation (Nasdaq: THOR), and obtained FDA approval in 2002 of the “Heartmate” LVAD device Thoratec Heartmate II LVAD device is used in implantation today, and was implanted in Dick Cheney in July 2010 before his heart transplant in March 2012. He died on October 29, 2018, at the age of 93.
