= LVAC =

LVAC may refer to:

- List Visual Arts Center, a contemporary art gallery at the Massachusetts Institute of Technology
- Ventricular assist device, a medical device
