= Bridge therapy =

Therapy intended to serve as a figurative bridge to another stage of therapy

Bridge therapy is therapy intended, in transportation metaphor, to serve as a figurative bridge to another stage of therapy or health, helping a patient pass a challenging period caused by particular severe illness. There are various types of bridge therapy, such as bridge to transplant, bridge to candidacy, bridge to decision, bridge to recovery, and anticoagulation bridge (such as heparin bridge). Bridge therapy exists in contrast to destination therapy, which is the figurative destination rather than a bridge to something else.

- Bridge to transplant: Such therapy can provide an opportunity for optimization of their clinical condition to successfully reach organ transplant, still being eligible for transplant after spending time waiting for an organ to become available. In patients with decompensated end-stage heart failure it can provide hemodynamic stabilization and potential end-organ function recovery allowing "bridging" to transplantation. For example, a left ventricular assist device (LVAD) often serves as a bridge to heart transplant, locoregional therapy (such as radiofrequency ablation) for hepatocellular carcinoma can serve as a bridge to liver transplant, and extracorporeal membrane oxygenation (ECMO) or lung volume reduction surgery (LVRS) can serve as a bridge to lung transplant.
- Bridge to candidacy: A patient was too critically ill to be a candidate for a certain therapy or transplantation, but the bridge therapy can carry them to a state of being eligible for transplantation; for example, ECMO as a bridge to nontransplant cardiac surgery.
- Bridge to decision: A decision will soon be made about what to do next (that is, which definitive therapy will come soon), but first the patient needs a bridge to support them until that decision; for example, short-term mechanical circulatory support as a bridge to durable left ventricular assist device implant in refractory cardiogenic shock.
- Bridge to recovery: A recovery is likely, but first support is needed to carry someone through a tough time; for example, ECMO in methamphetamine toxicity, which can be viewed as both rescue therapy and bridge to recovery.
- Anticoagulation bridge: Temporary anticoagulation, such as with heparin, is used during a perioperative period when a patient's regular anticoagulant therapy, such as with warfarin, is suspended; the goal is to prevent excess risk of severe bleeding during or after surgery. The heparin bridge provides some anticoagulant effect (to prevent thrombosis from warfarin withdrawal) but not as much as would make severe bleeding likely.

A related concept is linkage to care, which is a bridge to therapy, such as when community screening events (for conditions such as high blood pressure or high blood sugar) find new cases of hypertension or diabetes; recipients are helped to find appropriate care (for example, some have not been to a doctor for many years and can use help finding a new doctor).
