= Tom Burnett (Flight 93 passenger) =

American executive and United 93 passenger (1963–2001)

- Undated photograph of Burnett
- Born: Thomas Edward Burnett Jr. May 29, 1963; Bloomington, Minnesota, U.S.
- Died: September 11, 2001 (aged 38); Stonycreek Township, Pennsylvania, U.S.
- Cause of death: Plane crash during the September 11 attacks
- Resting place: Fort Snelling National Cemetery
- Education: University of Minnesota (BS); Pepperdine University (MBA)
- Employer: Thoratec Corporation
- Known for: Leading revolt on United 93 in the September 11 attacks
- Spouse: Deena Burchfield (m. 1992)
- Children: 4

Thomas Edward Burnett Jr. (May 29, 1963 – September 11, 2001) was an American business executive who was the vice-president and chief operating officer of Thoratec Corporation, a medical devices company based in Pleasanton, California; he resided in nearby San Ramon, California. On September 11, 2001, Burnett was a passenger on board United Airlines Flight 93, which was hijacked by al-Qaeda terrorists as part of the September 11 attacks. He, along with other passengers, formed the plan to retake the plane from the hijackers, and led the effort that resulted in the crash of the plane into a field in Stonycreek Township near Shanksville, Pennsylvania, thwarting the plan of the hijackers to crash the plane into a building in Washington, D.C., most likely either the U.S. Capitol Building or the White House.

== Early life ==
Thomas Edward Burnett Jr. was born on May 29, 1963, the son of Thomas Burnett Sr. and Beverly Burnett. Burnett and his sisters grew up in Bloomington, Minnesota. He attended Ridgeview Elementary School, then Olson Middle School. At Thomas Jefferson Senior High School, where he wore jersey No. 11 and then No. 10, he led the Jaguars to the state finals as their starting quarterback in 1980. He graduated in 1981.

Burnett studied Economics at Saint John's University in Minnesota, where he was a quarterback on the football team. After two years, an injury shortened his football career and he transferred to the Carlson School of Management at the University of Minnesota. He was named president of the Alpha Kappa Psi fraternity, then later graduated with a Bachelor of Science degree in Finance. He went on to earn a Master of Business Administration degree at Pepperdine University.

== Career ==
In 1996, Burnett joined Thoratec Corporation, a medical devices company, as vice president of sales and marketing. In November 1999, he was promoted to senior vice president and chief operating officer.

== Personal life ==
In 1985, Burnett and a female classmate became the biological parents to a daughter who was given up for adoption. Her name is Mariah Mills Jacobsen. In July 1989, Burnett met his future wife, Deena, in Atlanta, where she had just completed flight attendant training for Delta Air Lines. They married in April 1992 and had three daughters. The family lived in San Ramon, California, where Deena worked as a stay-at-home mother, beginning when she first became pregnant in 1995. Thomas Burnett had attended Mass daily in the year prior to the September 11 attacks, attempting to address a sense of foreboding which he had expressed to his wife. Burnett had busts of Thomas Jefferson, Abraham Lincoln, Theodore Roosevelt, and Winston Churchill in his office. In January 2004, Jacobsen obtained a copy of her birth certificate, and learned that Burnett was her father. She met Burnett's family, becoming close to his sisters, his widow Deena, and her three half-sisters.

== United Airlines Flight 93 ==
The plaque that rests beneath the memorial flag dedicated to Burnett in Bloomington, Minnesota

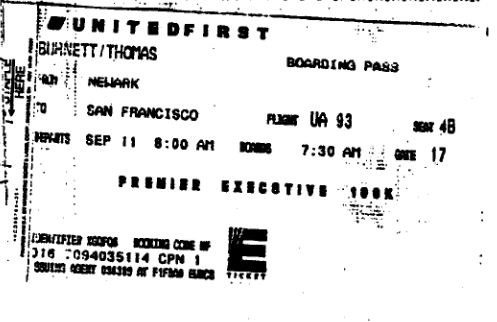
Tom Burnett's boarding pass for Flight 93

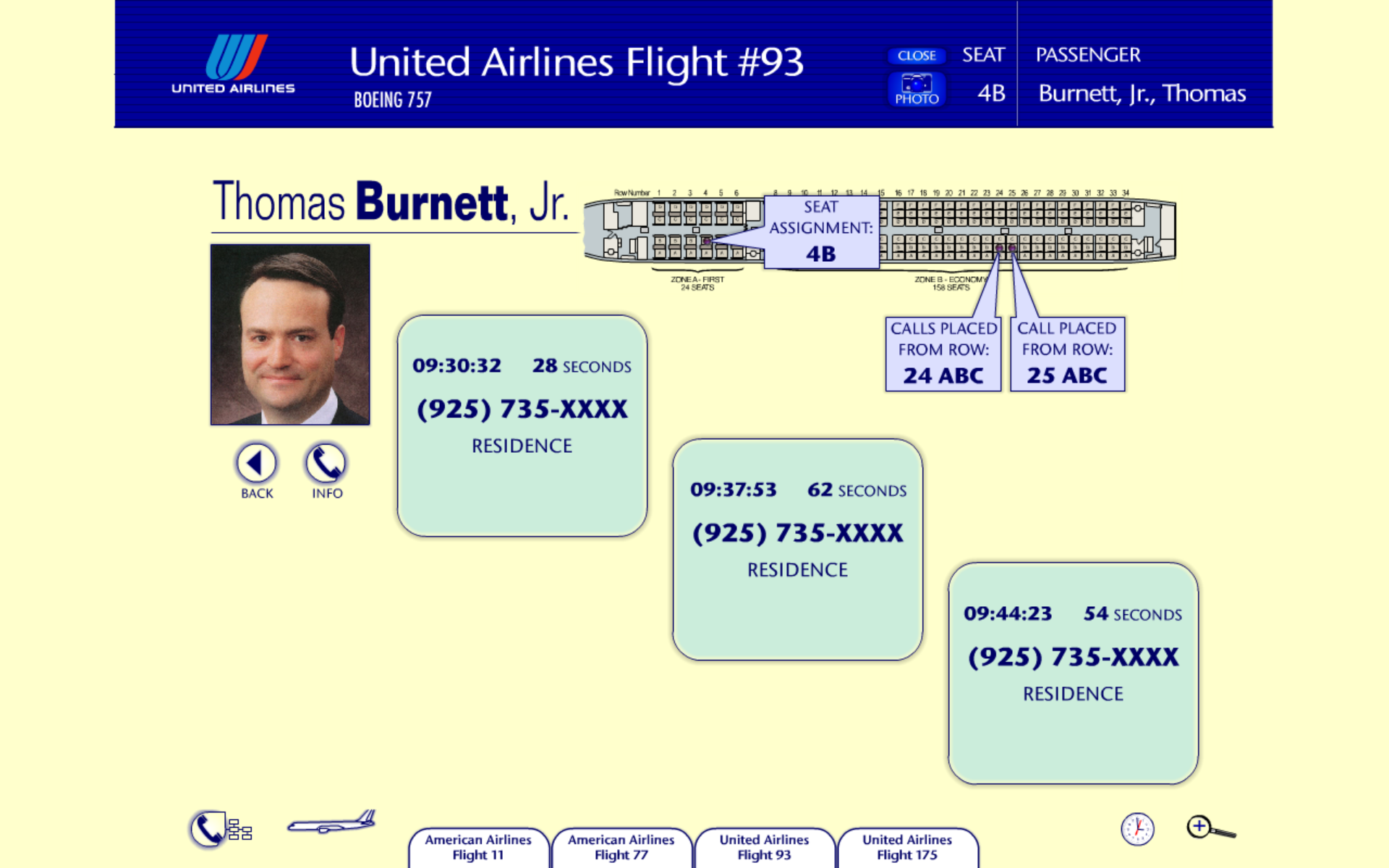
Phone call details

On September 11, 2001, Burnett boarded United Airlines Flight 93, returning home to San Ramon, after a business trip. Burnett sat next to passenger Mark Bingham. Burnett called his wife, Deena, after hijackers took control of the plane. He made several phone calls to her beginning at 09:30:32 from rows 24 and 25, though he was assigned a seat in row four. Burnett explained that the plane had been hijacked by men claiming to have a bomb, and also said that a passenger had been stabbed with a knife and that he believed the bomb threat was a ruse to control the passengers. During his second call to her, she told him about the attacks on the World Trade Center and he replied that the hijackers were "talking about crashing this plane...Oh my God. It's a suicide mission." He began pumping her for information about the attacks, interrupting her from time to time to tell the others nearby what she was saying. Then he hung up. Upon learning of the situation, Deena, a former flight attendant, recalled her training and urged Burnett to sit quietly and not draw attention to himself. However, Burnett instead informed her that he, Mark Bingham, Todd Beamer, and Jeremy Glick were forming a plan to take the plane from the hijackers, and leading other passengers in this effort. He ended his last call by saying, "Don't worry, we're going to do something." Burnett and several other passengers stormed the cockpit, foiling the hijackers' plan to crash the plane into the White House or the U.S. Capitol Building. To prevent the passengers from gaining control of the plane, the hijackers crashed it in a Pennsylvania field, killing all 44 people on board.

== Legacy ==
Burnett memorial flag in Bloomington, Minnesota

Burnett is buried at Fort Snelling National Cemetery in Minnesota. Funeral and burial services were held on May 24, 2002.

On September 14, 2001, the Jefferson High School football team wore on their helmets the number 10, in honor of Burnett, who wore that number when he played at Jefferson High.

In March 2002, Bradley Street, a small street in Pleasanton, California, that runs outside the headquarters of Thoratec Corp. where Burnett worked, was renamed Tom Burnett Lane.

On September 11, 2002, the Mall of America in Bloomington, Minnesota, dedicated the Tom Burnett 9/11 Memorial near the Nordstrom Court, with the loved ones of Burnett in attendance.

In 2002, Burnett, along with Beamer, Bingham and Glick, were posthumously awarded the Arthur Ashe Courage Award.

A post office in his hometown of Bloomington, Minnesota, was renamed the Thomas E. Burnett Jr. Post Office.

Every May, Oak Grove Middle School students volunteer for a Thomas Burnett Day of Service. At Jefferson High School, Burnett's former teammates created a memorial to honor him situated between two football practice fields. The school's hallways display photos of Burnett and his jersey, which was retired on September 5, 2002, at Bloomington Arena during the game between Bloomington Jefferson and their rival, Bloomington Kennedy. A memorial scholarship was started in his honor, and a collection of his favorite books was placed in the school's media center. A white oak tree was planted in front of Saint Edward's Catholic Church in Bloomington, where Burnett was confirmed, and where his funeral was held. A large fieldstone in front of the tree is inscribed with the passage from the Book of John 15:13: "There is no greater love than to lay down one's life for one's friends".

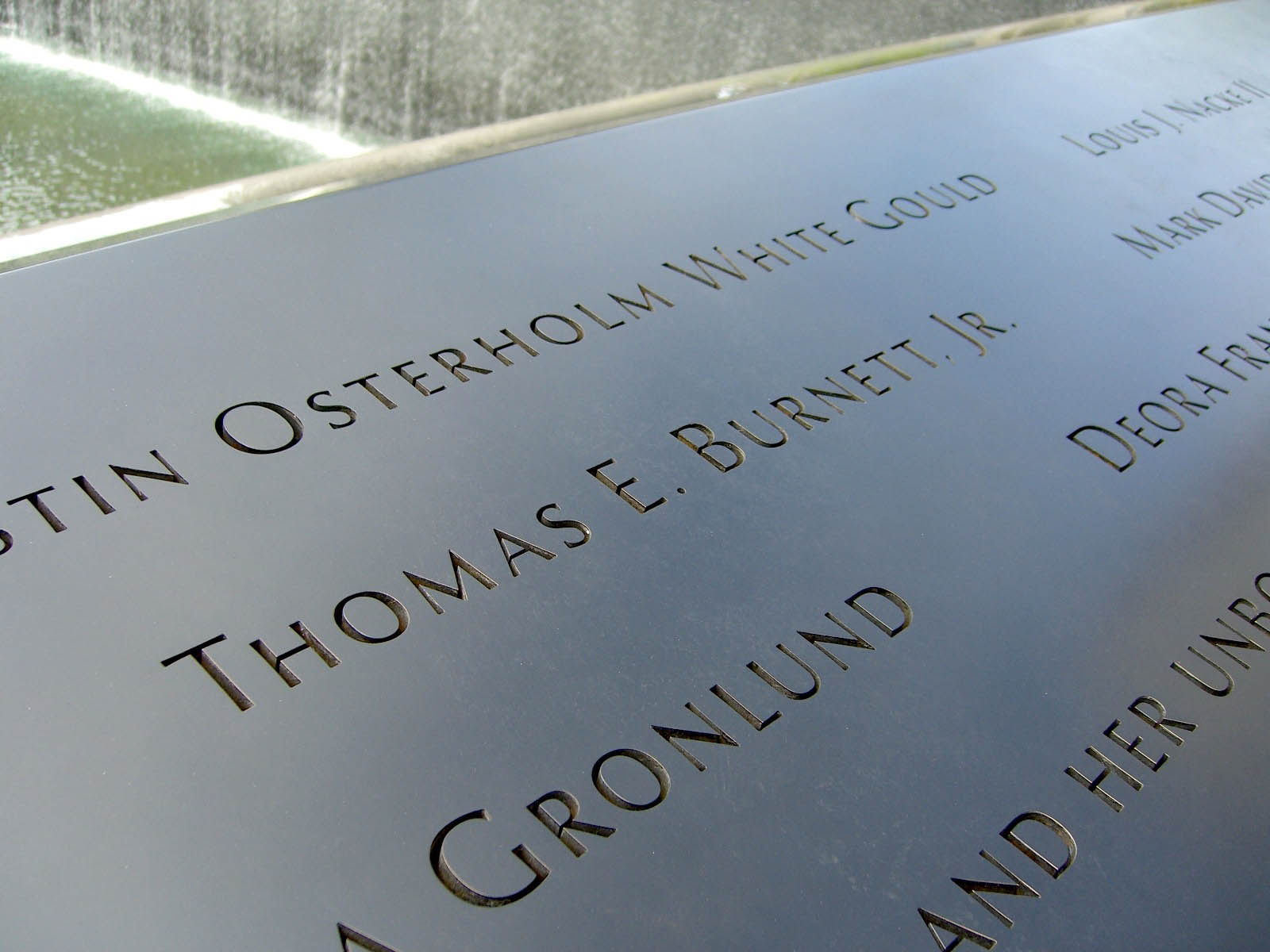
Burnett's name is located on Panel S-68 of the National September 11 Memorial & Museum's South Pool, along with those of other passengers of Flight 93.

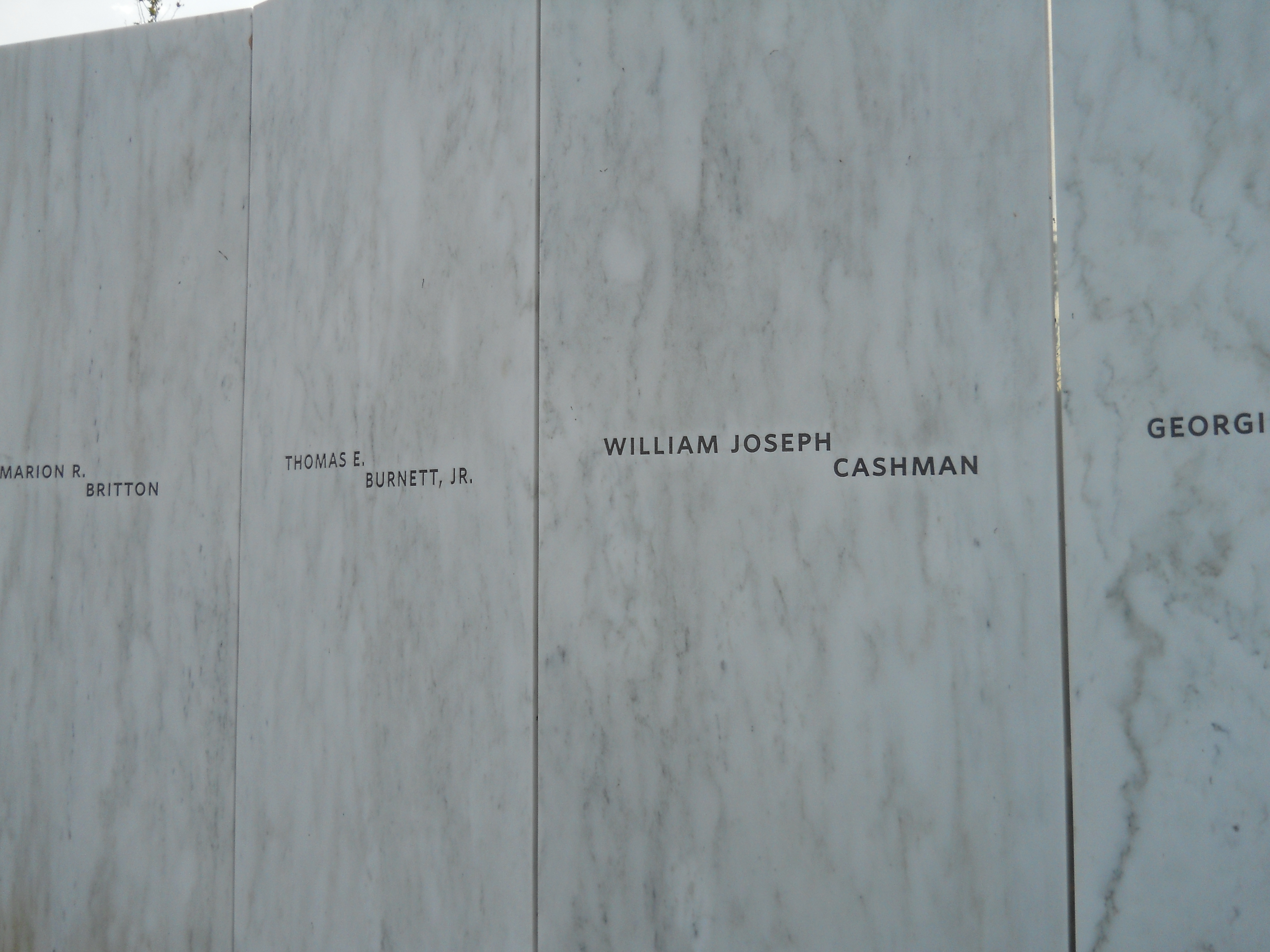
Burnett and other names on the Flight 93 National Memorial

In 2004, Burnett's biological daughter Mariah Mills turned 19 and became legally entitled to access information about her birth parents. She learned that Burnett was her father, and she eventually formed a relationship with Deena Burnett and with her half-sisters. Deena gave Mills an unfinished letter that Burnett had written for her in 1987.

The University of Minnesota founded the Tom Burnett Advanced Leadership Program in 2006. Each year a group of final-year students work as a group on skills relating to courageous leadership and active citizenship. Over 200 students have matriculated through the program.

In 2008, Thoratec Europe Limited (Thoratec Corporation's European distribution arm based in Great Britain) gave its new UK headquarters in Huntingdon, Cambridgeshire, the name Burnett House.

In mid-2002, Deena Burnett and her daughters moved from San Ramon back to Little Rock, Arkansas, near where she grew up and where her family still lives. In 2006, Deena married Rodney Bailey, a divorced Little Rock insurance agent with a teenage son, that she met in early 2004. She co-authored a book with Anthony Giombetti entitled Fighting Back: Living Life Beyond Ourselves. The book is published by Advantage Inspirational and was released in July 2006. Fighting Back recounts the difficulties in getting the FBI to release cockpit voice recorder tapes from United 93 to the public, and includes Deena's thoughts on the nature of heroism.

In February 2003, the California State Assembly renamed the Fostoria Way overcrossing over Interstate 680 in San Ramon the Thomas E. Burnett Jr. Memorial Bridge in his honor.

At the National 9/11 Memorial at the World Trade Center, Burnett is memorialized at the South Pool, on Panel S-68, along with other passengers from Flight 93.

On September 1, 2011, his widow Deena Burnett was interviewed on the death of Osama bin Laden where she said that his death had given her closure. She learned of the news while in bed and told her daughters the next morning. His mother, Beverly Burnett thanked and praised the Navy SEALs and echoed Deena's words of having more closure after bin Laden's killing.

On September 11, 2011, the tenth anniversary of the attacks, the Bloomington Crime Prevention Association sponsored the first annual Tom Burnett Jr. Hometown Heroes Celebration at the Hilton Mall of America. The event featured a keynote address given by Senator Amy Klobuchar, and the presentation of the Tom Burnett Jr. Remember Award would be given to citizens who demonstrate leadership, selflessness, and a commitment to others. James Caauwe, President of the Association, explained the event thus: "We wanted to remember Tom Burnett Jr. and the sacrifices he made, but not only the sacrifices that he made on 9/11 but who he was as a person. We looked at those qualities that he had of leadership and of community service and recognized people that are doing that today." The occasion was also marked with the dedication of Hero's Garden, a memorial that stands in Burnett's honor at Pepperdine University's Graziadio School of Business and Management, where Burnett received his MBA.

== In popular culture ==
Burnett is portrayed by American actors Greg Benson in the documentary The Flight That Fought Back, by Jeffrey Nordling in the 2006 film Flight 93, and by Christian Clemenson in the 2006 feature film United 93.
