= AlphaGraphics =

American print shop franchise chain

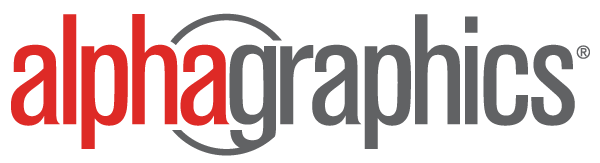
- Company type: Private
- Industry: Printing Franchising
- Founded: 1920
- Headquarters: Denver, Colorado, US
- Key people: Paolo Fiorelli (CEO); Ryan Farris (President)
- Website: www.alphagraphics.com

AlphaGraphics is a franchised chain of more than 810 independently owned and operated marketing service providers with full-service print shops.

AlphaGraphics business centers are franchised by AlphaGraphics, Inc., part of the Fortidia group of companies.

== History ==
AlphaGraphics was founded by Rodger Ford in Tucson, Arizona, in 1969, and began franchising in 1979.

In 1985, the company became the first desktop publishing retailer. By the late 1980s, AlphaGraphics became the first U.S.-based printing franchise to expand internationally.

The company was purchased by the Pindar Group in 2001 and moved its headquarters to Salt Lake City, Utah. As of August 15, 2014, Art Coley stepped down as President. Gay Burke became Interim President and Executive Chairman of the Board. After Pindar Group entered administration in the United Kingdom in 2011, the company was sold in 2014 to Western Capital Resources Inc.; since 2010, Blackstreet Capital has held a controlling interest in Western Capital Resources Inc.

In October 2017, Fortidia acquired AlphaGraphics from Western Capital Resources.

As of November 2018, the company has moved their corporate headquarters to Denver, Colorado.

Today, the AlphaGraphics network is composed of more than 270 owner-operated business centers in the United States, Brazil, China, Hong Kong, Saudi Arabia, and the United Kingdom. Franchisees employee approximately 3,900 employees worldwide, while AlphaGraphics, Inc., the corporate franchisor, employs approximately 45.

According to FranchiseGator.com, purchasing an AlphaGraphics franchise requires a total investment of between $240K and $375K. Financial assistance, training, and support are available.

== Recognition ==
In August 2018, AlphaGraphics was ranked 60th in the Printing News' Top 100 Quick and Small Commercial Printers list.

In December 2019, AlphaGraphics was recognized by Franchise Business Review for exceptionally high franchisee satisfaction ratings.
