= ReliantHeart Inc. =

American medical equipment company

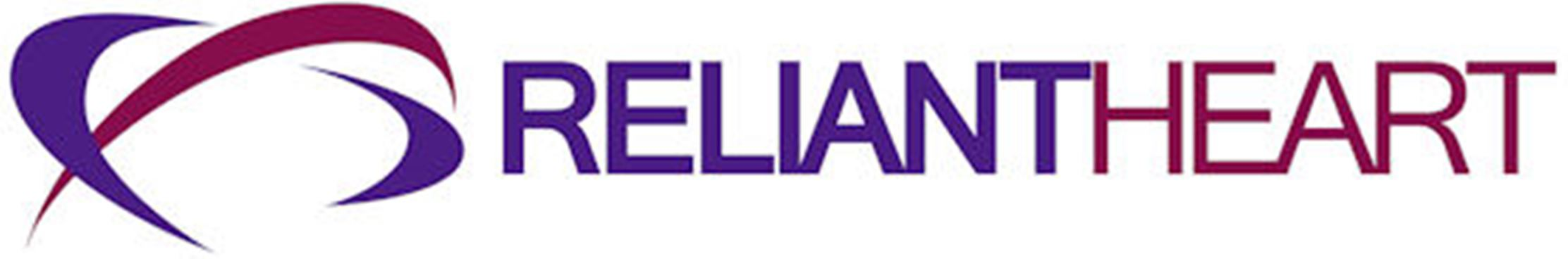
- Company type: Private
- Industry: Medical Devices
- Founded: August 2013; 12 years ago in Houston, Texas, United States
- Headquarters: Houston, Texas
- Key people: Sailesh Saxena; Bryan E. Lynch; Anthony Williams; Cindy McKelroy; Rob Petterson; Jennifer Michael
- Website: reliantheart.com

ReliantHeart, Inc. is a privately held American company headquartered in Houston, Texas that designs, manufactures, and provides remote monitoring capabilities for its left ventricular assist devices (LVAD, or VAD) which are used to assist circulation for failing hearts.

== History ==
The original VAD was developed by David Saucier, a heart transplant patient who worked at NASA, and surgeon Michael DeBakey. Dallas W. Anderson, who founded MicroMed Technology Inc. in 1995, was granted exclusive rights to the NASA/DeBakey VAD in 1996. MicroMed Cardiovascular, Inc. filed for Chapter 11 bankruptcy in June 2013, and former members of the company founded ReliantHeart Inc. in August 2013. ReliantHeart became successor-in-interest to the assets of MicroMed Cardiovascular, Inc., including the HeartAssist5 VAD. In August 2014, ReliantHeart purchased 50% of INRTracker, an online tool for patients taking Warfarin and reporting of INR.

== Products ==
The HeartAssist5 is a modern version of the DeBakey VAD and as of December 2014 was the only remotely monitored medical device in the world. It was first approved for use in Europe in 2009 under MicroMed Cardiovascular, Inc. The HeartAssist5 is in use in Europe as a destination therapy by patients who are not candidates to receive heart transplants and as a bridge to transplant for those who are.

The HeartAssist5 is an axial flow pump and the smallest of the full-flow LVADs. Its pump is slightly larger in diameter than a U.S. quarter or one-Euro coin and weighs only 3.2 ounces (92 grams). The small size allows for the device to be implanted adjacent to the heart and above the diaphragm; this is unique among LVADs.

The aVAD is an intraventricular implant. It has the same blood path as the HeartAssist5 but also has active magnetic stabilization, is smaller than the HeartAssist5, and operates with more efficiency and power. The aVAD was approved for use in Europe in August 2016, and implantations were expected to begin as early as that September.

== Regulatory approval ==
CE Mark – The aVAD and the HeartAssist5 VAD are CE Mark-approved in Europe for use in patients requiring ventricular support due to end stage heart failure.
IDE clinical trial – ReliantHeart Inc. was granted approval from the FDA to conduct an Investigational Device Exemption (IDE) Clinical Trial on the HeartAssist5® Ventricular Assist Device System for patients awaiting cardiac transplant. The study began in September 2014. The University of Chicago Medicine implanted the HeartAssist5 into the first patient in the United States in March 2015.

== Innovation ==
True Flow Measurement The Flow Probe in the aVAD and HeartAssist5 is a tool to observe interaction between the device and the ventricle. This allows for clinicians to confirm that the aortic valve is opening as the ventricle is pressurized. The measurement is unaffected by changes in blood or fibrin deposition, which eliminates the need for estimation.

Remote Monitoring is real time Machine to Machine (M2M) – devices communicating via data transmission and generating alerts based on the data transmitted. Through the HeartAssistRemote Monitoring System, patient data is relayed, using the Numerex Network, to a secured VADLink website that can be accessed by the clinical team and enables fast diagnosis regardless of patient location.

The HeartAssistRemote Monitoring System received a 2014 M2M Telehealth Award from M2M Evolution Magazine.

=== In development ===
- Liberty system, with wireless Transcutaneous Energy Transfer (TET): ReliantHeart is collaborating with Dualis MedTech, and others, to develop this fully implantable system. The Liberty system will be available for patients who already have a HeartAssist5 without exchanging the pump; this eliminates the possibility of driveline infection. The companies are creating the system step by step and have indicated that the configuration will be compatible with future products that are introduced.
