= Peter Houghton =

Longest surviving artificial heart transplant patient in the UK

- Born: 20 August 1938
- Died: 25 November 2007 (aged 69); Selly Oak Hospital, Birmingham, England
- Occupation: Psychotherapist
- Known for: Patient with a left ventricular assist device
- Spouse: Diane

Peter Houghton (20 August 1938 – 25 November 2007) was the longest surviving artificial heart transplant patient in the UK.

Houghton was implanted with a Jarvik 2000 heart pump at the John Radcliffe Hospital, Oxford, England, by professor Stephen Westaby, on 20 June 2000 owing to severe heart failure. After the operation, the left ventricular assist device worked continuously supporting his heart, breaking the previous world duration record on 11 August 2004 at 1,513 days.

The record represents the survival of both the person and the artificial heart. A few individuals have lived longer than 1,512 days but with two artificial hearts, having the first surgically replaced due to failure or wear.

Houghton was the first person in the world to be given an artificial heart for permanent use rather than as a bridge to transplantation.

An educated psychotherapist, Houghton has written a book, "The World Within Me," in which he contemplates how receiving the transplant challenges his devout Catholicism. He also reports that, ironically, the heart transplant has left him largely devoid of emotion.

He died on November 25, 2007, at Birmingham's Selly Oak Hospital at the age of 69. The cause of death was given as multiple organ failure.
