= Thoratec =

American medical device manufacturer

Thoratec Corporation
- Type: Subsidiary
- Industry: Medical devices
- Founded: California, U.S.(March 1, 1976)
- Headquarters: Pleasanton, California
- Area served: Global
- Key people: D. Keith Grossman; President and CEO Howard E. Chase; J. Daniel Cole; Neil F. Dimick; D. Keith Grossman; J. Donald Hill; William M. Hitchcock; George W. Holbrook Jr. Daniel M. Mulvena
- Products: mechanical circulatory support devices
- Number of employees: 1,048 (2014)
- Parent: Abbott Laboratories
- Website: Thoratec.com

Thoratec Corporation was a United States–based company that developed, manufactured, and marketed medical devices for mechanical circulatory support used in the treatment of heart-failure. Its products included ventricular assist devices (VADs), which were used to support patients with advanced heart failure.

For chronic circulatory support for late-stage heart-failure patients, Thoratec's primary product lines were its ventricular assist devices: the HeartMate 3 Left Ventricular Assist System (HeartMate 3), and the Thoratec Paracorporeal Ventricular Assist Device (PVAD). For acute circulatory support, the company's product lines were the CentriMag Acute Circulatory System (CentriMag); and for pediatric patients the PediMag Acute Circulatory System, known as PediVAS outside the U.S.

Incorporated in 1976, Thoratec was headquartered in Pleasanton, California. In 2015 the company was acquired by St. Jude Medical, a global medical-device company headquartered in Saint Paul, Minnesota. In January 2017, St. Jude was acquired by Abbott Laboratories.

== History ==
=== First decades ===
Thoratec was incorporated in California in 1976 as Thoratec Laboratories Corporation. It completed its initial public offering (IPO) of stock in 1981, trading under the ticker "THOR". The company's efforts were focused on developing devices for circulatory support and vascular graft applications. It developed bypass grafts, which are artificial coronary conduits used in heart surgeries; and eventually also ventricular assist devices (VADs), heart-pump devices for people suffering from congestive heart failure. VADs are used in patients too old or ill for a heart transplant, or to keep a patient alive until a heart becomes available for transplantation surgery.

In December 1995 Thoratec received FDA approval to sell its Thoratec Ventricular Assist Device System, an external blood pump with cannulae connecting the pump to the patient's heart and vessels. In 1996 this VADS was used in more than 750 patients, and Thoratec sold 285 of them in clinical trials for the FDA. Company revenues that year were $7.5 million.

In its early decades the company also developed Thoralon, a proprietary biocompatible material that minimizes blood clotting and inflammation. The material is currently used in the Thoratec PVAD pulsatile-flow biventricular device.

By 2000, the Thoratec VAD System was the only device approved by the FDA for left, right, or biventricular support for both providing a bridge until heart transplant and for recovery of the heart after open-heart surgery. To expand and diversify its product line and capabilities, in 2001 Thoratec acquired Thermo Cardiosystems, a rival company three times its size and the developer of the HeartMate VAD. This acquisition gave Thoratec dominance in the artificial heart market, and the company also shortened its name from Thoratec Laboratories Corporation to Thoratec Corporation.

In 2001, Thoratec's chief operating officer Tom Burnett was killed after United Airlines Flight 93 crashed in a field near Stonycreek Township, Somerset County, Pennsylvania after it was hijacked as part of the September 11 attacks. Burnett, along with passengers Mark Bingham, Todd Beamer, and Jeremy Glick, formed a plan to recapture the plane from the hijackers, and led the effort that resulted in the crash of the plane into the field, thwarting the hijackers' intended plan to crash the plane into a building in Washington, D.C.

=== HeartMate and other product lines ===
Thoratec PVAD

With the 2001 Thermo Cardiosystems merger, Thoratec acquired the HeartMate Left Ventricular Assist System, an implanted VAD for end-stage heart patients. A landmark three-year study of 129 patients at 22 major medical centers, called REMATCH (Randomized Evaluation of Mechanical Assistance for the Treatment of Congestive Heart Failure) and published in November 2001, found that the HeartMate VE (vented electric) more than doubled the likelihood that terminally ill heart-failure patients would be alive at the end of one year, and it increased the likelihood of survival for two years to 22.9% vs. 8.1% for patients who were treated with only medication.

By November 2002, the FDA approved the HeartMate VE both for patients awaiting a heart transplant (bridge to transplantation), and for patients too ill to be eligible for a heart transplant (destination therapy). Thoratec was the first company to gain approval of a VAD for permanent use in patients too ill for a heart transplant. The company introduced an enhanced version of the device, the HeartMate XVE, and it was FDA approved for destination therapy in May 2003, having previously been approved for bridge to transplantation. In June 2003 the HeartMate XVE received CE Mark approval allowing for its commercial sale in Europe, and in June 2004 it was approved in Canada.

The company's biventricular VAD, the paracorporeal (external) Thoratec PVAD, had been developed and approved in the 1990s for hospital use in the U.S. In December 2003, the FDA approved the TLC-II portable driver – the unit providing power, monitoring, and operational control for these VADs – for home discharge, making it the first biventricular support device approved for home discharge. This enabled patients to return home with the system to await heart transplantation or for their native heart to recover.

==== HeartMate II and later products ====
Thoratec next developed a second-generation LVAD product line, a continuous-flow VAD called HeartMate II. The new device, one-fifth the size of the HeartMate XVE, was designed to last more than twice as long as the XVE, providing mechanical circulatory support for three to five years or more before replacement. HeartMate II was CE Mark authorized for bridge to transplantation and for destination therapy in Europe in November 2005. It received FDA approval for bridge-to-transplantation (BTT) use in April 2008, and for destination therapy (DT) for those too old or ill for a heart transplant in January 2010. The company therefore discontinued its first-generation HeartMate XVE in 2011.

In July 2009, the Journal of the American College of Cardiology reported on 18-month follow-up data for the HeartMate II Pivotal Study, which showed improved survival, less frequent adverse events, and greater reliability with continuous-flow LVADs compared to pulsatile-flow devices. As of mid 2015, Thoratec has the only FDA-approved LVAD for destination therapy, or permanent support; the ventricular assist system by competitor HeartWare Inc. is still in clinical trials for destination therapy. In a two-year randomized controlled clinical trial published in 2009 comparing pulsatile and continuous-flow LVADs, survival rates at two years increased approximately six-fold for HeartMate II patients compared to actuarial survival rates for patients who receive only drug therapy. In the 2005–2007 and 2007–2009 HeartMate II destination-therapy trials, more than 80% of patients implanted with the HeartMate II improved to NYHA class I/II from NYHA class III/IV by six months after implantation, and this improvement remained stable for two years. The patients' six-minute walk distance improved to >340 meters by six months and was sustained through two years.

In January 2010 Thoratec acquired catheter-based heart pump technology from the Swedish medical-technology company Getinge. The technology is for use in a minimally invasive, acute cardiac axial-flow pump that can be delivered percutaneously in a cardiac catheterization lab or operating room.

In August 2011 Thoratec acquired the medical business of Levitronix. The acquisition included CentriMag, an extracorporeal centrifugal-flow blood pump used for short-term surgical support, and the PediMag, an acute pediatric surgical circulatory support system known as PediVAS outside the U.S. In July 2013, Thoratec acquired the DuraHeart II ventricular assist system from medical-equipment manufacturer Terumo. According to the press release, the device further differentiates Thoratec's approach to mechanical circulatory support, and is expected to begin in-human implantation in 2016 followed by clinical trials.

A study published in November 2013 by the New England Journal of Medicine reported an unexpected increase in blood clots (thrombosis) in the HeartMate II from March 2011 through January 2013 and thereafter, at three institutions. Another analysis at three other institutions including the Mayo Clinic reported a similar thrombosis increase with a peak in 2012; however thereafter the incidence decreased by 2013 to post-marketing (2007) levels. In March 2014 Thoratec issued a warning against improper use of the external controller for the HeartMate II.

==== HeartMate 3 introduced ====
Thoratec's third-generation HeartMate LVAD is the HeartMate 3, designed to lower adverse event rates through improved hemocompatibility, and to increase ease of surgical placement through new design and compact size. It began undergoing clinical trials in the U.S. and internationally in mid 2014.

In mid 2014, CE Mark trials also started for the Thoratec PHP (Percutaneous Heart Pump), an external catheter-based left ventricular pump for acute mechanical circulatory support, and the device received CE Mark approval in July 2015. In late 2015 the company initiated a clinical study exploring the use of the Thoratec PHP in patients undergoing high-risk percutaneous coronary intervention (PCI).

In July 2014, Thoratec acquired Apica Cardiovascular Limited. The Ireland-based company developed a number of implant systems and devices designed to enable transapical (through the apex of the heart) surgical access.

In July 2015, it was announced that Thoratec would be acquired by St. Jude Medical, a global medical-device company headquartered in Saint Paul, Minnesota. The acquisition was completed in October 2015.

== Major products ==
Thoratec's current major products include:

- HeartMate II. The HeartMate II is a continuous-flow left ventricular assist device (LVAD) implanted alongside a patient's native heart with the purpose of pumping for the heart's left ventricle. It is surgically implanted just below the diaphragm in the abdomen and attached to the aorta, leaving natural circulation in place as it assists in providing energy to propel blood throughout the body as a healthy left ventricle would. It is designed to have a longer functional life than the previous generation of devices and to operate more quietly. Patients with the HeartMate II can be discharged from the hospital and the portability of the device's components makes it easier for the patient to remain active. The FDA approved the HeartMate II for bridge-to-transplantation therapy in April 2008 and for destination therapy in January 2010.
- PVAD (Paracorporeal Ventricular Assist Device). The Thoratec PVAD is an external, pulsatile, ventricular assist device, FDA-approved for bridge-to-transplantation, including home discharge, and post-cardiotomy recovery. It provides left, right, or biventricular support.
- CentriMag. The CentriMag blood pump is an extracorporeal circulatory support device providing hemodynamic stabilization in patients in need of cardiopulmonary support. It is cleared for clinical use up to six hours, and can be used as a short-term solution to support the circulation while longer-term options are considered. It is approved for use as a right ventricular assist device (RVAD) for periods of support up to 30 days for patients in cardiogenic shock due to acute right ventricular failure.
- PediMag. The PediMag blood pump, known as PediVAS outside the U.S., is an extracorporeal circulatory support device providing hemodynamic stabilization for pediatric patients in need of cardiopulmonary assistance. It is cleared for clinical use up to six hours, and can be used as a short-term solution to support the circulation while longer-term options are considered.

== Corporate governance ==
D. Keith Grossman, with degrees in life sciences and business and a career in the medical industry, joined Thoratec as president and CEO in January 1996. He focused on making a commercial success of the Thoratec VAD System, and he diversified and expanded the company's product line by initiating the acquisition of Thermo Cardiosystems. After reviving the company's profitability, Grossman left Thoratec in 2006 as the company was bringing the HeartMate II to market. He was replaced as president and CEO in January 2006 by Gerhard F. Burbach, formerly president and CEO of the cardiology and radiology company Digirad Corporation. In September 2014, Burbach stepped down and was replaced by his predecessor, D. Keith Grossman.
