= Wayne Griffin =

Wayne Robert Griffin (born 1975) is the second person in Australia to be implanted with the SynCardia Total artificial heart.

The artificial heart surgery was performed on 20 August 2010, by Dr. Phillip Spratt, the head of the Heart and Lung Transplant Unit of St Vincent's Hospital. He was assisted by Dr. Paul Jantz and supervised by Dr. Jack Copeland. The surgery was filmed by 60 Minutes Australia as "The Ultimate Bypass", which was aired in September 2010.
