= Destination therapy =

Destination therapy is a therapy that is final rather than being a transitional stage until another therapy—thus, in transportation metaphor, a destination in itself rather than merely a bridge or road to the destination. The term usually refers to ventricular assist devices or mechanical circulatory support to keep the existing heart going, not just until a heart transplant can occur, but for the rest of the patient's life expectancy. It is thus a course of treatment for severe (e.g., NYHA class IV/ACC stage D) heart failure patients who are not likely candidates for transplant. In contrast, bridge-to-transplant therapy is a way to stay alive long enough, and stay healthy enough, to await transplant while maintaining eligibility for transplant.

Heart failure is a leading cause of death in industrialized economies. Among those with serious heart illness some are, for a variety of possible medical circumstances, ineligible for a heart transplant. Destination therapy provides a possibility to extend their lives and improve their quality of life.

In addition, destination therapy may in some cases turn out to remedy the condition that excluded transplantation

Estimates place the population in the United States that may benefit from destination therapy at 50,000 – 100,000 patients per year. The addressable population outside of the US is thought be similar in size.

== Indications ==
In order for a patient to be recommended for destination therapy with an LVAD, he/she will have presented with end-stage heart failure, and will be ineligible for a transplant due to age, additional health problems, or other complications. In addition, patients may be eligible but are not suitable for heart transplant because they have other circulatory conditions unrelated to the heart.

== History ==
In 2000, the Randomized Evaluation of Mechanical Assistance for the Treatment of Congestive Heart Failure (REMATCH) trial was conducted. REMATCH was a multi-center study supported by the National Heart, Lung, and Blood Institute to compare long-term implantation of left ventricular assist devices with optimal medical management for patients with end-stage heart failure who require, but do not qualify to receive cardiac transplantation. Based on the results of this study, the U.S. Food and Drug Administration (FDA) granted a Premarket Approval for the Thoratec HeartMate XVE LVAD to be used for destination therapy. In addition, the Centers for Medicare and Medicaid Services expanded Medicare coverage to include such therapy.

== Procedure ==
=== Pre-operative ===
Most LVADs are implanted in scheduled operations and require careful preparation of the patient for surgery, including an assessment by an anesthesiologist. The cardiologist in the coronary care unit (CCU) usually stabilizes and prepares the patient for surgery. Some patients will have invasive monitoring instituted in the CCU and will be supported with inotropes, vasopressors and IABP. In addition, recent laboratory results and assessment of the patient's physical status are required. Patients are typically cross-matched for four units of blood.

=== Peri-operative ===
Ventricular assist devices require open-heart surgery for implantation. An incision is made through the breastbone to expose the heart. Heparin will be given to keep the patients blood from clotting. The blood is rerouted to a heart-lung machine that will pump and oxygenate blood. A pocket for the LVAD is formed in the abdominal wall. A tube is then used to channel blood from the ventricle to the LVAD. Another tube is used to connect the pump to the aorta. When the pump is adequately supporting the heart, the patient will be removed from the heart-lung machine and the chest will be closed.

=== Post-operative ===
During the REMATCH trial, several complications were reported for patients who received the LVAD. They reported post-operative pain after LVAD implantation. During an average 400 days of survival, 30 percent of the devices had an internal failure requiring another operation, and almost every patient who had a re-operation did not survive. Other adverse effects included bleeding, infection and lengthened hospital stays.

Quality of Life (QoL) measures found that the LVAD group scored better or equal to the medical-therapy management group.

== Prognosis ==
The REMATCH study randomly assigned 129 patients with Class IV end-stage heart failure who were ineligible for cardiac transplantation. Within the study, 68 patients received an LVAD and 61 patients received optimal medical management. Among the patients who received the LVAD, there was a reduction of 48 percent in the risk of death from any cause, compared with the medical-therapy group.

Rates of survival among REMATCH study patients:

Survival rates among REMATCH study patients
Time frame	Patients with LVAD	Patients receiving optimal medical therapy
At 12 months	52%	25%
At 24 months	23%	8%

The frequency of serious adverse events in the LVAD group was 2.35 times that in the medical-therapy group, with a predominance of infection, bleeding and malfunction of the device. However, the quality of life was significantly improved at one year in the LVAD group.
