= Figurative analogy =

A figurative analogy is a comparison about two things that are not alike but share only some common property. On the other hand, a literal analogy is about two things that are nearly exactly alike.

The two things compared in a figurative analogy are not obviously comparable in most respects. Metaphors and similes are two types of figurative analogies.

In the course of analogical reasoning, figurative analogies become weak if the disanalogies of the entities being compared are relevant—in the same way that literal analogies become weak. Consider the disanalogies involving two cars in a literal analogy (the same principle concerning disanalogies is true for a figurative analogy): The day they were purchased isn't relevant whereas the previous accidents of the two cars would be relevant. If car A has been in five accidents while car B has been in no accidents, then the conclusion drawn about the future performance of the two cars is affected.

== See also ==
- Zero-knowledge proof
