= Ventricular assist device =

Medical device to assist or replace a heart

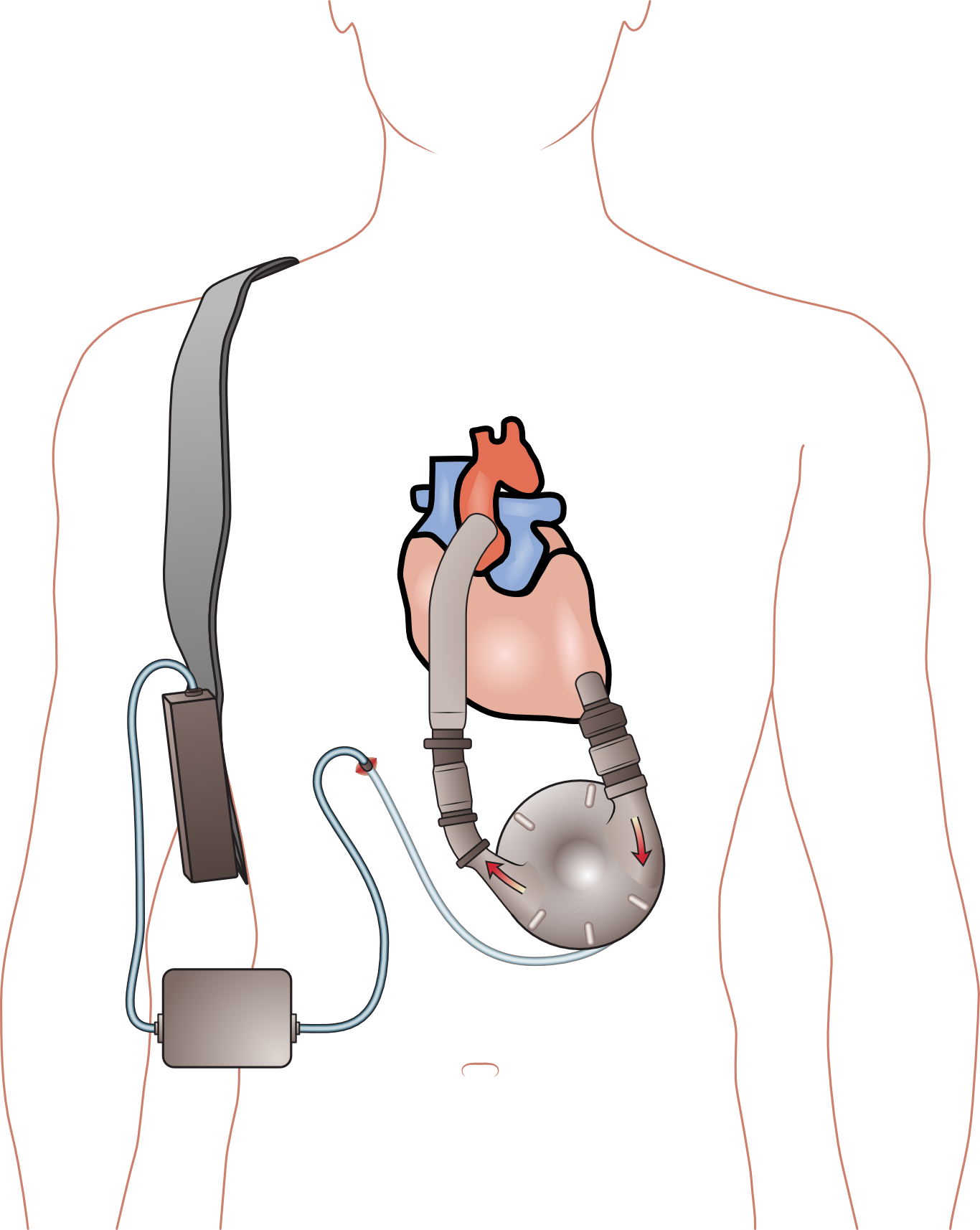
- A left ventricular assist device (LVAD) pumping blood from the left ventricle to the aorta, connected to an externally worn control unit and battery pack.
- MedlinePlus: 007268

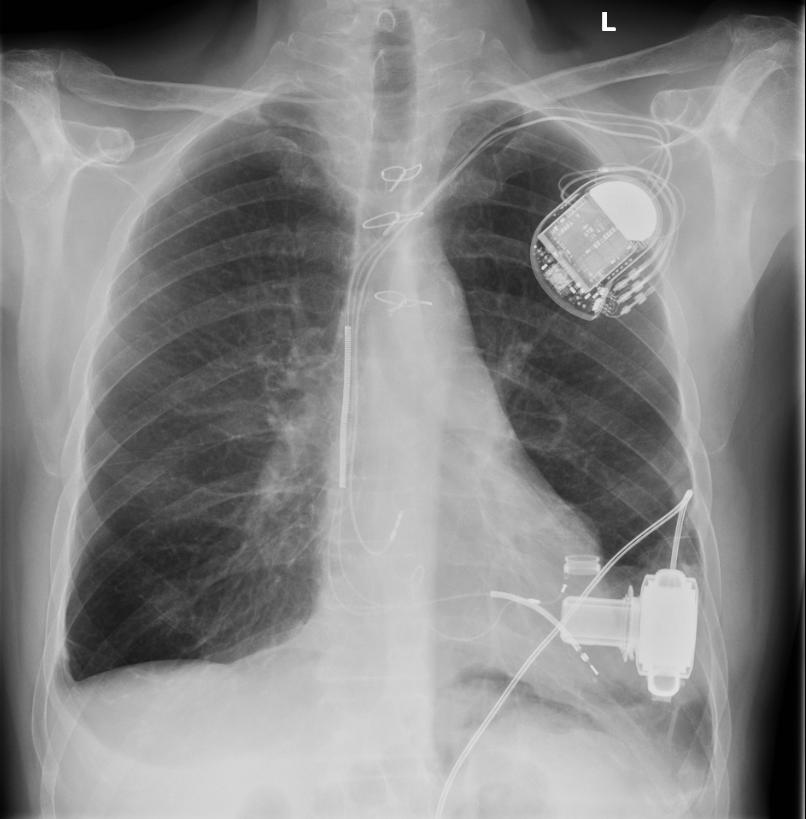
Implanted LVAD on X-ray (a pacemaker is also shown at left pectoral area)

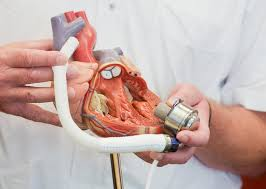
Holding LVAD fitted to model heart

A ventricular assist device (VAD), also known as a ventricular assist system (VAS), is an electromechanical medical device that, by use of an artificial pump inserted into one or both of the ventricles, assists the heart in delivering blood to the rest of the body.

Ventricular assist devices are designed to support cardiac pump function in patients suffering from acute or chronic heart failure or other weakening of the heart, with the devices partially or completely replacing the organ's functions. The type of VAD implanted depends on whether the device will support the heart's left ventricle (LVAD), right ventricle (RVAD), or both ventricles (BiVAD), as well as whether it will be used in the short-term, such as recovery from myocardial infarction, or the long-term, such as bridge to transplantation or destination therapy.

== Types of pumps ==
The pumps used in VADs can be divided into two main categories – pulsatile pumps, which mimic the natural pulsing action of the heart, and continuous-flow pumps.

=== Pulsatile pump ===
Pulsatile VADs, such as the HeartMate XVE or Novacor, mimic the natural pulsing action of the heart using positive displacement pumps. In some pulsatile pumps using compressed air as an energy source, the volume occupied by blood varies during the pumping cycle.

=== Continuous-flow pump ===
Continuous-flow VADs, like the HeartMate III and the Jarvik 2000 FlowMaker, normally use either a centrifugal pump or an axial flow pump, with both types containing a central rotor with permanent magnets. Controlled electric currents running through coils contained in the pump housing apply forces to the magnets, which in turn cause the rotors to spin. In centrifugal pumps, the rotors are shaped to accelerate the blood circumferentially and move it towards the outer rim of the pump, whereas the rotors of axial flow pumps are typically cylindrical with helical blades that accelerate the blood in the direction of the rotor's axis. Continuous-flow VADs are smaller and more durable than pulsatile VADs.

Early VADs utilizing continuous-flow pumps, such as the MicroMed DeBakey VAD or Jarvik 2000 FlowMaker, used solid bearings made of materials like ceramic to suspend the device's rotor; however, newer pumps use either magnetic levitation ("maglev") or hydrodynamic suspension.

== Design ==
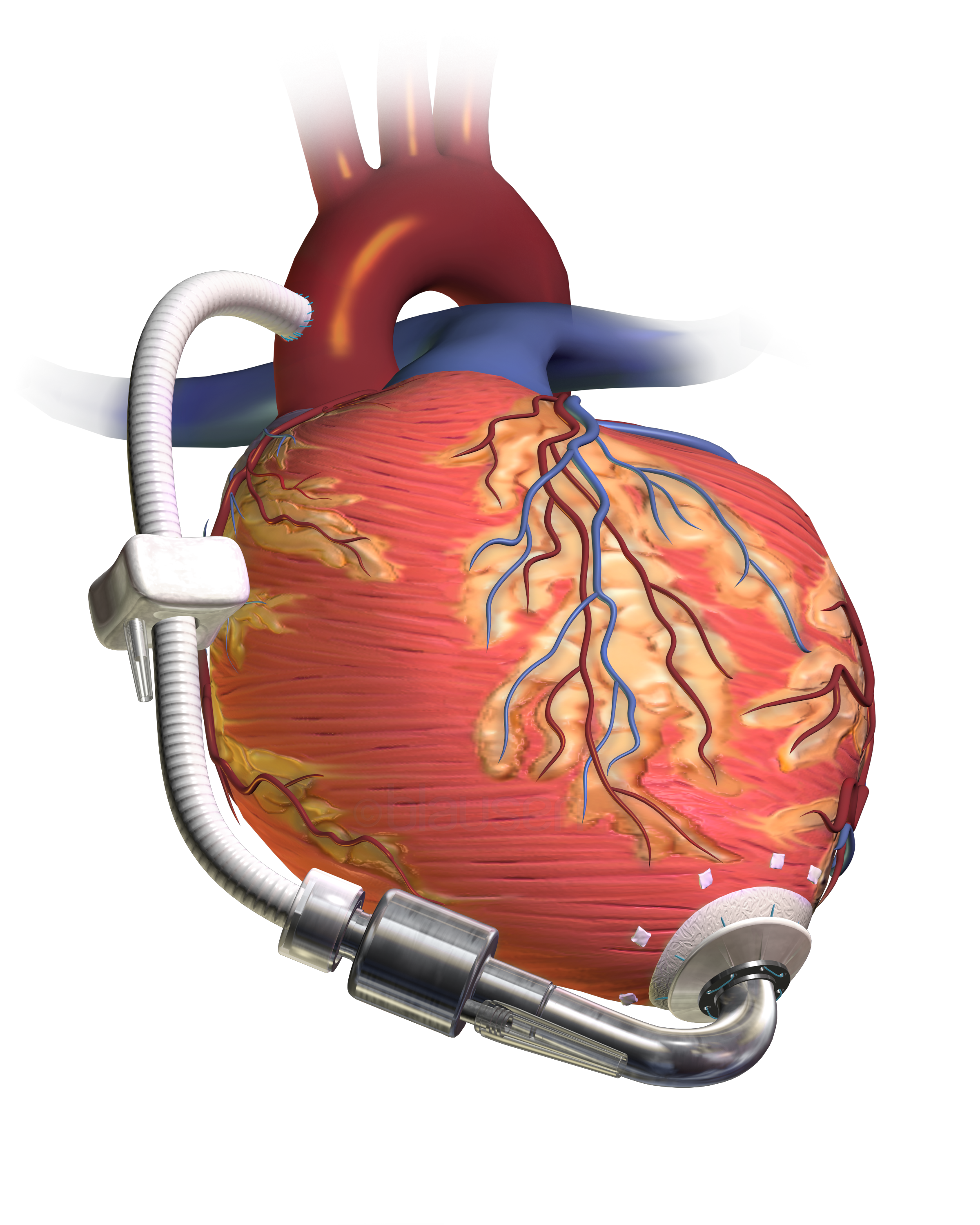
Close-up illustration of typical left ventricular assist device (LVAD)

The majority of modern VADs on the market are somewhat bulky. The smallest device approved by the FDA, the HeartMate II, weighs about 1 pound (0.45 kg) and measures 3 inches (7.6 cm). This has proven particularly important for women and children, for whom alternatives would have been too large. As of 2017, HeartMate III has been approved by the FDA. It is smaller than its predecessor HeartMate II and uses a full maglev impeller instead of the cup-and-ball bearing system found in HeartMate II.

In patients with acute signs of heart failure, small percutaneous (introduced to the heart through the skin into a blood vessel rather than through an incision) VADs such as the Impella 5.5, Impella RP, and others can be introduced to either the left or right ventricle (depending on the patient-specific needs) using a wire and that is introduced through the arteries or veins of the neck, axilla, or groin.

== Studies and outcomes ==
In a small number of cases, left ventricular assist devices, combined with drug therapy, have enabled the heart to recover sufficiently for the device to be able to be removed (explanted). Several surgical approaches, including interventional decommissioning, off-pump explantation using a custom-made plug, and complete LVAD removal through redo sternotomy, have been described with a 5-year survival of up to 80%.

Peter Houghton was the longest surviving recipient of a VAD for permanent use. Following implantation of a Jarvik 2000 FlowMaker in June 2000, he completed a 91-mile charity walk, published two books, lectured widely, hiked in the Swiss Alps and the American West, flew in an ultra-light aircraft, and traveled extensively around the world before dying of acute renal failure in 2007 at the age of 69.

=== Recent developments ===
- In July 2009 in England, surgeons removed a donor heart that had been implanted in a toddler next to her native heart, after her native heart had recovered. This technique suggests mechanical assist device, such as an LVAD, can take some or all the work away from the native heart and allow it time to heal.
- In July 2009, 18-month follow-up results from the HeartMate II Clinical Trial concluded that continuous-flow LVAD provides effective hemodynamic support for at least 18 months in patients awaiting transplantation, with improved functional status and quality of life.
- Heidelberg University Hospital reported in July 2009 that the first HeartAssist5, known as the modern version of the DeBakey VAD, was implanted there.
- A phase 1 clinical trial is underway (as of August 2009), consisting of patients with coronary artery bypass grafting and patients in end-stage heart failure who have a left ventricular assist device. The trial involves testing a patch called Anginera which contains cells that secrete hormone-like growth factors stimulating other cells to grow. The patches are seeded with heart muscle cells and then implanted onto the heart with the goal of getting the muscle cells to start communicating with native tissues in a way that allows for regular contractions.
- In September 2009, a New Zealand news outlet, Stuff, reported that in another 18 months to two years, a new wireless device will be ready for clinical trial that will power VADs without direct contact. If successful, this may reduce the chance of infection as a result of the power cable through the skin.
- The National Institutes of Health (NIH) awarded a $2.8 million grant to develop a "pulse-less" total artificial heart using two VADs by MicroMed, initially created by Michael DeBakey and George Noon. The grant was renewed for a second year of research in August 2009. The total artificial heart was created using two HeartAssist5 VADs, whereby one VAD pumps blood throughout the body and the other circulates blood to and from the lungs.
- HeartWare International announced in August 2009 that it had surpassed 50 implants of their HeartWare Ventricular Assist System in their ADVANCE Clinical Trial, an FDA-approved IDE study. The study is to assess the system as bridge-to-transplantation for patients with end-stage heart failure. The study, Evaluation of the HeartWare LVAD System for the Treatment of Advanced Heart Failure, is a multi-center study that started in May 2009.
- On 27 June 2014 Hannover Medical School in Hannover, Germany performed the first human implant of HeartMate III under the direction of Professor Axel Haverich M.D., chief of the Cardiothoracic, Transplantation and Vascular Surgery Department and surgeon Jan Schmitto, M.D., PhD
- On 21 January 2015 a study was published in Journal of American College of Cardiology suggesting that long-term use of LVAD may induce heart regeneration.
- Hall-of-Fame Baseball Player Rod Carew had congestive heart failure and was fitted with a HeartMate II. He struggled with wearing the equipment, so he joined efforts to help supply the most helpful wear to assist the HeartMate II and HeartMate III.
- In December 2018, two clinical cases were performed in Kazakhstan and a fully wireless LVAD system of Jarvik 2000 combine with Leviticus Cardio FiVAD (Fully Implantable Ventricular Assist Device) were implanted in humans. The Wireless power transfer technology based on technique called Coplanar Energy Transfer (CET) which is capable of transferring energy from an external transmitting coil to a small receiving coil that is implanted in the human body. In the early postoperative phase, CET operation was accomplished as expected in both patients, which powered the pump and maintained the battery charged to allow medical and nursing procedures. The Leviticus Cardio FiVAD System with wireless, coplanar energy transfer technology which ameliorates infection risk by driveline elimination while providing successful energy transmission allowing for a substantial (approximately 6 hours) unholstered support of the LVAD.

=== HeartMate II LVAD pivotal study ===
A series of studies involving the use of the HeartMate II LVAD have proven useful in establishing the viability and risks of using LVADs for bridge-to-transplantation and destination therapy.

- The HeartMate II pivotal trial began in 2005 and included the evaluation of HeartMate II for two indications: Bridge to transplantation (BTT) and destination therapy (DT), or long-term, permanent support. Thoratec Corp. announced that this was the first time the FDA had approved a clinical trial to include both indications in one protocol.
- A multicenter study in the United States from 2005 to 2007 with 113 patients (of which 100 reported principal outcomes) showed that significant improvements in function were prevalent after three months, and a survival rate of 68% after twelve months.
- Based on one-year follow up data from the first 194 patients enrolled in the trial, the FDA approved HeartMate II for bridge-to-transplantation. The trial provided clinical evidence of improved survival rates and quality of life for a broad range of patients.
- Eighteen-month follow up data on 281 patients who had either reached the study end-point or completed 18 months of post-operative follow-up showed improved survival, less frequent adverse events and greater reliability with continuous flow LVADS compared to pulsatile flow devices. Of the 281 patients, 157 patients had undergone transplant, 58 patients were continuing with LVADs in their body and seven patients had the LVAD removed because their heart recovered; the remaining 56 had died. The results showed that the patients' NYHA Class of heart failure had significantly improved after six months of LVAD support compared to the pre-LVAD baseline. Although this trial involved bridge-to-transplant indication, the results provide early evidence that continuous flow LVADs have advantages in terms of durability and reliability for patients receiving mechanical support for destination therapy.
- Following the FDA approval of HeartMate II LVAD for bridge-to-transplantation purposes, a post-approval ("registry") study was undertaken to assess the efficacy of the device in a commercial setting. The study found that the device improved outcomes, both compared to other LVAD treatments and baseline patients. Specifically, HeartMate II patients showed lower creatinine levels, 30-day survival rates were considerably higher at 96%, and 93% reached successful outcomes (transplant, cardiac recovery, or long-term LVAD).

=== HARPS ===
The Harefield Recovery Protocol Study (HARPS) is a clinical trial to evaluate whether advanced heart failure patients requiring VAD support can recover sufficient myocardial function to allow device removal (known as explantation). HARPS combines an LVAD (the HeartMate XVE) with conventional oral heart failure medications, followed by the novel β2 agonist clenbuterol. This opens the possibility that some advanced heart failure patients may forgo heart transplantation.

=== REMATCH ===
The REMATCH (Randomized Evaluation of Mechanical Assistance for the Treatment of Congestive Heart Failure) clinical trial began in May 1998 and ran through July 2001 in 20 cardiac transplant centers around the USA. The trial was designed to compare long-term implantation of left ventricular assist devices with optimal medical management for patients with end-stage heart failure who require, but do not qualify to receive cardiac transplantation. As a result of the clinical outcomes, the device received FDA approval for both indications, in 2001 and 2003, respectively.

According to a retrospective cohort study comparing patients treated with a left ventricular assist device versus inotrope therapy while awaiting heart transplantation, the group treated with LVAD had improved clinical and metabolic function at the time of transplant with better blood pressure, sodium, blood urea nitrogen, and creatinine. After transplant, 57.7% of the inotrope group had kidney failure versus 16.6% in the LVAD group; 31.6% of the inotrope group had right heart failure versus 5.6% in the LVAD group; and event-free survival was 15.8% in the inotrope group versus 55.6% in the LVAD group.

== Considerations ==
Considering the multitude of risks and lifestyle modifications associated with ventricular assist device implants, it is important for prospective patients to be informed prior to decision making. In addition to physician consult, various Internet-based patient directed resources are available to assist in patient education.

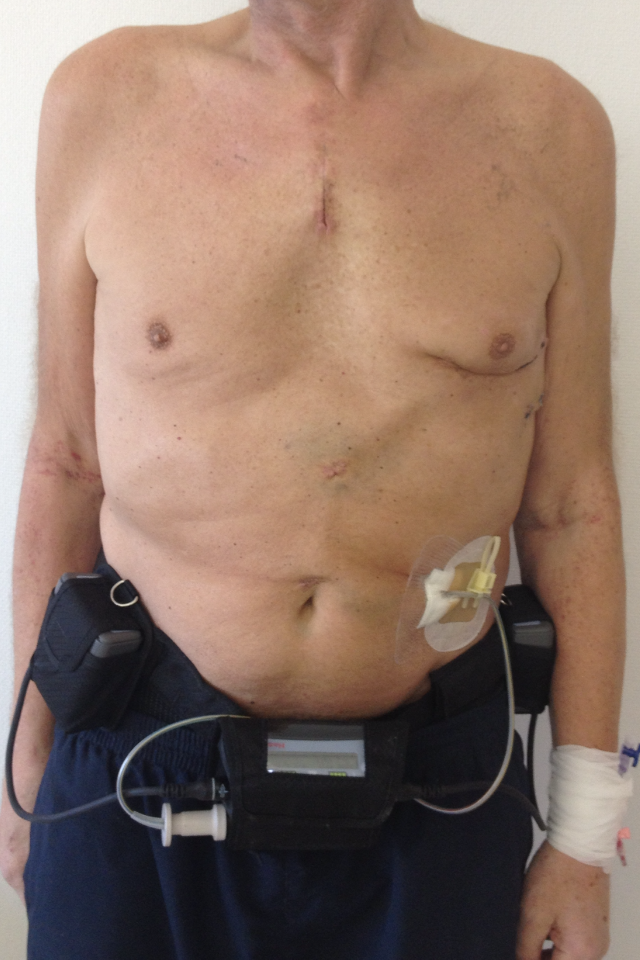
Patient "wearing" an LVAD

=== Complications ===
Because VADs generally result in blood flowing over a non-biologic surface (e.g. metal, synthetic polymers, etc.) this can result in formation of blood clots, also referred to as thrombosis. Due to these clotting abnormalities, anticoagulants are used to decrease the risk of thrombosis. These medications carry their own risks, with bleeding being the most common postoperative early complication after implantation or explantation of VADs, necessitating reoperation in up to 60% of recipients. Bleeding most often occurs in the gastrointestinal tract resulting in dark or bright red stools, though intracranial bleeding may also occur if trauma to the head is experienced. Bleeding events may require massive blood transfusions and incur certain risks including infection, pulmonary insufficiency, increased costs, right heart failure, allosensitization, and viral transmission, which can prove fatal or preclude transplantation. When bleeding occurs, it impacts the one year Kaplan-Meier mortality. In addition to complexity of the patient population and the complexity of these procedures contributing to bleeding, the devices themselves may contribute to the severe coagulopathy that can ensue when these devices are implanted.

In patients with VADs, ischemic strokes and pump thrombosis occur when there is inadequate anticoagulation to counter act the blood's tendency to form blood clots when exposed to the foreign materials in a VAD. Stroke risk varies based on the type of VAD in place and other risk factors. Both atrial fibriliation and high blood pressure may increase risk of stroke and high blood pressure can increase a patient's risk of stroke in the setting of VAD use. However, it is difficult to measure blood pressure in LVAD patients using standard blood pressure monitoring and the current practice is to measure by Doppler ultrasonography in outpatients and invasive arterial blood pressure monitoring in inpatients.

Infections in VAD patients occur because the artificial surfaces of the devices serve as a surface for bacterial and or fungal growth. Most infections are classified as driveline infections, which are infections that occur where the device's power cord enters the skin (usually in the upper abdomen)

VAD-related infection can be caused by a large number of different organisms:

- Gram positive bacteria (Staphylococci, especially Staph. aureus, Enterococci)
- Gram negative bacteria (Pseudomonas aeruginosa, Enterobacter species, Klebsiella species)
- Fungi, especially Candida species

Other immune system related problems include immunosuppression. Some of the polyurethane components used in the devices cause the deletion of a subset of immune cells when blood comes in contact with them. This predisposes the patient to fungal and some viral infections necessitating appropriate prophylactic therapy.

== History ==
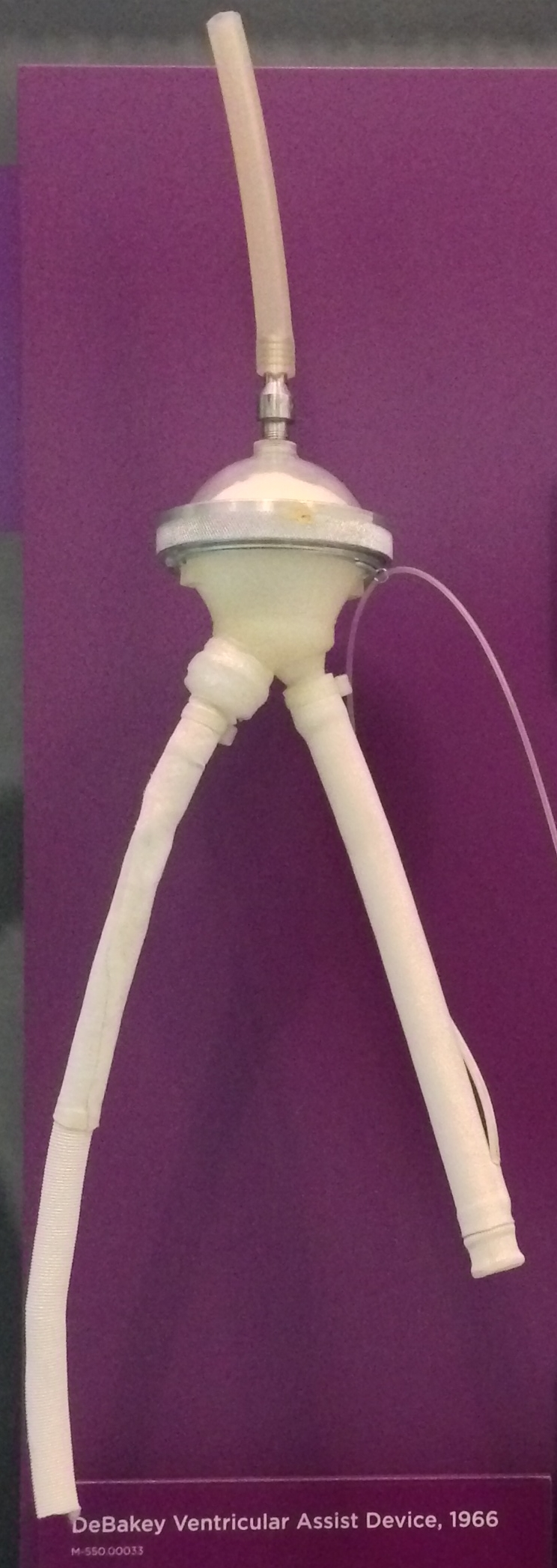
1966 Liotta-DeBakey ventricular assist device.

The first left ventricular assist device (LVAD) system was created by Domingo Liotta at Baylor College of Medicine in Houston in 1962. The first LVAD was implanted in 1963 by Liotta and E. Stanley Crawford. The first successful implantation of an LVAD was completed in 1966 by Liotta along with Dr. Michael E. DeBakey. The patient was a 37-year-old woman, and a paracorporeal (external) circuit was able to provide mechanical support for 10 days after the surgery. The first successful long-term implantation of an LVAD was conducted in 1988 by Dr. William F. Bernhard of Boston Children's Hospital Medical Center and Thermedics, Inc. of Woburn, MA, under a National Institutes of Health (NIH) research contract which developed HeartMate, an electronically controlled assist device. This was funded by a three-year $6.2 million contract to Thermedics and Children's Hospital, Boston, MA, from the National Heart, Lung, and Blood Institute, a program of the NIH. The early VADs emulated the heart by using a "pulsatile" action where blood is alternately sucked into the pump from the left ventricle then forced out into the aorta. Devices of this kind include the HeartMate IP LVAS, which was approved for use in the US by the Food and Drug Administration (FDA) in October 1994. These devices began to gain acceptance in the late 1990s as heart surgeons including Eric Rose, O. H. Frazier and Mehmet Oz began popularizing the concept that patients could live outside the hospital. Media coverage of outpatients with VADs underscored these arguments.

More recent work has concentrated on continuous-flow pumps, which can be roughly categorized as either centrifugal pumps or axial flow impeller driven pumps. These pumps have the advantage of greater simplicity resulting in smaller size and greater reliability. These devices are referred to as second-generation VADs. A side effect is that the user will not have a pulse, or that the pulse intensity will be seriously reduced.

In August 2007 the International Consortium of Circulatory Assist Clinicians (ICCAC) was founded by Anthony "Tony" Martin, a nurse practitioner and clinical manager of the mechanical circulatory support program at Newark Beth Israel Medical Center, Newark, N.J. The ICCAC was developed as a 501c3 organization, dedicated to the development of best practices and education related to the care of individuals requiring MCS as a bridge to heart transplantation or as destination therapy in those individuals who don't meet the criteria for heart transplantation.

== List of implantable VAD devices ==
Device	Manufacturer	Type	Approval status	Notes
C-Pulse	Sunshine Heart	Pulsatile, driven by an inflatable cuff around the aorta		Abandoned in September 2016 following its manufacturer rebranding to CHF Solutions and refocusing solely on the Aquadex FlexFlow.
DuraHeart	Terumo	Magnetically-levitated centrifugal pump	European Union: Approved	US FDA trials underway as of January 2010
EXCOR	Berlin Heart	External membrane pump	European Union: Approved; United States: Approved (humanitarian device exemption)	As of October 2026, commercially available in adult and pediatric models.
HeartAssist5	ReliantHeart	Continuous axial flow	European Union: Approved; United States: Approved (humanitarian device exemption, pediatric)	
HeartMate XVE	Thoratec	Pulsatile	European Union: Approved; United States: Approved	The device is no longer available as of 2009-2010, having been replaced by the HeartMate II.
HeartMate II	Thoratec	Continuous axial flow	European Union: Approved; United States: Approved	
HeartMate III	Thoratec	Continuous axial flow	United States: Approved	
Heartware Ventricular Assist Device (HVAD)	HeartWare	Continuous axial flow	European Union: Approved (formerly); United States: Approved (formerly)	Could be implanted through limited access without sternotomy. Medtronic, who purchased HeartWare in August 2016, stopped all production and sales of the HVAD in June 2021 following reports of an increased risk of adverse neurological events and fatalities associated with the device in addition to reported incidents of the device's pump delaying or failing to restart after being stopped.
INCOR	Berlin Heart	Continuous axial flow	European Union: Approved; United States: Case-by-case humanitarian approvals only	No longer appears to be commercially available.
Jarvik 2000 FlowMaker	Jarvik Heart	Continuous axial flow	European Union: Approved; United States: Investigational	No longer commercially available.
Leviticus Cardio Fully Implantable VAD (FiVAD)	Leviticus Cardio	Universal wireless system for controlling, monitoring, and powering LVADs	United States: Investigational	Granted breakthrough device designation by the Food and Drug Administration in 2019.
MicroMed DeBakey VAD	MicroMed Cardiovascular	Continuous axial flow	European Union: Approved; United States: Approved (pediatric model)	Undergoing clinical trials in USA for FDA approval.
MiTiHeart LVAD	MiTiHeart Corporation	Continuous axial flow		Currently in animal testing, recently completed successful 60-day calf implant.
MVAD	HeartWare	Continuous axial flow		Completed GLP studies in September 2011.
Novacor	WorldHeart	Pulsatile	European Union: Approved; North America: Approved; Japan: Approved	Clinically used since 1984; sales discontinued in 2008. A second iteration, the Novacor II, was undergoing clinical trials in 2006 prior to its cancellation.
Thoratec Implantable Ventricular Assist Device (IVAD)	Thoratec	Pulsatile	European Union: Approved; United States: Approved (bridge to transplant, internal implant only)	Not authorized for paracorporeal implant due to reliability issues.
Thoratec Paracorporeal Ventricular Assist Device (PVAD)	Thoratec	Pulsatile	European Union: Approved; United States: Approved (bridge to transplant, post-cardiotomy recovery)	
VentrAssist	Ventracor	Continuous axial flow	Australia: Approved; European Union: Approved	Manufacturer declared bankruptcy while clinical trials for FDA approval were underway in 2009; intellectual property sold to Thoratec.

== See also ==
- Artificial heart
- Extracorporeal membrane oxygenation
- Implantable cardioverter-defibrillator
- Intra-aortic balloon pump
- Pacemaker
- Pump thrombosis
