= Heart of Cape Town Museum =

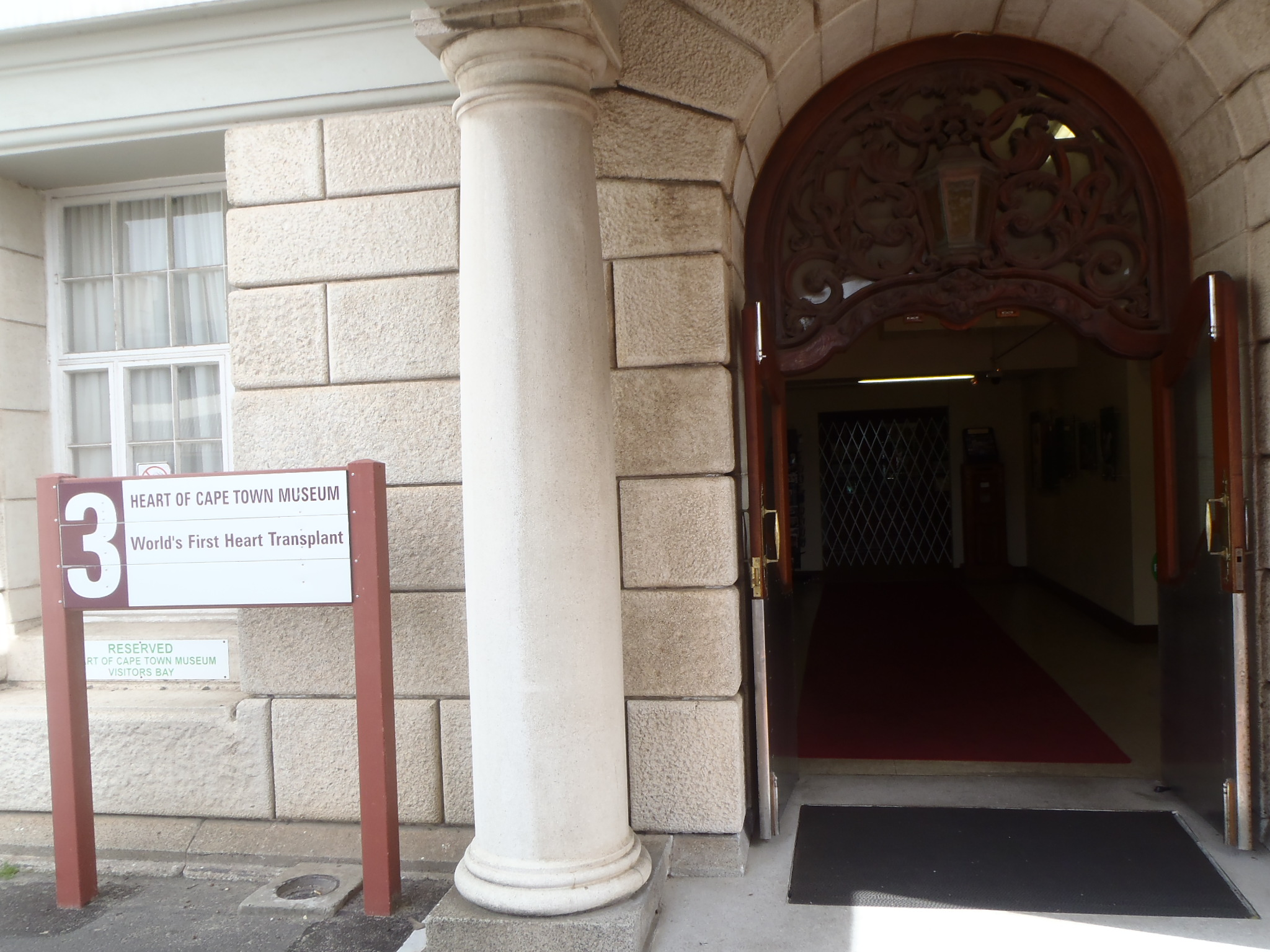
- Old Main Building of Groote Schuur Hospital

- Shown in Cape Town
- Established: 2007
- Location: Observatory, Cape Town South Africa
- Coordinates: 33.941°S 18.463°E
- Type: Specialized museums
- Curator: Hennie Joubert
- Website: www.heartofcapetown.co.za

The Heart of Cape Town Museum is a museum complex in the Observatory suburb of Cape Town, South Africa. It is in the Groote Schuur Hospital on Main Road. The hospital was founded in 1938 and is famous for being the institution where the first human heart transplant took place, conducted by University of Cape Town-educated surgeon Christiaan Barnard on the patient Louis Washkansky. The museum opened on December 3, 2007, marking the 40th anniversary of the heart transplant by Christiaan Barnard. The Heart of Cape Town Museum honors everyone who played a major role in a surgical feat that created a new medical era. It also brings attention to ethical and moral implications that came up at the time. It also highlights the ways in which Barnard's accomplishment put South Africa and the University of Cape Town on an international stage.

== Museum ==
The museum is laid out in the Old Main Building of the Groote Schuur Hospital in the original rooms where the first heart transplant surgery occurred. It utilizes the same operating theaters originally used in December 1967 when Denise Darvall and her mother were rushed into the hospital after being struck by a vehicle. The recipient of Darval's heart was Louis Washkansky, a 54-year-old grocer, suffering from diabetes and incurable heart disease. A two-hour guided tour provides insight into the donor of the heart, the recipient, the ethical and religious issues regarding "moment of death" and more. The guided tour of the museum starts with a representation of the car accident that provided the heart for the transplant, through to the animal lab where Barnard conducted experiments with over 50 dogs to perfect the technique of heart transplantation. From there one can tour a model of Denise Darvall's bedroom and Christiaan Barnard's office before seeing a recreation of the surgery in the actual operating theaters where it occurred. Finally, visitors see a re-creation of Louis Washkansky's recovery room after which they can be assisted by tour guides to register as organ donors. The museum also features a long hallway filled with letters of acclaim and criticism for Barnard showing the ethical backlash and international attention that the surgery received.

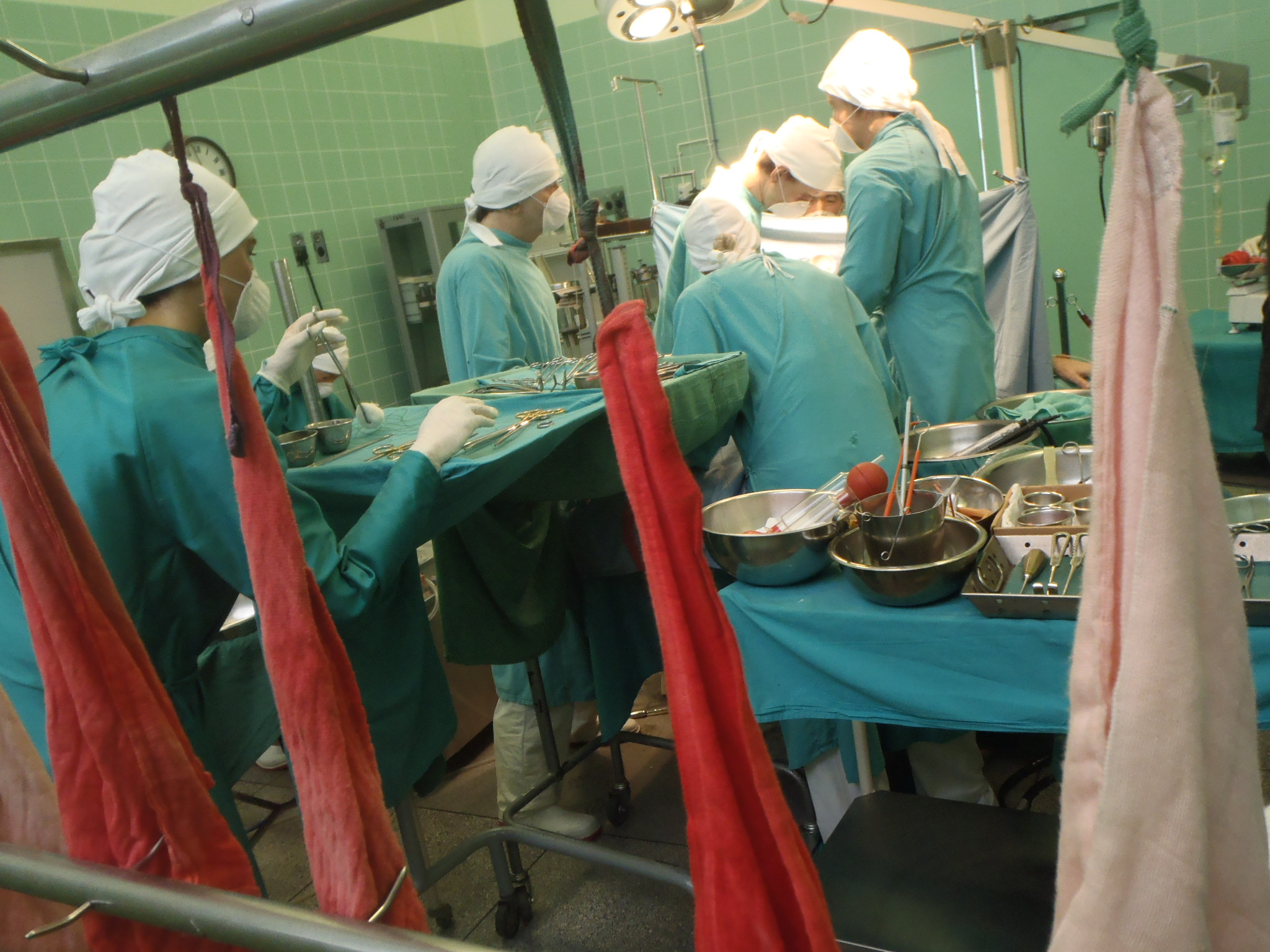

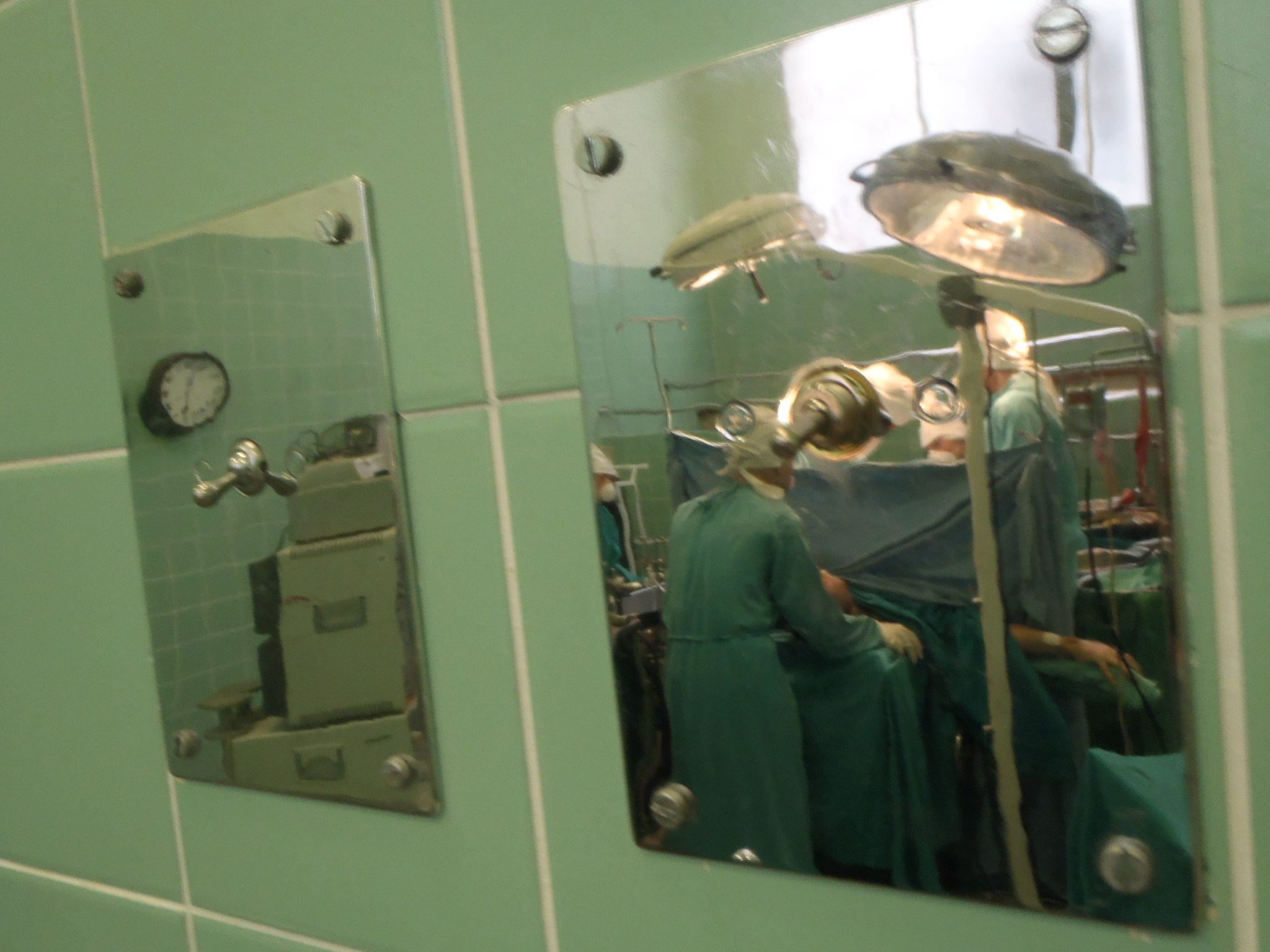

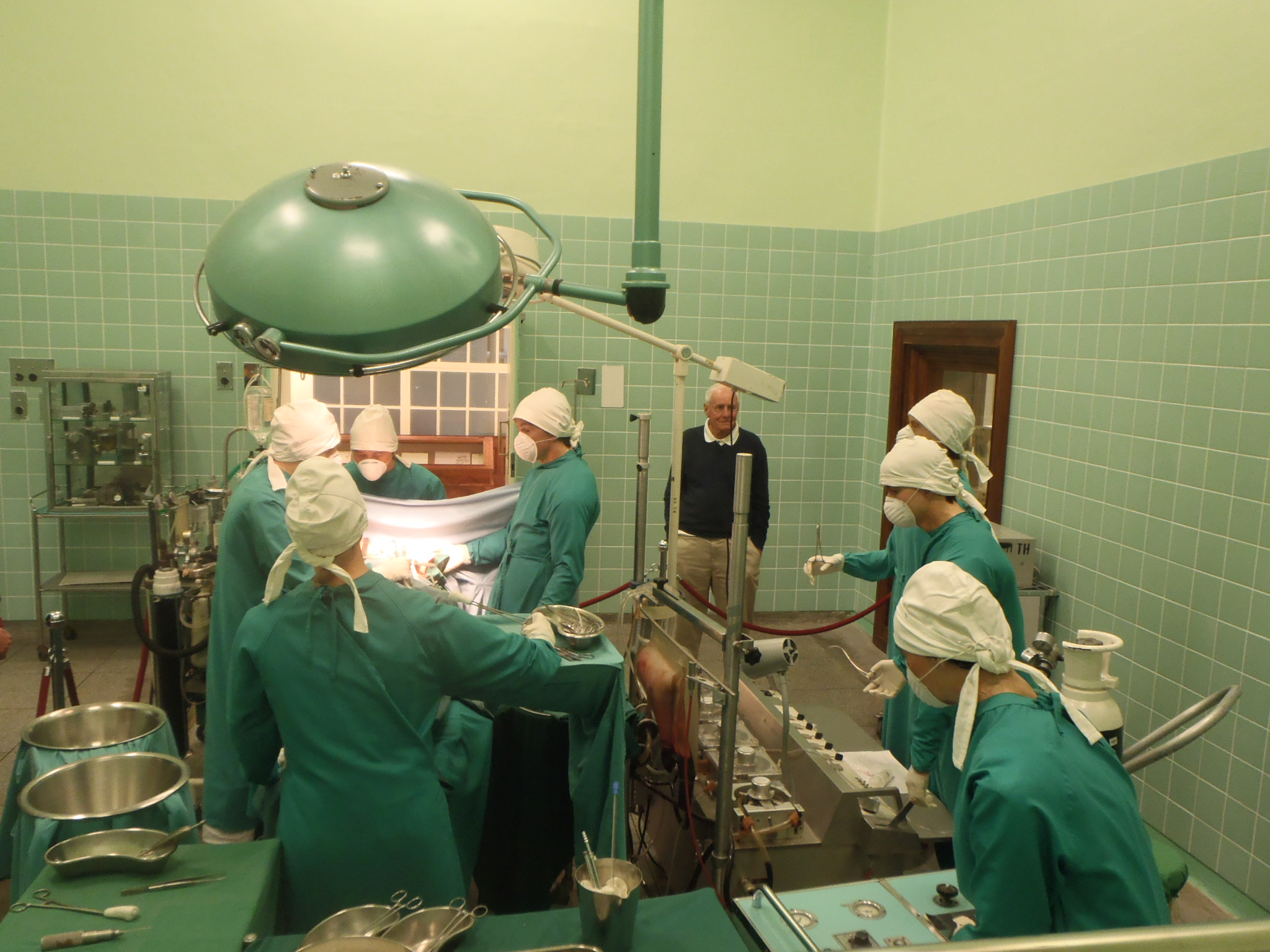

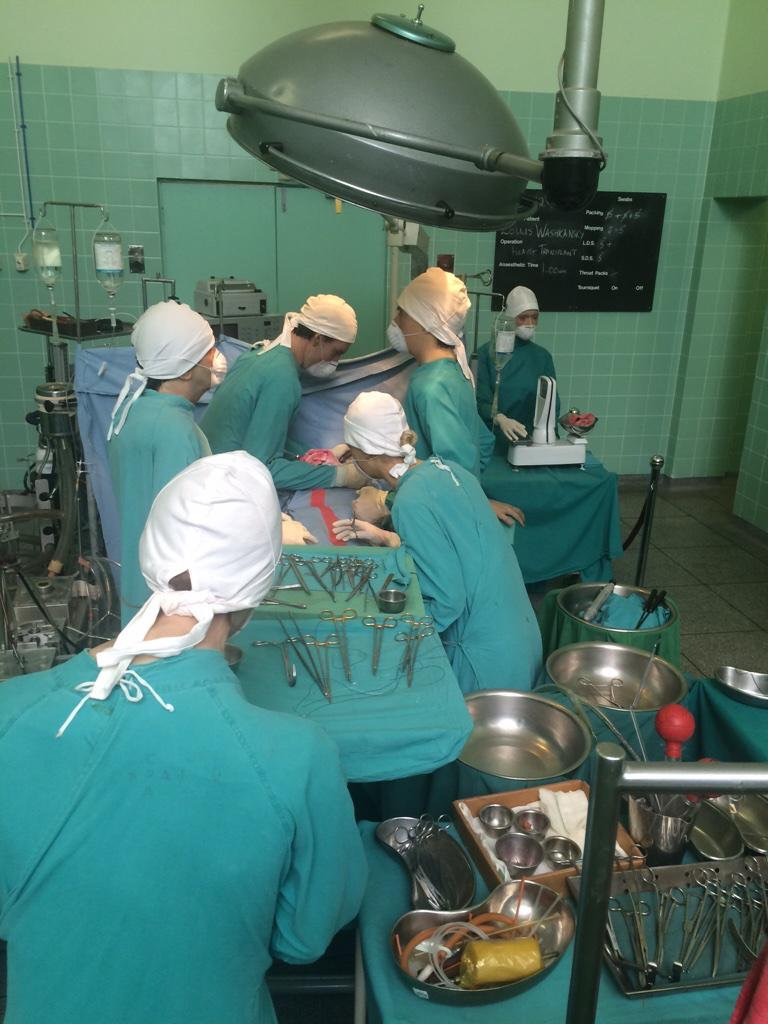
Recreation of Dr. Christian Barnard's First Heart Transplant

== Reception of museum ==
The museum was ranked by Lonely Planet travelers as #67 of 918 things to do in Cape Town. The travel website "What's Up Cape Town" has called it a must-see museum in Cape Town.

== People of relevance ==
- Christiaan Barnard
- Norman Shumway
- Denise Darvall
- Louis Washkansky
- Marius Barnard
