= Hamilton Naki =

South African surgeon (1926–2005)

- Born: 26 June 1926; Ngcingane, Centane, Transkei, South Africa
- Died: 29 May 2005 (aged 78); Langa, Cape Town, South Africa
- Children: 5
- Awards: The Bronze Order of Mapungubwe
- Scientific career
- Fields: Organ transplantation
- Workplaces: University of Cape Town

Hamilton Naki (26 June 1926 – 29 May 2005) was a South African laboratory assistant known for his contributions to surgical research and medical training despite having no formal medical training. He worked with cardiac surgeon Christiaan Barnard at the University of Cape Town, where he was involved with organ transplant research on animals and trained medical students in surgical techniques. His contributions to medical science, particularly in an era of racial segregation and apartheid, have been recognized as remarkable.

Following his death, controversy arose regarding false claims in multiple obituaries, including those published by at least five periodicals and the Associated Press, that stated he participated in the world's first human-to-human heart transplantation in 1967. These statements were later retracted due to lack of evidence. The incident has been cited as an example of inadequate fact-checking in journalism, and delayed correction of reporting errors.

== Early life ==
Naki was born to a poor family in Ngcingwane, a village in Centani in the Eastern Cape province of South Africa. He received six years of education up to the age of 14, after which he moved to Cape Town. Beginning about 1940, he commuted from Langa, Cape Town to the University of Cape Town to work as a gardener, specifically rolling grass tennis courts.

== Medical career and retirement ==
In 1954 Robert Goetz of the University's surgical faculty asked Naki to assist him with laboratory animals. Naki's responsibilities progressed from cleaning cages to performing anaesthesia. Most of Naki's work under Goetz involved anaesthetising dogs, but Naki also assisted in operating on a giraffe "to dissect the jugular venous valves to determine why giraffes do not faint when bending to drink."

Several years after Goetz left, Naki started working for Christiaan Barnard in the laboratory as an assistant. Barnard had studied open-heart surgery techniques in the United States and was bringing those techniques to South Africa. Naki first performed anaesthesia on animals for Barnard, but was then "appointed principal surgical assistant of the laboratory because of his remarkable skill and dexterity." Barnard was quoted as saying "If Hamilton had had the opportunity to study, he would probably have become a brilliant surgeon" and that Naki was "one of the great researchers of all time in the field of heart transplants".

In 1968, Barnard's cardiac surgical research team moved out of the surgical laboratory, and Naki helped develop the heterotopic or "piggyback" heart transplantation technique. In the 1970s, Naki left Barnard's team and returned to the surgical laboratory, this time working on liver transplantation. His contributions at this time were described as follows:

- Rosemary Hickman, transplantation surgeon whom Naki assisted and taught in the laboratory, and who worked with Naki for nearly 30 years: "Despite his limited conventional education, he had an amazing ability to learn anatomical names and recognize anomalies. His skills ranged from assisting to operating and he frequently prepared the donor animal (sometimes single-handedly) while another team worked on the recipient."
- Del Khan, head of Groote Schuur Hospital's organ transplant unit, whom Naki taught in the laboratory: "A liver transplant on a pig in the U.S. would involve a team of two or three medically qualified surgeons… Hamilton can do this all on his own."
- Ralph Kirsch, head of the Liver Research Centre at the University of Cape Town: “He was one of those remarkable men who really come around once in a long time. As a man without any education, he mastered surgical techniques at the highest level and passed them on to young doctors."
- Barnard: "A liver transplant is much more difficult than a heart transplant… [doctors who work with Naki] tell me that Hamilton can do all the various aspects of liver transplantation, which I can't do. So technically, he is a better surgeon than I am."

Naki taught many students during his career; although newsmedia accounts placed the number of students in the thousands, Hickman said that that number appears to have been exaggerated. Naki assisted Hickman until his retirement in 1991, after which he received "a gardener's pension: 760 rand, or about $275, a month."

== Personal life, post-retirement activities and recognition, and death ==
Naki was reported to be married with four sons and one daughter. He lived in a small one-room house without electricity or running water and sent "most of his pay to his wife and family, left behind in Transkei," but "could pay for only one of his five children to stay to the end of high school." He was active in his church and read the Bible frequently.

After retirement, Naki helped the community of Kentani, where part of his family lived, for example "in the construction of a school and in the provision of a mobile clinic" by soliciting donations from his "medical contacts". He received public recognition of his medical work after his retirement, including:

- Metropolitan Eastern Cape Award, 2002.
- The Bronze Order of Mapungubwe, 2002, presented by President Thabo Mbeki. One of the highest South African civil honours, this Order is "awarded to South African citizens for excellence and exceptional achievement."
- BTWSC Black S/Heroes Award, 2003.
- An honorary master's degree from the University of Cape Town in 2003, presented by Chancellor Graça Machel. The honorary degree was described as MMed (Master of Medicine) in some sources and MSc (Master of Science) in others.
- Inclusion in a "senior civil guard of honour" at the 2004 opening of the Parliament of South Africa.
- In August 2017, the plain opposite the Christiaan Barnard Hospital in Cape Town was renamed from Salazar Plain to Hamilton Naki Square.

He died in Langa on 29 May 2005, aged 78, of "heart trouble."

== Controversy concerning participation in 1967 heart transplantation ==
After Naki's death, obituaries published 9 June 2005 to 2 July 2005 in at least two medical journals (The BMJ and The Lancet), one magazine (The Economist), two newspapers (The Independent and The New York Times), and an unknown number of newspapers publishing Associated Press stories, printed obituaries that made the following claims about Naki's participation in the world's first human-to-human heart transplantation:

- That Barnard had asked Groote Schuur Hospital for permission for Naki to be on the transplant team, and that permission was given in secret because of hospital rules and apartheid laws. Under apartheid, black health care providers could not have contact with white patients.
- That on 3 December 1967, Naki removed the heart of the deceased Denise Darvall, who was white, for transplantation into Louis Washkansky by Barnard. (A recent study suggests that Denise was not dead and her heart had to be arrested.)

Between 14 July 2005 and 3 September 2005, the five aforementioned periodicals and the Associated Press issued formal retractions of statements in their obituaries of Naki that claimed that he participated in the world's first human-to-human heart transplantation. The reasons given for the initial mistakes included:

- The Economist stated that its obituary was based on Naki's "own words in interviews," but that Naki's role "was gradually embellished in post-apartheid, black-ruled South Africa" and that Naki came to believe the story himself. Furthermore, the magazine reported that the University of Cape Town did not initially deny the story because it appeared "ridiculous."
- The author of the BMJ and The Independent obituaries wrote that she had "relied on secondary sources" such as The Economist.
- In an article published the same day as its correction, the New York Times concluded that reports that Naki was involved in the 1967 transplantation emerged "most prominently" in a 2003 article in The Guardian. The 2003 article mentioned that "a team led by Mr. Naki went to work, a 48-hour marathon" to remove the donor heart.
- The Associated Press cited a reliance on previous (1993 and 2003) Associated Press articles.

Evidence cited in 2005 that Naki was not present at the first transplant included:

- Surgeons at the hospital where the 1967 transplantation was performed "assured" The Economist that Naki "was nowhere near the operating theatre."
- The Economist reported that "a source close to" Naki said that Naki said that he had heard of the first heart transplant "on the radio."
- The chief of the laboratory in which Naki worked as of 1967 stated that Naki at the time was a scrub nurse and that Victor Pick was the surgical assistant; Naki became surgical assistant only after Pick died in the early 1970s and only "at the experimental surgical operating table."
- Hickman was quoted as saying that Naki "was an honest man and he wouldn't have made that claim [of being present at the 1967 transplanation]".
- Filmmaker Dirk de Villiers stated that he heard Naki "tell other people" that he assisted in the transplant but did not say this to de Villiers in private.
- David Dent, Acting Dean of the Faculty of Health Sciences at Cape Town University as of 2005, asserted that he worked with Naki "on transplanting pigs' livers" in 1967, but that technicians such as Naki did not perform surgeries in hospitals.
- In a letter to BMJ, Dent wrote that Naki "did not participate in the first heart transplant, did not ever operate on humans, nor ever work in Groote Schuur Hospital…. The suggestion that Hamilton Naki performed the donor operation was never mentioned in life by the man himself, by the department of cardiac surgery, or by the university in his citation for his honorary degree in 2003. It was not mentioned after his death at his family funeral, or at the memorial service in the medical school experimental laboratory."
- Chris Logan, author of a biography of Barnard, wrote that Naki "did not at any stage assist in the first or subsequent human heart transplant operations, nor could he have done under the apartheid laws at the time".
- It was effectively illegal for blacks to do surgery on whites under apartheid, and it is beyond the bounds of probability that an untrained black technician would have been permitted to undertake such an operation, or that his participation in such a high-profile operation at a leading white hospital could have avoided public notice during apartheid.

Instead, the surgeons who removed the heart from the donor were Marius Barnard (Christiaan Barnard's brother) and Terry O'Donovan.

Despite the retractions, the claim that Naki participated in the 1967 heart transplantation has been perpetuated in journal articles and books published after 2005. Examples include:

- "In December 1967… Naki, with amazing dexterity, removed the donor heart from Darval, irrigated it with electrolyte solution and passed it to Barnard."
- "1967 Dr. Christiaan N. Barnard of South Africa performed the world's first human heart transplant operation… Working with a team that included… black South African surgeon Hamilton Naki…."
- "One of the most interesting people I learned and read about was Hamilton Naki. He assisted Dr. Barnard with the first transplant in 1967…."

A 2007 book traced the origin of the incorrect story to a 1993 article in the Associated Press that stated "Barnard had Naki on his heart-transplant backup team. … When Barnard performed the first heart transplant in 1967, Naki was part of the backup team at Groote Schuur Hospital in Cape Town." The story's "blossom[ing] into accepted fact" was partly attributed to neither Barnard's nor Naki's taking steps to refute the story. The 2007 book noted that the 2005 corrections in the newsmedia "did not include any statement about adopting new procedures to prevent the same thing from happening again."

A documentary film Hidden Heart which was released widely in 2009 included interviews with Christiaan Barnard and Naki suggesting that Naki was present at the 1967 heart transplantation. Marius Barnard was quoted as describing the claims in the film that Naki removed the donor heart as "rubbish, a joke, it’s a total distortion of the facts" and as stating that Naki was at the time "in his bed, about 8 km away from Groote Schuur". The co-director of the film "acknowledge[d] that Naki was not present the night of the operation." A South African Broadcasting Corporation investigation after the release of the film quoted five people about the event:

- Tollie Lambrechts, a member of the transplantation team, said Naki "was definitely not in the operating room on that night."
- Dene Friedmann, a member of the transplantation team, said Naki "was not here that night, the only people here were the ones that would actually do the work. Hamilton never worked in the theatres. He wasn’t allowed to operate on a human being without a medical and surgical degree."
- Hickman said that Naki's being there was "highly unlikely."
- The former wife of Barnard stated that Barnard "never mentioned Naki was there the evening of the first transplant."
- Naki’s youngest son said that Naki was "the one who took out the heart and gave it to Chris Barnard." However, his son could not have been a witness to the operation, and was more likely to have heard the myth later.

The German surgeon Stefan von Sommoggy, who worked with Naki in South Africa for a year and, unlike many of his South African white colleagues, was on friendly terms with him, denied in a letter to the editor of the renowned German medical newspaper "Ärzteblatt" in response to Hidden Heart, saying that Naki's participation in the operation in any form could be ruled out for two reasons. Firstly, due to the colour of his skin but also due to his lack of medical qualifications, he was not able to access the surgical area. Secondly, Naki's technical skills were quite limited. Although he was able to show students how to transplant dog hearts, his crude technique due to the lack of medical training made it impossible for him to show the much more difficult pig heart transplant. Von Sommoggy referred to Naki as a friend who, under the circumstances of his life, could not be capable of such a feat. All the more he emphasized Naki's desire to be able to do something for the education of future generations, so that they would have the basics that are needed for such specialized activities.

== See also ==
- Vivien Thomas Black American heart surgeon
