= Philip Blaiberg =

South African dentist (1909–1969)

- Born: 24 May 1909; Uniondale, Cape Colony
- Died: 17 August 1969 (aged 60)

Philip Blaiberg (24 May 1909 – 17 August 1969) was a South African dentist and the third person to receive a heart transplant. On 2 January 1968, in Cape Town, Dr. Christiaan Barnard performed the third heart transplant in the world on the 59 year old Blaiberg (Dr. Adrian Kantrowitz performed the world's second heart transplant, on a baby in the US, three days after Dr. Barnard performed the first). Blaiberg survived the operation, and continued with his life for 19 months and 15 days before dying from heart complications on 17 August 1969. The success of Blaiberg's heart transplant furthered the progress made in regard to heart transplantation.

== Biography ==
Blaiberg was born in the small town of Uniondale in the Cape Colony, later the Cape Province. After completing his dentistry studies in London, Blaiberg returned to Cape Town and opened up his dentistry practice. In World War II, Blaiberg joined the South African Army Medical Corps and served in the dental unit in Ethiopia and Italy.

In 1954 at the age of 45, Blaiberg suffered his first heart attack. He subsequently closed his dental practice and retired to Cape Town. In March 1967, Blaiberg's heart failed, and it appeared that he was dying. The world's first human heart transplant operation was performed eight months later, on 3 December 1967. With the assistance of his brother Marius and 30 others, Dr. Christiaan Barnard performed the nine-hour operation on Louis Washkansky, a 55-year-old man suffering from diabetes and heart disease. With the transplanted heart from Denise Darvall, a victim of a road accident, Washkansky was able to survive the operation and lived for 18 days before dying of pneumonia. On 2 January 1968, Blaiberg became the second person to successfully undergo a heart transplant. Blaiberg received the heart from 24-year-old Clive Haupt, a coloured man who had collapsed on a Cape Town beach the day before. That the identity of the heart donor had been released led to much heated controversy in South Africa. In the times of the apartheid, there was heated debate about the racism that existed in the country. Some even went on to say:

The relief of suffering knows no colour bar... The heart is merely a blood-pumping machine and whether it comes from a white, black or coloured man - or a baboon or giraffe, for that matter - has no relevance to the issue of race relations in the political or ideological context. The question of colour is not at issue here.

Blaiberg had a smooth recovery after the successful heart transplant. Days after his operation, he was in good spirits, and had had no serious complications. The team of doctors led by Barnard were able to treat him for minor problems that occurred, and the doctors reduced his dosage of immunosuppressive drugs. Less than three months after the heart transplant operation, he was able to drive his car. Blaiberg was able to return to his normal lifestyle after the transplant, and as his wife said Philip "was running around like a machine".

In June 1968, Blaiberg contracted hepatitis while undergoing routine tests in South Africa's Groote Schuur Hospital. Emergency treatment kept him alive, but Blaiberg suffered some long-term complications from the transplant. He died of chronic organ rejection on 17 August 1969, aged sixty. Blaiberg's autopsy showed severe and widespread coronary artery disease, a precursor to atherosclerosis. Barnard said "eventually the chronic rejection had damaged the heart to such an extent that it failed." But he added, "I would like to point out to you that I don’t think we should be discouraged and throw up our arms and say that this is now the end, because we have now operated on five patients. And the total days of survival so far of these five patients has been 1,001 days. I think that gives you an average survival of 200 days."

He was the only one in first eight heart-transplant patients who survived a remarkable time (19 months). The success of Blaiberg's transplant led to an immediate increase in the number of doctors performing heart transplants globally. By the end of August 1968, 34 heart transplants had been performed, and by December 1968, 100 hearts had been transplanted into 98 patients.

== See also ==
- List of notable organ transplant donors and recipients
