= Mervyn Gotsman =

Cardiologist

Mervyn S. Gotsman
- מרבין גוצמן
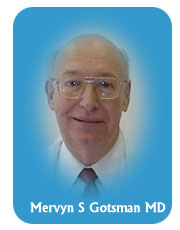
- Born: 1935 (age 90–91); Hermanus, Cape Province Union of South Africa
- Citizenship: Israeli
- Education: University of Cape Town
- Awards: Distinguished Citizen of Jerusalem
- Scientific career
- Fields: Cardiology
- Workplaces: Groote Schuur Hospital, Cape Town Hadassah Medical Center, Jerusalem

Mervyn S. Gotsman (Hebrew: מרבין גוצמן) is Professor Emeritus of Cardiology at the Hebrew University of Jerusalem and Hadassah Medical Center in Jerusalem, Israel.

== Biography ==
Mervyn Samuel Gotsman was born in 1935 in South Africa.

He graduated from the University of Cape Town with a degree in medicine. In 1959, following a relatively early death of his father, he worked as a general practitioner in a small mining town in Rhodesia.

He later completed his internships in cardiology in London and Birmingham, England. In 1964 he returned to South Africa and joined the cardiac clinic at the Groote Schuur Hospital in Cape Town. In 1967 he referred Louis Washkansky for the first successful heart transplant performed by Professor Christiaan Barnard.

In 1968 he was appointed the director of the Department of Cardiology in Durban, South Africa, and was appointed professor of medicine at the University of Natal. He served as the chief cardiologist of the former Natal Province.

In 1973, he immigrated to Israel with his family and served as the director of the Department of Cardiology at the Hadassah Medical Center in Ein Karem, Jerusalem, a position he held until his retirement in 2000. He served as the personal physician to Prime Minister Menachem Begin, and accompanied him on his trips overseas.

He received the Worthy Citizen of Jerusalem award in 2007 for his contribution to cardiology in Israel.
