= Grondin =

Grondin is a surname. Notable people with the surname include:

- Christophe Grondin (born 1983), naturalized Togolese football defender
- David Grondin (born 1980), French football player
- Gilles Grondin (1943–2005), Canadian politician
- Janvier Grondin (born 1947), Canadian politician
- Jean Grondin (born 1955), French-Canadian philosopher
- Marc-André Grondin (born 1984), Canadian actor
- Pierre Grondin (1925–2006), Canadian cardiac surgeon
- Willy Grondin (born 1974), football goalkeeper
