= Marius Barnard =

Marius Barnard may refer to:

- Marius Barnard (surgeon) (1927–2014), South African surgeon and politician
- Marius Barnard (tennis) (born 1969), South African tennis player
