= Boyd Rush =

American heart transplant recipient

Boyd Rusia Rush (Note: His name is listed as Rusia Rush in 1917, Boyd Rusia Rush in 1942 and Boyd Rush in 1964.) (July 4, 1895 – January 24, 1964) was an American upholsterer who was the recipient of the world's first heart transplant on January 24, 1964, at University of Mississippi Medical Center in Jackson, Mississippi. Boyd's doctor James D. Hardy used a chimpanzee heart since no human donor heart was readily available. This heart beat in Rush's chest for approximately one hour, and then failed. Rush died following the transplant without regaining consciousness.

== Biography ==
Rush was born on July 4, 1895, in Coldwater, Mississippi. During the U.S. draft for World War I, he was living in Enid, Mississippi and working as a day laborer. His physical build was listed as "stout."

In 1936, he married Mary Senora "Nora" Bridges. In 1942, he and his wife were living in Baton Rouge, Louisiana, where he was working at Jack's Cookie Company. He has also been described as a "deaf mute."

== Unsuccessful heart transplant ==
=== Background on organ transplants ===
James Hardy at the University of Mississippi Medical Center had previously performed the world's first transplant of a human lung in June 1963.

Being impressed by the limited success of Keith Reemtsma in transplanting chimpanzee kidneys into human patients, Hardy acquired four chimpanzees instead for the possibility of a heart transplant. He and the Medical School Dean Robert Marston jointly established conditions for a heart transplant which included that, since the procedure was highly experimental, they could only consider a patient close to death who had no other chance of survival.

=== Boyd Rush ===
On January 21, 1964, 68-year old Boyd Rush was transferred to the University of Mississippi Medical Center after being found in a comatose state two nights earlier. One lower leg was black with gangrene, his face was mottled with blood clots, and he only had a faint pulse. These symptoms were likely caused by his heart's inability to pump sufficient blood. Rush had had hypertensive heart disease for years and likely had suffered a heart attack before being found unconscious.

On Jan. 22, Hardy amputated the gangrenous portions of Rush's left leg.

On Jan. 23, it appeared as though Rush might receive the heart of a trauma victim in the hospital's ICU who was brain-dead and whose family had given permission for him to be a heart donor. However, at the time, the legal definition of death required the heartbeat to stop, and this trauma victim's heart was still beating. At approximately 11:00 pm, Rush went into shock and his blood pressure fell to 60, and Hardy took him into the operating room. Rush's heart stopped just before the team attached him to the heart-lung machine. Hardy then polled the other four doctors regarding whether they should continue with the transplant knowing that they would now use a chimpanzee heart and would likely receive much public criticism. He asked each doctor quietly, "Are you prepared to proceed?" The first doctor agreed, the next abstained, and the last two nodded their consent. The five doctors began the heart transplant using the largest of the four chimpanzees.

Just after 2:00 am CST in the morning on Friday, January 24, 1964, Hardy completed the stitching to connect the chimpanzee heart into Rush's chest and used a defibrillator to achieve a steady beat. This heart beat smoothly for a half hour, assisted by a pacemaker for the next half hour, but then could not be restarted even with cardiac massage. Rush died, never having regained consciousness.

Rush at the time was either living in Hattiesburg or in the Laurel Trailer Park on the outskirts of Jackson, Mississippi.

The operation started at approximately 11:00 pm on January 23, but the chimp heart was inserted into Rush's body at approximately 2:00 am. on Jan. 24, 1964.

=== Poor communication with relative ===
Mrs. J.H. Thompson, who was either his sister or stepsister was asked to sign the consent form which made no mention that an animal heart might be used. A 2012 article stated, "Such was the medicolegal situation at that time that this 'informed' consent was not considered in any way inadequate." Hardy later stated that he had verbally discussed the procedure in detail with relatives including the possibility that a chimpanzee heart might be used, although in fact Mrs. Thompson was the only relative present.

=== Hardy stops his work towards heart transplant ===
After this transplant attempt, the hospital's director of public information put out a guarded statement which included the phrase "the dimensions of the only available donor heart." The Associated Press assumed the donor heart was that of a human being and widely distributed the story. The hospital was thereby put in the position of issuing a correction, which embarrassed both the hospital and Hardy. He was further embarrassed at a medical convention two weeks later.

Hardy later wrote, "I had noted that when one loses his academic post, for whatever reason, he is not likely to get another one of comparable significance. I decided to wait until Shumway and his group transplanted a heart in man."

== First semi-successful heart transplant four years later by Christiaan Barnard ==
Almost four years after Hardy's attempt, Christiaan Barnard at Groote Schuur hospital in South Africa performed the world's first human-to-human heart transplant on December 3, 1967. The patient Louis Washkansky did regain consciousness, and lived for 18 days before dying of pneumonia. The donor heart was from 25 year-old Denise Darvall who had been rendered brain dead after she and her mother had been struck by a drunk driver. Her father gave permission for the transplant.
