= Dorothy Fischer =

South African heart transplant patient

- Born: 1931
- Died: 19 October 1981 (aged 49–50)
- Known for: Early heart transplant survivor

Dorothy Fischer (1931 – 19 October 1981) was a South African woman who was for many years the world's longest surviving heart transplant recipient.

Fischer's heart had been damaged by rheumatic fever as a child and by 1969, when she was 38 years old, her doctors agreed that she was dying. Dr Christiaan Barnard and his team carried out Fischer's heart transplant—their fifth—on 17 April 1969. She survived for twelve and a half years after the operation and was held up by Barnard as proof that heart transplants were a viable long-term option in spite of the body's rejection of foreign tissue.

Fischer died from complications associated with chronic rejection on 19 October 1981, two years before the immunosuppressive drug Ciclosporin became generally available to transplant patients.

== See also ==
- Christiaan Barnard
- Heart transplantation

== Bibliography ==
- Wallis, F. (2000). News Diary: facts and freaks over 1,000 years, Cape Town: Human & Rousseau.
