= Richard Lower (surgeon) =

American surgeon (1929–2008)

- Born: August 15, 1929; Detroit, Michigan
- Died: May 17, 2008 (aged 78); Twin Bridges, Montana
- Education: Amherst College, Cornell University
- Known for: Organ transplant Ciclosporin
- Scientific career
- Fields: Heart surgery
- Workplaces: Stanford University, Medical College of Virginia

Richard Rowland Lower (August 15, 1929 – May 17, 2008) was an American pioneer of cardiac surgery, particularly in the field of heart transplantation. Lower was born in Detroit, attended Amherst College, and received his medical degree from Cornell University in 1955. Lower and Norman Shumway developed many of the techniques required to conduct successful heart transplantation, including the use of hypothermia and the orthotopic technique, which became the standard technique for cardiac transplantation.

Initially experimenting on dogs, Lower and Shumway conducted their research at Stanford. Lower left Stanford to head the cardiac program at the Medical College of Virginia, and competed with Shumway, Adrian Kantrowitz, and Christiaan Barnard to conduct the first successful human heart transplant. The Americans (Lower, Shumway, and Kantrowitz) were delayed due to disagreements over the differences between cardiac death versus brain death. While a solution was being found to those questions, Barnard, making use of Shumway and Lower's research, conducted the first successful (i.e. not resulting in immediate death) human heart transplantation, in South Africa on December 3, 1967. Adrian Kantrowitz subsequently also conducted a transplant in New York City on December 6, 1967. Shumway performed his first human transplantation on January 6, 1968. Lower performed his first successful human transplantation in May of that same year.

Lower performed over 250 canine heart transplants, and over 800 in humans. He was sued for wrongful death of a donor, which held up his efforts, though he was later exonerated by courts. Lower subsequently developed the procedure of sending doctors to remote donor facilities, thus negating the previous requirement of transporting a donor's intact body to the same hospital as the recipient. He also pioneered the use of ciclosporin to prevent transplant rejection, and developed a biopsy technique to monitor rejection. Lower retired in 1989 to Montana, where he raised cattle, though he also volunteered at a Richmond, Virginia medical practice benefitting the poor. He died in 2008 of pancreatic cancer.
