= James Hardy (surgeon) =

American researcher, surgeon and author (1918–2003)

- Born: James D. Hardy; May 14, 1918; Newala, Alabama, U.S.
- Died: February 19, 2003 (aged 84); Mississippi, U.S.
- Education: University of Alabama, Tuscaloosa; University of Pennsylvania School of Medicine, Philadelphia
- Known for: First lung transplant in 1963 First overall and first animal-to-human heart transplant in 1964
- Spouse: Louise Scott Sams (m. 1949)
- Scientific career
- Workplaces: Stark General Hospital, Charleston; University of Tennessee, Memphis; University of Mississippi; American College of Surgeons

James D. Hardy (May 14, 1918 – February 19, 2003) was an American surgeon who performed the world's first lung transplant into John Russell, who lived 18 days. The transplant was performed at the University of Mississippi Medical Center in Jackson, Mississippi on June 11, 1963.

Hardy also attempted the world's first modern heart transplant when he transplanted the heart of a chimpanzee into comatose and dying Boyd Rush's chest during the early morning of January 24, 1964. This heart beat for approximately one hour, and then Rush died without regaining consciousness. The consent form did not disclose that a chimpanzee heart might be used, although Hardy stated that he had discussed this with Rush's stepsister. Before the transplant attempt, Hardy asked the four doctors who would be assisting him, to vote whether to proceed. One said yes, one abstained, and the last two nodded yes. This operation was also performed at the University of Mississippi Medical Center in Jackson. It was the world's first modern heart xenotransplant since Hardy used a chimp's heart.

== Early life ==
James Hardy grew up in Newala, Alabama, a small community in Shelby County. His father owned a lime plant in Newala. He studied at a high school in Montevallo before entering the University of Alabama for pre-medical curriculum. He received his MD in 1942 from University of Pennsylvania School of Medicine in Philadelphia. He held the office of the president of Alpha Omega Alpha during his senior year and his first scientific publication was on wound healings.

== Career ==
Hardy served in the U.S. Army Medical Corps in early 1944 during the Second World War. He first worked at Stark General Hospital, Charleston in South Carolina. Hardy began writing his first book, Surgery and the Endocrine System, in 1950 which was published two years later. He was awarded the Master of Medical Science in physiological chemistry by the University of Pennsylvania in 1951 for his research on using heavy water for measuring body fluids. He became the chair of surgery at the University of Mississippi School of Medicine, Jackson in 1955. He was also the first Professor of Surgery at the University of Mississippi School of Medicine.

Hardy wrote 24 books, 139 book chapters, 466 papers, and produced over 200 films. Vishnevsky Institute, Moscow honored him in 1971 for his pioneering work in organ transplantation and awarded him two medals for lung transplant and heart, respectively. He has served as President of the Society of University Surgeons, the Society of Surgical Chairmen, the Southern Surgical Association, the American College of Surgeons, the American Surgical Association and the International Society of Surgery.

Hardy also led the team responsible for performing a double-lung transplant that left the heart in place, in 1987.

=== First lung transplant (1963) ===
In April 1963, 58-year-old John Russell was admitted to the University of Mississippi Medical Center in Jackson, Mississippi, with recurrent pneumonia unresponsive to antibiotics. He also had emphysema of both lungs, squamous cell carcinoma of his left lung, and kidney disease. To complicate matters, Russell was a prisoner at the Mississippi State Penitentiary serving a life sentence for murder. One source states Russell was in prison for accidentally shooting and killing a 14-year-old boy. James Hardy wrote regarding this case, "Although the patient was serving a life sentence for a capital offense, there was no discussion with him regarding the possibility of a change in his prison sentence. However, authorities of the state government were contacted privately, and they indicated that a very favorable attitude might be adopted if the patient were to contribute to human progress in this way."

Prior to the surgery, Russell would awake at night coughing up bloody sputum until he was blue in the face. Every movement left him extremely short of breath, and he was scared of suffocating. Tests showed he only had one-third of normal lung capacity. When Hardy approached him about the potential transplant, Russell talked with his wife and three children. His main concern was whether the transplant would help improve his shortness of breath. Hardy told him that he thought it would.

Thoracic resident Martin Dalton sought and received permission from the family of a recently deceased heart attack patient to use their left lung. He used an endotracheal tube to keep the lungs ventilated and injected heparin into the heart to prevent clotting. When the time came, he removed the left lung and carried it to the adjacent operating room.

On June 11, 1963, when Hardy and his team opened Russell's chest to begin the transplant, they saw that his cancer had spread beyond the left lung. The transplant would not save his life, but it might give him better breathing. The team continued with the planned transplant. The cancerous left lung had shrunk, and so had space around it. The team made space for the new lung and changed a few of the planned vascular connections. Watts Webb assisted Hardy with the transplant.

Initially, the transplanted lung did provide Russell with better breathing, before kidney disease impacted him. Hardy used azathioprine, prednisone, and radiation to suppress his immune system. John Russell lived for another 18 days and then died of kidney failure. One source states that Russell died from a combination of cancer, infection, and kidney disease.

The book Second Wind: Oral Histories of Lung Transplant Survivors (2012) states that University of Mississippi Medical Center had unreliable blood banking, no intensive care unit, only limited 24-hour lab support, a weak anesthesia program, and most critically for Russell, no artificial kidney machine.

There is brief surviving film footage of the lung transplant. Martin McMullan participated in the operation as a surgical technician, and later became a doctor and a professor of surgery.

=== First heart transplant (1964) ===
At the University of Mississippi Medical Center in Jackson, Hardy transplanted the heart of a chimpanzee into the chest of a dying upholsterer, Boyd Rush, and shocked it with a defibrillator to resume beating at approximately 2:00 a.m. on Friday, January 24, 1964. This heart beat either 60 or 90 minutes (sources vary), and then Rush died without regaining consciousness. Since the operation had begun at approximately 11:00 p.m. on Jan. 23, 1964, some sources give that date. Hardy had been inspired by the limited success of Keith Reemtsma at Tulane University in Louisiana who in the early 1960s transplanted chimpanzee kidneys into thirteen human patients.

Rush, 68 years old and described as a "deaf mute", was referred to Hardy by a community hospital on Jan. 21, 1964. He had been found by neighbors in a comatose state with only a faint pulse. Rush's stepsister Mrs. J.H. Thompson signed a consent form which stated, "I agree to the insertion of a suitable heart transplant if such should be available at the time. I further understand that hundreds of heart transplants have been performed in laboratories throughout the world but that any heart transplant would represent the initial transplant in man." The consent form did not include the possibility that a chimpanzee heart might be used. Hardy later stated that he had verbally discussed the procedure in detail with relatives, although Mrs. Thompson was the only relative. A 2012 medical article stated, "Such was the medicolegal situation at that time that this 'informed' consent was not considered in any way inadequate."

Hardy had four chimpanzees he had previously purchased in order to have a back-up plan. There was also a trauma victim in the hospital's ICU who was brain-dead and whose family had given permission for him to be a heart donor. However, the legal definition of death at the time required that the heartbeat stop, and this trauma victim's heart still beat. Around 11:00 pm on Thursday, Jan. 23, Rush went into shock with low blood pressure, and Hardy took him into the operating room. Rush's heart stopped just before they attached him to the heart-lung machine. Hardy polled the other four doctors who were assisting him in the surgery, on whether they should continue with the transplant knowing that they would now use the heart of one of the chimpanzees and would likely receive substantial public criticism. The first doctor said yes, the next abstained, and the remaining two nodded yes. Just after 2:00 am in the early morning hours of Friday, Jan. 24, 1964, Hardy completed the stitching to connect the chimpanzee heart into Rush's chest. He used a defibrillator to start the donor heart beating. The chimpanzee heart beat in Rush's chest for approximately one hour and then could not be restarted.

The hospital's director of public information put out a guarded statement which included the vague phrase "the dimensions of the only available donor heart" and did not disclose that the donor heart came from a chimpanzee. The Associated Press story began: "Surgeons took the heart from a dead man, revived it and transplanted it into the chest of a man dying of heart failure today." At that point, the Mississippi Medical Center revealed the crucial detail that the donor heart had come from a chimpanzee. On Jan. 25, the New York Times printed a more accurate headline: "Chimpanzee Heart Used in Transplant to Human." Years later, Hardy stated, "The publicity, the outcry and the criticism were enormous. Public media reporters seemed to come out of the woodwork. We hunkered down and waited it out."

Several weeks later Hardy attended the Sixth International Transplantation Conference in New York City. Author Donald McRae of Every Second Counts (2006) wrote that the publicity surrounding the transplant had made Hardy's work "seem chaotic and even duplicitous" and that Hardy could feel the "icy disdain" from his fellow physicians. Hardy was introduced by Willem Kolff, the creator of the kidney machine, and toward the end of introduction Kolff turned to Hardy and quipped, "In Mississippi they keep the chimpanzees in one cage and the Negroes in another cage, don't they, Dr. Hardy?" Donald McRae wrote that the impact of this offhand remark on an already unsympathetic audience was profound, especially since the audience knew that Kolff had lived through the Nazi occupation of Holland. Kolff said later that he had merely been joking in an effort to lighten the mood. Hardy wrote, "For one of the few times in my professional career, I was taken aback and did poorly. The audience was palpably hostile. . . . . there was not a single hand of applause thereafter."

Hardy later wrote, "I had noted that when one loses his academic post, for whatever reason, he is not likely to get another one of comparable significance. I decided to wait until [Norm] Shumway and his group transplanted a heart in man." James Hardy thus withdrew from the race to perform the first successful heart transplant.

More than three and a half years later, the first heart transplant using a human heart was performed by Christiaan Barnard of South Africa on Dec. 3, 1967, with patient Louis Washkansky surviving for eighteen days.

== Personal life ==
Hardy married Louise Scott Sams of Decatur, Georgia in 1949. They met when he was working in Stark General Hospital in Charleston. She died from Alzheimer's disease in 2000. They had four daughters – Dr. Louise Roeska-Hardy, professor of philosophy in Heidelberg and Frankfurt, Germany, Dr. Julia Ann Hardy, psychiatrist in Michigan, Dr. Bettie Winn Hardy, clinical psychologist and director of the eating disorders program at the University of Texas Southwestern Medical School, Dallas and Dr. Katherine H. Little, medical director of the Diagnostic Center for Digestive Diseases at Baylor University Medical Center, Dallas.

== Retirement ==
Hardy retired from the Department of Surgery, University of Mississippi School of Medicine, Jackson, in 1987. He died at the age of 84 on February 19, 2003.

== Books ==
Hardy wrote an autobiography, The World of Surgery 1945–1985: Memoirs of One Participant, which was published in 1986. Apart from his autobiography, Hardy also wrote several other books including:

- Hardy's Textbook of Surgery
- Surgery and the Endocrine System
- The Academic Surgeon
