= Horace Edward Ramsden =

Recipient of the Victoria Cross

Horace Edward Ramsden VC
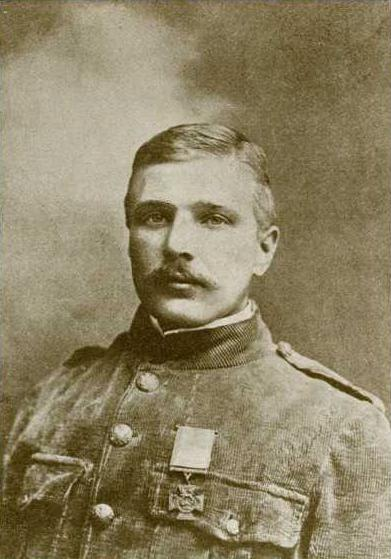
- Born: 15 December 1878; Chester, England
- Died: 3 August 1948 (aged 69); Wynberg, Cape Town, Union of South Africa
- Burial place: Maitland Crematorium, Maitland, Cape Town
- Military career
- Allegiance: United Kingdom; Union of South Africa
- Rank: Trooper
- Units: Protectorate Regiment
- Conflicts: Second Boer War; World War I
- Awards: Victoria Cross

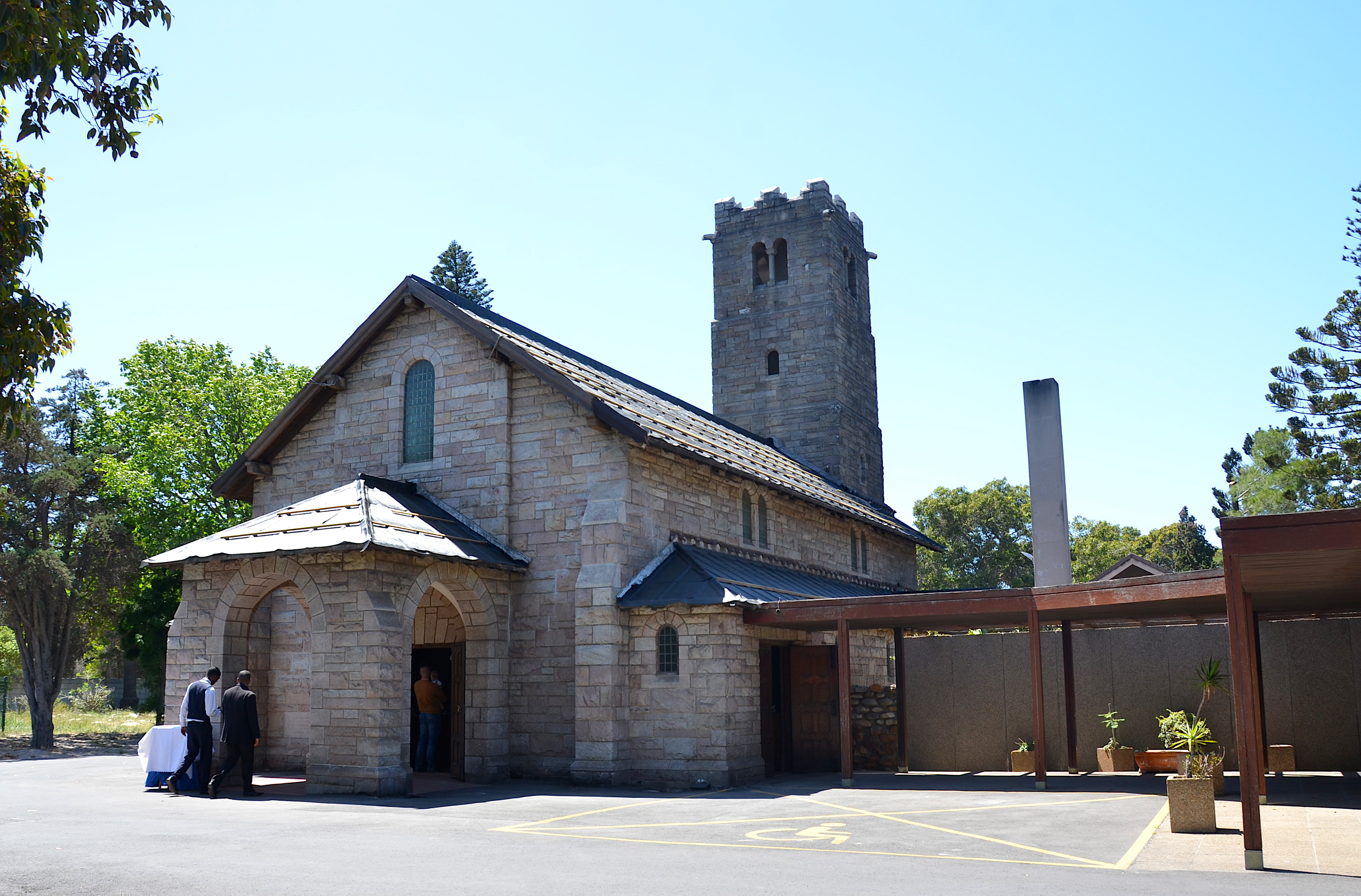
Maitland Crematorium, Maitland, Cape Town, where also Denise Darvall is buried

Horace Edward Ramsden VC (15 December 1878 – 3 August 1948) was an English and South African recipient of the Victoria Cross, the highest and most prestigious award for gallantry in the face of the enemy that can be awarded to British and Commonwealth forces. He was awarded the VC for saving his brother's life.

== Details ==
Ramsden was 21 years old, and a Trooper in the Protectorate Regiment (N.W. Cape Colony), South African Forces during the Second Boer War when the following deed took place near Mafeking for which he was awarded the VC:

On the 26th December, 1899, during the fight at Game Tree, near Mafeking, after the order to retire was given, Trooper H. E. Ramsden picked up his brother, Trooper A. E. Ramsden, who had been shot through both legs and was lying about 10 yards from the Boer trenches, and carried him about 600 or 800 yards under a heavy fire (putting him down from time to time for a rest) till they met some men who helped to carry him to a place of safety.

== Death ==
Ramsden died on 3 August 1948 at Wynberg, Cape Town, and was cremated at the Maitland Crematorium, Maitland, Cape Town.

== The medal ==
The medal was sold by auction in South Africa through Stephan Welz and Co. (incorporating Sotheby's) on 25 October 1999 and was purchased by Lord Ashcroft.
