= Marius Barnard (surgeon) =

South African cardiac surgeon (1927–2014)

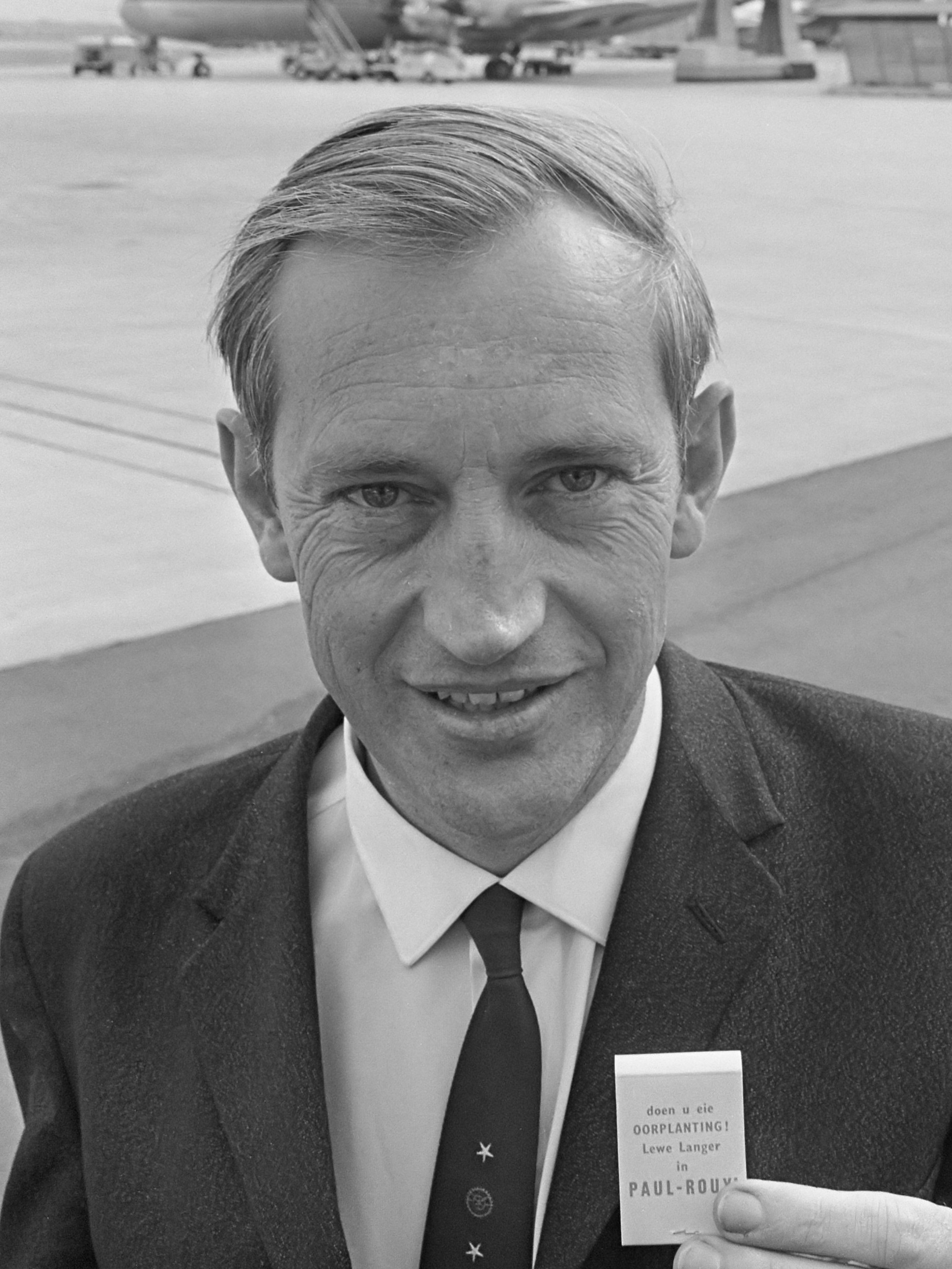
- Marius Barnard (1968)
- Born: Marius Stephanus Barnard; 3 November 1927; Beaufort West, Union of South Africa
- Died: 14 November 2014 (aged 87); Hermanus, South Africa
- Education: University of Cape Town
- Years active: 1950–2001
- Known for: Inventing critical illness insurance and political reforms
- Spouse: Inez
- Children: 3
- Relatives: Christiaan Barnard (brother)
- Medical career
- Profession: Surgeon
- Institutions: Groote Schuur Hospital
- Sub-specialties: Cardiothoracic surgery Heart transplantation

Marius Stephanus Barnard (3 November 1927 – 14 November 2014) was a South African cardiac surgeon and inventor of critical illness insurance.

Barnard was a member of the team headed by his brother Christiaan Barnard that performed the world's first human-to-human heart transplantation in 1967. Specifically, he was one of the surgeons who removed the heart from donor Denise Darvall at Groote Schuur Hospital. After a 2009 documentary film Hidden Heart suggested that Hamilton Naki removed the donor heart, Barnard was quoted as describing the film as "rubbish, a joke, it’s a total distortion of the facts" and as stating that Naki was at the time "in his bed, about 8 km away from Groote Schuur".

A recent study suggests that Denise was not in fact “brain-dead” in today's term, and, moreover, her heart was arrested with potassium injection, similarly to a non-voluntary active euthanasia. Furthermore, what makes the case even more problematic is that, based on the available data, Denise's prognosis was not unequivocal and the possibility of survival, even recovery, cannot be ruled out.

Barnard was motivated by the financial hardship he saw his patients suffer after he had treated their critical illnesses to convince the South African insurance companies to introduce a new type of insurance to cover critical illnesses. Barnard argued that, as a medical doctor, he can repair a man physically, but only insurers can repair a patient's finances. On 6 August 1983 the first critical illness insurance policy was launched.

Barnard was a member of the South African parliament between 1980 and 1989, for the Progressive Federal Party - one of the few political parties that opposed apartheid. He later acted as a technical consultant for Scottish Widows. Barnard received many awards for his contributions to medicine and humanity, and was voted in the top 25 most influential people in the field of health insurance and protection.

He died on 14 November 2014 after battling with prostate cancer.
