= Pierre Grondin =

Canadian cardiac surgeon (1925–2006)

- Born: August 18, 1925
- Died: January 17, 2006 (aged 80)
- Education: Doctor of Medicine degree, Université Laval, 1951. Specialist's certificate in cardiac surgery and a fellowship from the American College of Surgeons, San Francisco, 1960.
- Occupation: Cardiac surgeon
- Known for: One of the first doctors to perform a successful heart transplant.
- Awards: Recipient of the Prix Lenègre from the Foundation Nativelle

Pierre Grondin (August 18, 1925 – January 17, 2006), was a Canadian cardiac surgeon known for his contributions to heart transplantation and cardiac surgery. After completing postgraduate training with Michael DeBakey and Denton Cooley in Houston, Texas, Grondin introduced advanced techniques—such as open-heart surgery using the heart-lung machine and coronary artery bypass surgery—at the Montreal Heart Institute. In the early 1950s, he contributed to the development of open-heart surgery using the heart-lung machine. In May 1968, Grondin performed Canada's first successful heart transplant at the Montreal Heart Institute.

== Education and career ==
Grondin was awarded his Medical degree from the Université Laval in 1951, after which he went on to obtain a specialist's certificate in cardiac surgery and a fellowship from the American College of Surgeons in San Francisco in 1960. He began his career as a surgeon at the Hôpital Ste-Marie de Trois-Rivières. In 1971, he joined the Faculty of Medicine of the Université de Montréal as a clinical professor. After nearly 15 years as head of its surgical division, Grondin left the Montreal Heart Institute in 1978 to occupy the same position as head of cardiothoracic surgery at St. Francis Hospital in Miami Beach, Florida. He returned to Canada in 1990 to start a cardiac surgery program at the Hotel Dieu Hospital in Quebec City, and in 1995, at the age of 70, he retired.

== Achievements and later life ==
Grondin was one of the pioneers in cardiovascular and thoracic surgery in his field. In collaboration with other surgeons, he organized the surgery department at the Montreal Heart Institute. He acted as head of the surgery department from 1963 to 1975. During this time, he was appointed Honorary Professor of the Faculty of Medicine of Santo Domingo. He was also responsible for agreements between the Université de Montréal and its counterparts in Liège and Madrid. Grondin was the recipient of the Prix Lenègre from the Fondation Nativelle and the Order of Canada medal. In May 1968, at the Montreal Heart Institute, he performed the first successful heart transplant in Canada.

Grondin died in Shawinigan, Quebec, on January 17, 2006, of an esophageal rupture at the age of 80.

== See also ==
- Christiaan Barnard
