= Christiaan Barnard =

South African cardiac surgeon (1922–2001)

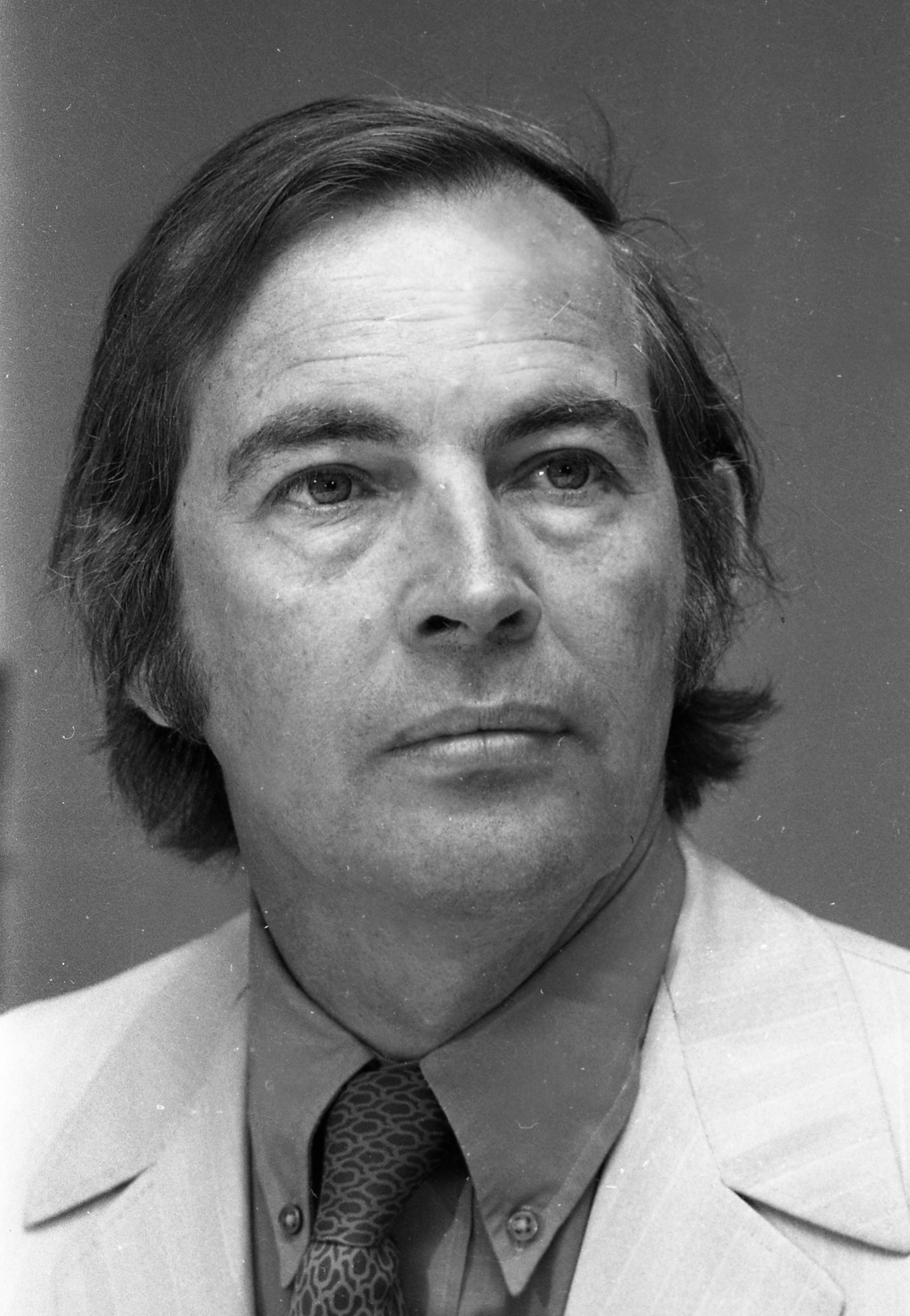
- Barnard in 1972
- Born: Christiaan Neethling Barnard; 8 November 1922; Beaufort West, Cape Province, Union of South Africa
- Died: 2 September 2001 (aged 78); Paphos, Cyprus
- Education: University of Cape Town
- Years active: 1950–2001
- Known for: First successful human-to-human heart transplant
- Spouses: Aletta Gertruida Louw (m. 1948; div. 1969); Barbara Zoellner (m. 1970; div. 1982); Karin Setzkorn (m. 1988; div. 2000)
- Children: 6
- Relatives: Marius Barnard (brother)
- Medical career
- Profession: Surgeon
- Institutions: Groote Schuur Hospital; University of Minnesota
- Sub-specialties: Cardiothoracic surgery; Heart transplantation

Christiaan Neethling Barnard (8 November 1922 – 2 September 2001) was a South African cardiac surgeon who performed the world's first human-to-human heart transplant operation. On 3 December 1967, Barnard transplanted the heart of accident victim Denise Darvall into the chest of 54-year-old Louis Washkansky, who regained full consciousness and was able to talk easily with his wife, before dying 18 days later of pneumonia, largely brought on by the anti-rejection drugs that suppressed his immune system. Barnard had told Mr. and Mrs. Washkansky that the operation had an 80% chance of success, an assessment which has been criticised as misleading. Barnard's second transplant patient, Philip Blaiberg, whose operation was performed at the beginning of 1968, returned home from the hospital and lived for a year and a half.

Born in Beaufort West, Cape Province, Barnard studied medicine and practised for several years in his native South Africa. As a young doctor experimenting on dogs, Barnard developed a remedy for the infant defect of intestinal atresia. His technique saved the lives of ten babies in Cape Town and was adopted by surgeons in Britain and the United States. In 1955, he travelled to the United States and was initially assigned further gastrointestinal work by Owen Harding Wangensteen at the University of Minnesota. He was introduced to the heart-lung machine, and Barnard was allowed to transfer to the service run by open heart surgery pioneer Walt Lillehei. Upon returning to South Africa in 1958, Barnard was appointed head of the Department of Experimental Surgery at the Groote Schuur Hospital, Cape Town.

He retired as head of the Department of Cardiothoracic Surgery in Cape Town in 1983 after rheumatoid arthritis in his hands ended his surgical career. He became interested in anti-aging research, and in 1986 his reputation suffered when he promoted Glycel, an expensive "anti-aging" skin cream, whose approval was withdrawn by the United States Food and Drug Administration soon thereafter. During his remaining years, he established the Christiaan Barnard Foundation, dedicated to helping underprivileged children throughout the world. He died in 2001 at the age of 78 after an asthma attack.

== Early life ==
Barnard was born on November 8, 1922 and grew up in Beaufort West, Cape Province, Union of South Africa. His father, Adam Barnard, was a minister in the Dutch Reformed Church. One of his four brothers, Abraham, was a "blue baby" who died of a heart problem at the age of three (Barnard would later guess that it was tetralogy of Fallot). The family also experienced the loss of a daughter who was stillborn and who had been the fraternal twin of Barnard's older brother Johannes, who was twelve years older than Christiaan. Barnard matriculated from the Beaufort West High School in 1940, and went to study medicine at the University of Cape Town Medical School, where he obtained his MB ChB in 1945.

His father served as a missionary to mixed-race people. His mother, Maria Elisabeth de Swart, instilled in the surviving brothers the belief that they could do anything they set their minds to.

== Career ==
Barnard did his internship and residency at the Groote Schuur Hospital in Cape Town, after which he worked as a general practitioner in Ceres, a rural town in the Cape Province. In 1951, he returned to Cape Town where he worked at the City Hospital as a Senior Resident Medical Officer, and in the Department of Medicine at Groote Schuur as a registrar. He completed his master's degree, receiving Master of Medicine in 1953 from the University of Cape Town. In the same year he obtained a doctorate in medicine (MD) from the same university for a dissertation titled "The treatment of tuberculous meningitis".

Soon after qualifying as a doctor, Barnard performed experiments on dogs while investigating intestinal atresia, congenital, life-threatening obstructions in the intestines. He followed a medical hunch that this was caused by inadequate blood flow to the fetus. After nine months and forty-three attempts, Barnard was able to reproduce this condition in a fetus puppy by tying off some of the blood supply to a puppy's intestines and then placing the animal back in the womb, after which it was born some two weeks later, with the condition of intestinal atresia. He was also able to cure the condition by removing the piece of intestine with inadequate blood supply. The mistake of previous surgeons had been attempting to reconnect ends of intestine which themselves still had inadequate blood supply. To be successful, it was typically necessary to remove between 15 and 20 centimeters of intestine (6 to 8 inches). Jannie Louw used this innovation in a clinical setting, and Barnard's method saved the lives of ten babies in Cape Town. This technique was also adapted by surgeons in Britain and the US. In addition, Barnard analyzed 259 cases of tubercular meningitis.

Owen Wangensteen at the University of Minnesota in the United States had been impressed by the work of Alan Thal, a young South African doctor working in Minnesota. Wangensteen asked the Groote Schuur Head of Medicine John Brock if he might recommend any similarly talented South Africans, and Brock recommended Barnard. In December 1955, Barnard travelled to Minneapolis, Minnesota to begin a two-year scholarship under Chief of Surgery Wangensteen, who assigned Barnard more work on the intestines, which Barnard accepted even though he wanted to move onto something new. Simply by luck, whenever Barnard needed a break from this work, he could wander across the hall and talk with Vince Gott who ran the lab for open-heart surgery pioneer Walt Lillehei. Gott had begun to develop a technique of running blood backwards through the veins of the heart so Lillehei could more easily operate on the aortic valve (McRae writes, "It was the type of inspired thinking that entranced Barnard"). In March 1956, Gott asked Barnard to help him run the heart-lung machine for an operation. Shortly thereafter, Wangensteen agreed to let Barnard switch to Lillehei's service. It was during this time that Barnard became acquainted with fellow future heart transplantation surgeon Norman Shumway. Barnard also became friendly with Gil Campbell, who had demonstrated that a dog's lung could be used to oxygenate blood during open-heart surgery. (The year before Barnard arrived, Lillehei and Campbell had used this procedure for twenty minutes during surgery on a 13-year-old boy with ventricular septal defect, and the boy had made a full recovery.) Barnard and Campbell met regularly for early breakfast. In 1958, Barnard received a Master of Science in Surgery for a thesis titled "The aortic valve – problems in the fabrication and testing of a prosthetic valve". The same year he was awarded a Ph.D. for his dissertation titled "The aetiology of congenital intestinal atresia". Barnard described the two years he spent in the United States as "the most fascinating time in my life."

Upon returning to South Africa in 1958, Barnard was appointed head of the Department of Experimental Surgery at Groote Schuur hospital, as well as holding a joint post at the University of Cape Town. He was promoted to full-time lecturer and Director of Surgical Research at the University of Cape Town. In 1960, he flew to Moscow in order to meet Vladimir Demikhov, a top expert on organ transplants (later he credited Demikhov's accomplishment saying that "if there is a father of heart and lung transplantation then Demikhov certainly deserves this title.") In 1961 he was appointed Head of the Division of Cardiothoracic Surgery at the teaching hospitals of the University of Cape Town. He rose to associate professor in the Department of Surgery at the University of Cape Town in 1962. Barnard's younger brother Marius, who also studied medicine, eventually became Barnard's right-hand man at the department of Cardiac Surgery. Over time, Barnard became known as a brilliant surgeon with many contributions to the treatment of cardiac diseases, such as the Tetralogy of Fallot and Ebstein's anomaly. He was promoted to Professor of Surgical Science in the Department of Surgery at the University of Cape Town in 1972. In 1981, Barnard became a founding member of the World Cultural Council. Among the recognition he received over the years, he was named Professor Emeritus in 1984.

== Historical context ==
Following the first-ever successful kidney transplant in 1953, in the United States, Barnard performed South Africa's second kidney transplant in October 1967, the first having been done in Johannesburg the previous year.

On 23 January 1964, James Hardy at the University of Mississippi Medical Center in Jackson, Mississippi, performed the world's first heart transplant and world's first cardiac xenotransplant by transplanting the heart of a chimpanzee into a desperately ill and dying man. This heart did beat in the patient's chest for approximately 60 to 90 minutes. The patient, Boyd Rush, died without regaining consciousness.

Barnard had experimentally transplanted forty-eight hearts into dogs, which was about a fifth the number that Adrian Kantrowitz had performed at Maimonides Medical Center in New York and about a sixth the number Norman Shumway had performed at Stanford University in California. Barnard had no dogs which had survived longer than ten days, unlike Kantrowitz and Shumway who had had dogs survive for more than a year.

With the availability of new breakthroughs introduced by several pioneers, also including Richard Lower at the Medical College of Virginia, several surgical teams were in a position to prepare for a human heart transplant. Barnard had a patient willing to undergo the procedure, but as with other surgeons, he needed a suitable donor.

During the Apartheid era in South Africa, non-white persons and citizens were not given equal opportunities in the medical professions. At Groote Schuur Hospital, Hamilton Naki was an informally taught surgeon. He started out as a gardener and cleaner. One day he was asked to help out with an experiment on a giraffe. From this modest beginning, Naki became principal lab technician and taught hundreds of surgeons, and assisted with Barnard's organ transplant program. Barnard said, "Hamilton Naki had better technical skills than I did. He was a better craftsman than me, especially when it came to stitching, and had very good hands in the theatre". A popular myth, propagated principally by a widely discredited documentary film called Hidden Heart and an erroneous newspaper article, maintains incorrectly that Naki was present during the Washkansky transplant.

== First human-to-human heart transplant ==
Barnard performed the world's first human-to-human heart transplant operation in the early morning hours of Sunday 3 December 1967. Louis Washkansky, a 54-year-old grocer who was suffering from diabetes and incurable heart disease, was the patient. Barnard was assisted by his brother Marius Barnard, as well as a team of thirty staff members. The operation lasted approximately five hours.

Barnard stated to Washkansky and his wife Ann Washkansky that the transplant had an 80% chance of success. This has been criticised by the ethicists Peter Singer and Helga Kuhse as making claims for chances of success to the patient and family which were "unfounded" and "misleading".

Barnard later wrote, "For a dying man it is not a difficult decision because he knows he is at the end. If a lion chases you to the bank of a river filled with crocodiles, you will leap into the water, convinced you have a chance to swim to the other side." The donor heart came from a young woman, Denise Darvall, who had been rendered brain dead in an accident on 2 December 1967, while crossing a street in Cape Town. On examination at Groote Schuur hospital, Darvall had two serious fractures in her skull, with no electrical activity in her brain detected, and no sign of pain when ice water was poured into her ear. Coert Venter and Bertie Bosman requested permission from Darvall's father for Denise's heart to be used in the transplant attempt. The afternoon before his first transplant, Barnard dozed at his home while listening to music. When he awoke, he decided to modify Shumway and Lower's technique. Instead of cutting straight across the back of the atrial chambers of the donor heart, he would avoid damage to the septum and instead cut two small holes for the venae cavae and pulmonary veins. Prior to the transplant, rather than wait for Darvall's heart to stop beating, at his brother Marius Barnard's urging, Christiaan had injected potassium into her heart to paralyse it and render her technically dead by the whole-body standard. Twenty years later, Marius Barnard recounted, "Chris stood there for a few moments, watching, then stood back and said, 'It works.'"

Washkansky survived the operation and lived for 18 days; he died from pneumonia, possibly due to the immunosuppressive drugs he was taking.

== Additional heart transplants ==
Barnard and his patient received worldwide publicity. A 2017 BBC retrospective article described the occasion as one where "Journalists and film crews flooded into Cape Town's Groote Schuur Hospital, soon making Barnard and Washkansky household names." Barnard himself was described as "charismatic" and "photogenic" while initial reports labeled the operation as "successful" despite the death of Washkansky 18 days later.

Worldwide, approximately 100 transplants were performed by various doctors during 1968. However, only a third of these patients lived longer than three months. Many medical centers stopped performing transplants. In fact, a US National Institutes of Health publication states, "Within several years, only Shumway's team at Stanford was attempting transplants."

Barnard's second transplant operation was conducted on 2 January 1968, and the patient, Philip Blaiberg, survived for 19 months. Blaiberg's heart was donated by Clive Haupt, a 24-year-old black man who suffered a stroke, inciting controversy (especially in the African-American press) during the time of South African apartheid. Dirk van Zyl, who received a new heart in 1971, was the longest-lived recipient, surviving over 23 years.

Between December 1967 and November 1974 at Groote Schuur Hospital in Cape Town, South Africa, ten heart transplants were performed, as well as a heart and lung transplant in 1971. Of these ten patients, four lived longer than 18 months, with two of these four becoming long-term survivors. One patient, Dorothy Fischer, lived for over thirteen years and another for over twenty-four years.

Full recovery of donor heart function often takes place over hours or days, during which time considerable damage can occur. Other deaths to patients can occur from preexisting conditions. For example, in pulmonary hypertension the patient's right ventricle has often adapted to the higher pressure over time and, although diseased and hypertrophied, is often capable of maintaining circulation to the lungs. Barnard designed the idea of the heterotopic (or "piggy back" transplant) in which the patient's diseased heart is left in place while the donor heart is added, essentially forming a "double heart". Barnard performed the first such heterotopic heart transplant in 1974.

From November 1974 through December 1983, 49 consecutive heterotopic heart transplants on 43 patients were performed at Groote Schuur. The survival rate for patients at one year was over 60%, as compared to less than 40% with standard transplants, and the survival rate at five years was over 36% as compared to less than 20% with standard transplants.

Many surgeons gave up cardiac transplantation due to poor results, often due to rejection of the transplanted heart by the patient's immune system. Barnard persisted until the advent of cyclosporine, an effective immunosuppressive drug, which helped revive the operation throughout the world. He also attempted xenotransplantation in two human patients, utilizing a baboon heart and chimpanzee heart, respectively.

== Public life ==
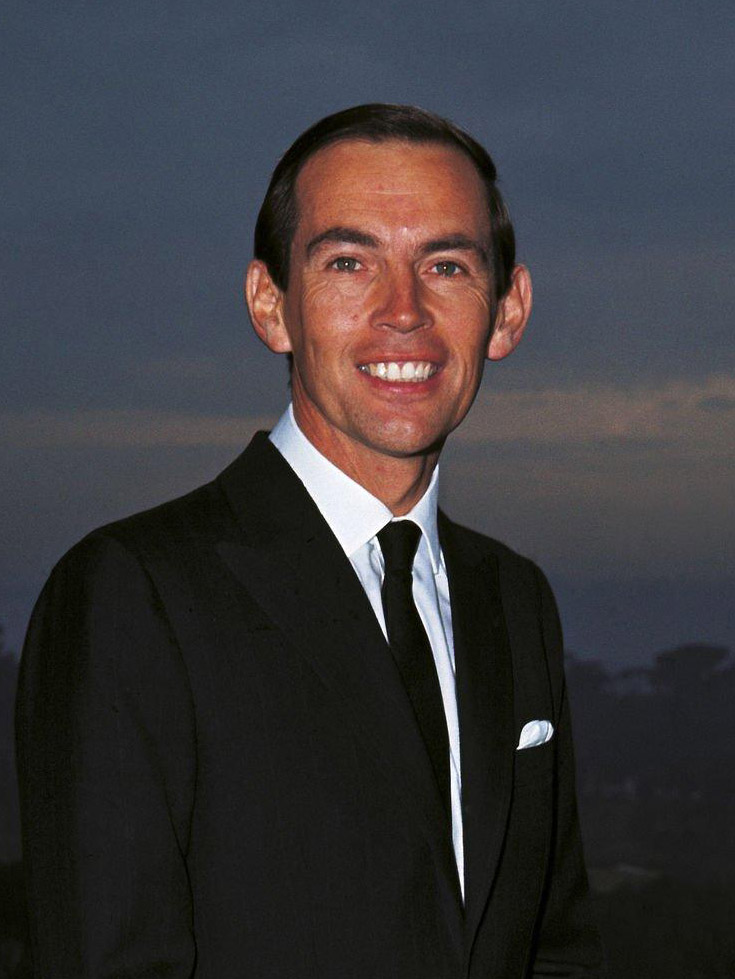
Barnard in 1968

Barnard was an outspoken opponent of South Africa's laws of apartheid, and was not afraid to criticise his nation's government, although he had to temper his remarks to some extent to travel abroad. Rather than leaving his homeland, he used his fame to campaign for a change in the law. Christiaan's brother, Marius Barnard, went into politics, and was elected to the legislature from the Progressive Federal Party. Barnard later stated that the reason he never won the Nobel Prize in Physiology or Medicine was probably because he was a "white South African".

Shortly before his visit to Kenya in 1978, the following was written about his views regarding race relations in South Africa; "While he believes in the participation of Africans in the political process of South Africa, he is opposed to a one-man-one-vote system in South Africa".

In answering a hypothetical question on how he would solve the race problem were he a "benevolent dictator in South Africa", Barnard stated the following in a long interview at the Weekly Review:

- While "I would abolish Social discrimination", political discrimination would continue.
- He favoured the total division of the country along racial lines. His words were; "I somehow feel ... but we may have to divide South Africa into two equal divisions". In a follow-up question about where the coloured people would end up in that scenario, he replied that 'I would include them in the white South Africa".
- That coloured people have "always been accepted" among whites.
- That "the black man will not accept this view" of universal suffrage.
- That "we are still out of the Olympic games" despite the fact that "in the field of sports where we have virtually integrated completely."
- Regarding the Soweto uprising, he claimed "there was ... a lot of external stirring up of turbulence". Regarding the anger from the black population when Steve Biko was murdered, he said that "I think that something like 50,000 came in from outside to work up feelings at that funeral."
- He stated that the National Party members were as upset about Biko's murder as were blacks; "The white community was thoroughly upset, let me tell you. The nationalists themselves were very upset."

The interview ended with the following summary from he himself; "I often say that, like King Lear, South Africa is a country more sinned against than sinning."

== Personal life ==
Barnard's first marriage was to Aletta Gertruida Louw, a nurse, whom he married in 1948 while practising medicine in Ceres. The couple had two children: Deirdre (born 1950) and Andre (1951–1984). International fame took a toll on his family, and in 1969, Barnard and his wife divorced. In 1970, he married heiress Barbara Zoellner (1950-1998) when she was 19, the same age as his son, and they had two children: Frederick (born 1972) and Christiaan Jr. (born 1974). He divorced Zoellner in 1982. Barnard married for a third time in 1988 to Karin Setzkorn, a young model. They also had two children, Armin (born 1989) and Lara (born 1997). This last marriage also ended in divorce in 2000.

Barnard described in his autobiography The Second Life a one-night extramarital affair with Italian film star Gina Lollobrigida, that occurred in January 1968. During that visit to Rome he received an audience from Pope Paul VI.

In October 2016, US Congresswoman Ann McLane Kuster stated that Barnard sexually assaulted her when she was 23 years old. According to Kuster, Barnard attempted to grope her under her skirt while she was seated at a business luncheon with US Representative Pete McCloskey, for whom she worked at the time.

== Retirement ==
Barnard retired as Head of the Department of Cardiothoracic Surgery in Cape Town in 1983 after developing rheumatoid arthritis in his hands which ended his surgical career. He had struggled with arthritis since 1956, when it was diagnosed during his postgraduate work in the United States. After retirement, he spent two years as the Scientist-In-Residence at the Oklahoma Transplantation Institute in the United States and as an acting consultant for various institutions.

He had by this time become very interested in anti-aging research, and his reputation suffered in 1986 when he promoted Glycel, an expensive "anti-aging" skin cream, whose approval was withdrawn by the United States Food and Drug Administration soon thereafter. He also spent time as a research advisor to the Clinique la Prairie, in Switzerland, where the controversial "rejuvenation therapy" was practised.

Barnard divided the remainder of his years between Austria, where he established the Christiaan Barnard Foundation, dedicated to helping underprivileged children throughout the world, and his game farm in Beaufort West, South Africa. In his later years, he had Basal-cell carcinoma (skin cancer) on his face, for which he was treated in Parow, South Africa.

== Death ==
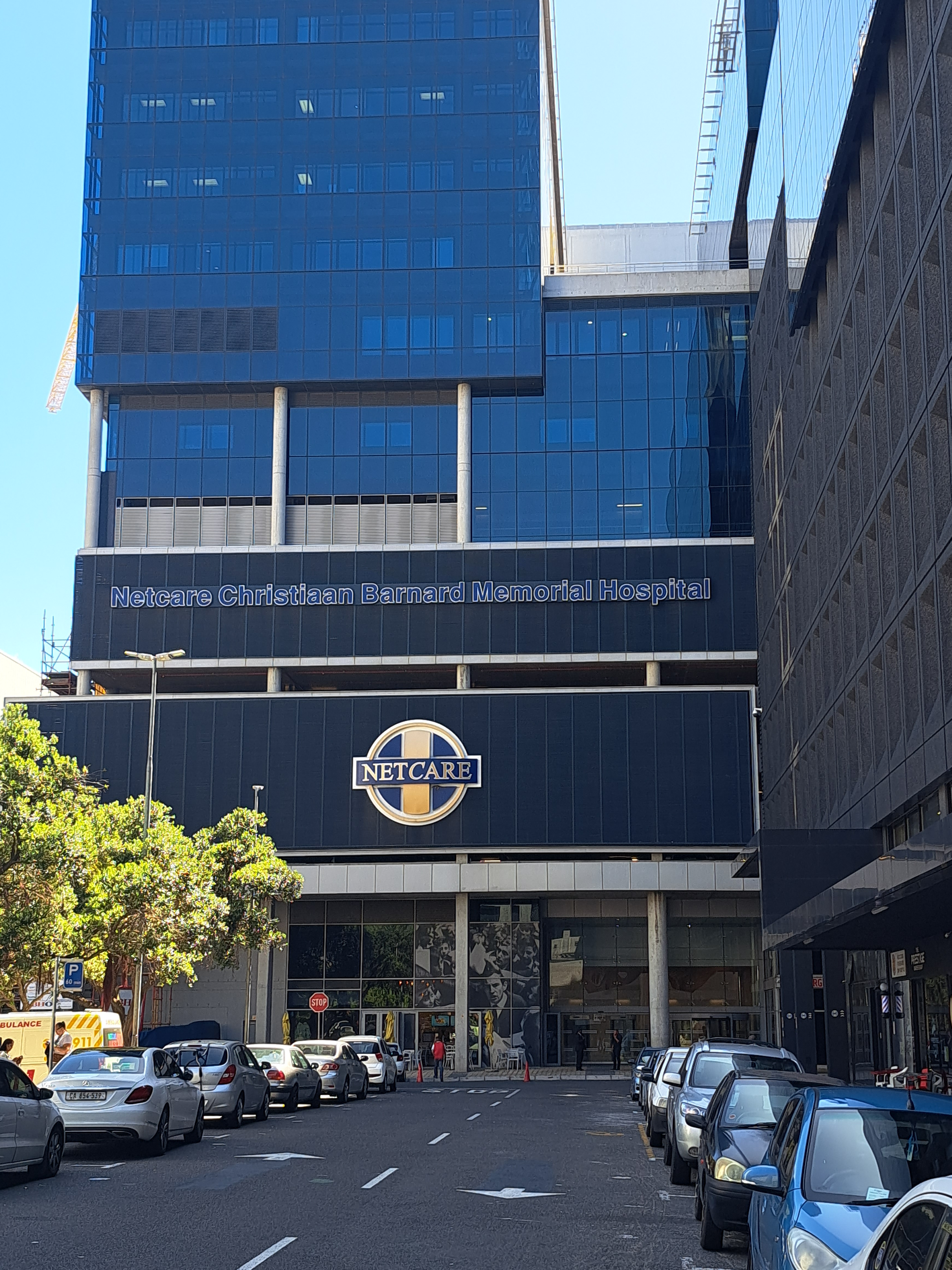
Netcare Christiaan Barnard Memorial Hospital in Cape Town

Christiaan Barnard died on 2 September 2001, while on holiday in Paphos, Cyprus. Early reports stated that he had died of a heart attack, but an autopsy showed his death was caused by a severe asthma attack.

== Books ==
Barnard wrote two autobiographies. His first book, One Life, was published in 1969 (ISBN 0245599525) and sold copies worldwide. Some of the proceeds were used to set up the Chris Barnard Fund for research into heart disease and heart transplants in Cape Town. His second autobiography, The Second Life, was published in 1993, eight years before his death (ISBN 0947461388).

Apart from his autobiographies, Barnard wrote books including:

- The Donor
- Your Healthy Heart
- In the Night Season
- The Best Medicine
- Arthritis Handbook: How to Live With Arthritis
- Good Life Good Death: A Doctor's Case for Euthanasia and Suicide
- South Africa: Sharp Dissection
- 50 Ways to a Healthy Heart
- Body Machine

== See also ==
- René Favaloro
- Bartley P. Griffith
- Pierre Grondin
- Hamilton Naki
- Geoffrey Tovey
