= Louis Washkansky =

First human heart transplantee (1912–1967)

- Born: 12 April 1912; Kovno, Kovno Governorate, Russian Empire
- Died: 21 December 1967 (aged 55); Cape Town, South Africa
- Known for: Recipient of the first Heart Transplant
- Spouse: Ann Sklar

Louis Joshua Washkansky (12 April 1912 – 21 December 1967) was a South African man who was the recipient of the world's first human-to-human heart transplant, and the first patient to regain consciousness following the operation. Washkansky lived for 18 days and was able to speak with his wife and reporters.

Washkansky was the second human recipient of a heart transplant overall, in that James Hardy had done a transplant in 1964 in which Boyd Rush received a chimpanzee's heart, although the patient in that case only survived an hour and did not regain consciousness.

== Biography ==
Washkansky was a Lithuanian Jew, the youngest of the four children of Abe Washkansky and his wife, Chana Yentel Kemelgor. In 1912, when Washkansky was three months old, his father emigrated to South Africa without his family and started a business as a produce merchant. As a result of World War I and its aftermath, Chana and the children were not able to re-unite with Abe in Cape Town until 1923. Washkansky attended Cape Town High School, where he passed the standard eight, before entering the grocery business in Cape Town. He saw active service in World War II in East and North Africa and Italy.

Washkansky was an avid sportsman. He took part in football, swimming, and weightlifting. Later on in life, he suffered heart problems and required a heart transplant.

== Medical background ==
Washkansky's health declined substantially: he was diabetic, and had an incurable heart disease, causing him to suffer three heart attacks. The last of these heart attacks led to congestive heart failure.

In April 1966, Washkansky visited Groote Schuur Hospital due to his pre-existing illness. He was first seen by Barry Kaplan, who in July 1966 had asked if Christiaan Barnard would be willing to treat Washkansky. Barnard had performed a number of laboratory tests and an in-depth examination on Washkansky and came to the conclusion that nothing could be done to help him. In January 1967, Washkansky was referred to Mervyn Gotsman, a cardiologist at the Cardiac Clinic in Groote Schuur Hospital, due to refractory heart failure. Washkansky underwent cardiac catheterisation confirming severe heart failure, and was subsequently referred to Barnard for possible surgery.

Washkansky was re-admitted to Groote Schuur on 14 September 1967, which was also the Jewish New Year. As a result of heart attacks in 1965, approximately only one third of his heart was still functioning. In late October, he went into a diabetic coma, but regained consciousness. Once, when he was swollen with fluid and in considerable pain, his wife Ann asked him in a whisper how he was doing. He managed a smile and whispered, "I'm on top of the world." He was also suffering from kidney and liver failure. On 10 November, Val Schrire put forward Washkansky as a possible heart transplant candidate.

When Barnard met with Washkansky, Barnard explained the possibility of a transplant and Washkansky was agreeable to the possibility. Afterwards, Ann found her husband Louis to be "oddly buoyant." When Barnard later explained the possibility of a transplant to both of them, the idea was so new that Ann initially worried her husband might absorb some of the personality of the donor heart. Barnard stated to Ann and Louis Washkansky that the proposed transplant had an 80% chance of success, which has been criticised as "misleading". Part of the pre-op procedure was to take swabs from Washkansky's skin, nose, mouth, throat, and rectum to find out what bacteria lived on and in his body, so that the most effective antibiotics could be given after the transplant. He was also frequently washed down with Phisohex.

== Potential transplant in November 1967 ==
In late November 1967, a potential donor was identified. A young black man had fallen off a truck and suffered a catastrophic head injury. Although the Chief of Cardiology, Val Schrire, had previously expressed a strong preference to avoid a "coloured" donor, police approached the young man's family for permission for him to be a heart donor. McRae writes that the family was "in shock after they were confronted by a policeman". The EKG of the donor heart, however, showed depressed ST segments, meaning that it might have been damaged or was not receiving enough oxygenated blood and gave the reluctant Val Schrire a medical reason not to continue with the transplant of a "coloured" donor heart in apartheid South Africa. Washkansky, who had been cleaned and shaved for the possible attempt, felt let down and disappointed when it did not go forward. He felt his future chances were slim.

== Operation and outcome ==
Washkansky received his heart transplant on 3 December 1967, at the Groote Schuur Hospital in Cape Town, South Africa. The operation lasted approximately six hours, beginning at 01:00, with Christiaan Barnard leading a team of thirty surgeons, anaesthetists, nurses and technicians. His brother Marius Barnard assisted with the surgery.

Denise Darvall, who was 25 years old, and her mother had been struck by a drunk driver while crossing a busy street on a Saturday afternoon. Her mother died at the scene. Denise was taken to Groote Schuur. Peter Rose-Innis, the hospital's senior neurosurgeon, attended to her. A skull X-ray showed two serious fractures. She showed no sign of pain when ice water was poured in her ear. In addition, her brain had no sign of electrical activity. A blood transfusion and respirator maintained the beat of her heart. Coert Venter and Bertie Bosman were the doctors who approached Denise's father Edward Darvall and asked for permission to use her heart for a possible transplant. He had been at the scene of the original accident and had been sedated after being brought to the hospital. As he waited, he thought they were still trying to save his daughter's life. Bosman told him there was a man in the hospital who was desperately ill and in need of a heart transplant, and perhaps Edward could do him a great kindness if they would allow them to transplant his Denise's heart. Bosman and Venter withdrew from the room, saying that he should take as long as needed to consider their request and that they would understand if he declined to give his consent.

In the four minutes Edward Darvall took to reach his decision he thought of his daughter, a birthday, and a gift she had given to him from a first salary. He began to cry and decided what needed to be done. He composed himself and summoned the doctors back to the small room. He told them that if they could not save his daughter, they must try to save this man.

Although Washkansky died of pneumonia eighteen days after the transplant because of a weakened immune system, Barnard regarded the surgery as a success because the heart was "not being stimulated by an electrical machine". As Barnard related in his book, One Life, a decision was made on the fifth postoperative day to bombard Washkansky's system with immunosuppressants to guard against a potential rejection of the new heart. As later heart transplants would reveal, the signs noted at that time were part of a resettling program for the new heart and not necessarily an indication of rejection.
