= Denise Darvall =

South African organ donor (1942–1967)

- Born: 27 February 1942
- Died: 3 December 1967 (aged 25); Cape Town, South Africa
- Known for: Donor in the world's first successful human heart transplant

Denise Darvall (27 February 1942 – 3 December 1967) was the donor in the world's first successful human heart transplant, performed at Groote Schuur Hospital, South Africa, by a team of surgeons led by Christiaan Barnard.

== Accident and death ==
=== Injuries ===
Denise Darvall was seriously injured in a car accident on Main Road in Observatory, Cape Town. She and her family were visiting friends for afternoon tea and went shopping for cake. She and her mother, Myrtle Ann Darvall, were run over by salesman and police reservist Frederick Prins, who failed to see them. This was due to a large truck that obscured his view of them, and their view of his car. Her mother died immediately. Denise Darvall sustained a skull fracture and severe head injuries after the car flung her across the road; her head hit the wheel cap of her car.

=== Father gives permission ===
Edward Darvall arranged for his fourteen-year-old son, who had witnessed the accident, to be taken away from the hospital. The 66-year-old Edward was also given a sedative, and he waited while doctors attempted to save his daughter. Two doctors, Coert Venter and Bertie Bosman, informed him that there was nothing further they could do for Denise. Bosman explained that there was a man in the hospital they might be able to help (Louis Washkansky), and asked Edward if he would consider allowing them to transplant Denise's heart.

Edward Darvall later said that, after thinking about his daughter for four minutes, he reached his decision and gave permission.

=== Declaration of death ===
Surgeons had a serious ethical problem because death then could only be declared by whole-body standards. The Harvard Criteria of brain death were not developed until 1968, nor were they adopted in South Africa or elsewhere for some years. The problem in this case was that, although Denise's brain was damaged, her heart was healthy. Various reports over the years attributed conflicting reasons for her heart stopping. In 2006, Marius Barnard told author Donald McRae that rather than wait for her heart to stop beating, his brother, Christiaan Barnard, who led the transplant team, had injected potassium into Denise's heart to paralyze it at Marius's urging. This rendered her technically dead by the whole-body standard. Marius Barnard later claimed he was lying when speaking to Mcrae. A recent study suggests that Denise was not in fact “brain-dead” in today's term. Therefore, since her heart was arrested artificially, the action resembles a non-voluntary active euthanasia.

=== Organ donation ===
After her father gave his consent, Darvall's heart was donated to Louis Washkansky. Her kidneys were given to 10-year-old Jonathan van Wyk. Due to apartheid, the kidney donation to Van Wyk was controversial because he was Black, while Denise was White. Washkansky lived 18 days before succumbing to pneumonia.

== Burial and trial ==
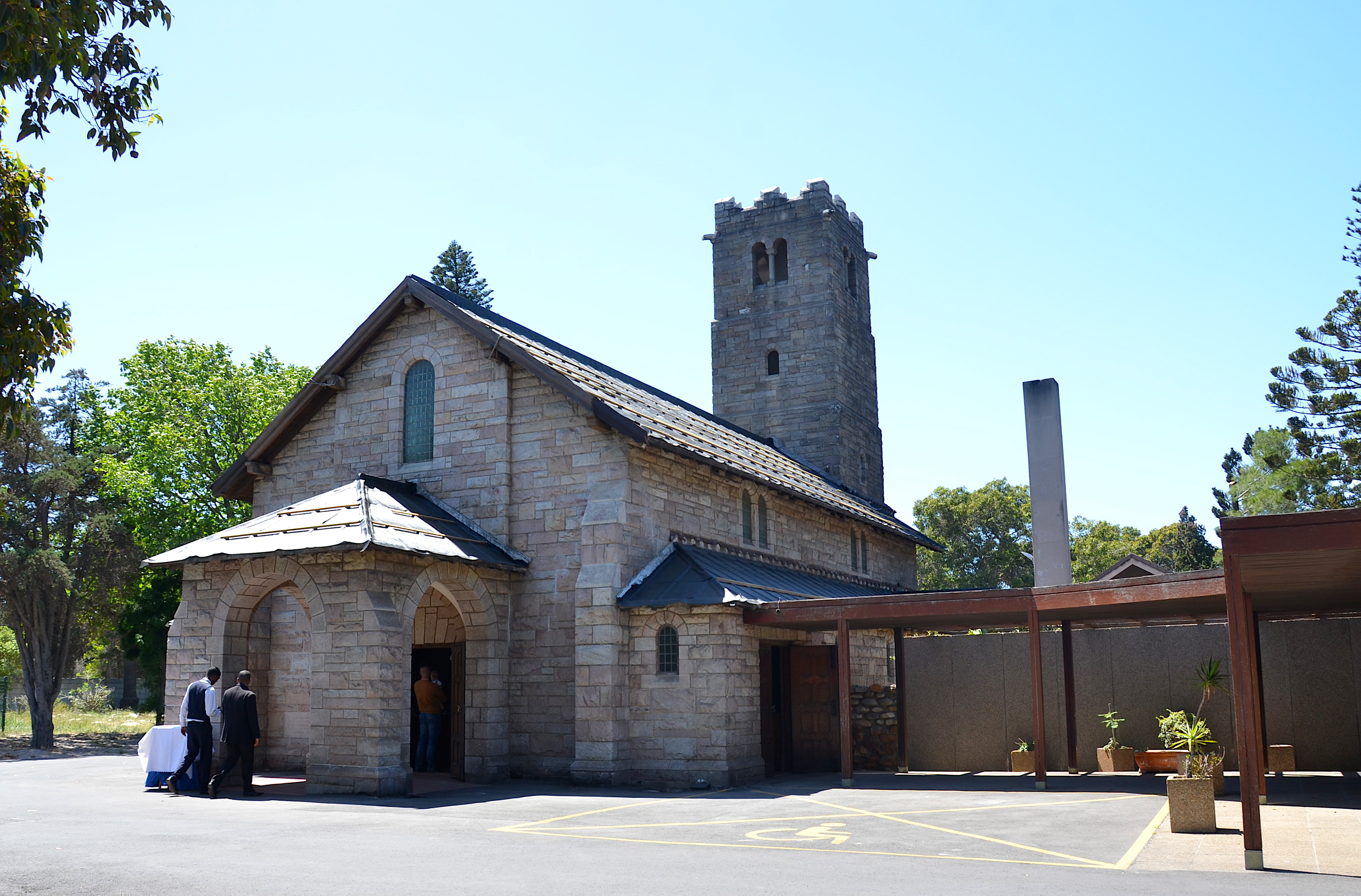
Maitland Crematorium, Maitland, Cape Town, where Horace Edward Ramsden is also buried

Edward Darvall arranged for his wife and daughter to be cremated at the Maitland Crematorium, Maitland, Cape Town. The joint ceremony took place on Wednesday, 6 December, and their ashes were later placed into a niche on site. Edward Darvall died in 1970 and was also cremated there.

Darvall was present at the trial of the drunk driver who was convicted of murder. He made a statement through a lawyer, asking the magistrate to show the "greatest possible mercy" to the driver. "The tragic death of his daughter was not meaningless, but benefited humanity," he said.

== Bibliography ==
- Christiaan Barnard and Curtiss Bill Pepper, "One Life," MacMillan, New York, 1969.
- Christiaan Barnard, "The Second Life," Vlaeberg Publishers, South Africa, 1993.
