= Heart transplantation =

Surgical transplant procedure

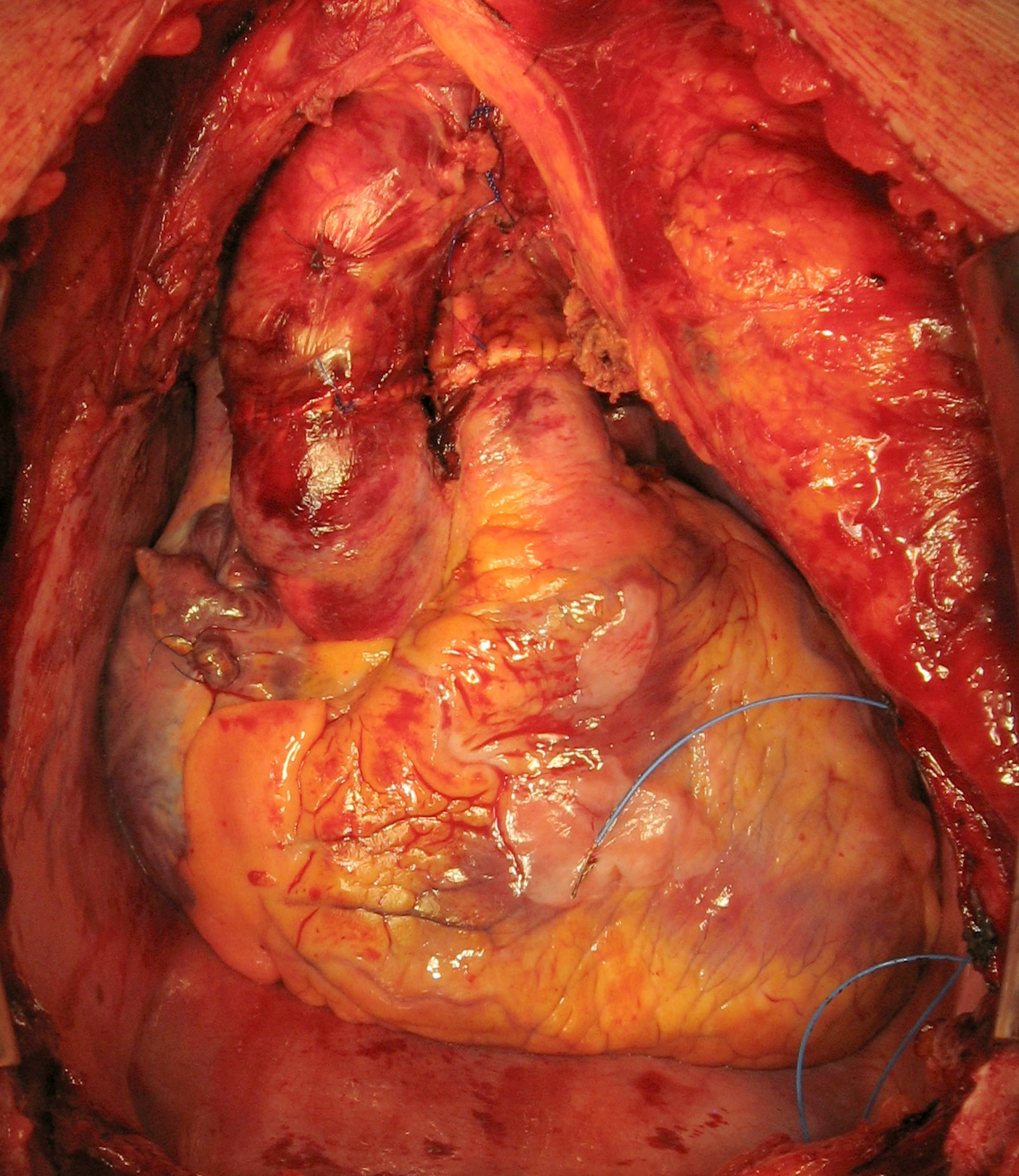
- A donor heart after being placed into the recipient in an orthotopic procedure.
- Specialty: Cardiology
- ICD-9-CM: 37.51
- MeSH: D016027
- MedlinePlus: 003003

A heart transplant, or a cardiac transplant, is a surgical transplant procedure performed on patients with end-stage heart failure when other medical or surgical treatments have failed. As of 2018, the most common procedure is to take a functioning heart from a recently deceased organ donor (brain death is the most common) and implant it into the patient. The patient's own heart is either removed and replaced with the donor heart (orthotopic procedure) or, much less commonly, the recipient's diseased heart is left in place to support the donor heart (heterotopic, or "piggyback", transplant procedure).

Approximately 5,000 heart transplants are performed each year worldwide, more than half of which are in the US. Post-operative survival periods average 15 years. Heart transplantation is not considered to be a cure for heart disease; rather it is a life-saving treatment intended to improve the quality and duration of life for a recipient.

== History ==
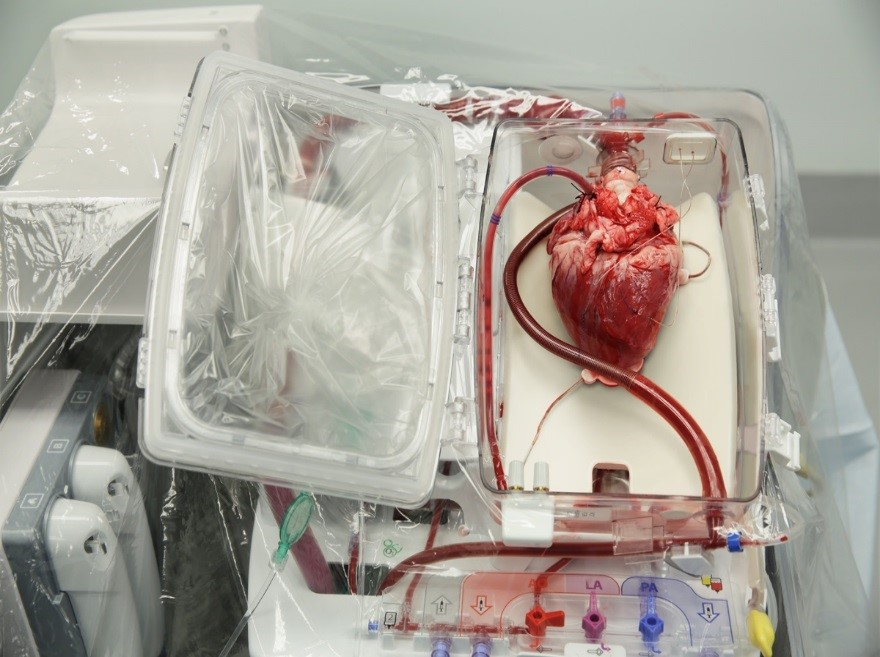
A beating heart awaiting transplant

American medical researcher Simon Flexner was one of the first people to mention the possibility of heart transplantation. In 1907, he wrote the paper "Tendencies in Pathology," in which he said that it would be possible one day by surgery to replace diseased human organs – including arteries, stomach, kidneys and heart.

Not having a human donor heart available, James D. Hardy of the University of Mississippi Medical Center transplanted the heart of a chimpanzee into the chest of dying Boyd Rush in the early morning of Jan. 24, 1964. Hardy used a defibrillator to shock the heart to restart beating. This heart did beat in Rush's chest for 60 to 90 minutes (sources differ), and then Rush died without regaining consciousness. Although Hardy was a respected surgeon who had performed the world's first human-to-human lung transplant a year earlier, author Donald McRae states that Hardy could feel the "icy disdain" from fellow surgeons at the Sixth International Transplantation Conference several weeks after this attempt with the chimpanzee heart. Hardy had been inspired by the limited success of Keith Reemtsma at Tulane University in transplanting chimpanzee kidneys into human patients with kidney failure. The consent form Hardy asked Rush's stepsister to sign did not include the possibility that a chimpanzee heart might be used, although Hardy stated that he did include this in verbal discussions. A xenotransplantation is the technical term for the transplant of an organ or tissue from one species to another.

Dr Dhaniram Baruah of Assam, India was the first heart surgeon to transplant a pig's heart in human body. However the recipient died subsequently. The world's first successful pig-to-human heart transplant was performed in January 2022 by surgeon Bartley P. Griffith at the University of Maryland Medical Center.

The world's first human-to-human heart transplant was performed by South African cardiac surgeon Christiaan Barnard utilizing the techniques developed by American surgeons Norman Shumway and Richard Lower. A recent study suggests that Denise Darvall, the 25 years old donor was not "brain-dead" in today's term, and, moreover, her heart was arrested artificially, similarly to a non-voluntary active euthanasia. Furthermore, what makes the case even more problematic is that, based on the available data, Denise's prognosis was not unequivocal and the possibility of survival, even recovery, cannot be ruled out. Patient Louis Washkansky received this transplant on December 3, 1967, at the Groote Schuur Hospital in Cape Town, South Africa. Washkansky, however, died 18 days later from pneumonia. There were no images documenting this historic moment.

On December 6, 1967, at Maimonides Hospital in Brooklyn, New York, Adrian Kantrowitz performed the world's first pediatric heart transplant. The infant's new heart stopped beating after 7 hours and could not be restarted. At a following press conference, Kantrowitz emphasized that he did not consider the operation a success.

Norman Shumway performed the first adult heart transplant in the United States on January 6, 1968, at the Stanford University Hospital. A team led by Donald Ross performed the first heart transplant in the United Kingdom on May 3, 1968. These were allotransplants, the technical term for a transplant from a non-genetically identical individual of the same species.

Worldwide, more than 100 transplants were performed by various doctors during 1968. Only a third of these patients lived longer than three months.

The next big breakthrough came in 1983 when cyclosporine entered widespread usage. This drug enabled much smaller amounts of corticosteroids to be used to prevent many cases of rejection (the "corticosteroid-sparing" effect of cyclosporine).

On June 9, 1984, "JP" Lovette IV of Denver, Colorado, became the world's first successful pediatric heart transplant recipient. Columbia-Presbyterian Medical Center surgeons transplanted the heart of 4-year-old John Nathan Ford of Harlem into 4-year-old JP a day after the Harlem child died of injuries received in a fall from a fire escape at his home. JP was born with multiple heart defects. The transplant was done by a surgical team led by Dr. Eric A. Rose, director of cardiac transplantation at New York–Presbyterian Hospital. Drs. Keith Reemtsma and Fred Bowman also were members of the team for the six-hour operation.

In 1988, the first "domino" heart transplant was performed, in which a patient in need of a lung transplant with a healthy heart would receive a heart-lung transplant, and their original heart would be transplanted into someone else.

Worldwide, about 5,000 heart transplants are performed annually, an increase of 53 percent between 2011 and 2022. The majority of these are performed in the United States (over half). Vanderbilt University Medical Center in Nashville, Tennessee currently is the largest volume heart transplant center in the world, completing 174 transplants in 2024, though this title changes frequently.

About 800,000 people have NYHA Class IV heart failure symptoms indicating advanced heart failure. The great disparity between the number of patients needing transplants and the number of procedures being performed spurred research into the transplantation of non-human hearts into humans after 1993. Xenografts from other species and artificial hearts are two less successful alternatives to allografts.

The ability of medical teams to perform transplants continues to expand. For example, Sri Lanka's first heart transplant was successfully performed at the Kandy General Hospital on July 7, 2017.

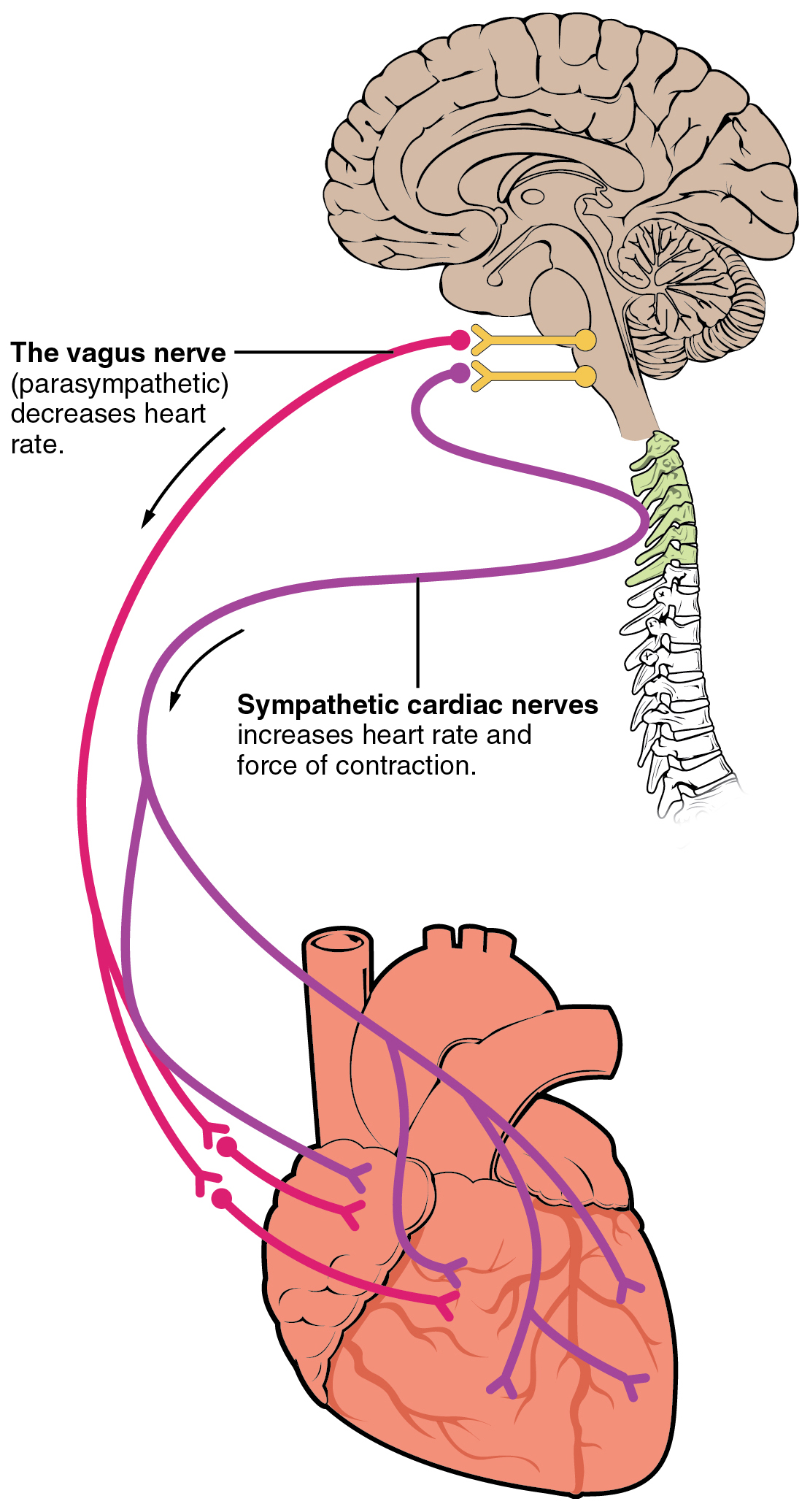
Autonomic innervation of the heart

During heart transplant, the vagus nerve is severed, thus removing parasympathetic influence over the myocardium. However, some limited return of sympathetic nerves has been demonstrated in humans.

Recently, Australian researchers found a way to give more time for a heart to survive prior to the transplant, almost double the time. Heart transplantation using donation after circulatory death (DCD) was recently adopted and can help in reducing waitlist time while increasing transplant rate. Critically ill patients that are unsuitable for heart transplantation can be rescued and optimized with mechanical circulatory support, and bridged successfully to heart transplantation afterwards with good outcomes.

On January 7, 2022, David Bennett, aged 57, of Maryland became the first person to receive a gene-edited pig heart in a transplant at the University of Maryland Medical Center. Before the transplant, David was unable to receive a human heart due to the patient's past conditions with heart failure and an irregular heartbeat, causing surgeons to use the pig heart that was genetically modified. Bennett died two months later at University of Maryland Medical Center on March 8, 2022. On April 19, 2023 Stanford Medicine surgeons performed the first beating-heart transplants from cardiac death donors.

== Contraindications ==
Some patients are less suitable for a heart transplant, especially if they have other circulatory conditions related to their heart condition. The following conditions in a patient increase the chances of complications.

Absolute contraindications:

- Irreversible kidney, lung, or liver disease
- Active cancer if it is likely to impact the survival of the patient
- Life-threatening diseases unrelated to the cause of heart failure, including acute infection or systemic disease such as systemic lupus erythematosus, sarcoidosis, or amyloidosis
- Vascular disease of the neck and leg arteries.
- High pulmonary vascular resistance – over 5 or 6 Wood units.

Relative contraindications:

- Insulin-dependent diabetes with severe organ dysfunction
- Recent thromboembolism such as stroke
- Severe obesity
- Age over 65 years (some variation between centers) – older patients are usually evaluated on an individual basis.
- Active substance use disorder, such as alcohol, recreational drugs or tobacco smoking (which increases the chance of lung disease)

Patients who are in need of a heart transplant but do not qualify may be candidates for an artificial heart or a left ventricular assist device (LVAD).

== Complications ==
Potential complications include:

- Post-operative complications include infection and sepsis. The surgery death rate was 5–10% in 2011.
- Acute or chronic graft rejection

- Cardiac allograft vasculopathy

- Atrial arrhythmia
- Lymphoproliferative malignancies, further worsened by immunosuppressive medication
- Increased risk of secondary infections due to immunosuppressive medication
- Serum sickness due to anti-thymocyte globulin
- Tricuspid valve regurgitation
- Repeated endomyocardial biopsy can cause bleeding and thrombosis

=== Rejection ===
Since the transplanted heart originates from another organism, the recipient's immune system will attempt to reject it regardless if the donor heart matches the recipient's blood type (unless if the donor is an isograft). Like other solid organ transplants, the risk of rejection never fully goes away, and the patient will be on immunosuppressive drugs for the rest of their life. Usage of these drugs may cause unwanted side effects, such as an increased likelihood of contracting secondary infections or develop certain types of cancer. Recipients can acquire kidney disease from a heart transplant due to the side effects of immunosuppressant medications. Many recent advances in reducing complications due to tissue rejection stem from mouse heart transplant procedures.

People who have had heart transplants are monitored in various ways to test for possible organ rejection.

A 2022 pilot study examining the acceptability and feasibility of using video directly observed therapy to increase medication adherence in adolescent heart transplant patients showed promising results of 90.1% medication adherence compared to 40-60% typically. Higher medication variability levels can lead to greater organ rejections and other poor outcomes.

== Prognosis ==
The prognosis for heart transplant patients following the orthotopic procedure has improved over time, and as of 2018 the survival rates were:

- 1 year: 91.5%
- 3 years: 85.9%
- 5 years: 80.3%

Recipients aged 65 years or older experience a more rapid decline in survival rate than younger recipients. Hispanic and Black recipients experience a more rapid decline in survival rate than white recipients.

In 2007, researchers from the Johns Hopkins University School of Medicine discovered that "men receiving female hearts had a 15% increase in the risk of adjusted cumulative mortality" over five years compared to men receiving male hearts. Survival rates for women did not significantly differ based on male or female donors.

== See also ==
- Artificial heart
- Biological pacemaker
- Xenotransplantation
