= Groote Schuur Hospital =

Teaching hospital in Cape Town, Western Cape, South Africa

- Western Cape Department of Health
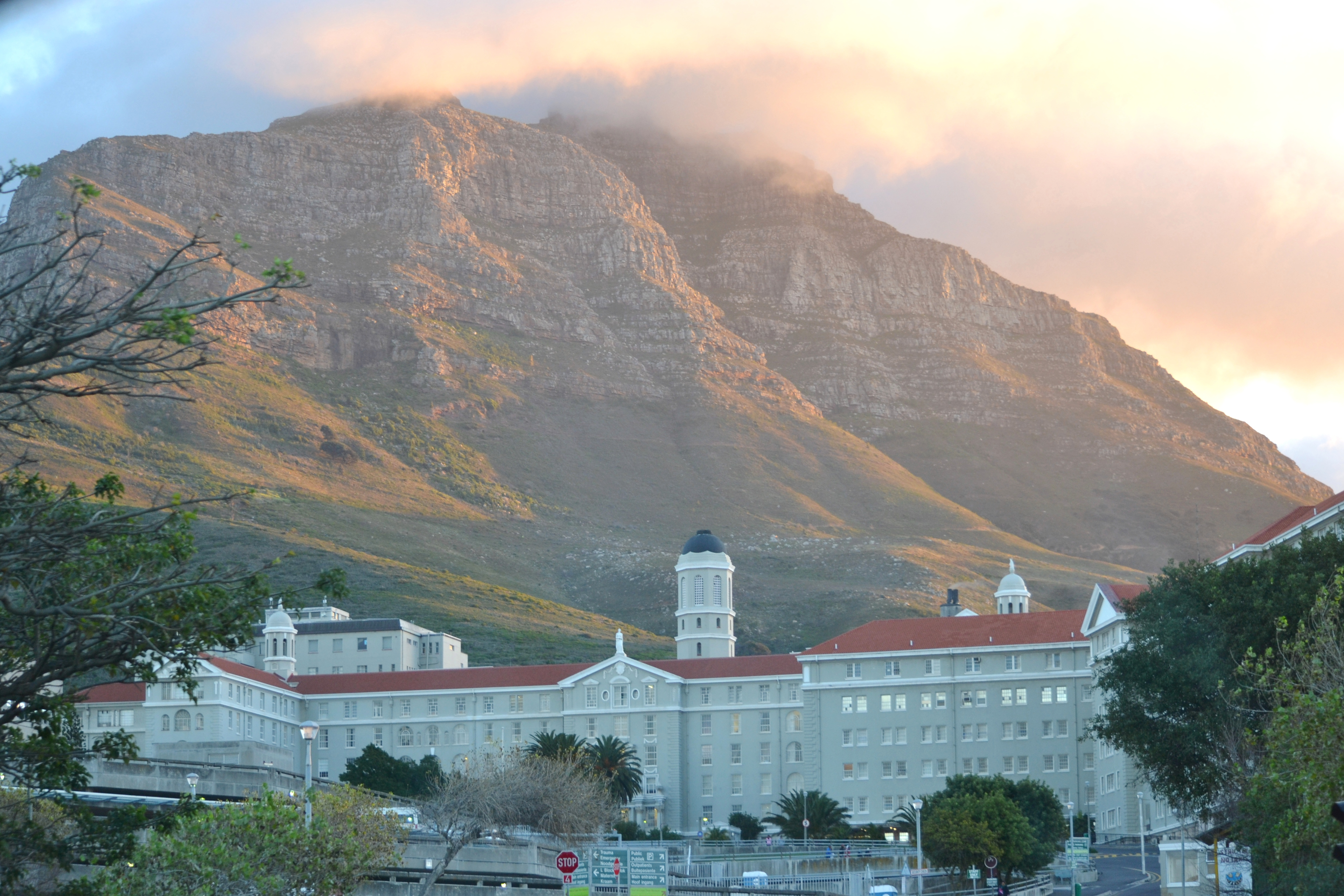
- Old Main Building of Groote Schuur Hospital

- Shown in Cape Town

Geography
- Location: Observatory, Cape Town, Western Cape, South Africa
- Coordinates: 33°56′29″S 18°27′46″E

Organisation
- Care system: Department of Health
- Type: District General, Teaching
- Affiliated university: University of Cape Town

Services
- Emergency department: Yes, Major Trauma Centre
- Beds: 893

History
- Founded: 1938

Links
- Website: www.westerncape.gov.za/gsh
- Lists: Hospitals in South Africa

Groote Schuur Hospital is a public teaching hospital situated on the slopes of Devil's Peak in the city of Cape Town, South Africa. It was founded in 1938 and is famous for being the institution where the first human-to-human heart transplant took place on the 3rd December 1967, conducted by surgeon Christiaan Barnard on the patient Louis Washkansky.

Groote Schuur is also the chief academic hospital of the University of Cape Town's medical school, providing tertiary care and instruction in all the major branches of medicine. The hospital underwent major extension in 1984 when two new wings were added. As such, the old main building now mainly houses several academic clinical departments as well as a museum about the first human heart transplant.

== History and facilities ==
Groote Schuur is Dutch for 'Great Barn' and is named after the original Groote Schuur estate laid out by Dutch settlers when the city of Cape Town was founded in the 17th century.

The hospital is known for its trauma unit, anaesthesiology and internal medicine departments. Groote Schuur attracts many visiting medical students, residents and specialists each year who come to gain experience in various fields. As December 2006, the hospital employed over 500 doctors, 1300 nurses and 250 allied health professionals.

The hospital was declared a Western Cape Provincial Heritage Site in 1996.

The N2 highway, merged with the M3 expressway, bends around the hospital and Table Mountain National Park on a massive uphill 10-lane highway. This intersection has been named Hospital Bend due to its proximity to the hospital.

The hospital is also known for being the hospital in which newborn Zephany Nurse was abducted from her family by a woman pretending to be a nurse.

== See also ==
- Heart of Cape Town Museum
