= Terence English =

South African-born British surgeon (1932–2025)

Sir Terence English KBE FRCS FRCP
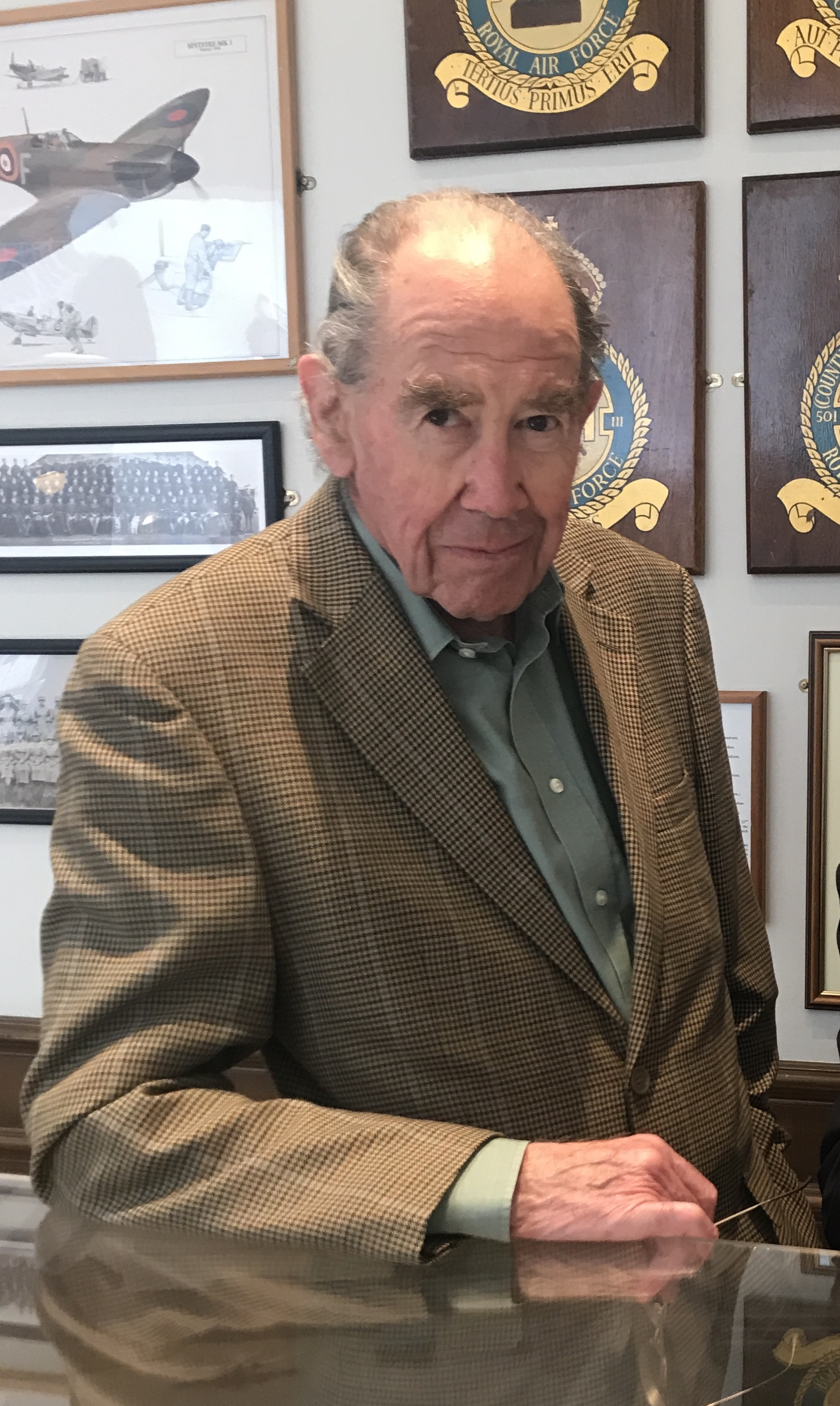
- English in 2017
- Born: Terence Alexander Hawthorne English; 3 October 1932; Pietermaritzburg, Natal, Union of South Africa
- Died: 23 November 2025 (aged 93); Iffley, Oxfordshire, England
- Education: Cordwalles Preparatory School; Hilton College; Witwatersrand University; Guy's Hospital Medical School
- Known for: Pioneering First Successful Heart Transplant Programme in UK; Cardiac Register UK
- Awards: Lifetime Achievement Award from Society for Cardiothoracic Surgery in GB and Ireland 2009; Lifetime Achievement Award from International Society for Heart and Lung Transplantation 2014; Ray C Fish Award for Scientific Achievement in Cardiovascular Disease from the Texas Heart Institute 2014.
- Medical career
- Profession: Cardiothoracic surgeon
- Field: Cardiothoracic surgery
- Institutions: Papworth Hospital, Cambridge
- Research: Cardiac transplantation
- Awards: Lifetime Achievement Award from Society for Cardiothoracic Surgery in GB and Ireland 2009; Lifetime Achievement Award from International Society for Heart and Lung Transplantation 2014; Ray C Fish Award for Scientific Achievement in Cardiovascular Disease from the Texas Heart Institute 2014.

Sir Terence Alexander Hawthorne English KBE FRCS FRCP (3 October 1932 – 23 November 2025) was a South African-born British cardiac surgeon. He was consultant cardiothoracic surgeon at Papworth Hospital and Addenbrooke's Hospital, Cambridge, 1973–1995. After starting a career in mining engineering, English switched to medicine and went on to lead the team that performed Britain's first successful heart transplant in August 1979 at Papworth, and soon established it as one of Europe's leading heart–lung transplant programmes. Professor John Wallwork subsequently developed the heart lung transplantation programme at Papworth.

English was born into a family of mixed Irish, Afrikaans, Yorkshire and Scottish descent. His father died at age 49, leaving his mother to bring up two children in South Africa. After completing a degree in Mining Engineering in Johannesburg, he was inspired by a maternal uncle, who was a surgeon, to study medicine, and with the financial aid of an unexpected legacy travelled to London. After completing his medical training at Guy's Hospital Medical School, he was stimulated by the pioneering open heart surgery taking place in the 1960s and he embarked on a career in cardiac surgery and then specialised in cardiac transplantation.

He became president of the Royal College of Surgeons 1989–92, Master of St Catharine's College 1993–2000, Deputy Lieutenant for Cambridgeshire 1994–2001 and president of the British Medical Association 1995–1996. A member of the General Medical Council (GMC) (1983–1989), he was also president of International Society of Heart and Lung Transplantation 1984–1985 and held multiple international honorary fellowships and Doctorates of medical colleges and universities. He was knighted a KBE in the 1991 New Years Honours List.

== Early life and education ==
Terence English was born on 3 October 1932 in Pietermaritzburg, South Africa, to Mavis and Arthur English. He had an older sister called Elizabeth. Arthur English died from silicosis when Sir Terence was two years old.

=== School ===
English went to Parktown Preparatory School for boys in Johannesburg and at the age of ten was sent to board at Cordwalles Preparatory School in Pietermaritzburg, and in 1946, completed his schooling at Hilton College in Natal.

=== Engineering and university, mining to medicine ===
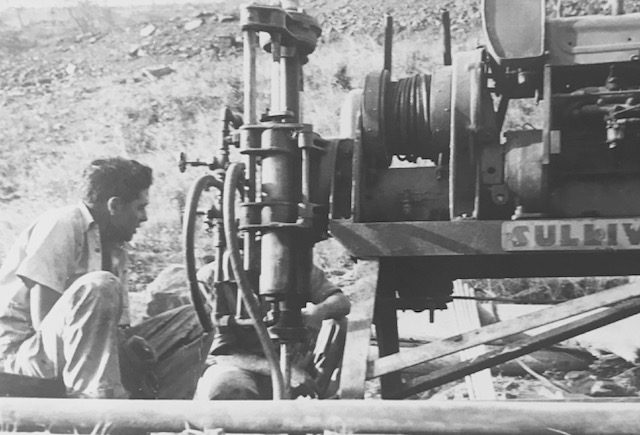
A young Terence English using a diamond drill on a dam in Southern Rhodesia

After leaving school at the age of seventeen, English worked for a year in what was then Southern Rhodesia (now Zimbabwe), as a diamond driller with the Cementation Company (Africa) Ltd on a dam near Salisbury (now Harare). This skill was useful in providing opportunities for summer jobs while he was studying for a BSc in mining engineering at Witwatersrand University in Johannesburg, which he completed in 1954.

His qualifications later provided opportunities for employment in mining exploration in Northern Quebec and Yukon.

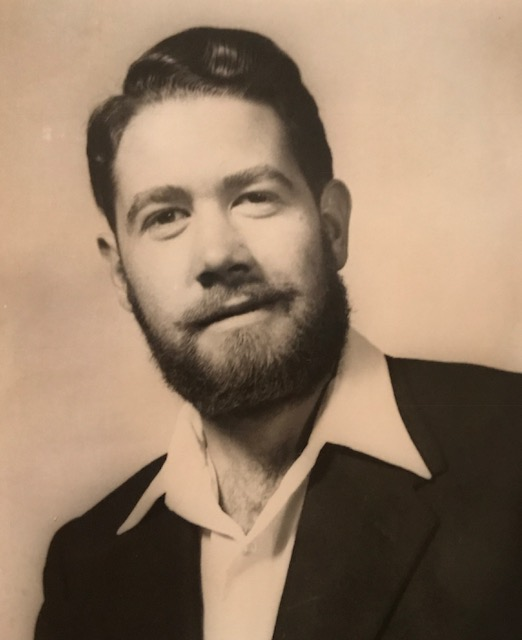
A 22 year old Terence English in 1955. Copy of original photograph.

=== Medical school ===
In his penultimate year of engineering, he unexpectedly inherited £2,000 from a family trust and decided this would enable him to change to medicine and spend his professional career as a doctor rather than an engineer. English applied to Guy's Medical School and was accepted by the Dean, George Houston providing he finished his engineering degree successfully. He did this and George Houston was later to play a key role in English's career when he agreed to readmit him after he had resigned during the 2nd year of his studies. Later, he was awarded an honorary fellowship of Guy's Hospital at the same time as Houston.

In 1961, English captained the Guy's 1st XV team when they won the Rugby Inter-Hospitals Cup.

== Surgical career ==
After completing medical school and internship, English started his surgical training with leading surgeons including Donald Ross and Sir Russell Brock. He also made a working visit with Christiaan Barnard at Groote Schuur Hospital in South Africa. After obtaining the FRCS in general surgery he completed his cardiothoracic training at the Royal Brompton Hospital, London Chest and National Heart Hospitals, with a year's research Fellowship with John Kirklin in Birmingham, Alabama.

=== Heart surgery and Papworth ===
English became consultant cardiothoracic surgeon to Papworth and Addenbrooke's Hospitals, 1972 – 1995.

A clinical moratorium on heart transplants in the UK was announced by Sir George Godber, Chief Medical Officer (United Kingdom) in February 1973. This was a result of poor results in most units around the world during the years following Christiaan Barnard's first transplant in December 1967 apart from Stanford University's in California where Norman Shumway had pioneered heart transplantation and Barnard's unit in Cape Town. It was felt at the time that cardiac transplantation required more research into the management of rejection, more donors and a change in public opinion. Three months after the moratorium on heart transplantation, English became inspired by a visit to his friend Philip Caves, at Stanford University, who had developed the technique of transvenous endomyocardial biopsy to detect acute organ rejection at an early stage, and was then Chief Resident in Shumway's unit. Caves had been working with pathologist Margaret Billingham, who devised the scoring system for early rejection. This advance and better knowledge of how to use drugs for immunosuppression had led to a significant improvement in results at Stanford and he decided that it was time for the UK to have its own programme of heart transplantation based on what he had seen there. So in October 1973 formal meetings began between surgical colleagues at Papworth and Sir Roy Calne at Addenbrooke's where there was already an active programme of kidney and liver transplantation. In preparation for this English did some open heart surgery at Addenbrooke's Hospital and also became involved with Roy Calne's pig heart transplant research.

Subsequently, English embarked on his own research at Huntingdon Research Centre directed towards defining the best way of preserving myocardial function during the period of anoxia between the heart's removal from the donor and its transplantation into the recipient. This comprised a combination of hypothermic, and pharmacological inhibition of metabolism and allowed safe periods of storage of the donor heart for up to 6 hours. By the end of 1977 English felt ready to embark on a clinical programme and submitted his plans to the Transplant Advisory Panel (TAP) of the Department of Health. He was received politely when the TAP met in January 1978 but was later informed that there was no funding for a heart transplant programme and they did not want to see any one-off operations. However, English managed to obtain permission from the Chairman of Cambridge Health Authority to use his facilities at Papworth for two transplants and after the first failed in January 1979, the second in August 1979 was successful and the patient Keith Castle lived for over five years. English carried on with developing the heart transplant programme and became Director of the British Heart Foundation Transplant Research Unit at Papworth (1980–1998).

In 2013, Eric Hunter's grandson acknowledged English in his tribute to his grandfather who had three consecutive heart transplants.

==== Factors in the transplant programme development ====
- The criteria for establishing brainstem death published by the UK Medical Royal Colleges and their Faculties in October 1976, allowed removal of a heart from a brain-dead donor.
- Improvements in donor heart preservation allowed for organs to be retrieved from hospitals far from Papworth.
- After 1983 there was a dramatic rise in the number of worldwide heart transplants, largely due to better control of acute rejection from the use of cyclosporin instead of azathioprine, steroids and anti-thymocyte globulin.
- Political opposition versus philanthropy. After failing to get funding from the Transplant Advisory Panel, English obtained support for the first two from the Area health Authority and then funding from the Cambridge millionaire David Robinson. Other sources followed until 1985 when the DoH provided secure funding for both transplant units at Papworth and Harefield Hospital.
- Concern amongst sectors of the medical profession and Michael Petch's withdrawal of cardiological support.
- Public view of medicine and surgery at the time.

==== The artificial heart ====
English performed the first total artificial heart transplant in the UK in November 1986. A Jarvic 7 heart was used as a bridge to transplantation until a human donor heart could be found and the patient subsequently survived nearly two years.

==== UK cardiac surgical register ====
English was involved with establishing the annual UK cardiac surgical register in 1978 which provided annual 30 day mortality statistics for all cardiac operations from every cardiac surgical unit in the UK and Ireland.

== Other roles ==
=== Member General Medical Council, GMC, (1983–1989) ===
Representing the Royal College of Surgeons, English served initially on the Preliminary Proceedings Committee of the GMC. Later, he became a member of the Education Committee the GMC and was involved in the debate on specialist certification.

=== President of the International Society for Heart Transplantation (1984–1985) ===
A founding member of the International Society for Heart Transplantation, English subsequently received the Society's Lifetime Achievement Award 2014.

=== President of Royal College of Surgeons (1989–1992) ===
In 1981, English was elected to the Royal College of Surgeons' Council, following which, in 1989, he became president.

Some of his achievements as President of RCS included:

- Re-establishing the College's international programme with visits to Thailand and Malaysia/Singapore and then Pakistan and India.
- Playing a key role in avoiding a split between the BMA and the colleges.
- Being responsible for presidents of the surgical specialist associations becoming invited members of the RCS Council.
- Implementing the "English Clause" during the 1991 New Deal for Junior Doctors Hours. This allowed surgical trainees to work beyond the stipulated 72 hours providing this was voluntary and they were not under pressure to do this. It worked well until abolished by the DoH 6 years later.
- Involvement in the NHS Reform Bill and resistance to managerial bureaucracy.
- Insisted on including the BMA in the Clinical Services Advisory Group (CSAG). Proposals to radically reform the NHS by the Conservative government in 1990 had planned to exclude the BMA. English played a key role by refusing to co-operate with the CSAG unless the Joint Consultants Committee chairman, Tony Grabham was a member.

=== President of the British Medical Association (1995–1996) ===
English publicly supported the extended role of nurses.

=== Master of St Catharine's College Cambridge (1993–2000) ===
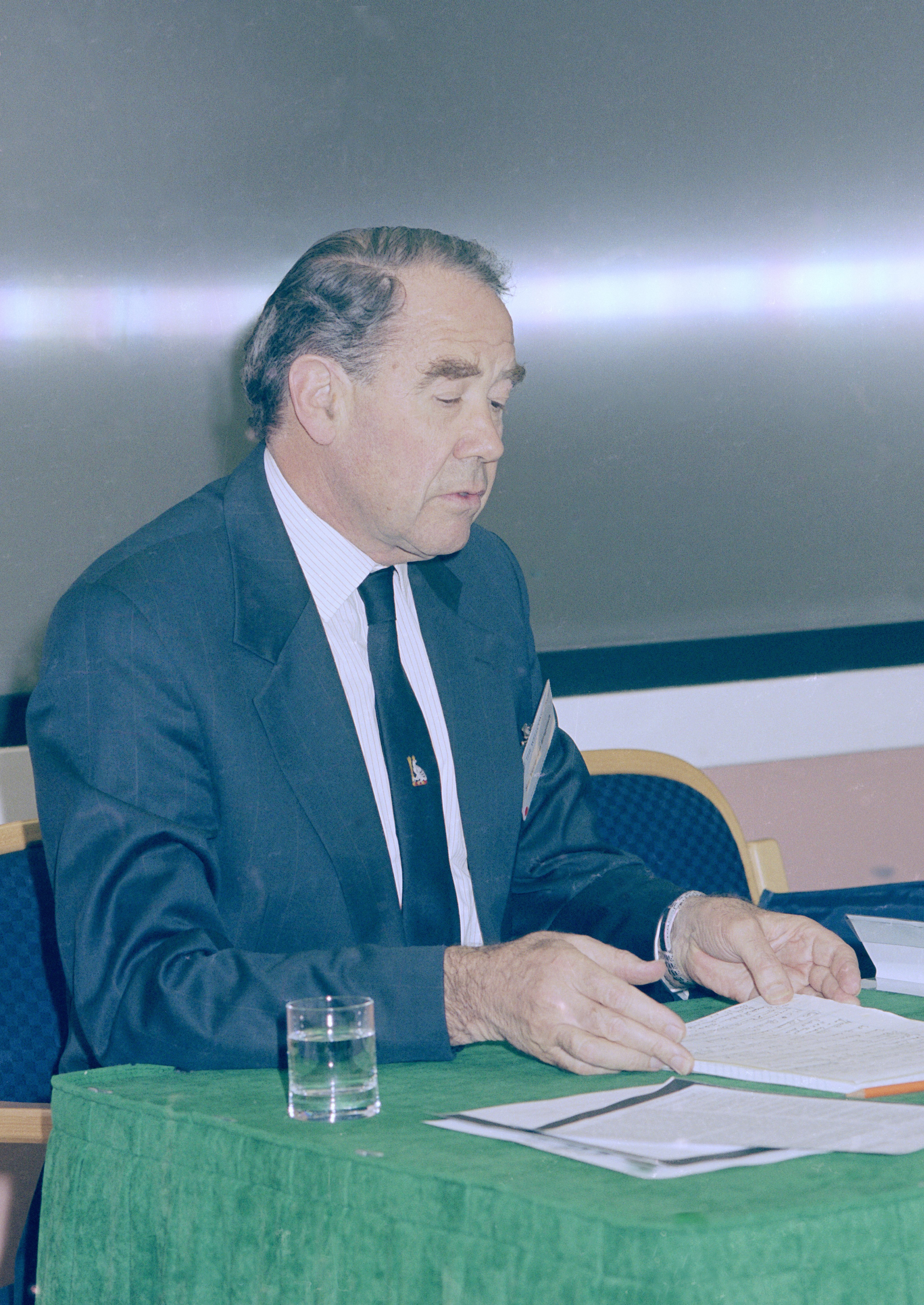
English in 1997

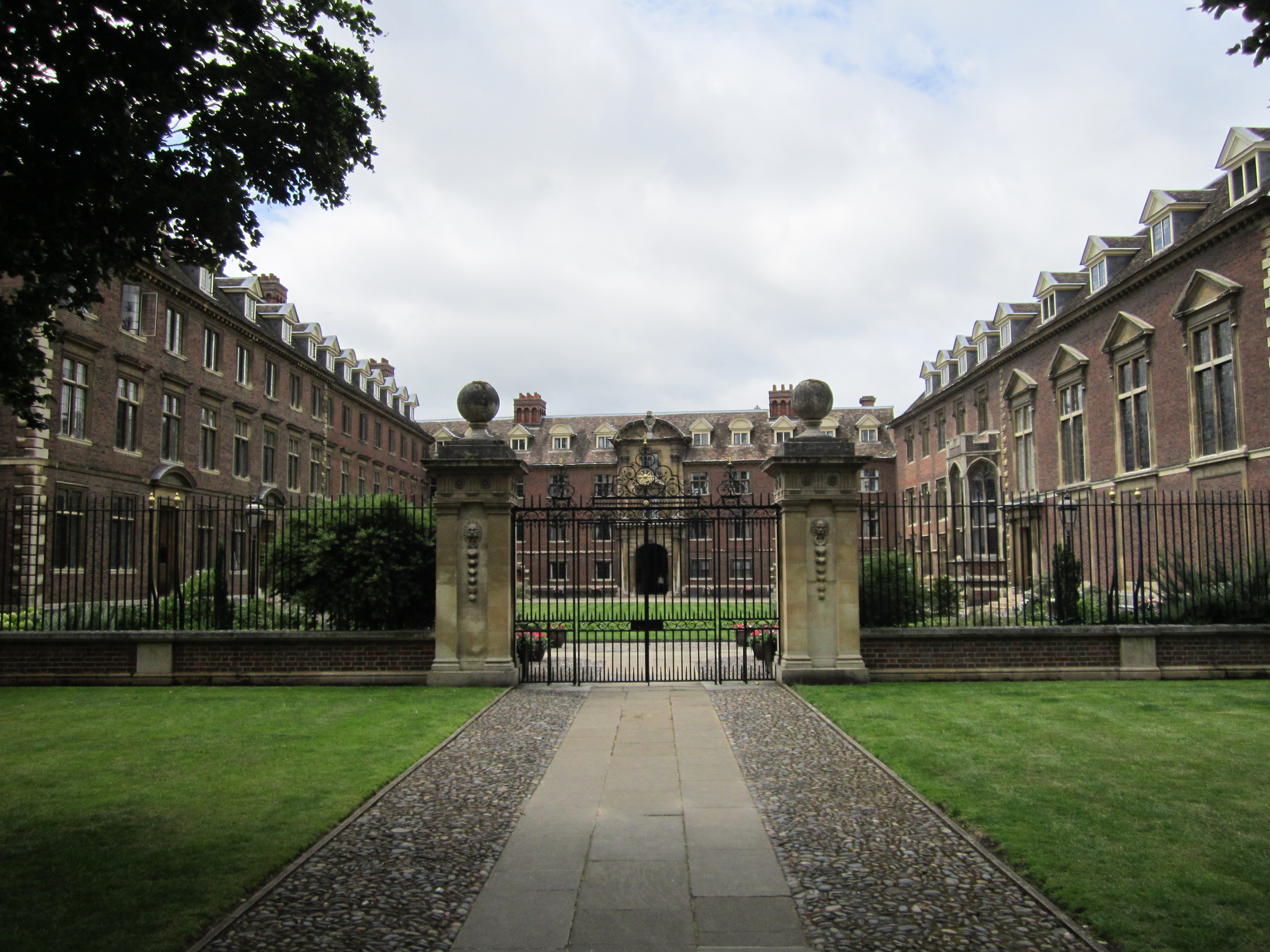
St Catharine’s College Cambridge

Elected master of St Catharine's College, where English spent seven years. In his farewell speech he expressed admiration for the wide educational and social background of the students and their hard work and range of extra-curricular activities. He also regretted the increasing bureaucracy of performance assessment exercises that the academic staff were being subjected to.

=== Trustee of the Hunterian Museum (1994–) ===
English was an elected trustee of the Hunterian Museum in London beginning in 1994. English also became a Member of the Audit Commission 1993–1998, Chief Medical Advisor to Bupa 1992–1999, Deputy Lieutenant, Cambridgeshire 1994–2001 and a Member of Council, Winston Churchill Memorial Trust 1995–2009.

== Retirement ==
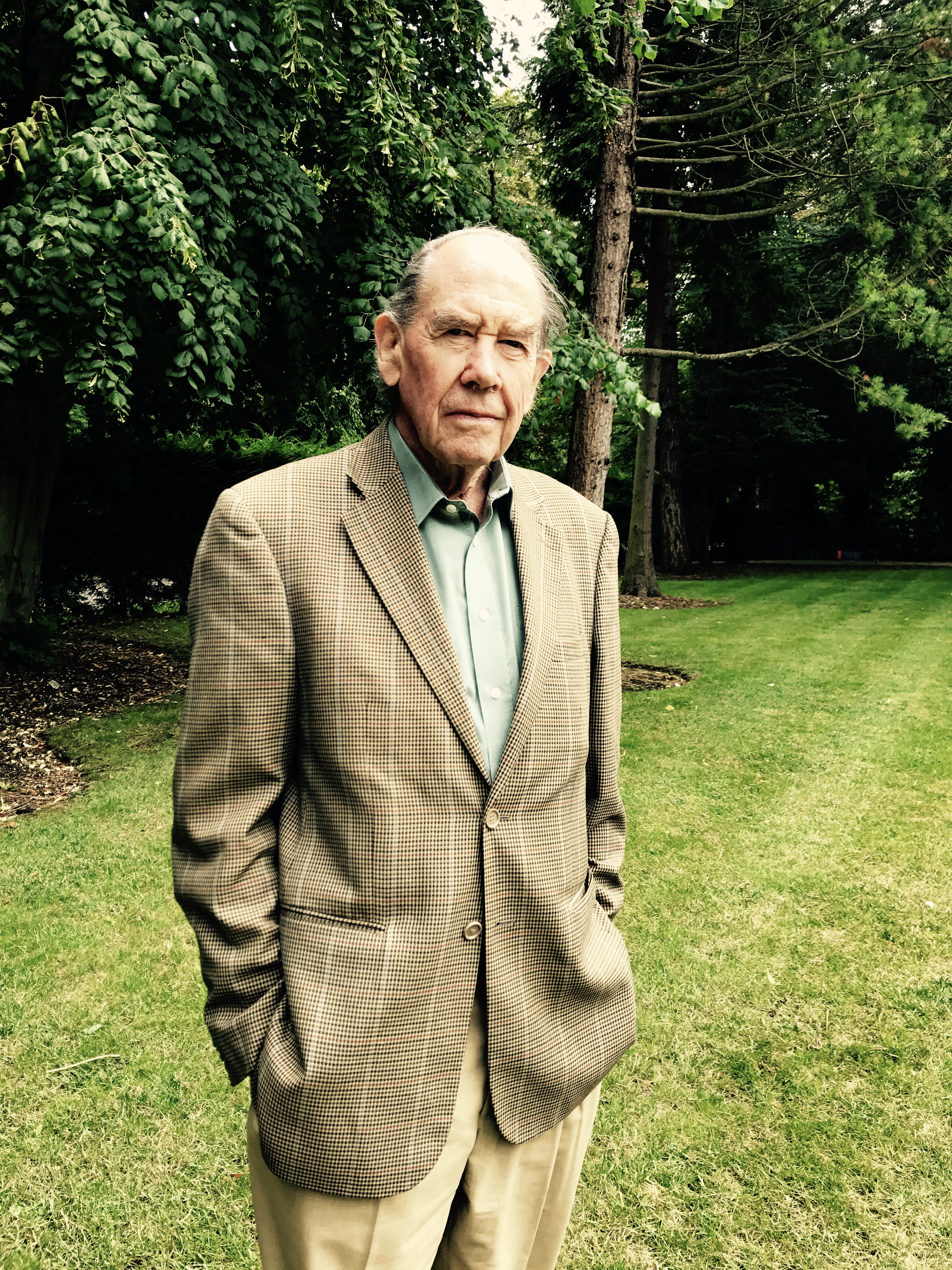
Sir Terence English, 2017

After retiring, English participated in trauma care training of doctors in Pakistan and Gaza, along with John Beavis; assisting with medical projects and treatment of Gaza's wounded; supporting the legalization of physician-assisted dying; as patron for Dignity in Dying; and 4x4 adventure driving across the world.

== Personal life and death ==
English married Ann Dicey in South Africa in 1963. They had four children and raised their family in Cambridge. They divorced in 2001 and she died in 2009. He married Judith Milne (now Judith English) in 2002. She became Principal of St Hilda's College, Oxford and they continued to live in Oxford.

English died after a stroke at his home in Iffley, Oxfordshire, on 23 November 2025, aged 93.

== Honours and awards ==
- 1951 – Transvaal Chamber of Mines Scholarship.
- 1979 – Travelling Scholarship, Society for Cardiothoracic Surgery in Great Britain and Ireland.
- 1980 – Man of the Year, The Royal Association for Disability and Rehabilitation.
- 1986 – Clement Price Thomas Award (RCS England), in recognition of outstanding contributions to surgery.
- 2009 – Lifetime Achievement Award (Society for Cardiothoracic Surgery in Great Britain and Ireland) for outstanding contributions to cardiothoracic surgery.
- 2014 – Lifetime Achievement Award from the International Society for Heart and Lung Transplantation in Recognition of Outstanding Achievements and Tireless Dedication in the Field of Heart and Lung Transplantation.
- 2014 – The Ray C Fish Award for Scientific Achievement in Cardiovascular Disease from the Texas Heart Institute.

In addition, English had ten Honorary Fellowships from Medical Colleges around the world and honorary doctorates from Sussex University, Hull University, Oxford Brookes University, University of Nantes, Mahidol University Thailand and University of Witwatersrand.

== Books and publications ==
- "Follow Your Star" From Mining to Heart Transplants – A Surgeon's Story (AuthorHouse 2011).
- Principles of Cardiac Diagnosis and Treatment – A Surgeon's Guide, edited by Donald Ross, Terence English and Roxane McKay Springer-Verlag (Second Edition, London, 1992).
- 23 chapters contributed to books.
- 118 peer reviewed articles.

Academic offices
Preceded by Sir Ian Todd	President of the Royal College of Surgeons of England; 1989–1992	Succeeded by Sir Norman Browse
