= Derrick Morris =

British heart transplant recipient (1930–2005)

- Morris in 1980
- Born: 24 March 1930
- Died: 30 July 2005 (aged 75)
- Occupation: Supervisor at Swansea Docks
- Known for: Longest surviving heart transplant recipient 2005 (25 years)

Derrick Morris (24 March 1930 – 30 July 2005) was, at the time of his death, Europe's longest-surviving heart transplant recipient, living 25 years after the transplant performed by Sir Magdi Yacoub in 1980. He died from an illness that was not heart or transplant related.

Morris had his first heart attack in 1975 and was told to expect to live only months. He became an active campaigner against heart disease, an advocate of organ donation as well as a symbol of the success of organ transplantation.

== Early life and illness ==
Derrick Morris was born on 24 March 1930. He was from Swansea in Wales, and was working as a supervisor at Swansea Docks when he suffered his first heart attack in 1975. He was given only a 15% chance of survival, and was told to "live six months at a time".

== Heart surgery ==
Morris was initially sceptical when a heart transplant was suggested but was persuaded by his doctor. He recalled, "we were told of the dangers. Because transplant work was in its infancy, the chances of survival were slim. But I decided for the family's sake to go ahead." His surgeon Magdi Yacoub later commented that Morris's transplant helped shape public opinion: "Most importantly, Derrick went on to show that transplantation was a good thing."

The operation took place on 23 February 1980 at Harefield Hospital and was Yacoub's third such procedure and one of 14 performed at Harefield that year, following an initial moratorium on heart transplant procedures and before the introduction of cyclosporin. The procedure had been discontinued in 1973 due to poor results. The donor was a 26-year-old woman who had been killed in a car crash. After the operation, Morris eventually returned to work at the docks. He was the eleventh person in the UK to receive a heart transplant. (Note: On 3 May 1968, the United Kingdom's medical history garnered its first heart transplant. It was carried out at the National Heart Hospital in Marylebone in London.)

It was argued that the cost of the operation was not money well spent because the National Health Service would have been better to spend it on preventing heart disease rather than doing transplants. Several people who had transplants at Harefield died while Morris was recovering.

Morris's fate became intertwined with the largely transformative transplant success of Yacoub.

== Later life ==
By the 20th anniversary of his operation, Morris already held the European survival record. The longest heart transplant survivor in Britain before Morris's surgery was Keith Castle, who had surgery performed by Sir Terence English in August 1979 at Papworth Hospital.

In conjunction with celebrating his two decades of postoperative life, Morris said his heart disease was serious and debilitating, noting: "Twenty years ago I was a complete invalid. I couldn't even walk. In February 1980 Yacoub gave me my new heart and since then I have come on in leaps and bounds." This enabled him to travel to a number of countries, including making five journeys to the United States, and see his grandchildren grow up. These were all experiences that would not have been possible without the transplant.

By 2000, Harefield ran the largest heart and lung transplant programme in the world. Yacoub and his team went on to perform more than 3,000 heart and heart–lung transplants.

Morris retired at the age of 65 and outlived his wife Beryl. When 25 years arrived, Morris expressed surprise: "It was an anniversary I thought I would never get to." In July 2005, Morris joined 1,000 other people who had survived heart and lung transplant operations at a celebration at Harefield Hospital to mark 25 years of transplant surgery. He was Harefield and Europe's longest surviving recipient. Just weeks before his death, he participated in a 4 kilometres (2.5 mi) stroll along Swansea Bay to raise funds for heart disease research.

== Death and legacy ==
Morris died from a flu-like illness on 30 July 2005 at the age of 75, six months after the 25th anniversary party. By then, he had three grandchildren.

His long lasting legacy was that: "Most importantly, Derrick went on to show that transplantation was a good thing", said Yacoub. Morris is said to have been instrumental in a sea change in public opinion about this type of surgery. Morris promoted campaigns to fight heart disease and was effectively both a benchmark and a "poster child" for signing up potential organ donors. His survival and his lifetime example was called a transplant medicine "inspiration" by Yacoub. His successful operation and prolonged survival had a profound effect on public opinion relative to heart transplants. (Note: "He provided inspiration and encouragement for the thousands of people who underwent the operation at a time when the life expectancy of transplant patients was counted in days rather than years.")

His longevity record was later surpassed by John McCafferty, who became Britain's longest surviving heart transplant recipient by 2013 at the age 73. (Note: In a procedure carried out by Yacoub and survived over 33 years, until 10 February 2016. McCafferty was recognised as the world's longest surviving heart transplant patient by Guinness World Records in 2013, surpassing the previous Guinness World Record of 30 years, 11 months and 10 days set by an American man who died in 2009. The previous record holder was Tony Huesman, who died 30 years, 11 months and 10 days after receiving a new heart.)
