= Margaret Billingham =

Kenyan-born American pathologist (1930-2009)

- Born: Margaret Evelyn Macpherson; September 20, 1930; Tanga, Tanzania
- Died: July 14, 2009 (aged 78); Grass Valley, California, U.S.
- Education: Royal Free Hospital
- Occupation: Pathologist
- Known for: 'Billingham's Criteria' in post heart transplant rejection
- Spouse: John Billingham (her death)
- Children: 2
- Scientific career
- Institutions: Stanford University

Margaret Evelyn Billingham (née Macpherson; September 20, 1930 - July 14, 2009) was a British-American pathologist at Stanford University Medical Center, who made significant achievements in the early recognition and grading of transplant rejection following cardiac transplantation, known as 'Billingham's Criteria'. She also described chronic rejection and techniques in heart endomyocardial biopsy.

Born in Tanzania, and educated at the Loreto School in Kenya, she subsequently qualified from the Royal Free Hospital in London, Billingham found herself developing rejection pathology and eventually becoming director of cardiac pathology at Stanford University Medical Center. She settled in the United States with her husband, who was also a doctor, and their two children, and died there in 2009.

== Early life ==
Billingham's father was posted as a British diplomat, to Tanzania. She was then born in 1930 in Tanga, Tanzania, and then educated at Loreto School in Kenya. She had a sister, Shirley Anne. Moving to England, she gained admission to the Royal Free Hospital in London to study medicine, subsequently graduating in 1954.

== Family ==
She met her future husband John Billingham while they were both doing their junior house posts. They married in 1956, while they were both employed at Hampstead General Hospital. In 1963, they then emigrated to Houston, Texas, with their two sons, Robert and Graham. Two years later, in 1965, they moved to San Francisco Bay. Her husband became chief of the life sciences division at Ames Research Center.

== Medical career ==
In 1966, Billingham started a 2-year postdoctoral researcher at Stanford. Originally in cardiopulmonary medicine, she then switched to pathology in 1968. By 1988, Billingham was professor in pathology at Stanford.

She worked closely with Philip Caves at Norman Shumway's cardiac transplantation unit, where they developed the technique for assessing and monitoring acute organ rejection following heart transplant surgery. Serial biopsies, taken from transplanted hearts within the recipients, were taken using a newly developed bioptome, percutaneous transvenous endomyocardial biopsy. The histological samples were examined in the pathology laboratories for early signs of rejection, allowing early treatment interventions. The timing of her work coincided with the excitement in early heart transplant surgery, with Norman Shumway performing the first heart transplant in the United States in 1968. She was at Stanford at a time when Stanford was leading cardiac transplantation research on an international platform and when places like Stanford had relatively few leading female scientists.

The grading system was soon adopted as the standard method for examining rejection and other cardiac diseases. Her work led her to be known as 'founder of cardiac transplantation pathology'. In addition, she also worked on research into the toxicity of the Adriamycin, a chemotherapy drug.

In 1972, she became diplomat for the American Board of Pathology. She also became a fellow of the Royal College of Pathologists, American College of Cardiology and the American College of Pathology. In 1990, she became the first female president of the International Society for Heart and Lung Transplantation (ISHLT).

Billingham authored more than 500 papers, abstracts and chapters.

== Later life and legacy ==
In 1994, three years after being appointed director of women in medicine and medical sciences at Stanford's school of medicine, she retired. Together with her husband, they moved to Penn Valley in Northern California. Spending time with her family, discovering California and enjoying fishing and gardening, were to become her pastimes until her death at Sierra Nevada Memorial Hospital, Grass Valley, California, from kidney cancer in 2009.

Billingham not only devised the scoring system for acute heart transplant rejection based on endomyocardial biopsy samples at Stanford, but worked on getting it accepted internationally. This "Billingham criteria" became widely used.

== Tributes ==
Described by colleagues as "generous", "kind", "gracious" and "reflective", she was also known to advocate fellow female physicians.

"Her contributions were the key to advancing the care and survival of heart transplant patients" – Robert Robbins, director of cardiovascular institute.

Billingham received numerous International honours and awards. In 1986, she received the medal for histopathology of heart transplantation, from the University of Padua, and the city of Paris gold medal for contributions to heart transplantation.

The U.S. and Canadian Academy of Pathology bestowed her the Distinguished Pathologist of the Year Award for 2001. She was frequently invited to speak at many National Institutes of Health symposiums and also been advisor to them.

Following her death, the ISHLT awarded her their lifetime achievement award.

== Selected publications ==
- Caves, Philip K.; Stinson, Edward B.; Billingham, Margaret; Shumway, Norman E. (1973). "Percutaneous Transvenous Endomyocardial Biopsy in Human Heart Recipients". The Annals of Thoracic Surgery. 16 (4). Elsevier BV: 325–336. doi:10.1016/s0003-4975(10)65002-3. ISSN 0003-4975. PMID 4583546..
- Billingham, M. E. (April 1980). "Pathology-epitomes of progress: endomyocardial biopsy". The Western Journal of Medicine. 132 (4): 340–341. ISSN 0093-0415. PMC 1272071. PMID 18748589.
