= Jane Somerville =

British physician

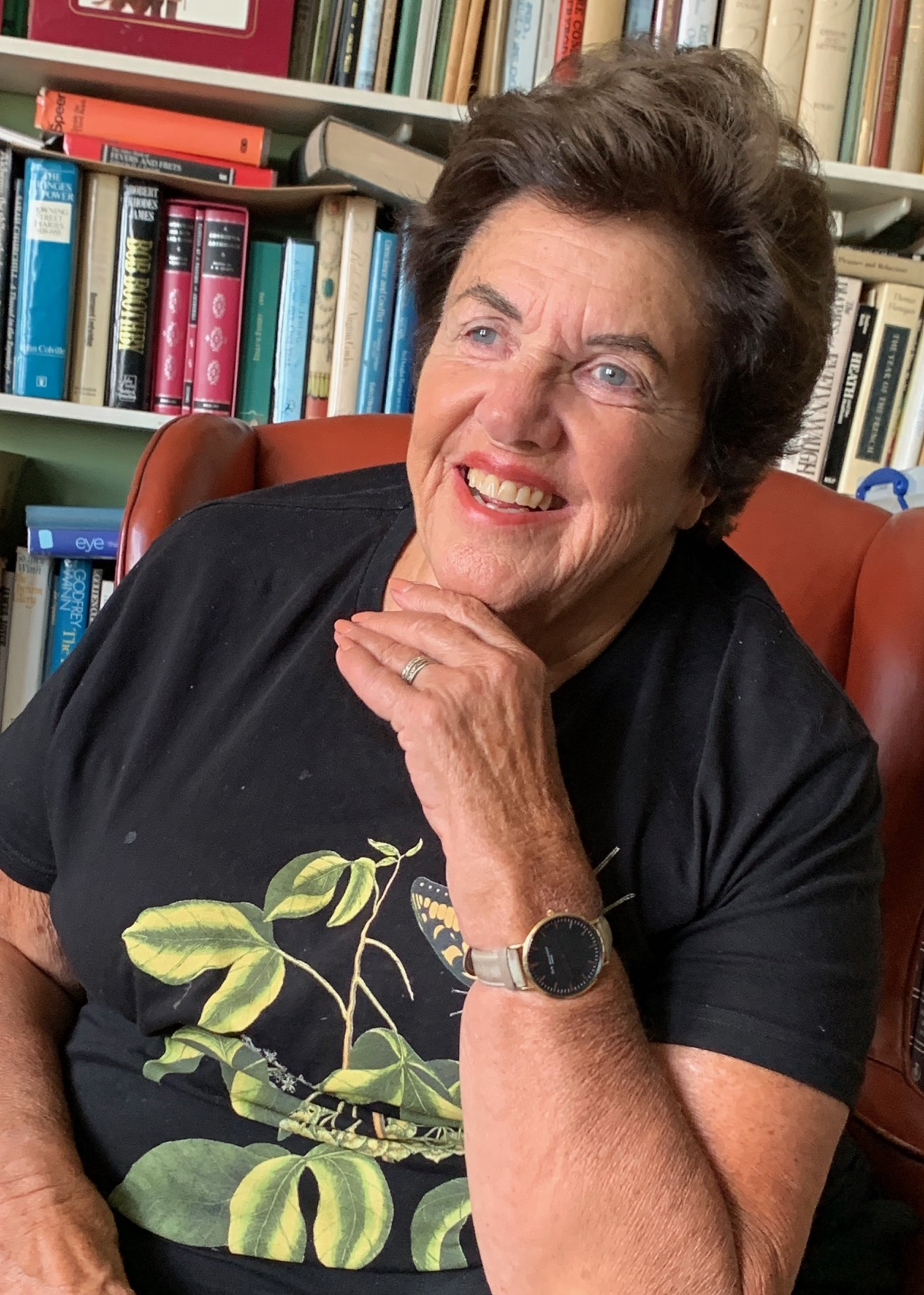
- Jane Somerville in her personal library (2019)
- Born: Jane Platnauer; 24 January 1933 (age 93)
- Education: Queen's College, London; Guy's Hospital Medical School
- Known for: Physician to Britain's first heart transplantation (1968); Founding concept of GUCH; Idea of the first World Congress of Paediatric Cardiology; Founding the charity "The Somerville Foundation"
- Medical career
- Profession: Physician
- Field: Cardiology
- Institutions: National Heart Hospital; Hospital for Sick Children in Great Ormond Street; Brompton Hospital; Imperial College
- Sub-specialties: Congenital heart defects
- Awards: Gold Medal of the European Society of Cardiology; Distinguished Service Award of the American College of Cardiology

Jane Somerville (née Platnauer; 24 January 1933) is a British emeritus professor of cardiology at Imperial College, London, who is best known for defining the concept and subspecialty of grown ups with congenital heart disease (GUCH) and being chosen as the physician involved with Britain's first heart transplantation by Donald Ross in 1968.

Somerville was educated first at a boys preparatory school in North Wales, then Queen's College, London, and later at Guy's Hospital Medical School. Initially drawn to surgery, she chose to pursue a career in cardiology at the National Heart Hospital, Hospital for Sick Children in Great Ormond Street and later at the Brompton Hospital.

Her work led to the opening of the world's first dedicated ward for children and adolescents with congenital heart disease, the first World Congress of Paediatric Cardiology in London, and a GUCH charity which was later renamed "The Somerville Foundation" in her honour. The medical professionals who she trained and who have come to celebrate and follow her are known as "Unicorns".

== Early life and education ==
Jane Somerville was born in Edwardes Square, Kensington, London, on 24 January 1933 to Joseph Bertram Platnauer, who was a theatre critic for the Tatler magazine and Pearl Ashton who worked on Vogue. Her early childhood was spent under the guidance of a strict Irish governess at the family residence in Park Square which later became the site for The Prince's Trust.

During the Second World War and The Blitz, when children were ordered out of London, Somerville was sent to a boys preparatory school in the Welsh village of Portmeirion. She remained there for three years, being only one of six girls among 70 boys.

Following studies in the sciences at Queen's College school, Harley Street, London, Somerville gained admission into the male dominated Guy's Hospital Medical School, where women medical students had been present for only the previous two years and the class was more than 90% men. During her student years, she was influenced by a visit to the school by Alfred Blalock of Johns Hopkins Hospital, whose achievements in treating tetralogy of Fallot with the Blalock Taussig shunt, transformed the lives of children. The once fatal heart disease could now be corrected and turn a blue baby to pink in minutes.

== Early medical career ==
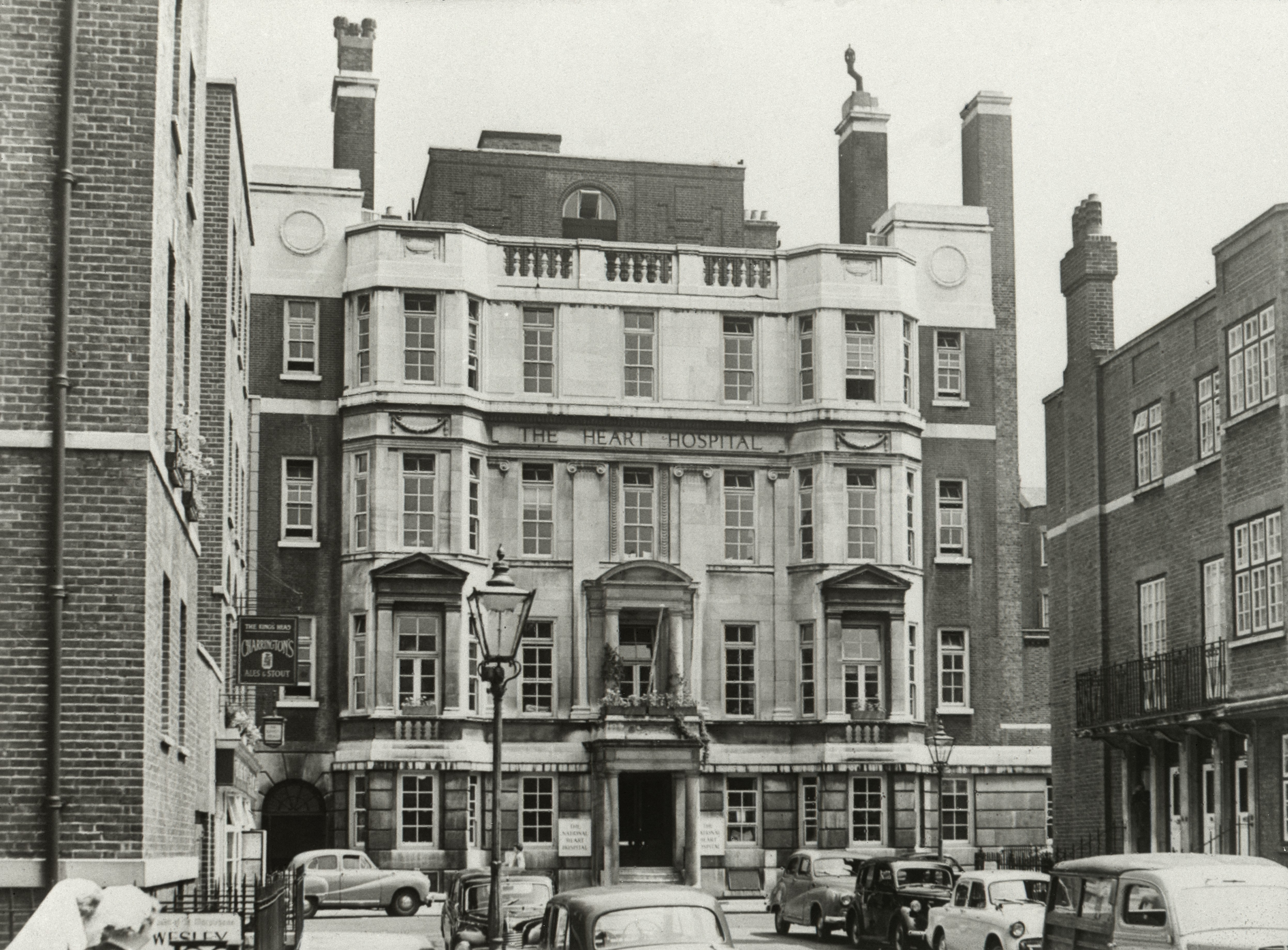
National Heart Hospital, Westmoreland Street

Somerville initially aimed for a career in heart surgery and worked for heart surgery pioneer Sir Russell Brock. She recognised her own lack of dexterity and later recounted "but I was no good because my hands were not connected to my head" and changed course to become a cardiologist. She became the first female medical registrar at Guy's Hospital.

In 1958, she became a registrar at the National Heart Hospital, on Westmoreland Street, where cardiologist Paul Wood took her on to his team. Here, her interest in congenital heart disease led her to take on simultaneous work at the Hospital for Sick Children in Great Ormond Street, London, and she learnt about diseases in babies and surgery with Richard Bonham Carter and David Waterston.

In 1967, during a time of significant innovations in heart surgery, Somerville was appointed as a consultant at the National Heart Hospital. She recognised the unmet need of the increasing number of adolescents and adults who were now surviving the heart conditions they were born with, thus founding the concept of GUCH. This new group of survivors had new medical problems and some soon required repeat operations, challenging the cardiologists of the time.

Somerville also worked alongside cardio-thoracic surgeon Donald Ross, who chose her to be the cardiologist for the first heart transplantation in the UK in 1968. They co-authored a number of innovative articles, including in 1966, the first report of the use of a homograft aortic valve to repair pulmonary atresia.

== Later medical career ==
=== Paul Wood ward ===
In 1975, Somerville, "always feisty and prepared for battle", succeeded in raising enough funds to open the world's first hospital ward solely for the use of children and adolescents with congenital heart disease. It was named the Paul Wood Ward. The atmosphere differed from a purely children's ward. While it did have a children's play area, guided by a play leader, it also had a kitchen for adolescents and families. Family members could interact with each other, have a coffee and make a snack. This was appreciated by older adolescents, who in turn supported younger ones.

=== World Congress ===
In 1980, she held the first World Congress of Paediatric Cardiology in London, a concept she envisaged. In 1988, she enlisted the help of American heart surgeon John W. Kirklin during the first Paediatric Cardiac Surgical Congress in Bergamo, resulting in a collaboration between heart physicians and heart surgeons.

Somerville's pioneering GUCH care and teaching led her to be followed by "Unicorns", her ex-trainees who gather at the World Congress of Paediatric Cardiology every year to celebrate her life and work. In explaining the "Unicorns", Somerville answered;

I try to teach my fellows that they have to have imagination. You have to be able to diagnose a disease that you have never seen, or perhaps even read about, and you have to combine your memory with it. That's why my trainees are called unicorns, because I used to tell them that there's this imaginary animal that nobody had ever seen but if you saw one in the ward, you’d recognize it. Without the ability to imagine, I’m not sure you would quite know what was going on.

=== Brompton Hospital ===
The Brompton Hospital incorporated the National Heart Hospital in 1989, however the adolescent ward was not included in the transition. Somerville thereafter worked on re-establishing one, which was later renamed the Jane Somerville GUCH Unit in 1996.

In 1995, the British Cardiac Society held the first Paul Wood lecture, which Somerville gave. The title of her speech was "The Master's Legacy".

In 1998, Somerville was appointed emeritus professor of cardiology, Imperial College. She retired a year later.

=== GUCH Patients Association ===
In the early 1990s, she founded the European Society of Cardiology Working Group on GUCH and became its chairperson in 1995. The GUCH patients were presenting with numerous problems outside their medical need that she founded and became president of the GUCH patient association in 1994, launched from the now Royal Brompton Hospital. GUCH patients could now talk to each other, seek help for all the social problems and meet to find they were not alone. The organisation was supported by the British Heart Foundation and its name was subsequently changed to the Somerville Foundation in her honour.

== Awards and honours ==
Somerville is the recipient of the Gold Medal of the European Society of Cardiology, the Guys treasurers gold medal in clinical surgery and the Distinguished Service Award of the American College of Cardiology.

In 2012, Somerville was named as one of five legends in cardiology at the American College of Cardiology Scientific Sessions. A "self-proclaimed trouble maker", she shared the event at Chicago with Eugene Braunwald, Valentín Fuster, Antonio Colombo and Magdi Yacoub, when she spoke about her 50 years with heart surgeons.

She is the second woman, after Helen Taussig, to enter the Paediatric Cardiology Hall of Fame.

On 13 December 2024, Somerville was awarded a Midalja għall-Qadi tar-Repubblika (Medal for Service to the Republic) by Maltese President Myriam Spiteri Debono in Malta's Republic Day honors.

== Personal life ==
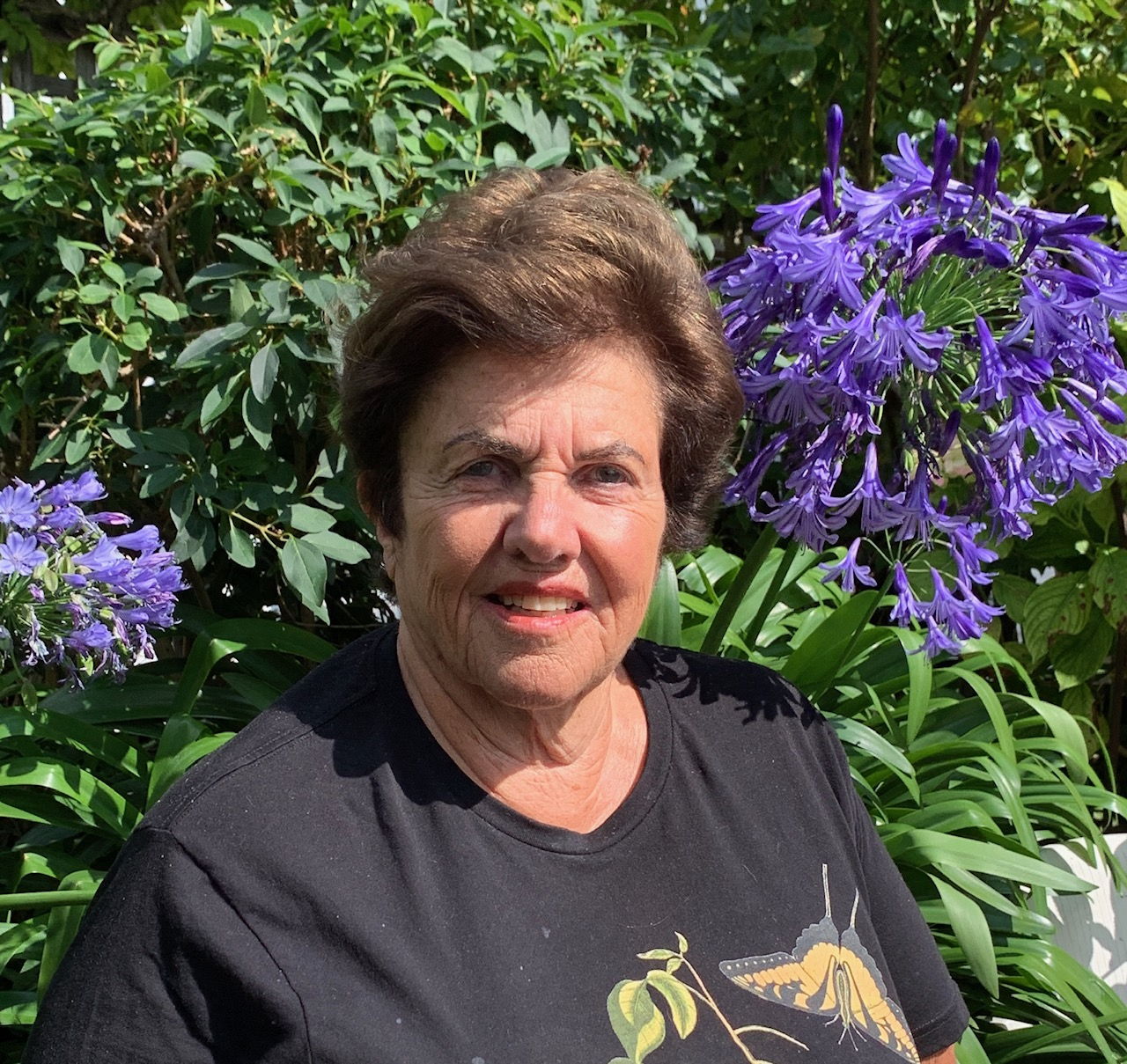
Jane Somerville, roof garden (2019)

In 1957, Platnauer married Walter Somerville, who she met in the late 1940s, when she was age 16 and he was staying next door. The couple had four children; one daughter and three sons . Walter died in 2005.

Her hobbies include collecting antiques, roof gardening and opera.

== Retirement ==
Following retirement, Somerville continued to travel the world and teach. The GUCH clinic at the Mater Dei Hospital in Malta is based on her model.

In 2013 Somerville was a guest on the BBC's Desert Island Discs with Kirsty Young.

== Selected publications ==
- Somerville, J (1965). "Ostium Primum Defect: Factors Causing Deterioration in the Natural History". Br Heart J. 27 (3): 413–9. doi:10.1136/hrt.27.3.413. PMC 503324. PMID 14284359.
- Ross, D (1966). "Correction of Pulmonary Atresia with a Homograft Aortic Valve". The Lancet. 288 (7479): 1446–1447. doi:10.1016/S0140-6736(66)90600-3. PMID 4163445.
- Ross, D; Somerville, J (1970). "Surgical correction of Ebstein's anomaly". Lancet. 2 (7667): 280–4. doi:10.1016/s0140-6736(70)91329-2. PMID 4194361.
- Somerville, J (1970). "Management of pulmonary atresia". Br Heart J. 32 (5): 641–51. doi:10.1136/hrt.32.5.641. PMC 487386. PMID 5470046.
- Somerville, J (1979). "Congenital heart disease--changes in form and function". Br Heart J. 41 (1): 1–22. doi:10.1136/hrt.41.1.1. PMC 482007. PMID 154911.
- Somerville, J (1998). "Paul Wood Lecture. The master's legacy: the first Paul Wood Lecture". Heart. 80 (6): 612–8, discussion 618-9. doi:10.1136/hrt.80.6.612. PMC 1728862. PMID 10065034.
- Report of the British Cardiac Society Working Party (2002). "Grown-up congenital heart (GUCH) disease: current needs and provision of service for adolescents and adults with congenital heart disease in the UK". Heart. 88 Suppl 1 (Suppl 1): i1-14. doi:10.1136/heart.88.suppl_1.i1. PMC 1876264. PMID 12181200.
- Somerville, Jane (2012). "The World Congress of Paediatric Cardiology and Cardiac Surgery: a short factual history by Jane Somerville". Cardiology in the Young. 22 (6): 633–638. doi:10.1017/S1047951112002119. PMID 23331581. S2CID 9625469.
