= Ositadimma =

ositadimma
- Gender: Male
- Language(s): Igbo

Origin
- Word/name: Nigeria
- Meaning: May all be well from now

Ositadimma means may all be well from now in the Igbo language. It is a male given name and surname. Notable people include:

- Ositadimma "Osi" Umenyiora, footballer
- Fabian Anene Ositadimma Udekwu, Medical doctor
- Osita Nebo
