= Philip Caves =

Irish cardiothoracic surgeon

Philip Kennedy Caves M.R.C.S F.R.C.S. (Eng) MB BCh BAO DObst RCOG
- Born: 1940; Belfast, Northern Ireland, United Kingdom
- Died: 23 July 1978 (aged 37 or 38)
- Education: Royal Belfast Academical Institution; Queen's University Belfast
- Occupation: Cardiothoracic surgeon
- Notable work: Endomyocardial biopsy in early detection of heart transplant rejection
- Spouse: Margaret Caves
- Children: 3
- Awards: British American Research Fellowship, 1971; European travelling scholarship of the British Heart Foundation, 1974; Ballahouston and Lister Travelling scholarship, Glasgow University, 1978

Philip Kennedy Caves (23 July 1940 – 1978) was a Northern Irish cardiothoracic surgeon. In 1972, while at Stanford University, he pioneered the use of the bioptome and transvenous endomyocardial biopsy in the early diagnosis of heart transplant rejection. It was considered the most significant advance in antirejection therapy of the time. Awarded the British American Research Fellowship in 1971, Caves worked with pioneering cardiothoracic surgeon Norman Shumway at Stanford and became staff surgeon leading the transplant programme by 1973. A year later he went to Edinburgh as a senior lecturer in cardiac surgery, where he became particularly interested in pediatric cardiac surgery.

By 1975, Caves had become a professor in the University of Glasgow honorary consultant surgeon and chair of cardiac surgery in Glasgow and with 'inexhaustible dynamism' involved in the organisation of cardiac surgery. His sudden death at the age of 38 years whilst playing squash was said to have shocked many of his colleagues. The International Society of Heart and Lung Transplantation (ISHLT) bestows one of its highest awards in his name.

== Early education ==
Caves was born in Belfast, Northern Ireland in 1940. He attended the Royal Belfast Academical Institution and then studied medicine at Queen's University Belfast, from which he graduated with a MB BCh in 1964.

== Surgical career ==
Caves achieved the DObst RCOG in 1966 and the FRCS for Edinburgh in 1968. That year, he began his early surgical training with the cardiovascular and thoracic unit at Royal Victoria Hospital, Belfast, continuing at the Brompton Hospital, London in 1970 after taking the English FRCS in 1969. In 1971, the British and American Heart Associations awarded him and funded a research fellowship at Stanford University. After receiving the research fellowship to Stanford, Caves worked in the dog laboratory with Margaret Billingham, who was the histopathologist at Stanford. Here, he perfected the technique of percutaneous transvenous endomyocardial biopsy using the flexible Stanford-Caves Schulz bioptome which transformed the management of heart transplant patients and helped in a significant improvement in the results of heart transplantation. Werner Schulz was an instrument maker and key to the modification of the bioptome. Until that time the only way of trying to detect early rejection was by the daily monitoring of summated EKG voltages which tended to decline as rejection developed but at a relatively late stage.

However, by being able to examine small biopsies taken from the interventricular septum of the heart it was possible to detect early histological changes of rejection and increase immunosuppressive treatment earlier and more effectively. Likewise, repeat biopsy after some days could define whether the rejection was resolving and reduce therapy sooner. The device, a modification of one produced by Konno in Japan, was inserted through the right internal jugular vein and guided into the right ventricle of the transplanted heart. A biopsy was then taken. This technique of allowing early detection of acute organ rejection and confirming absence of rejection eventually resulted in the establishment of a heart rejection grading system. Cyclosporin was given if the biopsy result indicated early rejection. By the 1980s this was considered the best method of detection. During his second year, Stanford's leading cardiothoracic surgeon, Norman Shumway had become impressed with what Caves had achieved and he promoted Caves to Chief Resident in 1972 and to Staff Surgeon in charge of the Transplant programme in 1973.

Caves travelled to Edinburgh in 1974 to become senior lecturer in the Department of Clinical Surgery, where he was active in new techniques in coronary artery surgery in newborns and infants. He held the first chair of cardiac surgery at the University of Glasgow in 1975, and contributed to the development of the adult and paediatric cardiac surgical service for the west of Scotland. A close friend who visited Caves in Stanford and later pioneered the cardiac transplant programme in Cambridge, Sir Terence English, described Caves in an interview as giving priority to the development of the paediatric and adult cardiac services and having "great enthusiasm for the future of heart transplantation".

Caves was a left-handed surgeon who worked with specially designed left-handed instruments. Shumway made sure that Caves took his left-handed tools with him on return to Scotland. His influence on attitudes at Glasgow's Children's Hospital in the 1970s has been described as "whirlwind" as he operated on newborns who were previously considered not fit for surgery. According to his cousin, at one stage, Caves was performing up to one hundred operations a month. Among colleagues, Caves is thought to have been the most likely surgeon to have started the UK's first heart transplant program had he lived. He was influential in the careers of future pioneering surgeons including John Wallwork, who joined Papworth Hospital's Heart transplant programme in 1981 and was experienced in the use of cyclosporin after heart transplant whilst a chief resident at Stanford, under Shumway. His lecturing skills were highly regarded and sought after.

== Death and legacy ==
Dr. Caves died unexpectedly in Scotland from a heart attack on 23 July 1978, while playing a game of squash in Helensburgh. Since 1983, the International Society for Heart and Lung Transplant has awarded its highest award to a surgical trainee. $1,000 is awarded at the Caves Award session during the annual general meeting to the surgical trainee who gives the best oral presentation. Eligibility criteria include students / Residents / Fellows / Scientists in training who are first authors and presenters, must be current members of the Society and not having previously won the award.

It was recorded at the 50th anniversary of the annals of thoracic surgery in 2015, that Caves' approach to early organ rejection "remains the gold standard for today".

== Awards ==
- 1971 – British American Research Fellowship
- 1974 – The British Heart Foundation's European Travelling Fellowship
- 1978 – The Ballahouston and Lister Travelling Fellowship from the University of Glasgow

== Family ==
Caves and his wife, Margaret, had three children: a daughter and two sons. Caves was a religious man who was an active practising Christian, supporting his church.

== Selected publications ==
- "Percutaneous Transvenous Endomyocardial Biopsy in Human Heart Recipients". The Annals of Thoracic Medicine, Vol. 16, Issue 4 (October 1973), pp. 325–336, doi:10.1016/S0003-4975(10)65002-3. Co-authored with Edward B. Stinson, Margaret Billingham and Norman E. Shumway.
