= Rosemary Radley-Smith =

British paediatric cardiologist (1939–2020)

- Born: 26 February 1939; London, England
- Died: 1 August 2020 (aged 81)
- Education: Cheltenham Ladies' College; Royal Free Hospital Medical School
- Occupation: Paediatric cardiologist
- Known for: Pride of Britain Award

Rosemary Claire Radley-Smith (married name Hopewell; 26 February 1939 – 1 August 2020) was a British paediatric cardiologist who worked at Harefield Hospital, west London for many years and founded several charities. In 2001, she received the Pride of Britain Award.

== Biography ==
She was born in 1939 in London to Eric and Eileen Radley-Smith. Her father, a doctor, and her mother, a nurse, both trained at the King’s College Hospital where Rosemary was born, the oldest child of the family. She was raised in Surrey and Sussex and studied at the Cheltenham Ladies' College, and then began courses in medicine at the Royal Free Hospital Medical School, London and graduated in 1963. She undertook junior doctor training at the Royal Free, the Brompton and the Westminster Children’s Hospitals and then moved to Melbourne, Australia in 1966 for additional training. While there, she actively worked with the Royal Flying Doctor service on weekends.

=== Cardiologist ===
Radley-Smith was named the first Consultant Paediatric Cardiologist at Harefield Hospital, Middlesex in July 1971. In a "partnership recognised around the world", she began working with Sir Magdi Yacoub to create an innovative and successful centre that would include all aspects of congenital cardiology.

Over the next three decades, they succeeded in this task and established the Paediatric Surgical Unit (PSU), as one of the leading centres in the world, renowned for many pioneering procedures, such the 1976 two-stage arterial switch operation and in May 1982 the one-stage neonatal arterial switch. Valve preserving operations in children and adults, and use of antibiotic preserved aortic homografts for valve replacement, and as part of complex congenital heart repairs, was another area of ground breaking surgery. Harefield PSU was the first unit in the UK to initiate a heart and heart-lung transplant programme in 1984 – achieving a successful cardiosurgical collaboration. From that time until the unit’s move to the Royal Brompton and GOSH (transplants) in 2001 on the retirement of Professor Sir Magdi Yacoub, 193 heart and 96 heart-lung transplants were carried out in children (the youngest seven days old), including the pioneering heterotopic and domino operations. Such innovative work attracted patients and clinicians from all over the world.

For over the next 15 years, she led the service on her own.

=== Chain of Hope ===
Radley-Smith was a founder trustee and later a director of the charity Chain of Hope in the United Kingdom.

She was dedicated to helping to promote systems and infrastructure for treating children with congenital heart disease in developing countries. She co-led numerous medico-surgical missions to countries such as Egypt, Mozambique, Kenya and Jamaica to evaluate and treat patients and develop their services. For this work Rosemary was awarded the Pride of Britain award in 2001.

=== Personal life ===
Radley-Smith was passionate about Britain's wildflowers and could identify many of them. "One popular presentation she gave was titled 'How to kill your partner with plants from your garden'".

She died peacefully on 1 August 2020 at the age of 81.

== Honors ==
Radley-Smith became a Fellow of the Royal Australasian College of Physicians (FRACP) in 1975, a Fellow of the Royal College of Physicians (FRCP) in 1980, a Fellow of the American College of Cardiology (FACC) in 1983 and a Fellow of the Royal College of Paediatrics and Child Health (FRCPCH) in 1997.

== Selected works ==
Radley-Smith was both a lecturer and researcher, and she authored more than 100 published papers.

- Yacoub, M., Radley-Smith, R., & Maclaurin, R. (1977). Two-stage operation for anatomical correction of transposition of the great arteries with intact interventricular septum. The Lancet, 309(8025), 1275-1278.
- Yacoub, M. H., Gehle, P., Chandrasekaran, V., Birks, E.J., Child, A., & Radley-Smith, R. (1998). Late results of a valve-preserving operation in patients with aneurysms of the ascending aorta and root. The Journal of thoracic and cardiovascular surgery, 115(5), 1080-1090.
- Wray, J., Long, T., Radley-Smith, R., & Yacoub, M. (2001). Returning to school after heart or heart-lung transplantation: how well do children adjust?. Transplantation, 72(1), 100-106.
- Smith, R. R., Wray, J., Khaghani, A., & Yacoub, M. (2005). Ten year survival after paediatric heart transplantation: a single centre experience. European journal of cardio-thoracic surgery, 27(5), 790-794.
- Wray, J., & Radley-Smith, R. (2006). Longitudinal assessment of psychological functioning in children after heart or heart-lung transplantation. The Journal of heart and lung transplantation, 25(3), 345-352.
- Wray, J., Waters, S., Radley‐Smith, R., & Sensky, T. (2006). Adherence in adolescents and young adults following heart or heart‐lung transplantation. Pediatric transplantation, 10(6), 694-700.
