= Royal Brompton Hospital =

- Guy's and St Thomas' NHS Foundation Trust
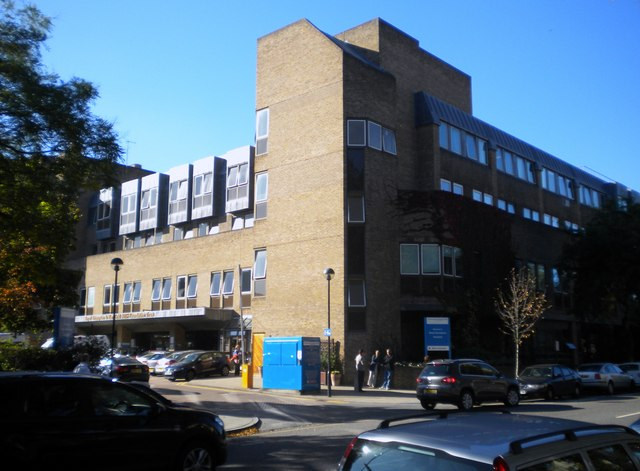

- Shown in Kensington and Chelsea

Geography
- Location: Sydney Street, Chelsea, London, England
- Coordinates: 51.4894°N 0.1707°W

Organisation
- Care system: National Health Service
- Type: Specialist
- Affiliated university: Imperial College London

Services
- Emergency department: No
- Beds: c.350
- Speciality: Heart and lung hospital

History
- Founded: 1847; 179 years ago

Links
- Website: www.rbht.nhs.uk

Royal Brompton Hospital is the largest specialist heart and lung medical centre in the United Kingdom. It is managed by Guy's and St Thomas' NHS Foundation Trust.

== History ==
=== Consumption in the 19th century ===
In the 19th century, consumption was a common word for tuberculosis. At the time, consumptive patients were turned away from other hospitals as there was no known cure. Hospitals that dealt with such diseases later came to be known as sanatoria. It was estimated in 1844 that of the 60,000 deaths each year in England and Wales caused by diseases, some 36,000 were caused by consumption.

=== The beginning ===
Consumption Hospital Act 1849
- Act of Parliament
- Parliament of the United Kingdom
- Long title: An Act to incorporate the Governors of the Hospital for Consumption and Diseases of the Chest, and to authorize the Establishment of a Chapel in connexion with the said Hospital, and to enable the said Governors the better to carry on their charitable Designs.
- Citation: 12 & 13 Vict. c. lxxx

Dates
- Royal assent: 1 August 1849

Text of statute as originally enacted

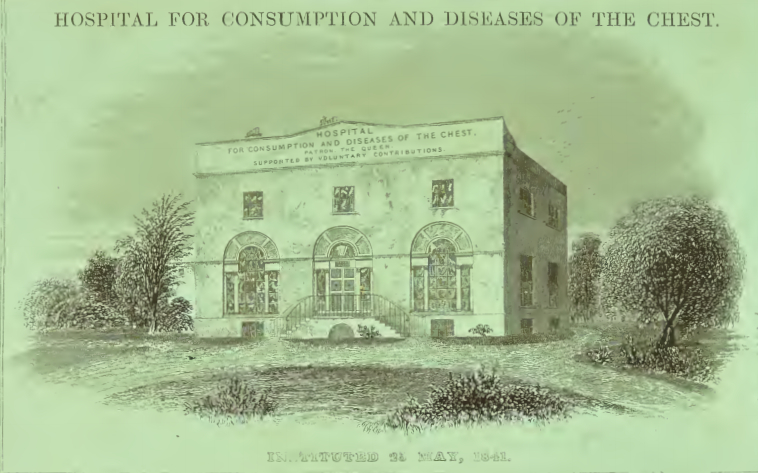
Hospital for Consumption and Diseases of the Chest, Manor House, Chelsea, 1841

The hospital was founded during the 1840s by a group led by Philip Rose, the first public meeting to promote the proposal for the hospital having been convened on 8 March 1841. It was to be known as the Hospital for Consumption and Diseases of the Chest. It amalgamated on 25 May 1841 with the West London Dispensary for Diseases of the Chest, which was based at 83 Wells Street, near Oxford Street. On 28 March 1842, an out-patients branch of the hospital was opened at 20 Great Marlborough Street. Later that year they acquired a lease on their first building for in-patients at the Manor House, Smith Street, Chelsea, which held space for 20 beds and the first in-patients were admitted on 13 September 1842. Admittance was to be by the then customary method of recommendation by the governors and subscribers. The governors were incorporated by the Consumption Hospital Act 1849 (12 & 13 Vict. c. lxxx).

=== Funding ===
In common with other hospitals at the time, the hospital was to be financed entirely from charitable donations, legacies and fund raising. Rose travelled the country to explain the aims of the hospital, setting up 14 provincial associations, 157 churches promised to preach special sermons as a means of fund raising. The famous singer Jenny Lind also gave concerts, including one at Her Majesty's Theatre in July 1848, which raised £1,606. Besides Philip Rose, the early supporters included Queen Victoria, who became a patron, with an annual subscription of £10.

=== The move to Brompton ===
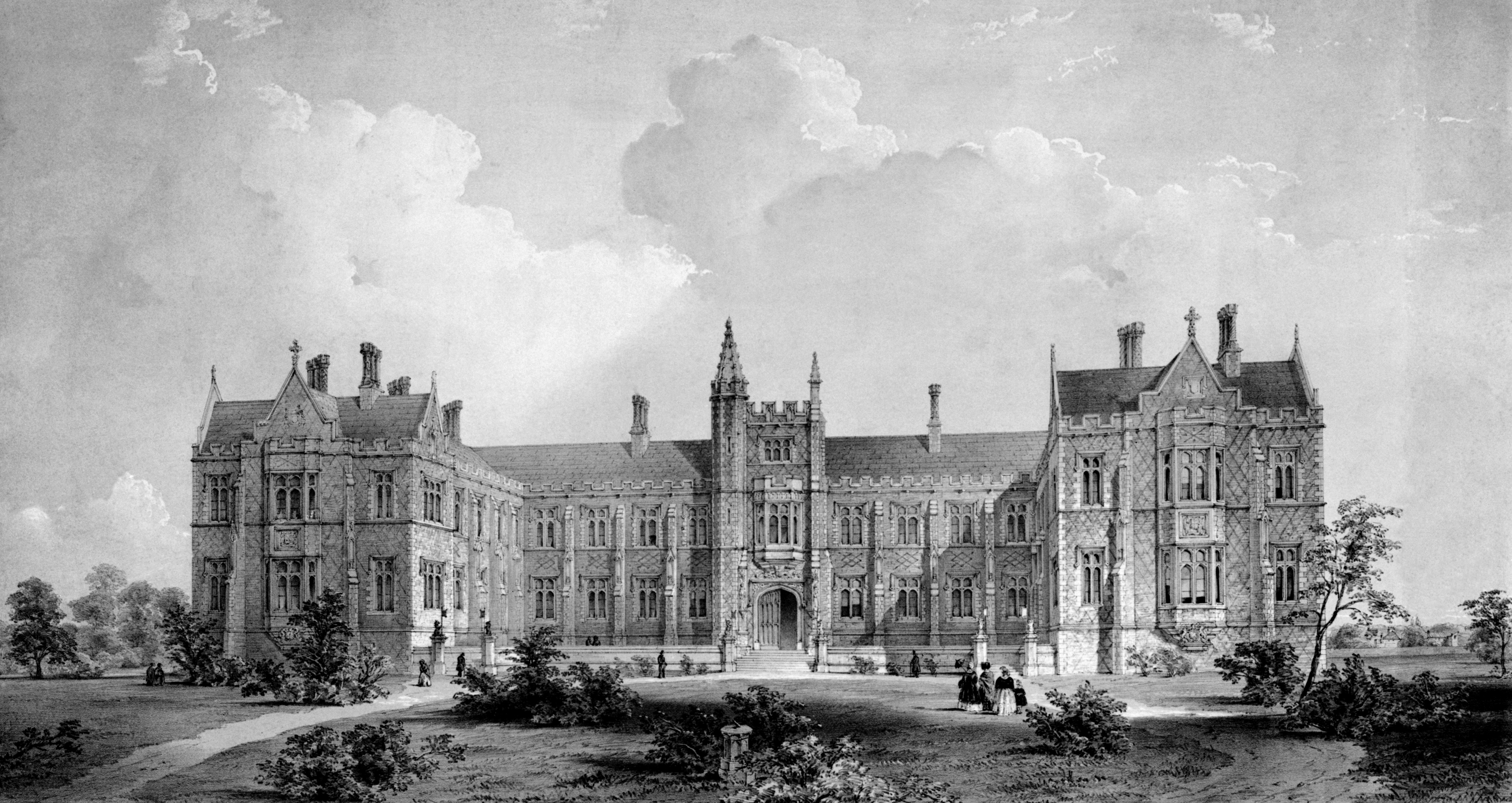
A view of the hospital shortly after it opened in 1846

The area known as Brompton was no more than a village surrounded by market gardens, but quickly developed in the 1840s. The hospital acquired a market garden site there from a charity to erect a new hospital, with the architect being Frederick John Francis. The stone laying for the west wing was on 11 June 1844 by Prince Albert, the Prince Consort. One of the features of the building was the inclusion of ventilation by forced warm air in an attempt to create a temperature more commonly found in more southern latitudes. The total cost for the west wing and part of the centre was £11,762. The first admission of patients was in 1846, whilst the east wing was completed in 1852.

The medical committee of the hospital commissioned a small sanatorium in Bournemouth which was designed by E. B. Lamb and opened as the Royal National Sanatorium for Diseases of the Chest in 1855.

The hospital acquired houses on the south side of the Brompton Road in 1868 with a plan to connect to the main building with a tunnel, which was completed in 1872. The hospital continued to purchase houses on the south side and eventually developed the site to become the south block of the Brompton, which was formally opened by the President of the corporation, The Earl of Derby on 13 June 1882. Without the bequest of Miss Cordelia Angelica Read of some £100,000, the hospital may never have been built. The building was in an "E" shape and constructed of red brick and Ancaster stone. The basement contained a compressed air room and Victorian Turkish baths. There were also facilities for a large outpatients department, rooms for resident staff and a lecture room and ten wards holding from 1 to 8 beds. The total cost was said to be £65,976.

=== Frimley Sanitorium ===
On 13 September 1900, the Royal Brompton Hospital acquired 20 acres (8.1 ha) of planted forestry at Chobham Ridge (which is 400 feet (120 m) above sea level), 2 miles (3.2 km) from Frimley Railway Station for £3,900. The hospital was built with four wings in the shape of a cross. The formal opening of the sanatorium was on 25 June 1904, with the ceremony performed by the Prince of Wales (later King George V), but because of unresolved problems regarding heating, plumbing and staff the first patients were not admitted until March 1905.

Marcus Paterson, who had been a house physician at the Brompton from 1901, accepted a post at Frimley in 1905, becoming the Medical Superintendent in January 1906. Paterson was known to say, "it would make them [the patients] more resistant to the disease by improving their physical condition." To this end, he introduced what was one of the first attempts at systematic rehabilitation, which involved patients in undertaking physical labour.

The sanitorium remained open as an outpatient site for mental health care into the 21st century. It closed in 2014 and the site was sold for housing development.

=== Later developments ===
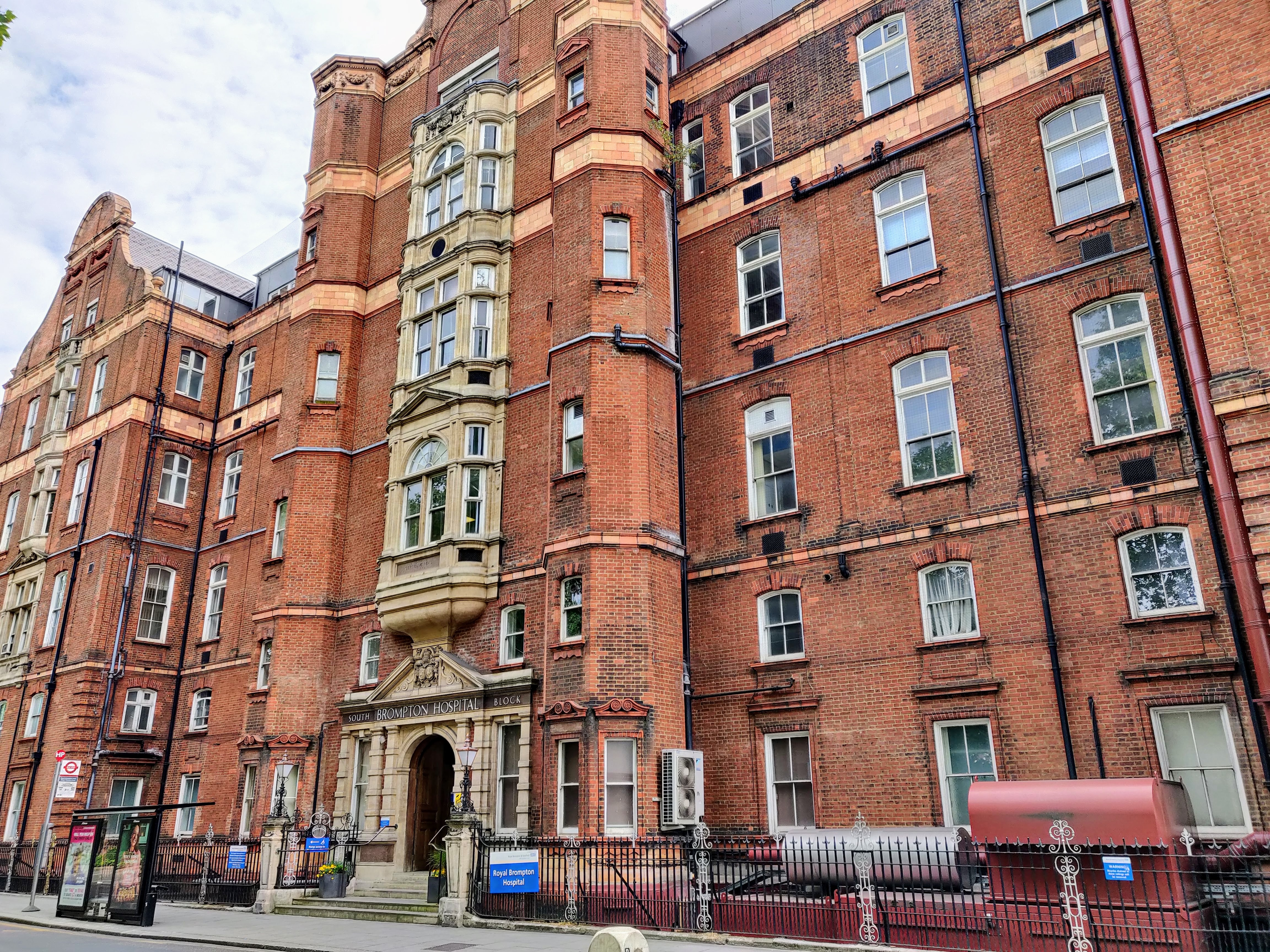
Fulham Wing

The Royal Brompton Hospital was extensively damaged by German bombing during the Second World War; it joined the National Health Service in 1948. A major research centre was created for the hospital on a site formerly occupied by St Wilfred's Convent in Cale Street in 1985.

The Brompton Fountain was established as a registered charity in 2005 to support paediatric patients of the hospital and their families.

The National Institute for Health and Care Research (NIHR) established a Respiratory Biomedical Research Unit at Royal Brompton Hospital in July 2010 and a Cardiovascular Biomedical Research Unit there in November 2010. Then, in November 2011, the Royal Brompton Hospital was named as one of only five hospitals in the country that would offer extra-corporeal membrane oxygenation (ECMO) to adults in an initiative that positions England as one of the leading countries in the world for the provision of this treatment.

== Notable physicians and nurses associated with The Brompton ==
Notable physicians and nurses associated with the hospital include:

- Sir Roger Gilbert Bannister, Athlete and neurologist, Junior member of staff at the hospital
- John Scott Burdon-Sanderson, Physician
- R. F. Patrick Cronin, Cardiologist
- Sandy Denny, Singer, began training as a nurse, mid-1960s
- Sir William Fergusson, FRS, Consulting Surgeon, 1843–1876
- Malcolm Green, Physician
- Robert Knox, Physician, 1856–1862
- Sir Joseph (later Lord) Lister, Consulting-Surgeon, 1891–1912
- Alicia Lloyd Still, DBE, RRC, Matron 1906 to 1909, founding member of the Royal College of Nursing
- Ivan Magill, anaesthetist, 1921-
- James Laidlaw Maxwell, Physician
- Shantilal Jamnadas Mehta, Indian surgeon and Padma Bhushan awardee
- Fanny J Pease, ARRC, nurse (1888-91, 1921-28) and militant suffragette
- Professor Philip Poole-Wilson, Cardiologist, Mackenzie medal
- Sir Richard Quain, Physician, 1848–1855
- Professor Jane Somerville, Cardiologist, Founder of the GUCH concept
- David Southall, Paediatrician
- Professor Sir Magdi Habib Yacoub, British Heart Foundation Professor of Cardiac Surgery

== See also ==
- Healthcare in London
- List of hospitals in England
- Brompton cocktail
