= Judith English =

British academic administrator (born 1940)

- Born: Judith Frances Milne; 1 March 1940 (age 86)
- Occupation: academic administrator
- Known for: principal of St Hilda's College, Oxford
- Spouse: Sir Terence English

Judith Frances English (nee Milne, born 1 March 1940) is a British academic administrator, the principal of St Hilda's College, Oxford, from 2001 to 2007.

== Career ==
English studied medicine at the University of Cambridge, graduating with MB and BChir degrees. She later qualified to join the Royal College of Physicians (MRCP) and the Royal College of Psychiatrists (MRCPsych). During her medical career she worked at a number of medical and academic institutions in the UK and the US, including the London Chest Hospital and Tufts University School of Medicine. In October 2000, it was announced that she was to move from her post in clinical psychiatry at Boston University to become principal of St Hilda's College, Oxford.

In 2006, under her leadership, St Hilda's which had been the last women-only college at Oxford, ended its 113-year ban on male students. Since 2010, English has been dean of scholars at the Oxford Centre for Islamic Studies.

== Recognition ==
English was elected as an Honorary Fellow of Girton College, Cambridge in 2004.

== Family ==
English was married to the cardiac surgeon, Sir Terence English, from 2002 until his death in 2025.
