= Walter Somerville =

British cardiologist

- Born: 2 October 1913; Dublin, Ireland
- Died: 20 July 2005 (aged 91)
- Education: University College, Dublin
- Medical career
- Profession: Cardiologist
- Field: Cardiology
- Institutions: Middlesex, Harefield
- Sub-specialties: Cardiology

Walter Somerville CBE (1913–2005) was an Irish cardiologist who played a leading role in heart surgery at London's Middlesex and Harefield hospitals.

For twenty years, Somerville was editor of the British Heart Journal.

== Early life and education ==
Walter Somerville was born on 2 October 1913 in Clontarf, a seaside suburb of Dublin. He received his early education at the Jesuit Belvedere College in Dublin. Aged 23, he qualified in medicine, surgery and obstetrics from the city's University College in 1937. He was appointed house physician at the Mater Misericordiae Hospital where he gained a degree as Doctor of Medicine.

== Military service ==
Somerville applied to join the RAF, but was instead enlisted in the army and sent to India. Indicating that he had no wish to become an army doctor, he was instead returned to Britain and seconded to the government's Chemical Warfare Establishment at Porton Down. In 1943, he was seconded to the US War Department, where he helped with preparations for the invasion of Japan, during which he was badly burned, and left with scars on his face, feet and legs. On leaving the army, a friend with connections in the pharmaceutical industry suggested Somerville might find a job there, but he turned the offer down, just as he did the MGM talent scout who offered him a screen test because of his English accent and good looks.

== Medical career ==
After being demobbed and returning to Britain, Somerville took a refresher course at Hammersmith Hospital, led by renowned cardiologist Paul Wood. Wood was impressed by Somerville and offered him the post of registrar at the hospital. In 1948 Somerville assisted Paul Wood with Britain's first cardiac catheterization.

In 1952, Somerville was appointed as a consultant at Harefield Hospital, and two years later assumed a similar role at the Middlesex Hospital.

Somerville was editor of the British Heart Journal for twenty years from 1973. The journal was the official publication of the British Cardiac Society, of which he was president from 1976 to 1981. He was responsible for encouraging greater links with cardiac experts in the US and Europe. After negotiating a better publishing deal with BMA Publications, he used the money towards the purchase of a house in London's Fitzroy Square, which was to become home to the British Cardiac Society.

== Personal life and death ==
In 1957 Somerville married Jane Platnauer. The couple had four children, and Jane Somerville became a world-renowned cardiologist in her own right. She now lives in London and lectures internationally.

Somerville died on 17 September 2005.

== Honours ==
In 1982 Dr. Somerville was appointed a CBE. The following year he was appointed by Queen Elizabeth as a consultant to the King Edward VII Convalescent Home in Osborne House on the Isle of Wight. He was also given the Legion of Merit for his wartime work for the US Army.
