= John Beavis =

John Beavis OBE
- Born: 8 June 1940; Brighton, Sussex, England
- Died: 5 December 2018 (aged 78)
- Medical career
- Profession: Surgeon
- Field: Orthopaedics

John Beavis OBE (8 June 1940 - 5 December 2018) was a British orthopaedic and trauma surgeon, known for his humanitarian work during retirement, when he trained surgeons in Sarajevo, Pakistan, Sri Lanka, and then Gaza, where he worked alongside Sir Terence English with the charity Medical Aid for Palestinians.

== Early life and education ==
John Beavis was born on 8 June 1940 in Brighton. He graduated from UCL Medical School in 1967.
