= GUCH =

GUCH is an acronym for Grown Up Congenital Heart, a group of adolescents and adults who, due to the advent of open heart surgery in the 1960s, are surviving the heart conditions they were born with. The concept was founded by paediatric cardiologist Jane Somerville, on realisation of their unmet needs.
