= Fabian Udekwu =

Nigerian cardiac surgeon

Professor Fabian Anene Ositadimma Udekwu M.D, FICS, FACS, FAATC, FNAS, FWACS
- Born: 1928; Enugwu Agidi, Anambra State, Nigeria
- Died: November 17, 2006 (aged 77–78); Uppsala, Sweden
- Occupation: Cardiothoracic surgeon
- Known for: First open heart surgery in West Africa
- Spouse: Anna Brita Bystrom

Academic background
- Education: Loyola University Chicago Stritch School of Medicine

Academic work
- Institutions: University of Ibadan, University of Nigeria Nsukka

Fabian Anene Ositadimma Udekwu // (1928 – 17 November 2006) born in Enugwu Agidi, Anambra State was a medical doctor and cardiac surgeon. He was a distinguished Professor of Surgery at the University of Nigeria Nsukka, and a pioneer of open-heart surgery in Africa.

== Education ==
Prof. Udekwu attended St. Charles Teachers Training College Onitsha where he was retained as a faculty member after graduation in 1947, teaching mathematics and geography. He did his London Matriculation Exams by correspondence and after having been able to save enough money he proceeded in 1950 to the United States for further studies. He did his premedical studies in biology, chemistry and physics in Los Angeles. Subsequently, he attended the Loyola University Chicago Stritch School of Medicine, graduating as a medical doctor in 1957 and specialising in general cardiac and thoracic surgery in 1964. He did his surgical training at Cook County Hospital in Chicago. Fabian Udekwu was the first fully certified cardiothoracic surgeon in Nigeria. He was a fellow of the American College of Surgeons, the American Association for Thoracic Surgery, the International College of Surgeons and the West African College of Surgeons. Udekwu was a founding member and fellow of the Nigerian Academy of Science.

== Career ==
Udekwu returned to Nigeria in 1965 as paediatric thoracic and cardiovascular surgeon at the University College Hospital of the University of Ibadan. He left Ibadan to Enugu at the outbreak of hostilities that marked the beginning of the Nigeria civil war. He served as a Military Surgeon and Head of the Biafran teaching hospital in various locations including Enugu and Emekukwu during the war. He was also the secretary to the Biafra Relief and Rehabilitation Association during the war. During the Biafra war he vehemently refused at his own peril to deny treatment to Nigerian soldiers despite the ongoing conflict; 'Ojukwu called me to his office to say I was wasting resources. I explained I had no choice due to my oath, not that the oath was determinant. I was trained by Jesuits, my duty was to serve'. His dogged adherence to the hippocratic oath resulted in continuous visits from Nigerian officers he saved during the war later, while still venerated by Biafran survivors decades later. Udekwu was integral to the reconstruction of the University of Nigeria Teaching Hospital Enugu, and later rated Distinguished Professor and Head of Department of Surgery of the University of Nigeria, Teaching Hospital (UNTH) and was the administrative head of the Enugu Campus of the University. Professor Udekwu is credited with building up the Department of Surgery of the University of Nigeria. Despite several unsuccessful attempts at sourcing funds to establish a modern surgical department from many organisations in the United States, United Kingdom, Scandinavia and through church aid, he was able to source funds for the Enugu campus by the contributions of individual Nigerians to build the operating theatre and buy the equipment needed to establish facilities for open-heart surgery in Nigeria. He was one of the pioneers that established cardiac surgery in Nigeria. Professor Udekwu led the team of surgeons that performed the first successful open-heart surgery in Nigeria in 1974 which was the first of its kind in black Africa. Also in the team of surgeons that performed this landmark operation were Professor Sir Magdi Yacoub, Professors Anyanwu C.H., Nwafor D.C., the anaesthetist Dr. Shreeniwas Jawalekar and others. This was followed by a series of six further open-heart surgeries under Udekwu at the University of Nigeria Teaching Hospital Enugu (UNTH) between 1974 and 1980.

== Private life ==
Udekwu was an avid sportsman, playing football and tennis throughout his life. He was a member of the Enugu Sports Club. He also played music as a hobby, attaining notability as the organist and choirmaster at the Holy Ghost Cathedral Enugu. On 28 April 1956 Udekwu was married to Miss Anna Brita Bystrom. They had ten children.

== Publications ==
- A Medical Holiday in Nigeria.
- Pancreatic Pseudocyst in Children
- Pulmonary aspergilloma: report of two cases from Nigeria.
- Determination of total body water with tritium oxide, FAO Udekwu, PD Kozoll, KA Meyer – Journal of nuclear Medicine, 1963
- Aneurysm of the left pulmonary artery with hemoptysis and bronchial obstruction.
- Initial experience with open-heart surgery in Nigeria, Anyanwu CH, Ihenacho HNC, Okoroma EO, Nwafo DC, Umeh BU, Okechukwu CC, Udekwu FA. Cardiologie Tropicale, Tropical Cardiology 1982;8:123–7.
- Studies of an alveolar soft tissue sarcoma.
- Renal angiomyolipoma. Clinical and pathological study.
- Traumatic aneurysms and arteriovenous fistulas in Nigeria.
- Clinical aspects of pulmonary and pleural carcinoma in Nigeria.
- Teratoma of the thyroid gland.
- Black grain mycetoma due to Madurella mycetomi: a case report from the East Central State of Nigeria.
- Ascending aortic aneurysm causing pulmonary stenosis.
- Odeku, E. L.; Antia, A. U.; Udekwu, F. A. O. (1970). "Persistent ascites following infected ventriculoperitoneal shunt". West African Medical Journal. 19: 72–73.
