= Hilton College =

Hilton College may refer to:

- Hilton College (South Africa), a high school in South Africa
- Hilton College of Hotel and Restaurant Management, an academic college of the University of Houston founded by Conrad Hilton
