= Keith Castle =

British heart transplant recipient

Keith Castle, at the age of 52, was the recipient of the first successful heart transplant operation to be carried out in the United Kingdom. The operation was performed in August 1979 at Papworth Hospital, Cambridgeshire by surgeon Sir Terence English, who would later describe Castle as a "wonderful man," but "not an ideal patient from a medical point of view" on account of Castle's vascular disease of the legs, peptic ulcer, and history of smoking. In the year following the transplant, the British Medical Journal published an article entitled "Function Of The Transplanted Heart" referencing the operation: "How well does the transplanted (and therefore denervated) heart perform? The immediate and practical answer is, well enough, as the activities of patients such as Mr Keith Castle have shown." Castle survived for more than five years after the operation, dying aged 58 in 1985.
