= Magdi Yacoub =

Egyptian-British surgeon (born 1935)

Sir Magdi Yacoub OM FRS
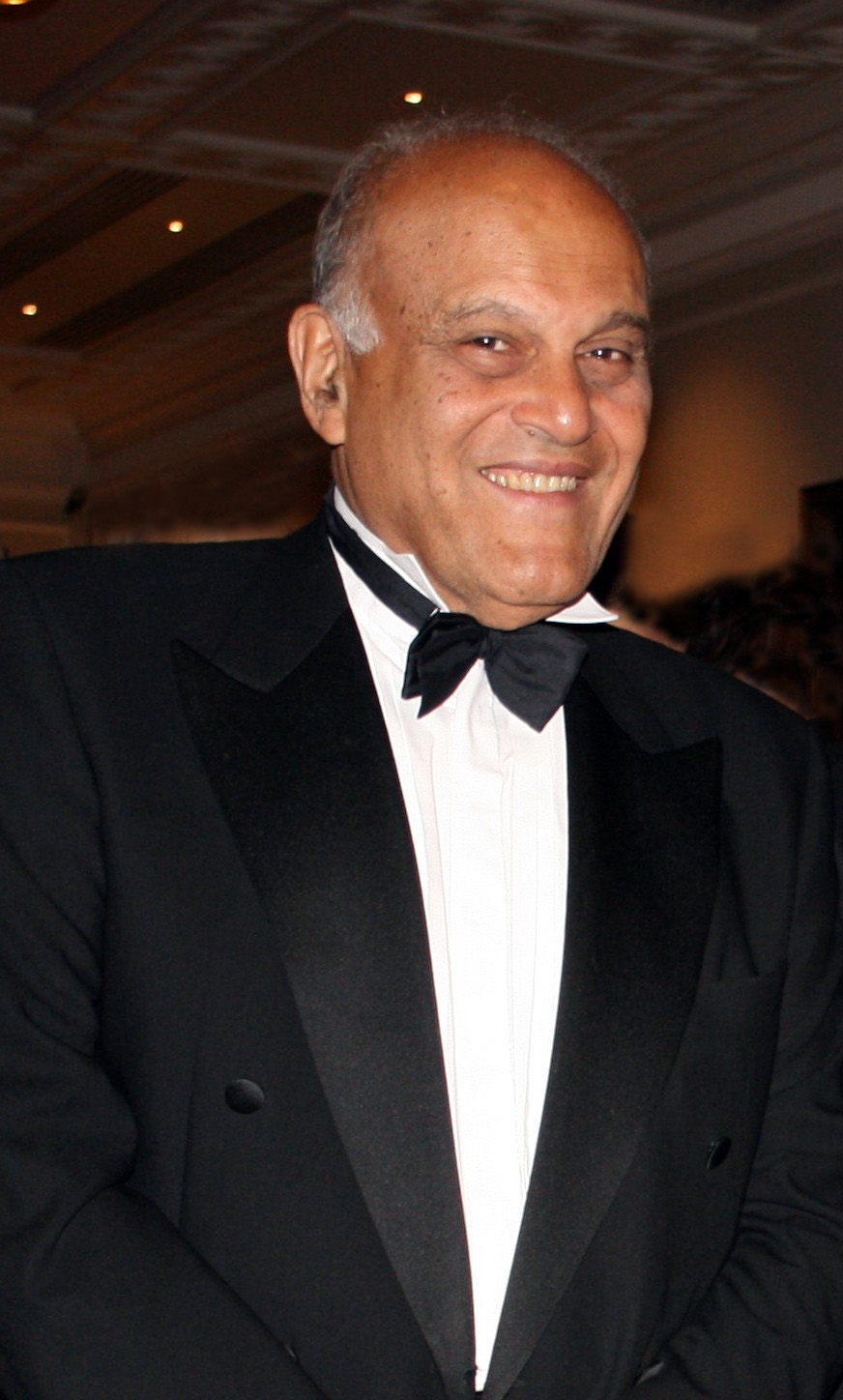
- Yacoub in 2008
- Born: 16 November 1935 (age 90); Bilbeis, Sharqia, Kingdom of Egypt
- Citizenship: United Kingdom; Egypt
- Education: Cairo University
- Known for: Establishing the heart transplantation centre at Harefield Hospital; Arterial switch operation in transposition of the great arteries; Ross-Yacoub procedure
- Spouse: Marianne Yacoub
- Children: 3
- Medical career
- Profession: Surgeon
- Institutions: University of Chicago; Harefield Hospital of Imperial College London
- Sub-specialties: Cardiothoracic surgery Heart transplantation
- Awards: Order of Merit; Knight Bachelor; Order of the Nile

Sir Magdi Habib Yacoub (Note: (Egyptian Arabic: مجدى حبيب يعقوب[ˈmæɡdi ħæˈbiːb jæʕˈʔuːb]; Coptic: Ⲙⲓϫⲇⲏ Ϩⲁⲃⲏⲃ Ⲓⲁⲕⲱⲃ)) (born 16 November 1935) is a Coptic Egyptian-British retired professor of cardiothoracic surgery at Imperial College London, best known for his early work in repairing heart valves with surgeon Donald Ross, adapting the Ross procedure, where the diseased aortic valve is replaced with the person's own pulmonary valve, devising the arterial switch operation (ASO) in transposition of the great arteries, and establishing the heart transplantation centre at Harefield Hospital in 1980 with a heart transplant for Derrick Morris, who at the time of his death was Europe's longest-surviving heart transplant recipient. Yacoub subsequently performed the UK's first combined heart and lung transplant in 1983.

From 1986 to 2006, he held the position of British Heart Foundation Professor of Cardiothoracic Surgery at the National Heart and Lung Institute, Imperial College Faculty of Medicine. He is the founding editor of the journal Disease Models & Mechanisms.

His honours and awards include the Bradshaw Lecture from the Royal College of Physicians in 1988, a knighthood in the 1992 New Year Honours, the Texas Heart Institute's Ray C. Fish Award for Scientific Achievement in Cardiovascular Disease in 1998, the International Society for Heart and Lung Transplantation Lifetime Achievement Award in 2004, the European Society of Cardiology's gold medal in 2006, the Order of Merit in 2014, and the Lister Medal from the Royal College of Surgeons in 2015.

After retiring from the National Health Service (NHS), he continued to practice paediatric surgery through his charity, Chain of Hope. In 2008, he co-founded the Magdi Yacoub Heart Foundation, which initiated the Aswan Heart Project.

== Early life and education ==
Magdi Habib Yacoub was born on 16 November 1935 in Bilbeis, El Sharqia, Egypt to a Coptic Christian family, and spent his childhood moving around a number of different small towns. His father was a surgeon who later worked in public health and died in 1958. Yacoub later recalled that both his father and the death of his youngest aunt, who was just 22 years old and died from uncorrected mitral stenosis during childbirth, inspired him to study medicine and cardiology. He recalled, "This young woman would not have died if we had had access to facilities which were then available in a few centres around the world."

At the age of 15, he entered the Cairo University School of Medicine with a scholarship.

== Early surgical career ==
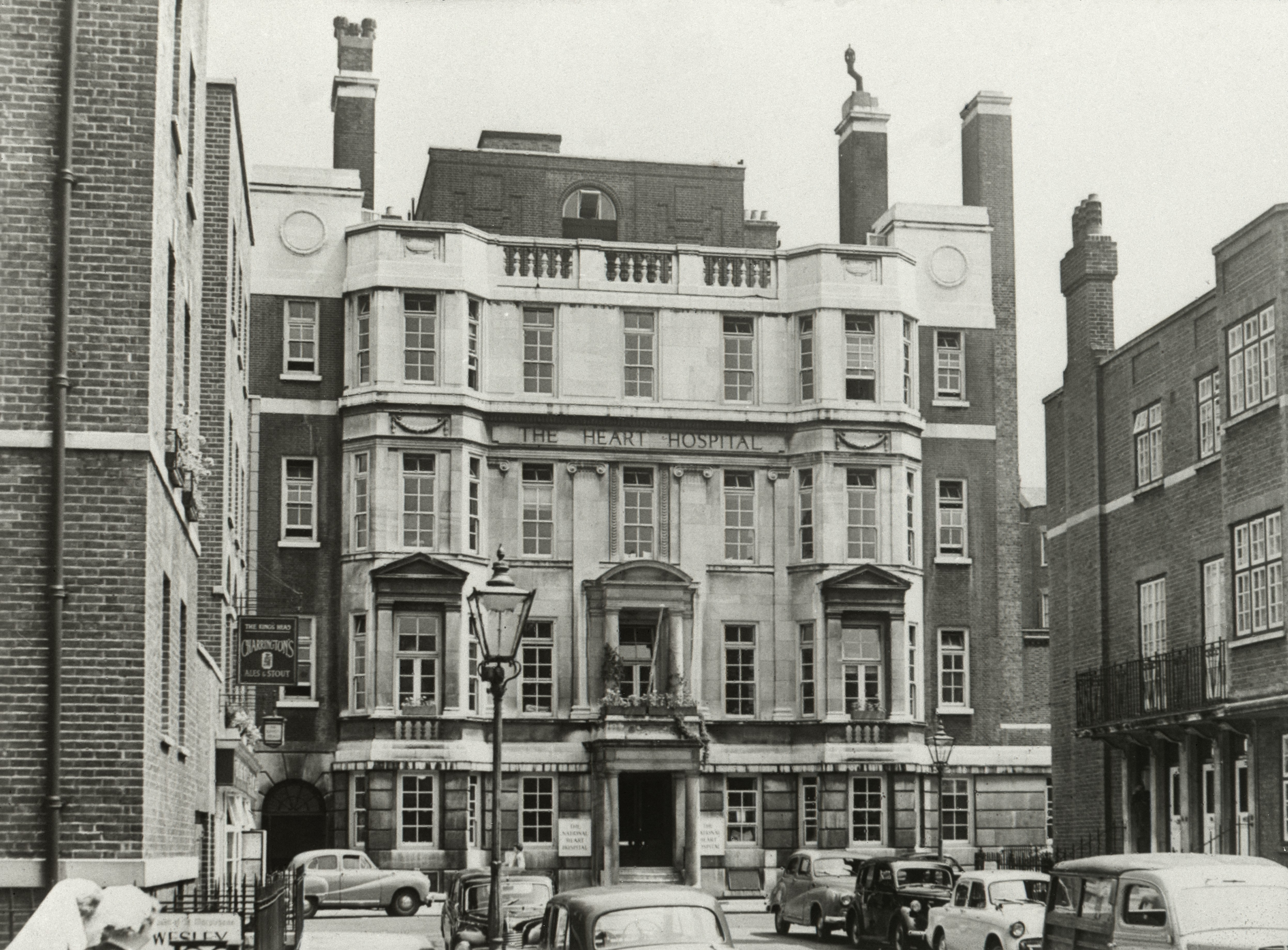
National Heart Hospital, Westmoreland street

In 1957, Yacoub graduated in medicine from Cairo University and completed two years of medical residency in surgery. In 1961 or 1962, he moved to Britain to continue a fellowship under Sir Russell Brock, consultant surgeon at Guy's Hospital.

=== Heart valve surgery ===
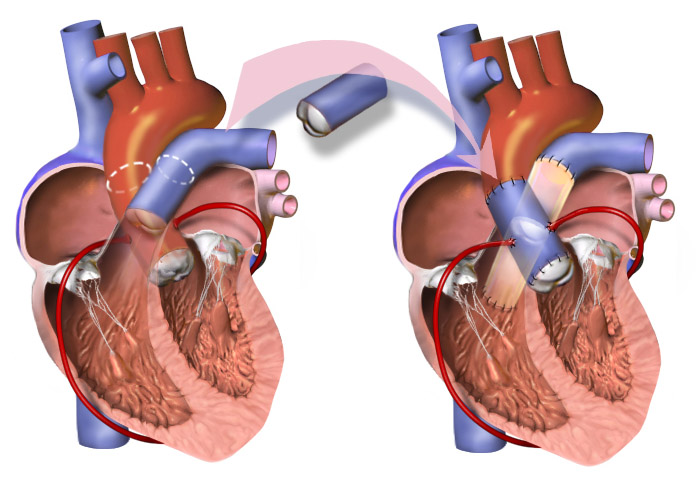
Ross Procedure

In 1964, he was appointed rotating surgical senior registrar to the National Heart and Chest Hospitals, where he worked with cardiothoracic surgeon Donald Ross. Here, they worked on repairing heart valves in people with severe valvular heart disease and heart failure. Four of their cases, operated on between December 1965 and October 1967, were reported on in the British Medical Journal (1968) in an article titled "Too ill for cardiac surgery?". Three had severe aortic valve disease and one had rheumatic heart disease with multiple affected valves. All four had a poor prognosis with death expected within a few days and all four survived surgery. He carried out a number of Ross procedures, where the diseased aortic valve is replaced with the person's own pulmonary valve, particularly in growing children. It became a popular alternative to the surgical treatment of aortic valve disease in young adults and avoided the need for anticoagulation and repeated operations. Yacoub modified the operation by planning remodelling of the autograft root, the Ross-Yacoub procedure, performed in carefully selected people. At a time when cardiologists may have been reluctant to refer for surgery, Yacoub's search for operable people earned him the name "Magdi's midnight stars".

Later, his application for a position at the Royal Brompton Hospital was rejected. In 1968, he moved to the United States, and the following year, he became an Instructor and then an assistant professor at the University of Chicago.

== Harefield Hospital ==
In 1973, he became a consultant cardiothoracic surgeon at Harefield Hospital, West London, opened in 1921 as a TB sanatorium of single storey pavilions typical for such a hospital. He later recalled, "I was tempted to stay in Chicago, as I was interested in the research they were doing there, but I had already accepted the position at Harefield before going to the US, so I was honour bound to return". At Harefield, he worked closely with Rosemary Radley-Smith, consultant in paediatric cardiology.

As a visiting professor to the University of Nigeria, Nsukka, Yacoub, Fabian Udekwu, C. H. Anyanwu, and others formed part of the team that performed the first open heart surgery in Nigeria in 1974.

=== Arterial Switch ===
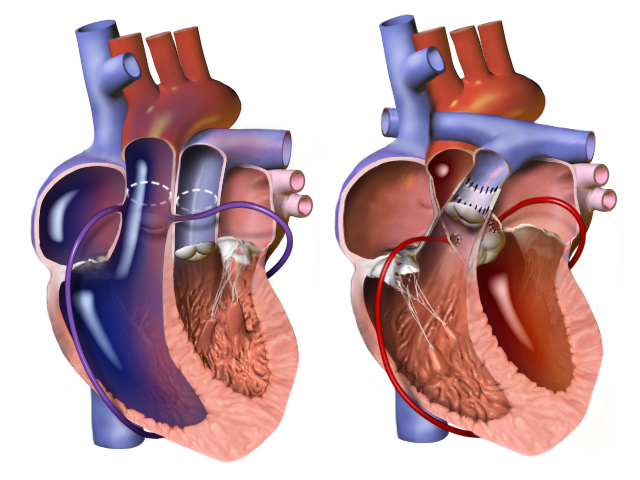
Arterial switch operation

In 1977, he devised a two-stage approach for an arterial switch operation (ASO) in older people with transposition of the great arteries with an intact ventricular septum (IVS).

=== Harefield Hospital transplant unit ===
Yacoub began the transplant programme at Harefield Hospital in 1980 with a heart transplant for Derrick Morris, who became Europe's longest surviving heart transplant recipient until his death in July 2005. Two years later, he performed a heart transplant on John McCafferty, who survived for more than 33 years, until 10 February 2016 and became recognised as the world's longest surviving heart transplant patient by the Guinness World Records in 2013, surpassing the previous Guinness World Record of 30 years, 11 months and 10 days set by an American man who died in 2009.

In December 1983, Yacoub performed the UK's first combined heart and lung transplant at Harefield.

From 1986 to 2006, he held the position of British Heart Foundation Professor of Cardiothoracic Surgery at the National Heart and Lung Institute, Imperial College Faculty of Medicine. In 1988, he became a member of the Royal Colleges of Physicians, twenty years after qualifying in surgery.

He is the founding editor of the journal Disease Models & Mechanisms.

He treated a number of politicians and celebrities throughout his surgical career, including comedian Eric Morecambe in 1979, Greek prime minister Andreas Papandreou in 1988, and actor Omar Sharif in 1993.

== Later career ==
He retired from the National Health Service in 2001 at the age of 65.

In 2006, he led a complex operation that involved removing a transplant heart from Hannah Clark, whose own heart had recovered. The original heart had not been removed during the transplant surgery nearly a decade earlier, with the hope that it might eventually recover.

In April 2007, it was reported that a British medical research team led by Yacoub had grown part of a human heart valve from stem cells.

In January 2025, he unveiled a revolutionary "living valve" for heart patients. The biodegradable valve would integrate with the body, allowing cells to form a fully functional, natural valve that would grow with the patient, reducing the need for future surgeries and immune rejection.

In March 2025, he was interviewed by Jim Al-Khalili for the BBC's The Life Scientific.

== Charities ==
In 1996, Yacoub founded the charity "Chain of Hope" in honor of Ahmed Sherif, through which he continued to perform surgeries on children. This organization facilitates heart surgery for correctable heart defects in areas lacking specialist cardiac surgery units.

He is also the head of the Magdi Yacoub Global Heart Foundation, co-founded with Ahmed Zewail and Ambassador Mohamed Shaker in 2008, which launched the Aswan Heart project and founded the Aswan Heart Centre the following year.

== Honours and awards ==
- 1988: Bradshaw Lecture, Royal College of Physicians. It was held in Sheffield.
- 1998: Texas Heart Institute Ray C. Fish Award for Scientific Achievement in Cardiovascular Disease.
- 1998: Elected Fellow of the Academy of Medical Sciences (FMedSci).
- 1999: Elected Fellow of the Royal Society (FRS).
- 1999: Lifetime outstanding achievement award in recognition of contribution to medicine, Secretary of State for Health (UK).
- 2003: Golden Hippocrates International Award for Excellence in Cardiac Surgery (Moscow).
- WHO Prize for Humanitarian Services.
- 2004: International Society for Heart and Lung Transplantation Lifetime Achievement Award, at the 24th annual meeting in San Francisco.
- 2006: Hamdan Award for Volunteers in Humanitarian Medical Services.
- 2006: European Society of Cardiology Gold Medal.
- 2007: Pride of Britain Award.
- 2007: Honorary citizenships of the city of Bergamo, Italy
- 2007: Medal of Merit, President, International Academy of Cardiovascular Sciences.
- 2011: Order of the Nile for science and humanity.
- 2012: American College of Cardiology Legend of Cardiovascular Medicine.
- 2015: Lister Medal for contributions to surgical science, presented by Clare Marx, President of the Royal College of Surgeons.
- Yacoub was knighted in the 1992 New Year Honours and appointed to the Order of Merit in the 2014 New Year Honours.

== Personal and family ==
He was married to Marianne and they had three children and several grandchildren. During an appearance on the BBC's The Life Scientific in March 2025, he revealed that his wife had died. Marianne's family was from East Germany and escaped across the Berlin Wall to Hamburg. She later moved to the UK and worked as an auxiliary nurse at the Royal Brompton Hospital, where she met Yacoub. They were married at the University of Chicago in the USA after Marianne followed him there.

Yacoub enjoys swimming, listening to classical music, and growing orchids.

== Selected publications ==
=== Books ===
- Annual of Cardiac Surgery. Current Science (1994). ISBN 9781859221433. J. Pepper (Ed)
- Cardiac Valve Allografts : Science and Practice. Steinkopff-Verlag Heidelberg (1997). ISBN 9783642592508. With A. C. Yankah and R. Hetzer

=== Articles ===
- Yacoub, MH (1966). "Vagotomy through mediastinoscopy for pulmonary osteoarthropathy". Br J Dis Chest. 60 (3): 144–7. doi:10.1016/s0007-0971(66)80032-3. PMID 5967955.
- Ross, D; Yacoub, MH (1969). "Homograft replacement of the aortic valve. A critical review". Prog Cardiovasc Dis. 11 (4): 275–93. doi:10.1016/0033-0620(69)90054-1. PMID 4884690.
- Yacoub, MH; Radley-Smith, R; Maclaurin, R (1977). "Two-stage operation for anatomical correction of transposition of the great arteries with intact interventricular septum". Lancet. 1 (8025): 1275–8. doi:10.1016/s0140-6736(77)91317-4. PMID 68381.
- Yacoub; et al. (1995). "Fourteen-year experience with homovital homografts for aortic valve replacement". The Journal of Thoracic and Cardiovascular Surgery. 110 (1): 186–194. doi:10.1016/S0022-5223(05)80025-X. PMID 7609543.
- Yacoub, Magdi H. (1995). "Two Hearts That Beat as One". Circulation. 92 (2): 156–157. doi:10.1161/01.CIR.92.2.156. PMID 7600645.
- Yacoub, MH; Klieverik, LM; Melina, G; et al. (July 2006). "An evaluation of the Ross operation in adults". J. Heart Valve Dis. 15 (4): 531–9. PMID 16901050.. Yacoub et al.
- Treasure, T.; Hasan, A.; Yacoub, M. (2011). "Is there a risk in avoiding risk for younger patients with aortic valve disease?". BMJ. 342 d2466. doi:10.1136/bmj.d2466. PMID 21622509.
- Yacoub, M; El-Hamamsy, I (2014). "The Ross operation in infants and children, when and how?". Heart. 100 (24): 1905–6. doi:10.1136/heartjnl-2014-306453. PMC 4251164. PMID 25324536.
