= Harefield Hospital =

Coordinates: 51.607°N 0.483°W

- Guy's and St Thomas' NHS Foundation Trust
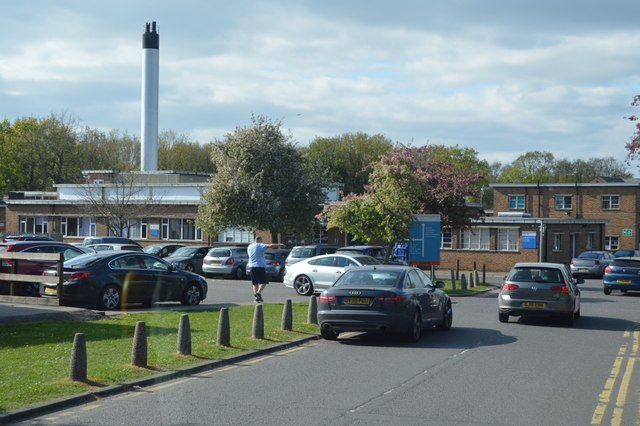
- Harefield Hospital

- Location within Hillingdon

Geography
- Location: Harefield, Greater London, England, United Kingdom

Organisation
- Care system: NHS England
- Type: Specialist
- Affiliated university: National Heart and Lung Institute at Imperial College, London

Services
- Emergency department: No Accident & Emergency
- Beds: 168
- Speciality: Cardiothoracic surgery including transplantation; cardiology; respiratory medicine

History
- Founded: 1937

Links
- Website: http://www.rbht.nhs.uk/about/our-work/harefield
- Lists: Hospitals in England

Harefield Hospital is a health institution in Harefield, London Borough of Hillingdon, England. It is managed by the Guy's and St Thomas' NHS Foundation Trust.

== History ==
The first hospital on the site was the No. 1 Australian Auxiliary Hospital established during the First World War to treat injured Australians and New Zealander soldiers. After the war Middlesex County Council decided to use the site to build a series of single-storey pavilions which opened as the Harefield Sanatorium in October 1921.

Work started on a more permanent structure in 1935 and the new building was opened on 8 October 1937 by the Duke of Gloucester, with many of the wards featuring large open areas to give patients access to the fresh air. The hospital joined the National Health Service in 1948.

Amongst the hospital's roll call of distinguished cardiologists were Paul Wood and Walter Somerville. Arguably, the hospital's most famous surgeon was Professor Sir Magdi Yacoub, who performed the UK's first heart and lung transplant at Harefield in 1983. Under the leadership of Sir Magdi Yacoub, the Harefield Hospital transplant programme had begun in 1980 and by the end of the decade he and his team had performed one thousand of the procedures, while the hospital had become the leading UK transplant centre.

== Facilities ==
The hospital advertises as being "one of the largest and most experienced centres in the world for heart and lung transplants" and having "jointly pioneered work in the development of 'artificial hearts' (also known as left ventricular assist devices or LVADs)". The grounds of the hospital also house the Harefield Heart Science Centre, where research is performed into the causes and treatments of heart disease.

== See also ==
- Derrick Morris, received heart transplant at Harefield, became Europe's longest surviving recipient
- List of hospitals in England
