= Bioptome =

Surgical instrument

A bioptome is a small pincer-shaped cutting/grasping instrument used in medicine for taking endomyocardial biopsy specimens of the heart muscle following heart transplantation in rejection monitoring and for diagnosing some diseases of the heart.

== Technique ==
It is flexible and usually operated under the guidance of fluoroscopy or echocardiography.

== History ==
Since 1962, many modifications to the device and techniques in its use have been made.
