= Cardiothoracic surgery =

Medical specialty involved in surgical treatment of organs inside the thorax

Cardiothoracic Surgeon
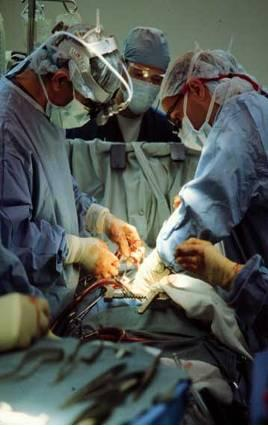
- Cardiothoracic surgeon performs an operation.

Occupation
- Names: Doctor; Surgeon
- Occupation type: Specialty
- Activity sectors: Medicine, Surgery

Description
- Education required: Doctor of Medicine (MD); Doctor of Osteopathic medicine (DO); Bachelor of Medicine, Bachelor of Surgery (MBBS, MBChB); Master of Surgery (MS); Master of Chirurgiae (MCh); Diplomate of National Board (DNB); Doctorate of National Board (DrNB)
- Fields of employment: Hospitals, Clinics

Cardiothoracic (CT) surgery is the field of medicine involved in surgical treatment of organs inside the thoracic cavity — generally treatment of conditions of the heart (heart disease), lungs (lung disease), and other pleural or mediastinal structures.

In most countries, cardiothoracic surgery is further subspecialized into cardiac surgery (involving the heart and the great vessels) and thoracic surgery (involving the lungs, esophagus, thymus, etc.); the exceptions are the United States, Australia, New Zealand, the United Kingdom, India and some European Union countries such as Portugal.

== Training ==
A cardiac surgery residency typically comprises anywhere from four to six years (or longer) of training to become a fully qualified surgeon. Cardiac surgery training may be combined with thoracic surgery and/or vascular surgery and called cardiovascular (CV) / cardiothoracic (CT) / cardiothoracic vascular (CTVS) surgery. Cardiac surgeons may enter a cardiac surgery residency directly from medical school, or first complete a general surgery residency followed by a fellowship. Cardiac surgeons may further sub-specialize cardiac surgery by doing a fellowship in a variety of topics including pediatric cardiac surgery, cardiac transplantation, adult-acquired heart disease, weak heart issues, and many more problems in the heart.

=== Australia and New Zealand ===
The highly competitive Surgical Education and Training (SET) program in Cardiothoracic Surgery is six years in duration, usually commencing several years after completing medical school. Training is administered and supervised via a bi-national (Australia and New Zealand) training program. Multiple examinations take place throughout the course of training, culminating in a final fellowship exam in the final year of training. Upon completion of training, surgeons are awarded a Fellowship of the Royal Australasian College of Surgeons (FRACS), denoting that they are qualified specialists. Trainees having completed a training program in General Surgery and have obtained their FRACS will have the option to complete fellowship training in Cardiothoracic Surgery of four years in duration, subject to college approval. It takes around eight to ten years minimum of post-graduate (post-medical school) training to qualify as a cardiothoracic surgeon. Competition for training places and for public (teaching) hospital places is very high currently, leading to concerns regarding workforce planning in Australia.

=== Canada ===
Historically, cardiac surgeons in Canada completed general surgery followed by a fellowship in CV / CT / CVT. During the 1990s, the Canadian cardiac surgery training programs changed to six-year "direct-entry" programs following medical school. The direct-entry format provides residents with experience related to cardiac surgery they would not receive in a general surgery program (e.g. echocardiography, coronary care unit, cardiac catheterization etc.). Residents in this program will also spend time training in thoracic and vascular surgery. Typically, this is followed by a fellowship in either Adult Cardiac Surgery, Heart Failure/Transplant, Minimally Invasive Cardiac Surgery, Aortic Surgery, Thoracic Surgery, Pediatric Cardiac Surgery or Cardiac ICU. Contemporary Canadian candidates completing general surgery and wishing to pursue cardiac surgery often complete a cardiothoracic surgery fellowship in the United States. The Royal College of Physicians and Surgeons of Canada also provides a three-year cardiac surgery fellowship for qualified general surgeons that is offered at several training sites including the University of Alberta, the University of British Columbia and the University of Toronto.

Thoracic surgery is its own separate 2–3 year fellowship of general or cardiac surgery in Canada.

Cardiac surgery programs in Canada:

- University of Alberta – 1 position
- University of British Columbia – 1 position
- University of Calgary – 1 position
- Dalhousie University – 1 position every other year
- Université Laval – 1 position every three years
- University of Manitoba – 1 position
- McGill University – 1 position every three years
- McMaster University – 1 position every other year
- Université de Montréal – 1 position every three years
- University of Ottawa – 1 position
- University of Toronto – 1 position
- Western University – 1 position

=== United States ===
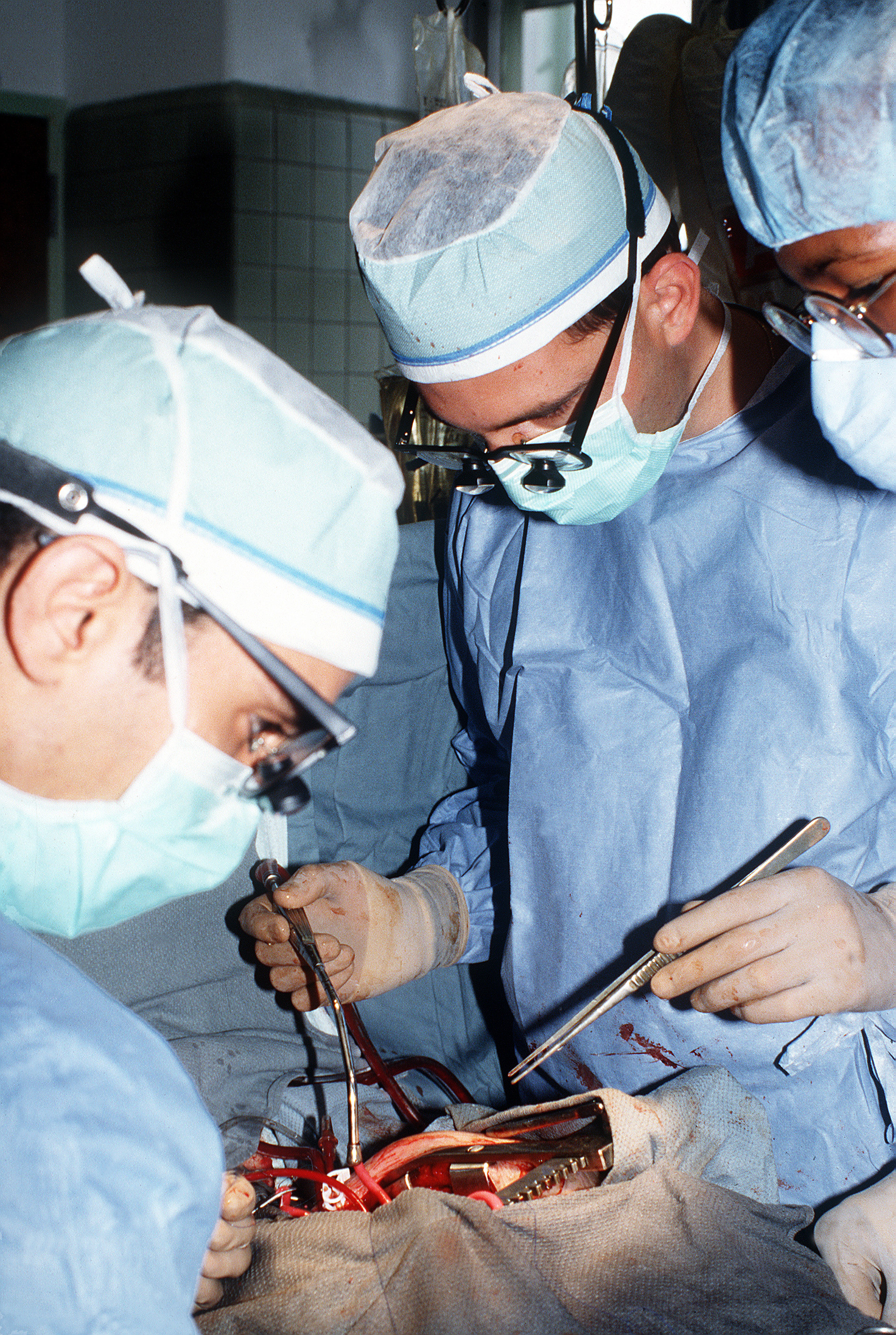
Surgeon operating

Cardiac surgery training in the United States is combined with general thoracic surgery and called cardiothoracic surgery or thoracic surgery. A cardiothoracic surgeon in the U.S. is a physician who first completes a general surgery residency (typically 5–7 years), followed by a cardiothoracic surgery fellowship (typically 2–3 years). The cardiothoracic surgery fellowship typically spans two or three years, but certification is based on the number of surgeries performed as the operating surgeon, not the time spent in the program, in addition to passing rigorous board certification tests. Two other pathways to shorten the duration of training have been developed: (1) a combined general-thoracic surgery residency consisting of four years of general surgery training and three years of cardiothoracic training at the same institution and (2) an integrated six-year cardiothoracic residency (in place of the general surgery residency plus cardiothoracic residency), which have each been established at many programs (over 20). Applicants match into the integrated six-year (I-6) programs directly out of medical school, and the application process has been extremely competitive for these positions as there were approximately 160 applicants for 10 spots in the U.S. in 2010. As of May 2013, there are 20 approved programs, which include the following:

Integrated six-year Cardiothoracic Surgery programs in the United States:

- Medical College of Wisconsin
- Stanford University – two positions
- University of North Carolina at Chapel Hill
- University of Virginia
- Columbia University – two positions
- University of Pennsylvania
- University of Pittsburgh – two positions
- University of Washington
- Northwestern University
- Mount Sinai Hospital, New York
- University of Maryland
- University of California, Los Angeles UCLA – two resident positions, one Transplant Fellowship; one Congenital resident position
- University of Texas Health Science Center at San Antonio
- Medical University of South Carolina
- University of Southern California – two positions
- University of Rochester
- University of California, Davis
- Indiana University
- University of Kentucky
- Emory University
- University of Michigan
- Yale University
- Ohio State University

The American Board of Thoracic Surgery offers a special pathway certificate in congenital cardiac surgery which typically requires an additional year of fellowship. This formal certificate is unique because congenital cardiac surgeons in other countries do not have formal evaluation and recognition of pediatric training by a licensing body.

== Cardiac surgery ==
Cardiac surgery
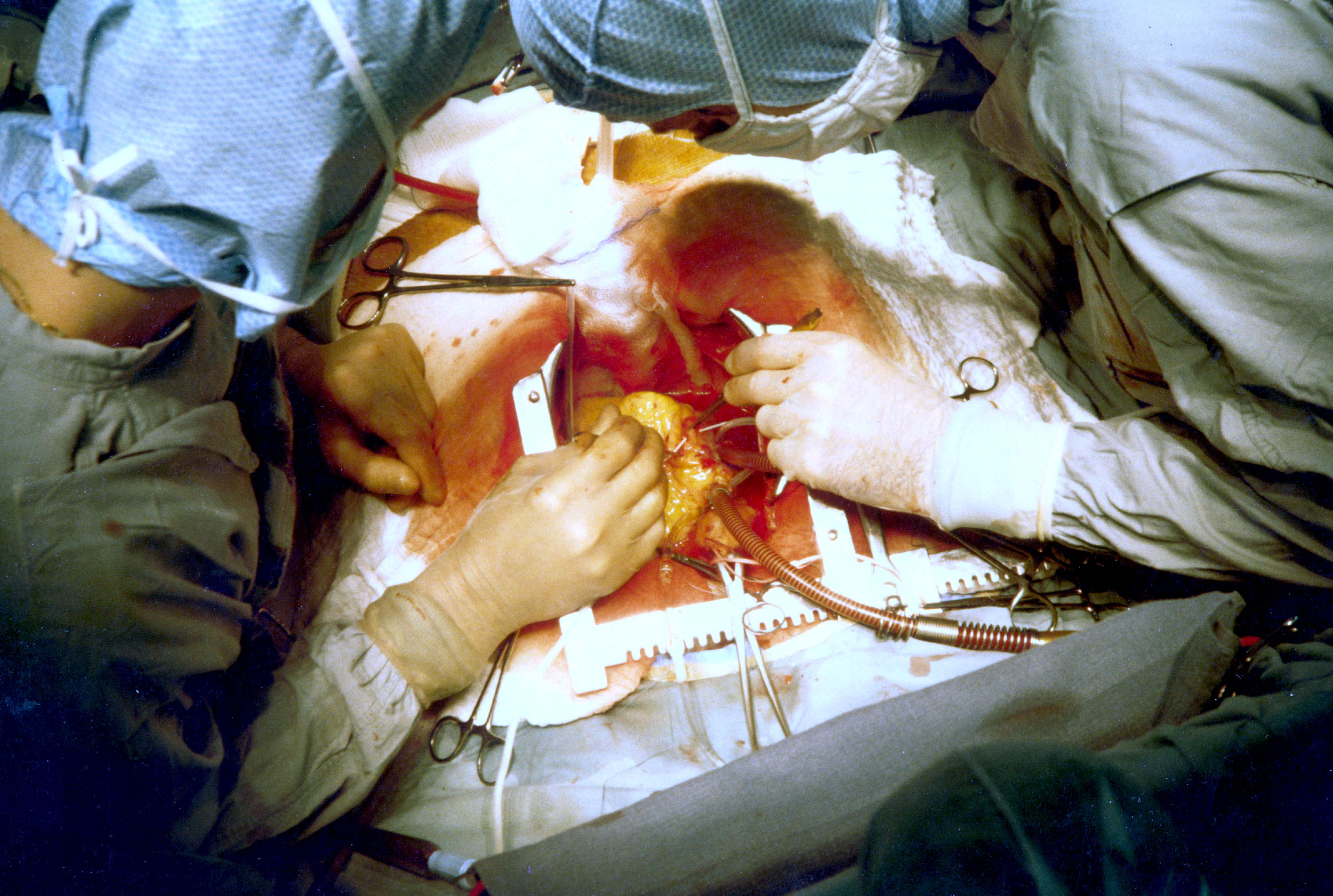
- Two cardiac surgeons performing a cardiac surgery known as coronary artery bypass surgery. Note the use of a steel retractor to forcefully maintain the exposure of the patient's heart.
- ICD-9-CM: 35–37
- MeSH: D006348
- OPS-301 code: 5-35...5-37

The earliest operations on the pericardium (the sac that surrounds the heart) took place in the 19th century and were performed by Francisco Romero (1801) Dominique Jean Larrey, Henry Dalton, and Daniel Hale Williams. The first surgery on the heart itself was performed by Norwegian surgeon Axel Cappelen on 4 September 1895 at Rikshospitalet in Kristiania, now Oslo. He ligated a bleeding coronary artery in a 24-year-old man who had been stabbed in the left axilla and was in deep shock upon arrival. Access was through a left thoracotomy. The patient awoke and seemed fine for 24 hours, but became ill with increasing temperature and he ultimately died from what the post mortem proved to be mediastinitis on the third postoperative day. The first successful surgery of the heart, performed without any complications, was by Ludwig Rehn of Frankfurt, Germany, who repaired a stab wound to the right ventricle on September 7, 1896.

Surgery in great vessels (aortic coarctation repair, Blalock-Taussig shunt creation, closure of patent ductus arteriosus) became common after the turn of the century and falls in the domain of cardiac surgery, but technically cannot be considered heart surgery. One of the more commonly known cardiac surgery procedures is the coronary artery bypass graft (CABG), also known as "bypass surgery."

=== Early approaches to heart malformations ===
In 1925 operations on the heart valves were unknown. Henry Souttar operated successfully on a young woman with mitral stenosis. He made an opening in the appendage of the left atrium and inserted a finger into this chamber in order to palpate and explore the damaged mitral valve. The patient survived for several years but Souttar's physician colleagues at that time decided the procedure was not justified and he could not continue.

Cardiac surgery changed significantly after World War II. In 1948 four surgeons carried out successful operations for mitral stenosis resulting from rheumatic fever. Horace Smithy (1914–1948) revived an operation due to Dr Dwight Harken of the Peter Bent Brigham Hospital using a punch to remove a portion of the mitral valve. Charles Bailey (1910–1993) at the Hahnemann Hospital, Philadelphia, Dwight Harken in Boston and Russell Brock at Guy's Hospital all adopted Souttar's method. All these men started work independently of each other, within a few months. This time Souttar's technique was widely adopted although there were modifications.

In 1947 Thomas Holmes Sellors (1902–1987) of the Middlesex Hospital operated on a Fallot's Tetralogy patient with pulmonary stenosis and successfully divided the stenosed pulmonary valve. In 1948, Russell Brock, probably unaware of Sellor's work, used a specially designed dilator in three cases of pulmonary stenosis. Later in 1948 he designed a punch to resect the infundibular muscle stenosis which is often associated with Fallot's Tetralogy. Many thousands of these "blind" operations were performed until the introduction of heart bypass made direct surgery on valves possible.

=== Open heart surgery ===
Open heart surgery is a procedure in which the patient's heart is opened and surgery is performed on the internal structures of the heart. It was discovered by Wilfred G. Bigelow of the University of Toronto that the repair of intracardiac pathologies was better done with a bloodless and motionless environment, which means that the heart should be stopped and drained of blood. The first successful intracardiac correction of a congenital heart defect using hypothermia was performed by C. Walton Lillehei and F. John Lewis at the University of Minnesota on September 2, 1952. The following year, Soviet surgeon Aleksandr Aleksandrovich Vishnevskiy conducted the first cardiac surgery under local anesthesia.

Surgeons realized that the limitations of hypothermia – complex intracardiac repairs take more time and the patient needs blood flow to the body, particularly to the brain. The patient needs the function of the heart and lungs provided by an artificial method, hence the term cardiopulmonary bypass. John Heysham Gibbon at Jefferson Medical School in Philadelphia reported in 1953 the first successful use of extracorporeal circulation by means of an oxygenator, but he abandoned the method, disappointed by subsequent failures. In 1954 Lillehei realized a successful series of operations with the controlled cross-circulation technique in which the patient's mother or father was used as a 'heart-lung machine'. John W. Kirklin at the Mayo Clinic in Rochester, Minnesota started using a Gibbon type pump-oxygenator in a series of successful operations, and was soon followed by surgeons in various parts of the world.

Nazih Zuhdi performed the first total intentional hemodilution open heart surgery on Terry Gene Nix, age 7, on February 25, 1960, at Mercy Hospital, Oklahoma City, OK. The operation was a success; however, Nix died three years later in 1963. In March, 1961, Zuhdi, Carey, and Greer, performed open heart surgery on a child, age 3 1/2, using the total intentional hemodilution machine. In 1985 Zuhdi performed Oklahoma's first successful heart transplant on Nancy Rogers at Baptist Hospital. The transplant was successful, but Rogers, who had cancer, died from an infection 54 days after surgery.

=== Modern beating-heart surgery ===
Since the 1990s, surgeons have begun to perform "off-pump bypass surgery" – coronary artery bypass surgery without the aforementioned cardiopulmonary bypass. In these operations, the heart is beating during surgery, but is stabilized to provide an almost still work area in which to connect the conduit vessel that bypasses the blockage; in the U.S., most conduit vessels are harvested endoscopically, using a technique known as endoscopic vessel harvesting (EVH).

Some researchers believe that the off-pump approach results in fewer post-operative complications, such as postperfusion syndrome, and better overall results. Study results are controversial as of 2007, the surgeon's preference and hospital results still play a major role.

=== Minimally invasive surgery ===
A new form of heart surgery that has grown in popularity is robot-assisted heart surgery. This is where a machine is used to perform surgery while being controlled by the heart surgeon. The main advantage to this is the size of the incision made in the patient. Instead of an incision being at least big enough for the surgeon to put his hands inside, it does not have to be bigger than "pencil-sized" holes for the robot's much smaller "hands" to enter a surgical patient's body.

In September 2024, the first successful fully robotic heart transplant took place at King Faisal Specialist Hospital and Research Centre in Riyadh, led by surgeon Feras Khaliel, head of the hospital's cardiac surgery and director of its Robotics and Minimally Invasive Surgery Program. In December 2024, the first robotic surgery for a combined robotic aortic valve replacement (AVR) and coronary artery bypass grafting (CABG) was successfully performed through one small incision at West Virginia University, led by surgeon Vinay Badhwar, who is the executive chair of the WVU Heart and Vascular Institute and a vice president of the Society of Thoracic Surgeons.

=== Pediatric cardiovascular surgery ===
Pediatric cardiovascular surgery is surgery of the heart of children. The first operations to repair cardio-vascular defects in children were performed by Clarence Crafoord in Sweden when he repaired coarctation of the aorta in a 12-year-old boy. The first attempts to palliate congenital heart disease were performed by Alfred Blalock with the assistance of William Longmire, Denton Cooley, and Blalock's experienced technician, Vivien Thomas in 1944 at Johns Hopkins Hospital. Techniques for repair of congenital heart defects without the use of a bypass machine were developed in the late 1940s and early 1950s. Among them was an open repair of an atrial septal defect using hypothermia, inflow occlusion and direct vision in a 5-year-old child performed in 1952 by Lewis and Lillihei. Lillihei used cross-circulation between a boy and his father to maintain perfusion while performing a direct repair of a ventricular septal defect in a 4-year-old child in 1954. He continued to use cross-circulation and performed the first corrections of tetralogy of Fallot and presented those results in 1955 at the American Surgical Association. In the long-run, pediatric cardiovascular surgery would rely on the cardiopulmonary bypass machine developed by Gibbon and Lillehei as noted above.

=== Risks of cardiac surgery ===
The development of cardiac surgery and cardiopulmonary bypass techniques has reduced the mortality rates of these surgeries to relatively low ranks. For instance, repairs of congenital heart defects are currently estimated to have 4–6% mortality rates. A major concern with cardiac surgery is the incidence of neurological damage. Stroke occurs in 5% of all people undergoing cardiac surgery, and is higher in patients at risk for stroke. A more subtle constellation of neurocognitive deficits attributed to cardiopulmonary bypass is known as postperfusion syndrome, sometimes called "pumphead". The symptoms of postperfusion syndrome were initially felt to be permanent, but were shown to be transient with no permanent neurological impairment.

To assess the performance of surgical units and individual surgeons, a popular risk model has been created called the EuroSCORE. This takes a number of health factors from a patient and using precalculated logistic regression coefficients attempts to give a percentage chance of survival to discharge. Within the UK this EuroSCORE was used to give a breakdown of all the centres for cardiothoracic surgery and to give some indication of whether the units and their individual surgeons performed within an acceptable range. The results are available on the CQC website. The precise methodology used has however not been published to date nor has the raw data on which the results are based.

Infection represents the primary non-cardiac complication from cardiothoracic surgery. Infections include mediastinitis, infectious myo- or pericarditis, endocarditis, cardiac device infection, pneumonia, empyema, and bloodstream infections. Clostridioides difficile colitis can develop when prophylactic or post-operative antibiotics are used.

Post-operative patients of cardiothoracic surgery are at risk of nausea, vomiting, dysphagia, and aspiration pneumonia.

== Thoracic surgery ==
A pleurectomy is a surgical procedure in which part of the pleura is removed. It is sometimes used in the treatment of pneumothorax and mesothelioma. In case of pneumothorax, only the apical and the diaphragmatic portions of the parietal pleura are removed.

=== Lung volume reduction surgery ===
Lung volume reduction surgery, or LVRS, can improve the quality of life for certain patients with COPD of emphysematous type, when other treatment options are not enough. Parts of the lung that are particularly damaged by emphysema are removed, allowing the remaining, relatively good lung to expand and work more efficiently. The beneficial effects are correlated with the achieved reduction in residual volume. Conventional LVRS involves resection of the most severely affected areas of emphysematous, non-bullous lung (aim is for 20–30%). This is a surgical option involving a mini-thoracotomy for patients in end stage COPD due to underlying emphysema, and can improve lung elastic recoil as well as diaphragmatic function.

The National Emphysema Treatment Trial (NETT) was a large multicentre study (N = 1218) comparing LVRS with non-surgical treatment. Results suggested that there was no overall survival advantage in the LVRS group, except for mainly upper-lobe emphysema + poor exercise capacity, and significant improvements were seen in exercise capacity in the LVRS group. Later studies have shown a wider scope of treatment with better outcomes.

Possible complications of LVRS include prolonged air leak (mean duration post surgery until all chest tubes removed is 10.9 ± 8.0 days.

In people who have a predominantly upper lobe emphysema, lung volume reduction surgery could result in better health status and lung function, though it also increases the risk of early mortality and adverse events.

LVRS is used widely in Europe, though its application in the United States is mostly experimental.

A less invasive treatment is available as a bronchoscopic lung volume reduction procedure.

=== Lung cancer surgery ===
Not all lung cancers are suitable for surgery. The stage, location and cell type are important limiting factors. In addition, people who are very ill with a poor performance status or who have inadequate pulmonary reserve would be unlikely to survive. Even with careful selection, the overall operative death rate is about 4.4%.

In non-small cell lung cancer staging, stages IA, IB, IIA, and IIB are suitable for surgical resection.

Pulmonary reserve is measured by spirometry. If there is no evidence of undue shortness of breath or diffuse parenchymal lung disease, and the FEV_{1} exceeds 2 litres or 80% of predicted, the person is fit for pneumonectomy. If the FEV_{1} exceeds 1.5 litres, the patient is fit for lobectomy.

There is weak evidence to indicate that participation in exercise programs before lung cancer surgery may reduce the risk of complications after surgery.

Since the early 21st century, video-assisted and robot-assisted minimally invasive techniques, including video-assisted thoracic surgery (VATS) and robot-assisted thoracic surgery (RATS), have become increasingly established. These approaches allow lung resections through smaller incisions and may reduce surgical trauma compared with open surgery.

Laser-assisted techniques can be used in both open thoracic procedures and VATS, including for the resection of selected pulmonary lesions and metastases while preserving surrounding lung parenchyma. Parenchyma-sparing laser resection may be particularly useful in patients with multiple, bilateral, or deeply located metastases, as it can allow multiple lesions to be resected while limiting the loss of healthy lung tissue and, in selected cases, avoiding more extensive anatomical lung resections. Although patients undergoing laser-assisted resection often have more metastases and more frequently bilateral disease, systematic reviews have reported similar overall survival to patients undergoing conventional resection techniques. By preserving lung parenchyma, laser-assisted resection may facilitate repeat pulmonary metastasectomy in selected patients with recurrent disease.

==== Complications ====
A prolonged air leak (PAL) can occur in 8–25% of people following lung cancer surgery. This complication delays chest tube removal and is associated with an increased length of hospital stay following a lung resection (lung cancer surgery). The use of surgical sealants may reduce the incidence of prolonged air leaks, however, this intervention alone has not been shown to results in a decreased length of hospital stay following lung cancer surgery.

There is no strong evidence to support using non-invasive positive pressure ventilation following lung cancer surgery to reduce pulmonary complications.

==== Types ====
- Lobectomy (removal of a lobe of the lung)
- Sublobar resection (removal of part of lobe of the lung)
- Segmentectomy (removal of an anatomic division of a particular lobe of the lung)
- Pneumonectomy (removal of an entire lung)
- Wedge resection
- Sleeve/bronchoplastic resection (removal of an associated tubular section of the associated main bronchial passage during lobectomy with subsequent reconstruction of the bronchial passage)
- Video-assisted thoracoscopic surgery (VATS) lobectomy (minimally invasive approach to lobectomy that may allow for diminished pain, quicker return to full activity, and diminished hospital costs)
- Esophagectomy (removal of the esophagus)
- Robotic-assisted thoracic surgery (RATS)
- Laser-assisted resection (parenchyma-sparing resection of selected pulmonary lesions and metastases)

== See also ==
- Annals of Thoracic Surgery
- European Journal of Cardio-Thoracic Surgery
- Journal of Thoracic and Cardiovascular Surgery
