= Lillehei =

Lillehei is a surname. Notable people with the surname include:

- C. Walton Lillehei (1918–1999), American surgeon
- Richard C. Lillehei (1927–1981), American surgeon
