= Daniel Hale Williams =

American cardiologist (1856–1931)

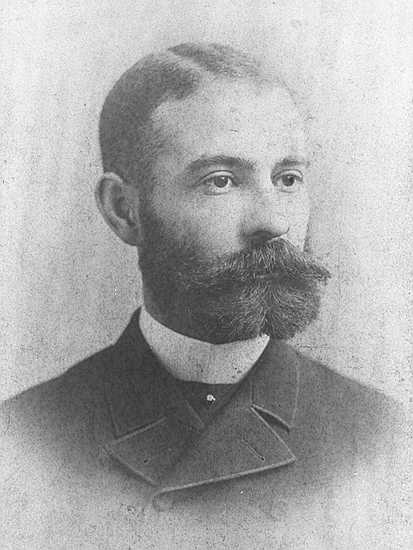
- Williams c. 1900
- Born: January 18, 1856; Hollidaysburg, Pennsylvania, US
- Died: August 4, 1931 (aged 75); Idlewild, Michigan, US
- Education: Chicago Medical College
- Known for: Being the first to ever perform a successful open-heart surgery
- Scientific career
- Fields: Cardiology
- Workplaces: Provident Hospital; Meharry Medical College; Freedman's Hospital; St. Lukes Hospital; Cook County Hospital

Daniel Hale Williams (January 18, 1856 (Note: Although a half dozen biographical dictionaries place Daniel Hale Williams's birth date in 1858, 1856 is the date given in the U.S. Census records of Hollidaysburg, Pennsylvania, for 1860 and of Janesville, Wisconsin, for 1880; these agree on 1856, and the former was given by his parents. Also, when Dan Williams registered officially with the Illinois State Board of Health as a physician, on April 18, 1883, he gave his age as twenty-eight. This too points to 1856, making him at his registration twenty-seven years and three months old, or in his twenty-eighth year. Buckler, Helen. Daniel Hale Williams: Negro Surgeon, Pitman Publishing Company, 1954, pp. 287–288.) – August 4, 1931) was a Black American surgeon and hospital founder. He founded Provident Hospital in 1891, which was the first non-segregated hospital in the United States. He is known for being the first to successfully perform a cardiac surgery—specifically, a procedure on the pericardium, the double-layered, fluid-filled sac that encloses the heart and the roots of the great vessels. The pericardium anchors the heart, protects it from infection and trauma, and reduces friction during its constant beating by providing lubrication.

In 1913, Williams was elected as the only African-American charter member of the American College of Surgeons.

== Biography ==
=== Early life and education ===
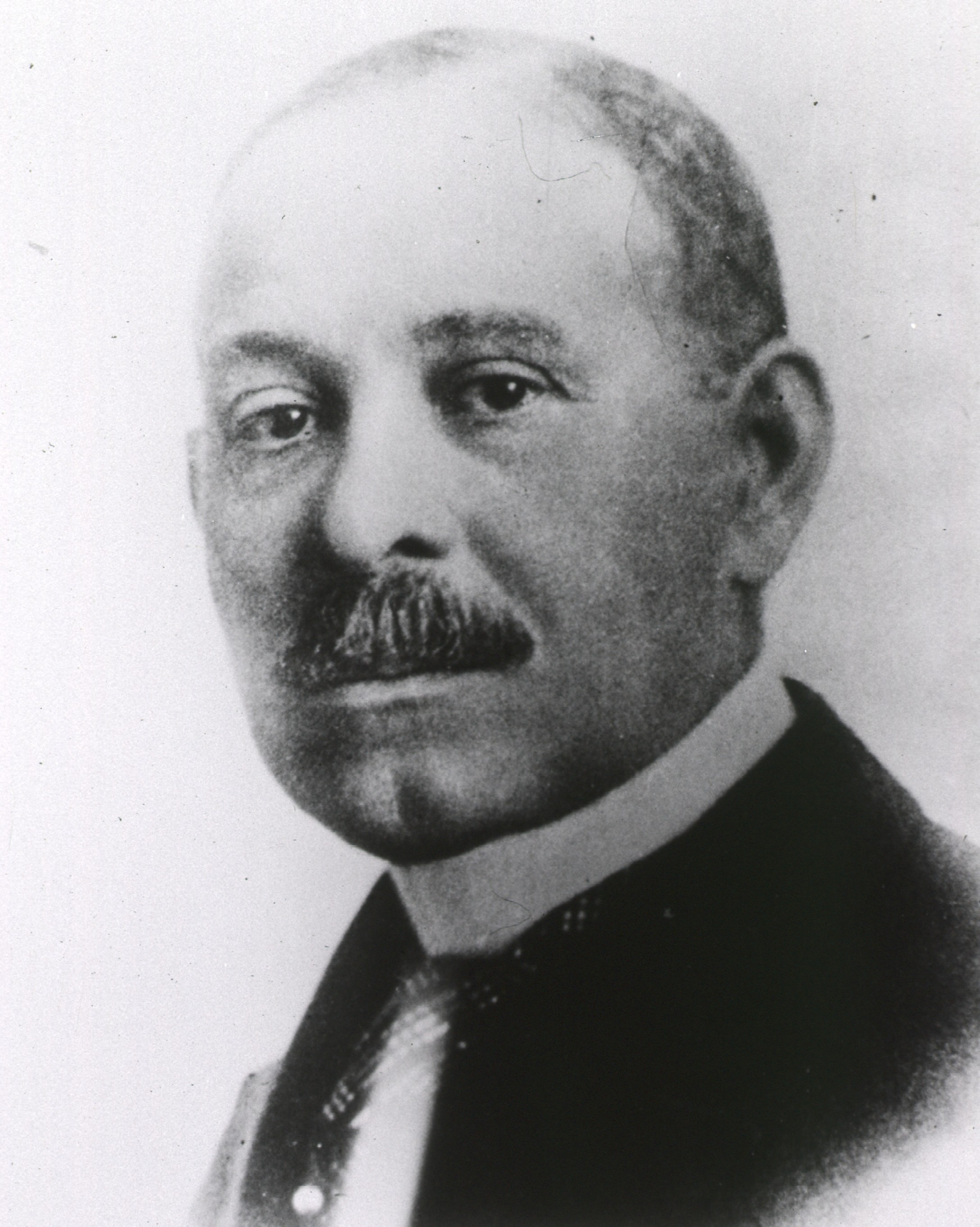
Later photo of Williams

Williams was born on January 18, 1856, and raised in the city of Hollidaysburg, Pennsylvania. His father, Daniel Williams Jr., was the son of a Scots-Irish woman and a black barber. His mother, Sarah Price, was a mixed race American. His Williams family great grandfather was listed in the 1790 U. S. census for Philadelphia City, as 'other free,' a designation that included black Americans. (Note: Buckler identified Williams' Williams family great grandfather as Joseph Williams. Joseph Williams lived on Cresson Alley in Philadelphia. The alley no longer exists as the National Constitution Center (NCC) was built on the site where the alley was located. The NCC placed two plaques on its walls to present the names of the 1790 Cresson Alley residents, and so Joseph Williams' name is displayed on the NCC.)

The fifth born child, Williams lived with his parents, a brother and five sisters. His family eventually moved to Annapolis, Maryland. Shortly after when Williams was nine, his father died of tuberculosis. Williams' mother realized she could not manage the entire family and sent some of the children to live with relatives. Williams was apprenticed to a shoemaker in Baltimore but ran away to join his mother, who had moved to Rockford, Illinois. He later moved to Edgerton, Wisconsin, where he joined his sister and opened his own barber shop. After moving to nearby Janesville, Wisconsin, Williams became fascinated by the work of a local physician and decided to follow his path.

He began working as an apprentice to Henry W. Palmer, studying with him for two years. In 1880, Williams entered Chicago Medical College, now known as Northwestern University Medical School. His education was funded by Mary Jane Richardson Jones, a prominent activist and leader of Chicago's black community. He earned a Doctor of Medicine from Northwestern University Medical School in 1883.

=== Career ===
After graduation, he opened a private medical practice in Chicago, Illinois.

From 1885 to 1888, Williams worked as a demonstrator in anatomy at Northwestern. He later was appointed an instructor at Northwestern's free clinic, the South Side Dispensary.

In 1887, he was appointed to the Illinois State Board of Health. That same year, he became an attending physician at the Protestant Orphan Asylum, an institution that was established to respond to the cholera epidemic.

==== Provident Hospital ====
In 1891, Williams founded the Provident Hospital, which also provided a training residency for doctors and training school for nurses in Chicago. This was established mostly for the benefit of African-American residents, to increase their accessibility to health care, but its staff and patients were integrated from the start.

In 1892, he endorsed the application of Emma Ann Reynolds, who was a graduate of the nurses training school at Provident, to Northwestern University Woman’s Medical School. In 1895, Reynolds became the first black woman to receive a Doctor of Medicine from Northwestern.

==== Heart surgery ====
In 1893, Williams became the first African American on record to have successfully performed pericardium surgery to repair a wound. On September 6, 1891, Henry Dalton had been the first white American to successfully perform pericardium surgery to repair a wound. Earlier successful surgeries to drain the pericardium, by performing a pericardiostomy were done by Francisco Romero in 1801 and Dominique Jean Larrey in 1810.

On July 10, 1893, Williams repaired the torn pericardium of a knife wound patient, James Cornish. Cornish, who was stabbed directly through the left fifth costal cartilage, had been admitted the previous night. Williams decided to operate the next morning in response to continued bleeding, cough and "pronounced" symptoms of shock. He performed this surgery, without the benefit of penicillin or blood transfusion, at Provident Hospital, Chicago. It was not reported until 1897. He undertook a second procedure to drain fluid. About fifty days after the initial procedure, Cornish left the hospital.

==== Public and teaching posts ====
In 1893, during the administration of President Grover Cleveland, Williams was appointed surgeon-in-chief of Freedman's Hospital in Washington, D.C., a post he held until 1898. That year he married Alice Johnson, who was born in the city and graduated from Howard University, and moved back to Chicago. In addition to organizing Provident Hospital, Williams also established a training school for African-American nurses at the facility. In 1897, he was appointed to the Illinois Department of Public Health, where he worked to raise medical and hospital standards.

Williams was a Professor of Clinical Surgery at Meharry Medical College in Nashville, Tennessee, and was an attending surgeon at Cook County Hospital in Chicago. He worked to create more hospitals that admitted African Americans. In 1895 he co-founded the National Medical Association for African-American doctors, and in 1913 he became a charter member and the only African-American doctor in the American College of Surgeons.

=== Death ===
His wife, Alice Johnson, died in 1924. Williams passed away in relative obscurity, of a stroke in Idlewild, Michigan on August 4, 1931. His funeral took place at St Anselm Catholic Church in Chicago, and there is debate about how well attended the service was. Dr Daniel Hale Williams was 75 years old.

== Personal life ==
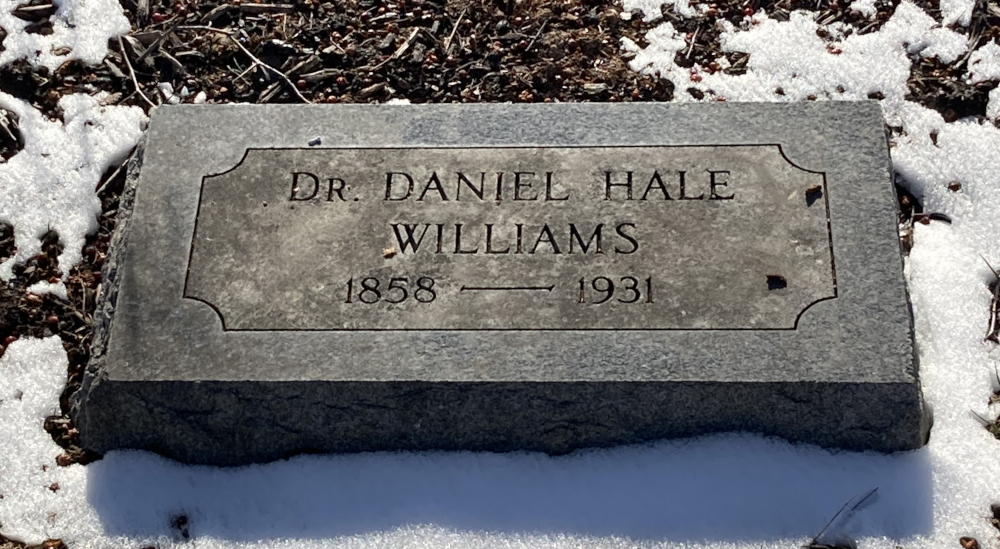
Williams' grave at Graceland Cemetery

Williams was married in 1898 to Alice Johnson, natural daughter of the Jewish-American sculptor Moses Jacob Ezekiel and a biracial maid. His retirement home was in Idlewild, Michigan, a black community.

Williams was baptized a Catholic by Fr Joseph Eckert, SVD on his deathbed. He left $2,500 (worth $44,686 in 2021) in his will to St. Elizabeth's Church in Chicago. Williams was buried at Graceland Cemetery in Chicago's Uptown neighborhood.

== Legacy and impact ==
In the 1890s several attempts were made to improve cardiac surgery. On September 6, 1891, the first successful pericardial sac repair operation in the United States of America was performed by Henry C. Dalton of Saint Louis, Missouri. The first successful surgery on the heart itself was performed by Norwegian surgeon Axel Cappelen on September 4, 1895, at Rikshospitalet in Kristiania, now Oslo. The first successful surgery of the heart, performed without any complications, was by Ludwig Rehn of Frankfurt, Germany, who repaired a stab wound to the right ventricle on September 7, 1896. Despite these improvements, heart-related surgery was not widely accepted in the field of medical science until during World War II. Surgeons were forced to improve their methods of surgery in order to repair severe war wounds. Although they did not receive early recognition for their pioneering work, Dalton and Williams were later recognised for their roles in cardiac surgery.

== Honors ==
Williams received honorary degrees from Howard and Wilberforce Universities, was named a charter member of the American College of Surgeons, and was a member of the Chicago Surgical Society.

- A Pennsylvania State Historical Marker was placed at U.S. Route 22 eastbound (Blair St., 300 block), Hollidaysburg, Pennsylvania, to commemorate his accomplishments and mark his boyhood home.
- His home in Chicago is now known as the Daniel Hale Williams House and was added to the National Register of Historic Places in 1975.
- His retirement home in Idlewild was given a historical marker by the state of Michigan in 2008.
- Several schools are named in his honor, including the Daniel Hale Williams Preparatory School of Medicine in Chicago; Daniel Hale Williams Elementary in Gary, Indiana; P.S. 307 Daniel Hale Williams in Brooklyn; and M.S. 180 Dr. Daniel Hale Williams in the Bronx.
- Williams Park in Chicago is also named in his honor.

== Representation in other media ==
- The Stevie Wonder song "Black Man" honors the achievements of Williams, among others.
- Tim Reid plays Williams in the TV series Sister, Sister season 5 episode 18 "I Have a Dream" (February 25, 1998).
- In 2002, scholar Molefi Kete Asante listed Daniel Hale Williams on his list of 100 Greatest African Americans.
- His life (along with Ulysses Grant Dailey) is retold in the 1948 radio drama "The Heart of George Cotton", presented on Destination Freedom
- The Kendrick Lamar song "Prayer" references Dr. Daniel Hale Williams' historic achievement as the first person to successfully perform open-heart surgery.

== See also ==
- The Knick
- Vivien Thomas

== Bibliography ==
- Bigelow, Barbara Carlisle, Contemporary Black biography: profiles from the international Black community, Gale Research Inc., 1992, ISBN 0810385546
