= Russell Brock, Baron Brock =

British surgeon (1903–80)

The Right Honourable The Lord Brock Kt FRCS FRCP
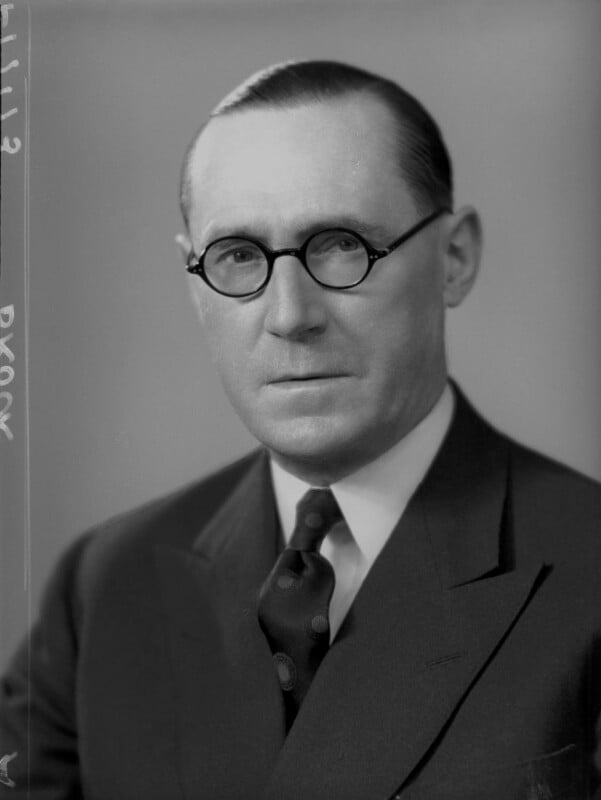
- Brock in 1954
- Born: October 24, 1903; London, England
- Died: September 3, 1980 (aged 76); London, England
- Education: Guy's Hospital Medical School
- Medical career
- Profession: Surgeon
- Sub-specialties: Thoracic surgery
- Awards: Jacksonian Prize (1935); Cameron Prize for Therapeutics of the University of Edinburgh (1954); Lister Medal (1966)

Russell Claude Brock, Baron Brock (24 October 1903 – 3 September 1980) was a British chest and heart surgeon and one of the pioneers of modern open-heart surgery. His achievements were recognised by a knighthood in 1954, a life peerage in 1965, and a host of other awards.

== Biography ==
Russell Brock was born in London, 1903, the son of Herbert Brock, a master photographer, and his wife, Elvina (née Carman). He was the second of six sons and fourth of eight children. He was educated at Haselrigge Road School, Clapham, and then at Christ's Hospital, Horsham, where he later became an Almoner (governor). He entered Guy's Hospital Medical School in 1921 at age 17 with an arts scholarship. He qualified LRCP (Lond.) and MRCS (Eng.) 1926, and graduated MB, BS (Lond.) with honours and distinction in medicine, surgery, and anatomy in 1927. He was appointed demonstrator in anatomy and in pathology at Guy's and passed the final FRCS (Eng.) in 1929.

Brock was elected to a Rockefeller travelling fellowship and worked in the surgical department of Evarts Graham at St. Louis, Missouri, from 1929 to 1930. There he developed a lifelong interest in thoracic surgery. He returned to Guy's as surgical registrar and tutor in 1932 and was appointed research fellow of the Association of Surgeons of Great Britain and Ireland. He won the Jacksonian prize of the Royal College of Surgeons of England in 1935 and was elected a Hunterian professor in 1938. Appointments included consultant thoracic surgeon to the London County Council, from 1935 to 1946; surgeon to the Ministry of Pensions at Roehampton Hospital, from 1936 to 1945; surgeon to Guy's and the Brompton hospitals from 1936 to 1968. During World War Two, he was also thoracic surgeon and regional adviser in thoracic surgery to the Emergency Medical Service in the Guy's region. Based on this experience, in 1946 he published a book on bronchial anatomy which became a classic.

The end of the war provided opportunities for surgeons with war experience to turn their attention to unsolved civilian problems. In 1947, Thomas Holmes Sellors (1902–1987) of the Middlesex Hospital operated on a Fallot's Tetralogy patient with pulmonary stenosis and successfully divided the stenosed pulmonary valve. In 1948, Brock, probably unaware of Sellor's work, used a specially designed dilator in three cases of pulmonary stenosis. Later in 1948 he designed a punch to resect the infundibular muscle stenosis which is often associated with Fallot's Tetralogy.

Also in 1948, he was one of four surgeons who carried out successful operations for mitral stenosis resulting from rheumatic fever. Horace Smithy (1914–1948) of Charlotte, revived an operation due to Dr Elliott Cutler of the Peter Bent Brigham Hospital using a punch to remove a portion of the mitral valve. Charles Bailey (1910–1993) at the Hahnemann Hospital, Philadelphia, Dwight Harken in Boston and Russell Brock at Guy's all adopted the finger fracture technique first used by Henry Souttar in 1925. All these men started work independently of each other, within a few months. This latter technique was widely adopted, although there were modifications. Souttar had pioneered the method in one patient and the patient did well, but his physician colleagues at that time decided it was not justified, and he could not continue. Together these men created an entirely new therapeutic tradition. Many thousands of these "blind" operations were performed until the introduction of heart bypass made direct surgery on valves possible.

Inspired by exchange professorships between himself and Dr Alfred Blalock of Johns Hopkins Hospital, Baltimore, Brock also introduced new developments, notably hypothermia and the heart-lung machine, as they emerged, enabling operations to be performed directly.

He was very much an individualist, found his own solutions to problems and was not always good at accepting the solutions of others. On the other hand, John Kirklin said that when he (Kirklin) had just performed his first operation at the Mayo Clinic using the Mayo-Gibbon oxygenator, and was about to do his second, Brock phoned, asking to come and watch. Knowing that Brock was supposed to be a difficult man with a big reputation, Kirklin offered him the chance to scrub up and stand in the theatre, but he said, "No, no, no. I don't want to bother you". He sat and watched inconspicuously in the gallery.

He was awarded the 1966 Lister Medal for his contributions to surgical science. The corresponding Lister Oration, given at the Royal College of Surgeons of England, was delivered on 4 April 1967, and was titled 'Surgery and Lister'.

Brock died in Guy's Hospital on 3 September 1980.

== Services, awards and honours ==
Assistant editor and later editor of Guy's Hospital Reports 1939–1960.

Contributed important papers on cardiac and thoracic surgery to medical and surgical journals and textbooks.

Served on the Council of the Royal College of Surgeons of England, 1949–1967, and as vice-president 1956-8 and President 1963–6, and director of department of surgical sciences established during his presidency.

Delivered the Bradshaw Lecture at the Royal College of Surgeons in 1957 and their Hunterian oration in 1961.

Knighted 6 July 1954

Life peerage Created Baron Brock of Wimbledon in the London Borough of Merton on 5 July 1965.

President Thoracic Society of Great Britain and Ireland in 1952; Society of Cardiovascular and Thoracic Surgeons of Great Britain and Ireland in 1958; Medical Society of London in 1958.

Elected fellow: Thoracic Society of Great Britain and Ireland; Royal College of Physicians of London in 1965

Elected Honorary fellow: American College of Surgeons, 1949; the Brazilian College, 1952; the Royal Australasian College of Surgeons, 1958; the Royal College of Surgeons in Ireland, 1965; the Royal College of Physicians and Surgeons of Canada; and the Royal College of Surgeons of Edinburgh, 1966.

Awards: Julius Mickle prize of London University (1952), Fothergillian Gold Medal of the Medical Society of London (1953), Cameron Prize for Therapeutics of the University of Edinburgh (1954), Gold Medal of Society of Apothecaries (1955), Gold Medal of West London Medical and Chirurgical Society (1955), International Gairdner award, 1960–1, Lister medallist and orator, 1967.

Honorary degrees from universities: University of Hamburg (1962), University of Leeds (1965), University of Cambridge (1968), University of Guelph, and LMU Munich (1972).

== Other interests ==
Outside his professional work he had considerable knowledge of old furniture and prints, and history, especially local and medical history. Less well known was his dedication to the complementary interests of private medicine and the NHS, for he served on the governing body of Private Patients Plan and was chairman (1967–77) before becoming its president. He was responsible for the discovery and restoration, on the Guy's site, of an eighteenth-century operating theatre which was formerly part of the old St. Thomas's Hospital

In 1927, he married Germaine Louise Ladavèze (died 1978). They had three daughters. In 1979, he married Chrissie Palmer Jones.

== Arms ==
Coat of arms of Russell Brock, Baron Brock

Crest
A brock passant Or resting the dexter forepaw on a human heart.
Escutcheon
Per chevron Sable and Argent in chief two brocks passant Or and in base a human heart ensigned with a mitre sans lappets Azure.
Supporters
Dexter a Siberian tiger statant guardant Proper, sinister a lion guardant Gules holding in the dexter paw a brock Proper.

== Publications ==
- The Anatomy of the Bronchial Tree, with special reference to the surgery of lung abscess (Oxford University Press: London, 1946, Second edition 1954);
- The Life and Work of Astley Cooper (E. & S. Livingstone: Edinburgh & London, 1952);
- Lung Abscess (Blackwell Scientific Publications: Oxford, 1952);
- The Anatomy of Congenital Pulmonary Stenosis (Cassell & Co.: London, 1957);
- John Keats and Joseph Severn, the tragedy of the last illness, 1973.

== See also ==
Wimbledon Manor House
