= Henry Dalton =

Henry C. Dalton
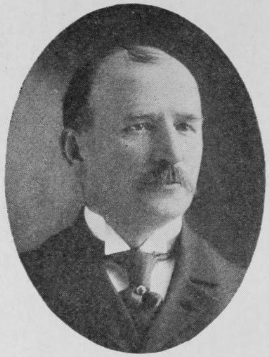
- Born: May 7, 1847; Aberdeen, Mississippi
- Died: November 3, 1911 (aged 64); Saint Louis, Missouri
- Occupation: Surgeon
- Spouse: Alice Cravens (m. 1875)
- Children: 3

Henry Clay Dalton (May 7, 1847 – November 3, 1911) was superintendent of the St. Louis City Hospital, Missouri, United States, from 1886 to 1892, and later a professor of abdominal and clinical surgery at Marion Sims College of Medicine (now part of the St. Louis University School of Medicine). He is noted for being the first American to perform the suturing of the pericardium on record. Spanish surgeon Francisco Romero was documented with performing two successful surgeries in 1801 and French surgeon Dominique Jean Larrey was documented as successfully performing surgery on a woman's pericardium in 1810.

== Biography ==
Henry Dalton was born in Aberdeen, Mississippi on May 7, 1847.

He married Alice Cravens on March 17, 1875, and they had three children.

He died at Deaconess Hospital in St. Louis on November 3, 1911, after an operation for appendicitis. Henry Dalton was just 64 years old.

== Suturing of the pericardium ==
The operation occurred on September 6, 1891 at the City Hospital, on a twenty-two-year-old man who had been stabbed in the chest. Upon arrival of the patient, Dalton cleaned the wound and applied a dressing of antiseptic gauze. After several hours, the patient's condition worsened: the left side of his chest became dull to percussion; his temperature and pulse rate rose; his breathing became shallow; and he complained of considerable pain. He was taken to the surgical amphitheatre, where Dalton made an incision over the fourth rib and removed about 6 inches (15 cm) of it. After tying the severed intercostal artery to control bleeding and removing the blood from the pleural cavity, Dalton observed a transverse wound of the pericardium about 2 inches (5 cm) in length. With a sharply curved needle and catgut, he closed the wound by continuous suture, overcoming great difficulty caused by the heart pulsations. The pleural cavity was then irrigated and the chest incision closed without drainage. The patient made "an uninterrupted, rapid recovery." The published report of the operation appeared in the state medical association's journal and another local periodical in 1894, and in the Annals of Surgery the following year.

== Legacy ==
On July 10, 1893 African American surgeon Daniel Hale Williams became the first on record to replicate Dalton's success, repairing the torn pericardium of knife wound patient James Cornish. In the mid-1890s, attempts were made to further improve cardiac surgery. The first successful surgery on the heart itself was performed by Norwegian surgeon Axel Cappelen on 4 September 1895 at Rikshospitalet in Kristiania, now Oslo. The first successful surgery of the heart, performed without any complications, was by Dr. Ludwig Rehn of Frankfurt, Germany, who repaired a stab wound to the right ventricle on September 7, 1896.

Despite these new accomplishments, Dalton and other early cardiac surgeon received little recognition for the successful surgeries they performed and surgeons still thought they should not perform surgery on the heart. Heart surgery would not be widely accepted among surgeons until World War II broke out and forced battlefield surgeons to improve their methods of surgery in order to repair severe war wounds. Despite the earlier lack of recognition for his accomplishments, Dalton later received good recognition for his role in revolutionizing cardiac surgery.
