= Vinay Badhwar =

Canadian-American surgeon

Vinay Badhwar is a Canadian and American cardiothoracic and robotic surgeon at West Virginia University (WVU). He is a professor and chairman of the Department of Cardiovascular and Thoracic Surgery and the executive chair of the WVU Heart and Vascular Institute. Among other firsts, he developed the transaxillary robotic aortic valve replacement (RAVR) in 2020. Badhwar currently serves as the president of the Society of Thoracic Surgeons.

== Education ==
Badhwar obtained his medical degree in 1993 from the University of Ottawa. He completed his surgical residency in 1998 at McGill University in Montreal then received an MSc. from its Surgical Scientist Program, in February 1999. He completed his Cardiothoracic Fellowship at the University of Ottawa Heart Institute in 2000, followed by further fellowships in heart failure, transplantation, and valve reconstruction at the University of Michigan.

== Career ==
Badhwar began practicing in Florida in 2002, specializing in mitral valve repair, surgical treatments for atrial fibrillation and heart failure, and minimally invasive cardiac surgery. He served as chief of cardiovascular surgery at the Central Florida Cardiac & Vascular Institute of Osceola Regional Medical Center (later HCA Florida Osceola Hospital). He then joined the University of Pittsburgh Medical School as chief of cardiac surgery at UPMC Presbyterian and director of cardiac surgery for the University of Pittsburgh Medical Center Heart and Vascular Institute.

In 2016, Badhwar became the inaugural executive chair of the new West Virginia University (WVU) Heart and Vascular Institute. He is the Gordon F. Murray Professor and chairman of the Department of Cardiothoracic Surgery in the WVU School of Medicine, and holds several novel valve therapy patents. On November 2, 2019, Badhwar performed the first heart transplant in West Virginia. He and his team also developed the right lateral transaxillary approach to robotic RAVR, with their first case on January 10, 2020.

On October 31, 2024, Badhwar led the surgical team that successfully performed the world’s first combined robotic AVR and CABG through a small, singular right transaxillary incision, with a detailed account subsequently published in The Annals of Thoracic Surgery. On May 27, 2025, Badhwar performed the first robotic transcatheter aortic valve replacement (TAVR) explant and RAVR. In early 2024, he was elected first vice president of The Society of Thoracic Surgeons (STS), and on January 31, 2025, he was elected its president.

His research is published in scholarly journals and books, and he is a senior member of the editorial board of The Journal of Thoracic and Cardiovascular Surgery and of The Annals of Thoracic Surgery.
