= Johan Christian Severin Cappelen =

Norwegian physician

Johan Christian Severin Cappelen (25 January 1855 – 12 December 1935) was a Norwegian physician.

He was born in Selje Municipality as a son of district physician Johan Nicolay Cappelen (1818–1890) and Elisabeth Brunchorst Ravn (1825–1906). His brother Axel Hermansen Cappelen was also a physician. In 1881, he married Katharina Margrethe Steen (1859—1915). They had one daughter, Astrid, and two sons, Johan and Christian, as well as several children who did not survive infancy.

He attended Bergen Cathedral School and finished his secondary education in 1873 and graduated from the Royal Frederick University with the cand.med. degree in 1880. From 1881 to 1882, he worked in Bergen and Bjørnør Municipality. In 1882, he moved to Namsos, serving as municipal physician for Overhalden Municipality, and in 1884 he settled in Levanger Municipality. He was the municipal physician of the town of Levanger, Skogn Municipality, and Levanger landsogn, and from 1892 to 1911 he was a chief physician at Nordre Trondhjem County Hospital in the city. He was responsible for moving the hospital from peripheral Eidesøra to downtown Levanger. The building complex Cappelen-gården in Sjøgata 16 was erected by Cappelen in 1898, following a city fire the previous year.

He was an elected local politician in Levanger and an elector in the 1894 Norwegian parliamentary election. He was also a board member of the savings bank Levanger og Skogns Sparebank as well as the county jail. In 1911, he moved to Trondhjem, where he worked as a surgeon and gynecologist. He died in December 1935.

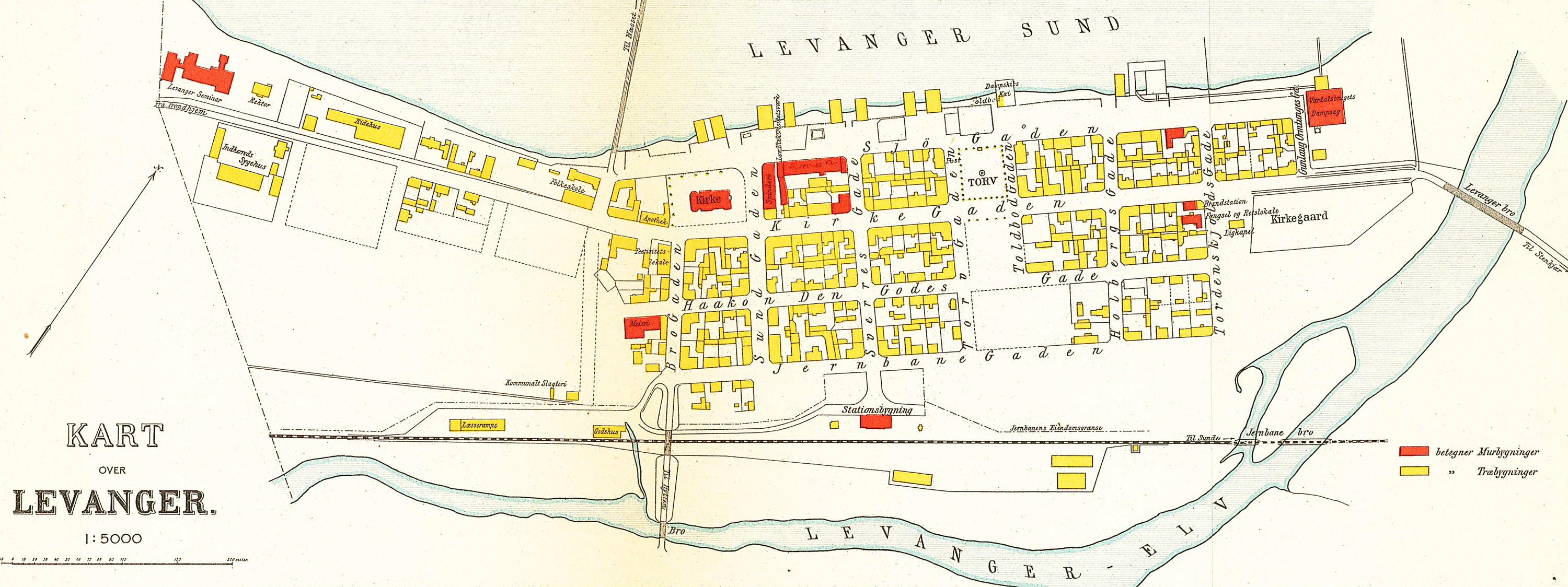
Levanger map from 1909. The hospital is the leftmost yellow building. Sjøgata runs by the port to the north.
