= Off-pump coronary artery bypass =

Off-pump coronary artery bypass (OPCAB)
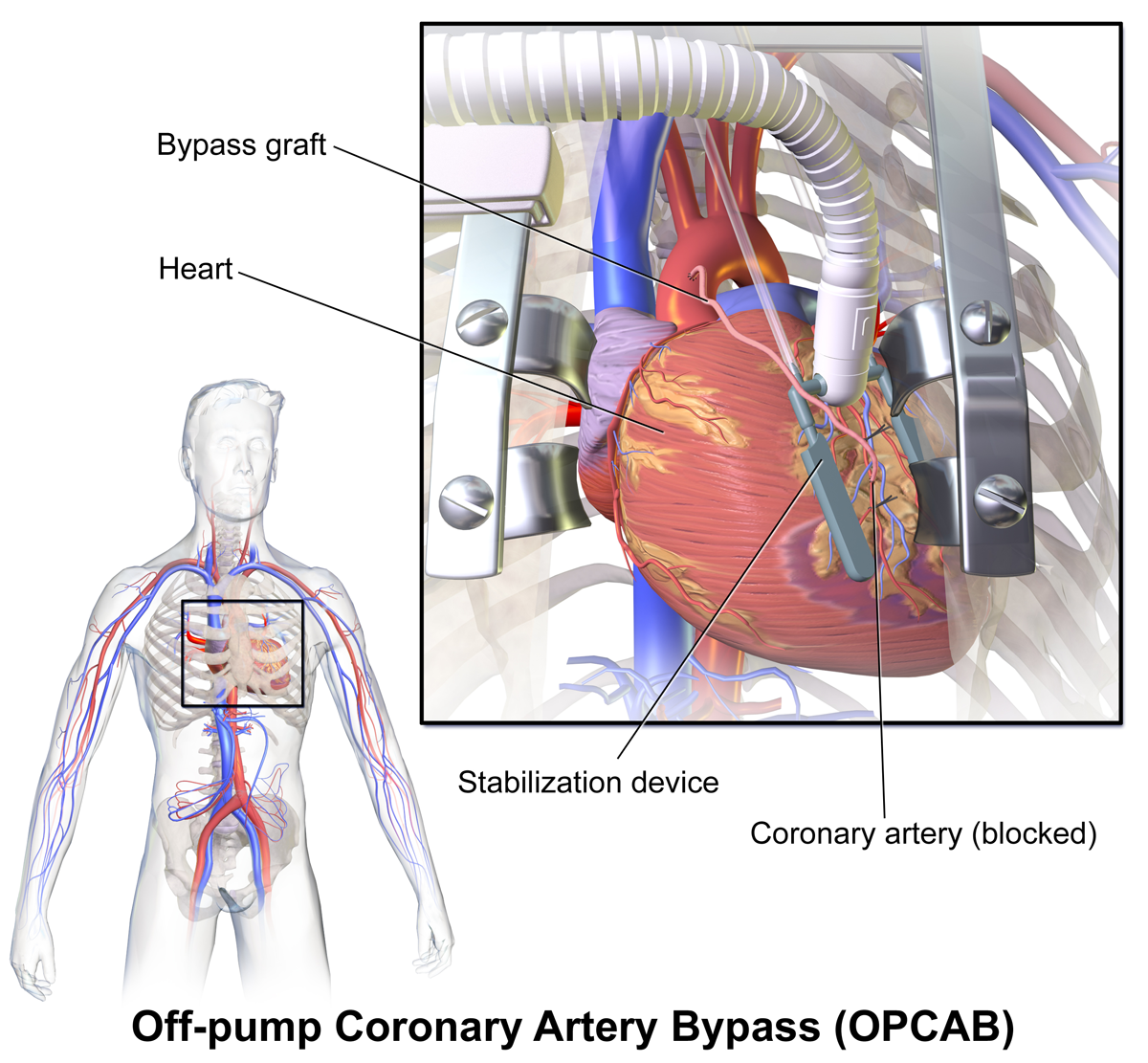
- OPCAB
- Specialty: Cardiothoracic surgery
- MeSH: D047549

Off-pump coronary artery bypass (OPCAB), or beating-heart surgery, is a form of coronary artery bypass graft (CABG) surgery performed without cardiopulmonary bypass (heart-lung machine) as a treatment for coronary heart disease. It was primarily developed in the early 1990s by Dr. Amano Atsushi. Historically, during bypass surgeries, the heart is stopped and a heart-lung machine takes over the work of the heart and lungs. When a cardiac surgeon chooses to perform the CABG procedure off-pump (OPCAB) the heart is still beating while the graft attachments are made to bypass a blockage.

Off-pump coronary artery bypass was developed partly to avoid the complications of cardiopulmonary bypass during cardiac surgery. It had been believed that cardiopulmonary bypass causes a post-operative cognitive decline known as a postperfusion syndrome (informally called "pumphead"), but research has shown no long-term difference between on and off pump coronary artery bypass in patients of lower risk. This is probably because the pump is not the main cause of brain damage but is due to the formation of a clot or embolus.

Sometimes, the fatty type materials that collects to form a blockage or line on the walls of an artery may break loose during CABG procedure manipulation. This debris can result in clots, or emboli, that may interrupt the flow of blood to the brain, causing neurological damage or even stroke. Data analysis from beating-heart surgery patients shows a significant reduction in the release of this debris with correspondingly lower stroke rates.

The fatty emboli which cause brain damage are generated when the large artery from the heart (aorta) is manipulated and although these are reduced in most off-pump coronary bypass surgeries they are not eliminated because the aorta is still used as a site to attach some of the grafts. A growing number of OPCAB surgeons, however, are avoiding the aorta completely, known as "anaortic" or no-touch coronary bypass surgery, by taking all their grafts from sites other than the aorta (e.g. the internal mammary arteries.). This results in a very low risk of stroke, actually less than occurs during percutaneous coronary intervention.

In addition to off-pump surgery being associated with the clinical benefits of a reduced risk of stroke or memory problems, patients also typically have a faster recovery and shorter hospital stay, fewer blood transfusions, and fewer unwanted inflammatory/immune response issues.

Minimally invasive direct coronary artery bypass surgery (MIDCAB) is a form of OPCAB that involves an incision rather than cutting into the sternum. An advanced form of this is totally endoscopic coronary artery bypass surgery (TECAB) that uses robotic surgery.

Off-pump surgery can be more technically challenging. The technique has a steep learning curve, but with adequate training and experience, the quality of the anastomoses has been shown to be similar to on-pump results in surgeons with comparable experience.

On January 24, 2009, Dr. Ramakanta Panda performed a successful off-pump coronary artery bypass operation on Dr. Manmohan Singh, the then Prime Minister of India. It was the second bypass surgery for Dr. Singh, who had a triple bypass surgery in 1990 and an angioplasty with stenting in 2004.

On February 18, 2012, Amano Atsushi performed a successful off-pump coronary artery bypass operation on Emperor Akihito.
