= Vasoplegic syndrome =

Type of neurocognitive impairment

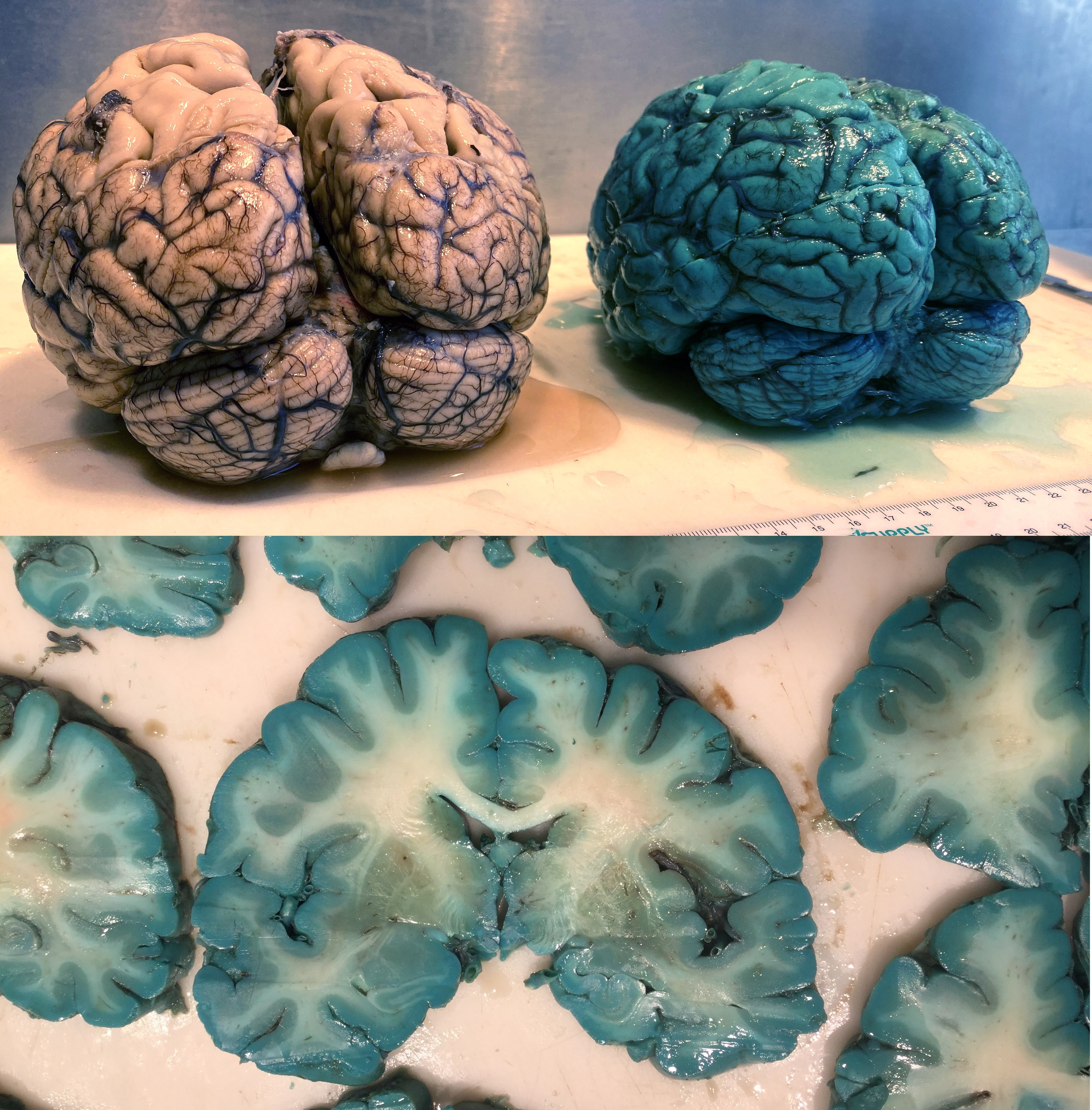
Gross pathology of a normal brain and a brain of a patient treated with methylene blue before death in a case of vasoplegic syndrome.

Vasoplegic syndrome or vasoplegia syndrome (VPS) is a postperfusion syndrome characterized by low systemic vascular resistance and a high cardiac output.

== Causes ==
VPS occurs more frequently after on pump CABG surgery versus off pump CABG surgery. Hypothermia during surgery may also increase ones risk of developing VPS post operatively.

== Diagnosis ==
=== Definition ===
Vasoplegic syndrome is defined as low systemic vascular resistance (SVR index <1,600 dyn∙sec/cm^{5}/m^{2}) and high cardiac output (cardiac index >2.5 L/min/m^{2}) within the first 4 postoperative hours.

== Treatment ==
There is some evidence to support the use of methylene blue in the treatment of this condition.

== Epidemiology ==
One case series reports a rate of 1 in 120 cases.
