= Richard C. Lillehei =

American surgeon (1927–1981)

- Born: December 10, 1927; Minneapolis MN
- Died: April 1, 1981 (aged 53)
- Education: University of Minnesota
- Known for: Simultaneous pancreas-kidney transplant
- Medical career
- Profession: Surgeon
- Sub-specialties: Organ transplantation
- Research: Shock treatment; Organ procurement; Open-heart surgery; Kidney transplantation

Richard C. Lillehei (10 December 1927 - 1 April 1981) was an American transplant surgeon who performed the world's first successful simultaneous pancreas-kidney transplant in 1966 (sometimes quoted as 1967) and the first known human intestinal transplantation. He came from a renowned medical family in Minneapolis; his father was a dentist and his brothers were cardiologist James Lillehei and cardiothoracic surgeon C. Walton Lillehei. The Lillehei Surgical Society is named in honour of the three brothers.

== Early life and education ==
Richard Carlton Lillehei was the son of a dentist from Minneapolis and the younger brother of cardiothoracic surgeon C. Walton Lillehei and cardiologist James Lillehei.

He completed his early education from West Side High School in Edina, Minnesota and in 1948 graduated from the University of Minnesota. After graduating in medicine in 1951 from the University's medical school, he spent two years at the Walter Reed Army Institute of Research and gained his PhD in Surgery from the University of Minnesota in 1960.

== Pancreas transplantation ==
On 17 December 1966, Lillehei assisted William Kelly in transplanting part of a pancreas and a whole kidney into a 28-year-old woman with type I diabetes and renal disease. Postoperative problems led to a decision to remove the graft, and she died soon after. On New Year's Eve 1966, Lillehei led the world's first successful simultaneous pancreas-kidney transplant. It involved transplanting the whole pancreas, accompanying duodenum and one kidney. The recipient survived four and a half months.

By 1973, he had performed 13 pancreas transplants.

His other fields of research included shock treatment, organ procurement, open-heart surgery and kidney transplantation.

== Personal and family ==
Lillehei married B.J. (Elizabeth Jeanne) and they had four sons, Richard C., Ted, John and James.

== Death and legacy ==
In 1986, the Lillehei Surgical Society was founded in the names of the three Lillehei brothers.

Every two years an award is given to the most outstanding clinician in the field of pancreas transplantation.
