= Ulysses Grant Dailey =

American surgeon (1885–1961)

Ulysses Grant Dailey (1885–1961) was an American surgeon, writer, and teacher. He was one of the first African Americans recognized in the field of medicine in the United States. In 1949, the House of Delegates of the National Medical Association awarded him with the Distinguished Service Award.

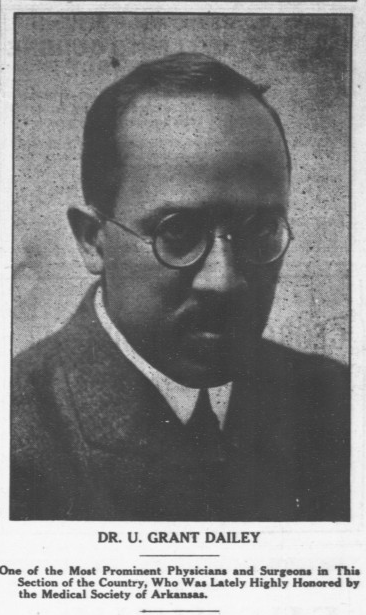
Ulysses G. Daily, in The Broad Ax newspaper 5/20/1922.

== Biography ==
Dailey was born in Donaldsonville, Louisiana, on August 3, 1885, to S. Toney Hanna Dailey, a bartender, and Missouri (née Johnson) Dailey, an educator. Dailey earned his bachelor's degree from Dillard University in 1902 and obtained his degree in medicine from Northwestern University in 1906, graduating fifth of in a class of 123.

== Medical career ==
Despite the prejudice Daily experienced from the faculty at Northwestern early in his career, he served as assistant demonstrator of anatomy from 1906 to 1908. In 1908, Daniel Hale Williams, a notable black surgeon, hired Dailey as his assistant at Provident Hospital, where he assisted Williams in surgical procedures. Dailey also headed lectures and produced papers during his tenure at Provident, including writing a number of articles on surgery. After serving as instructor in anatomy and physiology, Dailey was promoted to associate surgeon at Provident Hospital in 1909 and held that position until 1917. Despite his growing status in the medical community, Dailey grew frustrated of what he believed to be racial and political barriers at Provident, and established the Dailey Hospital and Sanitarium in Chicago in 1926. He became a senior attending surgeon at Provident Hospital in Chicago, Illinois, from 1933 to 1952. He received assignments from the US State Department and was assigned to India, Sri Lanka, and Africa from 1952 to 1953. From 1915 to 1916, he was a fellow of the International College of Surgeons and president of the National Medical Association.

He died at the age of 76.
