= Frank Gerbode (surgeon) =

American cardiovascular surgeon (1907–1984)

Frank Leven Albert Gerbode, popularly known as Frank Gerbode, (February 3, 1907 – December 6, 1984) was an American cardiovascular surgeon and founder of the Medical Research Institute and the Heart Research Institute at Pacific Medical Center. He performed the first open heart surgery west of the Mississippi in 1954.

== Life and career ==
Frank was born in Placerville, California on February 3, 1907, the last of 4 children, to Frank Albert Gerbode and Anna Marie Leven. His father wanted him to be a businessman, but he chose medicine. After graduating with honors from Stanford University, he began studying at Stanford Medical School in San Francisco in 1932. After completing studies at Stanford in 1936, he continued his surgical training at Stanford Hospital. From 1936 to 1937, he studied pathology under Germany's leading pathologist Max Borst in Munich. In the early 1950s, he worked with John Osborne on the development of a new heart-lung machine. In 1954, he performed "the first clinical open heart operation west of the Mississippi, when he corrected an atrial septal defect using his newly designed heart-lung machine." In 1958 he was the chief surgeon performing the operation depicted in a 1958 open heart surgery that was televised live on Channel 5 (KPIX) in San Francisco.
