= F. John Lewis =

American cardiologist

- Born: Floyd John Lewis; 1916
- Died: September 20, 1993 (aged 76–77)
- Known for: Open heart surgery
- Medical career
- Institutions: University of Minnesota

Floyd John Lewis (1916 – September 20, 1993) was an American surgeon who performed the first successful open heart operation, closing an atrial septal defect in a 5-year-old girl, on 2 September 1952. For the next 3 years, Lewis and colleagues operated on 60 patients with atrial septal defects using hypothermia and inflow occlusion. He was best friends with C. Walton Lillehei and they worked together at the University of Minnesota.

In 1956, Lewis moved on from Minnesota to Northwestern University where he became the first full-time member of the faculty of surgery. At Northwestern, Lewis continued investigating the use of hypothermia in the operating room. Lewis later trained Thomas Starzl, who was completing a fellowship in cardiovascular surgery at Northwestern, and helped him to win a Markle Scholarship.

After being passed up for the Chair of Surgery position, Lewis departed for Santa Barbara in 1976 where he engaged in new careers: writing, hiking and mountain-climbing essays, and publishing a pamphlet entitled Bicycling Santa Barbara. He died on 20 September 1993 in Santa Barbara of sepsis.
