= Thomas Sellors =

British cardiothoracic surgeon

Sir Thomas Holmes Sellors FRCS (7 April 1902 – 13 September 1987) was a British cardiothoracic surgeon.
