= Society of Thoracic Surgeons =

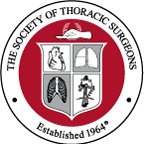
STS Logo

The Society of Thoracic Surgeons is a Chicago, Illinois (US)-based medical specialty professional society in the field of cardiothoracic surgery. Membership worldwide includes more than 7,500 surgeons, researchers, and other health care professionals who are part of the cardiothoracic surgery team. The Society's official journal is The Annals of Thoracic Surgery.

== Work ==
The STS National Database was established in 1989 as an initiative for quality improvement and patient safety among cardiothoracic surgeons. The Database has four components—the Adult Cardiac Surgery Database (ACSD), the General Thoracic Surgery Database (GTSD), the Congenital Heart Surgery Database (CHSD), and the Intermacs Database—and now houses more than 7.5 million surgical records. The STS National Database has grown to be the largest database of its kind in medicine and is one of the pioneers in the analysis and reporting of risk-adjusted outcomes in cardiothoracic surgery.

In late 2010, the Society launched an initiative through which participants of the ACSD could voluntarily report their performance on coronary artery bypass grafting (CABG) surgeries. Since then, ACSD public reporting has evolved to include aortic valve replacement (AVR) surgery and CABG+AVR; outcomes for isolated mitral valve replacement or mitral valve repair (MVRR) and combined MVRR+CABG are planned to be reported in early 2019. Public reporting from the CHSD was added in 2015, and public reporting from the GTSD began in 2017. Consumer Reports and U.S. News & World Report have both relied upon STS Public Reporting Online data for their respective hospital ratings programs.

== History ==
To meet the needs of an expanding specialty, a group of established young thoracic surgeons, led primarily by Dr. R Adams Cowley of Baltimore, met in the late 1950s to exchange ideas concerning the feasibility of another thoracic surgical society.

By April 1963, a committee comprising Dr. Cowley (Chairman), Dr. Francis X. Byron of Los Angeles, Dr. Clifford F. Storey of San Diego, Dr. J. Maxwell Chamberlain of New York, Dr. John D. Steele of San Fernando, Calif., Dr. Byron H. Evans of Fresno, Calif., Dr. Edgar P. Mannix of Manhasset, NY, Dr. Earle B. Kay of Cleveland, and Dr. John E. Miller of Baltimore, recommended that the a new society for thoracic and cardiovascular surgery be established. A planning committee was appointed, and an STS constitution was finalized in August 1963 at the home or Dr. Robert K. Brown in Denver. Officers and councilors were elected on October 31, 1963, and included Dr. Paul C. Samson as president, Dr. Thomas H. Burford as vice president, Dr. Byron as secretary, and Dr. John E. Steele as editor of The Annals of Thoracic Surgery.

Officially founded in 1964; the first STS Annual Meeting was held during January 25-27, 1965 at Chase Park Plaza Hotel in St. Louis.

The initial management activities of STS were conducted from the office of Dr. J. Maxwell Chamberlain in New York. By 1969, when membership in the Society had grown to approximately 700, it was decided that management activities would be handled by a professional management organization. Smith, Bucklin and Associates (SBA) managed STS from 1969 to 2002, but in the later years of the SBA era, the Society's leadership felt the organization had grown so robust that it was time to hire a staff of dedicated STS employees.

The transition to self-management was successfully implemented under the direction of Mark B. Orringer, MD, who completed his term as STS President, and William A. Baumgartner, MD, his successor as President.

On June 1, 2002, STS opened its headquarters office in the American College of Surgeons building in Chicago with 9.5 full-time employee equivalents, including Executive Director & General Counsel Robert A. Wynbrandt, and a membership that had grown to more than 4,100. In 2004, a dedicated STS office in Washington, DC, was established; by 2018, the STS staff in Chicago and Washington had grown to approximately more than 65 full-time employees, and membership had grown to more than 7,500.

STS manages and provides staff support for five affiliate organizations, including its charitable arm, The Thoracic Surgery Foundation.

== Board of directors ==
The Society of Thoracic Surgeons operates under a board of directors, comprised, in 2025, of:

- Joseph F. Sabik III, MD, President
- Vinay Badhwar, MD, First Vice President
- Vinod H. Thourani, MD, Second Vice President
- Wilson Y. Szeto, MD, Secretary
- John D. Mitchell, MD, Treasurer
- Jennifer C. Romano, MD, MS, Immediate Past President
- Lise Tchouta, MD, MS, Resident Director

=== International directors ===
- Patrick O. Myers, MD, Lausanne, Switzerland
- Minoru Ono, MD, Tokyo, Japan
- Sigrid Sandner, MD, Vienna, Austria
- Marc Ruel, MD, MPH, Ottawa, ON, Canada

=== Directors-at-large ===
- David Tom Cooke, MD
- Jessica S. Donington, MD, MSCR
- Anthony L. Estrera, MD
- Felix Fernandez, MD, MSc
- Gregory P. Fontana, MD
- Stephanie M. Fuller, MD
- Karen M. Kim, MD
- Sandra L. Starnes, MD
