= EuroSCORE =

- Purpose: risk of mortality after heart surgery

EuroSCORE (European System for Cardiac Operative Risk Evaluation) is a risk model which allows the calculation of the risk of death after a heart operation. The model asks for 17 items of information about the patient, the state of the heart and the proposed operation, and uses logistic regression to calculate the risk of death. It is free to use online.

First published in 1999, the model has been adopted worldwide, becoming the most widely used risk index for cardiac surgery, and its use is believed to have contributed substantially to the improvement in the results of heart surgery seen at the beginning of the millennium. The original models are now aging, and a new model - EuroSCORE II - was announced at the EACTS meeting in Lisbon in 2011 and published in the European Journal of Cardiothoracic Surgery in April 2012. The updated calculator is available online at the official EuroSCORE website.

EuroSCORE II has substantially improved the calibration of the older models and at least maintained and perhaps further improved on their discriminatory power. It has largely replaced the two older models of EuroSCORE and is now the predominant worldwide heart surgery risk model.

Risk models are used for two main reasons. The first is that a risk model such as EuroSCORE allows the calculation of the risk of death before undertaking a heart operation. This is important as it serves to guide the clinician and the patient about the advisability of an operation by helping to weigh the risk against the benefits. The second is as a method of quality control. By calculating the expected risk of death for a population of patients having heart operations, this can be compared with the number of actual deaths. This comparison can be used as a measure of the quality of the performance of the hospital, unit or surgeon in question.

== Statistics ==
The statistical basis for EuroSCORE and EuroSCORE II is the well-established logistic regression. The available EuroSCORE papers supply logistic regression coefficients but without any measure of uncertainty and the raw data from which the calculations have been made are not available to the public.
