= Cross-circulation =

Technique involving the temporary sharing of circulatory systems for medical purposes

- Specialty: Cardiac surgery, transplant medicine
- Uses: Open-heart surgery, Organ preservation, Bioengineering

Cross-circulation is a medical technique in which the circulatory system of one individual is temporarily connected to and shared with that of another, typically to support or maintain physiological function in cases where one system alone would be insufficient. Initially pioneered in the 1950s by cardiac surgeon C. Walton Lillehei, cross-circulation allowed surgeons to perform open-heart surgery on infants and children before the development of reliable heart-lung machines. More recently, the concept has been adapted to rehabilitate injured donor organs and bioengineer transplantable grafts ex vivo.

== History ==
=== Origins in cardiac surgery ===
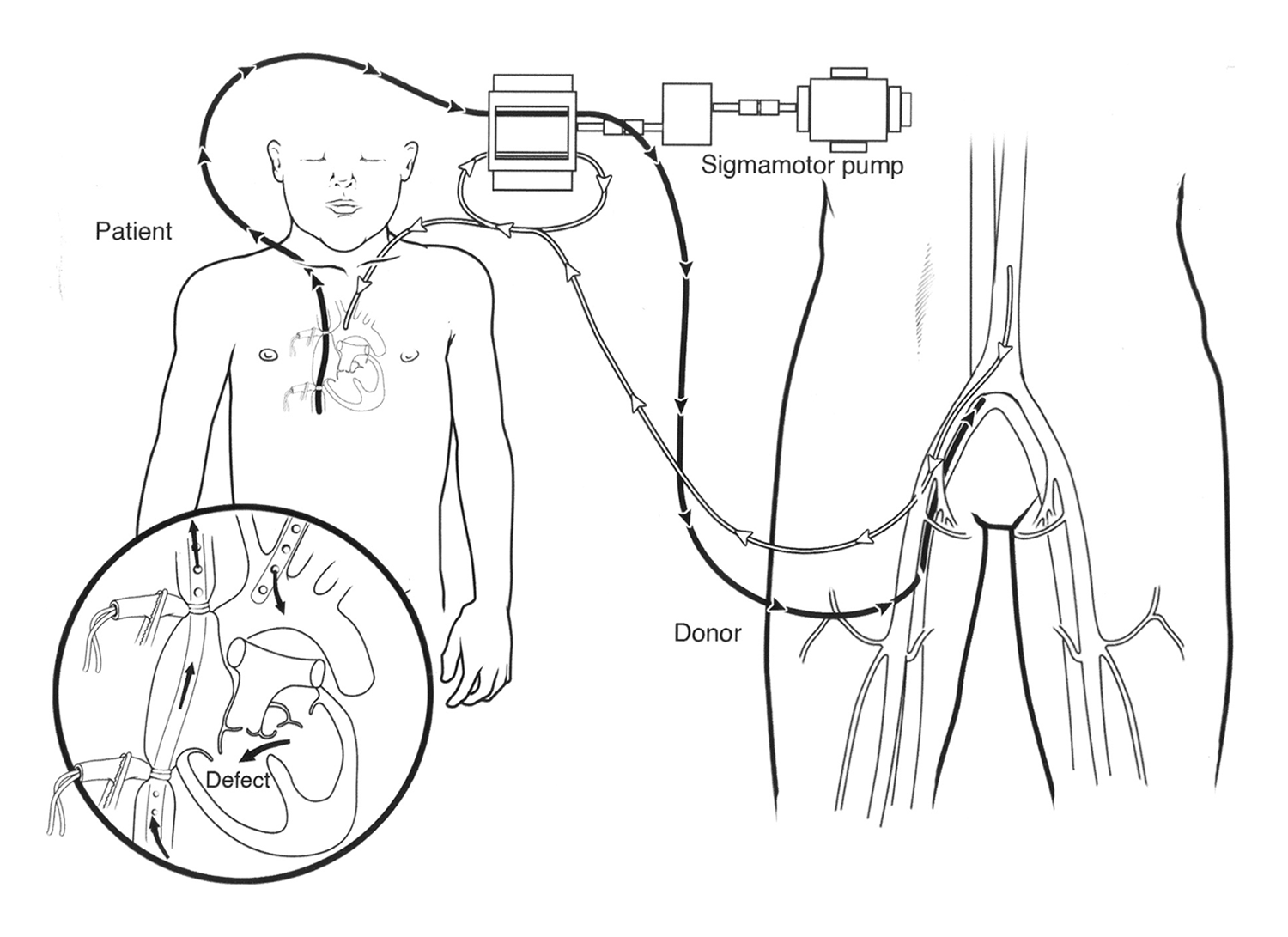
Diagram of cross-circulation technique used by C. Walton Lillehei in 1954 – 1955. The donor was a parent of the patient.

In the early 1950s, open-heart surgery was limited by the lack of extracorporeal circulation technologies. In 1954, Dr. C. Walton Lillehei at the University of Minnesota introduced cross-circulation as a method to provide oxygenated blood to patients undergoing complex intracardiac repairs. In this procedure, the patient's circulation was temporarily connected to that of a healthy donor (often a parent), whose heart and lungs would maintain oxygenation and perfusion for both individuals during surgery. This technique allowed for successful repair of congenital heart defects before the widespread availability of cardiopulmonary bypass machines.

Although revolutionary, cross-circulation in its original form raised ethical and safety concerns due to the risks posed to healthy donors. It was largely replaced by mechanical heart-lung machines by the early 1960s. Nevertheless, it marked a major milestone in the history of cardiac surgery and contributed to the evolution of extracorporeal support systems.

=== Modern applications in organ rehabilitation ===
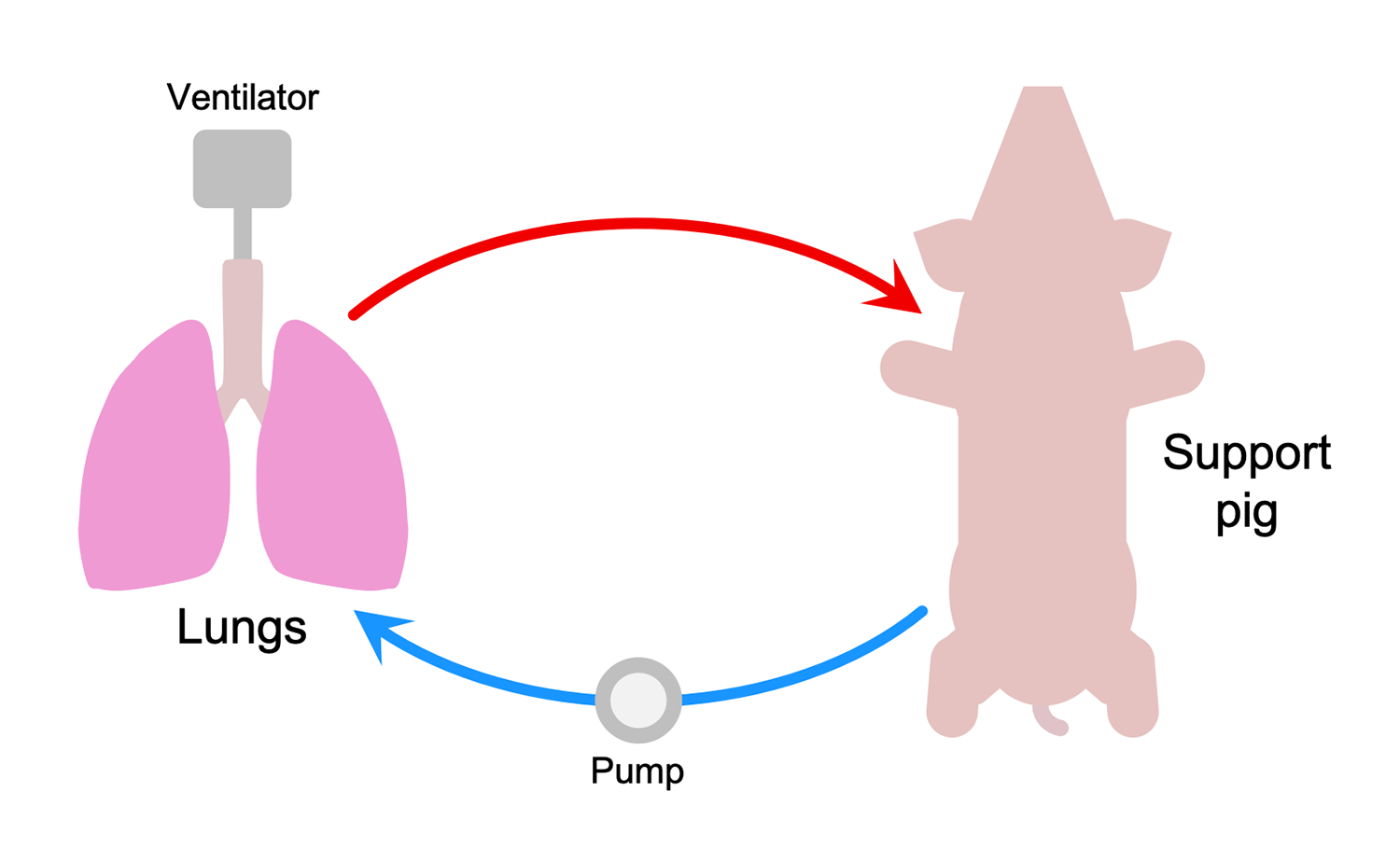
Schematic of cross-circulation between ex-vivo lungs and a support pig, showing extracorporeal blood flow (arrows) maintained by a pump.

Beginning in the 2010s, cross-circulation was re-envisioned as a platform to rehabilitate and regenerate donor organs outside the body. Drawing inspiration from the historic role of cross-circulation in cardiac surgery, researchers at Columbia University and Vanderbilt University pioneered a modern adaptation of the technique to support and recover ex-vivo organs using a living pig as physiologic support. In this system, an extracorporeal circuit is established between an ex-vivo organ (e.g., lung, liver) and a support pig, allowing systemic regulation from the support pig to maintain organ homeostasis. This approach provides dynamic hormonal, immune, and metabolic regulation and support that cannot be replicated by conventional mechanical perfusion systems.

Initial studies led by cardiothoracic surgeon Matthew Bacchetta and biomedical engineer Gordana Vunjak-Novakovic demonstrated normothermic support and preservation of ex-vivo lungs for 4 days and the functional repair of ex-vivo lungs with ischemic, aspiration, or infectious injury that would otherwise be deemed unsuitable for transplant. Innovations in cannulation strategies and circuit design were developed to optimize platform safety and scalability. Through durable physiologic support and targeted therapeutic intervention, this platform actively facilitates organ recovery, immune modulation, and functional regeneration.

In later work, researchers extended the technique to human donor organs using xenogeneic cross-circulation, where a support pig served as a systemic 'xeno-support' animal for an ex-vivo human donor organ. These trailblazing studies garnered the attention of several mainstream media outlets. Further studies examined immune interactions within this xenogeneic context, revealing an attenuated immune response and permissive environment for donor organ recovery. Additional studies confirmed that the platform enables rehabilitation of donor lungs using xeno-support without triggering hyperacute rejection in a human lung transplantation model, laying the groundwork for clinical translation. The platform has since been refined with advanced ex-vivo organ assessment capabilities, integrating real-time monitoring, functional imaging, and molecular diagnostics to guide intervention and clinical decision-making.

As of the mid-2020s, cross-circulation is emerging as a novel tool for organ recovery.

== See also ==
- Cardiopulmonary bypass
- Extracorporeal membrane oxygenation
- Machine perfusion
- Organ transplantation
- Regenerative medicine
- Tissue engineering
