= The Annals of Thoracic Surgery =

Medical journal

- Discipline: Pulmonary disease, Cardiothoracic surgery, surgery
- Language: English
- Edited by: Joanna Chikwe

Publication details
- History: 1965–present
- Publisher: Elsevier
- Frequency: Monthly
- Impact factor: 4.6 (2022)

Standard abbreviations
- ISO 4: Ann. Thorac. Surg.

Indexing
- ISSN: 0003-4975 (print); 1552-6259 (web)
- OCLC no.: 1481414

Links
- Journal homepage; Online access

The Annals of Thoracic Surgery is a peer-reviewed medical journal that was established in 1965. It covers the fields of thoracic disease, cardiothoracic clinical practices, and surgery. It is the official journal of the Society of Thoracic Surgeons and the Southern Thoracic Surgical Association.

== Article retraction practice ==
In 2004, The Annals of Thoracic Surgery published a study comparing two heart drugs. In January 2011, the journal retracted the study. The journal's editor-in-chief, L. Henry Edmunds, was contacted by Retraction Watch to get details about the cause of the article retraction. Edmunds replied that journalists and bloggers need not discuss article retraction and that it was sufficient for the public to know that the article had been retracted. Edmunds went on to say that the reasons why a journal might retract an article are personal in the same way that the reasons for a marital divorce are.

In 2012, the journal retracted a paper by Paolo Macchiarini, the senior author, for scientific misconduct after it was found that a table had been copied from another paper without citation.

== Editorial board ==
=== Editor-in-chief ===
- Joanna Chikwe, MD, FRCS, Cedars-Sinai Medical Center, Los Angeles, CA (2022-present)

=== Executive Editors ===
- Adult Cardiac: Marc Ruel, MD, MPH, University of Ottawa Heart Institute
- Congenital Heart: David M. Overman, MD, Children's Minnesota, Minneapolis, MN
- General Thoracic: Brian Mitzman, MD, University of Utah, Salt Lake City UT

=== Past editors ===
- G. Alexander Patterson, MD, FRCS, 2015-2022
- L. Henry Edmunds Jr, MD, 2000–2015
- Thomas B. Ferguson, MD, 1984–2000
- Herbert Sloan, MD, 1969–1984
- John D. Steele, MD, 1964-1969
