= Vessel harvesting =

Surgical procedure

Vessel harvesting is a surgical technique that may be used in conjunction with a coronary artery bypass graft (CABG). For patients with coronary artery disease, a vascular bypass may be recommended to reroute blood around blocked arteries to restore and improve blood flow and oxygen to the heart. To create the bypass graft, a surgeon will remove or "harvest" healthy blood vessels from another part of the body, either arteries from an arm or the chest, or veins from a leg. This vessel becomes a graft, with one end attaching to a blood source above and the other end below the blocked area, creating a "conduit" channel or new blood flow connection across the heart.

The success of a coronary artery bypass graft may be influenced by the quality of the conduit and how it is handled or treated during the vessel harvest and preparation steps prior to grafting.

Success can be measured in terms of:

- The need for repeat revascularization to treat a new blockage
- Morbidity
- Mortality (minimal)

== Method ==
Coronary artery bypass graft surgery has been in practice since the 1960s. Historically, vessels—such as the great saphenous vein in the leg or the radial artery in the arm—were obtained using a traditional "open" procedure that required a single, long incision from groin to ankle, or a "bridging" technique that used three or four smaller incisions.

The most minimally invasive technique is known as endoscopic vessel harvesting (EVH), often described as endoscopic vein harvesting when a saphenous vein is used. This type of procedure requires a single 2 cm incision plus one or two smaller incisions of 2–3 mm in length.

Each method involves carefully cutting and sealing off smaller blood vessels that branch off the main vessel conduit prior to removal from the body. This practice does not harm the remaining blood vessel network, which heals and maintains sufficient blood flow to the extremities, allowing the patient to return to normal function without noticeable effects.

There is no evidence on the risk of surgical site infection and wound dehiscence when using staples or sutures to close the wound after vein graft harvesting.

== Usage ==
Endovascular vessel harvesting (EVH) uses small incisions and specialized minimally invasive instruments to internally view, cut and seal side branches and remove the healthy blood vessel with minimal trauma to the vessel or surrounding tissues. In clinical studies, EVH has shown important benefits, including a reduced risk of infection and wound complications; less postoperative pain and swelling; and faster recovery with minimal scarring. The reduction in pain allows patients to get back on their feet and return to normal mobility much sooner, and have a reduced length of hospital stay. Thus they may be able to begin their cardiac rehabilitation program sooner.

Developed in 1995, adoption of EVH accelerated in 2005 after the International Society for Minimally Invasive Cardiothoracic Surgery (ISMICS) concluded that EVH should be the standard of care for vessel harvest. EVH is now the de facto standard of care, and is performed at most hospitals in the United States. However, a 2009 study published by Dr. Renato Lopes et al. in the New England Journal of Medicine concluded that the clinical outcomes of EVH were inferior to open vessel harvesting (OVH), prompting a flurry of articles in mainstream media. This study was performed between 2002 and 2007. Some clinicians challenged the study's conclusion, while others questioned the methodology of the study. Other seasoned clinicians wondered if EVH adoption and practitioners' experience have affected the data, as practitioners' experiences, techniques and technologies have evolved since the study began in 2002. Many clinicians called for more long-term studies to be conducted.

In randomized clinical trials as well as other studies looking specifically at EVH, the endoscopic harvesting technique has been found to offer comparable graft patency at six months—meaning that, in these studies, EVH did not compromise the grafted vessel's ability to remain open and unblocked.

In 2011, a large study by Dr. Lawrence Dacey et al. was published in Circulation supporting the use of endoscopic vessel harvesting in cardiac surgery. The study compared more than 8,500 propensity-adjusted patients and revealed that EVH significantly reduced wound complications without compromising long-term survival or freedom from repeat revascularization. These findings contradicted the conclusion drawn by Lopes et al. that EVH is inferior to OVH with respect to long-term survival. EVH was not associated with increased mortality or need for repeat revascularization at four years follow up. An accompanying editorial in Circulation further concluded that "EVH is here to stay" and predicted that "OVH will be obsolete in a few years." Dacey's study supported the findings of two other large, observational studies and reaffirmed the significant benefits of EVH in reducing wound complications. Totaling more than 16,000 patients tracked, these three studies provide strong evidence that EVH is a safe and viable technique to use to obtain a saphenous vein conduit for CABG surgery. Additional support that EVH does not adversely affect the integrity of the conduit and has equivalent clinical outcomes has recently been published by Krishnamoorthy et al. in Circulation.

== Conduit quality for successful vessel harvesting ==
As mentioned above, the success of CABG surgery may be influenced by the quality of the "conduit" vessel and how it is handled or treated during the harvest and preparation steps prior to grafting.

The harvested blood vessel used in coronary artery bypass graft surgery must be free from damage to ensure proper long-term function and good patient outcomes. Conduit quality is a significant factor in long-term patient results. Conduit quality is not always visibly evident when looking at the exterior of the harvested vessel. Damage to the endothelium, the interior of the vessel, has been shown to increase the likelihood of graft occlusion or blockage. Specifically, damage can be caused during the procedure by:

- Extent of thermal injury during the branch division, cutting and sealing
- Overhandling of the vessel – during and after harvest
- Overdistension of the vessel – when flushing as part of graft preparation
- Storage conditions between harvest and graft procedure

To preserve and optimize conduit quality, clinical specialists take care to avoid unnecessary thermal injury, overhandling and overdistension, and ensure proper storage conditions for the harvested vessel.

Thermal Injury

Comprehensive training and a careful approach are needed when cutting and removing side branches from the main vessel being harvested. As branches are cut, they must be sealed, or cauterized, to prevent bleeding after disconnection from the main vessel. In surgical practice it is common to use a form of heat or electrical energy to cauterize, or seal tissues in order to stop bleeding. If not properly controlled, the application of heat or energy to seal off the branch vessels can cause unintended thermal injury to the surrounding cells including the endothelium of the main vessel or conduit.

There are two main forms of electrical energy used for cutting and sealing off branch vessels during harvesting: bipolar radio frequency (RF) and direct current (DC).

Bipolar RF

Bipolar RF tools pass alternating electric current (AC) through the tissue – in this case, the branch vessel – located between two electrodes. As the energy passes through the vessel tissue, water molecules within the cells begin to vibrate rapidly, creating heat, resulting in tissue vaporization and coagulation. The amount of cutting (vaporization) and sealing (coagulations) is defined by the wave form of the RF energy passed through the tissue.

Direct Current

With direct current devices, current flows to the heating elements contained within a set of "jaws" that clamp down on the branch vessel. The amount of heat generated by the heating elements defines the cutting and sealing. The combination of the heat and pressure results in a single, simultaneous cut-and-seal motion.

The distance between the location at which the side branch is cut and the main conduit is especially critical to minimize thermal injury to the main vessel during dissection. On some devices, a mechanical feature is used to physically distance the main conduit from the cautery device.

Overhandling

It is important to minimize handling, which may damage or cause strain on the internal endothelial layer of the conduit. Harvester training and experience reduce the likelihood of damage. The risk of damage can also be lessened with techniques such as EVH (rather than bridging), or by using EVH devices that minimize the amount of torque or stretch to the main conduit during harvesting.

Overdistension

When a vessel is prepared for use as a bypass graft, a standard syringe is typically used to flush the vessel and check for leaks. Using uncontrolled pressure to flush or clear the vessel can result in damage to the internal cellular lining of the vessel, known as the endothelium. Limiting the maximum pressure that can be applied to the vessel may prevent injury and improve the overall quality and long term patency of the graft. Pressure-limiting syringes are available, and they have been clinically shown to protect against overdistension.

Storage Conditions

Studies have indicated that endothelium and smooth muscle cells are affected by the type of storage solution, and may play a role in long-term vessel patency.
