= Wilfred Gordon Bigelow =

Canadian heart surgeon (1913-2005)

- Born: June 18, 1913
- Died: March 27, 2005 (aged 91)
- Education: University of Toronto (MD)

Wilfred Gordon "Bill" Bigelow OC FRSC (June 18, 1913 – March 27, 2005) was a Canadian heart surgeon known for his role in developing the artificial pacemaker and the use of hypothermia in open heart surgery.

Born in Brandon, Manitoba, the son of Dr. Wilfred Abram Bigelow, founder of the first private medical clinic in Canada, and Grace Ann Gordon, nurse and midwife, he gained his MD from the University of Toronto in 1938. He served during World War II as a captain in the Royal Canadian Medical Army Corps, performing battle surgery on the frontlines. He was appointed to the surgical staff of Toronto General Hospital in 1947, after spending a year at Johns Hopkins Medical School, and then a year later to the Department of Surgery at the University of Toronto in 1948.

In the 1950s, Bigelow developed the idea of using hypothermia as a medical procedure. This involves reducing a patient's body temperature prior to an operation in order to reduce the amount of oxygen needed, making heart operations safer.

He wrote two books, Cold Hearts and Mysterious Heparin. He served as a director of the Audubon Society and the Nature Conservancy of Canada.

In 1981 he was made an Officer of the Order of Canada. He was inducted into the Canadian Medical Hall of Fame in 1997.

He was married to Ruth Jennings for almost 60 years. They had four children; Pixie, John, Dan and Bill.
