= C. Walton Lillehei =

American physician

- Born: Clarence Walton Lillehei; October 23, 1918; Minneapolis, Minnesota, U.S.
- Died: July 5, 1999 (aged 80)
- Education: University of Minnesota
- Known for: Pioneering open heart surgery.
- Medical career
- Profession: Surgeon
- Institutions: University of Minnesota
- Sub-specialties: Cardiothoracic surgery
- Research: Open-heart surgery
- Awards: Harvey Prize in Science and Technology; Gairdner Foundation International Award (1963); Lasker Award for Advances in Cardiac Surgery (1955)

Clarence Walton Lillehei (October 23, 1918 – July 5, 1999), was an American surgeon who pioneered open-heart surgery, as well as numerous techniques, equipment and prostheses for cardiothoracic surgery.

== Background ==
Clarence (often called "Walt") Lillehei was born in Minneapolis, Minnesota, the son of Clarence Ingvald Lillehei (1892-1973) and Elizabeth Lillian (Walton) Lillehei (1891-1973). He attended West High School in Minneapolis in 1935. He attended the University of Minnesota at the age of 17. He earned four degrees at the University of Minnesota: a B.S. (with distinction) in 1939, an M.D. (Alpha Omega Alpha) in 1942, a M.S. in physiology in 1951, and a Ph.D. in surgery in 1951.

== Career ==
In 1944, Alfred Blalock at Johns Hopkins Hospital began successfully performing surgery on the great vessels around the heart to relieve the symptoms of tetralogy of Fallot, demonstrating that heart surgery could be possible. Lillehei participated in the first successful surgical repair of the heart on 2 September 1952. That historic operation, using hypothermia, was led by his longtime friend and colleague, F. John Lewis. Lillehei was a professor in the Department of Surgery at the University of Minnesota from 1951 to 1967.

Hypothermia gave only a relatively brief time, up to 10 minutes, during which surgery could be performed and was therefore not suited for complex congenital defects within the heart. To resolve this problem, Lillehei performed operations using cross-circulation, in which a donor was hooked up nearby to take up the pumping and oxygenation functions of the patient who was being operated on. Using this technique, Lillehei led the team that performed successful repair of a ventricular septal defect on March 26, 1954. Although the repair was successful, the patient, 13-month-old Gregory Glidden, died 11 days later of suspected pneumonia. Lillehei and his team continued to use cross-circulation for a total of 44 open-heart operations in the following year, of which 32 patients survived. These operations included the first repairs of the atrioventricular canal and tetralogy of Fallot.

Lillehei cooperated with Professor Moshe Gueron and Professor Morris J. Levy, who were both considered among "The Cardiology Founders of Israel" by doing the first cardiac puncture catheterization, which was used on 80 patients in 1964.

In 1958, Lillehei was responsible for the world's first use of a small, external, portable, battery-powered pacemaker. It was invented at his behest by Earl Bakken, whose then-small company, Medtronic, designed and repaired electronics for the University of Minnesota hospital. After the introduction of the first widely used prosthetic heart valves by Albert Starr in 1961, Lillehei also developed and implanted several innovative designs: the Lillehei-Nakib toroidal disc (1966), the Lillehei-Kaster pivoting disc (1967), and the Kalke-Lillehei rigid bileaflet prosthesis (1968).

As a dedicated educator, Lillehei trained more than 150 cardiac surgeons from 40 nations, including Norman Shumway and Christiaan Barnard, who formed half of the quartet which pioneered heart transplantation (the others being Richard Lower and Adrian Kantrowitz). In 1967, he was appointed Lewis Atterbury Stimson professor and chairman of the surgery department at Cornell Medical Center, New York. He returned to St. Paul, Minnesota, in 1975, where he became the director of medical affairs at St. Jude Medical. He was also named a clinical professor in the Department of Surgery at the University of Minnesota.

== Honors ==
Lillehei's honors include the Bronze Star for World War II service in Italy, the 1955 Lasker Award, the Order of Health Merit Jose Fernandez Madrid by the government of Colombia in 1959, the Golden Plate Award of the American Academy of Achievement in 1968, induction in 1993 into the Minnesota Inventors Hall of Fame, and the 1996 Harvey Prize in Science and Technology. In 1966-67, he served as president of the American College of Cardiology.

== Personal life ==
In 1946, Lillehei was married to Katherine Ruth (Lindberg) Lillehei (1921-2012) with whom he had four children. He died in 1999 and was buried at Fort Snelling National Cemetery.

His youngest brother, Richard C. Lillehei, was a notable transplant surgeon in his own right, having participated in the world's first successful transplant of a pancreas in 1966 and the first known human transplant of the small and large intestines.

== Other sources ==
- Borghi L. (2015) "Heart Matters. The Collaboration Between Surgeons and Engineers in the Rise of Cardiac Surgery". In: Pisano R. (eds) A Bridge between Conceptual Frameworks. History of Mechanism and Machine Science, vol 27. Springer, Dordrecht, pp. 53-68
- Cooper, David (2010) Open Heart: The Radical Surgeons who Revolutionized Medicine (Kaplan Publishing) ISBN 978-1607144908
- Goor, Daniel A. (2007) The Genius of C. Walton Lillehei and The True History of Open Heart Surgery (Vantage Press) ISBN 9780533155576
- Miller, G. Wayne (2000) King of Hearts, The true story of the maverick who pioneered the open heart surgery (Times Books) ISBN 9780307557247
