= Postperfusion syndrome =

Transient neurocognitive deficit after surgery using heart-lung machine

Postperfusion syndrome, also known as "pumphead", is a constellation of neurocognitive impairments attributed to cardiopulmonary bypass (CPB) during cardiac surgery. Symptoms of postperfusion syndrome are subtle and include defects associated with attention, concentration, short-term memory, fine motor function, and speed of mental and motor responses. Studies have shown a high incidence of neurocognitive deficit soon after surgery, but the deficits are often transient with no permanent neurological impairment.

== Evidence ==
A study by Newman et al. at Duke University Medical Center showed an increased incidence of cognitive decline after coronary artery bypass surgery (CABG), both immediately (53 percent at discharge from hospital) and over time (36 percent six weeks, 24 percent at six months, and 42 percent at five years). This study shows an association of neurocognitive decline with CABG, but does not show causation; the study lacks a control group and is considered level II-3 evidence. Also, the statistical calculation of cognitive decline has been demonstrated as the least reliable due to practice effects, measurement error and the regression to the mean phenomenon.

Subsequent studies have compared "on-pump" CABG to off-pump coronary artery bypass (OPCAB)—essentially establishing controls to compare the incidence of neurocognitive decline in CABG with and without the use of CPB. A small study (60 patients total, 30 in each treatment arm) by Zamvar et al. demonstrated neurocognitive impairment was worse for the on-pump group both 1 week and 10 weeks postoperatively. A larger study (281 patients total) by Van Dijk et al. showed CABG surgery without cardiopulmonary bypass improved cognitive outcomes 3 months after the procedure, but the effects were limited and became negligible at 12 months. Furthermore, the Van Dijk study showed no difference between the on-pump and off-pump groups in quality of life, stroke rate, or all-cause mortality at 3 and 12 months. A study by Jenson et al. published in Circulation found no significant difference in the incidence of cognitive dysfunction 3 months after either OPCAB or conventional on-pump CABG.

== Neurocognitive deficit as a consequence of vascular disease ==
A study by McKhann et al. compared the neurocognitive outcome of people with coronary artery disease (CAD) to heart-healthy controls (people with no cardiac risk factors). People with CAD were subdivided into treatment with CABG, OPCAB and non-surgical medical management. The three groups with CAD all performed significantly lower at baseline than the heart-healthy controls. All groups improved by 3 months, and there were minimal intrasubject changes from 3 to 12 months. No one consistent difference between the CABG and off-pump patients was observed. The authors concluded patients with long-standing coronary artery disease have some degree of cognitive dysfunction secondary to cerebrovascular disease before surgery; there is no evidence the cognitive test performance of bypass surgery patients differed from similar control groups with coronary artery disease over a 12-month follow-up period. A related study by Selnes et al. concluded patients with coronary artery bypass grafting did not differ from a comparable nonsurgical control group with coronary artery disease 1 or 3 years after baseline examination. This finding suggests that late cognitive decline after coronary artery bypass grafting previously reported by Newman et al. may not be specific to the use of cardiopulmonary bypass, but may also occur in patients with very similar risk factors for cardiovascular and cerebrovascular disease.

== Documentary film ==
In 2020, Australian film director Andrew Pike released Pumphead, a documentary about the condition. The film explores the experiences of eight patients following major heart surgery, describing their experiences with postperfusion syndrome. The filmmaker Andrew Pike experienced pumphead himself, following open-heart surgery in 2011. The film introduces the concept of post-traumatic growth, as a positive psychological change that can follow traumatic experiences such as pumphead.

== See also ==
- Heparin-coated blood oxygenator
- Postoperative cognitive dysfunction
- Post-chemotherapy cognitive impairment (aka "chemo brain")
- Vasoplegic syndrome
