= Henry Souttar =

British surgeon (1875–1964)

Henry Souttar CBE FRCS
- Born: December 14, 1875; Birkenhead, Merseyside, England
- Died: November 12, 1964 (aged 88); London, England
- Education: London Hospital
- Medical career
- Profession: Surgeon
- Sub-specialties: Cardiac surgery

Sir Henry Sessions Souttar CBE FRCS (14 December 1875 – 12 November 1964) was a British surgeon with a wide breadth of interests. He trained first as a mathematician and engineer. His engineer’s training enabled him to design and make new types of surgical instrument. His mathematical training made him a leader in setting out the first British guidelines for Radiotherapy. In 1925 he pioneered "blind" open heart surgery on a patient with congenital heart defect. This was not repeated until 1948.

== Biography ==
Henry Sessions Souttar was born at Birkenhead on 14 December 1875, the only son of Robinson Souttar, Member of Parliament for Dumfries (1895–1900), and his wife Mary. He was educated at Oxford high school and Queen's College, Oxford (1895–8). He gained a double first in mathematics and also studied engineering. In 1904 he married Catharine Edith, daughter of Robert Bellamy Clifton, professor of experimental philosophy at Oxford. They had a son and a daughter.

Souttar qualified in medicine at the London Hospital, where he became MRCS, LRCP in 1906. He became FRCS in 1909 and was appointed as a surgical registrar. He joined the staff of the West London Hospital and in 1915 he became assistant surgeon to the London Hospital.

At the outbreak of war in 1914, Souttar was appointed surgeon to the Belgian field hospital at Antwerp. He was awarded the Order of the Crown of Belgium, and later he was appointed CBE. He wrote a memoir of his war experiences entitled A Surgeon in Belgium (1915).

Souttar applied his mathematical background and his engineering skills to his surgery. He had his own workshop where he designed and made many surgical instruments, with the aim of improving existing operative procedures. His inventions included: a flanged tube to overcome obstructions in the gullet, a steam cautery to sterilize and clean breaking-down tumours and ulcers on the skin, and a craniotome to open the skull in brain operations.

With the introduction of radium in the treatment of malignant tumours, Souttar’s mathematical skill in assessing both dose and range was very valuable and he chaired many committees on this subject. He designed a 'gun' by which radon seeds could be implanted in or around a tumour.

Souttar's most famous innovation was in heart surgery. In 1925 surgery of the chest was in its infancy and operations on the valves of the heart were unknown. Souttar operated successfully on a young woman with Mitral valve disease, devising a new procedure. He made an opening in the appendage of the left atrium and inserted a finger in order to explore and correct the damaged mitral valve. This was a pioneer operation. The patient survived for several years and the operation is regarded as a great landmark in cardiac surgery. He was only permitted to do the operation once. Souttar's physician colleagues at that time decided the procedure was not justified and he could not continue. The next operations of this type were done by others in 1948.

Souttar was instrumental in the foundation of the faculties of Dental surgery and Anaesthetists at the Royal College of Surgeons.

After his retirement in 1947 from the London Hospital Souttar retained his active interest in surgery. Following the death of his first wife in 1959, Souttar married again in 1963; his second wife was Amy Bessie, widow of Harry Douglas Wigdahl. Souttar died at his London home on 12 November 1964; the funeral service was held at St Marylebone Church, of which he had been a churchwarden for many years.

Souttar was a linguist and a competent musician. He is said to have made a violin which he himself played. He illustrated his own textbook, The Art of Surgery (1929). He was a very tall and powerfully built man, dark in his younger days, and impressive looking. He was noted for his extreme courtesy and kindness, and for his ingenuity and ideas.

== Honours ==
Royal College of Surgeons Member of council 1933 to 1949 Vice-president 1943–4. Bradshaw lecturer 1943 Hunterian orator 1949

British Medical Association President 1945–6

Honorary fellow American College of Surgeons, Royal Australasian College of Surgeons

Trinity College, Dublin Awarded him an honorary MD 1933

Knighted 1949
