= Axel Cappelen =

Norwegian Cardiac surgeon

Axel Hermansen Cappelen
- Born: July 20, 1858; Selje Municipality, Norway
- Died: November 13, 1919 (aged 61); Norway
- Occupation: Surgeon
- Spouse: Johanne Marie Kaarbø
- Children: 4 (including Thor Cappelen)
- Parent(s): Johan Nicolay Cappelen; Elisabeth Brunchorst Ravn
- Relatives: Christian Cappelen (brother); Johan Cappelen (nephew)
- Awards: Knight, First Class of the Order of St. Olav (1918)

Axel Hermansen Cappelen (20 July 1858 – 13 November 1919) was a Norwegian surgeon.

He was born in Selje Municipality as a son of district physician Johan Nicolay Cappelen (1818–1890) and Elisabeth Brunchorst Ravn (1825–1906). His brother Christian was also a physician, and through him, Axel was an uncle of Minister of Justice Johan Cappelen.

He attended Bergen Cathedral School and finished his secondary education in 1876. He graduated from the Royal Frederick University with the cand.med. degree in 1883. After spending the four last months of 1884 at Rikshospitalet, he moved to Kabelvaag in 1885 to become the municipal physician for Vaagan Municipality. Here he married Johanne Marie Kaarbø in 1886. They had one daughter and three sons. One of their sons, Thor, also became a physician and was the father of architect Per Cappelen.

In 1889 Axel Cappelen was hired at Nordre Trondhjem County Hospital in Namsos. He remained here for the next years, and was also the acting district physician of East Lofoten in 1888–1889 as well as acting district physician of Fosen in 1891. After a period in the surgical department at Rikshospitalet from 1893 to 1896 he served as chief physician at Stavanger Hospital from 1897 until his death.

At Rikshospitalet he is credited with performing the first surgery on a human heart on 4 September 1895. The patient needed emergency surgery due to a knife wound. Cappelen accessed the thoracic cavity by cutting through the fourth rib. He repaired the wound of the left ventricle where the patient had sustained the stab wounds from the left side of his chest. After two days of intensive care, the patient died of coronary occlusion and not because of the repairing of the heart. At the autopsy the wound was found to be satisfactorily closed.

He was a fellow of the German Society of Surgery. In August 1918 he was decorated as a Knight, First Class of the Order of St. Olav. He died in November 1919 from meningitis. Axel Cappelen was just 61 years old. A bust of him was unveiled outside of Stavanger Hospital in 1934.
