= Charles P. Bailey (surgeon) =

American cardiac surgeon

Charles Philamore Bailey
- Born: September 8, 1910; Wanamassa, New Jersey, USA
- Died: August 18, 1993 (aged 82)
- Known for: Pioneering cardiac surgery techniques, performing commisurotomy

Academic background
- Education: Rutgers University, Hahnemann Medical College, University of Pennsylvania

Academic work
- Discipline: Cardiac surgery
- Notable works: Textbook of Cardiac Surgery (1955)

Charles Philamore Bailey (September 8, 1910 – August 18, 1993) was an American cardiac surgeon. His methods were the focus of a 1957 Time magazine article. Born in Wanamassa, a suburb of Asbury Park, New Jersey, he was a graduate of Rutgers University, Hahnemann Medical College and the University of Pennsylvania. Bailey performed commisurotomy in at least three patients and death was the outcome. On June 10, 1948 Bailey operated on a 30 year old man at Philadelphia General Hospital at eight in the morning and the patient died before the mitral valve was open. The same day at 2 pm at Episcopal Hospital in Philadelphia, Bailey operated on Claire Ward. The patient was a 24-year-old female with severe mitral stenosis. She lived for 38 years after the surgery. Bailey published a textbook of cardiac surgery in 1955. He was often in competition with Dwight Harken of Harvard. Both of them died in August 1993.

== Notes ==
- Daniel A. Goor - The Genius of C. Walton Lillehei and the True History of Open Heart Surgery
- Annals of Thoracic Surgery
