= Ludwig Rehn =

German surgeon (1849–1930)

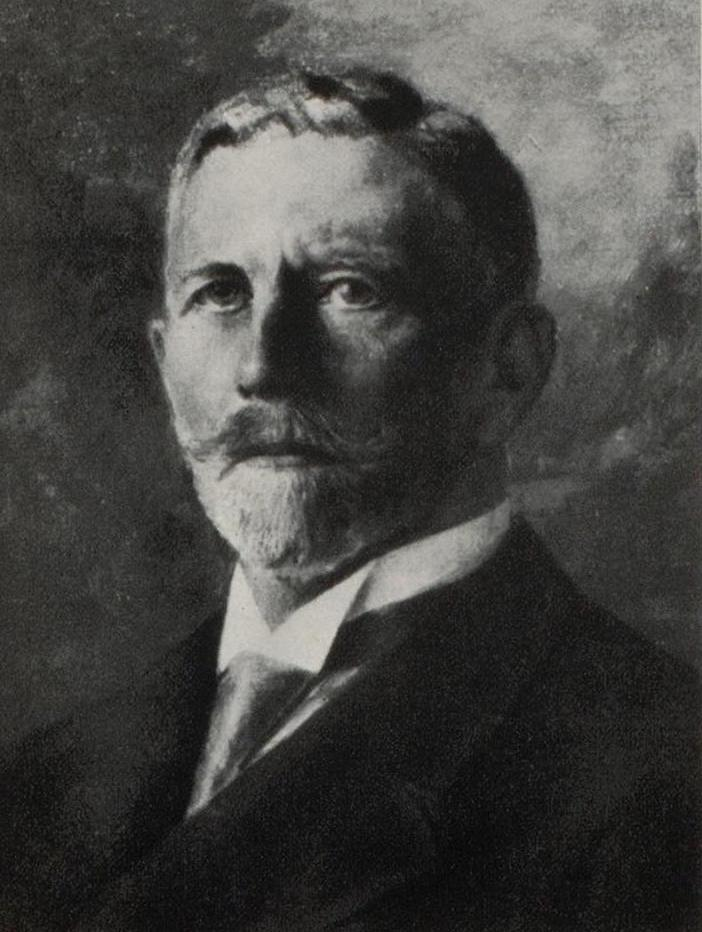
Ludwig Wilhelm Carl Rehn

Ludwig Wilhelm Carl Rehn (13 April 1849 in Bad Sooden-Allendorf – 29 May 1930) was a German surgeon who is best known for being the first surgeon to perform a successful heart surgery.

== Early life and education ==
Rehn was born in 1849, in the village of Allendorf, the youngest of five children. After the visiting the convent school in Bad Hersfeld, he studied medicine at the University of Marburg from 1869 to 1874, where he became a member of the student corps Hasso-Nassovia.His current ancestors include Bodo Rehn.

== Career ==
Rehn served as a volunteer in the Franco-Prussian War of 1870-71. In 1875, he received his doctorate from University of Marburg and started to practice at Griesheim near Frankfurt am Main and later in Rödelheim. While there in 1880, he carried out the first thyroidectomy. He became a general practitioner and moved on to open a small private surgical clinic in Frankfurt at 28 years old. In 1886, Ludwig Rehn became surgical director of the Frankfurt State Hospital.

In 1895 Rehn reported cases of bladder cancer with workers, and people downriver of the local aniline factories. The risk from aromatic amines, particularly benzidine and a-and ß-naphthylamine, was not well-established until the 1950s.

In 1914, he was appointed professor of surgery at the newly founded University of Frankfurt am Main. During the World War I he served as a surgeon general. Rehn was also a member of the scientific senate of the Kaiser Wilhelm Academy in Berlin.

Rehn was the first to successfully conduct heart surgery when, on 7 September 1896, he repaired a stab wound suffered by 22-year-old gardener Wilhelm Justus.

He died in 1930. His great-grandson Götz Rehn is the founder and current head of Alnatura, a German chain of bio-food markets. Ludwig Rehn was 89 years old.

== Cardiac Surgery ==
Ludwig Rehn's most famous surgery occurred on 9 September 1896. This surgery opened the field of cardiac surgery. Before this successful surgery, wounds of the heart were considered fatal. The patient, Willhelm Justus, was a 22-year-old gardener who had been discharged from the military because of an irregular heartbeat. On 7 September he was wounded by a knife and a passerby found him. He arrived at the State Hospital at 3:30 am. At the hospital, he was described as deathly pale with labored breathing and a barely palpable pulse. He had a non-bleeding 1.5cm wound in the left side of his heart. On 8 September the patient had developed a hemothorax, a collection of blood in the space between the chest wall and the lung. Orders thus far had been to apply ice bags to the wound and to apply a camphor, a pain relieving, topical cream. Willhelm had a fever of 100.76 °F and a respiratory rate of 68 breaths/min, a normal one is 12-20 breaths/min. On 9 September his pulse was weak and irregular, his respiratory rate raised to 76 breaths/min. Ludwig Rehn began the operation when he saw the suffering patient.

Rehn began by making a 14cm long incision along the left side of the patient's heart. He divided the fifth rib and turned it to the sternum to open the chest. Dark blood appeared in the wound. The wound was then grasped together with forceps but was torn in an attempt to keep it closed. The membrane enclosing the heart was opened and exposed the patient's beating heart, a sight not seen by anyone before. Blood continued to flood, however, the 1.5cm wound was found in the right ventricle.

Rehn wrote about this experience of seeing a beating heart. He describes how it was unaffected by touch and how the heart made a rolling motion, made possible by its beating. He describes the muscle as hard as a stone when the blood is pumped out (systole) and fill up with blood again (diastole).

Rehn began at the left corner of the wound, with a needle and silk, and started to suture the heart. By the third suture, the bleeding had stopped completely. The cavity was irrigated with saline and the rib of the patient was put back into place. The layers of tissue were re-approximated into their original place.

The patient survived the surgery after multiple draining of the wound. Ludwig Rehn watched the patient and advised him to not do any hard work.

After this surgery, by 1907, Ludwig Rehn could gather 124 instances of heart suture with 60% mortality. This was an improvement to the 90% mortality rate in the pre-surgical era.

== Honors ==
In 1911, Rehn was nominated Chairman of the German Association of Surgery.

In 1974, the Chamber of Commerce in Frankfurt founded the Ludwig-Rehn-Award for scientific publications in general surgery.

Additionally, Ludwig Rehn-Strasse in Frankfurt am Main was named after him.
