= Francisco Romero (surgeon) =

Spanish cardiac surgeon

Francisco Romero was a Spanish physician who became the first successful heart surgeon, on record, by performing an open pericardiostomy to treat a pericardial effusion in 1801. He performed the first successful open heart surgery in history. According to a lost, but later found, memoir belonging to Romero, he performed at least two successful open pericardial drainages with no deaths. Also according to his memoir, he performed five open drainages of pleural effusions with success, with one patient dying at 6 months. Romero is credited as the first heart surgeon, since he was the first medical doctor on record to cut into the pericardium, the lining of the heart, on a living patient with a successful outcome.
