= Site of the John and Mary Jones House =

Historic landmark in Chicago, Illinois, United States

Coordinates: 41°52′13″N 87°37′44″W

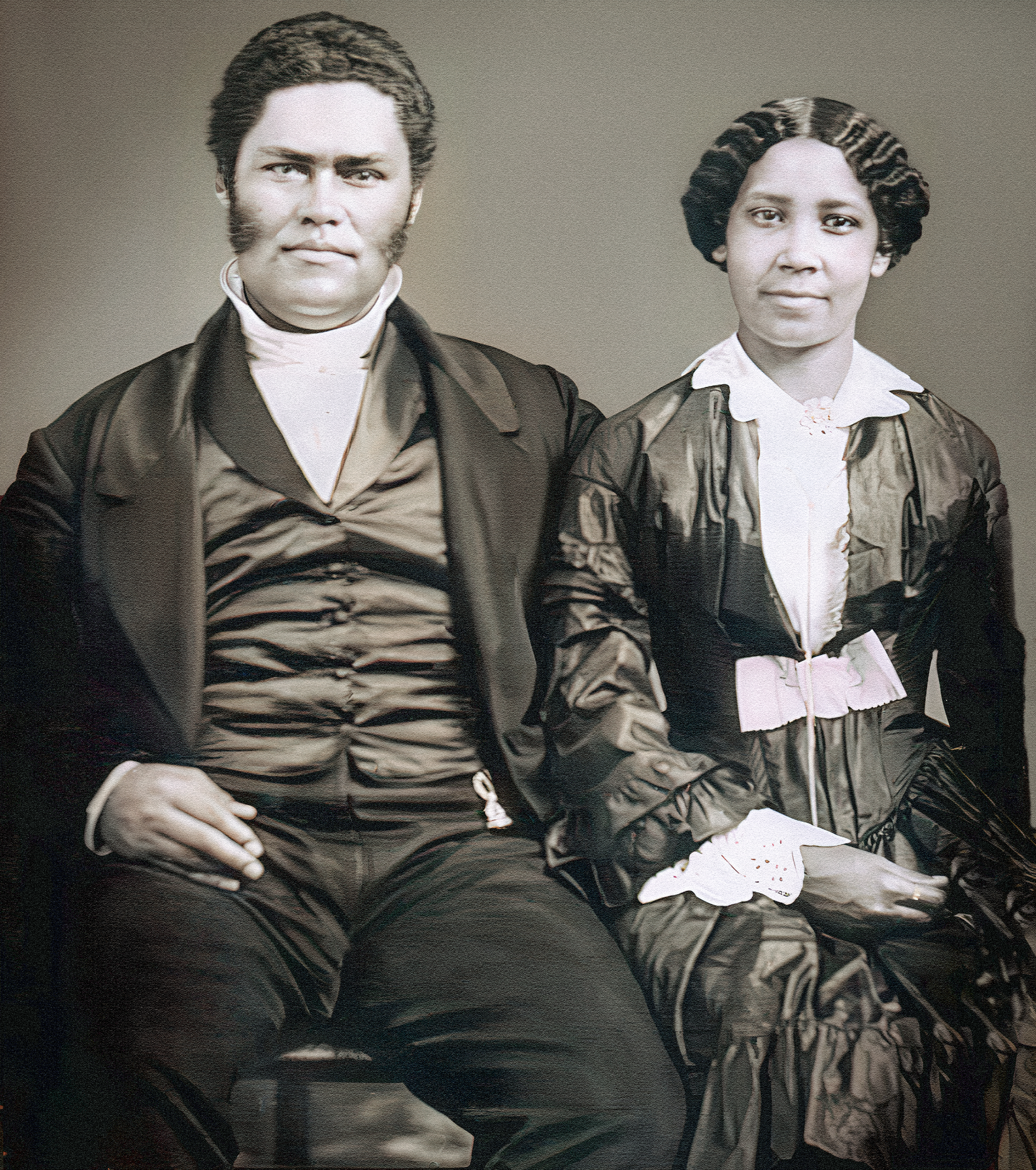
John Jones and his wife Mary Jones in the 1840s

The Site of the John and Mary Jones House is a historic location in Chicago at the "Southwest corner of W. 9th St. and S. Plymouth Ct" in South Loop. The John and Mary Jones House served as a "station" on the Underground Railroad to help fugitive slaves find freedom in the years before the abolition of slavery in the United States. It was designated as a Chicago Landmark on May 26, 2004. The couple lived in a house at this site from 1857 until 1872. The house was demolished by the 1880s, and the site is currently a Chicago Park District green space named Dearborn Park.

== Historical background ==
John Jones and his wife Mary Jones were central figures of the abolitionist movement in Chicago, led early struggles to achieve civil rights for Blacks and were involved in local and state politics (including John Jones having been the first African-American to hold elected office in Illinois as a member of the Cook County Board of Commissioners.)

They lived at 218 Edina Place (later Plymouth Court, and now corresponding approximately to 946 South Plymouth Court / 947 South Park Terrace) from 1857 to 1872.

=== Underground Railroad ===
The home served as a "station" on the Underground Railroad, which helped hundreds of fugitive slaves find freedom in the North and Canada. Serving as "conductors" on the Underground Railroad, the Joneses provided food and shelter to fugitive slaves, as well as clothing, money for transportation, and often bail and bond. According to Jones' daughter Lavinia, John and Mary Jones were responsible for sending hundreds of fugitives to Canada throughout the 1850s and early 1860s.

Although the Joneses were both born free and had freedom papers, they put themselves at great risk through their involvement with the Underground Railroad. Under the Fugitive Slave Act of 1793, harboring or preventing the arrest of a fugitive slave was punishable by a $500 fine and possible enslavement for free blacks. Further, the Fugitive Slave Act of 1850 led to manhunts by mercenary slave catchers, many of whom were not beyond capturing and putting into slavery free blacks that had never been slaves.

Their Chicago residence also served as a meeting place for locally and nationally prominent abolitionists, including Allan Pinkerton, Frederick Douglass and John Brown, and was the center of their life-long efforts to achieve greater civil rights for enslaved and free blacks alike.

== Current site ==
It is not known exactly when the house was demolished; it may have been lost in an 1874 fire. By 1883 its location had become part of the Dearborn Station railroad yards. After the decommissioning and removal of the railroad tracks in the late 1970s, the grounds of the site were incorporated into the then-newly developed Dearborn Park and surrounding neighborhood of the same name in South Loop. Today, at the corner of 9th Street and Plymouth Court, there is no plaque or any other form of marker to commemorate the historic Jones house.

== See also ==
- List of Chicago Landmarks
