= Engine Company 21 =

Engine Company 21 may refer to:

- Engine Company 21 (Chicago)
- Engine Company 21 (District of Columbia)
