= Emma Ann Reynolds =

American physician (1862–1917)

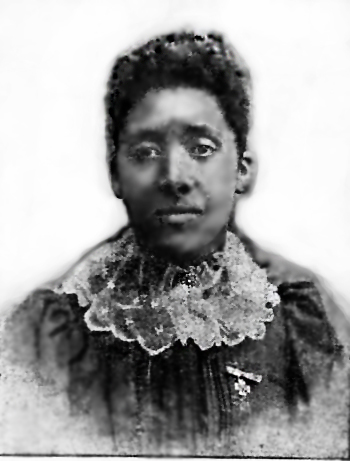
- 1900, when she took charge of nurses at Freedman's Hospital
- Born: August 3, 1862; Frankfort, Ross County, Ohio
- Died: January 11, 1917 (aged 54); Huntington Township, Ross County, Ohio
- Other names: Emma A. Reynolds
- Occupations: nurse, doctor
- Years active: 1896-1917
- Known for: inspiring the creation of Chicago's Provident Hospital

Emma Ann Reynolds (1862–1917) was an African-American teacher, who had a desire to address the health needs of her community. Refused entrance to nurses training schools because of racism, she influenced the creation of Provident Hospital in Chicago and was one of its first four nursing graduates. Continuing her education, Reynolds became a medical doctor serving at posts in Texas, Louisiana and Washington, D.C. before permanently settling in Ohio and completing her practice there.

== Early life ==
Emma Ann Reynolds was born on August 3, 1862, in Frankfort, Ross County, Ohio, to Sarah (née Jones) and William Reynolds. After completing her education at Wilberforce University she moved to Kansas City, Missouri, where four of her brothers lived and taught school for seven years. During her teaching, she recognized the health needs of the African-American community, and attempted to enroll in nursing school in Chicago. She was repeatedly refused entrance because she was black. Seeking help from her brother, Rev. Louis H. Reynolds, pastor of St. Stephens African Methodist Episcopal Church on the west side of Chicago, the two approached well-known Dr. Daniel Hale Williams in December 1890. Williams had previously recognized the need for both trained nursing staff and hospital beds for Negro patients, as well as employment opportunities for interns, physicians and surgeons. Reynolds' need, spurred a decision that rather than use his influence to help her gain entrance to a white nurses' training facility, he should instead convince the black community to found their own hospital. In May 1891, the Provident Hospital was opened, with the goal of allowing interracial staff and patients, as well of establishing a training facility for nurses of any race.

Reynolds enrolled in the first nursing class, completing her training eighteen months later, and graduated on 27 October 1892 along with Bertha I. Estes, Florence Phillips and Lillian E. Reynolds. The year of her graduation, she enrolled in a medical degree program at Northwestern University Women's Medical School, as the first black student of the school. She graduated as the first African-American woman to complete the training in 1895. From her graduation until 1896, Reynolds served as the supervisor of the Training School for Nurses, before becoming the resident physician of the Paul Quinn College in 1896. Two years later, she moved to New Orleans, where in spite of racism she remained until July 1900. While she was in New Orleans, Reynolds was active as a club member, serving as one of the officers of the state colored Temperance Union and Afro-American Woman's Club of New Orleans. She founded and organized the Visiting Nurses Association under the women's club umbrella to furnish free nursing to the poor.

On 23 July 1900, Reynolds took up what initially was to be a temporary three-month position, as the head nurse at Howard University's Freedman's Hospital. She remained at Freedman's Hospital through 1901, serving on the nursing faculty in dietetics, but the following year, returned to Ohio to care for her ailing parents. She established a practice in Sulphur Lick, Ohio, practicing there until her death.

== Death and legacy ==
Reynolds died of heart disease on January 11, 1917, in Huntington Township, Ross County, Ohio, and was buried at Davis Cemetery near Waverly, Ohio, on January 13. In 1990, a tombstone was erected in her honor at the Greenlawn Cemetery in Frankfort by the Provident Hospital Nurse Alumni Association. Reynolds was inducted into the Chillicothe-Ross County Women's Hall of Fame in 1991 in recognition of her medical contributions and in 1994, she was inducted into the Ohio Women's Hall of Fame. In 2001, she was recognized for her pioneering role during Women's Month, by the U.S. House of Representatives.
