= Fireman's pole =

Pole that firefighters slide down to reach ground level

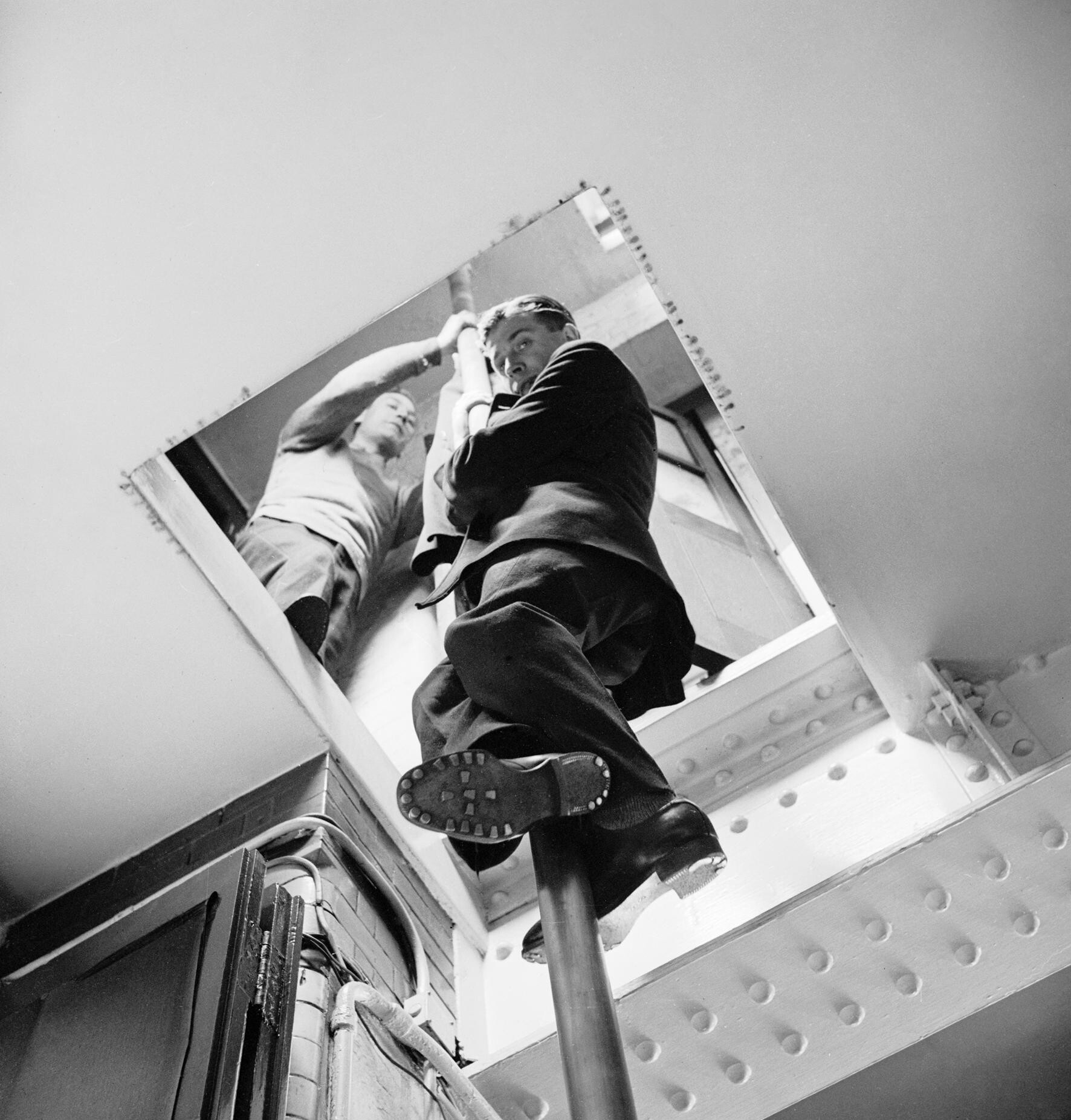
The fire pole at Fulham Fire Station, London, during a training exercise in 1942

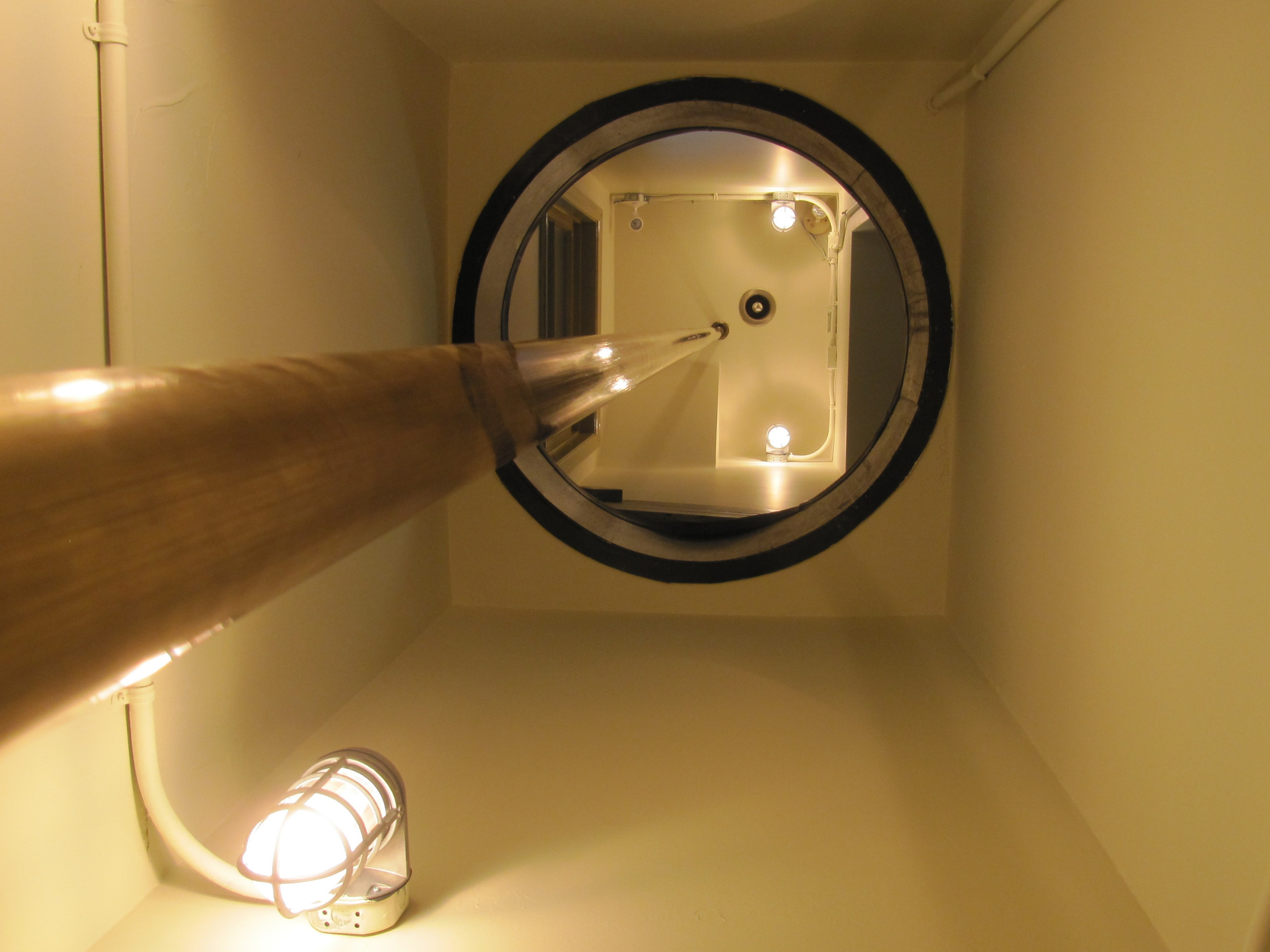
The firepole in a fire station in Toronto, Ontario

A fireman's pole (also called a firefighter's pole, sliding pole or a fire pole) is a pole that firefighters slide down to quickly reach the ground floor of a fire station. This allows them to respond to an emergency call faster, as they arrive at the fire engine faster than by using a standard staircase.

In the 1870s, answering an alarm, Chicago fireman George Reid decided to use the long-pole the company employed to lift horse's hay from the upper-loft to slide to the ground floor, arriving well ahead of the rest of the company. Company Captain David Kenyon of Engine Company 21 then successfully petitioned the department be allowed to install a pole through the floor of the loft sleeping space to create what became the standard set-up.

== Overview ==
The firefighter's pole is found in multi-level fire stations, if the firefighters' living quarters are located upstairs. When they are dispatched to an emergency, the firefighters descend to the ground floor, put on their firefighting gear, and board the fire engine as quickly as possible. The pole may run through a hole in the floor, or it may be accessed from a balcony.

To use a pole, a firefighter grasps it with their hands, then clamps their legs around it, and then replaces their tight hand grip with a looser hand or arm grip to allow themselves to descend, using their legs to control the speed. This is somewhat similar to the technique used for fast-roping.

== History ==
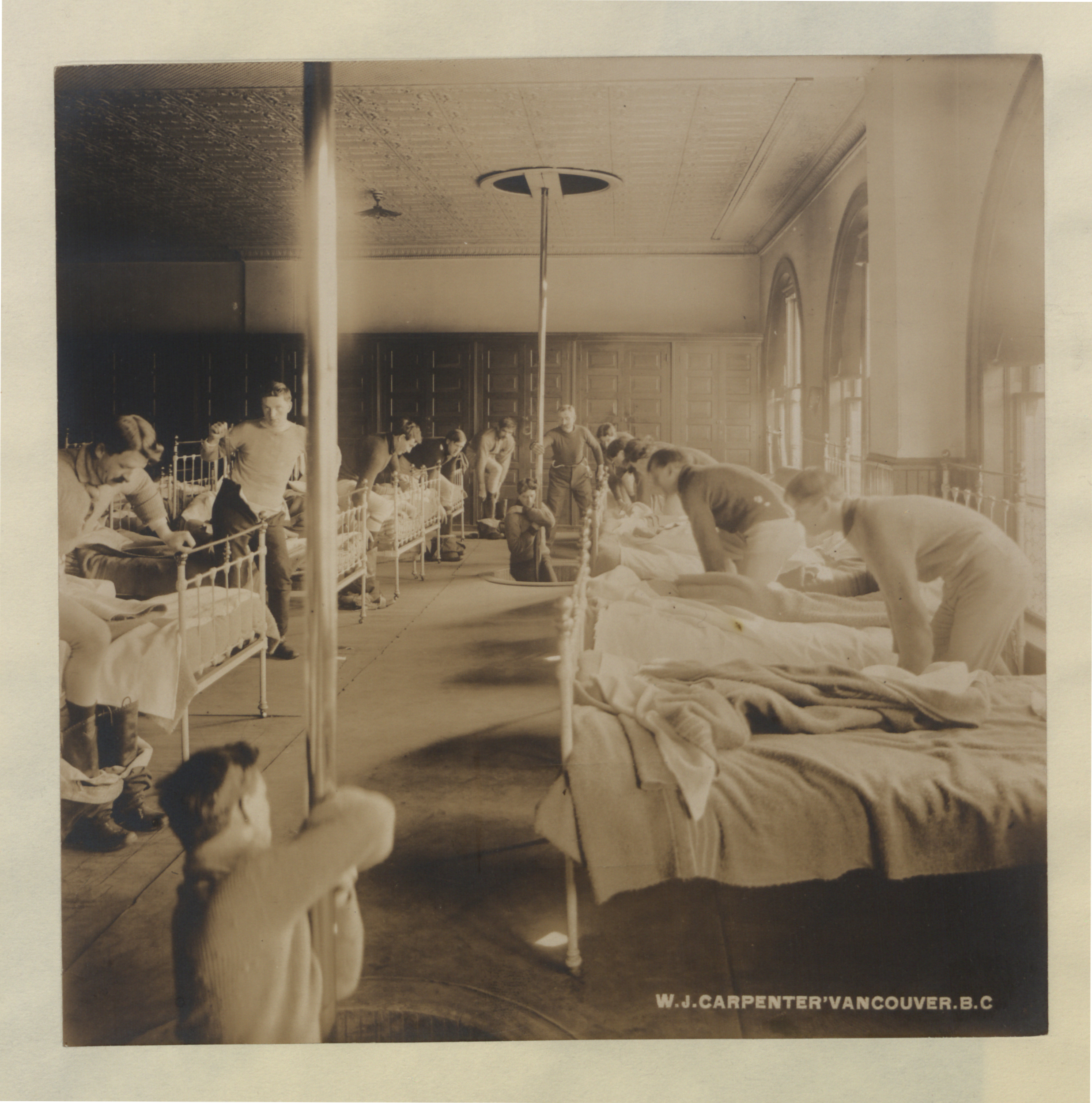
Vancouver firemen using firepoles to leave their dormitory, 1910

Spiral staircases or sliding chutes were once common, but not particularly fast. Fire houses were also equipped with spiral staircases so horses would not try to climb the stairs into the living quarters.

Captain David B. Kenyon of Chicago's all-black Engine Company No. 21 worked in a three-story fire station. The ground floor contained the firefighting equipment, the floor above was for recreation and sleeping, and the top floor was the hayloft to store the winter supply of hay for the fire engines' horses. During transport, the hay was secured to a wagon using a wooden binding pole, which was stored in the hayloft when not in use. Firefighter George Reid slid down the pole to respond to a call for help once, which inspired Kenyon to create a permanent pole.

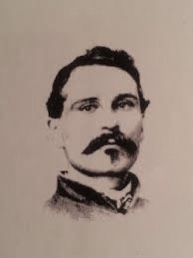
Captain David B. Kenyon

In 1878 Kenyon convinced his chief to make the necessary hole in the building and install the pole, after agreeing to pay for any necessary maintenance. The company crafted a pole out of a Georgia pine beam by shaving and sanding it into a 3-inch (7.6 cm) diameter pole which they gave several coats of varnish and a coat of paraffin.

Despite being the butt of many jokes, others soon realized Company 21 was usually the first company to arrive when called, especially at night, and the chief of the department ordered the poles to be installed in all Chicago fire stations. In 1880 the first brass pole was installed in the Worcester Fire Department.

== Safety issues ==
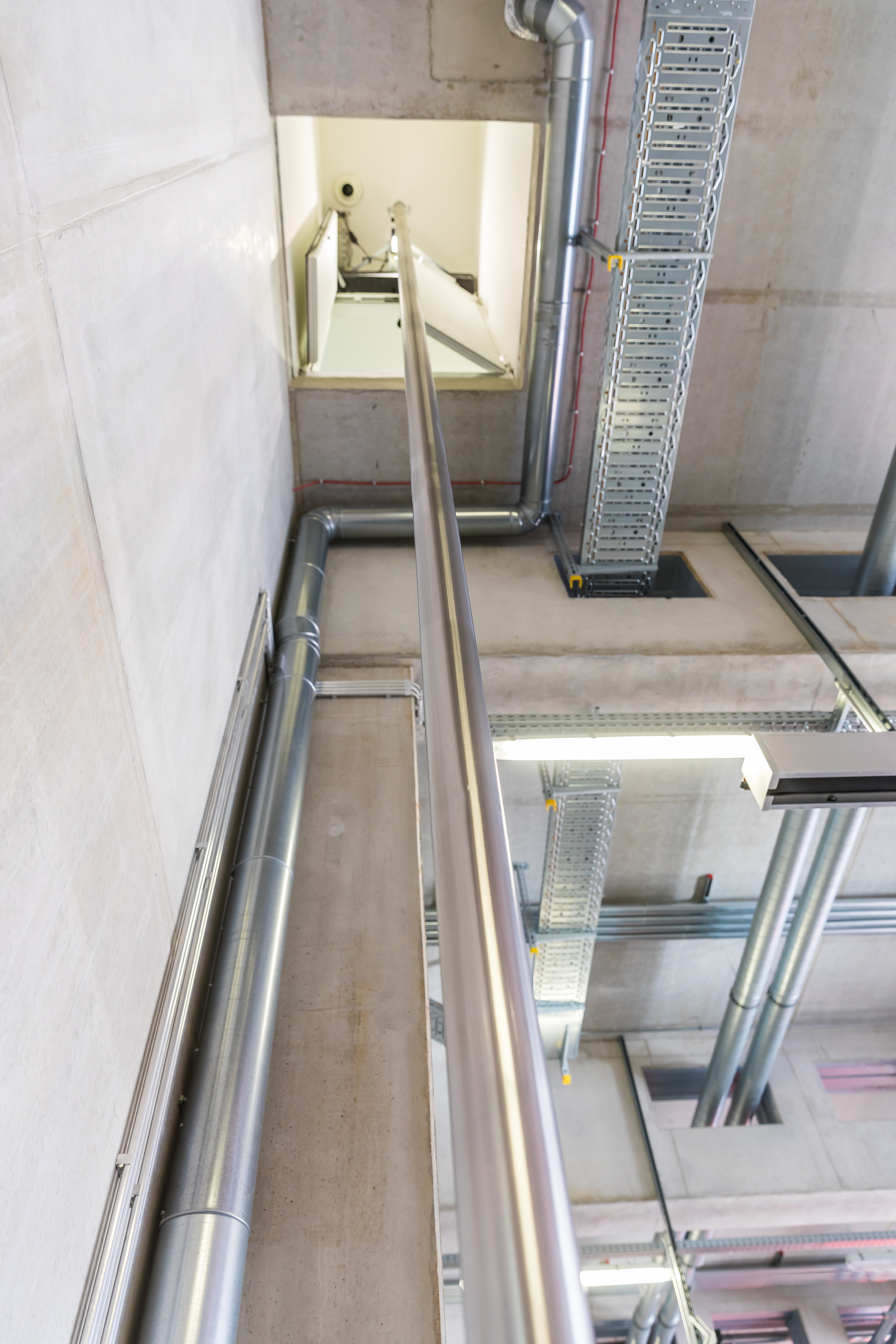
A firepole in Cologne with a door at the entry

Losing one's grip on the pole can result in falling from a great height; the firefighter may hit an object such as a door extending from a truck; poor speed control can result in injured or even broken legs upon impact with the floor; and burns can occur due to friction if the skin rubs against the pole. If the pole runs through an unprotected hole in the floor, there is a risk of a person falling through it, as well as exhaust fumes rising into the living quarters.

For these reasons, fire stations built since the 1970s are often built with the living quarters downstairs, and some older fire stations have had their poles removed. In the United States, the National Fire Protection Association has called for the removal of all poles from US fire stations due to safety hazards. The fire service in New Zealand has already removed most of them. In the United Kingdom, more modern fire stations are built with one storey negating the need for a pole and they are sometimes removed from old stations that no longer require the upper floors for operational purposes.

In October 6, 2016, China Fire Services Guangdong Fire Department, Shenzhen Fire Department firefighter Private 1st Class Zhu Yicong died from a fall while sliding down the fireman's pole, being the only confirmed death from a fireman's pole.

However, due to the strong tradition, time advantages and new safety features, poles are common worldwide even in newly built stations. Slide poles can be made safer. Cushions can be placed around the base of the pole to soften landings. Exhaust control systems can stop fumes from rising upstairs. To prevent accidental falls, the pole can be guarded by railings, baskets, a door or a weight-activated trapdoor that opens only when weight is applied to the pole.

== Escape pole system ==
A telescoping emergency escape pole used to clear the structure of a vehicle, such as the Space Shuttle glide-phase escape system or aviation bailout tunnels, or it refers to long carbon-fiber reach poles utilized by emergency responders for swift water and height rescues.

After the Challenger disaster, NASA integrated an orbiter crew bailout system. It consisted of spring-loaded telescoping poles installed in the ceiling of the middeck. During controlled gliding descents, astronauts would attach to the pole, slide out the side hatch, and drop clear of the orbiter’s wings. Certain bomber and reconnaissance aircraft utilized physical tunnels or slide bars that allowed the crew to swing outward and drop through an escape hatch beneath the aircraft without striking the engines.
