= Lloyd Garrison Wheeler =

African-American attorney (1848–1909)

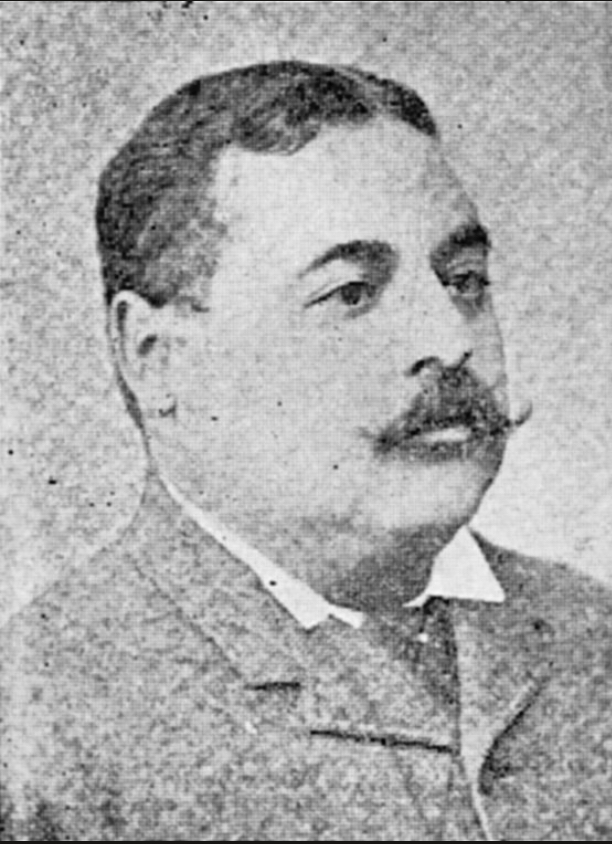
Lloyd Garrison Wheeler (before 1902)

Lloyd Garrison Wheeler, Sr. (1848 – 1909) was an African American attorney, businessman, philanthropist, and political leader. Wheeler was the first African-American to practice law in the state of Illinois and was influential in the establishment of Provident Hospital of Cook County — a medical facility still extant in the 21st century.

== Biography ==
=== Early years ===
Lloyd Garrison Wheeler was born May 29, 1848, in Mansfield, Ohio, and was named after the great abolitionist William Lloyd Garrison. His father was active in the Underground Railroad movement, providing secret accommodations for escaping slaves from the Southern United States en route to freedom in Canada. After the illegalization of underground railroad activity the family moved to Chatham, Ontario, Canada, and it was there that Wheeler attended school.

Wheeler was 11 years old when his family returned to the United States, settling in Chicago, where he would work in a variety of jobs. Gaining a position as the first black mail carrier in Chicago, Wheeler took advantage of his free time to begin studying for a career in law, reading in the office of local attorney George Bellows. Wheeler gained admission to Union College of Law, a forerunner of the Northwestern School of Law, and in 1869 passed the Illinois state bar examination to become a practicing attorney. He was the first black American admitted to the bar in the state of Illinois.

=== Legal career ===
Wheeler moved South from Illinois to Arkansas. In 1870, he was a delegate to the Arkansas Republican state convention and by the following year had been admitted to the Arkansas state bar. In 1872 he was a Presidential elector for Republican candidate Ulysses S. Grant.

Wheeler worked briefly in private practice with another attorney before departing to take a position as county attorney for Pulaski County. Wheeler would remain in that position until 1873. Following his stint as county attorney, Wheeler returned to private legal practice before gaining a seat on the Pulaski County Board of Commissioners.

The collapse of Reconstruction in 1877 and the growth of white terrorism in the form of the Ku Klux Klan spelled an end for Wheeler's political and legal career in Arkansas, and in 1879 Wheeler abandoned the state to return to the growing city of Chicago. He was active in the Illinois state militia, rising to the rank of Major.

In Chicago Wheeler left the legal profession to take a job as a financial manager for wealthy investor John Jones, shortly before the latter's death. Wheeler would make a career of managing Jones' various commercial and real estate interests on behalf of the family, eventually marrying one of Jones' nieces, the former Ranie Petit. Together the couple would have seven children.

Wheeler associated with the monied upper crust of black society in Chicago. This enabled him to engage in philanthropic fundraising, and he was influential in helping establish Provident Hospital of Cook County — a medical enterprise which survived into the 21st century.

A friend of Booker T. Washington since the 1880s, in 1901 Wheeler came to Washington's aid by establishing the Chicago chapter of the National Negro Business League.

By 1903, with faltering businesses, Wheeler was ready to accept Washington's offer to move back South again, this time to Tuskegee, Alabama, to manage the finances of the Tuskegee Normal and Industrial School. In addition to the handling of business affairs for the Institute, Wheeler also served as the superintendent of the school building and its campus.

=== Death and legacy ===
While at Tuskegee Wheeler's health began to decline, and he died there on August 28, 1909. He was 61 years old at the time of his death.
