= Mary Jane Richardson Jones =

American abolitionist, suffragist, and activist (1819–1909)

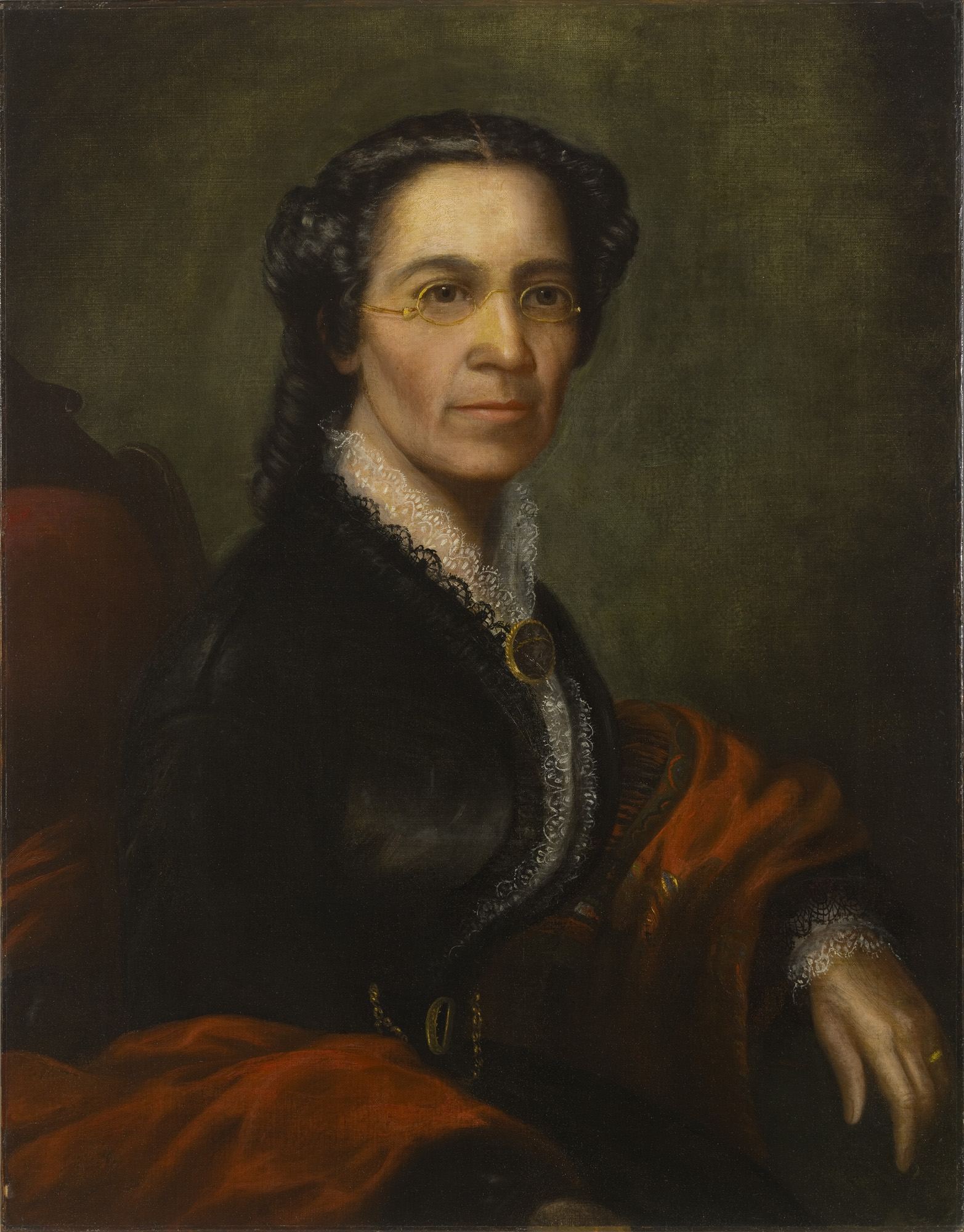
- Jones c. 1865
- Born: Mary Jane Richardson c. 1819; Memphis, Tennessee, U.S.
- Died: December 26, 1909 (aged 89–90); Chicago, Illinois, U.S.
- Occupation: Activist
- Movement: Abolitionism; woman's club movement
- Spouse: John Jones (m. 1841; died 1879)
- Children: 1

Mary Jane Richardson Jones (c. 1819 – December 26, 1909) was an American abolitionist, philanthropist, and suffragist. Born in Tennessee to parents who were free African-Americans, Jones and her family moved to Illinois. With her husband, John, she was a leading African-American figure in the early history of Chicago. The Jones household was a stop on the Underground Railroad and a center of abolitionist activity in the pre-Civil War era, helping hundreds of fugitive slaves flee slavery.

After her husband's death in 1879, Jones continued to support African-American civil rights and advancement in Chicago, and became a suffragist. Jones was active in the women's club movement and mentored a new generation of younger black leaders, such as Fannie Barrier Williams and Ida B. Wells. Historian Wanda A. Hendricks has described her as a wealthy "aristocratic matriarch, presiding over the [city's] black elite for two decades."

== Early life ==
Mary Jane Richardson was born in 1819 in Memphis, Tennessee, to a free black family; her parents were Elijah and Diza (Note: One source alternately gives her mother's name as Diaz.) Richardson. Her father was a blacksmith, and her mother was a homemaker. Richardson was one of the middle children among nine born to the Richardsons between 1810 and 1845. In their 1945 book They Seek A City, Arna Bontemps and Jack Conroy described Richardson as a light-skinned woman "whose queenly beauty became a legend in later years."

In the 1830s, Richardson moved with her family to the Mississippi River port of Alton, Illinois. As a teenager, she witnessed the riots in Alton surrounding the murder of Elijah Parish Lovejoy, an anti-slavery newspaperman. Lovejoy's funeral passed by Richardson's father's house, an event which she "vividly" remembered years later.

=== Marriage and move to Chicago ===
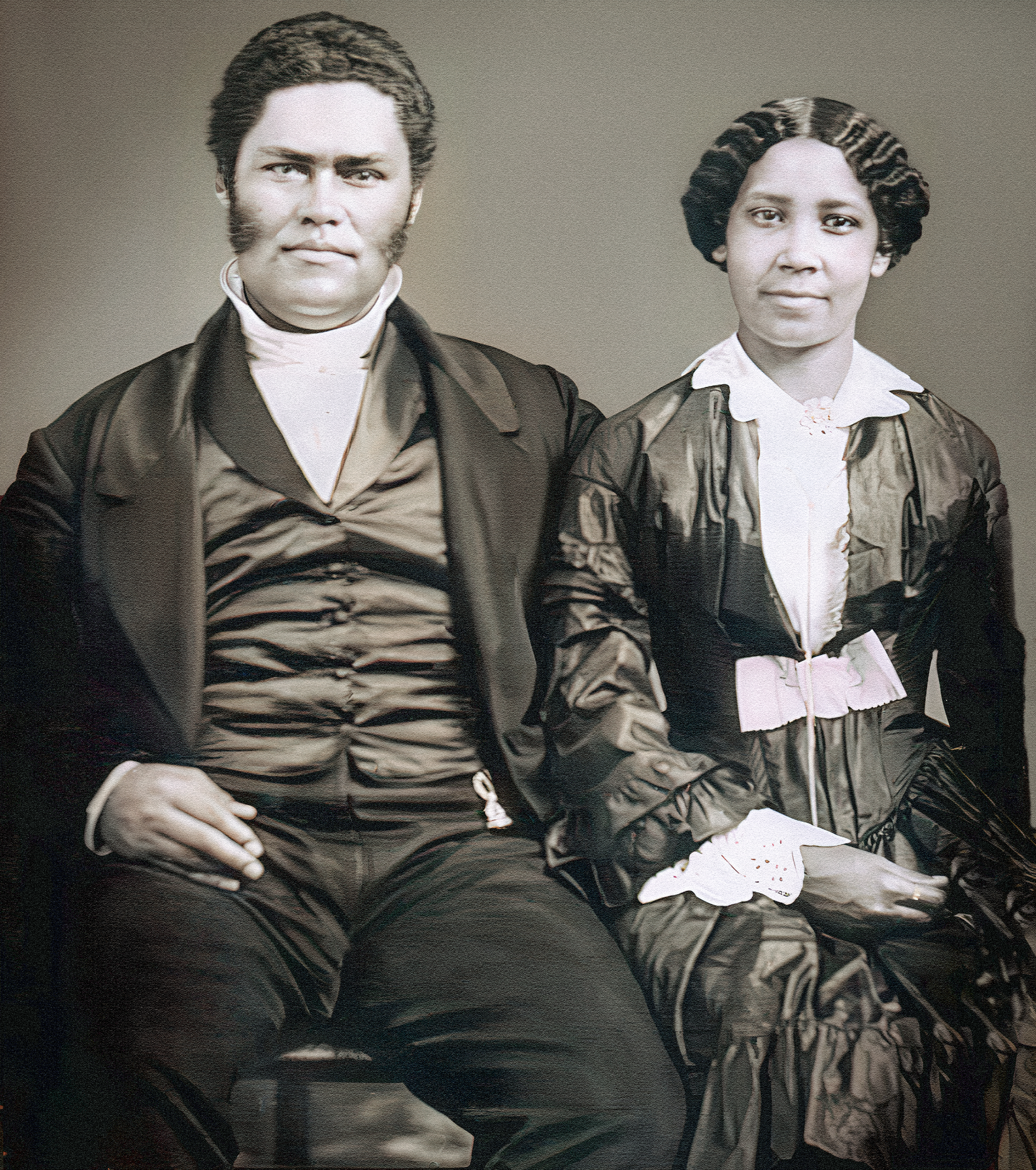
Mary Jane Richardson Jones with her husband John shortly after their marriage

In 1841, Richardson married John Jones, taking his surname. He was a free black man originally from North Carolina. Jones had first met him in Tennessee and he moved to Alton to woo her. Their daughter Lavinia was born in 1843. The couple, ever mindful that their status as free could be called into question, secured fresh copies of freedmen's papers before an Alton court on November 28, 1844. The young family moved to Chicago in March 1845, eight years after the city's incorporation. Committed abolitionists, they were drawn by Chicago's large anti-slavery movement. On the journey, they were suspected of being runaway slaves and detained, but were freed on the appeal of their stagecoach driver.

The couple arrived in the city with only $3.50 (equivalent to $120 in 2025), pawning a watch to afford rent and the purchase of two stoves. A black grocer, O. G. Hanson, gave the Joneses $2 in credit (equivalent to $70 in 2025). John Jones's tailoring business succeeded and by 1850, they were able to afford their own home. Although both were illiterate when they arrived in the city, they quickly taught themselves to read and write, viewing it as key to empowerment—John wrote that "reading makes a free man".

== Antebellum life in Chicago ==
The Joneses became members of a small community of African Americans in Chicago, comprising 140 people at the time of their arrival. Along with three other women, Jones became a leader in the African Methodist Episcopal church based at Quinn Chapel, and developed it into a well-trafficked stop on the Underground Railroad. The Joneses joined the Liberty Party and made their family home Chicago's second stop on the Underground Railroad.

While John's tailoring business prospered, Jones managed their home as a center of black activism, organizing resistance to the Black Codes and other restrictive laws like the Fugitive Slave Act. Their friends included prominent abolitionists such as Frederick Douglass, who introduced them to John Brown. Brown and his associates, described by Jones as "the roughest looking men I ever saw", stayed with the Joneses on their way east to their raid on Harpers Ferry. Jones provided new clothes for the radicals, including, as she recalled in an account given years later, the garb Brown was hanged in six months later. The Joneses were not militant, despite their anti-slavery views, and did not support Brown's plan for a violent slave uprising.

Together with her husband, Jones assisted hundreds of enslaved people fleeing north to Canada at a time when such actions were illegal, standing guard at the door during meetings of abolitionists. Writing in 1905, their daughter Lavinia Jones Lee recalled her mother personally loading fugitives onto trains north at the Galena and Chicago Union Railroad station on Sherman Street while slave catchers watched, kept away by a restless anti-slavery crowd. Jones kept track of those she had assisted, writing letters to many former fugitives and forming a network of aid centered on her and John.

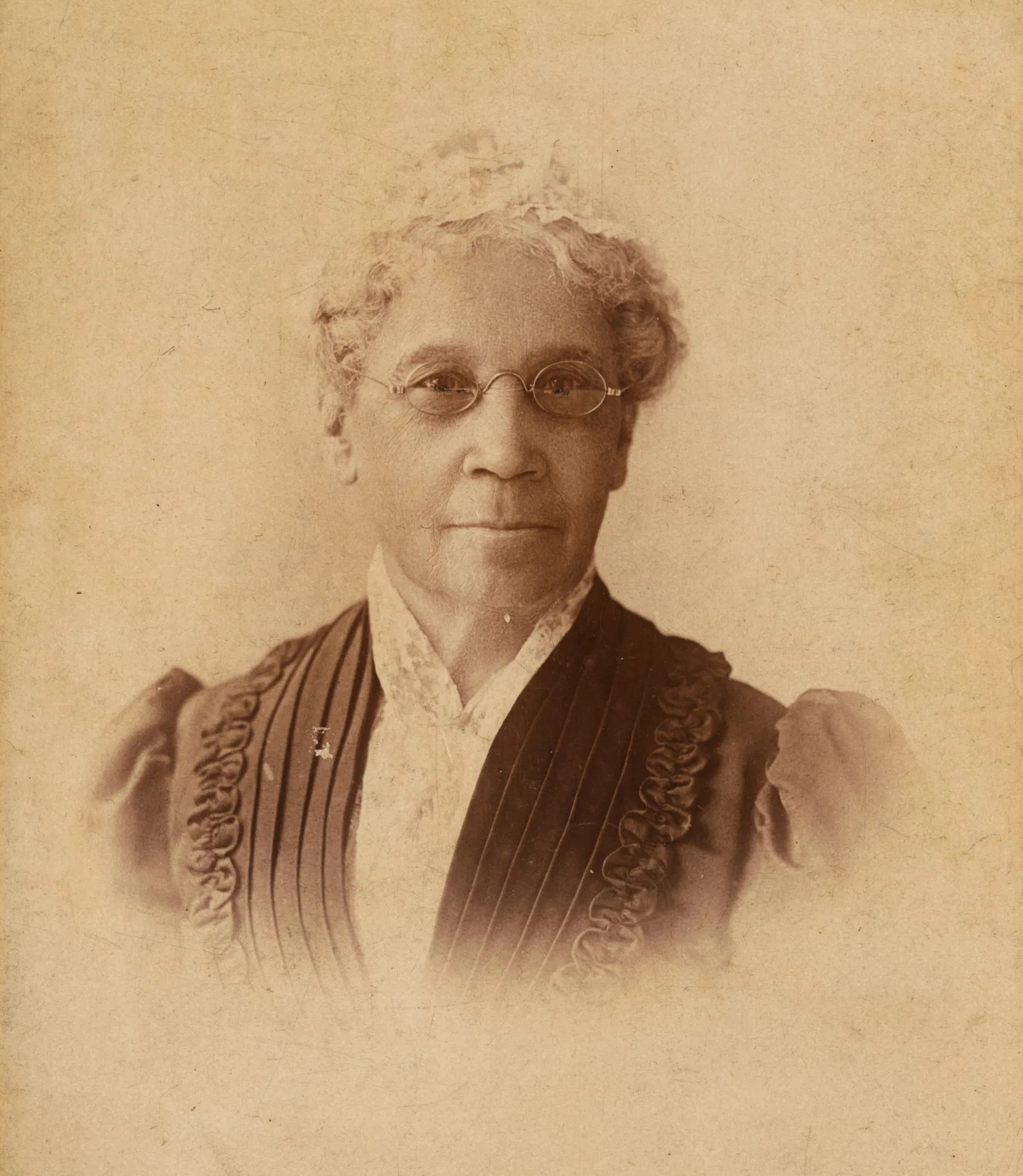
Cabinet photograph of Jones taken in 1883

In 1861, the Joneses helped found Olivet Baptist Church, which contained the first library open to black Chicagoans. Jones, along with three other women, established an aid group called Workers for the King through the church in 1871. During the Civil War in 1861, Jones recruited for the United States Colored Troops. Along with fellow activists like Sattira Douglas, she led the founding of the Chicago Colored Ladies Freeman's Aid Society, which allocated direct aid to former slaves as well as providing a forum for political action.

== Later life and continued activism ==
Jones, described by historian Richard Junger as a woman of strong "convictions and abilities", continued to advocate for integration and civil rights after the war ended. In 1867, Theodore Tilton, a New York journalist, planned a visit to Crosby's Opera House in Chicago to give a lecture. Jones wrote to warn him that the audience was to be segregated. Upset by this disclosure, Tilton successfully pressed the Opera House to integrate its seating for his talk and presented tickets to Jones, reading the letter she had written to him to the audience.

In 1871, John was elected as a Cook County Commissioner, the first African American to be elected to public office in Illinois. The same year, the Great Chicago Fire destroyed both the Jones family's home and John's four-story tailoring business, together valued at $85,000 (equivalent to $2.3 million in 2025). The family built a new house near Prairie Avenue, while John's tailoring business was also restarted at a new location; he continued to work until retiring in 1873.

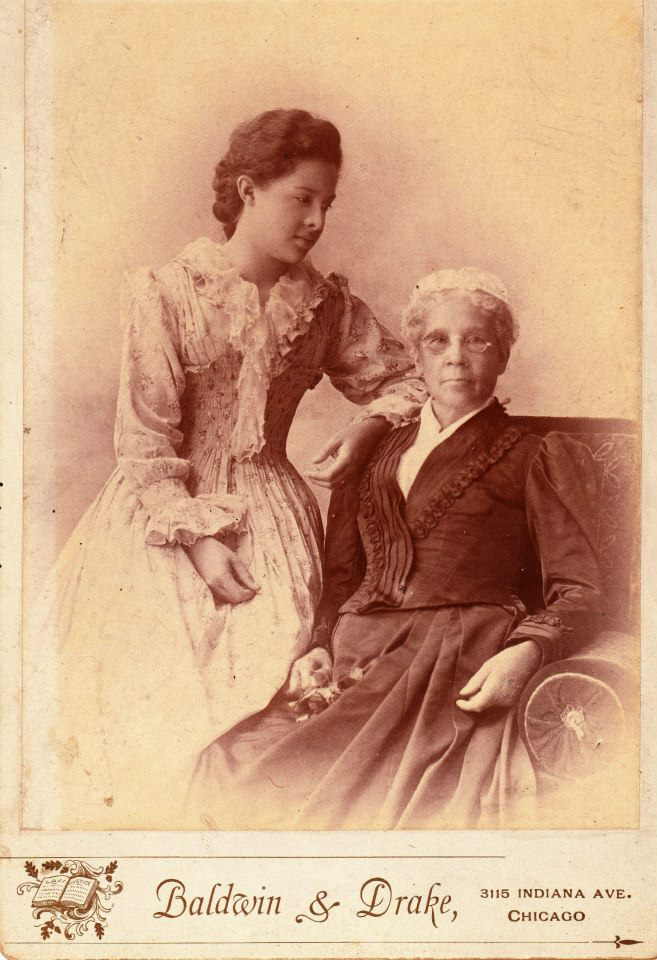
Jones with her granddaughter, Theodora Lee Purnell, in 1883

=== Widowhood ===
Following John's death from Bright's disease on May 27, 1879, Jones became independently wealthy. Her husband's estate was valued at over $70,000 (equivalent to approximately $2.4 million in 2025); he had been one of the city's richest men. John's tailoring business was taken over by Lloyd Garrison Wheeler, a family friend.

Moving to 29th Street, Jones's stately new home reflected her "economic status and social prominence" in the city, according to the historian Christopher Robert Reed; he adds that she was considered the center of black society in Chicago until the 1890s. Junger has written that Jones was considered the most prominent of the "old guard" African-American community that had arrived in the city before the Great Fire of 1871. Historian Wanda A. Hendricks has described her as a wealthy "aristocratic matriarch, presiding over the [city's] black elite for two decades."

=== Supporting younger activists ===
Jones dedicated her fortune to philanthropy and activism. She contributed significantly to Hull House and the Phillis Wheatley Club in Chicago. Her financial support enabled the founding of the Wheatley Home for Girls, which supported newly arrived migrants from rural areas, in 1908.

Jones was not quick to become a suffragist, arguing that prominent African-American women such as Edmonia Lewis had not pushed for suffrage, and saying that "her idea of woman suffrage" was that "a woman should do all she could do". Once she decided to support the cause of women's voting, Jones hosted Susan B. Anthony, Carrie Chapman Catt, and others at her home for meetings.

Jones also supported younger black Chicagoans like Daniel Hale Williams. She provided Hale Williams with lodgings at her home and funded his medical education in exchange for help with household tasks. When he established his own medical practice, Jones was one of his earliest patients. Later, in 1891, when he founded Provident Hospital as a non-segregated institution, she made a substantial philanthropic contribution.

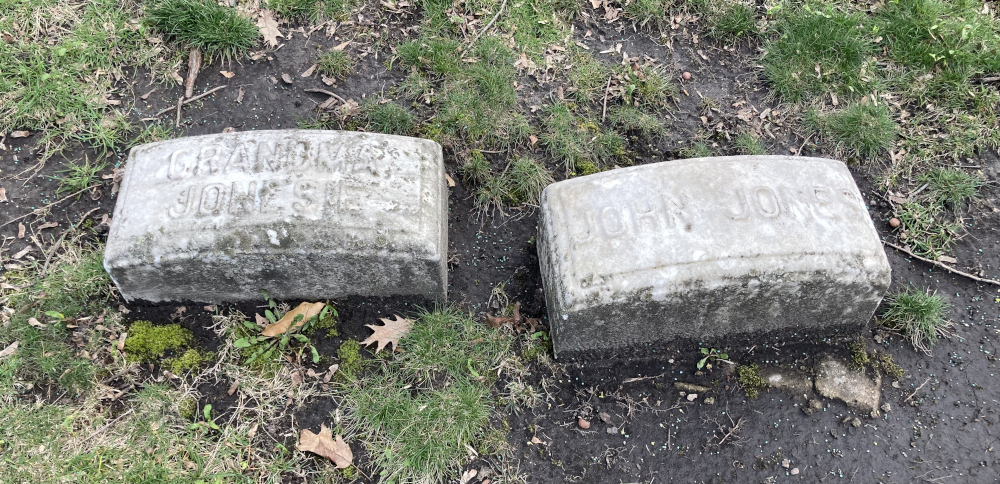
Jones and her husband are buried side by side in Graceland Cemetery

Emphasizing moral and social improvement, Jones told a Chicago Tribune reporter writing an 1888 story on "Cultured Negro Ladies" that "we want more justice to women and more virtue among men". Active in the women's club movement, Jones was the first chair of Ida B. Wells's new club in 1894, recruiting for the organization and lending it her prestige. Along with Fannie Barrier Williams, Jones ran the women's section of the Prudence Crandall Literary Club, a prominent forum for black activism and feminism in Chicago. She mentored a new generation of leaders among black women, including Barrier Williams, Wells, and Elizabeth Lindsay Davis.

Jones died on December 26, 1909, according to Junger. (Note: Another source gives her date of death as January 2, 1910.) At her death, The Chicago Defender reported that, "loved and admired by everyone," Jones had "reached the ripe age of 89 years with the full possession of all her faculties." She is buried alongside her husband at Chicago's Graceland Cemetery, under a tombstone which reads "Grandma Jonesie".

== Recognition ==
In 2004, the City of Chicago designated the site of the John and Mary Jones House as a Chicago Landmark. The Chicago Park District named a park in her honor in 2005; Jones Park is next to South Loop Elementary School and is bounded by 13th Street, Federal Street, and Plymouth Court.
