= John Jones (abolitionist) =

American tailor, politician, and activist (1816–1879)

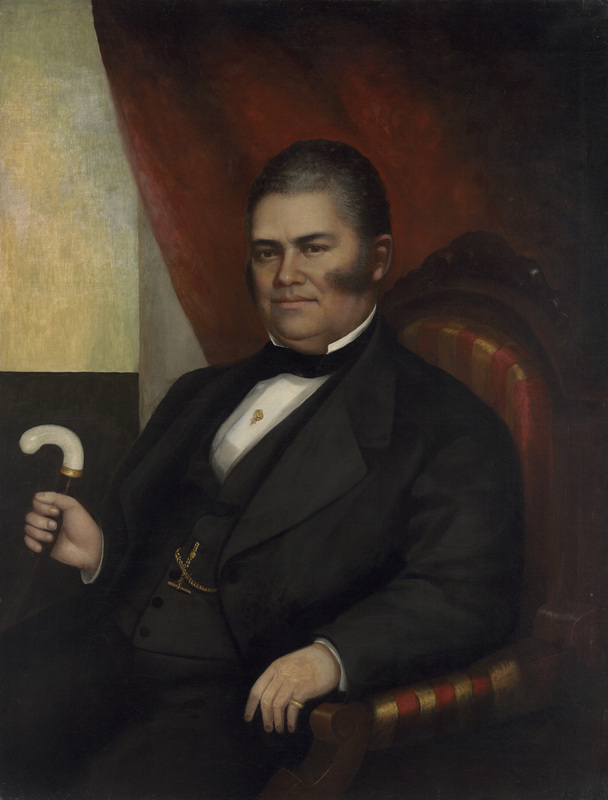
- John Jones c. 1865
- Born: 1816; North Carolina, US
- Died: May 27, 1879 (age 63–64); Chicago, Illinois, US
- Occupations: tailor, politician
- Political party: Republican
- Spouse: Mary Jane Richardson Jones
- Children: 1

Member of the Cook County Board of Commissioners
- In office 1871–1875
- Preceded by: board re-constituted
- Succeeded by: P. M. Cleary

John Jones (1816 – May 27, 1879) was an American abolitionist, businessman, civil rights leader, and philanthropist. He was born in North Carolina and later lived in Tennessee. Arriving in Chicago with three dollars in assets in 1845, Jones rose to become a leading African-American figure in the early history of Chicago.

In Chicago, Jones opened a tailoring shop. He led a campaign to end the Black Codes of Illinois and was the first African-American to win public office in the state. Jones became a notary public in 1869, was the first black man in the state of Illinois to serve on a grand jury in 1870, and the 1871 was elected to the Cook County Commission. He is believed to have been the first African–American to win public office in Illinois. He became one of Chicago's wealthiest men through his successful tailoring business.

Along with his wife, Mary Jane Richardson Jones, he was a dedicated abolitionist and philanthropist, turning their home into a stop on the Underground Railroad. The Jones' household was a center of abolitionist activity in the pre–Civil War era; the couple helped hundreds of people fleeing slavery. Jones died in 1879 of kidney failure.

== Early life ==
Jones was born in Green City, North Carolina, in 1816 to a free biracial mother and German-American father. For most of his early life, he was an indentured servant who trained as a tailor in Memphis, Tennessee. In 1841, Jones married a free black woman named Mary Jane Richardson (1819-1909), the daughter of Elijah and Diza Richardson.

Jones had first met her in Tennessee and he moved to Alton, Illinois to woo her. Their daughter Lavinia was born in 1843. The couple, ever mindful that their status as free could be called into question, secured fresh copies of freedmen's papers before an Alton court on November 28, 1844. The young family moved to Chicago in March 1845, eight years after the city's incorporation. Committed abolitionists, they were drawn by Chicago's large anti-slavery movement. On the journey, they were suspected of being runaway slaves and detained, but were freed on the appeal of their stagecoach driver.

== Arrival in Chicago ==
Jones and his wife arrived in the Chicago in 1845 with only $3.50 (equivalent to approximately $120 in 2025) to their name, pawning a watch to afford rent and the purchase of two stoves. A black grocer, O. G. Hanson, gave the Joneses $2 in credit (equivalent to approximately $70 in 2025). John Jones's tailoring business succeeded and by 1850, they were able to afford their own home, located at 119 Dearborn Street (609 South Dearborn under the city's modern street re-numbering). Although he lacked a formal education, and both he and his wife were illiterate when they arrived in the city, they both quickly learned to read and write, viewing it as key to empowerment—John wrote that "reading makes a free man". Jones was taught to read by Chicago publisher and abolitionist Zebina Eastman.

Jones' Certificate of Freedom issued to him by the state of Illinois in 1844 described him as 25-year-old, 5 ft 10 in (1.78 m) tall, mulatto, and a tailor by profession. It further noted that he had, "a scarr over the Left Eye Brown a Scratch across the cheek bone a scarr on the left Shin bone [sic]".

The 1851 Chicago Directory listed the Joneses tailoring shop and contained an advertisement for his services which read,

I take this method of informing you that I may be found at all business hours at my shop, ready and willing to do all work in my line you may think proper to favor me with, in the best possible manner. I have on hand all kinds of Trimings for reparing Gentlemen's Clothes. Bring your Clothes, Gents, and have them Cleaned and Repaired. Remember that all Clothes left with me are safe, because I am responsible, and permanently located at 119 Dearborn Street.

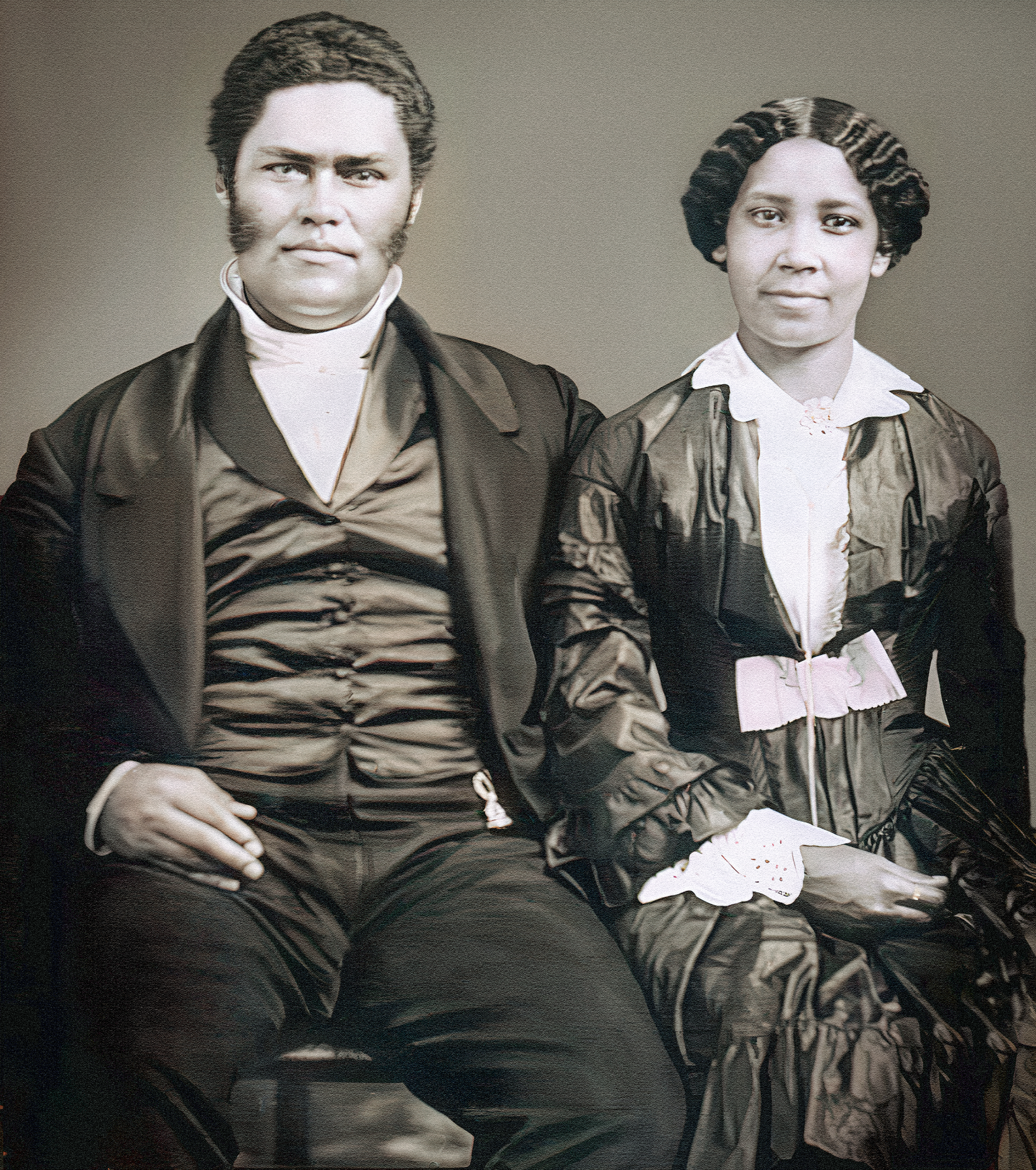
John and Mary Jane Jones in the 1840s

During his early years in Chicago, Jones became close with abolitionists Lemuel Covell Paine Freer and Dr. Charles V. Dyer. They were credited by Jones with teaching him to read and write along with the fundamentals of business and real estate. Beyond his tailoring business, Jones invested in land that would develop into the first working-class neighborhood for Chicago black families.

== Activism in Chicago ==
The Joneses became members of a small community of African-Americans in Chicago, comprising 140 people at the time of their arrival. The Joneses joined the Liberty Party and made their family home Chicago's second stop on the Underground Railroad. Jones was a leading campaigner for the rights of African Americans.

While his tailoring business prospered, his wife Mary managed their home as a center of black activism, organizing resistance to the Black Codes and other restrictive laws like the Fugitive Slave Act. At their home, the Jones hosted meetings with prominent abolitionists, with local and national figures of the abolitionist movement visiting the house. Among those who spoke at the house were Frederick Douglass and John Brown. The Joneses were friends with both men, with Douglass having introduced them to Brown. Brown stayed at their home several times, the final time being when Brown and his associates (described by Mary as "the roughest looking men I ever saw") stayed with them while traveling eastward en route for their raid on Harpers Ferry. The Joneses were not militant, and despite their anti-slavery views did not support Brown's plan for a violent slave uprising. Per a published account, Brown's main hint to them on that visit that he was about to do something significant was urging them to invest in cotton, sugar, and tobacco stock because Brown was about to "raise their price".

Jones authored several influential pamphlets in opposition to slavery. Brown advocated in strong opposition to a provision that was ultimately included in the 1848 state constitution that prohibited "free persons of color" from moving to Illinois, and prohibited slaveholders from bringing their slaves to Illinois to free them. In his opposition to this provision, Jones cited the principals of equal citizenship and equal treatment under the law, noting that the United States constitution did not utilize the word "white" in its text.

Jones played a key role in Chicago’s Underground Railroad and opened a "General Intelligence Office" at 88 Dearborn Street in 1854. This was the major communications hub for African-Americans, both free and escaped slaves, from 1854 until the end of the Civil War. In 1861, the Joneses helped found Olivet Baptist Church, which contained the first library open to black Chicagoans.

=== Illinois black codes ===
As early as 1847, Jones made it his primary objective to repeal Illinois' racist black laws. Illinois's version of a Black law or "code", first adopted in 1819, controlled (and in a 1853 law in the lead-up to the Civil War, forbade completely) black immigration into Illinois, and prohibited blacks from serving on juries or in the Illinois state militia. Jones' first attempt at repeal was writing a series of columns in the Western Citizen in 1847. It was also during this year that he began to work closely with his friend Frederick Douglass. In December 1850, Jones circulated a petition—signed by black residents of the state—for Illinois legislators to repeal the Black Laws. In 1864, the Chicago Tribune published Jones’ pamphlet, “The Black Laws of Illinois and a Few Reasons Why They Should Be Repealed.” The next year in 1865, Illinois repealed the state’s provision of its Black Laws, with governor Richard J. Oglesby signing the bill into law.

In 1869, after black people became eligible to hold Illinois state political offices, Governor Oglesby appointed Jones as the state's first black notary public. In September 1870, Jones became the first black man to serve on a grand jury in the state of Illinois.

=== Cook County Board of Commissioners ===
In 1871, Jones was elected as a Cook County Commissioner. He is believed to have been the first African-American to be elected to public office in Illinois. The month before the election, however, the Great Chicago Fire had destroyed both the Jones family home and their four-story tailoring business, together valued at $85,000 (equivalent to approximately $2,284,400 in 2025). The family was able to rebuild, building a new house near Prairie Avenue. Jones's tailoring business was also restarted at a new location; he continued to work until retiring in 1873. Jones won re-election to a three-year term on the county board in 1872, but lost re-election to a further term in 1875. He was a member of the Republican Party. While on the county board, he was involved in the enactment of a law abolishing school segregation in Cook County.

== Death ==
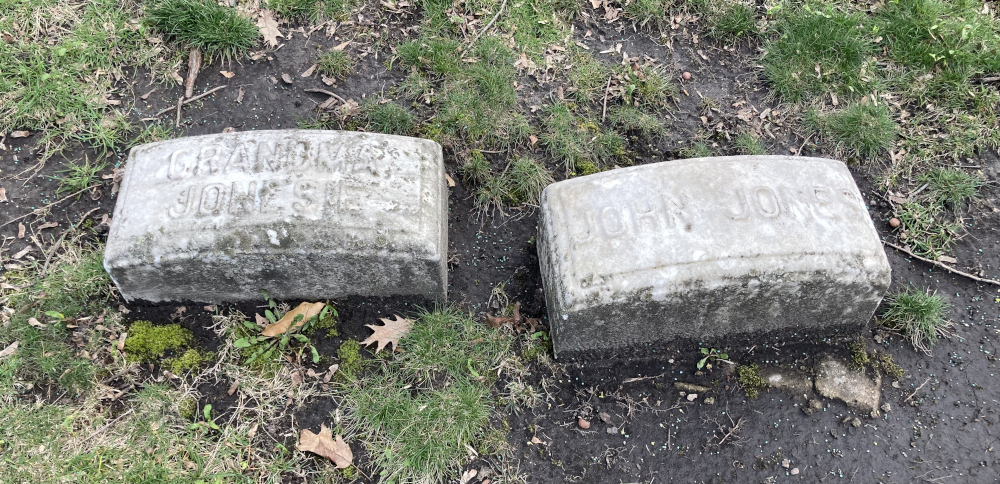
Jones and his wife are buried side by side in Graceland Cemetery

Jones died from Bright's disease on May 27, 1879; his wife, Mary, was the executor of his will and inherited his fortune. His estate was valued at over $70,000 (equivalent to approximately $2,418,700 in 2025); he had been one of the city's richest men, and by 1860 was one of the richest African Americans in the United States. John's tailoring business was taken over by Lloyd Garrison Wheeler, a family friend. Mary Jones remained prominent in Chicago until her death in 1909. The Joneses are buried side-by-side in Chicago's Graceland Cemetery.

== Legacy ==
In 2004, the City of Chicago designated the site of the John and Mary Jones House as a Chicago Landmark. The Chicago History Museum has a photograph of Jones, a painted portrait by Aaron E. Darling, and a painted portrait of his wife by the same artist.
