= Chicago Fire of 1874 =

American fire

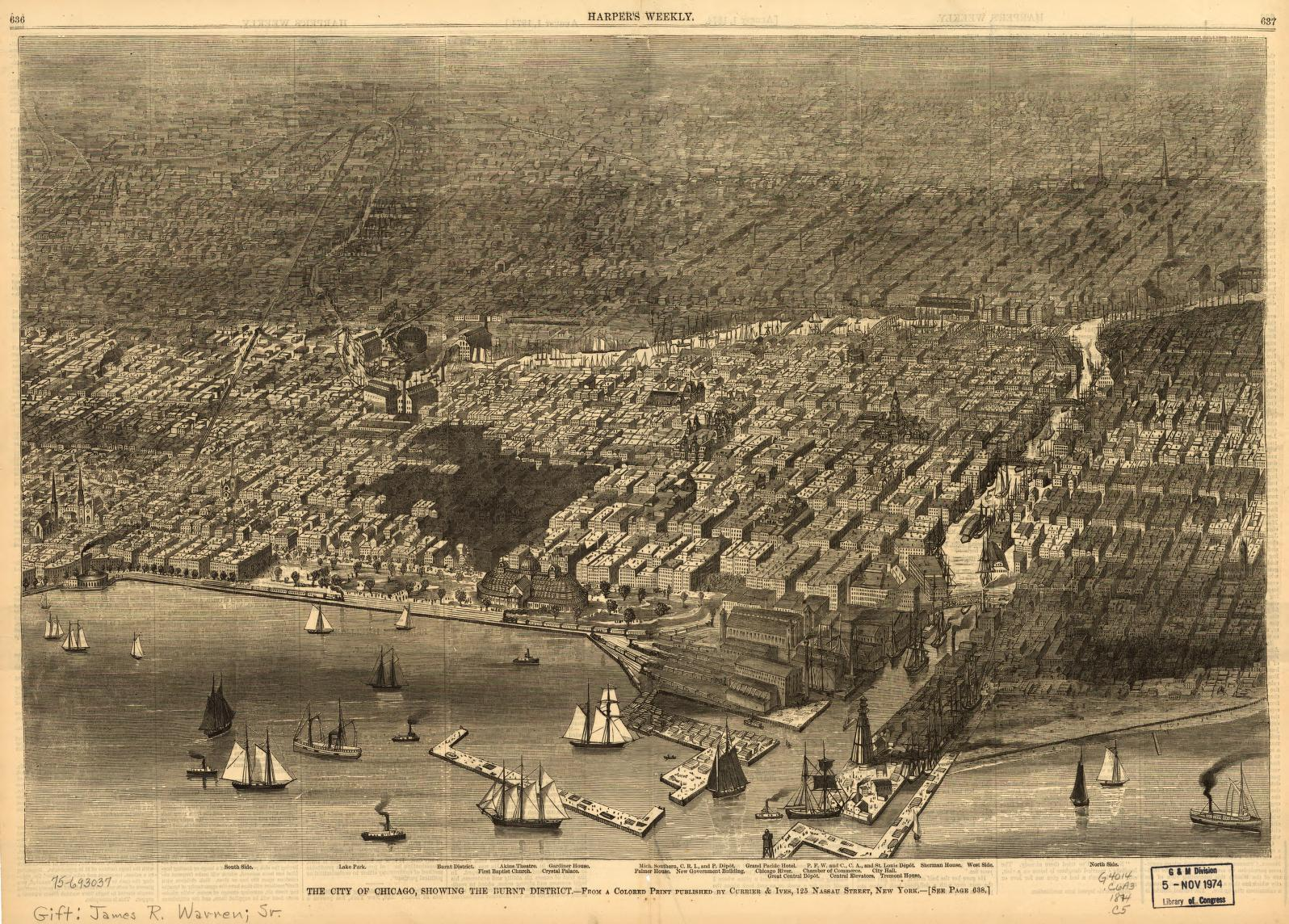
Bird's-eye map of Chicago highlighting the area specifically affected by the 1874 fire

The Chicago Fire of 1874 took place on July 14. Reports of the extent of the damage vary somewhat, but sources generally agree that the fire burned 47 acres (19 ha) just south of the Loop, destroyed 812 structures and killed 20 people. The affected neighborhood had been home to Chicago's community of Jewish immigrants from Russia and Poland, as well as to a significant population of middle-class African-American families; both ethnic groups were displaced in the aftermath of the fire to other neighborhoods on the city's West and South Sides.

The fire insurance industry's National Board of Underwriters responded to the fire by demanding widespread changes in Chicago's fire prevention and firefighting efforts. They ultimately encouraged fire insurers to cancel all coverage of buildings in the city in October. Many insurers did halt their activities in Chicago, and only returned to issuing policies in the city after the municipal government adopted many of the suggested reforms.

== Name ==
In the immediate aftermath of the fire, there were some attempts to give the event a nickname to correspond with the much larger "Great Chicago Fire" of 1871. On July 17, three days after the fire, the Chicago Tribune suggested calling "the recent event 'The Little Chicago Fire,' to distinguish it from 'The Big Chicago Fire' that took place three years ago." In a later memoir, a fire insurance executive from Chicago claimed that the event was "known as the 'little big fire.'" These nicknames never took permanent hold, however, and more recent publications refer to the event simply as "the fire of 1874" or "the second Chicago fire".

== Background ==
The 1871 fire spurred new fireproof regulations that prohibited wooden buildings to be constructed in the area bordered by 22nd Street to the south, the Chicago River to the north, Halsted Street to the west and Lake Michigan to the east. Wooden buildings already existing within those boundaries were grandfathered in and temporary wooden structures could be erected until replaced by permanent structures. City regulations mandated that those "temporary" buildings must come down within a year, but many remained.

July 14 was a hot day in the city, with a temperature above 90 °F (32 °C). The weather had been dry for weeks, with only one day recording more than a trace of rain since early June. It was these circumstances, along with a "strong prairie wind" blowing from the southwest, that made the 1874 fire similar to the 1871 fire.

The section burned in the 1874 fire was south of the Chicago core that was rebuilt after the 1871 fire. This area south of the Loop was considered undesirable by many, according to the Chicago Tribune: “This part of the city consists of the worst rookeries imaginable, most of which are occupied as houses of ill-fame.” The neighborhood was described as a "broad belt of wooden buildings which menaced the new structures which have sprung up in the business quarter of the South Division." Some of these buildings had been relocated to that part of the city from the South Division—the Tribune calls this relocation the act of "a weak Common Council and a weak Mayor", who endangered the city by packing these flammable wooden frame buildings too closely together upon relocation. Water mains in that part of the city were insufficient for fire-fighting purposes, being "mostly four inches in diameter and largely choked up with rust and corrosion so that one steam fire engine could not get a sufficient supply from a fire plug." The neighborhood, on the eve of the fire, was a densely packed tinderbox that, especially under the dry and windy conditions, was highly susceptible to becoming the site of a major conflagration.

== Origin ==
Although all accounts were clear in identifying the fire's origin a little before 4:30 p.m. in the neighborhood generally known as the "Cheyenne District", reports differ as to the exact location of the start of the fire. According to the report of the Fire Marshal, the fire began on Fourth Avenue (now Federal Street), and quickly spread to an oil works building near Clark Street and Fourth. The fire was further fueled by the ten to twelve barrels of oil in the alley near the oil works building.

The San Francisco Elevator published an article on August 8, 1874, identifying a Polish Jewish rag shop filled with flammable materials at 527 S. Clark as the source of the blaze. The shopkeeper was allegedly absent at the time of the fire's discovery, but a prostitute who was occupying the room west of the building discovered the fire and sounded the alarm at box 37 at 4:29 p.m.

In his three volume history of Chicago published in 1884, Alfred T. Andreas wrote that "on July 14, 1874, at 4:29 P. M., a fire of supposed incendiary origin was started in the two-story frame building, No. 449 South Clark Streets, owned by Le Grand Odell, and occupied as a saloon by E. T. Cregier."

In 2009, a Chicago-area librarian and online columnist, Alice Maggio, claimed in an article about the fire that it originated in a small barn "near the corner of Clark and 12th Street", similar to the debunked theory as to the start of the Chicago Fire of 1871. Maggio claimed that the barn was located next to the oil factory mentioned in the Fire Marshal's report. The exact cause of the fire was not clear, but area residents alleged that its owner, Nathan Isaacson, had set the fire intentionally. In the aftermath of the fire, Isaacson was arrested and charged with arson. Although some of his neighbors testified in court alleging to have witnessed him setting the fire, he was never convicted. Maggio suggests that these witnesses' statements were motivated more by racial prejudice than by any hard evidence.

== Course of the fire ==
According to the Tribune's article published the day following the fire, the fire began in "the centre of the block bounded by Twelfth, Taylor, and Clark streets, and Fourth avenue," a portion of the city the Tribune calls "the Cheyenne District." Due to a strong wind blowing from the southwest, the fire did not travel far south from its origin, halting before it reached Twelfth Street in that direction. Instead, the flames blew north and east, reaching the corner of Taylor and State Street by about 5:30 p.m. – by 6:00 p.m., the steeple of the German Methodist Church on the corner of Third and Polk caught fire. The fire crossed State Street at about 6:30 p.m., and was nearing Wabash Avenue at 7:00 p.m. when an alderman appealed to Police Superintendent Rehm to use gunpowder to blow up some buildings in the fire's path to act as a firebreak. Rehm refused, saying he was not authorized to take such an action, and the alderman appealed to Mayor Harvey Doolittle Colvin, also without success. Ultimately some attempts were made under the direction of Mark Sheridan, an alderman and one of the city's police commissioners, but sufficient quantities of gunpowder were too hard to acquire on such short notice, and the few wooden frame buildings that were demolished by these efforts did very little to slow the fire's progress.

The city's firefighters tried to hem the fire in on north and south, driving the flames east towards Lake Michigan in order to contain the damage they could do—in doing so, it seemed at the time that this strategy would ensure that the residences along the lake on Michigan Avenue would be lost, but ultimately the fire department was able to almost completely halt the blaze just short of that street. As the fire moved north along State Street, observers feared that the heart of the city's business district would be gutted again (as it was by the 1871 fire), but just north of the St. James Hotel and just south of Van Buren Street, a fire-proof wall was maintained that stopped the fire's progress just short of the Loop. The moment at which it was clear that the wall, called "the citadel of the conflagration" in one account, would mark the northernmost limit of the fire's destruction was characterized by one contemporary journalist as the turning point in the fire department's attempts to control the flames. The fire burned itself out around midnight, claiming the Michigan Avenue Hotel as the last major building destroyed by the flames.

== Extent of the damage ==
The fire occupied approximately 47 acres (19 ha), spanning south and westward from Van Buren Street and Michigan Avenue. The Associated Press report described the extent of the fire two days after the event: "The fire burned a small portion of Clark street, near 12th ... thence took 3rd and 4th avenues between Peck Court and 12th street, and burned them as far as Harrison street. State street was burned from Harmon Court to Van Buren street, Wabash avenue from 452, near the corner of Peck Court, to 267, near the corner of Van Buren street. Michigan avenue was burned from Harrison street to Van Buren, a short distance."

=== Structures involved ===
Prominent buildings destroyed in the fire include the First Baptist Church, the Great Adelphi theatre, the Jones School Building, Aiken's Theatre, the Michigan Avenue Hotel, Congress Hall, the Inter-Ocean Building, the St. James Hotel, and a post office which had formerly served as the Wabash Avenue Methodist Church. Among the religious communities that lost their places of worship were First Baptist Church, Olivet Baptist Church, Bethel Methodist Church, German Methodist Church, Kehelath B'nai Sholom Synagogue, and Kehilath Anshe Ma'arav Synagogue.

The Report of the Board of Police in the Fire Department to the Common Council lists 812 structures that were affected by the fire, their owners and occupants, and uses. The fire affected addresses between 449–533 Clark Street, 109–284 Fourth Avenue, 83–266 Third Avenue, 283–516 State Street, 267–475 Wabash Avenue, 49–53 Eldridge Court, 41–50 Hubbard Court, 6–52 Taylor Street, 6–26 Polk Street, 46–52 Van Buren Street, 198–230 Michigan Avenue, 12–20 Congress, and 17–98 Harrison. In the Report of the Board of Police issued immediately following the fire, there was no information included about the individual losses or insurance claims, but the total loss from the fire was estimated by them at the time to be $1,067,260, with insurance claims for $1,860,000. The report broke down the list of the 812 damaged buildings into categories, including:

- 619 frame buildings (one four-story frame, 21 three-story frame, 471 two-story frame, and 126 one-story frame structures)
- 190 brick buildings
- 3 stone buildings

And of those buildings affected, they comprised:

- 708 stores and dwellings
- 89 barns
- 8 churches
- 4 hotels
- 1 post office
- 1 school house
- 1 theater
- 1 Firehouse Engine Company 21 (Chicago) (First black Fire Company in Chicago. Burned down in the Fire, never rebuilt by the City)

== Press coverage ==
Newspaper coverage following the fire cast aspersion on the communities living in that part of the city, especially the neighborhood's Jewish residents: "They are the peddlars whose pack-ridden backs are humped and known in every land: whom children fear, and dogs bark at in the country, and who, in a trade, can out-jew all other jews. Last night they packed up with a unanimity quite unusual with even these natural-born wanderers, and, need it be said, unusually quick?" The Chicago Times noted that the fire had burned out a notorious red light district, describing the gathering of prostitutes fleeing the advance of the flames as "Hogarth's 'Gin Lane' with a touch of ... the 'Harlot's Progress'."

Some articles cast the fire in a religious context, describing the flames as a necessary consequence of the sinful activities associated with the near South Side, and even as a desirable outcome that would purge the city's worst elements: "Jews and Gentiles, whites and blacks, the virtuous and the depraved, lived in the neighborhood, and their haunts and homes have been swept out of existence. These worse than Ishmaels whom the world condemns have lost palace of sin and hovel of vice in a single hour. It was only thus the foul section could be purged and purified; but the work was not well done. Three or four blocks south and east and west should have been ingulfed in the common fate for the city's good. There must be another fire there before the city is fully purged."

One writer for the Chicago Tribune commented that the fire was less likely to deal lasting harm to African-Americans living in the area, as, in his opinion, the black community in that neighborhood was more financially stable with money saved in local bank accounts, at least as compared with other residents who had either wasted money on frivolous household possessions or were widely known to be itinerant wastrels.

== Immediate impact ==
Mathias Benner

Two days after the fire occurred, The Chicago Tribune published an article arguing that the lessons of the 1871 fire had not been learned, and calling for immediate reform regarding improved fire protection for the city.

The St. James Hotel decided to relocate from its previous address on Van Buren and State to the nearby corner of State and Washington. The First Baptist Church, though only recently constructed, decided not to rebuild in the neighborhood and instead to relocate further south. The Chicago Historical Society's library, which had been destroyed by the Great Fire of 1871, had been replenished by large donations of books from other historical societies around the nation and internationally, but this replacement collection was destroyed by the 1874 fire, necessitating a second effort to begin building the library's collections up. Overall, across the whole of the damaged area, "the losses sustained in the fire amounted to $3,845,000, with an insurance of $2,200,000."

The fire insurance industry responded aggressively to the 1874 fire; the National Board of Underwriters (based in New York City) insisted that the city immediately respond to a list of demands, including increasing the size of the water mains, reorganizing the fire department under the direction of a single powerful chief (as opposed to an elected board), and banning the erection of wooden buildings inside city limits. Until those demands were met, the Underwriters recommended that all fire insurers refuse to do business with any clients in Chicago, and most companies complied with the suggestion in order to pressure the city into action. In response, permanent fire limits were extended to the corporate limits of Chicago in an ordinance officially recommended to the council on July 20, 1874. New buildings could no longer be erected within the newly extended fire limits, unless a permit for the construction was obtained from the Board of Public Works. Wooden buildings that existed within the corporate limits of the city of Chicago could not be enlarged, raised, or repaired, except with the written permission of the Board of Public Works. Additionally, no wooden buildings could be removed from one lot to another within the corporate city limits, but wooden buildings could be transferred to areas that existed outside of the corporate city limits, provided that the building was worth more than 50% of what it would cost to erect a new building of "like character." The "character" of the building was to be determined by the Mayor and the Board of Public Works. The city was also forced to purchase additional equipment for the purposes of fire fighting.

Despite the speed of this response, Chicago's businesses and homes were still largely unable to secure fire insurance until a council was formed to make recommendations for reorganizing the fire department and revising the city's approach to fire prevention and response. This council, the Citizens' Association of Chicago, was formed in 1874 and soon implemented building inspection and surveying measures. It hired General Alexander Shaler, New York City's fire chief, to come and reorganize the city's fire department along military lines: the whole department was structured as a brigade composed of six battalions, each headed by an assistant fire marshal, and each battalion was divided into companies led by captains and lieutenants. The newly restructured department was led by the city's newly appointed fire chief, Matthias Benner. Most of the reforms demanded by the Underwriters were achieved by the fall of 1874, and the insurers resumed business in the city.

== Long-term impact ==
The Citizens' Association of Chicago continued to work on fire prevention and response in the city following its urgent work responding to the Underwriters in 1874. In 1876, the Association enforced other safety measures, such as requiring metal fire escapes in residential buildings more than three stories high. Smaller fires in the months that followed the 1874 blaze led to "the employment of three hundred special night watchmen, who went about the streets with red lanterns on the lookout for incendiaries and fires." Local businessmen organized themselves at this time to work for the election of aldermen who would prioritize fire safety and continue the work initiated by the ordinances passed in 1874: at least one fire insurer, Charles H. Case of the Royal Insurance Company, was elected as an alderman, and an institution known as the "Fire Insurance Patrol" was established to pursue continuing reforms.

In the aftermath of the fire, the minority groups who had lived in the "burnt district" generally relocated elsewhere in the city. The Jewish community affected by the fire, which was largely composed of immigrants from Russia and Poland, moved into neighborhoods west of the Chicago River, replacing second-generation immigrant Irish and German families who were moving farther away from the city center. The area they into which they moved became a "cradle of Jewish culture for the city" in the decades that followed. The fire is believed to have destroyed 85 percent of all African-American owned property in the city. Although roughly half of the displaced families relocated to mixed neighborhoods, most of the other families relocated to an area known as the Black Belt, which would become "the center of Chicago's black life for the twentieth century." This area contained most of the city’s African American population, and was also where African-American institutions were concentrated. The fire also displaced about 500 prostitutes from brothels and bordellos in the neighborhood. The "houses of ill-fame" quickly sprang up south of 18th Street, eventually becoming the infamous Levee. Wabash Avenue had been an upper-class area with its remaining churches and larger homes, but many of those residents and congregations moved south to Prairie Avenue.

== See also ==
- Great Chicago Fire
- Peshtigo Fire, on the same day as the Great fire, with much greater loss of life.
