= Provident Hospital of Cook County =

Coordinates: 41°48′09″N 87°36′49″W

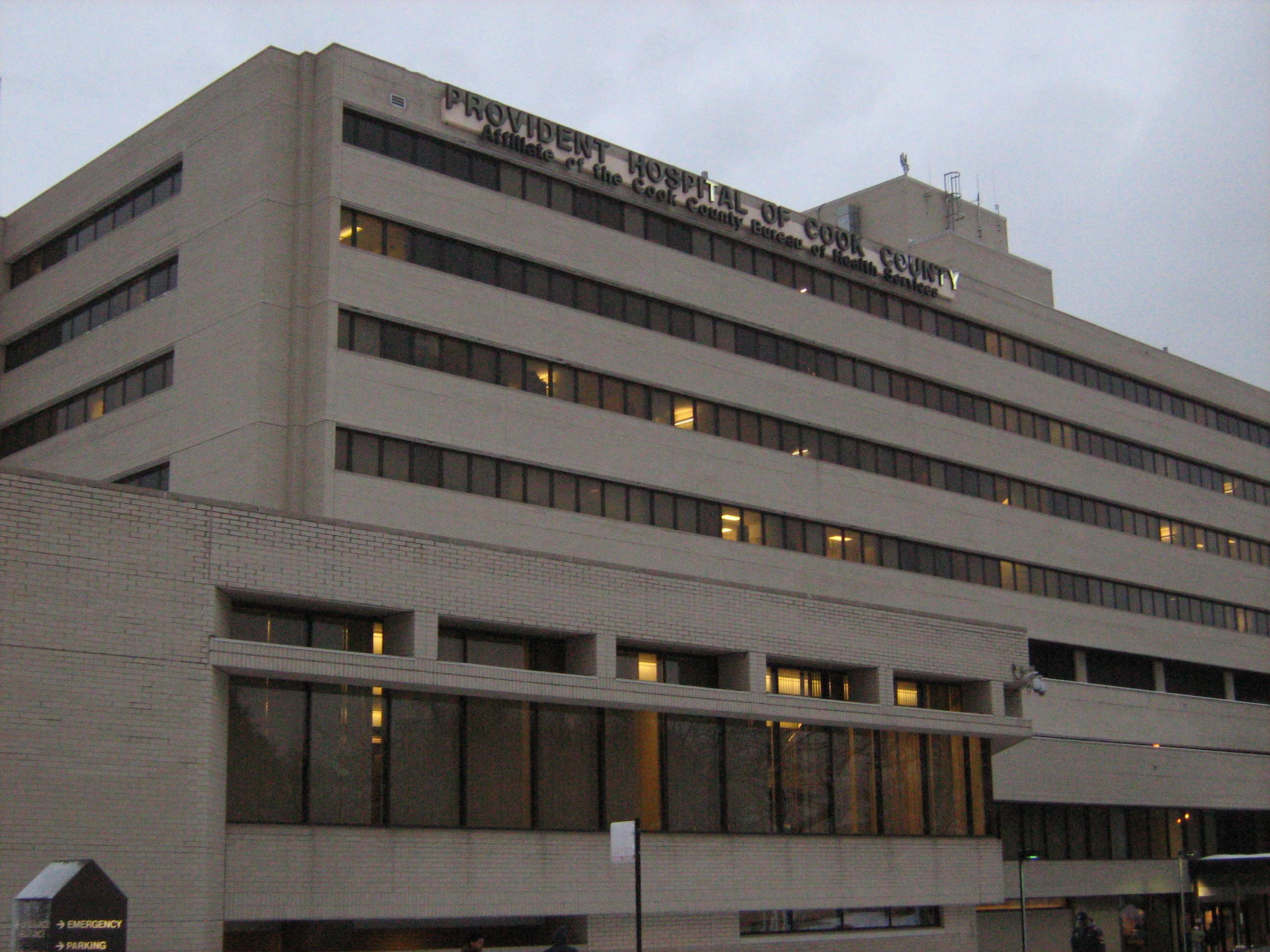

Geography
- Location: 550 E. 51st Street; Chicago, Illinois, United States

Organization
- Type: Community, Teaching
- Affiliated university: Loyola University Chicago Stritch School of Medicine and Midwestern University
- Network: Cook County Hospital System

History
- Founded: 1891 as Provident Hospital and Training School; Reopened in 1993 as Provident Hospital of Cook County
- Closed: 1987–1993

Links
- Website: www.cookcountyhealth.org/locations/provident-hospital-of-cook-county/
- Lists: Hospitals in Illinois

The Provident Hospital of Cook County is a Cook County-run public hospital located in Chicago, Illinois, United States. It was the first African-American-run hospital in the United States.

== History ==
Provident Hospital was founded in 1891 by Dr. Daniel Hale Williams after Emma Reynolds, a Chicago woman, was denied admission to Cook County School of Nursing because she was Black. Williams garnered financial support from Chicago’s Black community and White philanthropists, such as Philip Armour, Mary Jane Richardson Jones, T.B. Blackstone, and George Pullman, to open a twelve bed hospital on Chicago’s south side that would train Black nurses. The hospital in 1898 moved to a larger facility. The support of philanthropists mainly stemmed from the fact that it required a healthy workforce to sustain their businesses, but their Black employees were denied medical assistance at most medical facilities in the city.

The founding of the hospital was controversial as some leaders of the Black community, such as John George Jones, viewed its existence as a continuance of segregation in medicine. Despite the best attempts of Dr. Williams to maintain the integration of Provident’s medical staff and patient population, the hospital became a primarily Black institution by 1914. This push for Provident to become a Black medical hub was heavily endorsed by Provident’s medical director George Cleveland Hall, a young African American physician who replaced Dr. Williams, who believed in the principle of Black self agency. Williams resigned from his position on Provident’s board in 1913. His departure resulted in the loss of many White financial supporters of the hospital. This resulted in several financial struggles for Provident, however it still maintained its reputation as an esteemed African American-run hospital.

Provident Hospital successfully filled a much needed niche of educating and employing Black medical professionals. Initially, graduates of Provident’s nursing school struggled finding employment at other hospitals so Provident’s leadership created a visiting nursing service to employ their graduates. Additionally, Provident Hospital began offering graduate education for Black medical school graduates in 1917.

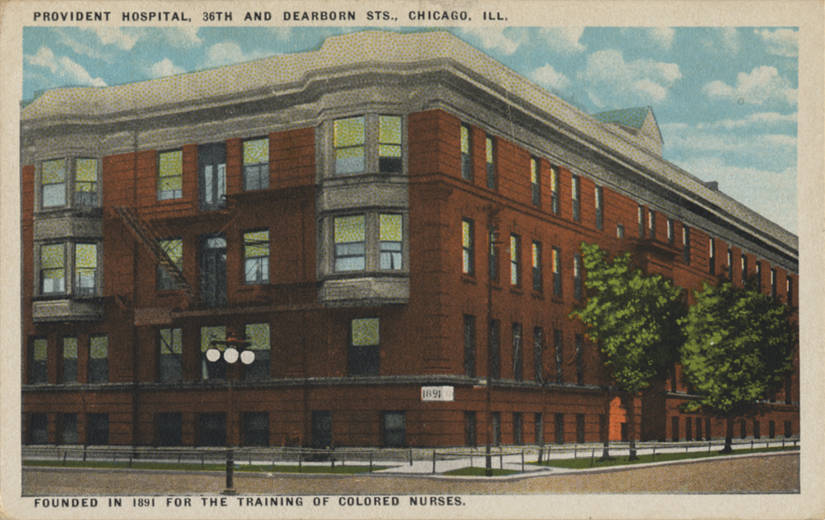
The original 12-bed Provident Hospital facility, which opened in 1891.

In 1928, leaders at Provident Hospital entered negotiations with officials at the University of Chicago to make Provident a teaching hospital for the university. The partnership was seen as an opportunity to improve the clinical, teaching, and research capabilities at Provident. For the university, affiliation was seen as a way to provide care to Black patients in Chicago without integrating their clinics or building a new wing of the existing Billings Hospital. Additionally, it gave a facility for the university to train their Black medical school graduates, who would not otherwise have had a place to complete their residency in the era of Jim Crow segregation. The affiliation officially began in 1930 with the financial backing of philanthropist Julius Rosenwald and the General Education Board, however these investors did not support full integration. The hospital moved again to a new facility in the former Chicago Lying-In Hospital in 1930.

Yet the affiliation project was riddled with numerous difficulties. Mismanagement of finances by the hospital board and the Great Depression resulted in a massive accrual of debt by the hospital. Additionally, the project faced major backlash in the Black community as the black autonomy of the hospital was taken away by university leadership. In 1931 N.J. Blackwood, a White physician, took the position of medical director of Provident Hospital. Throughout the mid 1930s, Black community groups throughout Chicago and the US, such as the National Medical Association, the Chicago Defender, and the NAACP, raised concerns about the affiliation project as the university’s attempt to use an institution meant to serve the Black community to perpetuate medical segregation. By 1939, talks of dissolving the affiliation contract began and in 1944 the University of Chicago officially cut ties with Provident Hospital.

Despite the many difficulties faced in the 1930s, Provident did continue to grow in recognition as “the finest Negro voluntary hospital” in the US noted for caring for thousands of patients yearly and providing intense medical training. In 1938 it was the only fully accredited hospital in the US to provide graduate medical training to Black physicians.

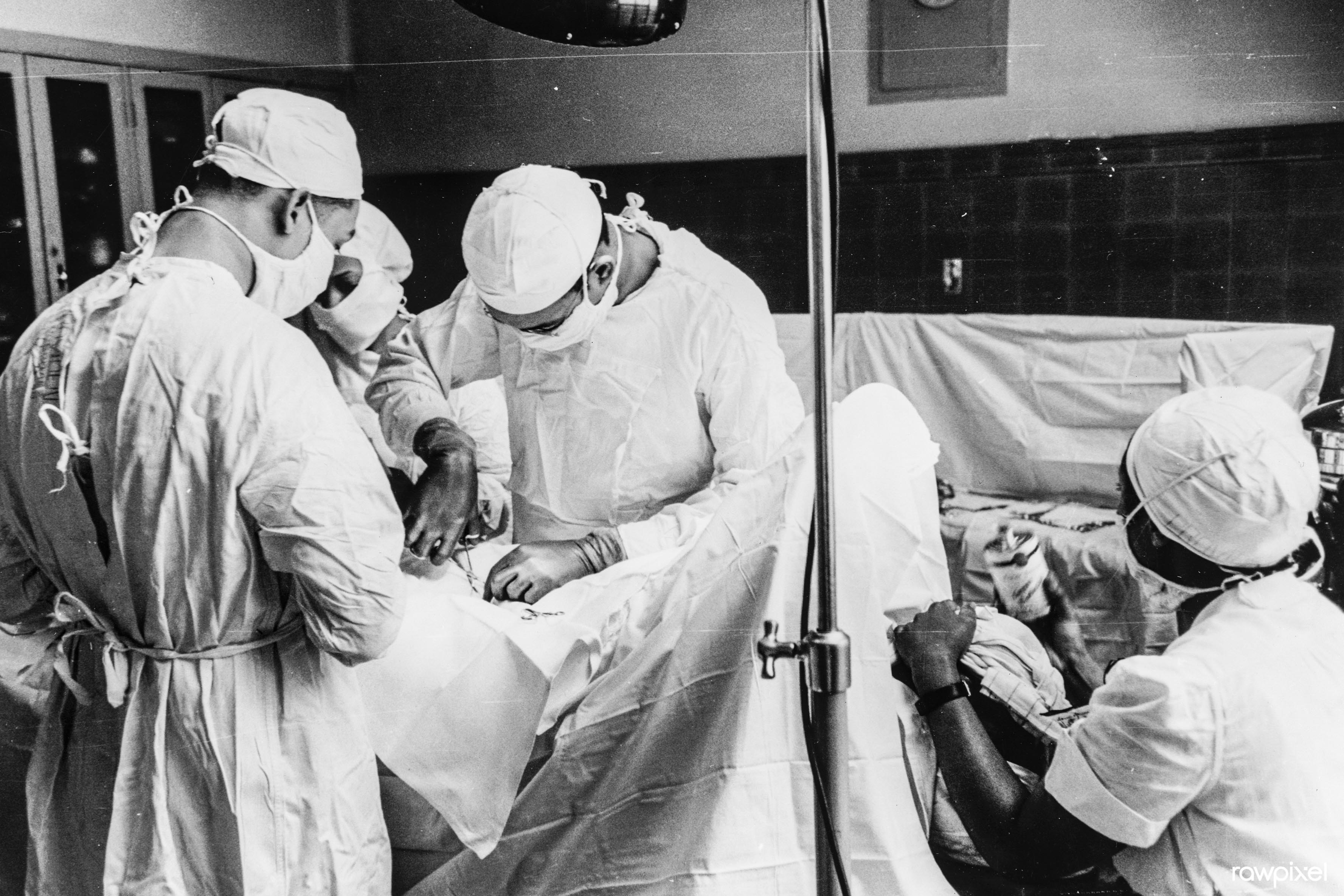
Surgical operation at Provident Hospital.

Provident Hospital continued operations in the wake of its ended affiliation with the University of Chicago. In 1964, the passage of the Civil Rights Act saw the ending of segregation within hospitals. This would have unintended negative consequences for Provident as its patient population could now get care at other institutions in Chicago. The hospital saw a large loss in patients and revenue, but continued operations through the 1960s and 1970s despite the financial difficulties. The hospital was in dire need of a facilities upgrade, but lacked the funds to do so. With the help of grants from two federal agencies, Provident was able to open a new facility in 1982, but the continued strain from large debts resulted in the closure of Provident Hospital in 1987.

== Today ==
Provident Hospital was purchased by Cook County in 1991, and it reopened in August 1993 after the county invested several million dollars in renovations. Part of the reopening success can be attributed to a campaign led by Chicago Defender publisher John Sengstacke. In 1994 Provident partnered with Loyola Stritch School of Medicine, and the hospital became a teaching facility for the university. While no longer being a Black-run institution, Provident Hospital continues to serve the communities of Chicago’s South Side by providing comprehensive health services across both inpatient and outpatient medical specialties and being a site for community-based medical education.

In 2019, Cook County released the plans for a $240 million building upgrade to Provident Hospital, increasing the scale of outpatient facilities and expanding its provided services to better serve community residents. However, the plan was pushed back three times due to the removal of the Cook County CEO in 2020, the COVID-19 pandemic in 2021, and budget problems in 2022. Currently, the rebuilding project is on an indefinite pause, but Cook County officials have expressed hope to move forward in the future. Today, Provident Hospital continues to run operations in its Bronzeville facility.
