= Engine Company 21 (Chicago) =

First all-black fire company in the Chicago Fire Department

Coordinates: 41.8322222°N 87.6177778°W

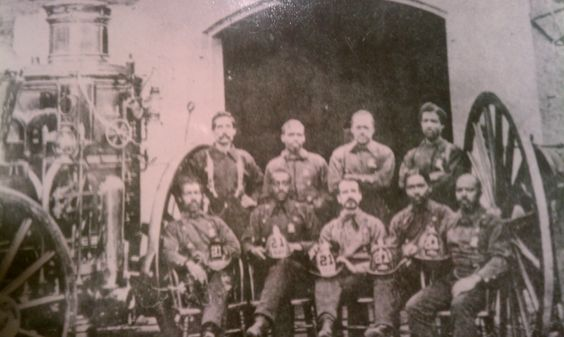
Engine Company 21 in 1873

Engine Company 21, organized in 1872, was the first all-black fire company in the Chicago Fire Department. The fire pole was invented by members of the company in 1878, and after inventing it, Engine 21 had the fastest response time in the city.

== History ==
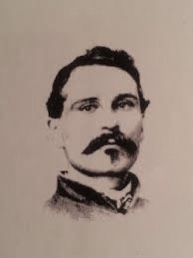
Captain David B. Kenyon

According to a November 1872 article in the Chicago Daily Tribune announcing the purchase of three new steam pumpers, which would allow for the creation of three new fire stations, "of course it is conceded on all sides that one of the companies will be composed of colored men, but it is not definitely known whether it will be commanded by a Caucasian". An announcement the next month that the company would be located on May Street was accompanied by a warning that "any infringement upon the rights of the members by the people in the vicinity will be punished by the removal of the engine."

The company was organized in 1872 under the captainship of David B. Kenyon, who was in the position until 1875. Kenyon later died in the line of duty. By 1875 the company was located at 313 Third Avenue.

In 1888 David Kenyon's brother, Joseph L. Kenyon, was captain. At the time he was the only White member of the company. Other members of the company at the time included Steve Paine and Marshall Ward, drivers, both of whom grew up enslaved, Paine in Kentucky and Ward in Tennessee. The rest of the company were younger men and included Lieutenant Anthony Makers, engineer William Watkins, and pipemen James E. Porter, Richard L. Caesar, Charles Scott, and James H. Jackson.

By 1893 the company was located at 13 Taylor Street. As of 1900 the captain was Jeremiah Herlihy. In 1901, because of results of a civil service examination, several White test takers were told to turn down an appointment to Engine Company 21 until the highest-scoring Black test taker was offered a position as a pipeman.

== Invention of the fireman's pole ==
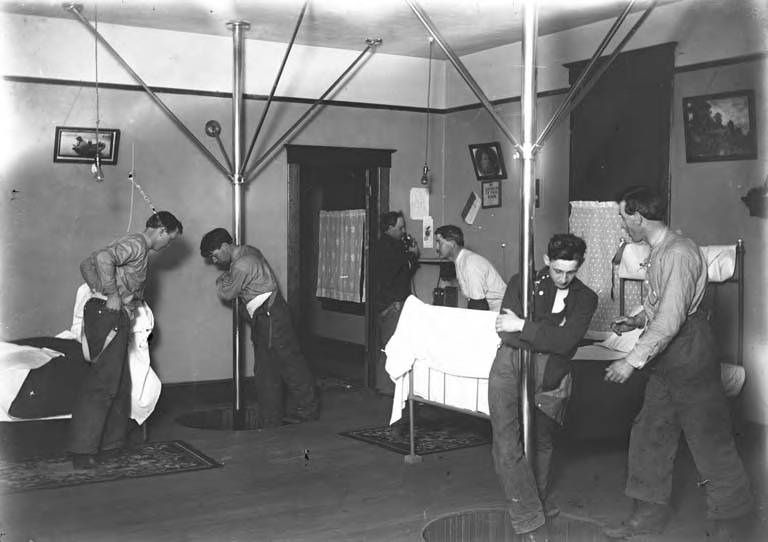
Firefighters at the Seattle Fire Department pose for a photograph

In the 1870s, firefighter George Reid was on the third floor with Kenyon, where the two were stacking hay; Reid reacted to an alarm by sliding from the third floor to the first floor down the pole that had been temporarily lashed in place to allow for hoisting hay bales. Reid reached the ground before those on the second floor who were using the spiral staircase, which at the time were used in firehouses to keep the horses from climbing upstairs. The next week Kenyon convinced his superiors to allow him to install a permanent pole from the second-floor sleeping quarters. He received permission to cut a hole in the floor but was told that if the experiment did not work, the team would have to pay for the repairs. After the installation of the pole, other firefighters thought the idea was "crazy" until Engine Company 21 developed "a reputation for being faster to get to the scene than other companies" and the fire pole soon came into common use across the country.

== Performance ==
When on duty at the 1885 Chicago Lumber Company Fire, the seventeenth company called after the fires had leapt the Chicago River, as reported by the Chicago Tribune, spectators "made fun of the colored firemen when they dragged their hose in ... but the levity was soon succeeded by admiration. Their steamer is a powerful one, and the pipemen evidently do not mind heat."

According to an 1888 Chicago Tribune article, at the time no other engine company in the city had a better record of responding to fires. In drills the full team could go from men upstairs and horses in stalls to a fully-hitched and mounted rig in 11 seconds; the team's typical time in practice was 14 or 15 seconds in daytime, 25 or 26 at night, according to the 1888 Tribune article. According to Dekalb Walcott, the company "recorded at the top of Chicago's list for responding to the most working fires, run time, and overall responses."

According to the 1894 Fire Marshall's report, the company responded to 474 alarms, travelled 744 miles (1,197 km), performed duty at 148 fires, worked 184 hours, and discovered 7 fires in 1893.

In 1900 the company won an award for fastest work.
