= Richard DeWall =

American surgeon (1926–2016)

- DeWall and bubble oxygenator heart-lung machine, Nov. 1956.
- Born: 16 December 1926; Appleton, Minnesota, U.S.
- Died: 15 August 2016 (aged 89); Dayton, Ohio U.S.
- Known for: Developing the bubble oxygenator
- Medical career
- Profession: cardiothoracic surgery

Richard A. DeWall (1926–2016), was an American cardiothoracic surgeon who in 1955 created the first workable, portable bubble oxygenator that removed bubbles, thus avoiding gas embolism during cardiopulmonary bypass. Later, he wrote the original plans for what became the Wright State University School of Medicine.

== Early life and education ==
Richard Alison DeWall was born on 16 December 1926 to Grace Gardner and Herman Harvey DeWall in Appleton, Minnesota. After serving in the U.S. Navy until October 1945, he graduated from the University of Minnesota in 1949 and subsequently gained his MD in 1953.

== Career ==
John Gibbon had invented the heart-lung bypass machine and performed the first repair of the heart from the inside of the heart, using extracorporal perfusion in 1953. In 1955, John W. Kirklin, who was a surgeon also researching heart-lung machines, was successful in using Gibbon’s modified heart-lung machine via a pump-oxygenator. Soon C. Walton Lillehei, who worked nearby, abandoned his technique of cross-circulation via a parent as a method of diverting blood through an external circuit. Gaining experience of the heart-lung machine while taking care of the procedure during anaesthetists breaks and challenged by Lillehei to find a solution to the undesired bubbles, DeWall became interested in the problems connected with oxygenating blood and in 1955, developed the first bubble oxygenator that removed bubbles, thus avoiding gas embolism. Silicon antifoam and Mayon polyethylene tubing were two important components of this Lillehei-DeWall bubble oxygenator. 350 open-heart operations were performed at the University of Minnesota within the following two years.

DeWall founded the first open heart surgery programme at Kettering Hospital and later became the director of the general surgery residency-training programme there, which he established.

== Death and legacy ==
DeWall died at his home in Dayton, Ohio on 15 August 2016.

In 2018 he was posthumously inducted into the Dayton Region's Walk of Fame. A replica of his first oxygenator is on display at the National Museum of American History at the Smithsonian Institution.

== Selected publications ==
- "Cardiovascular Inventiveness Within the University of Minnesota Department of Surgery", The Annals of Thoracic Medicine (June 2005), Vol. 79, Issue 6, pp. 2214–2216, doi:10.1016/j.athoracsur.2005.03.030
- "Origins of open heart surgery at the University of Minnesota 1951 to 1956", The Journal of Thoracic and Cardiovascular Surgery (August 2011), Vol. 142, Issue 2, pp. 267–269, doi:10.1016/j.jtcvs.2011.04.021
- "The Evolution of the Helical Reservoir Pump-Oxygenator System at the University of Minnesota", The Annals of Thoracic Medicine. The Society of Thoracic Surgeons. (2003). doi:10.1016/j.athoracsur.2003.09.007
