= Bubble oxygenator =

A bubble oxygenator is an early implementation of the oxygenator used for cardiopulmonary bypass. It has since been supplanted by the membrane oxygenator as a result of advances in material science. Some continue to promote it as a low-cost alternative allowing greater self-sufficiency.

== History ==
Open-heart surgery developed rapidly beginning in the 1950s, and many methods were developed for oxygenating blood outside the body. A bubble oxygenator was introduced in 1950 by Clark, Gollan, and Gupta. The method faced initial skepticism but in 1956 the University of Minnesota's De-Wall-Lillehei bubble oxygenator was demonstrated to be relatively simple, inexpensive, and easy to operate.

The device faced competition from membrane oxygenators, which arrived within the same decade and were found to provide better oxygenation for periods over eight hours, and other advantages beyond six hours. However, most open-heart operations were substantially shorter, and by 1976 the bubble oxygenator was predominant.

In the 1980s, microporous membrane oxygenators were developed, and replaced bubble oxygenators in most applications.
