= Retrograde autologous priming =

Retrograde autologous priming (RAP)
- Duration: Cardiac surgery (with CPB)
- Types: Blood conservation technique
- Causes: Hemodilution

Retrograde autologous priming (RAP) is a means to effectively and safely restrict the hemodilution caused by the direct homologous blood transfusion and reduce the blood transfusion requirements during cardiac surgery. It is also generally considered a blood conservation method used in most patients during the cardiopulmonary bypass (CPB). The processing of RAP includes three main steps, and the entire procedure of RAP (about 1L CPB prime volume) could be completed within 5 to 8 minutes. This technique is proposed by Panico in 1960 for the first time and restated by Rosengart in 1998 to eliminate or reduce the risk of hemodilution during CPB. Moreover, to precisely determine the clinical efficacy of RAP, many related studies were conducted. Most results of researches indicate that RAP is available to provide some benefits to reducing the requirements for red blood cell transfusion. However, there are still some studies showing a failure of RAP to limit the hemodilution after the open heart operation.

== Background ==
Cardiopulmonary bypass machine

=== Cardiopulmonary bypass (CPB) ===
The requirement of blood transfusion during open-heart surgical operations is almost inevitable because the metabolism must be continuously kept working through the peripheral blood flow. Cardiopulmonary bypass (CPB) is a medical technique to oxygenate the blood and remove the carbon dioxide during the cardiac operation. It can be seen as a "pump" to serve as a heart-lung machine whose function is sustaining blood circulatory and transporting oxygen to red blood cells before blood is flowing backwards the arterial circulation. It can also be considered a kind of extracorporeal circulation.

=== Homologous blood transfusion ===
There are two primary methods, homologous blood transfusion and autologous blood transfusion, to reduce the massive blood loss resulted from different surgeries. Homologous blood transfusion refers to using blood from other compatible donors to improve the oxygen-carrying capacity for blood by raising the number and concentration of blood red cells. Autologous transfusion uses patients' own blood which is stored previously. Compared to autologous blood transfusion, the homologous blood transfusion has more side effects, such as postoperative Infection, immunosuppression and viral transmission. These adverse effects facilitate the development of approaches to conserve the blood during cardiac surgery. These methods contain preoperative autologous blood donation (PABD), acute normovolemic hemodilution (ANH) and cell salvage. There are two main ways to salvage red blood cells. Cell processing and direct injection. Cell processors are red cell washing devices like the Cell Saver that collect anticoagulated shed or recovered blood, wash and separate the red blood cells (RBC) by centrifugation. Filtration devices like HemoClear microfilter, constitute the second major type of blood salvage in operating rooms. In general, ultrafiltration devices filter the patient's anticoagulated whole blood. Direct transfusion is a blood salvaging method associated with cardiopulmonary bypass (CPB) circuits or other extracorporeal circuits (ECC) that are used in surgery such as coronary artery bypass grafts (CABG), valve replacement, or surgical repair of the great vessels. Following bypass surgery, the ECC circuit contains a significant volume of diluted whole blood that can be harvested in transfer bags and re-infused into patients.

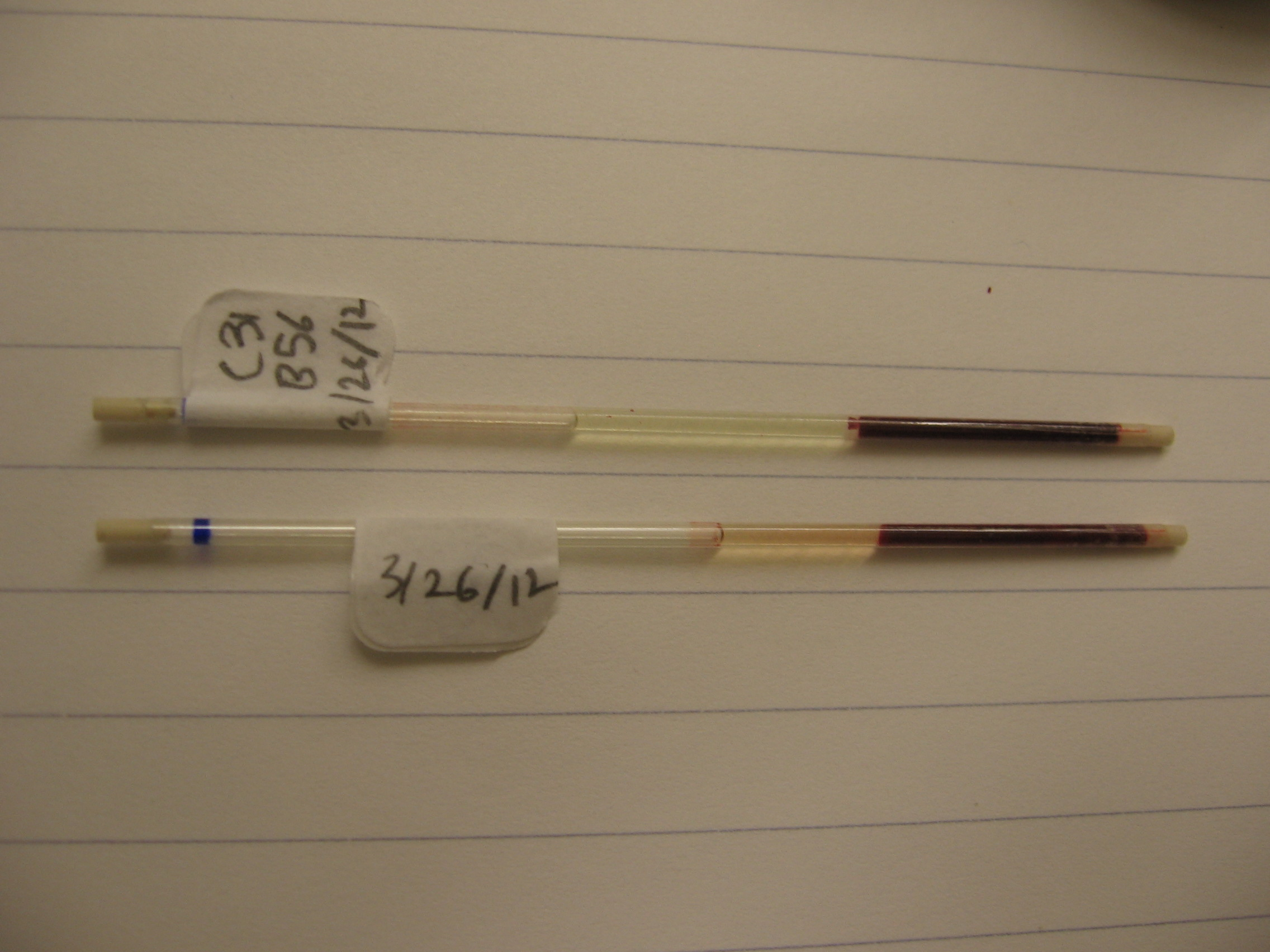
Hematocrit

Furthermore, the number of patients requiring red blood transfusions could be anticipated by observing a variety of variables before cardiac surgery. The red cell mass, as a critical factor, it matches the assumption that the blood transfusion is commonly demanded by patients who have a low red cell mass during CPB. At the same time, these patients are more likely to have low hematocrit values. Patients expect to reduce the blood product used during surgery because the red blood transfusion generally has a negative physiologic impact and highly related cost. Especially when CPB is applied in surgical operations, there will be a large number of blood transfusions required due to blood loss and hemodilution.

=== Hemodilution ===
Furthermore, a significant risk caused by the homologous blood transfusion in open-heart surgeries is hemodilution. The hemodilution is the primary hematologic interference which results in coagulopathy and decreased capability of carrying oxygen in the blood. The root cause of this situation is the decreased blood concentration and viscosity in the body. During the cardiopulmonary bypass, blood is mixed directly through the homologous blood transfusion, but homologous blood may be not compatible, acceptable or available. Thus, there is a high incidence of distinct degrees of hemodilution with CPB.

== Medical principles ==
RAP is a blood conservation technique to decrease the priming volume of cardiopulmonary bypass and then reduce the level of the hemodilution. To be more specific, some cardiopulmonary bypass circuit prime are replaced by autologous circulating blood at the beginning of bypass in both venous cannula and arterial cannula. The final objective of RAP is reducing the number of patients requiring blood transfusion during CPB.

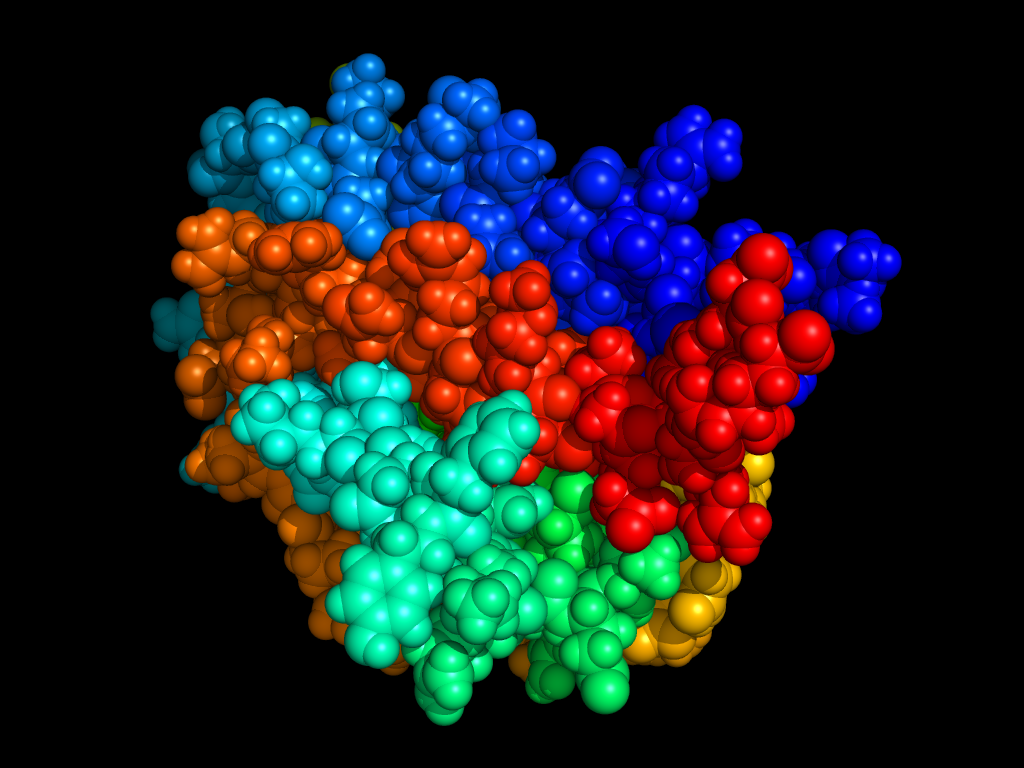
Erythropoietin

There is a type of glycoprotein growth factor - erythropoietin that can be used to mitigate the hemodilution by increasing the total number of red blood cells. Compared with erythropoietin, RAP is more rapid and inexpensive. Because RAP aims to directly influence the CPB prime volume instead of red cell masses, but for patients who have extremely low red cell masses, like anaemic patients and some particular groups, such as women and elderly, they would have greatly decreased hematocrit values and need a larger amount of blood transfusions. As a consequence, these patients are thought to be more suitable to use erythropoietin rather than RAP.

== Method of RAP ==
The specific procedure of RAP was firstly described by Rosengart and DeBois to restrict the hemodilution during CPB. When arterial cannulae and venous cannulae are prepared, the crystalloid prime (approximately 1L) is drained into a re-circulation bag. Before the beginning of the CPB, the crystalloid priming fluid is displaced by the autologous blood. There are three key steps for RAP to have a role to play. The first step is that crystalloid is flowing from the arterial line into the transfer bag. And then autologous blood flows through the arterial line and filter after the placement of arterial cannulae. The second step is crystalloid prime in the venous reservoir and oxygenator is replaced by blood through pressure gradients. Lastly, the remaining crystalloid priming fluid is collected and displaced from the venous line into the CPB bag on the onset of CPB. In each step, about 300ml CPB crystalloid prime volume is replaced by blood into the transfer bag. The entire process could be commonly finished within 5 to 8 minutes.

== Risk of RAP ==
Although RAP is an effective and safe technique to reduce the hemodilution during CPB, there are still some potential risks of RAP.

=== Blood viscosity ===
The first risk is related to blood viscosity. The blood viscosity refers to the resistance to the movement of blood. It is vital to sustaining the vascular homeostasis in disease prevention and medical treatment. Besides, the blood viscosity is greatly influenced by distinct factors, such as haematocrit, the degree of aggregation of the blood red cells and temperature. Some researchers support the inverse relationship between temperature and blood viscosity. They calculated that the blood viscosity increased by two percent for each degree of the temperature drop. And then it would bring in hematologic concentration and increased hematocrit. During CPB, blood viscosity can rise 10% to 30% at low temperature. Thus, an appropriate degree of hemodilution is considered to be helpful to reduce the increased blood viscosity and the adverse effect of microcirculation. Furthermore, this kind of degree of hemodilution is often given by an entire crystalloid prime. When some crystalloid prime is replaced by RAP during CPB, the blood viscosity may increase and then generate a negative impact on patients undergoing cardiac surgery.

=== Hemodynamic instability ===
The second potential risk is about hemodynamic instability. The hemodynamic instability could be defined as the perfusion failure, which gives rise to unstable blood pressure. It is characterized by some clinical features, such as circulatory shock and advanced heart failure. When RAP is used, the large amount of crystalloid prime is extracted, and then the withdrawal theoretically results in the hemodynamic instability. The hemodynamic instability is a treatable condition if phenylephrine and crystalloid administration could be applied. However, the therapeutic effectiveness of RAP reduces because of the crystalloid administration to some extent. If hemodynamic instability cannot be eliminated throughout the treatment, RAP must be stopped.

== History of use ==
- In 1998, a study was investigated to identify if RAP can reduce the hemodilution and red blood cell transfusion requirements. Sixty participants were randomized into two groups with or without retrograde autologous priming. All participants were precisely matched with preoperative variables, and hematocrit value was controlled at a minimum interval. Finally, the percentage of participants requiring the blood transfusion in two groups (RAP and control) during CPB is 27% and 53%. This result demonstrated that RPA is an efficient medical technique to safely decrease the level of hemodilution and requirements of blood transfusion.
- In 2003, a research was made to determine the effect of decreased blood dilution and blood transfusions using RAP. Twenty participants having elective coronary artery bypass grafting (CAPG) were randomly allocated into two groups which are either standard prime (SP) volume or RAP. Crystalloid fluid balance, extravascular lung water (EVLW), body weight and plasma colloid osmotic pressure (COP) were observed and evaluated. The eventual result of this small-scale pilot experiment indicated that RAP declined the amount of EVLW and weight gain.
- In 2006, an investigation was designed to evaluate the adverse effects of RAP after open-heart surgery. Five hundred and fifty-nine participants undergoing CPB took part in it and were prospectively randomized into two groups with RAP or without RAP. Researchers followed participants for up to two years and no adverse outcome is subsequently observed. Additionally, there are considerably less postoperative cardiac arrest for the RAP group than the control group. This unexpected finding might show that RAP is beneficial to the recovery of patients after the cardiac operation.
- In 2009, a study was implemented to determine the efficacy of RAP on decreasing blood transfusion requirements in small adults. The difference from previous studies is that the cohort of this research is limited to small adults. One hundred and twenty participants with a body surface area (<1.5m^{2}) having the first time open heart surgical operation were randomly allocated into two groups (standard prime or RAP). The final result indicated that blood transfusion is essential for 83.3% of participants in the standard prime group. In contrast, 26.7% of participants in the RAP group needed to receive red blood cell transfusion. The finding supported that RAP significantly contributed to the reduction of hemodilution, and it could be applied for small adults with a body surface area (<1.5m^{2}).
- In 2011, a retrospective cohort study was conducted at a university hospital to examine the efficacy of RAP on cerebral oxygenation. Forty-eight participants undergoing CPB received RAP during the operation and forty-six participants were selected as a control group with the traditional technique. The regional cerebral oxygen saturation (rSO2) was observed during and after cardiac surgery. The value of rSO2 in the RAP group is higher than the control group during the operation, but the final data of these two groups is same. Consequently, the RAP during CPB not only decreases the risk of the hemodilution but also improves the cerebral oxygenation. The result of this study provides the possibility that RAP is potentially beneficial to the development of psychotherapy.

== Failure of RAP ==
In 2004, a retrospective cohort research was designed to test the clinical effectiveness of RAP during CPB. Two hundred and fifty-seven participants were allocated into the experimental group which used RAP as a routine medical technique to conserve blood. In the meantime, two hundred and eighty-eight participants were grouped without RAP. The period for this research is twenty-four months. A significantly small reduction of requirements for blood transfusion is founded in the RAP group, and no difference is observed between two groups for the number of packed red cell blood units. This result supports that RAP is failing to provide benefits to the blood protection during cardiac surgery. However, in a subsequent 2006 study by the same authors, it was found that RAP patients had improved post-operative outcomes and significantly fewer post-operative cardiac arrests.

== Other blood conservation techniques ==
A multimodal method might be beneficial to conserving crucial organ perfusion and decreasing requirements of blood transfusions. Moreover, approaches which are objective to restrict intraoperative fluid balance positiveness may also contribute to reduced blood transfusions because positive intravenous fluid balance plays a critical role in limiting hemodilution during open-heart operations.

=== Plasma concentration filters ===
Plasma concentration filters are functional to remove extra fluid at the onset of CPB. Hemoconcentration can be defined as the increased concentration of blood cells that results from the decreased plasma volume. Hemoconcentration may lead to some potential complications, such as embolism, infection and haemolysis. To avoid the lack of circulating volume, the additional CPB is usually used during hemofiltration. However, the additional CPB may mitigate the effect of hemofiltration, and the efficacy of hemofiltration on blood transfusion is not significantly clear. So the ultrafiltration cannot be verified as a useful blood conservation technique to reverse hemodilution and maintain blood balance.

=== Autologous blood cell salvage ===
Autologous blood cell salvage is a therapeutic approach to recover the blood during cardiac surgery. Today, it is also widely used in many other high risk of surgeries around the world. Some reports suggest that if autologous blood cell salvage is routinely used in open heart surgeries, the requirements for blood transfusions can be effectively reduced. Moreover, the Society of Thoracic Surgeons and the Society of Cardiovascular Anesthesiologists guidelines argued that the routine use of intraoperative blood salvage is beneficial to blood conservation during CPB. However, it is not available to patients who have infection or malignancy.
