= John W. Kirklin =

American physician

- Born: John Webster Kirklin; April 5, 1917; Muncie, Indiana, U.S.
- Died: April 21, 2004 (aged 87); Birmingham, Alabama, U.S.
- Education: University of Minnesota; Harvard Medical School
- Occupation: Cardiothoracic surgeon
- Known for: Refining the heart-lung bypass machine; Surgeon Assistant (SA) Training Programme; Computerized intensive care unit monitoring
- Relatives: Byrl R. Kirklin (Father); James Kirklin (Son)
- Medical career
- Profession: Surgeon
- Institutions: Mayo Clinic; University of Alabama School of Medicine
- Sub-specialties: Open heart surgery
- Notable works: Co-author of Cardiac Surgery

John Webster Kirklin (April 5, 1917 – April 21, 2004) was an American cardiothoracic surgeon, general surgeon, prolific author and medical educator who is best remembered for refining John Gibbon's heart–lung bypass machine via a pump-oxygenator to make feasible under direct vision, routine open-heart surgery and repairs of some congenital heart defects. The success of these operations was combined with his other advances, including teamwork and developments in establishing the correct diagnosis before surgery and progress in computerized intensive care unit monitoring after open heart surgery.

After completing his undergraduate education at the University of Minnesota, Kirklin gained admission to Harvard Medical School from where he graduated in 1942. He was a neurosurgeon during the Second World War, but later, after being appointed to the Mayo Clinic in 1950, specialised in the surgical treatment of congenital heart disease. From 1964 he led the surgical departments at the Mayo Clinic and from 1966 until retirement, held the same position at the University of Alabama School of Medicine (UAB). He performed the world's first successful series of open heart operations using the heart-lung machine. The Board of Governors at the Mayo Clinic approved the first eight operations, of whom four (50%) survived.

Kirklin had the idea of training surgeon assistants as a new type of physician's assistant and started the UAB's Surgeon Assistant (SA) Training Programme in 1967. He was also the editor of The Journal of Thoracic and Cardiovascular Surgery and received a number of honorary degrees from universities around the world. He was president of the American Association for Thoracic Surgery in 1978.

== Early life and education ==
John Kirklin was born in Muncie, Indiana, in the United States, on April 5, 1917. His parents were Byrl Raymond Kirklin, a radiologist, and Gladys Marie Webster Kirklin. He had one sister, Mary W. Kirklin. At the age of eight, he moved with his family to Minnesota, where his father became the first director of radiology at the Mayo Clinic. Subsequently, he completed his undergraduate education at the University of Minnesota in 1938 after which, in 1942, he graduated from Harvard Medical School. He then carried out his internship at the University Hospital of Pennsylvania and finished his residency at the Mayo Clinic.

== Second World War ==
In 1944, Kirklin began service with the United States Army with the rank of captain and undertook neurosurgical training at O'Reilly General Hospital in Missouri. He served as an army neurosurgeon until he was discharged in 1946.

== Mayo Clinic ==
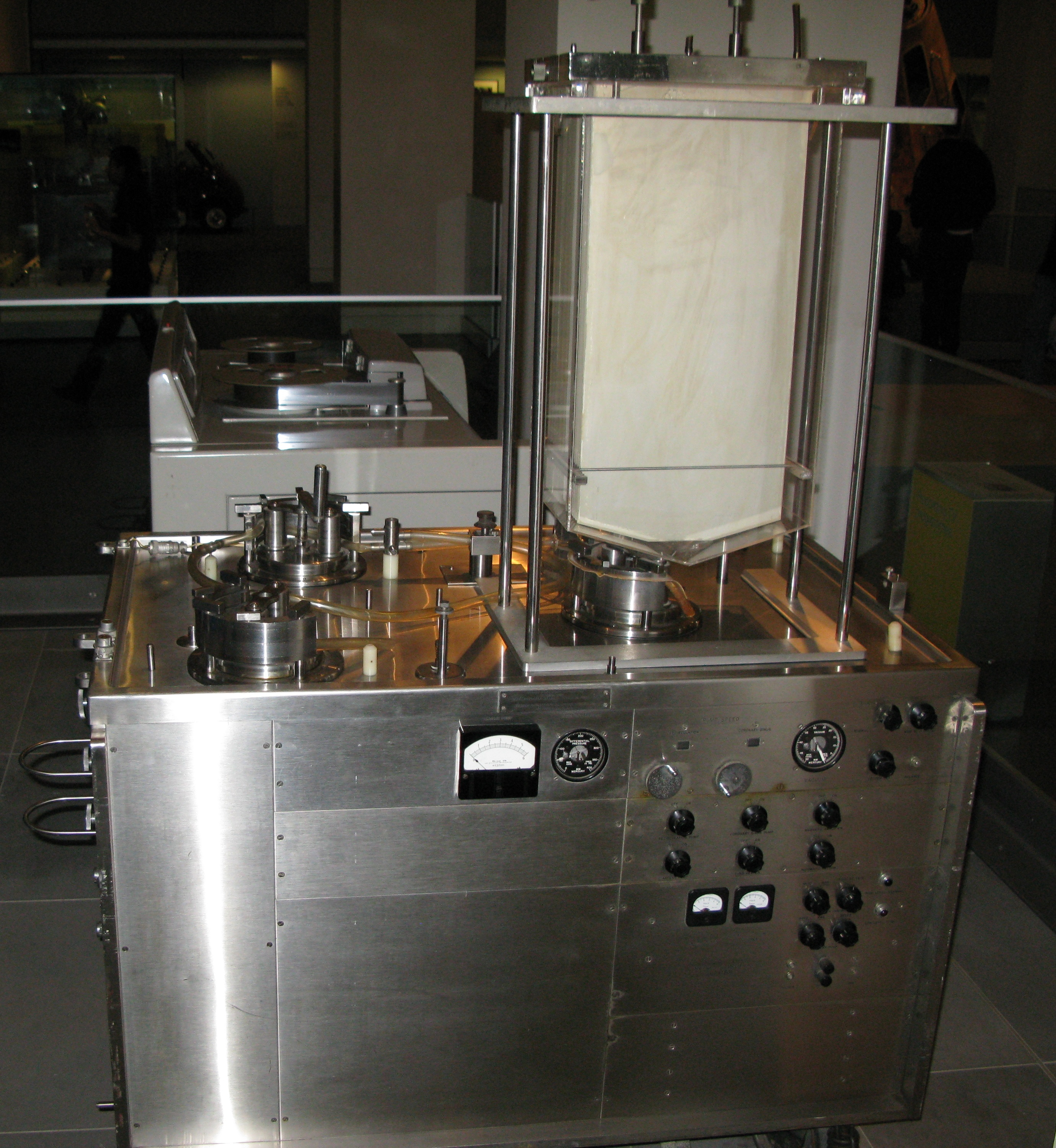
1955 heart lung machine

Kirklin's interest in neurosurgery changed to heart surgery and congenital heart disease under Robert Gross at the Boston Children's Hospital. In 1950, he was appointed to the Mayo Clinic in Rochester, Minnesota. He later recalled writing notes "about how we would fix the inside of a heart if we could get there. We couldn't, of course, but being young, you dream!".

In 1952, F. John Lewis, at the University of Minnesota, used deep hypothermic circulatory arrest to visualize and directly close an atrial septal defect (ASD) in a five-year-old girl. In the same year, Kirklin formed a team of specialists including a cardiologist, a physiologist and an engineer to advance a cardiac surgical programme for the clinical application of a mechanical pump-oxygenator. Kirklin acquired John Gibbon's pump-oxygenator blueprint after evaluating other devices. Gibbon had successfully closed an ASD in an 18-year-old woman on 6 May 1953, with use of his machine, the only successful procedure using the pump-oxygenator machine before Kirklin's work.

Kirklin refined the heart-lung machine (screen type) originally developed by Gibbon, to the point that it allowed the person to receive oxygenated blood, temporarily providing a blood free environment to work on the heart. In 1954, Kirklin's rival, C. Walton Lillehei used the technique of cross-circulation to operate on an 11-month-old baby who died on the 11th day after surgery. Usually using the parent for cross-circulation, he performed 45 operations of ventricular septal defects (VSDs), ASDs and tetralogy of Fallot. 30 survived and 20 were still alive 50 years later.

Following the experimental trial in dogs, which by 1955 had demonstrated a 90% survival following heart-lung bypass, Kirklin's team were granted permission by the governance of the Mayo Clinic to go ahead with a clinical trial in eight children, using the machine. In March 1955, the first child survived a repair of a VSD. In this planned series of clinical cases, a 50% survival was reported. This was the first clinical series of open heart surgeries performed with a mechanical pump-oxygenator. Prior to this, the conditions were predominantly fatal. He therefore performed the world's first successful series of open heart operations using the heart-lung machine. The Board of Governors at the Mayo Clinic approved the first eight operations, of whom four (50%) survived.

As a result, open heart surgeries and repairs of some heart defects could be performed under direct vision routinely and with a high degree of success. Kirklin's modifications and team work also allowed repairs of tetralogy of Fallot.

Varying in style and character, Lillehei and Kirklin worked only 90 miles away from each other. During the 1950s and 1960s, the trend for ambitious trainee cardiac surgeons was to fly to Minneapolis to observe Lillehei and subsequently travel to the Mayo Clinic to then watch Kirklin. One such surgeon was Donald Ross.

Initially, unsuccessful open heart surgery was frequently the result of errors in diagnosis and limited understanding of the anatomy and pathophysiology of the congenital heart defects that the surgeons were attempting to correct. Under Kirklin's leadership, other innovations contributing to better success at surgery included developments in establishing the correct diagnosis before surgery and in the progress of computerized intensive care unit monitoring after open heart surgery.

In 1960, he became Professor of Surgery and in 1964 he was appointed Chairman of the Department of Surgery at the Mayo Clinic.

In 1961, Italian surgical trainee Giancarlo Rastelli received a North Atlantic Treaty Organization (NATO) scholarship and entered into a fellowship under Kirklin's guidance.

== University of Alabama ==
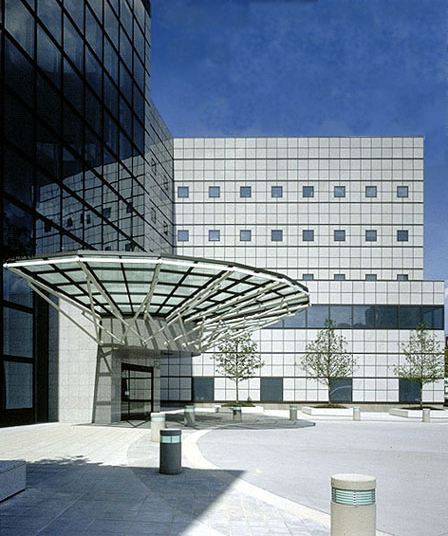
Kirklin Clinic

After years as the chair of the Department of Surgery at the Mayo Clinic, Kirklin accepted the same position at the University of Alabama at Birmingham School of Medicine in 1966, succeeding Champ Lyons. He later recounted that he felt he would be better able to develop a department of surgery and the training of surgeons in Birmingham. He built the school and UAB Hospital system into one of the leaders in the health care industry, and UAB named its Kirklin Clinic in his honour. He was also the editor for The Journal of Thoracic and Cardiovascular Surgery and established a training programme for surgical assistants at UAB.

In addition, Kirklin developed the use of technology for continuous monitoring of vital functions in the intensive care unit.

=== Surgical assistants ===
Kirklin had the idea of training surgeon assistants as a new type of physician assistant in the late 1960s.

He started the UAB's Surgeon Assistant (SA) Training Programme in 1967, with four students and enrolling his wife, Margaret Kirklin, as the programme's first Academic Director. This was America's first formal educational programme to train surgeon assistants.

== Personal and family ==
Kirklin married physician Margaret Katherine Hair. They had three children, of whom one son, James K. Kirklin is a cardiothoracic surgeon who became the Director of Cardiothoracic Transplantation at UAB and Director of the Division of Cardiothoracic Surgery.

== Later life and legacy ==
Kirklin retired in 1989. He died, aged 87, on April 21, 2004, following a head injury. During Kirklin's lifetime, almost one million heart operations had been performed around the world using the heart-lung bypass machine.

The John W. Kirklin Award for Professional Excellence is awarded by the American Association of Surgical Physician Assistants.

== Awards and honours ==
Among the awards and honours that Kirklin received are:

- Elected honorary FRCS England in 1970
- The Lister Medal 1972, for his contributions to surgical science. The corresponding Lister Oration, given at the Royal College of Surgeons of England, was delivered on 11 April 1973, and was titled 'An Academic Surgeon's Work'.
- The American Heart Association Research Achievement Award, 1976
- The Ray C. Fish Award (the medal of the Texas Heart Institute) 1977
- The Rudolph Matas Award in Vascular Surgery
- The Rene Leriche Prize of the International Society of Surgery and the American Surgical Association Medallion for Scientific Achievement

Between 1978 and 1979, he was president of the American Association for Thoracic Surgery.

In addition, he received honorary degrees from a number of universities including LMU Munich, the University of Alabama at Birmingham School of Medicine (UAB), Indiana University, the University of Bordeaux, and the University of Marseille.

== Selected publications ==
Kirklin had more than 700 publications to his name and with his colleague, Brian Barratt-Boyes, he authored the textbook Cardiac Surgery.

=== Books ===
- The Tetralogy of Fallot from a surgical viewpoint, with Robert B. Karp, Philadelphia: Saunders (1970), ISBN 978-0721654744
- Cardiac Surgery, Wiley, 1986. (With Brian Barratt-Boyes) ISBN 9780471014164
- "The Surgical Treatment of Acute Myocardial Infarction", co-authored with James K. Kirklin, International Practice in Cardiothoracic Surgery, Springer Dordrecht (1986), pp. 1069–1079 doi:10.1007/978-94-009-4259-2_92, ISBN 978-94-010-8391-1

=== Articles ===
- Kirklin JW, Dushane JW, Patrick RT, Donald DE, Hetzel PS, Harshbarger HG, Wood EH (1955). "Intracardiac surgery with the aid of a mechanical pump-oxygenator system (gibbon type): report of eight cases". Proc Staff Meet Mayo Clin. 30 (10): 201–6. doi:10.1016/S0025-6196(26)01694-0. PMID 14371757.
- Kirklin JW (1979). "A letter to Helen (presidential address)". J Thorac Cardiovasc Surg. 78 (5): 643–54. doi:10.1016/S0022-5223(19)38051-1. PMID 491719.
- Kirklin JW (1989). "The middle 1950s and C. Walton Lillehei". J Thorac Cardiovasc Surg. 98 (5): 822–4. doi:10.1016/s0022-5223(19)34259-x. PMID 2682017.,
- Jones RE, Donald DE, Swan HJ, Harshbarger HG, Kirklin JW, Wood EH (1955). "Apparatus of the Gibbon type for mechanical bypass of the heart and lungs; preliminary report". Proc Staff Meet Mayo Clin. 30 (6): 105–13. doi:10.1016/S0025-6196(24)00528-7. PMID 14371743.
- DuShane James W (1956). "Ventricular Septal Defects with Pulmonary Hypertension". Journal of the American Medical Association. 160 (11): 950–3. doi:10.1001/jama.1956.02960460028007. PMID 13295049.
