= The New Freedmen's Clinic =

Health care clinic in Washington, D.C., U.S.

Coordinates: 38.917529°N 77.020157°W

New Freedmen's Clinic
- Industry: health care clinic
- Founded: 2009
- Headquarters: Washington, D.C.
- Services: primary care; preventive care; mental health services; social services; prescription medications; language interpretation/translation

The New Freedmen's Clinic (first opened in the summer of 2009) is a free student-run health care clinic affiliated with Howard University Hospital (HUH) and Howard University College of Medicine (HUCM). It gets its name from HUH's original name - Freedmen's Hospital. It is currently located in the heart of Washington, DC, within HUH.

== Mission ==
"The HUCM Student Run Free Clinic Project is dedicated to improving access to quality healthcare to the local community. While serving the underserved population, the clinic will also provide education humanistic medicine and social justice for medical student volunteers."

== Overview ==
After attending a course in Portland, Oregon on how to organize student-run clinics, a third year student at Howard University College of Medicine found overwhelming support from both students and faculty for executing her plan to form a clinic that would be run by HUCM students. The students at the helm of the project visited area student-run clinics to observe their management and provide insight on the work needed to make their clinic a reality. Soon after, the students applied to the Association of American Medical Colleges for a grant and received one in the amount of $30,000, which went towards starting the clinic. That grant was supplemented by a large donation from the Howard University College of Medicine Alumni Foundation, a $25,000 award from the Gilead Foundation, and an astonishing $150,000 gift from an anonymous graduate of the College of Medicine's Class of 1941.

Each clinic day, there are two teams of medical students supervised by a Howard University Hospital physician. The Clinic "treats patients by appointment and those referred to them by the Hospital's Emergency Department" While the clinic still accepts mainly adults, it now boasts a variety of screening tests, an expanding array of services, as well as a strong community outreach program to better address the needs of the underserved.

== Clinic services ==
=== Primary care ===
- Physical Exams
- Wellness Checkups
- Non-urgent Care
- Diagnostic Tests

=== Preventative care ===
- Colon cancer screening
- Diabetes screening
- EKG (for heart disease)
- HIV screening
- Hypertension screening
- Kidney function test
- Liver function test
- Pap smear (women 21–65 years old are encouraged to get one about every three years)
- Pregnancy tests
- X-rays and more.

=== Mental health services ===
- Mental Health Disorders
- Substance Abuse
- Domestic Violence

=== Other services ===
- Social Services
- Prescription Medications
- Language Interpretation/Translation

== Sponsors ==
- Gilead Foundation
- Association of American Medical Colleges (AAMC)
- Anonymous Howard University College of Medicine Graduates

== See also ==
- Kirklin Clinic
