= Membrane oxygenator =

Device that replaces a lung

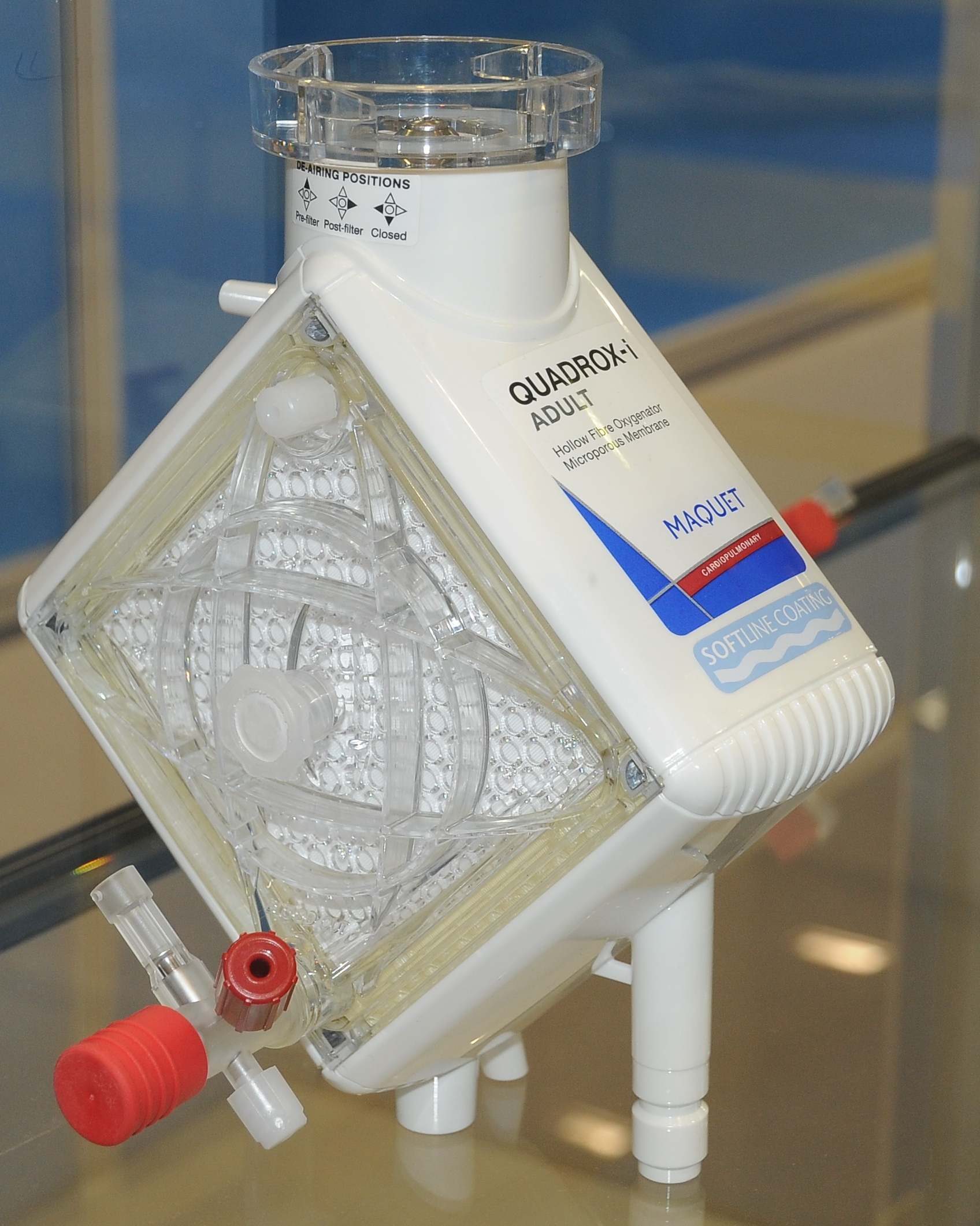
A MAQUET hollow fiber membrane oxygenator

A membrane oxygenator is a device used to add oxygen to, and remove carbon dioxide from the blood. It can be used in two principal modes: to imitate the function of the lungs in cardiopulmonary bypass (CPB), and to oxygenate blood in longer term life support, termed extracorporeal membrane oxygenation (ECMO). A membrane oxygenator consists of a thin gas-permeable membrane separating the blood and gas flows in the CPB circuit; oxygen diffuses from the gas side into the blood, and carbon dioxide diffuses from the blood into the gas for disposal.

== History ==
The history of the oxygenator, or artificial lung, dates back to 1885, with the first demonstration of a disc oxygenator, on which blood was exposed to the atmosphere on rotating discs by Von Frey and Gruber. These pioneers noted the dangers of blood streaming, foaming and clotting. In the 1920s and 30s, research into developing extracorporeal oxygenation continued. Working independently, Brukhonenko in the USSR and John Heysham Gibbon in the US demonstrated the feasibility of extracorporeal oxygenation. Brukhonenko used excised dog lungs, while Gibbon used a direct-contact drum-type oxygenator, perfusing cats for up to 25 minutes in the 1930s.

Gibbon's pioneering work was rewarded in May 1953 with the first successful cardiopulmonary bypass operation. The oxygenator was of the stationary film type, in which oxygen was exposed to a film of blood as it flowed over a series of stainless steel plates.

The disadvantages of direct contact between the blood and air were well recognized, and the less traumatic membrane oxygenator was developed to overcome these. The first membrane artificial lung was demonstrated in 1955 by the group led by Willem Kolff, and in 1956 the first disposable-membrane oxygenator removed the need for time-consuming cleaning before re-use. No patent was filed as Kolff believed that doctors should make technology available to all, without mind to profit.

The first membrane artificial lungs were composed of large flat sheets of thin silicone rubber used to separate blood and gas. Dr. Kolff recognized the need for a more compact lung design and constructed the first coiled lung design using polyethylene. However, these first designs were impractical due to high resistance and large priming volume. Inspired by Kolff's design, Theodor Kolobow designed the first successful spiral coil membrane lung in the laboratory of George Henry Alexander Clowes using a vinyl fiberglass screen to allow gas to more easily flow in the tube. For these and other innovations, including applying slight suction to form a tight seal and prevent hypobaric gas emboli, NIH was issued a patent in 1970 for the silicon rubber spiral coil membrane lung invented by Dr. Kolobow.

Kolobow, with the assistance of Dr. Warren Zapol and NIH veterinarian Joseph Price, attempted the first in vivo experiments using the spiral membrane artificial lung on canines and lambs. The team went on to invent the first artificial placenta in 1967.

The early artificial lungs used relatively impermeable polyethylene or Teflon homogeneous membranes, and it was not until more highly permeable silicone rubber membranes were introduced in the 1960s (and as hollow fibres in 1971) that the membrane oxygenator became commercially successful. The introduction of microporous hollow fibres with very low resistance to mass transfer revolutionized the design of membrane modules, as the limiting factor to oxygenator performance became the blood resistance. Current designs of oxygenator typically use an extraluminal flow regime, where the blood flows outside the gas-filled hollow fibers, for short term life support, while only the homogeneous membranes are approved for long term use.

== See also ==
- Bubble oxygenator
- Extracorporeal circulation
- E. Converse Peirce, made refinements to membrane oxygenator
- Experiments in the Revival of Organisms
