= Theodor Kolobow =

American physician, scientist

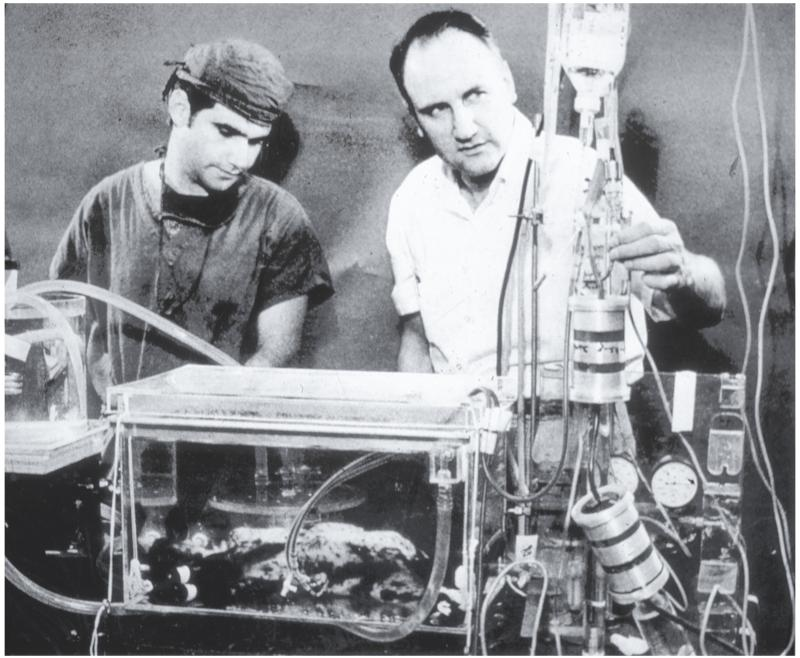
c. 1969. Drs. Theodor Kolobow (right) and Warren Zapol developed an artificial placenta which kept fetal lambs alive. This work helped lead to extracorporeal membrane oxygenation (ECMO), when a machine replaces the heart and lung for long periods of time.

Theodor Kolobow (1931 – 24 March 2018) was an American physician, scientist, physiologist, and inventor of medical devices, including the membrane oxygenator, common to most modern heart-lung machines.

== Early life and education ==
Theodor Kolobow was born in the town of Kärdla, Estonia. His father was a Russian Orthodox priest and lawyer. During World War II, he and his family spent time in a refugee camp in Augsburg, Germany, when forced to flee the invasion of the Russian Army. He learned to speak German, Russian, and English.

After World War II, at the age of 18, Kolobow and his family immigrated to the United States and he received a scholarship to attend Heidelberg College in Tiffin, Ohio. He was reported to have arrived in the United States with "$20 and his father's crucifix in his pocket." He graduated from Heidelberg College in 1954 with a degree in mathematics and physics. He graduated medical school at Case Western Reserve School of Medicine in 1958. As a first year medical student at Case Western, Kolobow worked in the laboratory of George H. A. Clowes on a project developing new methods to oxygenate blood during cardiopulmonary bypass.

Kolobow completed his medical training as a house officer in internal medicine and pulmonology at Cleveland Metropolitan General Hospital. He married his wife, Danielle, in 1963 and had 4 children and 9 grandchildren.

In 1962 he completed his medical training in Cleveland and joined the U.S. Public Health Service. He joined the NIH National Heart Institute as a staff associate and remained at NIH for the rest of his career.

== Medical contributions ==
Kolobow invented the silicone rubber spiral coil membrane lung, for which NIH was issued a patent in 1970. A Kolobow-designed Silastic membrane oxygenator is held in the collection of the Smithsonian Institution's National Museum of American History.

Kolobow developed the artificial placenta with Warren Zapol and veterinarian Joseph Pierce in 1967.

Kolobow with the help of Dr. Robert Bowman developed a left-ventricle assist device. When the left chamber of the heart is not working, this battery powered pump is able to help pump blood, keeping people alive until they are able to receive a heart transplant.

Kolobow also participated in establishing a foundational understanding of ventilator induced lung injury. Experimental studies which he conducted lead to the demonstration that conventional mechanical ventilation could itself cause lung tissue damage and advocated for strategies that minimized mechanical stress. This includes low tidal volume ventilation and permissive hypercapnia. These concepts later lead to a significant contribution in terms of lung protective ventilation approaches which are used in management and studies of acute respiratory distress syndrome (ARDS).
