= E. Converse Peirce II =

American physician and professor

Edmund Converse Peirce II (October 9, 1917 – August 8, 2003) was an American physician who was professor and director of hyperbaric medicine at the Mount Sinai School of Medicine in Manhattan, New York City from 1966 to 1991. During his career, Peirce published over 150 research articles and is notable for his well-regarded contributions to the refinement of artificial circulatory technologies including the membrane oxygenator.

== Biography ==
Born in Upper Montclair, New Jersey, Converse grew up in Bryn Mawr, Pennsylvania in the Quaker tradition. His father, Dr. George Peirce was a physician and chemist who was killed in a fire in the Colgate and Company research laboratories in Jersey City, New Jersey when Converse was 16 months old. His mother, Dr. Ethel Mathews Girdwood Peirce, raised Converse Peirce and three brothers while pursuing a career as a rheumatologist in Philadelphia.

He graduated from the Episcopal Academy in Philadelphia, Pennsylvania in 1936. He received an undergraduate degree from Harvard College in 1940 and an M.D. from Harvard Medical School in 1943. After service in the US Army Medical Corps, from 1946 to 1948 he was at the Children's Hospital in Boston, as Graduate Assistant in Pathology and then as Fellow, Surgery, Children's Hospital, Boston, Massachusetts. He then went to Baltimore, Maryland, where from 1948 to 1954 he was successively assistant professor, Anatomy, Johns Hopkins Medical School, and Surgical Fellow and Surgeon at the USPHS Hospital there. He then moved to Knoxville, Tennessee, where he rose to Chief of Surgery, in the Acuff Clinic, and associate professor of Physiology and Surgery, Emory University in Atlanta, Georgia. From 1966 to his retirement in 1991, he was Professor of Surgery and Director, hyperbaric medicine, at the Mount Sinai School of Medicine, Mount Sinai Hospital, New York City.

He died on August 8, 2003, at his home in Hancock, Maine.

== Awards ==
- 1962 The Osler Abbott Award of the Southern Thoracic Surgical Association

== Memberships ==
He was a member of the Southern Thoracic Surgical Association . the Society of Thoracic Surgeons , and a distinguished Fellow of the Accreditation Council for Graduate Medical Education (ACGME), Distinguished Fellow

Publications

Peirce published a total of 150 formal peer-reviewed scientific papers. In addition to continuing clinical and experimental studies on arterial catheterization, and papers on various clinical and experimental problems of cardiac physiology, the series of papers reporting the artificial organ work is:

- 1949 Tissue-culture Evaluation of the Viability of Blood Vessels Stored by Refrigeration; first author, with Robert E. Gross, Alexander H. Bill Jr., and Keith Merrill Jr. Annals of Surgery (March 1949) 129(3): 333–348
- 1949 Methods for Preservation and Transplantation of Arterial Grafts. with R.E. Gross and A. H. Bill. Surg Gynecol Obstet" 88 (6) 689-701 (1949). Cited 268 times
- 1950 Ventricular Fibrillation precipitated by Cardiac Catherization: Complete Recovery of the Patient. JAMA 143 (8) 717-720 1950 Cited 118 times
- 1952 Cross circulation for intracardiac surgery; with J. L. Southworth (first author). AMA Arch Surg 64(1):58-63 (Jan 1952)
- 1953 Diaphragm pump for artificial circulation, Tyson-Bowman pump; with J. L. Southworth, T. Tyson, et al. AMA Arch Surg 66(1): 53-9 (Jan 1953)
- 1953 Pump circuit for experimental intracardiac surgery of the left heart; with J. L. Southworth. AMA Arch Surg 66(2):218-25 (Feb 1953)
- 1953 Differential hypothermia for intracardiac surgery; preliminary report of a pump-oxygenator incorporating a heat exchanger; with V. B. Polley. AMA Arch Surg 67(4):
- 1958 Reduced metabolism by means of hypothermia and the low flow pump oxygenator; with C. H. Dabbs, W. K. Rogers, et al. Surg Gynecol Obstet 107(3):339-52 (Sep 1958)
- 1958 Diffusion of oxygen and carbon dioxide through teflon membranes. AMA Arch Surg 77(6):938-43 (Dec 1958)
- 1959 A new method of open heart surgery; with C. H. Dabbs, W. K. Rogers, et al. J Tn State Med Assoc 52(2):39-44 (Feb 1959)
- 1960 Metabolic acidosis and oxygen consumption before, during, and following total cardiopulmonary bypass with and without hypothermia; with C. H. Dabbs. Surg Forum 10:597-601 (1960)
- 1960 A modification of the Clowes membrane lung. J Thorac Cardiovasc Surg 39:438-48 (Apr 1960)
- 1960 The influence of membrane permeability and of design on gas exchange in the membrane lung; with J. W. Prados (first author). Trans Am Soc Artif Intern Organs 6:52-61 (Apr 10-11 1960)
- 1961 The membrane lung: an important technical improvement; with C. L. Gladson. J Thorac Cardiovasc Surg 42:275-6 (Aug 1961)
- 1962 A membrane lung-kidney; with P. M. Galletti (first author) and M. A. Hopf. Trans Am Soc Artif Intern Organs 8:47-52 (1962)
- 1962 A simplified heat exchanger for perfusion hypothermia. Arch Surg 84:329-33 (Mar 1962)*1962 Extracorporeal perfusion techniques in cancer chemotherapy. J Tn State Med Assoc 55:349-54 (Sep 1962)
- 1963 A pediatric perfusion system; with P. M. Galletti (first author), F. J. Martinez, D. E. Brinsfield, et al. Trans Am Soc Artif Intern Organs 9:244-50 (1963)
- 1964 Twenty-four-hour kidney storage with report of a successful canine autotransplant after total nephrectomy; with A. L Humphries (first author) and W. H. Moretz. Surgery 55:524-30 (Apr 1964)
- 1966 Further development and clinical evaluation of the Klung dialyzer; with J. H. Shinaberger (first author), E. P. Tuttle, et al. Trans Am Soc Artif Intern Organs 12:363-9 (1966)
- 1969 The membrane lung: studies with a new high permeability co-polymer membrane; with N. R. Dibelius. Trans Am Soc Artif Intern Organs 14:220-6 (1968)
- 1969 Extracorporeal Circulation for Open Heart Surgery. Springfield, IL: Charles C. Thomas publisher
- 1970 A comparison of the Lande-Edwards, the Peirce, and the General Electric-Peirce membrane lungs. Trans Am Soc Artif Intern Organs 16:358-64 (1970)*1971 Techniques of extended perfusion using a membrane lung; with A. L. Thebaut, B. B. Kent, et al. Ann Thorac Surg 12 (5): 451-70 (Nov 1971)
- 1972 Clinical use of Peirce—General Electric membrane oxygenator; with M. M. Kirsh (first author), O. Gago, et al. Ann Thorac Surg 14(2):140-9 (Aug 1972)
- 1972 The role of the artificial lung in the treatment of respiratory insufficiency: a perspective. Chest 62(5):Suppl:107S-117 (Nov 1972)
- 1973 The tissue tube as a vascular prosthesis; with I. Kott (first author), H. A. Mitty, et al. Arch Surg 106(2):206-7 (Feb 1973)
- 1973 The theory and function of the membrane lung. Mount Sinai Journal of Medicine 40(2):119-34 (March–April 1973)
- 1973 The use of hyperbaric oxygenation in conjunction with membrane lung perfusion for respiratory insufficiency; with C. W. Bryan-Brown, S. B. Lukban, J. H. Jacobson 2nd, and J. J. Rothschild. Mount Sinai Journal of Medicine 40(2):228-36 (March–April 1973)
- 1973 Respiratory support with a paracorporeal membrane oxygenator; with V. Charoenkul (first author) and F. Giron. J Surg Res 14(5):393-9 (May 1973)
- 1979 Extracorporeal membrane-oxygenation in severe acute respiratory-failure - randomized prospective study; with W. M. Zapol (first author), M. T. Snider, and J. D. Hill. Journal of the American Medical Association (JAMA) 242 (20): 2193-2196 1979 Cited 462 times
- 1979 Surgical approach to the implantation of an artificial lung; with L. A. Trudell (first author), C. Teplitz et al. Transactions of the American Society for Artificial Internal Organs 25:462-465 (1979)
- 1981 Is extracorporeal membrane-oxygenation a viable technique? Annals of Thoracic Surgery 31(2):102-104 (1981)
- 1989 Clinical-trials of a new polytetrafluoroethylene-silicone graft; with H. Schanzer (first author), G. Martinelli, K. Chiang, and L. Burrows. American Journal of Surgery 158(2):117-120 (Aug 1989)
- 1989 Are Oxygenators (airplanes, oil spills, pesticides) safe? Annals of Thoracic Surgery 48(4):467-468 (October 1989)
