= James Kirklin =

American cardiac surgeon

James K. Kirklin
- Born: 1947 (age 78–79); Rochester, Minnesota, US
- Education: Harvard Medical School
- Occupation: Cardiac surgeon
- Known for: Surgery for heart transplantation and mechanical circulatory support; Repair of congenital heart defects; Research in surgical outcomes
- Relatives: John W. Kirklin (Father)
- Medical career
- Profession: Heart surgeon
- Institutions: University of Alabama at Birmingham, US
- Research: Heart transplantation; Mechanical circulatory support; Surgical outcomes; Congenital heart defects

James K. Kirklin (born 1947 in Rochester, Minnesota) is an American cardiac surgeon who has made significant scientific and surgical contributions in the fields of heart transplantation and mechanical circulatory support devices to assist the pumping action of the heart. He was formerly Professor of Surgery (1987-2022), Director of the Division of Cardiothoracic Surgery (2006-2016), Director of the James and John Kirklin Institute for Research in Surgical Outcomes (KIRSO) (2016–2022), and Co-Director of Comprehensive Cardiovascular Center (2011-2017) at the University of Alabama at Birmingham (UAB). While at UAB, he held the UAB Cardiovascular Research Chair (1998-2006), the John Kirklin Chair of Cardiovascular Surgery (2006-2017), and the James Kirklin Chair of Cardiothoracic Surgery (2017-2022).

== Biography ==
Kirklin is the son of the late heart surgery pioneer John W. Kirklin. He graduated from Ohio State University in 1969, where he was an All-American diver. He received his MD from Harvard Medical School in 1973 as a member of the Alpha Omega Alpha academic honor society. Subsequently, he completed general and cardiothoracic surgery residencies at Massachusetts General Hospital in 1978 where he was Chief Resident, and pursued additional training at Boston Children's Hospital in 1979 and UAB School of Medicine, where he completed his training in 1981. He was appointed Assistant Professor of Surgery at UAB in 1981, Director of Cardiac Transplantation in 1986, Professor of Surgery in 1987, and in 2006 was named Director of the Division of Cardiothoracic Surgery. Kirklin's surgical expertise included surgery for congenital heart disease, heart transplantation, and mechanical circulatory support pumps. In 2012, Kirklin and his colleagues developed the first Children's Hospital pediatric cardiac surgical unit in the state of Alabama. In 2017, at the age of 70, he retired from clinical surgery to direct the Kirklin Institute for Research in surgical outcomes. Kirklin retired from UAB in 2022 at the age of 75 to become President of Kirklin Solutions, Inc., a UAB health technology start-up company (January 2023).

== Scientific work and surgical highlights ==
Kirklin and his colleagues at UAB pioneered the development of multi-institutional collaborative outcomes research in pediatric and adult heart transplantation and mechanical circulatory support. In 2007, he was the first surgeon to bridge an infant with failing single ventricular heart to successful heart transplantation, with a longer term pediatric heart assist device called the Berlin Heart ventricular assist device. In 2011, he was the first surgeon in North America to implant the HVAD continuous flow ventricular assist device in a child. This nine-year-old girl was supported for 60 days and she then underwent successful cardiac transplantation. In 2014, Kirklin was the first surgeon in North America to implant the Eva Heart continuous flow ventricular assist device. In 2015, Kirklin led the surgical team that implanted the Berlin Heart on the youngest baby (17 days old) to receive extended (greater than 1 month) mechanical circulatory support (136 days) before undergoing successful heart transplantation.

Kirklin and his colleagues at UAB established the Cardiac Transplant Research Database in 1990, which generated the first multi-institutional collaborative research in heart transplantation, producing numerous seminal publications over a 20-year span. In 1993, Kirklin and his UAB research group initiated the Pediatric Heart Transplant Study Group, which became the Pediatric Heart Transplant Society (PHTS), and continues to lead the field in multi-instuitional studies. In 2013, Kirklin was honored as a Founding Father of the PHTS. Kirklin's research group developed an international database platform for mechanical circulatory support (IMACS) within the International Society for Heart and Lung Transplantation (ISHLT) in 2012, and created and direct a global database for the World Society for Pediatric and Congenital Heart Surgery (WSPCHS) since 2017.

Kirklin was Principal Investigator of the $15 million NIH-funded national Registry for Mechanically Assisted Circulatory Support (INTERMACS) from 2006 to 2017. Kirklin is Past President of the International Society for Heart and Lung Transplantation (2009-2010) and Past President (2022-2024) of the World Society for Pediatric and Congenital Heart Surgery. In April 2016, UAB established the James and John Kirklin Institute for Research in Surgical Outcomes. In 2022, Kirklin received an Innovation Award as Most Prolific Inventor from the UAB Harbert Institute for Innovation and Entrepreneurship, based on the work of Kirklin and his colleagues.

Kirklin was first author of the textbook of Heart Transplantation in 2002, co-authored the fourth edition of the textbook of heart surgery Cardiac Surgery in 2013, and co-edited the book Mechanical Circulatory Support: A Companion to Braunwald's Heart Disease, 2nd Edition in 2019. He served as Editor of the Journal of Heart and Lung Transplantation from 2000–2009, and he was principal editor of the ISHLT Monograph Series (2006-2021). In 2014 Kirklin was the first recipient of the ISHLT Distinguished Educator Award. He has authored over 600 scientific publications. In 2026, Kirklin was first-editor of the fifth edition of the textbook Cardiac Surgery, originally first-authored by his father in 1986.

In 2020 Kirklin received the International Society for Heart and Lung Transplantation Lifetime Achievement Award. In 2021 he received the Pediatric Heart Transplant Society Lifetime Achievement Award.

== Awards and honors ==
Among the honors Kirklin has received are:

- 2009 - President - International Society for Heart and Lung Transplantation
- 2014 - Distinguished Educator Award - International Society for Heart and Lung Transplantation
- 2018 - William Glenn Lecture Award - American Heart Association
- 2020 - Lifetime Achievement Award - International Society for Heart and Lung Transplantation
- 2021 - Lifetime Achievement Award - Pediatric Heart Transplant Society.
- 2022 - President - World Society for Pediatric and Congenital Heart Surgery
