= Kirklin Clinic =

Hospital in Alabama, United States

Coordinates: 33.507978°N 86.800224°W

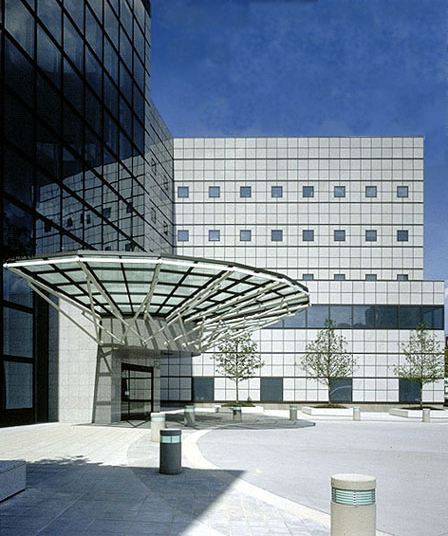

The Kirklin Clinic is the primary adult outpatient clinic of the medical staff of UAB Hospital, and of the faculty of the University of Alabama at Birmingham (UAB) Heersink School of Medicine.

== Overview ==
Kirklin Clinic also is the site for many clinical rotations in the medical school's doctoral and residency programs. It was named for the School of Medicine's pioneering cardiac surgeon John W. Kirklin, who was noted for bringing the heart-lung machine into practical use in heart surgery.

== Design ==
It was designed by the noted architect, I. M. Pei. Opened in July 1992, the Clinic is owned and operated by the nonprofit University of Alabama Health Services Foundation. It is located at 2000 6th Avenue South in Birmingham.

== Expansion ==
During 2016 and 2017, the Kirklin Clinic underwent a $10 million project to expand its clinical space by 64,000 sq ft.

== See also ==
- Rushton Clinic
