= Warren Zapol =

American anesthesiologist (1942–2021)

Warren M. Zapol
- Medical career
- Profession: Physician
- Field: Anesthesiology
- Institutions: Massachusetts General Hospital and Harvard Medical School Massachusetts Institute of Technology (MIT)

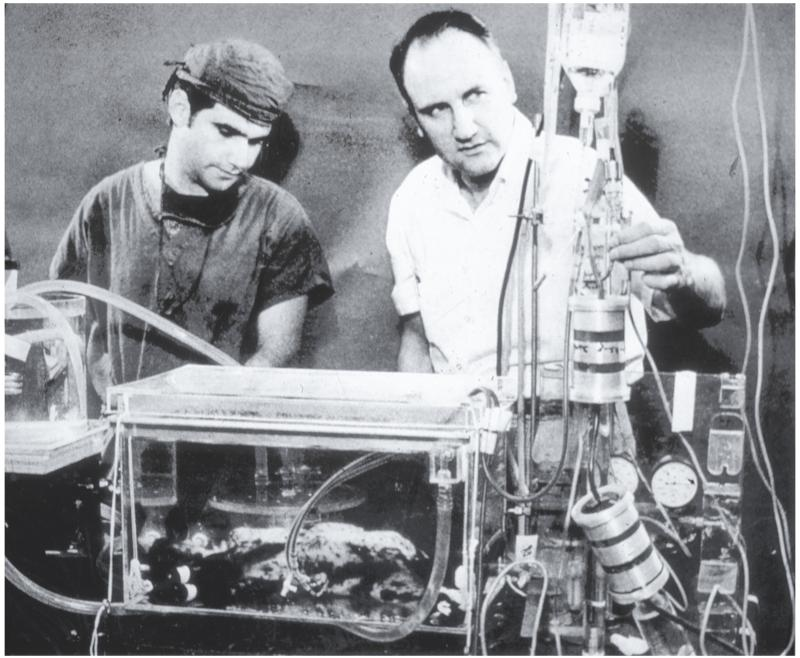
c. 1967. Theodor Kolobow and Warren Zapol

Warren M. Zapol (1942 – 14 December 2021) was the emeritus Anesthetist-in-Chief at Massachusetts General Hospital from (1994–2008) and the Reginald Jenney Distinguished Professor of Anaesthesia at Harvard Medical School. From 1994 to 2008, Zapol served as anesthetist-in-chief at MGH and was the director of the MGH Anesthesia Center for Critical Care Research until his death.

The Warren M. Zapol Professorship in Anesthesiology at Harvard Medical School and the Massachusetts General Hospital is named in his honor. As of 2022, Emery N. Brown is the current Warren M. Zapol Professor of Anesthesiology.

== Early life and education ==
Zapol was born in New York and attended Stuyvesant High School. He received his undergraduate education at MIT (1962) and his MD from the University of Rochester School of Medicine (1966).

Following graduation from the University of Rochester, Zapol served in the U.S. Public Health Service from 1967 to 1970. He then began his research at the U.S. National Institutes of Health (NIH) as a Staff Associate of the National Heart, Lung, and Blood Institute. Under the mentorship of Theodor Kolobow, Zapol designed an artificial placenta for premature lambs and performed some of the first long-term extracorporeal membrane oxygenation (ECMO) perfusions in neonates and adults with infant respiratory distress syndrome or acute respiratory distress syndrome (ARDS).

== Career ==
Zapol's major research efforts included studies of acute respiratory failure in animals and humans. Supported by the National Science Foundation, he has led nine Antarctic expeditions to study the diving mechanisms and adaptations of the Weddell seal. Through that research his team learned how marine mammals avoid the bends and hypoxia (low blood oxygen levels). He was elected to membership in the (then) Institute of Medicine of the National Academy of Sciences in 2002.

In 2003, Zapol and his former research fellow Claes Frostell received the Inventor of the Year award from the Intellectual Property Owners Association for the development of a system to safely deliver inhaled nitric oxide, a technique now used to save the lives of thousands of babies each year that he pioneered with his MGH team.

In 2006, a steep mountain glacier in Antarctica was named for Zapol (78° 35’S, 85° 51’W).

From 2008 through 2016, he was appointed by President George W. Bush and in 2012 reappointed by President Barack Obama as an academic representative to the U.S. Arctic Research Commission.

In 2011, he presented the third annual John W. Severinghaus Lecture on Translational Research at the American Society of Anesthesiologists Annual Meeting.

In 2012, he was designated as a Distinguished Scientist by the American Heart Association.

In 2014, Zapol together with his son David Zapol founded Third Pole Therapeutics, a US-based company developing next generation life-saving heart and lung therapies. The company is developing products that will generate and deliver electric nitric oxide.

Zapol was inducted as a Fellow by the National Academy of Inventors in 2016.
