= Perfusionist =

Healthcare professional who uses the cardiopulmonary bypass machine

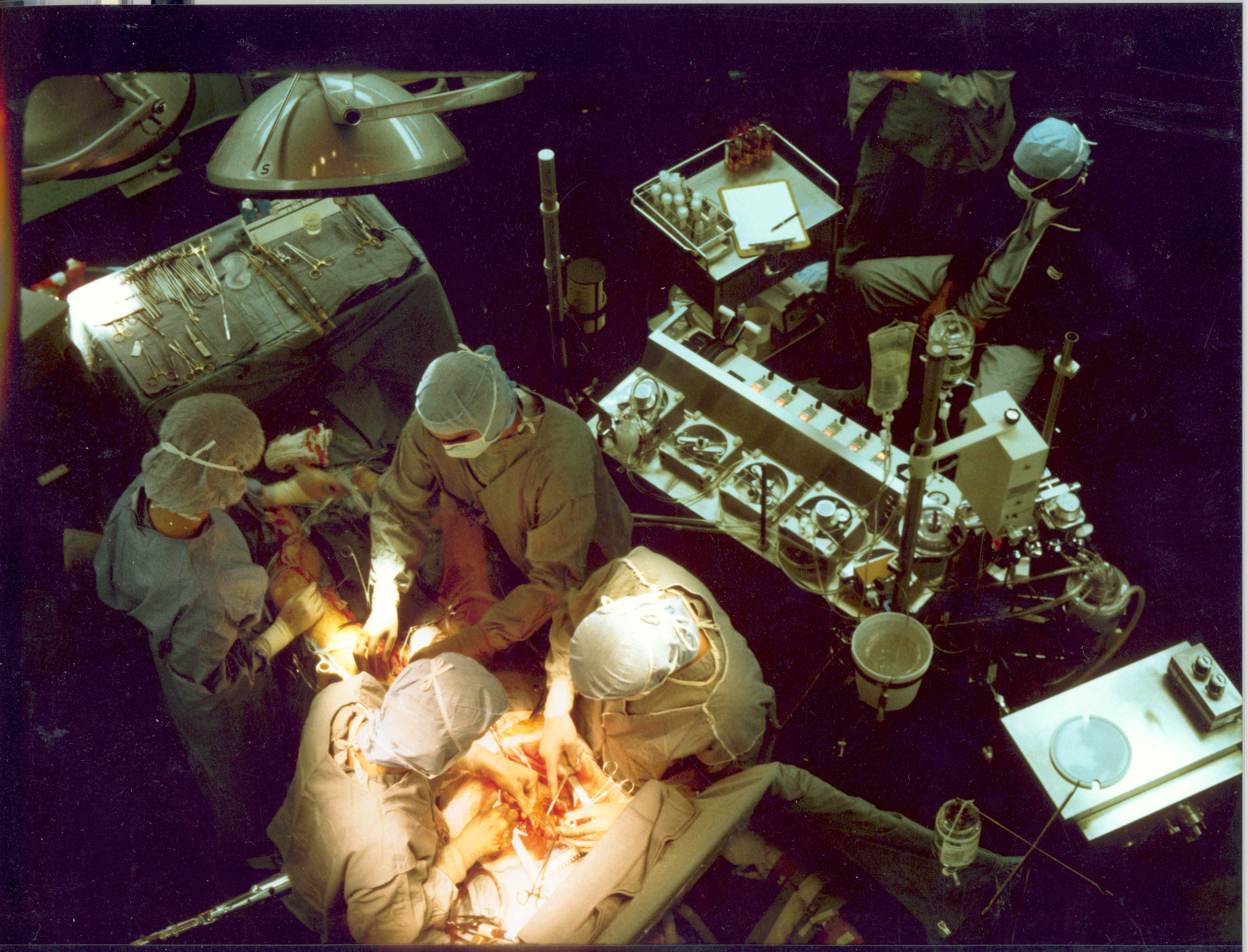
- A perfusionist in front of a heart–lung machine (upper right) early in a coronary artery bypass surgery

Occupation
- Synonyms: Cardiovascular perfusionist; Clinical perfusionist; Perfusiologist; Cardiac surgery and perfusion technologist; Cardiopulmonary bypass doctor (occasionally) or clinical perfusion scientist
- Occupation type: Healthcare professional
- Activity sectors: Medicine, Surgery
- Specialty: Cardiopulmonary bypass Extracorporeal procedure General Surgery; Cardiac surgery CABG, Valve replacement, Aortic aneurysm repair Coronary catheterization

Description
- Fields of employment: Hospital
- Related jobs: Anesthesiologist, Cardiothoracic surgeon, Respiratory therapist

A cardiovascular perfusionist is a healthcare professional, theoretically trained in general, pediatric, cardiac and thoracic surgery who operates the cardiopulmonary bypass during cardiac surgery and other surgeries that require cardiopulmonary bypass to manage the patient's physiological status. As an extremely crucial member of the cardiovascular surgical team, the perfusionist helps maintain blood flow to the body's tissues as well as regulate levels of oxygen and carbon dioxide in the blood, using a heart–lung machine.

== Duties ==
Perfusionists form part of the wider cardiovascular surgical team which includes cardiac surgeons, anesthesiologists, and residents. Their role is to conduct extracorporeal circulation as well as ensure the management of physiologic functions by monitoring the necessary variables. The perfusionist provides consultation to the physician in selecting appropriate equipment and techniques to be used.

Perfusionists are trained theoretically in a wide range of surgeries – including general surgery, adult cardiac surgery (such as CABG, valve replacements, aortic aneurysm repair, aortic dissection repair, Bentall procedure, and ASD/VSD closure), coronary angiography, cannulation, pediatric and congenital cardiac surgeries (such as TOF repair, arterial switch for TGA, TAPVC/PAPVC repair, Fontan procedure, Glenn shunt, BT shunt, coarctation repair, and Norwood/Rastelli procedures), as well as thoracic surgeries and transplant procedures – although they do not perform surgical procedures themselves.

Other responsibilities include administering blood products, administering anesthetic agents or drugs, measuring selected laboratory values (such as blood cell count), monitoring circulation, monitoring blood gases, surveil anticoagulation, induction of hypothermia, and hemodilution. Sometimes, perfusionists are granted administrative tasks such as purchasing supplies or equipment, as well as personnel and departmental management.

=== Involved procedures ===
Perfusionists can be involved in a number of cardiac surgical procedures, select vascular procedures and a few other surgical procedures in an ancillary role.

Perfusionists may participate in curative or staged palliative procedures to treat the following pediatric pathologies:

- Atrial septal defects,
- Ventricular septal defects,
- tetralogy/pentalogy of Fallot,
- Truncus arteriosus,
- Transposition of the great vessels,
- Cardiac transplants,
- Lung transplants,
- Coarctation of the aorta,
- Interrupted aortic arch,
- hypoplastic left/right heart,
- Subaortic membrane,
- Mitral valve repair/replacement,
- Aortic valve disorders,
- Anomalous/single Coronary artery,
- Vascular ring,
- Extracorporeal membrane oxygenation (ECMO)

Adult surgical procedures may include:

- Coronary artery bypass,
- Aortic valve replacements,
- Mitral valve repair/mitral valve replacement
- Tricuspid valve repair
- Aortic root replacements
- Atrial myxomas
- dissections/aneurysms/trauma of the aorta (ascending, arch & descending)
- Renal cell carcinoma/obstructive vena cava
- Veno-venous bypass (e.g. during liver transplants)
- Cardiac/lung transplants
- Implants of ventricular assist device and ECMO.

Select ancillary procedures in which perfusion techniques and/or perfusionists may be involved include isolated limb perfusion, intraperitoneal hyperthermic chemoperfusion and tracheal resection/repair.

== Training and certification ==
=== United States ===
In the United States, a four-year bachelor's degree is a prerequisite for admission into an accredited perfusion program, typically with a concentration in biology, chemistry, anatomy and physiology, varying depending on specific perfusion program. As of 2025, there are 23 accredited perfusion training programs, of which 18 are master's degrees, 3 bachelor's degrees, and one certificate program Training typically consists of two years of academic and clinical education. A perfusion student will typically begin his or her training in a didactic fashion in which the student will closely follow instructions from a certified clinical perfusionist in the confines of a cardiac surgery procedure. Academic coursework may be concurrent or precede this clinical instruction. Early in their clinical training, the perfusion student may have little involvement outside of an observational role. However, as time progresses, more tasks may be incrementally delegated to them. Upon graduating from a perfusion program, the graduate must begin the certification process. In the interim, the perfusion graduate is typically referred to as board-eligible, which is sufficient for employment in cardiac surgery with the understanding that achieving certified status is required for long-term employment. Most employers have stipulations on the duration of board-eligible status.

To become certified as a certified clinical perfusionist, a perfusionist must undergo a two-part exam administered by the American Board of Cardiovascular Perfusion. The first part is the Perfusion Basic Science Exam and the second part the Clinical Applications in Perfusion Exam. The exam process is open to a perfusion student who has graduated, or is about to graduate, from an accredited perfusion education program. In addition, a perfusion student must have participated in a minimum of 75 perfusions during the course of their training before sitting for the Perfusion Basic Science Exam and performed 40 independent perfusions after graduation before sitting for the Clinical Applications in Perfusion Exam. Upon passing the Clinical Applications in Perfusion Exam, the perfusionist is designated a certified clinical perfusionist.

Following certification, perfusionists must be recertified every year by attaining minimum clinical and educational requirements. Proof of fulfillment of these recertification requirements must be submitted to the American Board of Cardiovascular Perfusion and are mandatory to maintain certified status to use the designation.

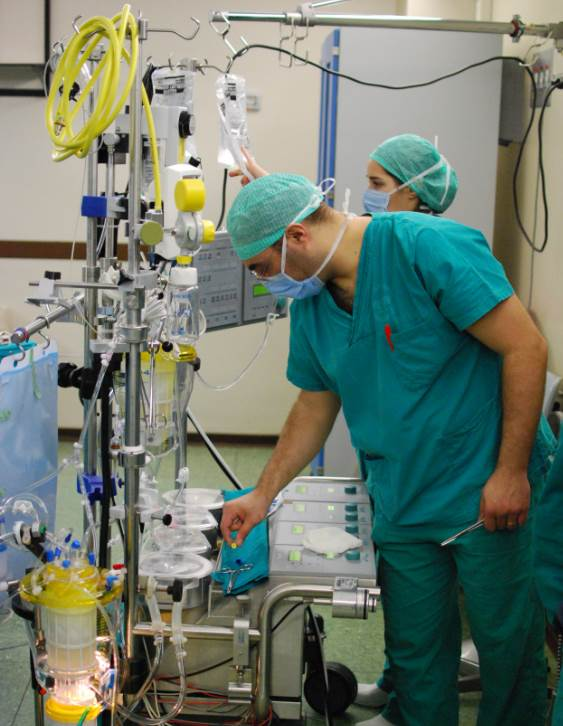
Perfusionist operating a modern heart–lung machine

As of February 2010, there were 3,766 certified perfusionists in the United States and approximately 300 certified perfusionists in Canada.

=== Canada ===
In Canada, there are three training programs: Burnaby in Western Canada, Toronto and Montreal in Eastern Canada. British Columbia Institute of Technology in Burnaby offers an advanced specialty certificate in cardiovascular perfusion to graduates of its two-year program. Applicants must be certified respiratory therapists, critical care nurses, or cardiac professionals with two years or more of current experience in cardiac critical care. Applicants to the Michener Institute program in Toronto must have a bachelor's degree at minimum, with or without respiratory therapy, nursing or other clinical certification. The master's program is two years. The perfusion program of the Université de Montréal is a three-year bachelor's degree of 90 credits in biomedical science of which 27 credits are specific to clinical perfusion and in addition a diplôme d'études supérieurs spécialisées (DESS) of 30 credits in clinical perfusion of one-year at the master level.

=== United Kingdom and Ireland ===
In the United Kingdom and Ireland, a bachelor's degree in a science subject (usually life or clinical sciences) is a prerequisite to enrolment on the two-year perfusion training course. Trainees must complete a two-year MSc program at the University of Bristol while employed as a trainee perfusionist by a sponsoring hospital trust. This post is paid as an annex U AfC band 7. They complete academic assessments (essays and exams), while in the workplace moving from a purely observational role to one in which they are capable of managing the patient while they are on cardiopulmonary system with minimal supervision. Once a trainee has been the primary perfusionist in 150 clinical procedures, they must undertake a practical exam. For this exam, the candidate is observed by two external examiners whilst building and priming a cardiopulmonary circuit, then using it during a surgical operation. After the practical exam, trainees must complete a 40-minute viva voce exam, which tests their academic knowledge. After this is successfully completed, they are awarded an MSc in Clinical Perfusion Science and the status of accredited clinical perfusion scientist. They must maintain this by performing a minimum of 40 clinical procedures per year.

=== Australia and New Zealand ===
In some states of Australia and New Zealand, a perfusionist must have at least a science degree (usually in health sciences) as an entry requirement before training. Further didactic training is in a practical format at a hospital whilst doing a three-year course via correspondence and e-learning, with the Australian and New Zealand College of Perfusionists (ANZCP). The final examination for a clinical perfusionist is administered by the ANZCP over two days. This involves three hours of written assessment, two hours of multiple choice questions, and four half-hour viva voce. Perfusion training is determined by the hospital at which the perfusionist is employed and may involve a hospital accredited training program which is determined by the health department to be the equivalent of ANZCP certification program.

In Australia perfusion can also be provided by a medically trained physician who has undertaken additional subspecialty training.

=== India ===
In India, there are different programs for educating perfusionists. A three-year bachelor's degree program, Bachelor in Cardiac Perfusion Technology, with about 19 subjects- Human Anatomy, Human Physiology, Biochemistry, Microbiology, Pharmacology, Pathology, Applied Physics, Applied Mathematics, Computer Applications, Introduction to Perfusion Technology, Cardiac Anatomy and Physiology, Cardiac Diseases and Disorders, Perfusion Equipment and Technology, Extracorporeal Circulation Techniques, Clinical Perfusion Practice, Critical Care Technology, General Surgery, Cardiac Surgery, Thoracic Surgery, Pediatric Surgery, Medical Ethics and Hospital Management, Research Methodology and Biostatistics and with one-year internship, a two-year post-graduate, Master in Cardiac Perfusion Technology, and diploma are available. Bachelor's and master's degree in some reputed institutions (i.e. PGI Chandigarh, AIIMS New Delhi, JIPMER, Gandhi Medical College, Bhopal, naryana groups Bangalore, Sawai Mansingh Medical College Jaipur, NIMS University, Sher-e-Kashmir Institute of Medical Sciences, Srinagar). Recently, the Board of Cardiovascular Perfusion of India introduced certification.

=== Other countries ===
In China, Egypt, and some South American countries, a clinical perfusionist is a medical doctor who has completed subspecialty training. In Argentina, a perfusionist is a medical doctor, usually a cardiologist, who has undertaken additional sub-specialty training. They are often referred to as hemodinamistas (hemodynamics specialists).

In Europe, perfusionist education standards are set by the European organisation of perfusion, EBCP (The European Board of Cardiovascular Perfusion) and has been implemented in many European countries. The length of the education and training varies between 1 and 4 years, depending on requirements for entering the program. In the northern countries of Europe, Scandinavia including Sweden, Denmark and Norway, perfusionists are educated at Aarhus University at the Scandinavian School of Cardiopulmonary Technology. Most perfusionist candidates are educated intensive care nurses/anaesthetic nurses and the education includes a Master Thesis in Cardiopulmonary Technology.

In the Dominican Republic, there is a master's program in perfusion from the Latin American Perfusion Association (ALAP), endorsed by the Universidad Nacional Pedro Henríquez Ureña. Graduates can also opt for certification from the Latin American Perfusion Board, a voluntary regional accreditation designed to guarantee professional standards.
