= Oxygenator =

Medical equipment capable of exchanging oxygen and carbon dioxide in human blood

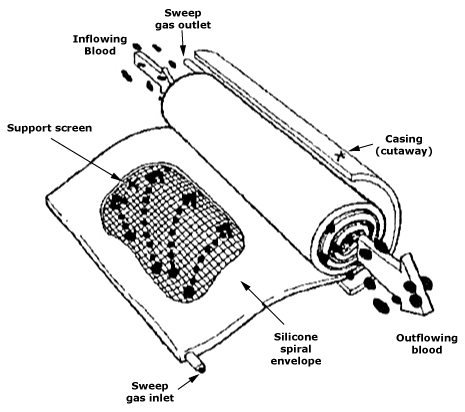
Schematic of silicone membrane oxygenator

An oxygenator is a medical device that is capable of exchanging oxygen and carbon dioxide in the blood of human patients during surgical procedures that may necessitate the interruption or cessation of blood flow in the body, a critical organ or great blood vessel. These organs can be the heart, lungs or liver, while the great vessels can be the aorta, pulmonary artery, pulmonary veins or vena cava.

== Usage ==
An oxygenator is typically utilized by a perfusionist in cardiac surgery in conjunction with the heart-lung machine. However, oxygenators can also be utilized in extracorporeal membrane oxygenation in neonatal intensive care units by nurses. For most cardiac operations such as coronary artery bypass grafting, the cardiopulmonary bypass is performed using a heart-lung machine (or cardiopulmonary bypass machine). The heart-lung machine serves to replace the work of the heart during the open bypass surgery. The machine replaces both the heart's pumping action and the lungs' gas exchange function. Since the heart is stopped during the operation, this permits the surgeon to operate on a bloodless, stationary heart.

One component of the heart-lung machine is the oxygenator. The oxygenator component serves as the lung, and is designed to expose the blood to oxygen and remove carbon dioxide. It is disposable and contains about 2–4 m² of a membrane permeable to gas but impermeable to blood, in the form of hollow fibers. Blood flows on the outside of the hollow fibers, while oxygen flows in the opposite direction on the inside of the fibers. As the blood passes through the oxygenator, the blood comes into intimate contact with the fine surfaces of the device itself. Gas containing oxygen and medical air is delivered to the interface between the blood and the device, permitting the blood cells to absorb oxygen molecules directly.

== Heparin-coated blood oxygenator ==
=== Rationale ===
Operations which involve uncoated CPB circuits require a high dose of systemic heparin. Although the effects of heparin are reversible by administering protamine, there are a number of side effects associated with this. Side effects can include allergic reaction to heparin resulting in thrombocytopenia, various reactions to the administration of protamine and post-operative hemorrhage due to inadequate reversal of the anticoagulation. Systemic heparin does not completely prevent clotting or the activation of complement, neutrophils, and monocytes, which are the principal mediators of the inflammatory response. This response produces a wide range of cytotoxins, and cell-signaling proteins that circulate throughout the patient's body during surgery and disrupt homeostasis. The inflammatory responses can produce microembolic particles. A greater source of such microemboli are caused by the suction of surgical debris and lipids into the CPB circuit.

Microparticles obstruct arterioles that supply small nests of cells throughout the body and, together with cytotoxins, damage organs and tissues and temporarily disturb organ function. All aspects of cardiopulmonary bypass, including manipulation of the aorta by the surgeon, may be associated with neurological symptoms following perfusion. Physicians refer to such temporary neurological deficits as “pumphead syndrome.” Heparin-coated blood oxygenators are one option available to a surgeon and a perfusionist to decrease morbidity associated with CPB to a limited degree.

Heparin-coated oxygenators are thought to:

- Improve overall biocompatibility and host homeostasis
- Mimic the natural endothelial lining of the vasculature
- Reduce the need for systemic anticoagulation
- Better maintain platelet count
- Reduce adhesion of plasma proteins
- Prevent denaturation and activation of adhered proteins and blood cells
- Avoid complications resulting from an abnormal pressure gradient across the oxygenator

=== Surgical outcomes ===
Heparin coating is reported to result in similar characteristics to the native endothelium. It has been shown to inhibit intrinsic coagulation, inhibit host responses to extracorporeal circulation, and lessen postperfusion, or “pumphead,” syndrome. Several studies have examined the clinical efficacy of these oxygenators.

Mirow et al. 2001 examined the effects of heparin-coated cardiopulmonary bypass systems combined with full and low dose systemic heparinization in coronary artery bypass patients. The researchers concluded that

- Heparin-coated extracorporeal circuits with reduced systemic heparinization lead to significantly increased thrombin generation.
- Postoperative bleeding was reduced with low systemic heparinization, but the reduction was not significant.

Ovrum et al. 2001 compared the clinical outcomes of 1336 patients with the Carmeda Bioactive Surface and Duraflo II coatings. The researchers concluded that:

- Duraflo II patients required less heparin to keep the target activated clotting time
- Effects on renal function and platelets were similar
- Incidence of perioperative MI, stroke, and hospital mortality were similar
- Reduced incidence of postoperative atrial fibrillation compared to identical uncoated controls
- Overall clinical results were favorable in both groups

Statistics and conclusions from more studies are available here. Clearly, heparin-coated blood oxygenators exhibit some advantages over non-coated oxygenators. Some hospitals use heparin-coated oxygenators for the large majority of their cases requiring cardiopulmonary bypass. It is unclear whether most surgeons actually reduce the amount of systemic heparin used when their patients are being perfused with heparin-coated oxygenators. Ultimately, each surgeon makes this decision based upon the needs of individual patient.

Although they offer advantages, these oxygenators are not widely regarded by surgeons as revolutionary breakthroughs in cardiopulmonary bypass. This is attributable to the fact that most of the morbidity associated with CPB is not caused by the contact between the blood with the oxygenator. The leading cause of hemolysis and microemboli is the return of blood suctioned from the surgical field to the CPB circuit. This blood has come into contact with air, lipids and debris that can significantly increase system inflammatory response. Surgeons are instead looking to off-pump cardiac procedures, wherein surgery is performed on beating hearts, as the next “big thing” in open heart surgery.

Coated circuits have not been proven to alter surgical outcomes in any statistically significant manner. Furthermore, coated circuits are significantly more expensive than conventional circuits.

== See also ==
- Cardiac Surgery
- Cardiothoracic surgery
- Coronary artery bypass surgery
- Extracorporeal membrane oxygenation
- Heart-lung machine
- Membrane oxygenator
- Perfusionist
- Neonatal Intensive Care Unit
- Thrombin
