= Cardiopulmonary bypass =

Technique that temporarily takes over the function of the heart and lungs during surgery

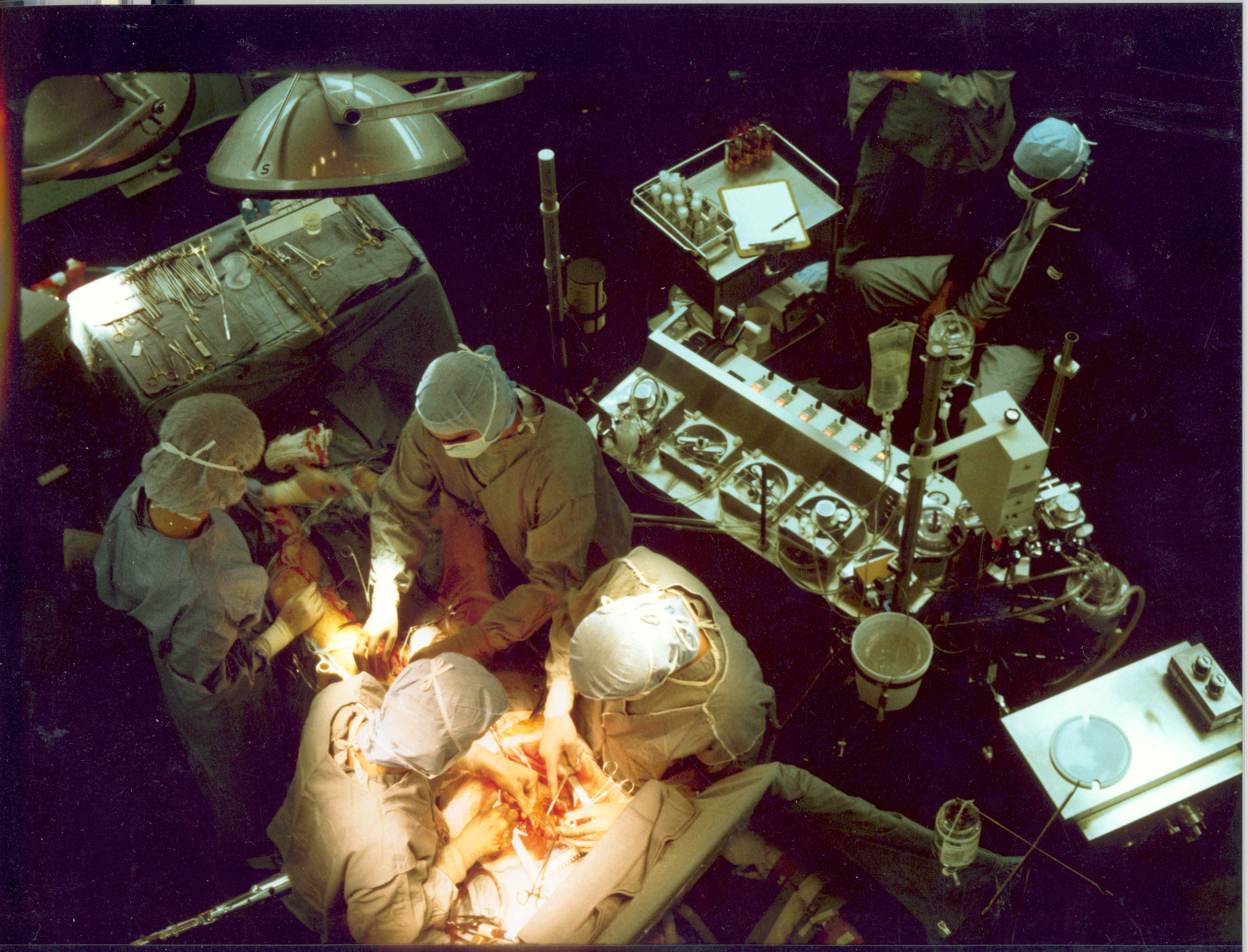
- A heart–lung machine (upper right) in a coronary artery bypass surgery
- Specialty: Cardiac surgery
- ICD-10-PCS: 12
- ICD-9-CM: 39.61
- MeSH: D002315
- OPS-301 code: 14
- Other codes: 22570829

Cardiopulmonary bypass (CPB) or heart-lung machine, also called the pump or CPB pump, is a machine, operated by a cardiac perfusionist, that temporarily takes over the function of the heart and lungs during open-heart surgery by maintaining the circulation of blood and oxygen throughout the body. As such it is an extracorporeal device.

The machine mechanically circulates and oxygenates blood throughout the patient's body while bypassing the heart and lungs allowing the surgeon to work in a bloodless surgical field.

== Uses ==
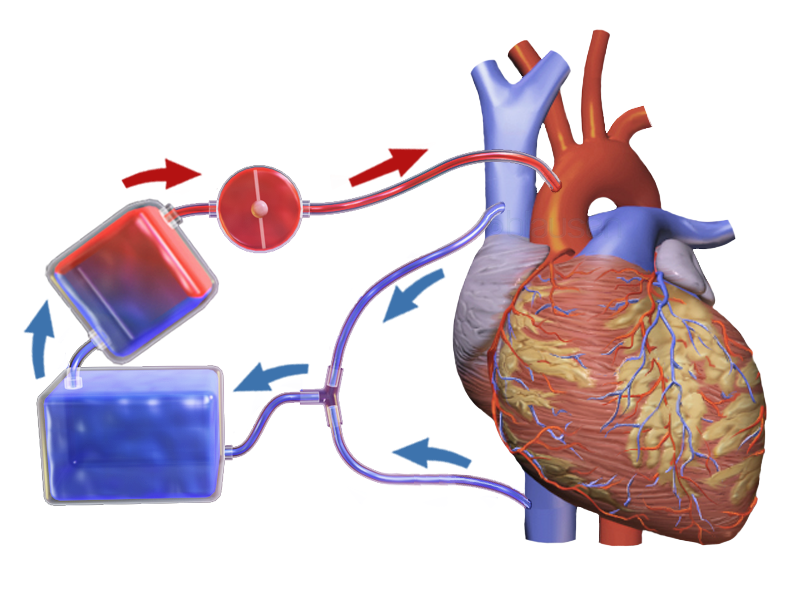
Illustration of one typical way that a heart-lung machine may be connected to the veins and arteries near the heart. The three implements on the left represent (from top to bottom) the pump, the oxygenator, and the reservoir.

CPB is commonly used in operations or surgical procedures involving the heart. The technique allows the surgical team to oxygenate and circulate the patient's blood, thus allowing the surgeon to operate safely on the heart. In many operations, such as coronary artery bypass grafting (CABG), the heart is arrested, due to the degree of the difficulty of operating on a beating heart.

Operations requiring the opening of the chambers of the heart, for example mitral valve repair or replacement, require the use of CPB. This is to avoid engulfing air systemically, and to provide a bloodless field to increase visibility for the surgeon. The machine pumps the blood by using an oxygenator, allowing red blood cells to pick up oxygen, as well as allowing carbon dioxide levels to decrease. This mimics the function of the heart and the lungs, respectively.

=== Hypothermia ===
CPB can be used for the induction of total body hypothermia, a state in which the body can be maintained for up to 45 minutes without perfusion (blood flow). If blood flow is stopped at normal body temperature, permanent brain damage can occur in three to four minutes — death may follow. Similarly, CPB can be used to rewarm individuals who have hypothermia. This rewarming method of using CPB is successful if the core temperature of the patient is above 16 °C.

=== Cooled blood ===
The blood is cooled during CPB and is returned to the body. The cooled blood slows the body's basal metabolic rate, decreasing its demand for oxygen. Cooled blood usually has a higher viscosity, but the various crystalloid or colloidal solutions that are used to prime the bypass tubing serve to dilute the blood. Maintaining appropriate blood pressure for organs is a challenge, but it is monitored carefully during the procedure. Hypothermia is also maintained (if necessary), and the body temperature is usually kept at 28 to 32 °C (82 to 90 °F).

=== Extracorporeal membrane oxygenation ===
Extracorporeal membrane oxygenation (ECMO) is a simplified version of the heart-lung machine that includes a centrifugal pump and an oxygenator to temporarily take over the function of heart and/or the lungs. ECMO is useful for post-cardiac surgery patients with cardiac or pulmonary dysfunction, patients with acute pulmonary failure, massive pulmonary embolisms, lung trauma from infections, and a range of other problems that impair cardiac or pulmonary function.

ECMO gives the heart and/or lungs time to repair and recover, but is only a temporary solution. Patients with terminal conditions, cancer, severe nervous system damage, uncontrolled sepsis, and other conditions may not be candidates for ECMO.

== Usage scenarios ==
CPB is used in scenarios such as:

- Coronary artery bypass surgery
- Cardiac valve repair and/or replacement (aortic valve, mitral valve, tricuspid valve, pulmonic valve)
- Repair of large septal defects (atrial septal defect, ventricular septal defect, atrioventricular septal defect)
- Repair and/or palliation of congenital heart defects (Tetralogy of Fallot, transposition of the great vessels)
- Transplantation (heart transplantation, lung transplantation, heart–lung transplantation, liver transplantation)
- Repair of some large aneurysms (aortic aneurysms, cerebral aneurysms)
- Pulmonary thromboendarterectomy
- Pulmonary thrombectomy
- Isolated limb perfusion

== Contraindications and special considerations ==
There are no absolute contraindications to cardiopulmonary bypass. However, there are several factors that need to be considered by the care team when planning an operation.

Heparin-induced thrombocytopenia and heparin-induced thrombocytopenia and thrombosis are potentially life-threatening conditions associated with the administration of heparin. In both of these conditions, antibodies against heparin are formed which causes platelet activation and the formation of blood clots. Because heparin is typically used in CPB, patients who are known to have the antibodies responsible for heparin-induced thrombocytopenia and heparin-induced thrombocytopenia and thrombosis require alternative forms of anticoagulation. Bivalirudin is the most studied heparin-alternative in people with heparin-induced thrombocytopenia and heparin-induced thrombocytopenia and thrombosis requiring CPB.

A small percentage of patients, such as those with an antithrombin III deficiency, may exhibit resistance to heparin. In these patients, patients may need additional heparin, fresh frozen plasma, or other blood products such as recombinant anti-thrombin III to achieve adequate anticoagulation.

A persistent left superior vena cava is thoracic system variation in which the left-sided vena cava fails to involute during normal development. It is the most common variation of the thoracic venous system, occurring in approximately 0.3% of the population. The abnormality is often detected on pre-operative imaging studies, but may also be discovered intra-operatively. A persistent left superior vena cava may make it difficult to achieve proper venous drainage or delivery of retrograde cardioplegia. Management of a persistent left superior vena cava during CPB depends on factors such as the size and drainage site of the vena cava variation.

Cerebral perfusion, brain blood circulation, always has to be under consideration when using CPB. Due to the nature of CPB and its impact on circulation, the body's own cerebral autoregulation is affected. The occurrence and attempts of preventing this issue has been addressed many times, but still without complete understanding.

== Risks and complications ==
Potential complications of cardiopulmonary bypass
Complication	Incidence (events/1000)	Death or serious injury (%)
Protamine reaction	1.3	10.5
Thrombosis	0.3–0.4	2.6–5.2
Aortic dissection	0.4–0.8	14.3–33.1
Gas embolism	0.2–1.3	0.2–8.7
Massive systemic gas embolism	0.03–0.07	50–52
Dislodging of cannula (causing massive bleeding)	0.2–1.6	4.2–7.1
Acute respiratory distress syndrome	–	–
Arrhythmias	–	–
Capillary leak syndrome	–	–
Hemolysis	–	–
Postperfusion syndrome ("pumphead")	–	–

CPB is not without risk, and there are a number of associated problems. As a consequence, CPB is only used during the several hours a cardiac surgery may take. CPB is known to activate the coagulation cascade and stimulate inflammatory mediators, leading to hemolysis and coagulopathies. This problem worsens as complement proteins build on the membrane oxygenators. For this reason, most oxygenators come with a manufacturer's recommendation that they are only used for a maximum of six hours, although they are sometimes used for up to ten hours, with care being taken to ensure they do not clot off and stop working. For longer periods than this, a membrane oxygenator is used, which can be in operation for up to 31 days — such as in a Taiwanese case, for 16 days, after which the patient received a heart transplant.

The most common complication associated with CPB is a protamine reaction during anticoagulation reversal. There are three types of protamine reactions, and each may cause life-threatening hypotension (type I), anaphylaxis (type II), or pulmonary hypertension (type III). Patients with prior exposure to protamine, such as those who have had a previous vasectomy (protamine is contained in sperm) or diabetics (protamine is contained in neutral protamine hagedorn (NPH) insulin formulations), are at an increased risk of type II protamine reactions due to cross-sensitivity. Because protamine is a fast-acting drug, it is typically given slowly to allow for monitoring of possible reactions. The first step in management of a protamine reaction is to immediately stop the protamine infusion. Corticosteroids are used for all types of protamine reactions. Chlorphenamine is used for type II (anaphylactic) reactions. For type III reactions, heparin is redosed and the patient may need to go back on bypass.

CPB may contribute to immediate cognitive decline. The heart-lung blood circulation system and the connection surgery itself release a variety of debris into the bloodstream, including bits of blood cells, tubing, and plaque. For example, when surgeons clamp and connect the aorta to tubing, resulting emboli may block blood flow and cause mini strokes. Other heart surgery factors related to mental damage may be events of hypoxia, high or low body temperature, abnormal blood pressure, irregular heart rhythms, and fever after surgery.

== Components ==
Cardiopulmonary bypass devices consist of two main functional units: the pump and the oxygenator. These units remove oxygen-depleted blood from a patient's body and replace it with oxygen-rich blood through a series of tubes, or hoses. Additionally, a heat exchanger is used to control body temperature by heating or cooling the blood in the circuit. All components of the circuit are coated internally by heparin or another anticoagulant to prevent clotting within the circuit.

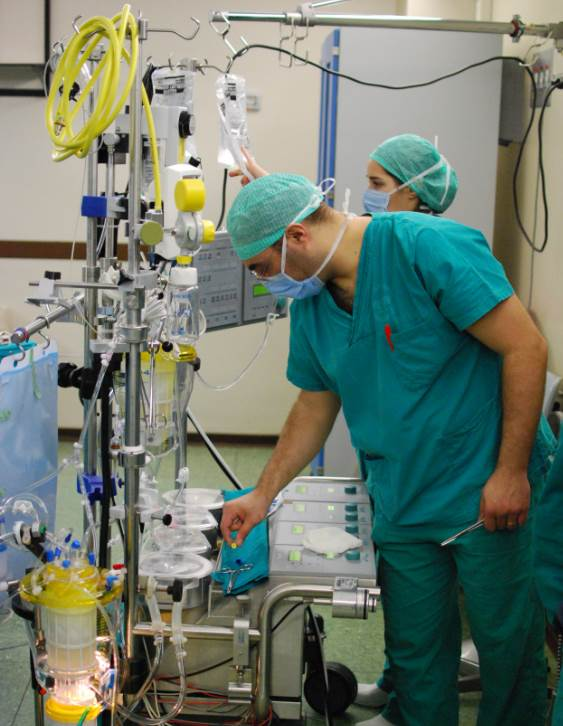
Perfusionist operating a modern heart lung machine

=== Tubing ===
The components of the CPB circuit are interconnected by a series of tubes made of silicone rubber or PVC.

=== Pumps ===
==== Centrifugal pump ====
Many CPB circuits now employ a centrifugal pump for the maintenance and control of blood flow during CPB. By altering the speed of revolution (RPM) of the pump head, blood flow is produced by centrifugal force. This type of pumping action is considered to be superior to the roller pump because it is thought to prevent over-pressurization, clamping, or kinking of lines, and causes less damage to blood products (hemolysis, etc.).

==== Roller pump ====
The pump console usually comprises several rotating, motor-driven pumps that peristaltically "massage" the tubing. This action gently propels the blood through the tubing. This is commonly referred to as a roller pump, or peristaltic pump. The pumps are more affordable than their centrifugal counterparts but are susceptible to over-pressurization if the lines become clamped or kinked. They are also more likely to cause a massive air embolism and require constant, close supervision by the perfusionist.

=== Oxygenator ===
The oxygenator is designed to add oxygen to infused blood and remove some carbon dioxide from the venous blood.

=== Heat exchangers ===
Because hypothermia is frequently used in CPB (to reduce metabolic demands), heat exchangers are implemented to warm and cool blood within the circuit. Heating and cooling is accomplished by passing the line through a warm or ice water bath, and a separate heat exchanger is required for the cardioplegia line.

=== Cannulae ===
Multiple cannulae are sewn into the patient's body in a variety of locations, depending on the type of surgery. A venous cannula removes oxygen depleted venous blood from a patient's body, and an arterial cannula infuses oxygen-rich blood into the arterial system. The main determinants of cannula size selection is determined by the patient's size and weight, anticipated flow rate, and the size of the vessel being cannulated. A cardioplegia cannula delivers a cardioplegia solution to cause the heart to stop beating.

Some commonly used cannulation sites:

Venous	Arterial	Cardioplegia
Right atrium	Proximal aorta, distal to the cross-clamp	Proximal aorta, proximal to the cross-clamp
Vena cavae	Femoral artery	Coronary sinus (retrograde delivery)
Femoral vein	Axillary artery	Coronary ostia
	Distal aorta	Bypass grafts (during CABG)
	Apex of the heart	

=== Cardioplegia ===
Cardioplegia is a fluid solution used to protect the heart during CPB. It is delivered via a cannula to the opening of the coronary arteries (usually by way of the aortic root) and/or to the cardiac veins (by way of the coronary sinus). These delivery methods are referred to antegrade or retrograde, respectively. Cardioplegia solution protects the heart by arresting, or stopping the heart. This then decreases the heart's metabolic demand. There are multiple types of cardioplegia solutions, but most work by inhibiting fast sodium currents in the heart, which prevent conduction of the action potential. Other types of solutions act by inhibiting calcium's actions on myocytes.

== Technique ==
=== Pre-operative planning ===
CPB requires significant forethought before surgery. In particular, the cannulation, cooling, and cardio-protective strategies must be coordinated between the surgeon, anesthesiologist, perfusionist, and nursing staff.

==== Cannulation strategy ====
The cannulation strategy varies on several operation-specific and patient-specific details. Nonetheless, a surgeon will place a cannula in the right atrium, vena cava, or femoral vein to withdraw blood from the body. The cannula used to return oxygenated blood is usually inserted in the ascending aorta, but there is a possibility that it is inserted in the femoral artery, axillary artery, or brachiocephalic artery according to the demand of the surgery. After the cannula is inserted, venous blood is drained from the body by the cannula into a reservoir. This blood is then filtered, cooled, or warmed, and oxygenated before it returns to the body through a mechanical pump.

==== Intra-operative technique ====
A CPB circuit must be primed with fluid and all air expunged from the arterial line/cannula before connection to the patient. The circuit is primed with a crystalloid solution and sometimes blood products are also added (such as in retrograde autologous priming). Prior to cannulation (typically after opening the pericardium when using central cannulation), heparin or another anticoagulant is administered until the activated clotting time is above 480 seconds.

The arterial cannulation site is inspected for calcification or other disease. Preoperative imaging or an ultrasound probe may be used to help identify aortic calcifications that could potentially become dislodged and cause an occlusion or stroke. Once the cannulation site has been deemed safe, two concentric, diamond-shaped pursestring sutures are placed in the distal ascending aorta. A stab incision with a scalpel is made within the pursestrings and the arterial cannula is passed through the incision. It is important the cannula is passed perpendicular to the aorta to avoid creating an aortic dissection. The pursestrings sutures are cinched around the cannula using a tourniquet and secured to the cannula. At this point, the perfusionist advances the arterial line of the CPB circuit and the surgeon connects the arterial line coming from the patient to the arterial line coming from the CPB machine. Care must be taken to ensure no air is in the circuit when the two are connected, or else the patient could develop an air embolism. Other sites for arterial cannulation include the axillary artery, brachiocephalic artery, or femoral artery.

Aside from the differences in location, venous cannulation is performed similarly to arterial cannulation. Since calcification of the venous system is less common, the inspection or use of an ultrasound for calcification at the cannulation sites is unnecessary. Also, because the venous system is under much less pressure than the arterial system, only a single suture is required to hold the cannula in place. If only a single cannula is to be used (dual-stage cannulation), it is passed through the right atrial appendage, through the tricuspid valve, and into the inferior vena cava. If two cannula are required (single-stage cannulation), the first one is typically passed through the superior vena cava and the second through the inferior vena cava. The femoral vein may also be cannulated in select patients.

If the heart must be stopped for the operation, cardioplegia cannulas are also required. Antegrade cardioplegia (forward flowing, through the heart's arteries), retrograde cardioplegia (backwards flowing, through the heart's veins), or both types may be used depending on the operation and surgeon preference. For antegrade cardioplegia, a small incision is made in the aorta proximal to the arterial cannulation site (between the heart and arterial cannulation site) and the cannula is placed through this to deliver cardioplegia to the coronary arteries. For retrograde cardioplegia, an incision is made on the posterior (back) surface of the heart through the right ventricle. The cannula is placed in this incision, passed through the tricuspid valve, and into the coronary sinus. The cardioplegia lines are connected to the CPB machine.

At this point, the patient is ready to go on bypass. Blood from the venous cannula(s) enters the CPB machine by gravity where it is oxygenated and cooled (if necessary) before returning to the body through the arterial cannula. Cardioplegia can now be administered to stop the heart, and a cross-clamp is placed across the aorta between the arterial cannula and cardioplegia cannula to prevent the arterial blood from flowing backwards into the heart. Setting appropriate blood pressure targets to maintain the health and function of the organs including the brain and kidney are important considerations.

Once the patient is ready to come off of bypass support, the cross-clamp and cannulas are removed and protamine sulfate is administered to reverse the anticoagulative effects of heparin.

== History ==
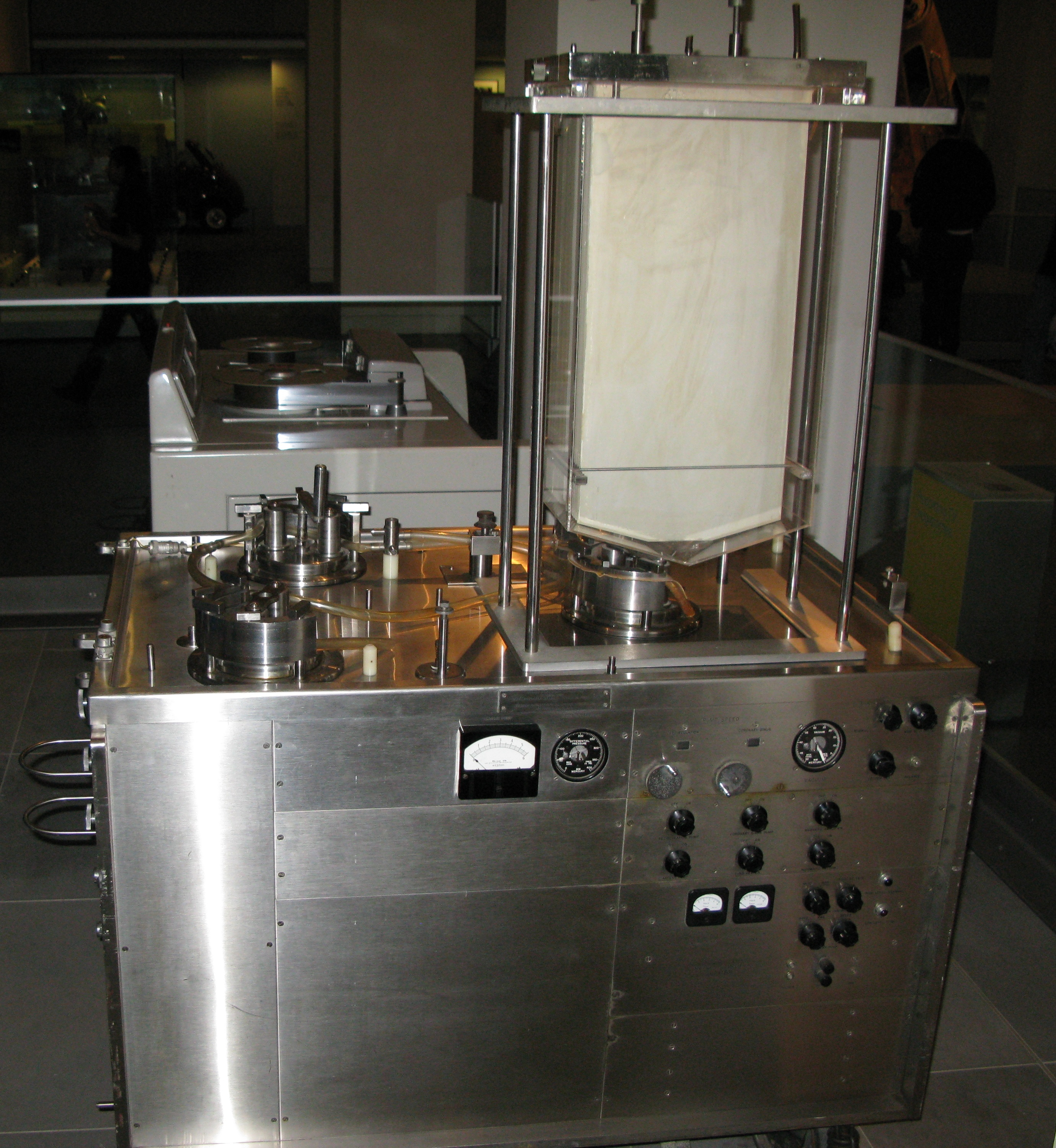
A heart lung machine used in London's Middlesex Hospital in 1958. Science Museum, London (2008)

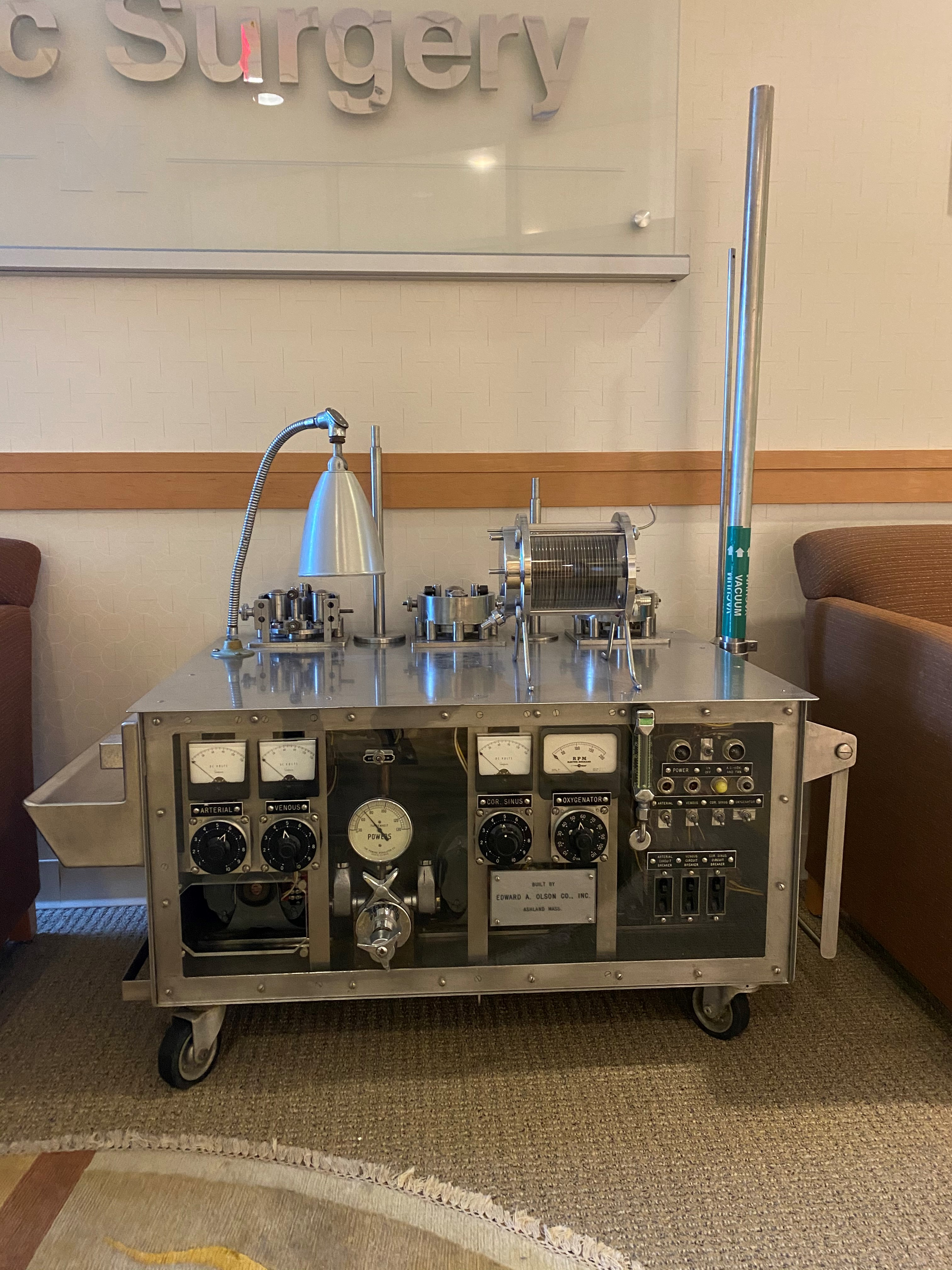
Cardiopulmonary bypass machine used at the University of Michigan in the 1960s.

The Austrian-German physiologist Maximilian von Frey constructed an early prototype of a heart-lung machine in 1885. This was conducted at Carl Ludwig's Physiological Institute of the University of Leipzig. However, such machines were not feasible before the discovery of heparin in 1916, which prevents blood coagulation.

The Soviet scientist Sergei Brukhonenko developed a heart-lung machine for total body perfusion in 1926 named the Autojektor, which was used in experiments with dogs, some of which were showcased in the 1940 film Experiments in the Revival of Organisms. A team of scientists at the University of Birmingham (including Eric Charles, a chemical engineer) were among the pioneers of this technology.

For four years work was undertaken to improve the machine, and on April 5, 1951, Dr. Clarence Dennis led the team at the University of Minnesota Medical Center that conducted the first human operation involving open cardiotomy with temporary mechanical takeover of both heart and lung functions. The patient did not survive due to an unexpected complex congenital heart defect, but the machine had proved to be workable. One member of the team was Dr Russell M. Nelson, (who later became president of The Church of Jesus Christ of Latter-day Saints), who performed the first successful open heart surgery in Utah on November 9, 1955 at Salt Lake General Hospital.

The first successful mechanical support of left ventricular function was performed on July 3, 1952, by Forest Dewey Dodrill using a machine co-developed with General Motors, the Dodrill-GMR. The machine was later used to support the right ventricular function.

The first successful open heart procedure on a human utilizing the heart lung machine was performed by John Gibbon and Frank F. Allbritten Jr. on May 6, 1953, at Thomas Jefferson University Hospital in Philadelphia. Gibbon's machine was further developed into a reliable instrument by a surgical team led by John W. Kirklin at the Mayo Clinic in Rochester, Minnesota in the mid-1950s.

The oxygenator was first conceptualized in the 17th century by Robert Hooke and developed into practical extracorporeal oxygenators by French and German experimental physiologists in the 19th century. Bubble oxygenators have no intervening barrier between blood and oxygen, these are called 'direct contact' oxygenators. Membrane oxygenators introduce a gas-permeable membrane between blood and oxygen that decreases the blood trauma of direct-contact oxygenators. Much work since the 1960s focused on overcoming the gas exchange handicap of the membrane barrier, leading to the development of high-performance microporous hollow-fibre oxygenators that eventually replaced direct-contact oxygenators in cardiac theatres.

In 1983, Ken Litzie patented a closed emergency heart bypass system which reduced circuit and component complexity. This device improved patient survival after cardiac arrest because it could be rapidly deployed in non-surgical settings.
