= Marjan Jahangiri =

Iran academic

Marjan Jahangiri FRCS, FRCS (CTh)
- Education: University College London
- Medical career
- Profession: Surgeon
- Field: Cardiac surgery
- Institutions: St. George's Hospital, London
- Website: marjanjahangiri.co.uk

Marjan Jahangiri FRCS, FRCS (CTh) is Professor of Cardiac Surgery at St. George's Hospital, University of London. She was the first woman to be appointed professor of cardiac surgery in the United Kingdom and Europe.

== Early life ==
Jahangiri was the first woman to be appointed Professor of Cardiac Surgery in the United Kingdom and Europe, receiving her MBBS from UCL in 1988.

== Career ==
Jahangiri graduated in medicine from University College Hospital, London and then completed her general surgical training at University College London and affiliated hospitals. She trained at the London Chest, St Bartholomew's and the Royal Brompton Hospitals in London. She was awarded a research fellowship at the William Harvey Laboratories at St. Bartholomew's Hospital and Medical School.

She then subspecialized in paediatric and adult congenital surgery at Great Ormond Street Hospital and Children's Hospital in Boston, Harvard University. She was appointed Consultant Cardiac Surgeon and Senior Lecturer in 2001 at St. George's Hospital, University of London and then appointed Professor of Cardiac Surgery at University of London in 2007.

She has been the author of more than 250 peer-reviewed publications, and has supervised more than 25 research fellows in their PhDs and master's degrees.

In 2018 she was suspended by her employers pending an "investigation into very serious issues raised". Jahangari took her employers to the high court where the suspension order was lifted. The hospital in time issued a joint statement with Jahangiri which contained an apology. A new person was brought in to lead the department.

Jahangiri has been in charge of the London Training Programme for Cardiothoracic Surgery and in 2019 was appointed Chair of the Specialty Advisory Committee of the Surgical Royal Colleges. She has received several awards for surgical training, as well as the BMJ Clinical Leadership Team Award in 2018.

== Research and selected publications ==
- Jahangiri M Invited Commentary: "Does early postoperative atrial fibrillation cost 6 months of life expectancy?" The Journal of Thoracic and Cardiovascular Surgery. 2026 Jun 15:S0022-5223(26)01076-7.
- EACTS Expert Consensus Statement on the Ross Procedure in Adult Patients. EACTS Scientific Document group. European Journal of Cardio-Thoracic Surgery 2026 Feb 5;68.
- Pratz F, Borger M ...Jahangiri M, ...ESC/EACTS Scientific Document Group "2025 ESC/EACTS Guidelines for the management of valvular heart disease: Developed by the task force for the management of valvular heart disease of the European Society of Cardiology (ESC) and the European Association for Cardio-Thoracic Surgery (EACTS)" European Society of Cardiology.
- Mani K, de Laurentis E, Naruka V, Morgan R, Jahangiri M "Incidence and risk factors for permanent pacemaker implantation following aortic root surgery". Open Heart (journal) July 2026. DOI:10.1136/openhrt-2026-003984
- Jahangiri M. "Which Life Is More Important?" The Annals of Thoracic Surgery. 2026;12:1505
- Jahangiri M, Thilaganathan B "Is Cardiac Surgery Safe During Pregnancy?" The Annals of Thoracic Surgery. 2025;119:509-512.
- Jahangiri M, Prendergast B. "Invited Review: Management of bicuspid aortic valve in disease in the transcatheter aortic valve implantation era". Heart Journal. 2024 Oct 28;110:1291-1297.
- Grant M, Crisafi C, Alvarez A, Arora R, Brindle M, Chatterjee S et al., Jahangiri M. "Perioperative Care in Cardiac Surgery: A Joint Consensus Statement by the Enhanced Recovery After Surgery (ERAS) Cardiac Society, ERAS International Society, and The Society of Thoracic Surgeons (STS)", The Annals of Thoracic Surgery: August 2024: 669–689
- Jahangiri M, Garbi M, Ellery J, Briffa N. "Universal adoption of TAVI to intermediate/low risk and younger patients with aortic valve disease? A word of caution and call to action" SCTS Bulletin {Ahead of publication}
- Jahangiri M. "Redo Surgical Aortic Valve Replacement in the ERA of Transcatheter Aortic Valve replacement". The Annals of Thoracic Surgery, 2023 116:767
- Mani M, Lutman J, Nowell J, Carrol A, Jahangiri M. "Patients expectation of postoperative course and satisfaction following cardiac surgery". Innovation, Annals of the Royal College of Surgeons of England 2023;105:20-27
- Duregotti E, Reumiller C, Mayr U, Hasman M, Schmidt L, Viviano A, Jahangiri M, Mayr M. "Reduced secretion of neuronal growth regulator 1 contributes to impaired adipose-neuronal crosstalk in obesity" Nature Communications 2022;13:7269
- Jahangiri M, Mani K,Acharya M, Bilkhu R, Quinton P, Schroeder F, Morgan R, Edsell M. Early and Long-term Outcomes of Conventional and Valve-Sparing Aortic Root Replacement. Heart Journal 2022;10: 1136.
- Jahangiri M, Mani K, Nowell J. "Does minimally invasive coronary artery surgery have prognostic and cost benefits?" The Annals of Thoracic Surgery 2022;114;609-610
- Jahangiri M, Bilkhu R, Mani K, et al. "Early and long-term outcomes of conventional and valve-sparing aortic root replacement" Heart Journal 2022; 108: 1830-1838 Accompanied editorial by Tirone David
- Jahangiri M. "Self-expanding Transcatheter vs Surgical Aortic Valve Replacement in Intermediate-Risk Patients: 5-Year Outcomes of the SURTAVI Randomized Clinical Trial" JAMA Cardiology 2022;7:1000-1008. Invited Commentary
- Jahangiri M, R Bilkhu, A Embleton-Thirsk, HM Dehbi... – BMJ open, 2021.

"Surgical aortic valve replacement in the era of transcatheter aortic valve implantation: a review of the UK national database"

- Jahangiri M, Hyde J, Sadler P, Tsui S. "Training in cardiothoracic surgery. How far is the other side of the table?" The Bulletin of The Royal College of Surgeons 2021;103:68-71.
- Jahangiri M, Mani K, Yates MT, Nowell "The EXCEL Trial: The Surgeons’ Perspective". European Heart Journal 2020;15. doi: 10.15420/ecr.2020.34.
- Jayakumar S, Khoynezhad A, Jahangiri M. "Surgical Site Infections in Cardiac Surgery". Critical Care Clinics. 2020 Oct;36(4):581-592.
- Jahangiri M, Mani K, Yates M, Nowell J. "The EXCEL trial: the surgeons perspective". European Cardiology Review 2020;15:e67-74 (invited review).
- Bilkhu R, Tome M, Marciniak A, Edsell M, Jahangiri M. "Does the aortic annulus dilate following aortic remodelling?" The Annals of Thoracic Surgery 2020;110:943-947.
- Edlin J, Youssefi P, Figueroa CA, Morgan R, Nowell J, Jahangiri M. "Haemodynamic assessment of bicuspid aortic valve aortopathy: a systematic review of the current literature" European Journal of Cardio-Thoracic Surgery, 2019;55: 610–617.
- Acharya M, Youssefi P, Soppa G, Valencia O, Nowell J, Kanagasaby R, Edsell M, Morgan R, Tome M, Jahangiri M. "Corrigendum to: Analysis of aortic area/height ratio in patients with thoracic aortic aneurysm and Type A dissection" European Journal of Cardio-Thoracic Surgery, 2018;1;794.
- Diab M, Bilkhu R, Soppa G, Edsell M, Fletcher N, Heinerg J, Roysw C, Jahangiri M. "The influence of prolonged intensive care stay on quality of life, recovery and clinical outcomes following cardiac surgery: A prospective cohort study" Journal of Thoracic and Cardiovascular Surgery, 2018;156:1906–1915.
- Bilkhu R, Youssefi P, Soppa G, Theodoropoulos P, Phillips S, Liban b, Child A, Tome M, Nowell J, Sharma R, Edsell M, Jahangiri M. "Fate of Aortic Arch Following Surgery on Aortic Root and Ascending Aorta in Bicuspid Aortic Valve" Annals of Thoracic Surgery, 2018; 106: 771–776
- "Dilatation of the remaining aorta after aortic valve or aortic root replacement in patients with bicuspid aortic valve: a 5-year follow-up" Abdulkareem N., Soppa G., Jones S., Valencia O., Smelt J., Jahangiri M. Annals of Thoracic Surgery 2013;96: 43–9.
- "Left ventricular remodeling after transcatheter aortic valve implantation: one-year follow-up study" Zakkar M., Alassar A., Lopez-Perez M., Roy D., Brecker S., Sharma R., Jahangiri M. Innovations, 2015;44-7.
- "Incidence and mechanisms of cerebral ischemia after transcatheter aortic valve implantation compared with surgical aortic valve replacement" Alassar A., Soppa G., Edsell M., Rich P., Roy D., Chis Ster I., Joyce R., Valencia O., Barrick T., Howe F., Moat N., Morris R., Markus H.S., Jahangiri M. Annals of Thoracic Surgery, 2015;99: 802–8.
- "Perioperative management and outcomes of aortic surgery during pregnancy" Yates M.T., Soppa G., Smelt J., Fletcher N., van Besouw J.P., Thilaganathan B., Jahangiri M.J. Journal of Thoracic and Cardiovascular Surgery, 2015;149: 607–10.
- "Aortic root surgery: Does high surgical volume and a consistent perioperative approach improve outcome?" Bilkhu R., Youssefi P., Soppa G., Sharma R., Child A., Edsell M., van Besouw J.P., Jahangiri M. Semin Journal of Thoracic and Cardiovascular Surgery, 2016;28: 302–309.
- "Functional assessment of thoracic aortic aneurysm – the future of risk prediction" Youssefi P., Sharma R., Figueroa C.A., Jahangiri M. British Medical Bulletin, 2016.
- "Patients-specific computational dynamics-assessment of aortic hemodynamics in a spectrum of aortic valve pathologies" Youssefi P., Gomez A., He T., Anderson L., Bunce N., Sharma R., Figueroa C.A., Jahangiri M.J. Journal of Thoracic and Cardiovascular Surgery, 2017;153: 8–20.

== Awards and honours ==
She was elected as a member of the American Association for Thoracic Surgery. In 2018 she was awarded the BMJ Clinical Leadership Team. She is the associated editor and regular reviewer for several academic journals Annals of Thoracic Surgery.
