= John Puskas =

American cardiac surgeon and inventor

John D. Puskas
- Citizenship: United States
- Education: Princeton University Harvard Medical School Massachusetts General Hospital Toronto General Hospital Emory University
- Occupations: Cardiovascular surgeon, researcher, educator
- Medical career
- Profession: Surgeon
- Institutions: Icahn School of Medicine at Mount Sinai
- Research: Robotic and hybrid coronary bypass grafting, mitral valve repair, Atrial Fibrillation, novel artificial heart valves, arterial bypass grafting
- Website: https://www.mountsinai.org/profiles/john-d-puskas

John D. Puskas is an American researcher, author, inventor and cardiovascular surgeon. As of 2022, he is Professor, Cardiovascular Surgery, Icahn School of Medicine at Mount Sinai, and chairman, Department of Cardiovascular Surgery at Mount Sinai Morningside, Mount Sinai Beth Israel and Mount Sinai West. He holds 11 U.S. patents and co-founded the International Coronary Congress and the International Society for Coronary Artery Surgery. He is credited by ResearchGate with 330 publications and 15,234 citations and as of 2022 Scopus reports an h-index of 62. Puskas is known for advancing coronary artery bypass (CABG) surgery by refining surgical techniques for all-arterial, off-pump CABG and inventing finer instruments to be used for advanced coronary bypass surgical procedures. He is credited with performing the first totally thoracoscopic bilateral pulmonary vein isolation procedure. He is the co-editor of State of the Art Surgical Coronary Revascularization, the first textbook solely devoted to coronary artery surgery.

In 2021, Puskas ran the New York City Marathon with his patient who, in 2018, suffered cardiac arrest and was clinically dead for five minutes, but recovered after all-arterial CABG. Their trainer, John Garlepp was another CABG patient of Puskas.

== Career ==
=== Life and education ===
Born in 1960, Puskas received his MD at Harvard Medical School in 1986 and in 1991, a Master of Science in Surgical Science (MSc) at the University of Toronto. Post-graduate training included a general surgery internship and residency, department of surgery, Massachusetts General Hospital; fellowship in cardiothoracic surgery at Emory University Hospitals, Atlanta, a lung transplantation research fellowship, division of thoracic surgery, Toronto General Hospital; and an advanced fellowship in tracheal surgery, Massachusetts General Hospital, Division of General Thoracic Surgery.

=== Research ===
Puskas research concentrations include arterial bypass grafting, robotic and hybrid coronary bypass grafting, novel designs and materials for artificial heart valves, mitral and aortic valve repair and replacement, surgical and medical treatments for people with atrial fibrillation and surgical instruments for adult cardiac surgery.

He founded the Emory University Cardiothoracic Clinical Research Unit in 2005 and was a founding investigator in the creation of the NIH Cardiothoracic Surgery Trials Network in 2007; he has served on the steering committee of that NIH Network since that time. As of 2022, he has served as the principal investigator (PI) of five multi-center FDA investigatory drug/device exemption trials in cardiovascular surgery. At Mount Sinai Health System, he founded and directs the Cardiovascular Clinical Research Unit at Mount Sinai Morningside and Mount Sinai Beth Israel Hospitals to create a multidisciplinary collaborative clinical research infrastructure allowing clinical cardiologists and surgeons to enroll patients in multiple trials. He led 47 clinical sites nationwide to conduct the first RCT of hybrid coronary revascularization. He is listed on NIH RePORTER with 12 NHLBI PI roles.

=== Clinical and practice ===
Puskas performs cardiovascular surgical procedures including all-arterial coronary bypass grafting, minimally invasive robotic coronary bypass surgery, hybrid coronary revascularization, off-pump coronary artery bypass surgery, ablation surgery for the treatment of atrial fibrillation, mitral valve repair/replacement, aortic valve replacement, valve-sparing aortic root replacement and surgery for aortic dissection. He performed the first triple off-pump bypass surgery using minimally invasive coronary artery bypass graft instrumentation in 1997. Between 1996 and 2022, he performed approximately 300 cardiac surgical cases annually, specializing in multiple arterial CABG and robotic CABG. In 2019, Puskas, with Gianluca Torregrossa, MD, successfully performed two totally endoscopic coronary arterial bypass surgeries (TECABs) making Mount Sinai the only New York State health system qualified to make the procedure available. As of 2022, Puskas has served as President of the International Society for Minimally Invasive Cardiothoracic Surgery (2009) and the International Society for Coronary Artery Surgery.

=== U.S. patents ===
Specifications
Patent No	Title	Licensed to
6,042,538	Device for Endoscopic Vessel Harvesting	Medtronic
6,479,523	Pharmacological Drug Combination in Vagal-Induced Asystole	Medtronic
6,429,217	Pharmacological Drug Combination in Vagal-Induced Asystole	Medtronic
6,778,854	Methods of Indirectly Stimulating the Vagus nerve with an Electrical Field	Medtronic
6,656,960	Methods of Performing Vagal-Induced Asystol	Medtronic
7,072,720	Devices and Methods for Vagus Nerve Stimulation	Medtronic
7,142,910	Methods of Indirectly Stimulating the Vagus Nerve with an Electrical Field	Medtronic
7,310,552	Apparatus for Indirectly Stimulating the Vagus Nerve with an Electrical Field	
7,340,299	Methods of Indirectly Stimulating the Vagus Nerve to Achieve Controlled Asystole	
7,840,278	Devices and Methods for Vagus Nerve Stimulation	
12/134,842	Dual Closing Guide for a Surgical Instrument	Scanlan International, Inc.
14/030,606	Novel Sternal Retractor	Scanlan International, Inc.

=== Present societies ===
- International Society for Minimally Invasive Cardiothoracic Surgery (ISMICS)
- Society of Thoracic Surgeons
- American College of Surgeons
- American Association for Thoracic Surgery
- American College of Chest Physicians
- American College of Cardiology

*Present indicates 2022

== Publications ==
=== Editorial ===
As of 2022, Puskas is a reviewer and editorial contributor to nine journals, including The Annals of Thoracic Surgery, Journal of Thoracic and Cardiovascular Surgery, Heart Surgery Forum, The Lancet, The Journal of Cardiac Surgery, Circulation, Innovations, American College of Cardiology, European Association for Cardiothoracic Surgery.

=== Peer reviewed ===
PubMed lists 320 publications as of 2022. A short list ranked by citations include:

Smith, P. K., Puskas, J. D., Ascheim, D. D., Voisine, P., Gelijns, A. C., Moskowitz, A. J., ... & Michler, R. E. (2014). Surgical treatment of moderate ischemic mitral regurgitation. New England Journal of Medicine, 371(23), 2178–2188; 273 citations

Puskas, J. D., Thourani, V. H., Marshall, J. J., Dempsey, S. J., Steiner, M. A., Sammons, B. H., ... & Guyton, R. A. (2001). Clinical outcomes, angiographic patency, and resource utilization in 200 consecutive off-pump coronary bypass patients. The Annals of thoracic surgery, 71(5), 1477–1484; 324 citations

Gaudino, M., Benedetto, U., Fremes, S., Biondi-Zoccai, G., Sedrakyan, A., Puskas, J. D., ... & Taggart, D. P. (2018). Radial-artery or saphenous-vein grafts in coronary-artery bypass surgery. New England Journal of Medicine, 378(22), 2069–2077; 295 citations

Gillinov, A. M., Gelijns, A. C., Parides, M. K., DeRose Jr, J. J., Moskowitz, A. J., Voisine, P., ... & Argenziano, M. (2015). Surgical ablation of atrial fibrillation during mitral-valve surgery. New England Journal of Medicine, 372(15), 1399–1409; 261 citations

El-Chami, M. F., Kilgo, P., Thourani, V., Lattouf, O. M., Delurgio, D. B., Guyton, R. A., ... & Puskas, J. D. (2010). New-onset atrial fibrillation predicts long-term mortality after coronary artery bypass graft. Journal of the American College of Cardiology, 55(13), 1370–1376; 338 citations

=== Books and chapters ===
State of the Art Surgical Coronary Revascularization. ISBN 0198758782

Winston AD and Puskas JD. "Techniques for Multivessel OPCAB". Minimally Invasive Cardiac Surgery. 2ndEdition, edited by Oz MC and Goldstein DJ, Humana Press, 2003.

Sharoni E and Puskas JD. "Techniques in Multivessel OPCAB". Operative Cardiac Surgery, edited by Gardner T J and Spray TL, Arnold Publishers, 2004.

Thourani VH and Puskas JD. "Coronary Artery Bypass Procedures·Medical Management of the Surgical Patient." Fourth Edition, edited by Lubin MF, Walker HK, Smith RB III, 2006.

Song HK and Puskas JD. "Off-pump Coronary Artery Bypass Surgery". Mastery of Cardiothoracic Surgery, 2nd Edition, Lippincott Williams and Wilkins, New York, 2007.

Richard J. Myung and John D. Puskas. "Off-Pump Coronary Artery Bypass Grafting for Repeat Coronary Revascularization", Redo Cardiac Surgery in Adults, 2nd Edition, Edited by Venkat R. Machiraju, Hartzell V. Schaff and Lars G. Svensson. Springer. 2011.

Michael E. Halkos, John D. Puskas. "Minimally Invasive Coronary Artery Bypass Graft to Cardiac Surgery: Recent Advances and Techniques", 2012.

Yanagawa B and Puskas JD. “Off-Pump Coronary Artery Bypass Grafting”, in Mastery of Techniques in Cardiac Surgery, 2016.

Michael E. Halkos, Emmanuel Moss, and John D. Puskas. “Chapter 2 Off-pump versus on-pump coronary artery bypass grafting”, in Core Concepts in Cardiac Surgery, Edited by David Taggart and Yasir Abu-Omar, Oxford University Press, 2018.

Bobby Yanagawa, Michael E. Halkos, John D. Puskas. “Chapter 21: Myocardial Revascularization Without Cardiopulmonary Bypass”, in Cardiac Surgery in the Adult, 5e, Edited by Lawrence H. Cohn, David H. Adams, Cenveo® Publisher Services, 2018.

== See also ==
- Mario Gaudino - cardiac surgeon and expert in coronary revascularization
