= Mario Gaudino =

Italian doctor

Mario F.L. Gaudino
- Citizenship: Italy
- Education: Catholic University of Rome; Weill Cornell Medical Center; Cornell University Medical College; Maastricht University
- Occupation(s): Cardiovascular surgeon, researcher, educator
- Medical career
- Profession: Surgeon
- Institutions: Weill Cornell Medicine
- Research: coronary bypass grafting, aortic surgery, atrial fibrillation
- Website: https://weillcornell.org/mariogaudino

Mario F.L. Gaudino, MD, PhD, MSCE, FEBCTS, FACC, FAHA is an Italian cardiothoracic surgeon who is the Stephen and Suzanne Weiss Professor in Cardiothoracic Surgery (II) and Professor of Clinical Epidemiology and Health Services Research at Weill Cornell Medicine, an attending cardiac surgeon at NewYork-Presbyterian Hospital and Weill Cornell Medical Center, and the current Editor-in-Chief of the European Journal of Cardio-Thoracic Surgery. He is an expert in coronary revascularization and clinical trialist. He is known for conducting the PALACS trial, which demonstrated that posterior pericardiotomy at the time of cardiac surgery reduced the incidence of post-operative atrial fibrillation and pericardial effusion.

== Education ==
Gaudino completed medical school in 1994 graduating cum laude at the Catholic University of Rome and completed his residency in cardiac surgery at the same institution in 1999. During his residency, he completed a research fellowship at the European Homograft Bank in Brussels. Following residency, he completed a clinical fellowship in cardiac surgery at Hospital San Camillo de Lellis in Chieti with Prof. Calafiore. He joined the faculty at the Catholic University of Rome in 2000 as an assistant professor and staff cardiac surgeon. In 2014, he joined Weill Cornell Medical Center as a aortic surgery fellow for 2 years and joined the faculty at Weill Cornell Medical Center in 2016. In 2017, he was promoted to the role of Stephen and Suzanne Weiss Professor in Cardiothoracic Surgery (II). In 2020, he completed both a MS in clinical epidemiology at Weill Cornell Medical College and his PhD at Maastricht University on the topic of the radial artery in CABG. In 2021, he was appointed a Professor of Clinical Epidemiology and Health Services Research at the Weill Cornell Graduate School of Medical Sciences.

== Research ==
Gaudino's research focuses on coronary arterial bypass grafting, aortic and mitral surgery and novel adjunctive procedures in cardiac surgery. He has published over 700 peer-reviewed publications covering clinical research. He is also the Assistant Dean for Clinical Trials, Director for the Joint Clinical Trials Office (JCTO), and the Director of Translational and Clinical Research for the Department of Cardiothoracic Surgery at Weill Cornell Medicine. He has published as first and last author in the New England Journal of Medicine, The Lancet and the Journal of the American Medical Association.

=== Clinical trialist ===
Gaudino is the principal investigator for the upcoming multinational ROMA and ROMA-Women trials investigating multiple arterial grafting in coronary artery bypass grafting. He is also a principal investigator for the upcoming STICH3C trial, comparing coronary artery bypass grafting and percutaneous coronary intervention in patients with low ejection fraction, the ODIN trial, comparing short-term dual antiplatelet therapy to standard of care after coronary artery bypass grafting, the EPIC and PRINCE trials, two multicenter trials evaluating posterior left pericardiotomy to prevent post-operative atrial fibrillation and pericardial effusion after cardiac surgery, and the RECHARGE (Revascularization CHoices Among under-Represented Groups Evaluation) trial, a multicenter trial aiming to compare length of life and quality of life for women and underrepresented minorities with CAD who are treated with PCI compared to CABG.

=== Academic activities ===
He was part of the guideline writing committee for the 2021 ACC/AHA Myocardial Revascularization Guidelines and he is a member of the AHA Joint Committee on Clinical Practices Guidelines. He was the Chair of the Coronary Artery Surgery Task Force of the European Association for Cardio-thoracic Surgery from 2017 to 2023. He is the author of Technical Aspects of Modern Coronary Artery Bypass Surgery, a textbook published in 2020 along with several book chapters published in various texts. Gaudino has been funded by the NIH, PCORI, the CIHR, the British Heart Foundation, and the Austrian Science Fund continuously since 2018. He is the Editor-in-Chief of the European Journal of Cardio-Thoracic Surgery, deputy editor of Journal of Cardiac Surgery, senior editor of Annals of Thoracic Surgery, feature editor of Journal of Thoracic and Cardiovascular Surgery, and senior editor for Journal of the American College of Cardiology. He serves on the editorial board of Journal of Cardiothoracic Surgery. He also serves as the Chair of the Council on Cardiovascular Surgery and Anesthesia CVSA Education and Publications Committee as well as the Chair of the Participant User File (PUF) Review Task Force of the Society of Thoracic Surgeons (Adult Cardiac Subcommittee).

=== Awards and honors ===
Gaudino has been elected as a Fellow of the American College of Cardiology, the American Heart Association and the European Board of Cardiothoracic Surgery. He has been awarded the JACC Simon Dack Award for Outstanding Scholarship in 2020 and 2021, the JTCVS Top Performance Award of the Editorial Board in 2022, and the JACC Elite Reviewer Award in 2024.

== See also ==
- John Puskas - cardiac surgeon at Mount Sinai School of Medicine
