= National Academy of Surgery =

French learned society

The Académie nationale de chirurgie (English: National Academy of Surgery) is a French learned society dedicated to the field of surgery. It is the oldest surgical institution in France having been founded in 1731 as the Académie royale de chirurgie. The current president is Olivier Jardé, a French politician, professor, and orthopaedic trauma surgeon.

== History ==
The academy was founded on 18 December 1731 as the Académie royale de chirurgie by Georges Mareschal, who was the first surgeon of Louis XV, and François La Peyronie, his successor. It was dissolved during the French Revolution and reestablished on 27 August 1843 by several prominent surgeons of the time, including Guillaume Dupuytren, Auguste Nélaton, Jacques Lisfranc de St. Martin, and Jean-Louis Petit, initially under the name Société de chirurgie de Paris. It was later renamed Société nationale de chirurgie in 1875. In 1935, it was renamed again as the Académie de chirurgie before adopting its current name, the Académie nationale de chirurgie, in 1997.

== Aims ==
The Académie nationale de chirurgie consists of full and associate members, honorary members, foreign members, and free members, representing various surgical specialties.

The roles and objectives of the academy is to:

- Uphold moral responsibility in all matters related to surgery
- Act as a guardian of the history of surgery
- Document and analyse the evolution of surgical practices
- Ensure adherence to high standards of surgical ethics
- Conduct careful and rigorous evaluations of the development and changes in surgical techniques
- Define good surgical practice by establishing references, recommendations, and strategies
- Control the conditions under which surgery is practiced
- Evaluate the training and recruitment of surgeons.

== Publications ==
The Académie nationale de chirurgie has been publishing texts since it was established in 1731, making it the oldest publication dedicated to surgery in the world. Since 2002, articles have been available on their website as e-mémoires, and have been accessible through platforms such as the National Library of Medicine, PASCAL, and the Directory of Open Access Journals since 2006. Additionally, since 2012, the academy has been posting videos on their website, which are also available to view on YouTube.
