= Peyronie's disease =

Abnormal growth of scar tissue within the penis

- Other names: Peyronie disease, induratio penis plastica (IPP), chronic inflammation of the tunica albuginea (CITA)
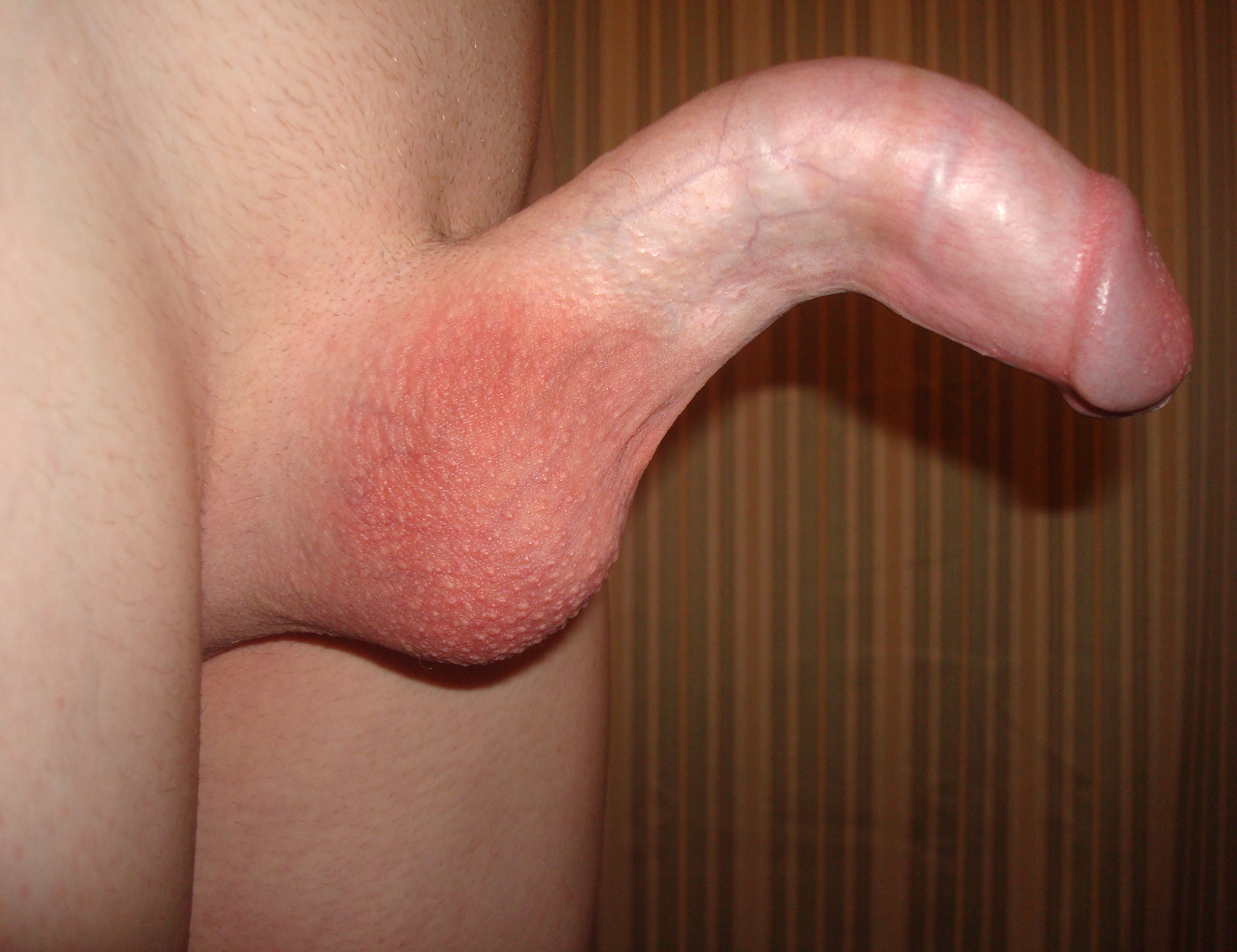
- Abnormal curvature of the penis associated with Peyronie's disease
- Pronunciation: /peɪroʊˈniː/
- Specialty: Urology
- Causes: Unknown
- Frequency: ~10% of men
- Named after: François Gigot de la Peyronie

Peyronie's disease (PD) is a benign, acquired penile connective tissue disease characterized by the occurrence of fibrotic plaques within the tunica albuginea, the dense elastic covering of the corpora cavernosa. The plaques cause abnormal curvature, pain, penile deformities (e.g., narrowing or indentation), and usually erectile dysfunction. The condition typically leads to significant sexual and psychological effects, including difficulty with penetration and lowered self-esteem or evasiveness. Peyronie's disease is most often seen in middle-aged and older men with a median age of onset between 55 and 60 years, however, it has also been reported in adolescents.

While the etiology of Peyronie's disease is still uncertain, the leading hypothesis is that it arises from dysregulated wound healing in response to chronic microtrauma of the erect penis. This triggers a cascade of profibrotic molecular pathways—most notably overexpression of transforming growth factor-beta 1 (TGF-β1)—that end in fibroblast proliferation, myofibroblast differentiation, and overproduction of type I collagen. Genetic predisposition is supported by family clustering and linkage with systemic fibrosing disorders such as Dupuytren's contracture. Risk factors include age, penile injury, diabetes mellitus, and cigarette smoking.

The prevalence of Peyronie's disease has been projected at 1% to 20% among the general population of men increasing with age and comorbidities such as erectile dysfunction (ED) or connective tissue disease. While Peyronie's disease is neither infectious nor malignant, it can have serious negative effects on sexual health and quality of life. It is diagnosed mainly on the clinical presentation supplemented by penile ultrasonography if necessary. Treatment depends on the phase and severity of the disease with conservative measures (e.g., oral therapy, traction, intralesional injection) in the milder and stable forms to surgical intervention for the advanced or stable ones. The condition is named for French surgeon François Gigot de la Peyronie, who in 1743 described the condition.

== Signs and symptoms ==
Example of penis deformation from top

The most frequent sign of Peyronie's disease is penile curvature acquired on erection. The location and extent of curvature vary with the location and extent of the fibrous plaque of the tunica albuginea. Curvature is the most frequent complaint, but some men complain of penile shortening, penile narrowing (hourglass deformity), or indentations. Palpable plaques can be seen along the shaft, most commonly on the dorsum. Pain with erection is common during the initial, inflammatory phase but usually resolves during the chronic phase with resolution of swelling. Erectile dysfunction is estimated to affect 30–70% of men with Peyronie's disease, either due to decreased rigidity secondary to anatomic changes or psychogenic causes like distress and sexual performance anxiety. Peyronie's disease can substantially impair sexual function and quality of life, leading to depression, relationship difficulties, and low self-esteem.

=== Psychosocial ===
Peyronie's disease can also have psychological effects. While most men will continue to be able to have sexual relations, they are likely to experience some degree of erectile dysfunction. It is not uncommon to exhibit depression or withdrawal from their sexual partners. In one study, 81% of men diagnosed with Peyronie's disease reported emotional difficulties. 48% reported clinically meaningful depression. Of those, 26% experienced moderate depression, while 21% experienced severe depression. 54% reported relationship problems due to Peyronie's disease. Peyronie's disease can cause patients to feel socially isolated and stigmatized. Physicians may be unaware of the psychological effects suffered by patients and their partners. Many men with Peyronie's disease avoid intimacy and isolate themselves as they cope with anger, depression, fear of rejection, and decreased self‐worth.

==== Body dysmorphic disorder ====
Men may also suffer from body dysmorphic disorder (BDD), and specifically penile dysmorphic disorder (PDD). In one study, 54% of men with Peyronie's disease overestimated their degree of penile curvature, with 44% of men overestimating their degree of penile curvature by more than 20°. Only 20% of men accurately estimated their degree of curvature within 5°.

Body dysmorphic disorder (BDD) is a condition defined by an overwhelming preoccupation with a perceived flaw in one's physical appearance. Its importance is disproportionately magnified in the mind of the individual. Ruminations concerning this perceived defect become pervasive and intrusive, consuming substantial mental bandwidth for extended periods each day. This excessive preoccupation induces severe emotional distress and also disrupts daily functioning and activities. The DSM-5 places BDD within the obsessive–compulsive spectrum, distinguishing it from disorders such as anorexia nervosa.

Penile dysmorphic disorder (PDD) is a manifestation of body dysmorphic disorder where the main area of fixation is the penis. Individuals with penile dysmorphic disorder typically develop heightened anxiety, shame, and dissatisfaction about their penis. This distorted perception may interfere with daily functioning and relationships. Although penile dysmorphic disorder is not formally classified as a distinct diagnosis, it has become more prominent in clinical studies and discussions around male body image.

== Causes and risk factors ==
The etiology of Peyronie's disease is multifactorial. The most widely held hypothesis is that recurrent microtrauma to the erect penis (e.g., during intercourse) leads to localized inflammation and abnormal wound healing in genetically predisposed men. This pathway initiates a cascade of pro-inflammatory and pro-fibrotic cytokines such as transforming growth factor beta 1 (TGF-β1), resulting in abnormal collagen deposition and plaque formation. Risk factors include advancing age, penile trauma, diabetes mellitus, Dupuytren's contracture, and tobacco smoking. Familial aggregation and linkage with other fibrosing disorders suggest a genetic basis. Peyronie's disease is seen most frequently in men over 40 years of age, with a prevalence in the general male population estimated at between 1% and 20%, and with higher prevalence in those with erectile dysfunction.

== Pathophysiology ==
Peyronie's disease develops in two phases: the acute (inflammatory) and chronic (fibrotic) phase. During the acute phase, microtrauma induces damage to the endothelium, fibrin deposition, and immigration of immune cells into the tunica albuginea. Fibroblast proliferation and myofibroblast differentiation are promoted by cytokines like transforming growth factor beta 1 (TGF-β1), platelet-derived growth factor (PDGF), and reactive oxygen species (ROS). Myofibroblasts overexpress type I collagen and extracellular matrix proteins, leading to plaque formation. In the chronic presentation, inflammation is reduced, but the fibrotic plaque is preserved, and partial calcification occurs in most cases. This causes structural deformity of the penile tissue and inelasticity that impedes normal growth during an erection. Intense calcification and fibrosis impair normal hemodynamics and penile elasticity of the penis, which usually causes venous leakage and erectile failure.

== Diagnosis ==
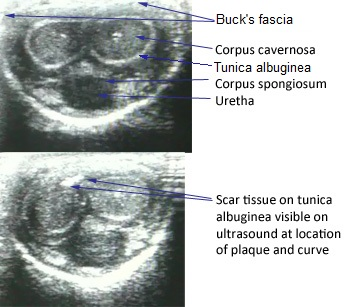
This ultrasound depicts cross sections of the penis at different locations in a patient with Peyronie's disease. The top image shows normal anatomy whereas the bottom image shows scar tissue on the tunica albuginea (penis). The scar tissue is localized and responsible for the hallmark deformities of Peyronie's disease (curvature and narrowing).

Peyronie's disease diagnosis is mostly clinical. Patient history and physical examination are crucial. The most prominent features are acquired penile curvature, palpable plaques, erectile dysfunction, and pain during erections. Penile ultrasonography is the imaging method of choice for plaque location, measurement, and confirmation of calcification. Doppler ultrasound can be utilized to assess vascular function, which is useful in the evaluation of associated erectile dysfunction. Imaging also helps to differentiate Peyronie's disease from congenital penile curvature, penile fracture, or neoplastic disease. MRI can be employed in severe ones, although it is generally not required.

Bent penis due Peyronie's disease

=== Ultrasonography ===
On penile ultrasonography, the typical appearance is hyperechoic focal thickening of the tunica albuginea. Due to associated calcifications, the imaging of patients with Peyronie's disease shows acoustic shadowing, as illustrated in figures below. Less common findings, attributed to earlier stages of the disease (still mild fibrosis), are hypoechoic lesions with focal thickening of the paracavernous tissues, echoic focal thickening of the tunica without posterior acoustic shadowing, retractile isoechoic lesions with posterior attenuation of the beam, and focal loss of the continuity of the tunica albuginea.

In the doppler study, increased flow around the plaques can suggest inflammatory activity and the absence of flow can suggest disease stability. Ultrasound is useful for the identification of lesions and to determine their relationship with the neurovascular bundle. Individuals with Peyronie's disease can present with erectile dysfunction, often related to venous leakage, due to insufficient drainage at the site of the plaque. Although plaques are more common on the dorsum of the penis, they can also be seen on the ventral face, lateral face, or septum.

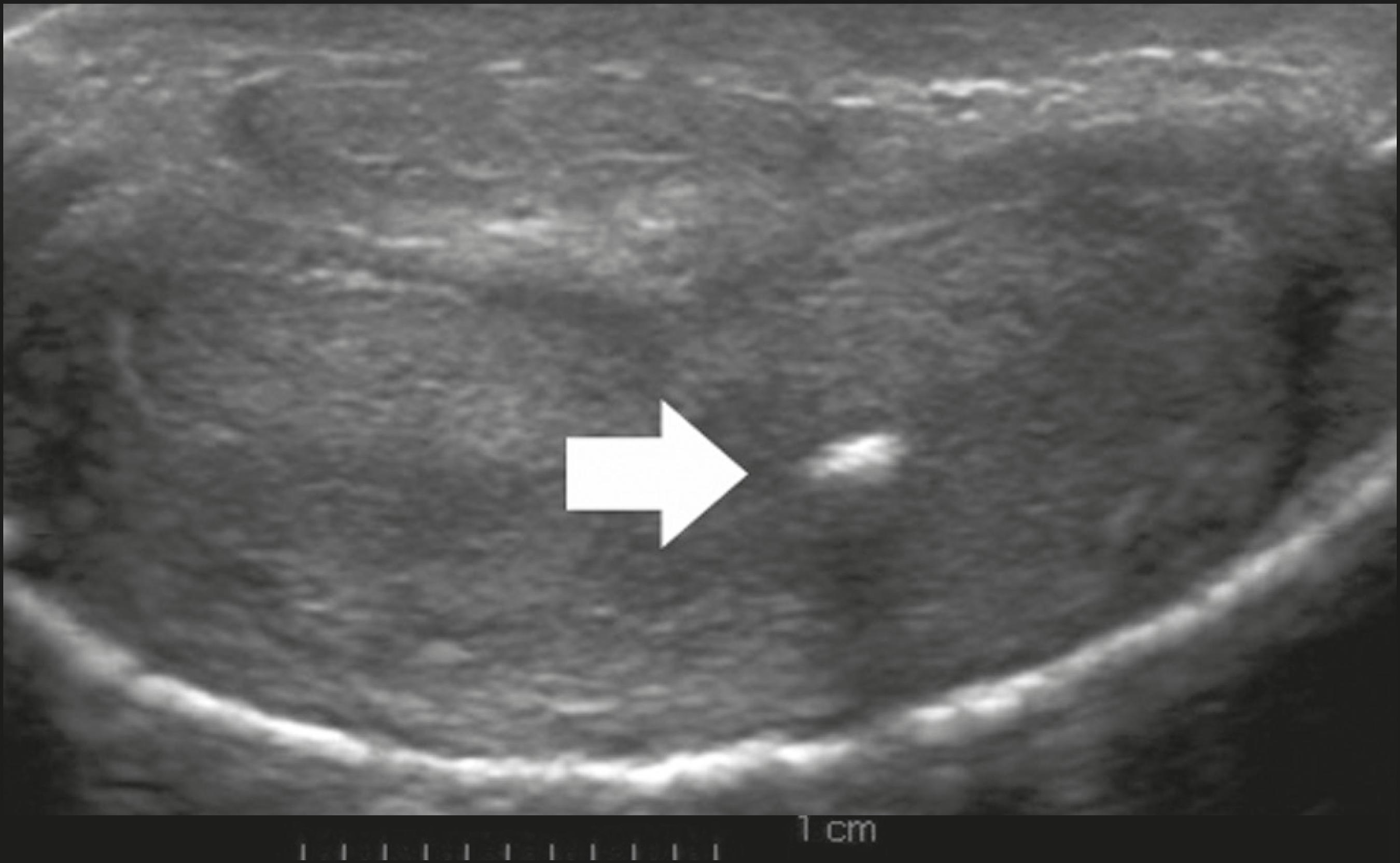
Transverse ultrasound of the penis, in a ventral view, in the middle portion of the penis. Note the echoic image with posterior acoustic shadowing, corresponding to calcification (arrow), in the left corpus cavernosum.

== Management and treatment ==
Peyronie's disease treatment is based on stage of disease, degree of curvature, loss of function, and patient choice. Conservative management in the acute phase has the aim of reducing inflammation and disease extension.

=== Oral therapy ===
The chemical structure of pentoxifylline, an oral medication for Peyronie's disease.

Treatment can be with oral therapy such as pentoxifylline (an anti-fibrotic phosphodiesterase inhibitor). Pentoxifylline lowers inflammation by blocking transforming growth factor beta 1 (TGF-β1), which interferes with the production of collagen type I.

Pain management in the active phase of the disease can be provided by non-steroidal anti-inflammatory drugs (NSAID). One of the main symptoms of active Peyronie's disease is pain with or without erection. Pain is often distressing to patients and may compromise sexual function. Pain level should be periodically checked to measure treatment efficacy.

Not recommended oral therapies include Acetyl-L-carnitine and vitamin E .

=== Traction therapy ===
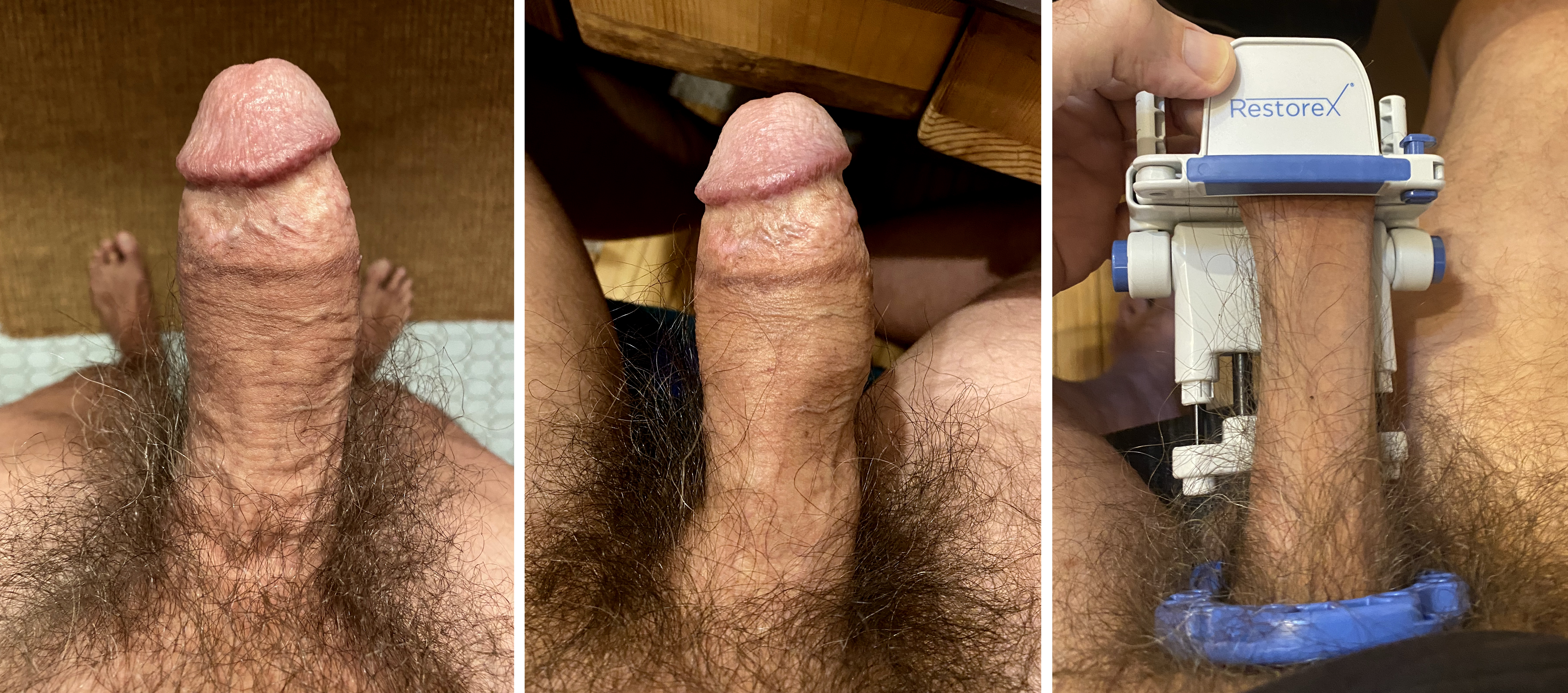
Before (left) and after (middle) onset of Peyronie's disease, causing an indentation near the base on the right side and a decrease in length of 1.3 cm (½ inch). At right, treatment for Peyronie's disease using a traction device.

Mechanical treatments in the form of penile traction therapy (PTT) and vacuum erection devices (VED) are used to correct the curvature due to plaque and preserve length.

=== Intralesional injections ===
Intralesional injection therapy is part of non-surgical therapy, particularly for stable disease. Verapamil and interferon alfa-2b have intermediate efficacy. Collagenase Clostridium histolyticum (CCH), an enzymatic drug approved by the US Food and Drug Administration (FDA), targets plaque collagen and repairs in moderate disease. It is administered in a series of treatment cycles with attendant penile modeling and elongation. Potential side effects include corporal rupture (penile fracture) or other serious penile injury.

=== Surgery ===
Surgical therapy is reserved for fixed patients with severe curvature, or failed medical therapy. Operations include penile plication (shortening the concave portion of the penis), plaque incision or excision with grafting (lengthening the convex portion of the penis), and penile prosthesis implantation in concomitant erectile dysfunction. Reasonable levels of satisfaction after surgery are present, especially with appropriate preoperative counseling.

The "scratch" technique, described by Dr. Paul Perito and Steven K. Wilson in 2013, is an adjunct to manual modeling during penile prosthesis implantation in patients with Peyronie's disease and erectile dysfunction. It involves disrupting the fibrous plaque from within the corpora cavernosa before inserting the prosthesis, with subsequent modeling used to address remaining curvature. A clinical review reported encouraging results when the technique was combined with prosthesis implantation, modeling and postoperative vacuum therapy, but emphasized the need for comparative studies and independent validation.

== Epidemiology ==
Peyronie's disease is estimated to affect 1–20% of men. The condition becomes more common with age. The median age at onset of disease is 55–60 years although many cases have been recorded in adolescence and early 20's.

The overall prevalence of Peyronie's disease is about 1–20% in men. Rates range from 3.2% in a community-based survey of 4,432 men (mean age of sample 57.4) to 16% among 488 men undergoing evaluation for erectile dysfunction (mean age 52.8). The prevalence of Peyronie's disease among the 4,432 men in the community based study who responded by self report positively for palpable plaque, newly occurring angulation or curvature and painful erection was 1.5% between the ages of 30 and 39, 3% between 40 and 49, 3% between 50 and 59, 4% between 60 and 69, and 6.5% over age 70.

In 534 men undergoing routine prostate screening for cancer detection (without a specific urologic complaint), the prevalence of Peyronie's disease was 8.9%. In this study, the mean age of those with Peyronie's disease was 68.2 years compared with 61.8 years of those without Peyronie's disease. Accurately determining the prevalence of Peyronie's disease is difficult due to the embarrassment many patients feel about the condition. The actual prevalence is likely much higher than reported.

=== Penile curves in the general population ===
In a survey of the general population, it was found that although many erect penises point upwards, it is common and normal for the erect penis to point nearly vertically upwards or horizontally straight forward or even nearly vertically downwards, all depending on the tension of the suspensory ligament that holds it in position. 37% of healthy men have a penile curve. With 22.2% of men having upwards curvature and 14.8% of men having downwards curvature.

Occurrence of erection angles
Angle (°)	Percent of population
0–30	4.9
30–60	29.6
60–85	30.9
85–95	9.9
95–120	19.8
120–180	4.9

== History ==
The condition was first described in 1561 in correspondence between Andreas Vesalius and Gabriele Falloppio and separately by Gabriele Falloppio. The condition is named after François Gigot de la Peyronie, who described it in 1743. Peyronie was the personal physician of King Louis XV and cofounder of the Académie Royale de Chirurgie, which was later included in the French Académie nationale de médecine.

== Research ==
Pentoxifylline is a synthetic methylxanthine derivative that is commonly used for peripheral vascular disease, but has also been researched as a possible treatment for Peyronie's disease. It's proposed to act through multiple mechanisms, including antioxidant, antifibrotic (including reducing TGF-β), and anti-inflammatory pathways, to interfere with the disease's pathogenesis and reduce symptoms such as penile curvature, pain, and plaque volume. While systematic reviews indicate a lack of consistent large-scale evidence for its efficacy, various clinical studies and case reports suggest that pentoxifylline, especially in combination with other therapies, may effectively reduce the progression of Peyronie's disease.

== See also ==
- Body dysmorphic disorder
- Penile dysmorphic disorder
- Dupuytren's contracture
