= Uwe Klima =

Uwe Klima (born 1 July 1964) is UAE based professor of surgery and a faculty member at the Hannover Medical School, Germany. He also is the medical and managing director at German Heart Centre, Dubai.

His area of research includes stem cells and tissue engineering, valve repair, cardio protection, heart failure and valve surgery implantation techniques. Klima has co-authored over 300 articles in peer-reviewed journals and conferences.

== Early life and education ==
Klima was born on July 1, 1964, in Vienna, Austria. He studied medicine (MD) at the University of Vienna, Austria in 1988. He completed a PhD at Hannover Medical School, Germany in 2000. He is a fellow of the Max Kade Foundation at Massachusetts General Hospital and Harvard Medical School, Boston.

Klima worked at the Hannover Medical School, Germany from 2000 to 2010 as Senior Consultant on surgical techniques for treating thoracic and cardiovascular. He was appointed Professor at Hannover Medical School in 2004.

From 2006 to 2009, he was a full-time professor of surgery division of surgery at the National University of Singapore and was also appointed Full Professor at Yong Loo Lin School of Medicine.

In 2009, he moved to Dubai and was appointed Chairman of the department of Cardiothoracic- and Vascular Surgery at the American Hospital Dubai. During his time at the American Hospital, he was also appointed as an advisory board member of the Nanostart Asia-Pacific and director at the Klife-Medical Singapore. In 2014, Klima joined BR Medical Suites and Mediclinic City Hospital as senior consultant, Cardiothoracic- and Vascular Surgery. As of 2017, he is the medical and managing director at the German Heart Centre.

== Memberships and fellowships ==
- 1988, 1989 Ludwig-Boltzmann Institute for Laser Surgery Vienna, Austria
- 1990 Austrian Society of Trauma Surgery
- 1994 Austrian Society of Thoracic and Cardiovascular Surgery
- 1998 Clinical Fellowship, Pediatric Cardiac Surgery Children's Hospital, Boston, MA
- 1998 Clinical Fellowship, Pediatric Cardiac Surgery Columbia University, New York, NY
- 1999 European Association of Cardiothoracic Surgery 2000 German Society, Minimally Invasive Cardiac Surgery
- 2000 German Society, Thoracic and Cardiovascular Surgery

== Major accolades ==
- 1988- Professor Dr. Walter Pilgerstorfer Prize for Best Medical Publication of the Medical Society of Upper Austria
- 2006- Lillehei Investigator Award from European Association Cardiothoracic Surgery Stockholm
- 2008- National Excellent Service Award (EXSA)- GOLD Singapore

== Selected publications ==
- Klima, U. (2004-09-14). "Magnetic Vascular Port in Minimally Invasive Direct Coronary Artery Bypass Grafting". Circulation. 110 (11_suppl_1): II–55–II-60. doi:10.1161/01.CIR.0000138391.77285.d9. ISSN 0009-7322. PMID 15364839.
- Klima, Uwe; Falk, Volkmar; Maringka, Michael; Bargenda, Steffen; Badack, Steven; Moritz, Anton; Mohr, Friedrich; Haverich, Axel; Wimmer-Greinecker, Gerhard (2003-11-01). "Magnetic vascular coupling for distal anastomosis in coronary artery bypass grafting: A multicenter trial". The Journal of Thoracic and Cardiovascular Surgery. 126 (5): 1568–1574. doi:10.1016/S0022-5223(03)01314-X. ISSN 0022-5223. PMID 14666034.
- Klima, Uwe; Solien, Eric E.; Emery, Robert W. (2015). "Clinical evaluation of the eSVS Mesh: First-in-Man trial outcomes". ASAIO Journal. 61 (2): 178–83. doi:10.1097/MAT.0000000000000187. PMID 25493460. S2CID 23333421.
- "One-year patency control and risk analysis of eSVS®-mesh-supported coronary saphenous vein grafts". ResearchGate.
- "Computerized tomographic angiography in patients having eSVS Mesh® supported coronary saphenous vein grafts: Intermediate term results". ResearchGate.
