= Marko Turina =

Croatian cardiac surgeon (1937–2026)

Marko Ivan Turina (23 January 1937 – 7 November 2026) was a Croatian and Swiss cardiac surgeon, a giant of cardiac surgery and a defining figure in the history of EACTS. He was the Director of Klinik für Herzgefasschirurgie, University Hospital of Zurich in Zurich, Switzerland.

Turina was one of the first surgeons to insert an artificial heart outside the chest and among the first to operate on congenital heart defects. His career was marked by outstanding patient outcomes.

== Life and career ==
Marko Ivan Turina was born in Zagreb, Croatia, on 23 January 1937. As a student the Communist Party of Yugoslavia declared him a bourgeois he had no future in SFR Yugoslavia. At first Communists sent him to Banja Luka to serve in the army. His wish to attend Belgrade Academy for Medical Officers was denied. After that he decided to leave Yugoslavia. He was considered as political emigrant by communist regime because of his anti-Communist attitudes. He went to Switzerland where he found a job at the University Hospital of Zürich in 1964 under surgeon Åke Senning. In 1985 he became chief of Center for Heart and Blood Vessels Diseases. He was retired in 2004, despite his ambitions to continue his career. His retirement came shortly after the death of a patient he and his team operated on, the patient was transplanted a heart of non-compatible blood type. Turina continued to practice outside Switzerland. He has been active until his 80s, teaching about cardiac surgery around the world.

He was a co-founder of EACTS Annual Meeting, served as a president of the European Association for Cardio-Thoracic Surgery (EACTS) and Editor-in-Chief of The European Journal of Cardio-Thoracic Surgery, medical Dean at the University of Zürich. He has authored or co-authored more than 600 peer-reviewed scientific publications with h-index of 92. He received the EACTS Lifetime Achievement Award at the 39th EACTS Annual Meeting in October 2025.

Turina died on 7.November 2026, at the age of 89 in Zurich.
