= Keyvan Moghissi =

Cardiothoracic surgeon (1927-2025)

Keyvan Moghissi FRCS FETCS, Mem Acad Chir (Membre étranger)
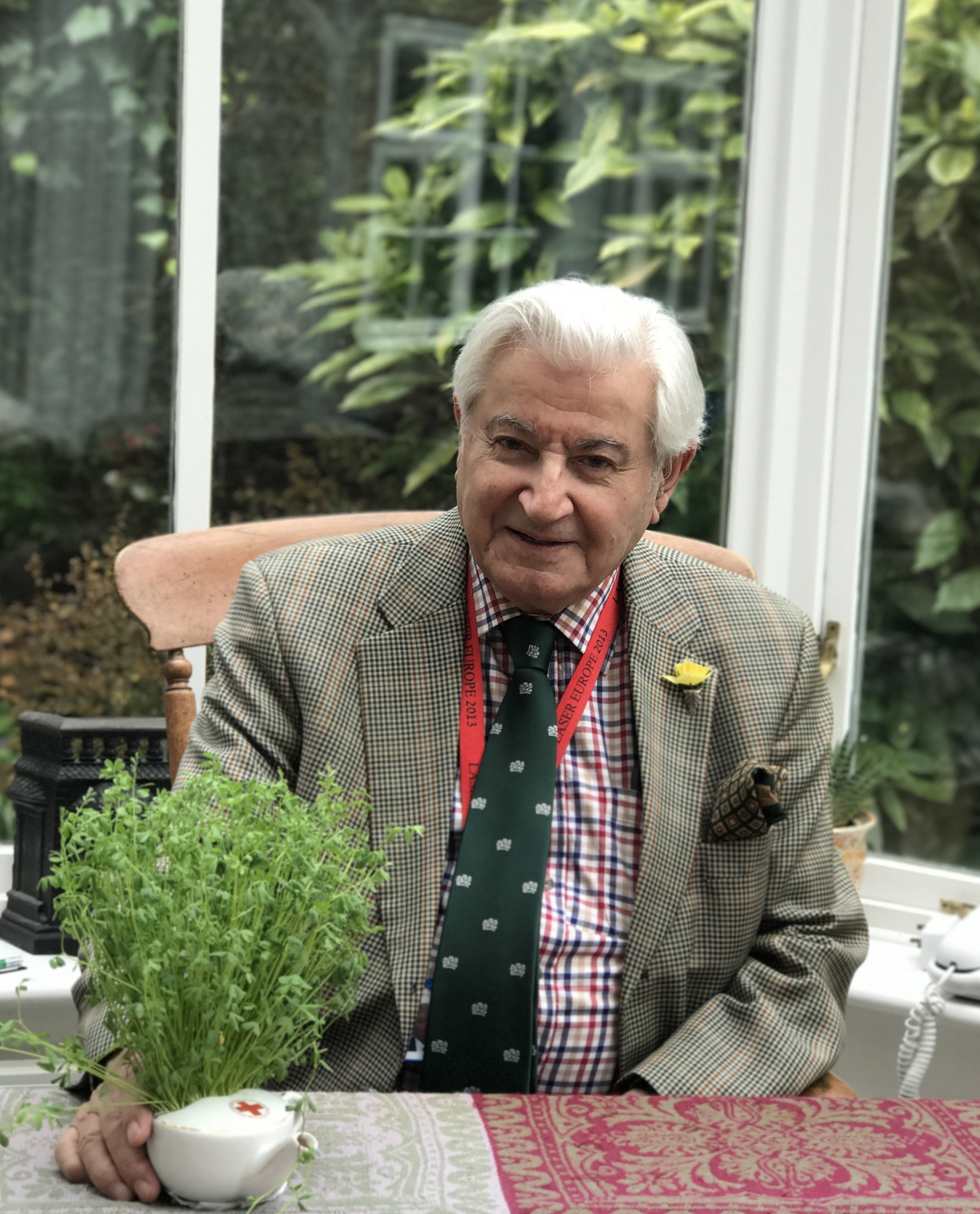
- Keyvan Moghissi in 2017
- Born: 22 June 1927; Tehran, Persia
- Died: 13 November 2025 (aged 98)
- Education: Tehran, University of Geneva
- Occupations: Consultant, professor, surgeon
- Years active: 1954-1997
- Known for: Early use of Nd:YAG laser in thoracic surgery.
- Medical career
- Field: cardiothoracic and laser surgery, photodynamic medicine
- Institutions: Castle Hill Hospital, Hull

Keyvan Moghissi (22 June 1927 – 13 November 2025) was a British cardiothoracic surgeon and professor, who helped to set up two major research centres for cardiac surgery and laser therapeutic pathways, in Hull and Goole respectively.

== Early life ==
Keyvan Moghissi was born in Tehran, then called Persia and now Iran, into a Bahá’í family, the second of six children. His father, Ahmad Moghissi-Chirazi, was a civil servant, and his mother, Monireh Rouhan, was a teacher. He went to a medical school in Tehran, as his elder brother had done previously, before going to the University of Geneva in 1947 to gain his surgical qualifications. Whilst in Switzerland he met a British nurse, Elsie Alexander, who was later to become his wife.

In 1954 Rouhan moved to England where he trained in London before becoming a practitioner, including at Great Ormond Street and Harefield Hospitals, as well as several other hospitals outside of London.

== Career in Hull and Goole ==
In 1970 Moghissi was appointed consultant cardiothoracic surgeon at Castle Hill Hospital, Hull. Under his stewardship this became an important centre for heart surgery and an analytical research hub. In 1979 he was one of the organisers of the European Thoracic Surgery Club, which from 1986 became the European Association for Cardio-Thoracic Surgery (EACTS). He was one of EACTS' eleven founders, wrote EACTS' constitution and become the second president of EACTS in 1987 - 1988. He was one of the founders of the Societas Europeana Pneumologica (European Society of Pneumology) (SEP) in 1981, which is now part of European Respiratory Society.

He was particularly noted as a cardiothoracic surgeon, including the use of heart bypass grafting. At the time he was described as one of the two best known thoracic surgeons in Europe, the other being Ingolf Vogt-Moykop. He co-wrote one of the leading medical textbooks for cardiothoracic surgery.

Later he developed an interest in the early use of lasers, including photodynamic therapy (PDT). He set up a charity in 1985, initially called the Laser Trust Fund (Moghissi), which then became Moghissi Laser Trust, with a view to expanding access to laser treatment to patients, improving training, research and development of clinical use of lasers. In 1997 this set up the Yorkshire Laser Centre, in the grounds of Goole and District Hospital. He was the first surgeon in the UK to use Nd:YAG laser in thoracic surgery, which is now a mainstream procedure, and he and his team contributed to the European Union's licensing of PDT for clinical use with the Photofrin photosensitiser.

Between 1989 and 1997 he held the position of Honorary Professor in Laser / Engineering at the University of Hull.

== Recognition ==
In 1982 was recognised with the award of Membre (étranger) of the Académie nationale de chirurgie in Paris, and the previous year he became a fellow of the Royal College of Surgeons in London. In 1993 he became a fellow of the European Association for Cardio-Thoracic Surgery.

== Personal life and death ==
He wrote three memoirs of his life as a surgeon. His wife predeceased him in 2021, Moghissi died in 2025 at the age of 98 years. He had one son, Alexander. He enjoyed classical music, particularly Johann Sebastian Bach and in his native Tehran he had studied the violin under Abolhasan Saba.
