= Penile ultrasonography =

Medical imaging of the penis

Penile ultrasonography is medical ultrasonography of the penis. Ultrasound is an excellent method for the study of the penis, such as indicated in trauma, priapism, erectile dysfunction or suspected Peyronie's disease.

Ultrasound is an imaging modality that, in addition to being well tolerated and widely available, is considered an excellent method for the evaluation of many penile diseases. Penile trauma, priapism, Peyronie's disease, and erectile dysfunction are some of the conditions in which penile ultrasound finds significant applicability.

Currently, linear transducers have a maximum frequency of 12-15 MHz, which increases the definition on ultrasound images. Although penile evaluation is usually performed when the penis is flaccid, in some situations, such as in cases of erectile dysfunction, the examination should be performed during erection, by injection of vasoactive drugs into the corpora cavernosa. The penis should be positioned in the anatomical position (over the abdomen) and evaluated in the transverse and longitudinal directions, from the glans toward the base of the penis. In specific situations, such as in the evaluation of Peyronie's disease, the penis should also be positioned on a towel/sheet or on the testicular sac, with a lateral approach.

== Anatomy and physiology ==
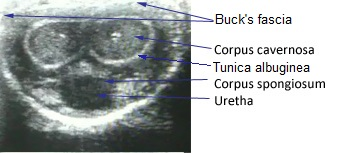
Figure 1: Normal penile anatomy, dorsal and cross-sectional view showing two hypoechoic images corresponding to the corpora cavernosa, with an echoic line that surrounds them and corresponds to the tunica albuginea.

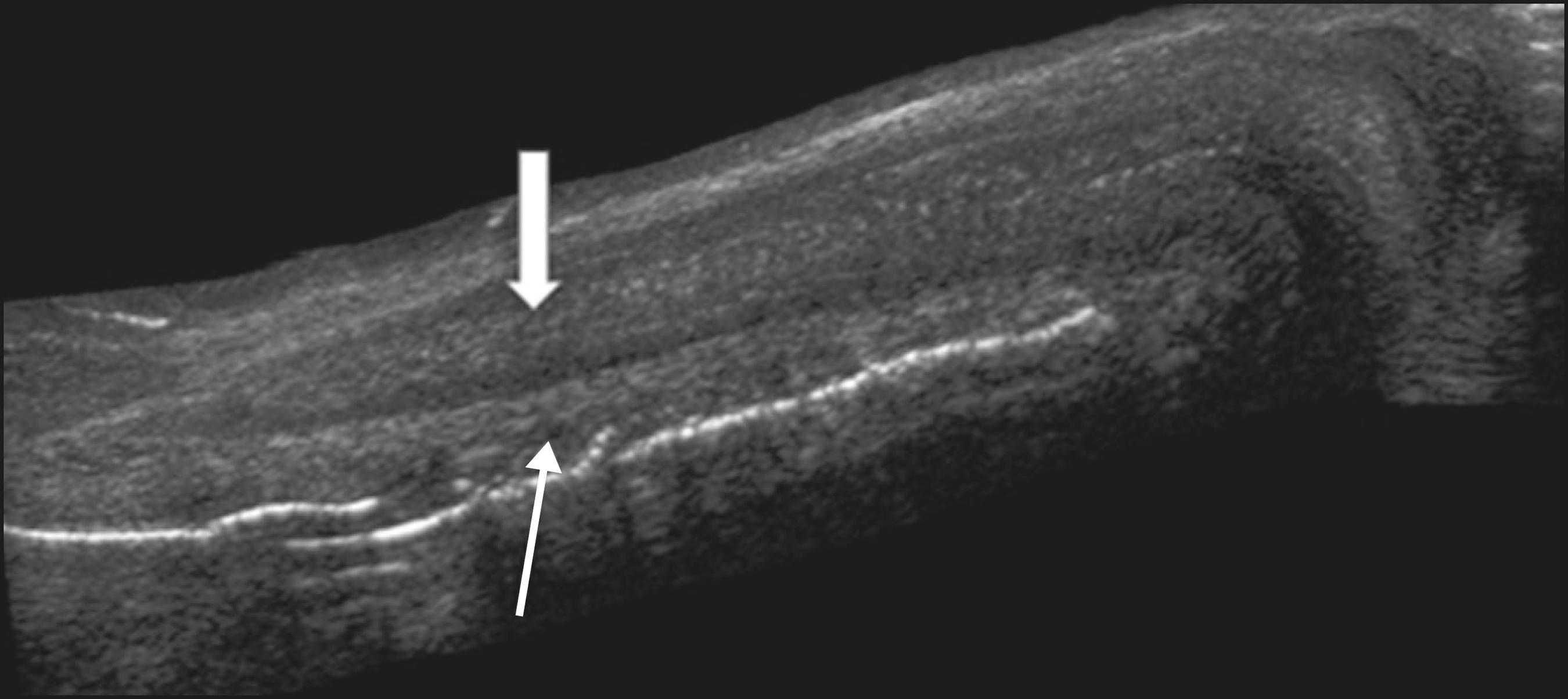
Figure 2: Longitudinal section of the penis under right lateral access. Note the cylindrical structure, corresponding to the corpus cavernosum (thick arrow), in the superior portion and the corpus spongiosum (thin arrow), adjacent to the corpus cavernosum, in the inferior portion.

The corpora cavernosa are homogeneous and relatively hypoechoic cylindrical structures lined with tunica albuginea, a thin membrane that has a thickness of approximately 2 mm when the penis is flaccid and 0.25 mm when it is erect. The corpus spongiosum, a ventral, medial body that is more echoic than the corpora cavernosa, is also covered by the tunica albuginea and contains the urethra. As can be seen in Figures 1 and 2, it is more dilated and prominent in its proximal segment, known as the bulb, and in its distal segment, constituting the glans. Buck's fascia is superficial to the tunica albuginea and covers all of the structures described.

Venous drainage is performed by the deep and superficial dorsal veins of the penis. The dorsal arteries of the penis are located adjacent to the deep dorsal vein and a cavernous artery is located in the center of each corpus cavernosum. On color Doppler, the cavernous arteries present single phase flow. In the flaccid penis (Figure 3), the normal cavernous arteries show a systolic peak between 11 and 20 cm/s. At the beginning of erection, the systolic and diastolic flows undergo progressive increases. When vein occlusion begins, the diastolic flow decreases progressively, and once stiffness is established, it becomes negative.

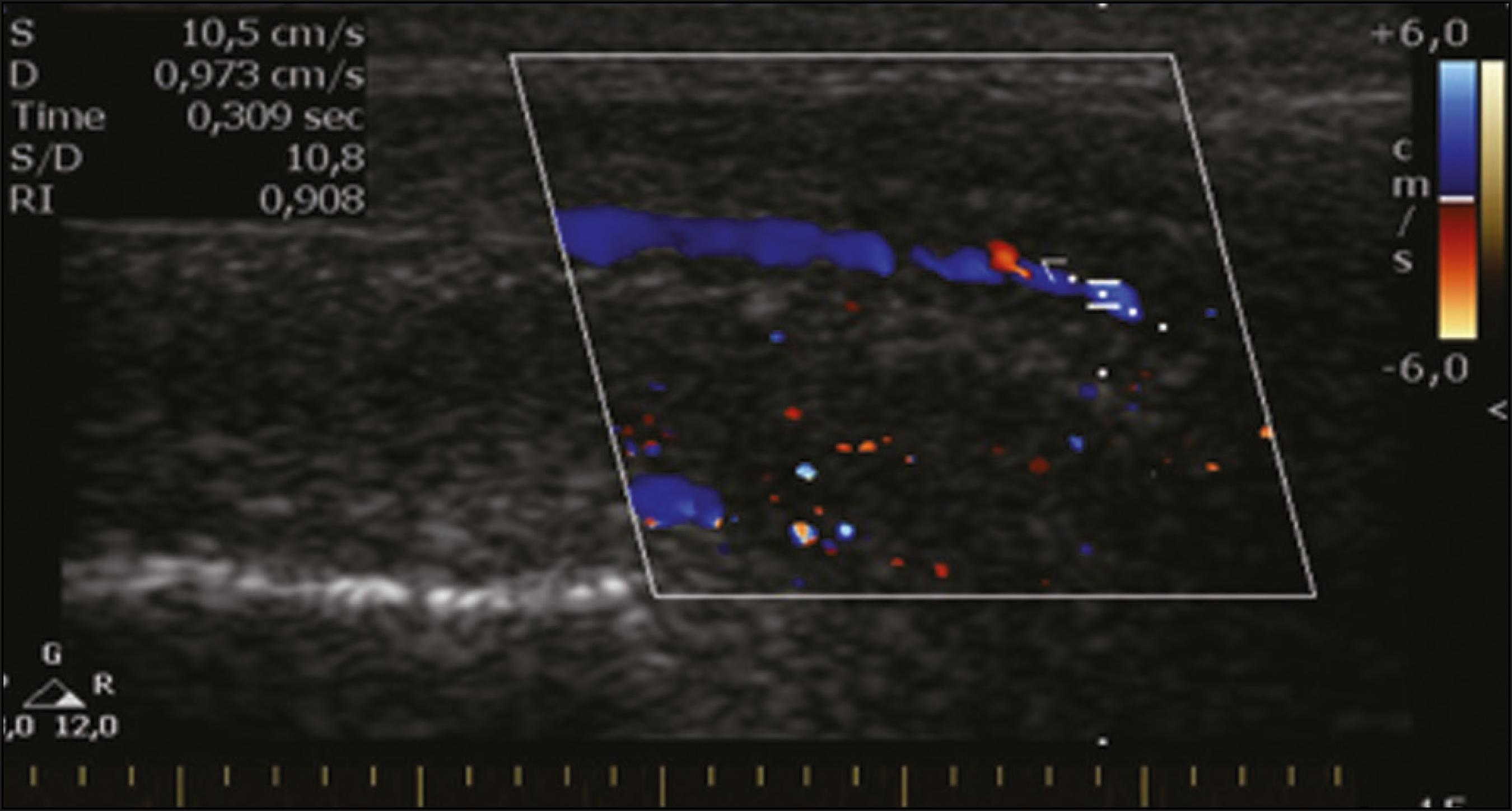
Figure 3: Longitudinal, ventral ultrasound of the penis, with pulsed mode and color Doppler. Normal flow pattern of the cavernous artery in a flaccid penis.

== Penile trauma ==
Penile trauma can result from a blunt or penetrating injury, the latter being rarely investigated by imaging methods, almost always requiring immediate surgical exploration. In the erect penis, trauma results from stretching and narrowing of the tunica albuginea, which can undergo segmental rupture of one or both of the corpora cavernosa, constituting a penile fracture.

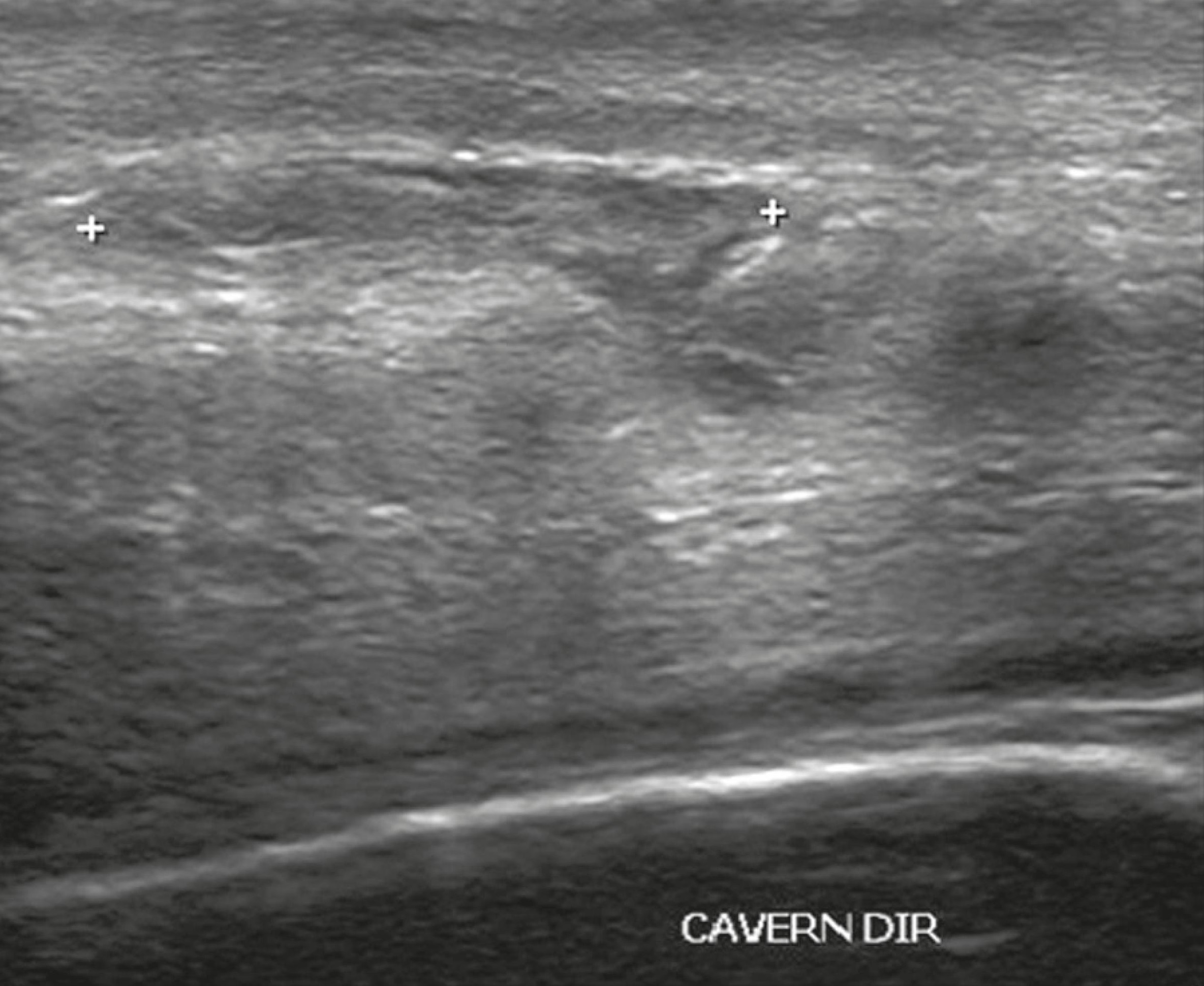
Figure 4 A: Ultrasound of the penis, right lateral view. Longitudinal section showing rupture of the tunica albuginea with an adjacent 1.92 cm hematoma (between calipers), due to trauma.

== Priapism ==
Priapism is defined as a painful and prolonged penile erection, with or without sexual stimulation. Color Doppler ultrasound is the imaging method of choice for the investigation of priapism, because it is noninvasive, widely available, and highly sensitive. By means of this method, it is possible to diagnose priapism and differentiate between its low- and high-flow forms.

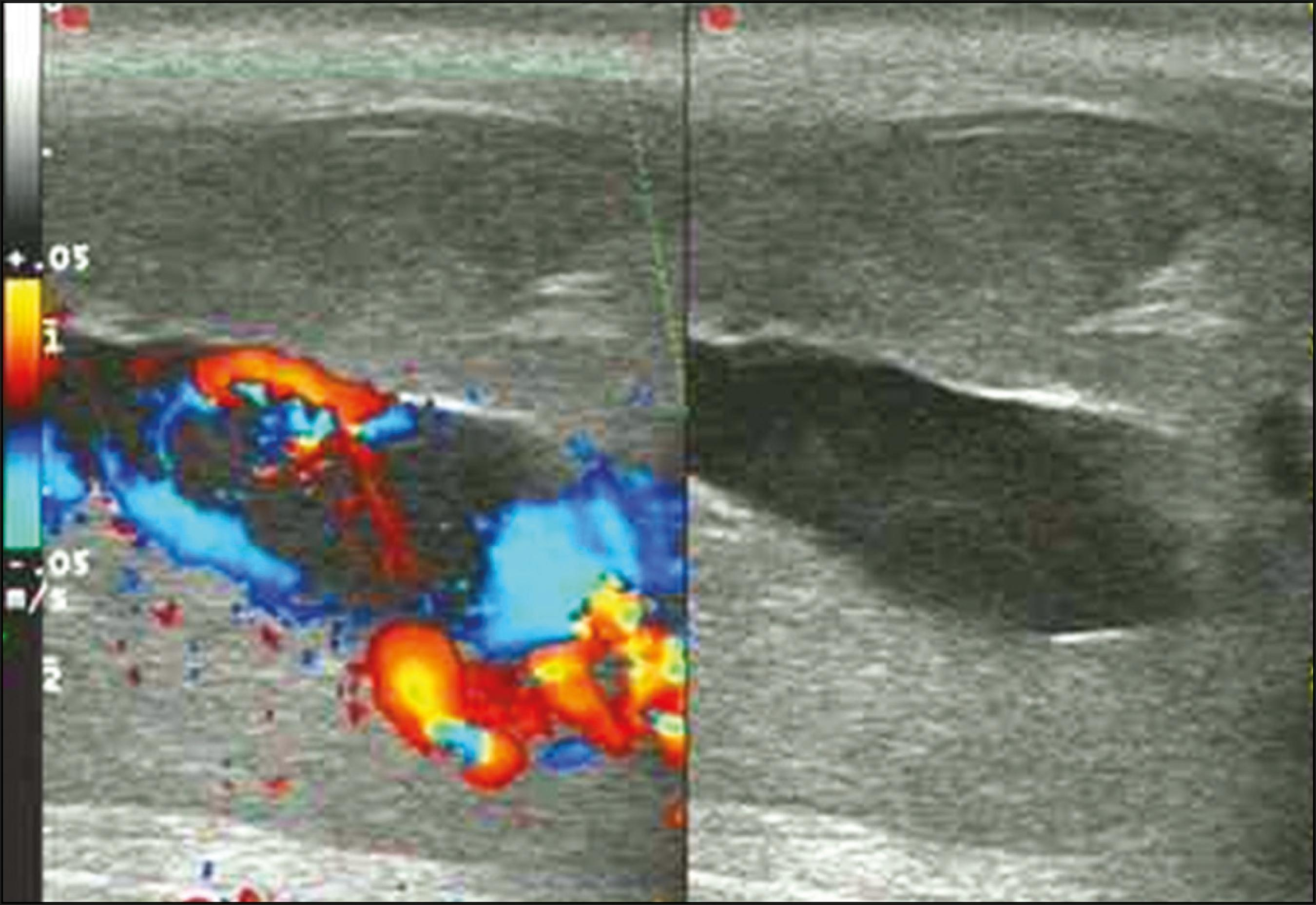
Figure 5: Color Doppler ultrasound demonstrating a hypoechoic collection that corresponds to hematoma with arteriovenous fistula secondary to traumatic injury of the penis due to impact with bicycle handlebars, resulting in high-flow priapism.

== Peyronie's disease ==
Peyronie's disease is characterized by fibrotic thickening of the tunica albuginea, which can lead to curvature of the penis and difficulty in achieving an erection. Penile fibromatosis (Peyronie's disease) is marked by the formation of fibrous plaques identified as areas where the tunica albuginea is thickened. Although plaques are more common on the dorsum of the penis, they can also be seen on the ventral face, lateral face, or septum.

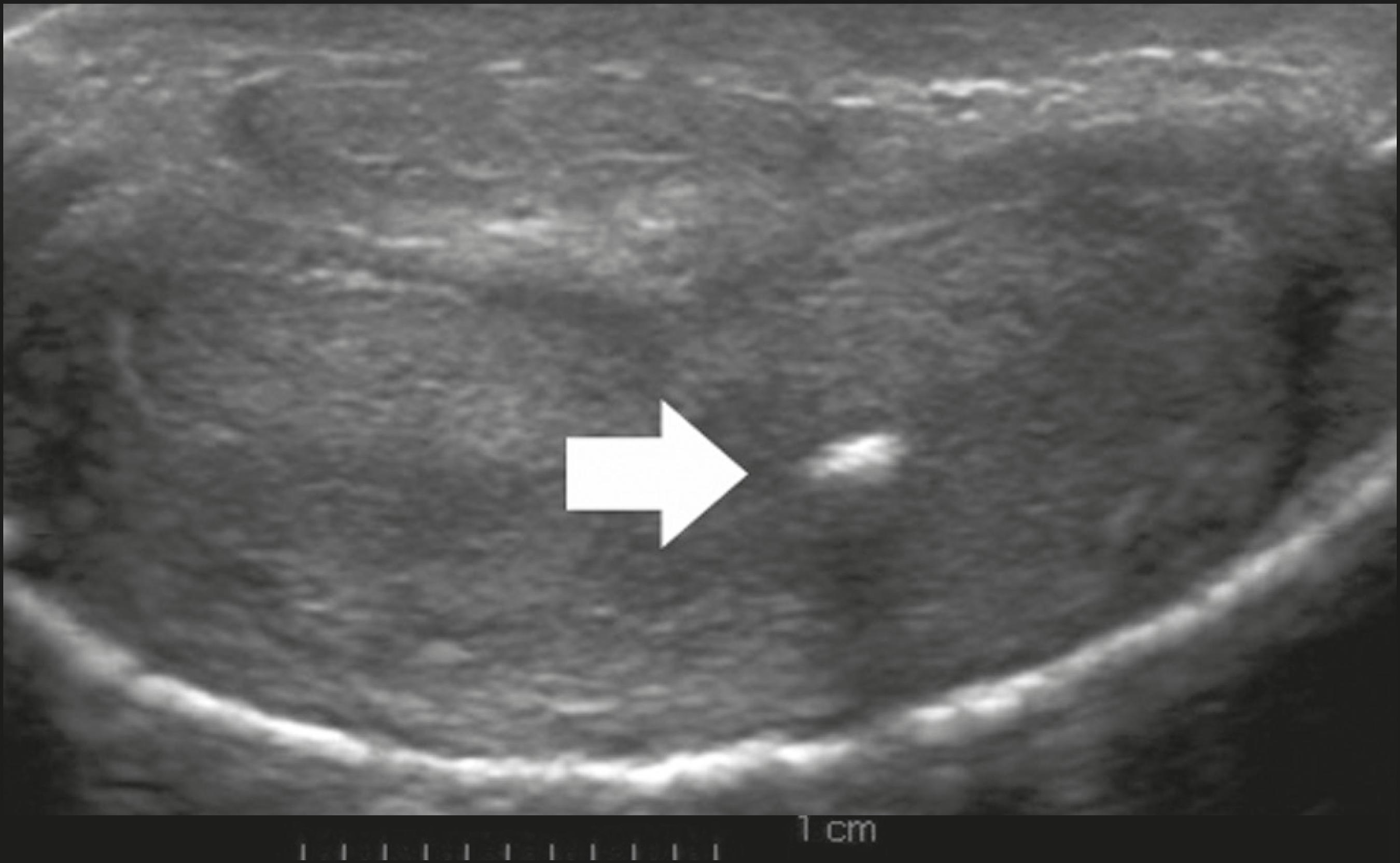
Figure 6: Transverse ultrasound of the penis, in a ventral view, in the middle portion of the penis. Note the echoic image with posterior acoustic shadowing, corresponding to calcification (arrow), in the left corpus cavernosum.

== Erectile dysfunction ==
Most cases of erectile dysfunction of organic causes are related to changes in blood flow in the corpora cavernosa, represented by occlusive artery disease, most often of atherosclerotic origin, or due to failure of the veno-occlusive mechanism. Preceding the ultrasound examination with Doppler, the penis must be examined in B mode, in order to identify possible tumors, fibrotic plaques, calcifications, or hematomas, as well as to evaluate the appearance of the cavernous arteries, which can be tortuous or atheromatous.

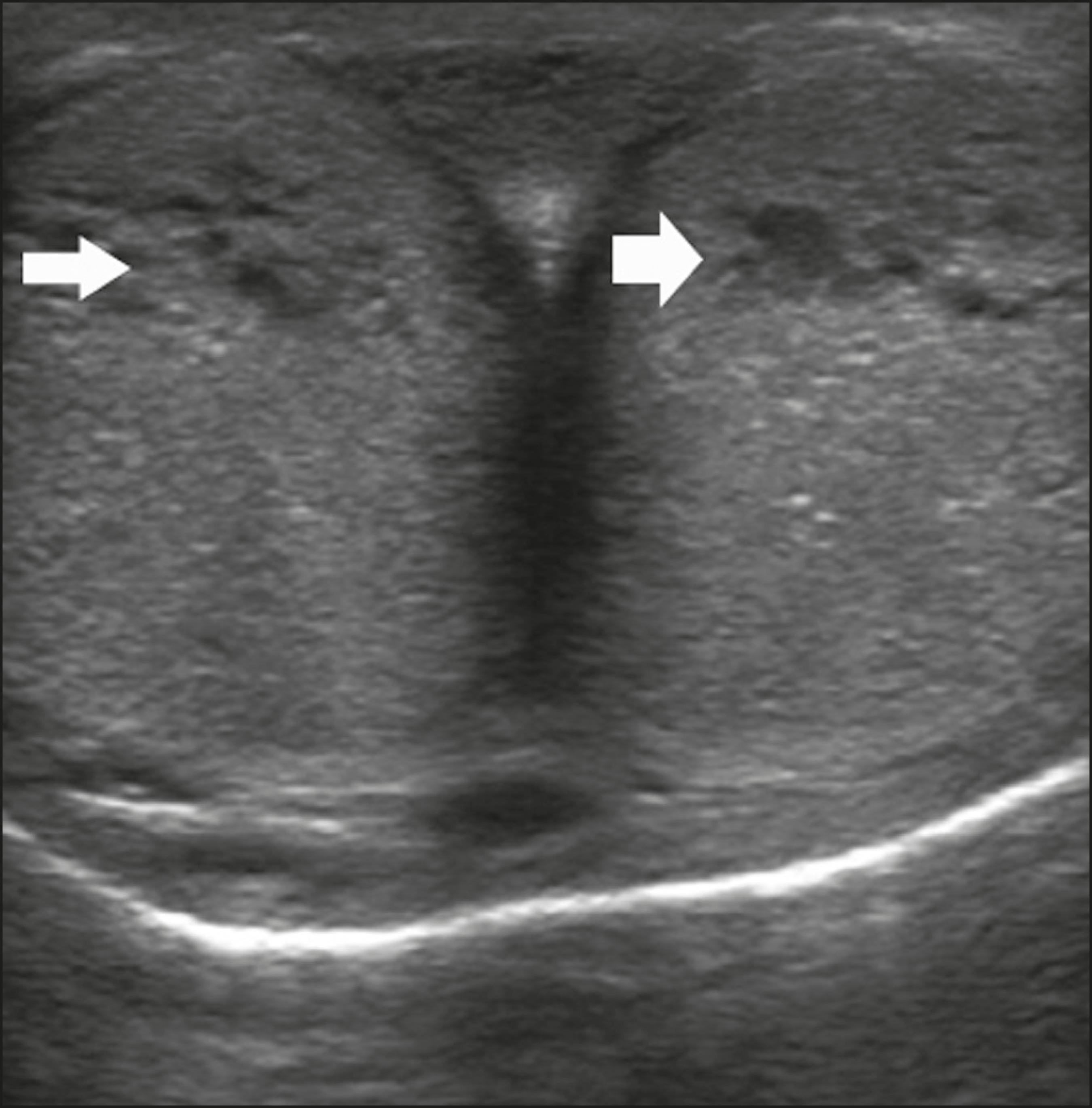
Figure 8 Transverse ultrasound image, ventral view of the penis. Image obtained after induction of an erection, 15 min after injection of prostaglandin E1, showing dilated sinusoids (arrows).
