= European Journal of Cardio-Thoracic Surgery =

- Discipline: Medical journal
- Language: English
- Edited by: Mario Gaudino

Publication details
- History: 1987
- Publisher: Oxford University Press for the European Association for Cardio-Thoracic Surgery and the European Society of Thoracic Surgeons (Germany)
- Frequency: monthly
- Open access: older than 1 year
- Impact factor: 4.191 (2020)

Standard abbreviations
- ISO 4: Eur. J. Cardio-Thorac. Surg.
- NLM: Eur J Cardiothorac Surg

Indexing
- ISSN: 1010-7940 (print); 1873-734X (web)

Links
- Journal homepage

The European Journal of Cardio-Thoracic Surgery, abbreviated Eur J Cardiothorac Surg, is an academic journal, principally covering topics pertaining to cardiac surgery and thoracic surgery. The current Editor-in-Chief is Mario Gaudino, the Stephen and Suzanne Weiss Professor in Cardiothoracic Surgery (II) at Weill Cornell Medical College.

== Editorial board ==
The journal has an editorial board of 28, with 13 associate editors, 8 assistant editors, a managing editor, an editorial manager, and an editor-in-chief.

== Access ==
Articles in the journal become open access one year after publication. The journal is abstracted and indexed by:

- Current Contents (Clinical Medicine)
- EMBASE
- Medline
- Scopus
- Iberoamericana de Información Científica] (SIIC) Data Bases (in Spanish and Portuguese)
