= Critical Care Clinics =

Quarterly peer-reviewed medical journal

- Discipline: Intensive care
- Language: English
- Edited by: John A. Kellum, Jr

Publication details
- History: 1985-present
- Publisher: Elsevier
- Frequency: Quarterly
- Impact factor: 1.927 (2016)

Standard abbreviations
- ISO 4: Crit. Care Clin.

Indexing
- CODEN: CCCLEH
- ISSN: 0749-0704 (print); 1557-8232 (web)
- LCCN: 85643425
- OCLC no.: 11078407

Links
- Journal homepage; Online access; Online archive; Journal page on publisher's website

Critical Care Clinics is a quarterly peer-reviewed medical journal covering intensive care medicine. The editor-in-chief is John A. Kellum Jr. (University of Pittsburgh). It was established in 1985 and is published by Elsevier.

== Abstracting and indexing ==
The journal is abstracted and indexed in:

- BIOSIS Previews
- Chemical Abstracts
- CINAHL
- Current Contents/Clinical Medicine
- Embase
- Index Medicus/MEDLINE/PubMed
- Science Citation Index Expanded
- Scopus

According to the Journal Citation Reports, the journal has a 2016 impact factor of 1.927, ranking it 23rd out of 33 journals in the category "Critical Care Medicine".
