= Journal of Cardiothoracic Surgery =

- Discipline: Surgery
- Language: English
- Edited by: Editor-in-Chief: Dr Vipin Zamvar; Deputy Editors: Dr Marko Turina, and Dr Teresa Kieser.

Publication details
- History: 2006–present
- Publisher: BioMed Central
- Impact factor: 1.47 (2019)

Standard abbreviations
- ISO 4: J. Cardiothorac. Surg.

Indexing
- ISSN: 1749-8090

Links
- Journal homepage

The Journal of Cardiothoracic Surgery is an open access, peer-reviewed online journal that encompasses all aspects of research in cardiothoracic surgery.The Journal publishes original scientific research related to all domains of cardiac, vascular and thoracic surgery.
