= François Gigot de la Peyronie =

French surgeon (1678–1747)

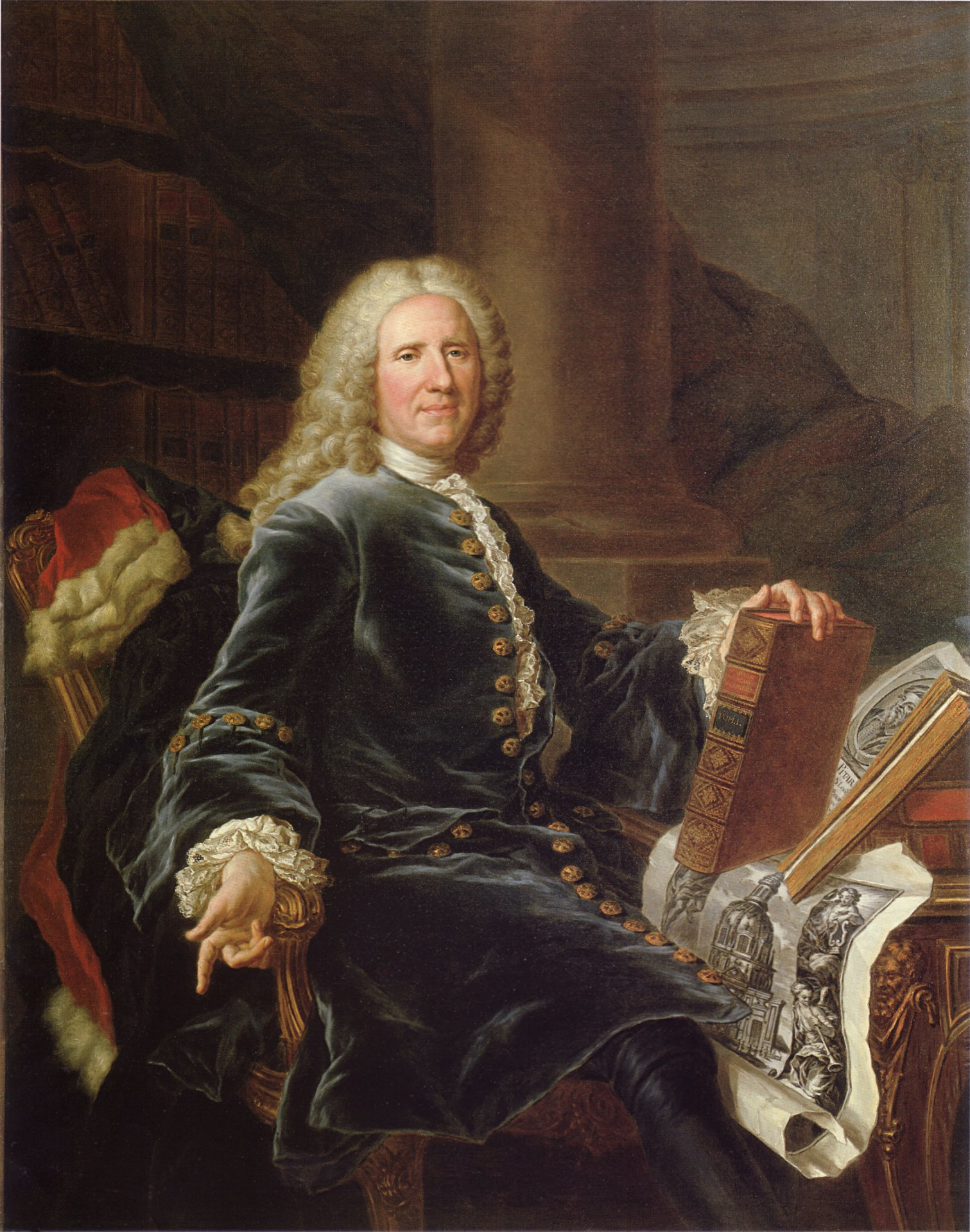
- Born: 15 January 1678; Montpellier, France
- Died: 25 April 1747 (aged 69)
- Occupation: Surgeon
- Known for: Peyronie's disease

François Gigot de la Peyronie (pronounced [fʁɑ̃swa ʒiɡo də la pɛʁɔni]; 15 January 1678 – 25 April 1747) was a French surgeon who was born in Montpellier, Languedoc, France. His name is associated with a condition known as Peyronie's disease.

As a teenager, he studied philosophy and surgery in Montpellier, where in 1695 he received his diploma as a barber-surgeon. He continued his education in Paris as a student of Georges Mareschal (1658–1736), who was chief-surgeon at the Hôpital de la Charité. Afterwards he returned to Montpellier as lecturer on anatomy and surgery, and was surgeon-major at the Hôtel-Dieu de Montpellier. In 1714 Peyronie returned to Paris, where he was appointed surgeon-major at the Hôpital de la Charité. In Paris he also taught anatomy at the Jardin du Roi and at the amphitheatre of Saint-Côme.

In 1736, after the death of Mareschal, he became first-surgeon to King Louis XV. He took interest in the medical educational system, and was instrumental in the reorganization of surgical schools. He was a major factor regarding the creation of a 1743 law that banned barbers from practicing surgery. With Georges Mareschal, he founded the Académie Royale de Chirurgie (1731), and was its chairman from 1736 to 1747. At Montpellier, Peyronie donated the money for the construction of an amphitheatre based on the Collège Saint-Côme de Paris. In 1752 the construction began, and in 1757 the grand opening of the Hotel Saint-Côme de Montpellier took place.

In 1743 Peyronie described a disorder characterized by induration of the corpora cavernosa of the penis. This condition is now referred to as Peyronie's disease.
