= Georges Mareschal =

French surgeon (1658–1736)

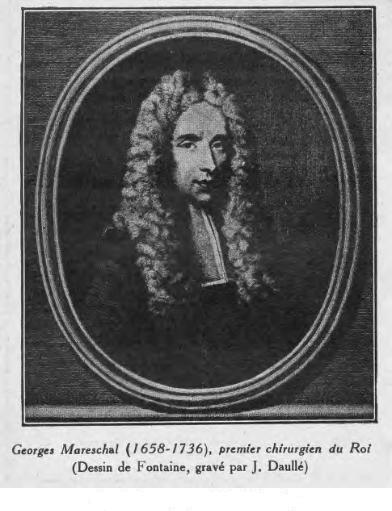
Georges Mareschal (1658-1736)

Georges Mareschal (8 April 1658, Calais, Province of Picardy – 13 December 1736, Château de Bièvres) was a French surgeon. In 1707 he was ennobled, and was known as Georges Mareschal, seigneur de Bièvre.

He was the son of John Marshall, an Irish gentleman who was knighted in 1643 for his service during the Battle of Rocroi. In 1677, Mareschal moved to Paris, where he worked as a surgical assistant. From 1684 onward, he worked at the Hôpital de la Charité, where in 1688, he became master surgeon, later earning the title of chief surgeon (1692).

He was first surgeon to Louis XIV, even caring for him on his deathbed, and then to Louis XV. In 1723 he was awarded the Ordre de Saint-Michel for successfully treating the Infanta of Spain. In 1731, with François Gigot de la Peyronie (1678–1747), he founded the Académie Royale de Chirurgie. He is credited with making improvements in lithotomical surgery.
