= Family aggregation =

Clustering of traits within a family

Family aggregation, also known as familial aggregation, is the clustering of certain traits, behaviours, or disorders within a given family. Family aggregation may arise because of genetic or environmental similarities.

== Schizophrenia ==
The data from the family aggregation studies have been extensively studied to determine the mode of inheritance of schizophrenia. Studies to date have shown that when numerous families are studied, simple modes of inheritance are not statistically supported. The majority of studies analyzing for the mode of inheritance have concluded that a multifactorial threshold mode is most likely.

== Cardiovascular problems ==
The most consistent and dramatic evidence of family influences on cardiovascular disease (CVD) is family aggregation of physiological factors. In several studies, the parent-child and sibling-sibling correlations of blood pressure are approximately .24. Genetic determination of blood pressure is strong, but does not explain all of the variance.

== Parkinson's disease ==
Familial Parkinson's disease (PD) exists but is infrequent. Early investigations failed to show substantial family aggregation for PD.
