= Journal of Cardiac Surgery =

- Discipline: Cardiology, surgery
- Language: English
- Edited by: Tomas Salerno

Publication details
- History: 1986-present
- Publisher: John Wiley & Sons
- Frequency: Bimonthly
- Impact factor: 1.6 (2022)

Standard abbreviations
- ISO 4: J. Card. Surg.

Indexing
- ISSN: 0886-0440 (print); 1540-8191 (web)

Links
- Journal homepage; Online access; Online archive

The Journal of Cardiac Surgery is a peer-reviewed medical journal about cardiology and surgery that was established in March 1986.

The current editor in chief of the journal is Tomas Salerno of the University of Miami.
