= The Journal of Thoracic and Cardiovascular Surgery =

Peer-reviewed scientific journal

- Discipline: cardiothoracic surgery, cardiology, pulmonary disease
- Language: English
- Edited by: G. Alexander Patterson

Publication details
- Former name: Journal of Thoracic Surgery
- History: 1931–present
- Publisher: Elsevier (United States and Canada)
- Frequency: Monthly
- Impact factor: 5.209 (2020)

Standard abbreviations
- ISO 4: J. Thorac. Cardiovasc. Surg.

Indexing
- ISSN: 0022-5223 (print); 1097-685X (web)

Links
- Journal homepage

The Journal of Thoracic and Cardiovascular Surgery is a monthly peer-reviewed medical journal covering cardiothoracic surgery, cardiology, pulmonary medicine, and vascular disease published by Elsevier. It is the official journal of the American Association for Thoracic Surgery and the Western Thoracic Surgical Association.

== History and Impact ==
The journal was established in 1931 as the Journal of Thoracic Surgery. The journal has the second highest impact factor of all cardiothoracic surgery journals. According to the Journal Citation Reports, its 2020 impact factor is 5.209, ranking it 21st out of 212 journals in the category "Surgery".
