= European Association for Cardio-Thoracic Surgery =

European Association for Cardio-Thoracic Surgery (EACTS)
- Type: Professional association
- Headquarters: Windsor, Berkshire
- Location: United Kingdom
- Official language: English
- Website: www.eacts.org

The European Association for Cardio-Thoracic Surgery (EACTS) is a membership organisation devoted to the practice of cardiothoracic surgery. The mission statement of the association is to advance education in the field of cardiac, thoracic and vascular interventions; and promote research into cardiovascular and thoracic physiology, pathology and therapy, with the aim to correlate and disseminate the results for the public benefit. Within the EACTS there is a large number of committees working on various issues in order to improve cardio-thoracic surgery.

== Organizational history ==
EACTS was founded as a European organisation. However, its membership is now spread all over the world in all continents representing some 70 countries. Since its foundation in 1986 more than 3500 members have been admitted, and the interest in applying for membership has grown considerably during the last few years.

=== Annual meeting ===
The EACTS Annual Meeting is the largest cardio-thoracic meeting in the world focusing on scientific developments and research in the following specialities: Acquired Cardiac Disease, Congenital Heart Disease, Vascular Disease and Thoracic Disease.

=== Journals ===
The EACTS publishes two journals focused on high-quality research and cardio thoracic surgery education and one website featuring video based cardio-thoracic tutorials these are: European Journal of Cardio-Thoracic Surgery (EJCTS), Interactive Cardiovascular and Thoracic Surgery (ICVTS), and Multimedia Manual of Cardio-Thoracic Surgery (MMCTS)

=== Quality Improvement Programme ===
The Quality Improvement Programme was launched in 2012 to facilitate continuing improvement of clinical outcomes in adult cardiac surgery through improving education, and various research initiatives.

The organisation has collaborated with the European Society of Cardiology, the American Heart Association, Oxford University, and other organizations to produce clinical practice guidelines and consensus statements related to the treatment of cardiovascular disease.

== Secretaries General ==
| Secretary General | Tenure |
|---|---|
| Marko Turina | 1986 - 1993 |
| Torkel Aberg | 1994 - 2002 |
| Bruce Keogh | 2003 - 2008 |
| Pieter Kappetein | 2009 - 2017 |
| Domenico Pagano | 2017 – 2021 |
| Rafael Sádaba | 2021 - present |

== Presidents ==
| President | Year |
|---|---|
| Francis Fontan | 1986 - 1987 |
| Keyvan Moghissi | 1987 - 1988 |
| Fritz Sebening | 1988 - 1989 |
| Hans Huysmans | 1989 - 1990 |
| Maurizio Cotrufo | 1990 - 1991 |
| Ramiro Rivera | 1991 - 1992 |
| Jaroslav Stark | 1992 - 1993 |
| Armand Piwnica | 1993 - 1994 |
| Hans Borst | 1994 - 1995 |
| Toni Lerut | 1995 - 1996 |
| Ernst Wolner | 1996 - 1997 |
| Eugene Baudet | 1997 - 1998 |
| David Wheatley | 1998 - 1999 |
| Joachim Hasse | 1999 - 2000 |
| Marcos Murtra | 2000 - 2001 |
| Marko Turina | 2001 - 2002 |
| Walter Klepetko | 2002 - 2003 |
| James Monro | 2003 - 2004 |
| Torkel Aberg | 2004 - 2005 |
| Tom Treasure | 2005 - 2006 |
| Siegfried Hagl | 2006 - 2007 |
| Paul Sergeant | 2007 - 2008 |
| Erino A. Rendina | 2008 - 2009 |
| Pascal Vouhe | 2009 - 2010 |
| Ottavio Alfieri | 2010 - 2011 |
| Ludwig K. von Segesser | 2011 - 2012 |
| Jose Luis Pomar | 2012 - 2013 |
| Paul Van Schil | 2013 - 2014 |
| Martin Grabenwöger | 2014 - 2015 |
| Friedrich-Wilhelm Mohr | 2015 - 2016 |
| Miguel Sousa Uva | 2016 - 2017 |
| Marian Zembala | 2017 - 2018 |
| Ruggero De Paulis | 2018 - 2019 |
| Peter Licht | 2019 - 2020 |
| Mark Hazekamp | 2020 - 2021 |
