= The 'Finger-Assisted' Nephrectomy of Professor Nadey Hakim =

Painting by Henry Ward

The 'Finger-Assisted' Nephrectomy of Professor Nadey Hakim and the World Presidents of the International College of Surgeons in Chicago, or, The Wise in Examination of the Torn Contemporary State
- Artist: Henry Ward
- Year: 2010
- Medium: Oil on canvas
- Dimensions: 167.6 cm × 304.8 cm (66.0 in × 120.0 in)
- Location: Başkent University, Ankara, Turkey

The 'Finger-Assisted' Nephrectomy of Professor Nadey Hakim and the World Presidents of the International College of Surgeons in Chicago, or, The Wise in Examination of the Torn Contemporary State is a painting by British artist Henry Ward depicting transplant surgeon Nadey Hakim demonstrating the removal of a living donor kidney. It is on display at Başkent University, Ankara, Turkey.

The painting uses Rembrandt's The Anatomy Lesson of Dr. Nicolaes Tulp (1632) as a reference, showing Hakim surrounded by the modern presidents and members of the International College of Surgeons in Chicago. It took one year to complete and was unveiled in 2010.

It was chosen to be included in the exhibition for the 2010 BP Portrait Awards and in Sandy Nairne's book 500 Portraits: 25 Years of The BP Portrait Award (2012).

== Background ==
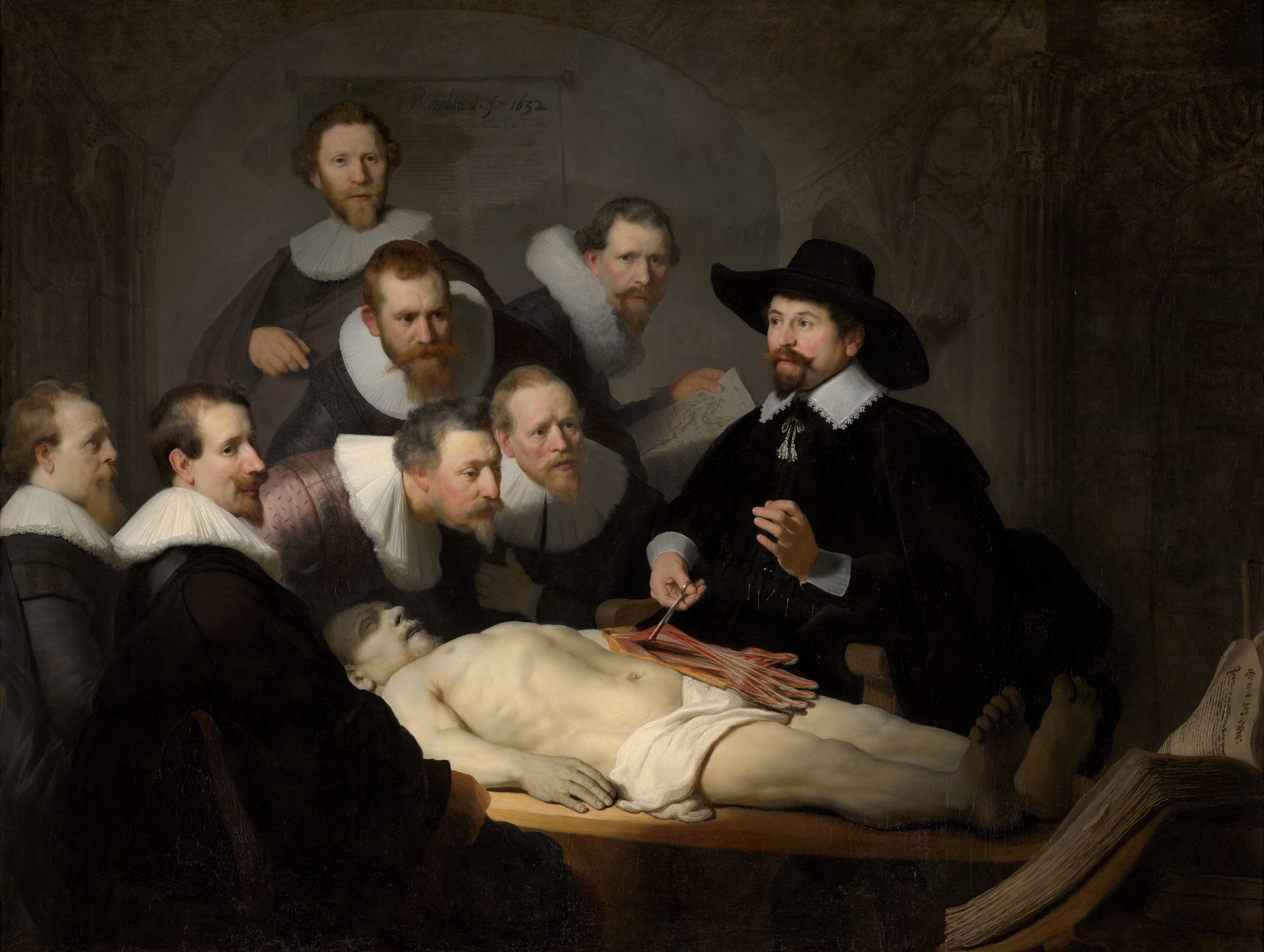
The Anatomy Lesson of Dr. Nicolaes Tulp. Rembrandt, oil on canvas, 1632.

Henry Ward had always wanted to recreate Rembrandt's The Anatomy Lesson of Dr. Nicolaes Tulp. With the co-operation of Nadey Hakim, he planned to recreate the painting using the modern presidents and key members of the International College of Surgeons in order to highlight the global requirement for live, legal, organ donors. Hakim, who Ward had met when they were both members of the British Red Cross's International Fundraising Committee in 2004, already knew of the painting and had used it on the cover of one of his medical papers.

== Composition ==
With the help of Hakim, Ward was able to take photographs and make preliminary drawings of the surgeons prior to beginning to create the painting in oil over the course of one year. As part of his research, in 2009 he attended the removal of a kidney using the finger-assisted method at the Hammersmith Hospital, and being seated next to the patient was able to sketch the procedure.

The painting shows Nadey Hakim demonstrating his procedure for kidney removal from a donor, an operation that involves a small incision between the tenth and eleventh ribs and results in improved operative safety over other methods of removal. The surgeons shown are, from left to right, Said Dee, Arno Roscher, Earl Owen, Rocco Maruotti, Christopher Chen, Nadey Hakim, John Fournier, George Fayad, Adel Ramzy, Biagio Ravo and Refaat Kamel.

Ward decided to paint the surgeons in business suits to follow the example of Rembrandt whose subjects are in contemporary dress, and because if he had used surgical scrubs there would have been little to distinguish them. Formal wear also allowed him to depict their ties, so adding some additional colour and design to the work. His aim was to give each surgeon equal prominence which he achieved through the creation of three tiers of figures along a horizontal plane and the careful manipulation of light. The pyramidal structure of the figures is as used by the old masters.

== Unveiling and reception ==
The painting was unveiled in the Lord Speaker's private chamber of the House of Lords, by Baroness Finlay of Llandaff in 2010. Frank Delmonico, president-elect of The Transplantation Society, spoke on human organ transplantation and organ donation.

The painting was subsequently chosen to be included in the display of the BP Portrait Award 2010 at the National Portrait Gallery, the largest work ever to be included, following which it toured with the intention of ultimately being placed on display at the International Museum of Surgical Science in Chicago. Sandy Nairne, director of the National Portrait Gallery, included the painting in his book 500 Portraits: 25 Years of The BP Portrait Award in 2012.

Hakim later offered the painting to Mehmet Haberal at Başkent University, Ankara, Turkey, where it is on display.

== See also ==
- The Anatomy Lesson of Dr. Deijman
