= Ekpenyong =

- Gender: Masculine

Origin
- Language: Ibibio
- Origin: Nigeria
- Meaning: Lion from the river or sea/ Lion from above
- Region of origin: South-south Nigeria

Other names
- Derivative: Ekpe

Ekpenyong // is a Nigerian surname of Ibibio and Efik origin which means "Lion of the river or sea". It could also mean "Lion from above"

== Notable people with the surname ==
- Ita Ekpeyong (fl. 2010–2015), Nigerian security officer
- Udeme Ekpeyong (born 1973), Nigerian sprinter
- Asuquo Ekpenyong (born 1985), Nigerian politician
- Keppy Ekpenyong, Nigerian actor
- Chris Ekpenyong (born 1954), Nigerian politician
- Nse Ekpenyong (born 1964), Nigerian politician
- Frank Ekpeyong, Nigerian politician
- Emmanuel Ekpeyong (born 2004), Nigerian footballer
- Janet Ekpeyong, Nigerian medical professional and public official
- Oku Ekpeyong, British campaigner
