= Ankara University =

Public university in Turkey

Coordinates: 39.9367°N 32.8303°E

- Ankara Üniversitesi
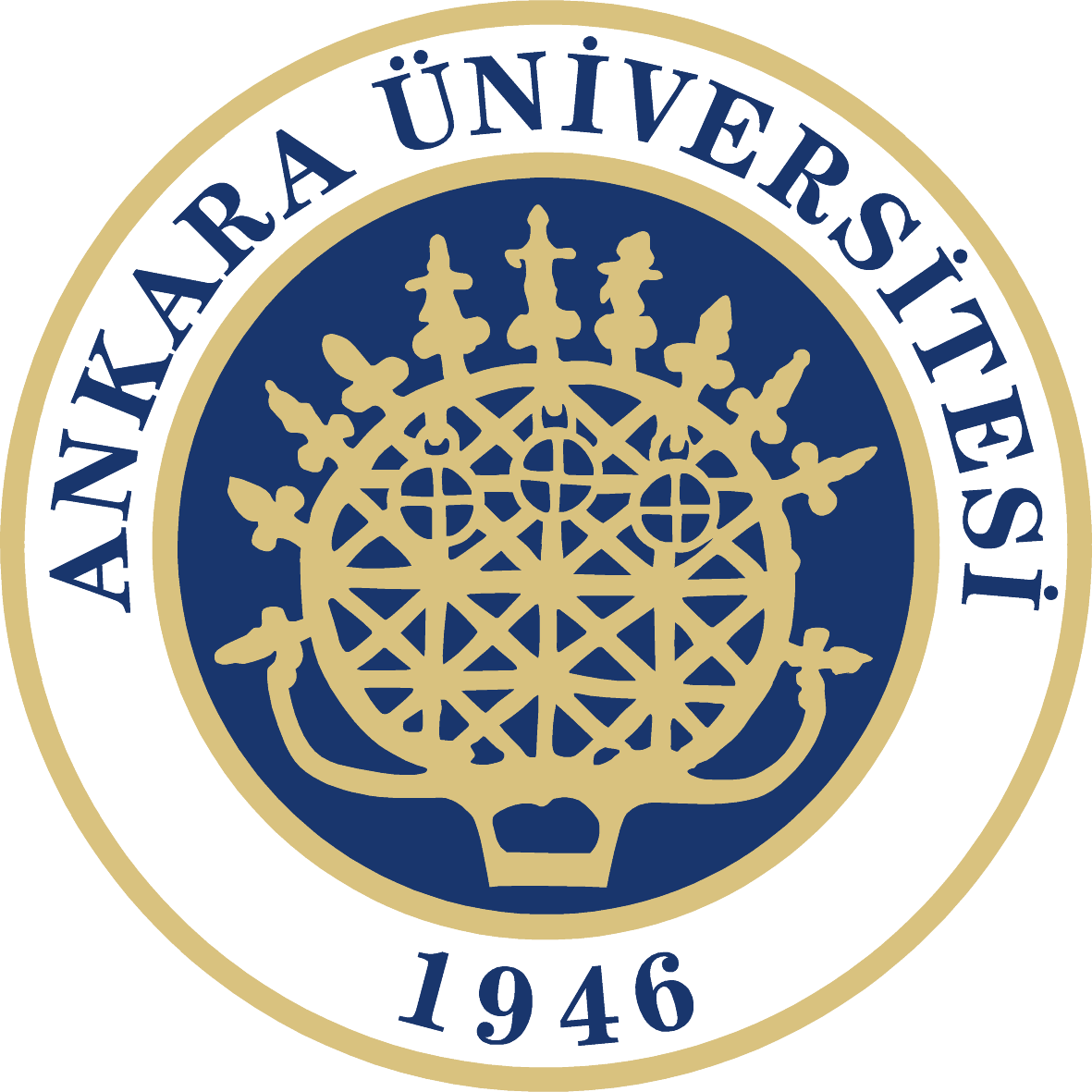
- Motto: Cumhuriyetin Bilim Güneşi (Turkish)
- Motto in English: Republic's Sun of Science
- Type: Public research university
- Established: 5 October 1925; 100 years ago as Ankara Hukuk Mektebi; 13 June 1946; 80 years ago as Ankara University
- Founder: Mustafa Kemal Atatürk
- Affiliations: EUA
- Rector: Necdet Ünüvar
- Faculty: 1,639
- Administrative staff: 5,527
- Students: 89,683
- Location: Ankara, Turkey
- Campus: Urban
- Language: Turkish, English
- Website: www.ankara.edu.tr

Ankara University (Turkish: Ankara Üniversitesi) is a public research university in Ankara, the capital of Turkey. It was the first higher education institution founded in Turkey after the formation of the Turkish republic in 1923.

== History ==
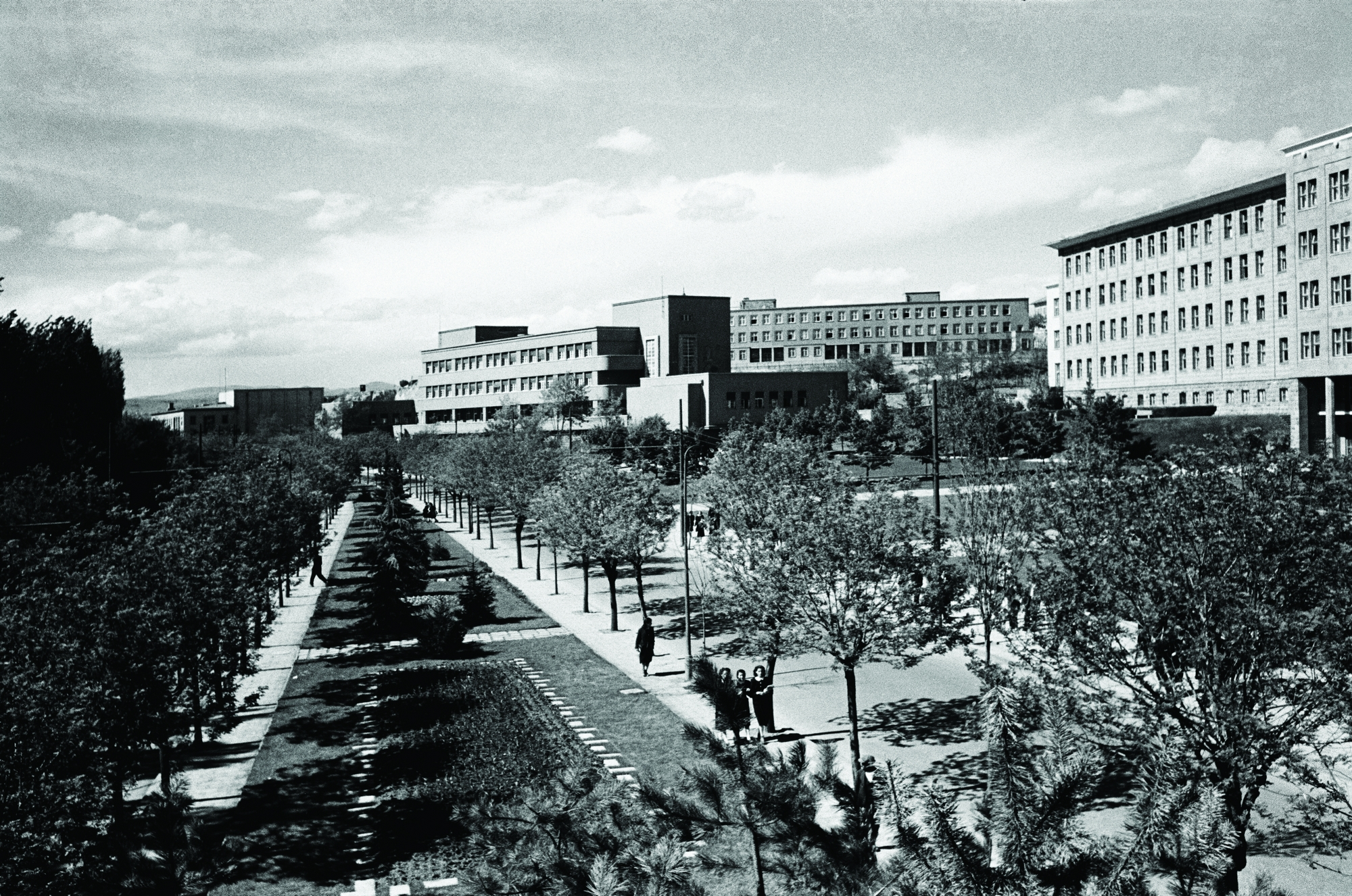
Ankara University Campus in 1940s

Ankara University was established by Mustafa Kemal Atatürk, the first president of Turkey, and is one of the country's leading educational institutions. The university's history dates back to the founding of the Faculty of Political Science in 1859, which was originally established in Istanbul as an institution to educate the Ottoman Empire's bureaucracy. The faculty underwent various transformations over time. Initially known as Mekteb-i Mülkiye-i Şahane under the Turkish Ministry of the Interior, it was later renamed Mekteb-i Mülkiye in 1918 under the Turkish Ministry of Education. Following the founding of the Republic, Atatürk requested that the school be relocated to Ankara, and it was subsequently renamed the School of Political Science. On March 23, 1950, it became the Faculty of Political Science, part of Ankara University. The faculty offers programs in Public Administration, Labor Economics, Business Administration, and International Relations.

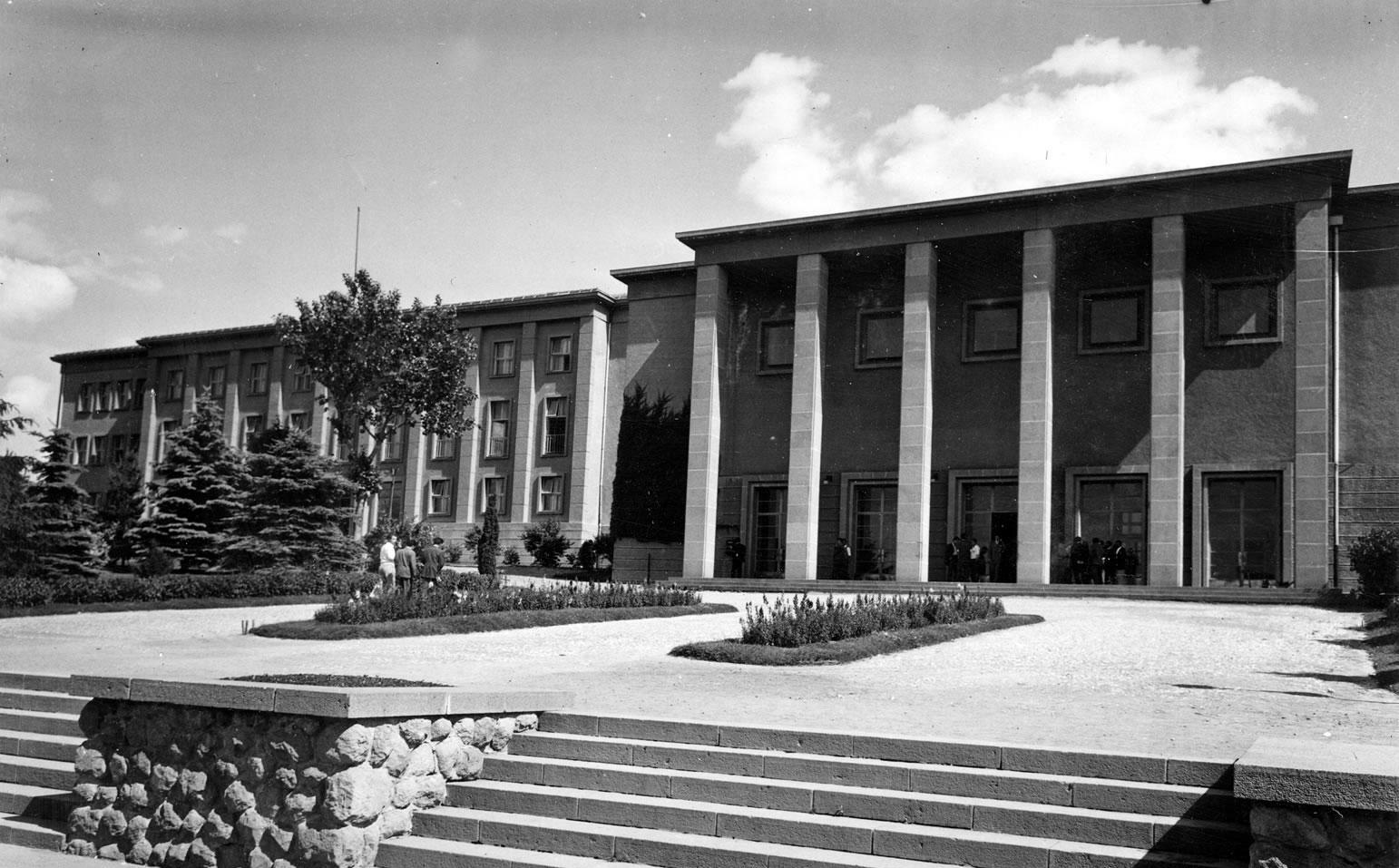
Ankara University Law School in 1940s

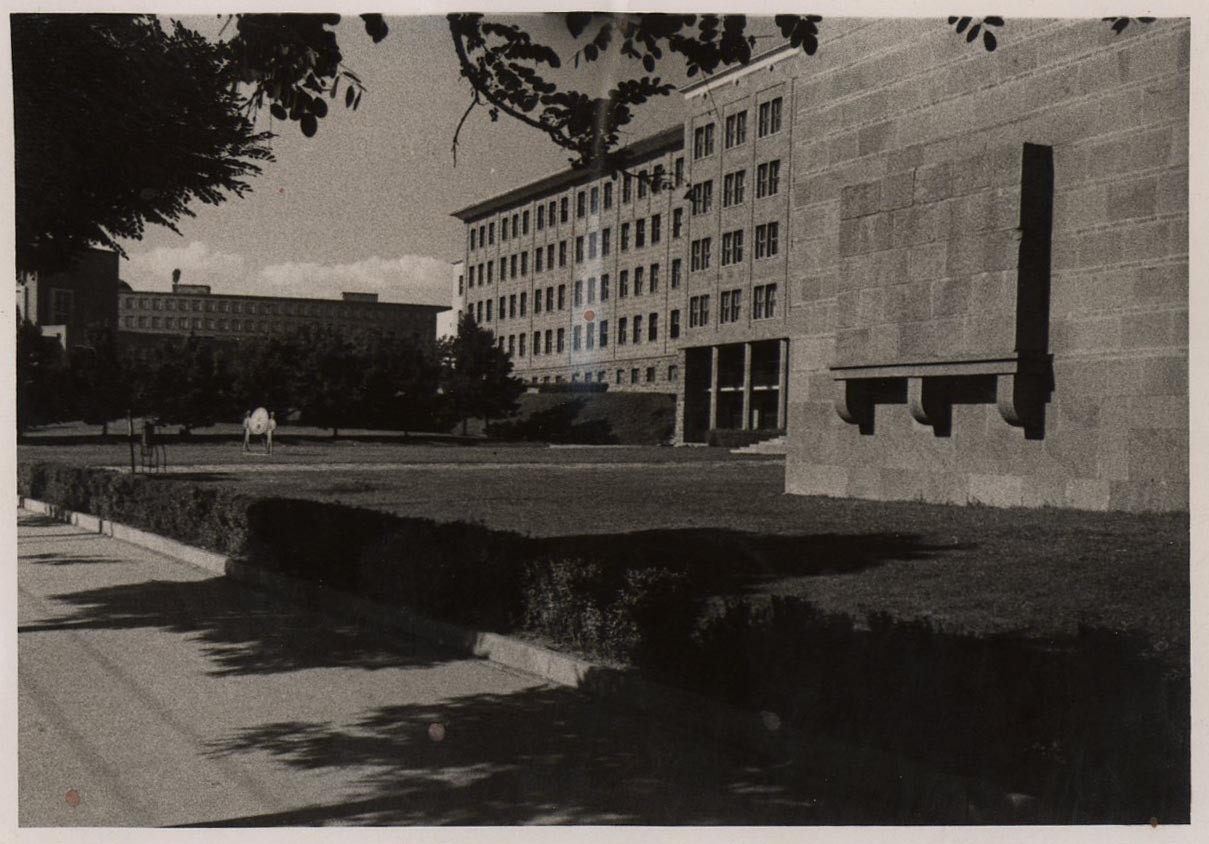
Ankara University School of Language and History – Geography

The university expanded over the years to include other faculties. The Ankara University Law School was founded in 1925, while the School of Language and History – Geography was established in 1935. In 1943, the Faculty of Science was founded, followed by the Faculty of Medicine in 1945. The Ankara University Faculty of Veterinary Medicine, which traces its origins to 1842, and the School of Divinity, founded in 1949, were also part of the university's early developments. The School of Pharmacy was established in 1960, followed by the Ankara University Faculty of Dentistry in 1963, which became a full faculty in 1977. The Faculty of Educational Sciences was founded in 1965, along with the Faculty of Communication, also known as İLEF. In 1996, the Çankırı Faculty of Forestry and the Health Education Faculty were opened. More recently, the Faculty of Fine Arts and the Faculty of Applied Sciences were established in 2015, and the Faculty of Open and Distance Education was founded in 2020. The university has 40 vocational programs, 120 undergraduate programs and 110 graduate programs.

== Research ==
Ankara University hosts a variety of research, application, and education centers that support its academic and scientific mission. As of the latest data, the university operates 41 such centers, each dedicated to specialized research and public service.

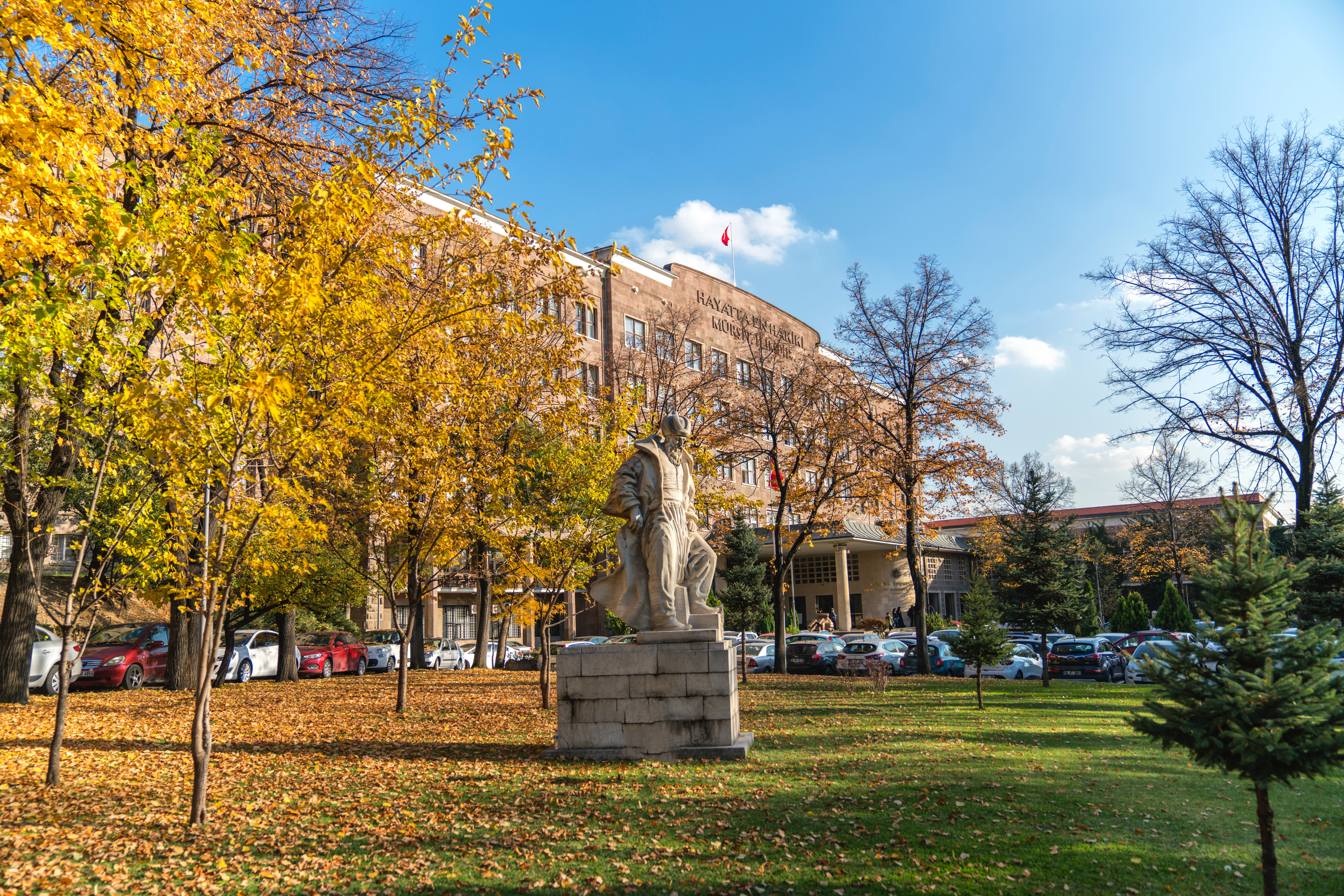
Ankara University Campus

One of the notable centers is the Turkish and Foreign Languages Research and Application Center, known as TÖMER, which was established in 1984. By 2014, TÖMER had expanded to include 11 branches across Turkey, with its central office located in Ankara. The center provides language instruction in a broad range of languages, including Turkish, English, German, French, Spanish, Italian, Russian, Korean, Japanese, Modern Greek, Dutch, Bulgarian, Chinese, Ottoman Turkish, Arabic, Polish, and the languages of the Central Asian Turkic Republics. The language offerings are subject to change based on demand and academic trends.

The Ankara University Kreiken Observatory, which began construction in 1959 and opened officially in 1963, is another key center. It provides significant contributions to astronomy, offering both scientific research opportunities and educational events for children, students, and the general public. The observatory also makes its facilities available to the public during important astronomical events.

The Ankara University Women Issues Research and Application Center (KASAUM), founded to address gender issues and the role of women in society, organizes research and educational programs. In 1996, the center launched the "Women Research" master's program to further support research in this field. Similarly, the Small Entrepreneurship Research and Application Center (KIGAUM) conducts research on small business entrepreneurship, offers educational programs for academics and entrepreneurs, and fosters partnerships with both local and international centers.

The Distance Education Center at Ankara University provides opportunities for students to pursue higher education remotely, offering both full degree programs and individual courses. The university also operates the Center of Excellence in Superconductivity Research (CESUR), which focuses on the study of superconducting materials such as MgB2, BSCCO, and YBCO, particularly for use in practical superconductivity technologies.

The Ankara University European Research Center (ATAUM), founded in 1987, is dedicated to promoting knowledge of the European Union and Turkey-EU relations. It engages in interdisciplinary research and training, contributing to a deeper understanding of the political and economic dynamics of the EU and its member states. Additionally, the Ankara University Center for Earthquake Research conducts independent studies on seismic activity, with a particular focus on the region surrounding Ankara and broader Turkey.

Several other specialized centers at the university include the Psychiatric Crisis Research and Application Center (PKUAM), which focuses on psychiatric crises, suicide prevention, and related public health issues. Established in 1987, PKUAM serves as a reference point for the World Health Organization. The Brain Research Center, founded in 2009, is another prominent research center, bringing together experts from diverse fields like linguistics, psychiatry, neurology, and electrical engineering to explore the human brain.

The Latin American Research and Application Center (LAMER), opened in 2009, conducts research into the political, economic, social, and cultural issues of Latin America. It aims to analyze the region's development and explore how its experiences might be applied in Turkey. Similarly, the Center for the Research of Child's Culture (ÇOKAUM), founded in 1994, focuses on research related to children's culture and organizes both national and international academic events. The Center for Research of South Eastern Europe (GAMER), established in 2009, addresses the cultural, historical, and economic aspects of the South Eastern European region.

In addition to these, the university operates the Center for the Research of Turkish Geography (TÜCAUM), which began its activities in 1990. TÜCAUM supports research on Turkish geography, compiles relevant data, and maintains an archive of materials related to Turkey's geographical studies. The Political Psychology Research and Application Center (POLPAUM) and the Center of Environmental Science also contribute to the university's diverse academic focus. Finally, the Old Age Research and Application Center (YASAM) works on issues related to aging and the welfare of older individuals, conducting research and publishing on the social, economic, health, and psychological conditions of the elderly.

== International perspective ==
University rankings

Global – Overall
- ARWU World: 801–900 (2023)
- QS World: =697 (2026)
- THE World: 1501+ (2024)
- USNWR Global: =722 (2023)

Regional – Overall
- QS Emerging Europe and Central Asia: 66 (2022)

The Department of Japanese Language and Literature was awarded the Japanese Foreign Minister's commendation for their contributions to promotion of Japanese language education in Turkey on December 1, 2020.

== Notable people ==
=== Faculty ===
- Hasan Reşit Tankut, Turkish politician and historian

=== Notable alumni ===
- Barış Akin – General surgeon
- Bülent Arınç – Politician and former speaker of the parliament
- Tomris Bakır – Archaeologist
- Deniz Baykal – Politician and party leader
- Ataol Behramoglu – Poet and university lecturer
- Akın Birdal – Politician
- Osman Birsen – Former CEO of Istanbul Stock Exchange
- Deniz Çakır – Actor
- Cengiz Çandar – Journalist
- Mevlüt Çavuşoğlu – Diplomat and politician; former Minister of Foreign Affairs of Turkey
- Mustafa Ceceli – Singer
- Şirin Cemgil – Lawyer
- Hikmet Çetin – Former speaker of the Parliament
- Mehmet Culum – Novelist
- Can Dündar – Journalist
- İsmail Hakkı Duru – Theoretical physicist
- Muammer Güler – Governor of Istanbul
- Aydın Güven Gürkan – Academic and socialist party leader
- Ekmeleddin Ihsanoglu – Former secretary-general of the Organisation of the Islamic Conference
- Erdal İnönü – Academic and politician
- Mustafa Kalemli – Physician and politician
- Ahmet Taner Kışlalı – Intellectual and former government minister
- Hayri Kozakçıoğlu – Province governor and politician
- Ferit Melen – Former prime minister
- Adnan Menderes – Former prime minister
- Murathan Mungan – Author
- Tahsin Özgüç – Archaeologist
- Ahmet Necdet Sezer - President of Turkey (2000–2007)
- Cemal Süreya – Poet
- Murat Karayalçın – Former Minister for Foreign Affairs; former Deputy Prime Minister and former Mayor of Ankara
- Hasan Celal Güzel – Former Minister of National Education
- Mehmet Hakkı Suçin - Author, Arabist, academic, and literary translator
- Selahattin Demirtaş – Politician
- İlber Ortaylı – Historian
- Metin Feyzioğlu – Lawyer
- Halil İnalcık – Historian
- İhsan Doğramacı – Physician and university founder
- Ahmet Taner Kışlalı – Politician
- Engin Akyürek – Actor
- Mehmet Görmez – Academic
- Melih Gökçek – Politician
- Mehmet Şimşek – Politician
- Beşir Atalay – Politician
- Abdullah Öcalan – Kurdistan Workers' Party leader and political thinker
- Doğu Perinçek – Politician
- Mehmet Haberal – Physician and founder of Başkent University
- Cüneyt Özdemir – Journalist
- Mithat Sancar – Politician
- Metin Altıok – Poet
- Ahmed Arif – Poet
- Ayşenur İslam – Politician
- Selma Aliye Kavaf – Politician
- Sezai Karakoç – Author and poet
- Suat Kılıç – Politician
- Ece Temelkuran – Author
- Mehmet Bekaroğlu – Physician and politician
- Çetin Altan – Author and politician
- Sırrı Süreyya Önder – Politician
- Haluk Koç -– Politician
- Mustafa Kamalak -– Saadet Party leader
- Merve Kavakçı -– Politician
- Muammer Güler – Politician
- Kartal Tibet – Screenwriter
- Mehmet Mehdi Eker – Politician
- Sema Ramazanoğlu – Politician
- Naci Bostancı – Politician
- Sadullah Ergin – Politician
- Emine Ülker Tarhan – Politician
- Abdülkadir Aksu – Politician
- Mustafa Elitaş – Politician
- Altan Erkekli – Theatre actor
- Adalet Ağaoğlu – Author
- Bülent Ecevit – Politician
- Hakim Muhammad Said – Pedical researcher, scholar, philanthropist, and Governor of Sindh Province, Pakistan from 1993 until 1996
- Abdüllatif Şener – Politician, former Deputy Prime Minister and former Minister of Finance
- Adnan Sezgin – Former soccer player and businessman
- Tuluhan Tekelioğlu – Journalist, writer and documentary film producer
- Tülay Tuğcu – Former chief justice of the Supreme Court of Turkey
- Hamdi Ulukaya – Owner, founder, chairman, and CEO of Chobani
- Gazi Yaşargil – Physician
- Muhsin Yazıcıoğlu – Politician
- Mesut Yılmaz – Politician
- Halil Ergün – Actor
- Selda Bağcan – Singer and songwriter
- Muhsin Yazıcıoğlu – Politician
- Mesut Yılmaz – Politician
- Barış Falay – Actor

== See also ==
- Faculty of Political Science, Ankara University
- Ankara University, Law School
- Ankara University Medical School
- Ankara University Faculty of Dentistry
- School of Language and History – Geography
- Ankara University Faculty of Veterinary Medicine
- Ankara University Observatory
- List of universities in Ankara
- List of universities in Turkey
- YÖK
