= Başkent =

Başkent can refer to:

- Başkent, Aziziye
- Başkent University
- Başkent Yıldızları
- Başkent Volleyball Hall
- Başkent University Medical and Research Center of Alanya
