= Experimental and Clinical Transplantation =

- Discipline: Organ transplantation
- Language: English
- Edited by: Mehmet Haberal

Publication details
- History: 1987–present
- Frequency: Bimonthly

Standard abbreviations
- ISO 4: Exp. Clin. Transplant.

Indexing
- ISSN: 1304-0855 (print); 2146-8427 (web)

Links
- Journal homepage

Experimental and Clinical Transplantation is the official journal of the Middle East Society for Organ Transplantation. The scope of the journal includes surgical techniques, innovations, immunobiology and immunosuppression, clinical results and complications. Its editor-in-chief is Mehmet Haberal and there are six issues per year. Its policy is to ensure that all authors of its articles adhere to the rules and regulations stated in the Declaration of Istanbul and by the Committee on Publication Ethics.
