= Refaat R. Kamel =

Egyptian surgeon

Refaat R. Kamel is an Egyptian surgeon and past world president of the International College of Surgeons. He is one of the surgeons depicted in Henry Ward's 2010 painting ‘’The 'Finger-Assisted' Nephrectomy of Professor Nadey Hakim’’. He was elected president of the Middle East Society for Organ Transplantation (MESOT) for 2018 to 2020.
