= Ekwele Agube =

Nigerian politician

Commissioner for Sustainable Development, Cross River State
- In office January 2023 – May 2023
- Governor: Ben Ayade

Personal details
- Occupation: Public administrator

Ekwele Agube is a Nigerian politician who served as the Commissioner for Sustainable Development in Cross River State. She was appointed in January 2023 as part of a cabinet reshuffle by Governor Ben Ayade and served until the end of that administration's tenure.

== Personal life ==
Ekwele is married to Ignatius Agube, a Court of Appeal judge in Cross Rivers State.

== Appointment ==
Ekwele was among thirteen commissioners sworn in by Governor Ben Ayade at the Cross River State Executive Council ceremony held in January 2023. Her portfolio covered Sustainable Development, a ministry focused on coordinating social and economic development initiatives within the state.

== Abduction ==
In July 2020, Ekwele, was kidnapped from her shop in Calabar, Cross River State. Her personal assistant, Glory Akpama, was shot and later died. Ekwele Agube was released on 18 July 2020 following police operations, and the suspects were subsequently arrested with firearms recovered.

== See also ==
- Executive Council of Cross River State
