= Arno A. Roscher =

German professor of pathology

Arno A. Roscher is a German professor of pathology at the Keck School of Medicine of USC and fellow of the International College of Surgeons. The Dr. Arno A. Roscher Endowed Lecture, established in 2009, is given in his name. He is one of the surgeons depicted in Henry Ward's 2010 painting The 'Finger-Assisted' Nephrectomy of Professor Nadey Hakim.
