= Adel Ramzy =

Egyptian surgeon

Adel Ramzy is an Egyptian surgeon who served as the World President of the International College of Surgeons in 2014. He is one of the surgeons depicted in Henry Ward's painting ‘’The 'Finger-Assisted' Nephrectomy of Professor Nadey Hakim’’.
