= Earl Owen =

Australian microsurgeon

Earl Ronald Owen AO (1934–2014) was an Australian microsurgeon and classical music specialist who led or assisted in many pioneering achievements in the field of microsurgery, including many "world firsts", such as the world's first finger reattachment, vasectomy reversal, fallopian tubal ligation, hand transplant, double-hand transplant and face transplant.

== Early life ==
Born in 1934, Owen's childhood was overshadowed by medical problems, beginning when he underwent radiation therapy to treat a tumour on his leg, which weakened his bones causing them to break when he was aged 11. Enduring multiple failed operations, Owen said he grew to hate his surgeon but the experience inspired him to be a doctor who carefully planned and researched operations before performing surgery.

== Medical career ==
Owen studied at Cranbrook School, Sydney and the University of Sydney where he graduated in 1958. He then commenced work at the Royal Prince Alfred Hospital in Sydney and The Alfred Hospital in Melbourne as a trainee surgeon. During the 1960s, Owen worked in London as a senior registrar at the Great Ormond Street Hospital, during which time he also obtained additional medical degrees and began research into microsurgery. In 1965, he visited Germany to work with microscope maker Carl Zeiss AG.

=== Finger Reattachment ===
Upon returning to Australia in 1970, Owen commenced working at the Royal Alexandra Hospital for Children, where he made the first of many significant breakthroughs when he successfully reattached a young boy's severed finger. The boy's parents had brought the finger, which had been accidentally chopped off with an axe, to the hospital in a bag. Owen decided to attempt to reattach the finger by sewing the nerve endings together with a needle under a microscope. To do this, Owen disobeyed orders by the head of the hospital who had refused to allow the operation to proceed. After successfully performing Australia's first finger reattachment, Owen was promptly dismissed for insubordination.

Following his dismissal, Owen went onto work with the Prince of Wales Hospital, where he became head of the hospital's microsurgery unit.

Owen continued to develop his microsurgical skills, being the first surgeon to perform vasectomy reversals and complete fallopian tubal ligations.

=== Hand Transplant ===
In 1998, Owen and Jean-Michel Dubernard headed up a team to perform what would be the world's first successful hand transplant, which consisted of a groundbreaking 13-hour operation at the Edouard Herriot Hospital in Lyon, where a deceased motorcycle accident victim's hand was transplanted onto the arm of New Zealander Clint Hallam who had lost his hand in a circular saw accident 14 years prior while serving a prison sentence for fraud.

Although the operation was a success and the hand initially moved well, Hallam appealed for the hand to be amputated in 2001 claiming it felt like a dead man's hand with no feeling in it. Doctors who had performed the transplant accused Hallam of failing to complete the full course of anti-rejection drugs and not exercising enough, which Hallam denied. Owen described the amputation as "inevitable" due to Hallam's failure to keeping up the required physiotherapy and accused Hallam of failing to follow the plan he had agreed to prior to the transplant.

Owen had previously been critical of Hallam's behaviour and attitude following the transplant. When an arrest warrant was issued for Hallam in May 2000 in connection to a fuel card scam, Owen inferred in a radio interview that he was beginning to regret his choice of patient for such a pioneering operation, claiming not to know of Hallam's criminal history and accusing Hallam of being only interested in making media appearances for financial gain.

=== Double Hand Transplant ===
In 2000, Owen and Dubernard again led a team to perform what would be the world's first successful double hand transplant, which consisted of a 17-hour operation at the Edouard Herriot Hospital in Lyon, where a donor's hands and part of their forearms were transplanted onto the arms of a French man. The man had previously had both arms amputated below the elbows following an accident involving an amateur rocket which had exploded causing severe injuries.

=== Face Transplant ===
Owen trained the French surgeons who performed the world's first partial face transplant in 2005 on Isabelle Dinoire, a French woman who had been attacked by her own dog. The surgeons had a four month-wait for a reasonably matched face from a donor with a similar age, the same blood group, tissue type and skin colour. Upon a match being found, Owen was unable to arrive in France in time for the operation, having decided it would be disrespectful to keep the brain-dead donor on life support while he made the journey from Australia. However, Owen kept in constant communication with the operating team who conducted the 15-hour operation at a hospital in Amiens.

== Music ==
During his younger years, Owen showed promise as an aspiring classical pianist, winning a piano competition when he was 14 and attracting the attention of Solomon who invited Owen to study under him. After realising Owen's medical ambitions, Solomon urged Owen to choose to concentrate on either music or medicine.

Music remained a huge part of Owen's life. He lectured in the music department of the University of Sydney and advised a number of the major symphony orchestras in Australia. Owen established a medical clinic for musicians in Sydney during the 1970s and was a director of the International Society for the Study of Tension in Performance, at the Institute of Performing Arts Medicine in London. He was known for playing classical music everywhere, including in the operating theatre.

Owen's passion for both music and medicine sometimes combined.

While working in London in the 1960s, Owen formed a friendship with renowned Russian classical musician Vladimir Ashkenazy. When Ashkenazy's son Dimitri seriously injured his leg when it was sliced open by a boat propeller while waterskiing in 1979, Ashkenazy contacted Owen. Ashkenazy had been told by Greek doctors that they would amputate his son's leg due to the propeller severing arteries, nerves and tendons. Owen, however, convinced the surgeon to temporarily stabilise the boy's condition with an artificial artery and skin graft which would enable him to be shipped to Australia, where Owen could operate. When the boy arrived, Owen and his team at the Mater Hospital in Sydney worked on the leg for ten hours, rebuilding it. Dimitri made a full recovery and is now an internationally renowned clarinetist.

In 1985, he and Melbourne plastic surgeon Hunter Fry wrote a paper on how many classical musicians suffer from repetitive strain injury, requiring them to either take time off or stop playing completely. Their paper was presented to the International Congress of Rheumatology at the University of Sydney in May 1985.

== Design ==
Owen also displayed an interest in ergonomic design, heading up a company that designed chairs for dental clinics. Owen is also credited with designing some of the chairs at the Sydney Opera House.

== Honours ==
In 1978, Owen was named "Microsurgeon of the Year" at the World Microsurgey Congress held in San Francisco.

Owen was announced as an officer of the Order of Australia on the Queen's Birthday Honours list in 1980.

In 2007, Owen received the Legion d'Honneur for services to French surgery.

Owen was depicted as one of the surgeons in Henry Ward’s painting The finger-assisted nephrectomy, unveiled in 2010 and exhibited at the National Portrait Gallery, London.

== Death ==
Earl Owen died at the age of 80 on 22 May 2014 in Sydney.
