= Rocco Maruotti =

Rocco Maruotti is a Professor of surgery and Chief editor of the Italian journal of surgery Chirurgia and is one of the surgeons depicted in Henry Ward's 2010 painting The 'Finger-Assisted' Nephrectomy of Professor Nadey Hakim. Maruotti's essay on "Ethics, Surgeons, and Transplantation" was presented at one of the Science and Democracy conferences in Italy, a forum that frequently discusses issues critical of conventional ideas. The essay was subsequently published in Marco Mamone Capria's Science and the Citizen: Contemporary Issues and Controversies.
