= Ankara University Faculty of Dentistry =

Educational institution in Ankara

- Ankara Üniversitesi Diş Hekimliği Fakültesi
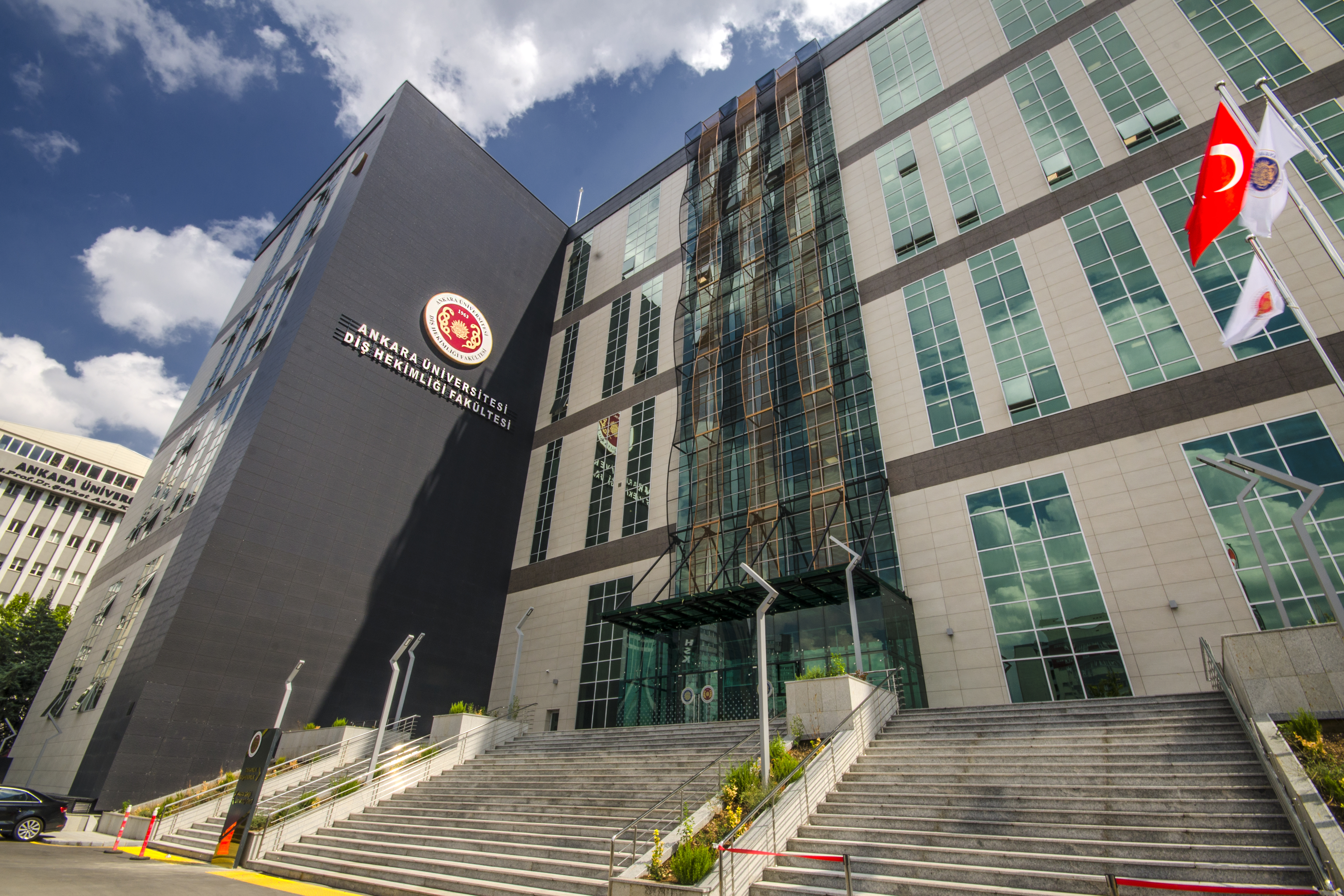
- A view from the AU Faculty of Dentistry
- Type: Public
- Established: 1953; 73 years ago
- Parent institution: Ankara University
- Dean: Kaan Orhan
- Location: Beşevler, Ankara, Turkey
- Campus: Urban
- Language: Turkish, English
- Website: dentistry.ankara.edu.tr

Ankara University Faculty of Dentistry is a school of dental medicine affiliated with Ankara University, is located at the university's Beşevler Campus. It offers a five-year undergraduate program. The mediums of instruction are Turkish and English.

== History ==
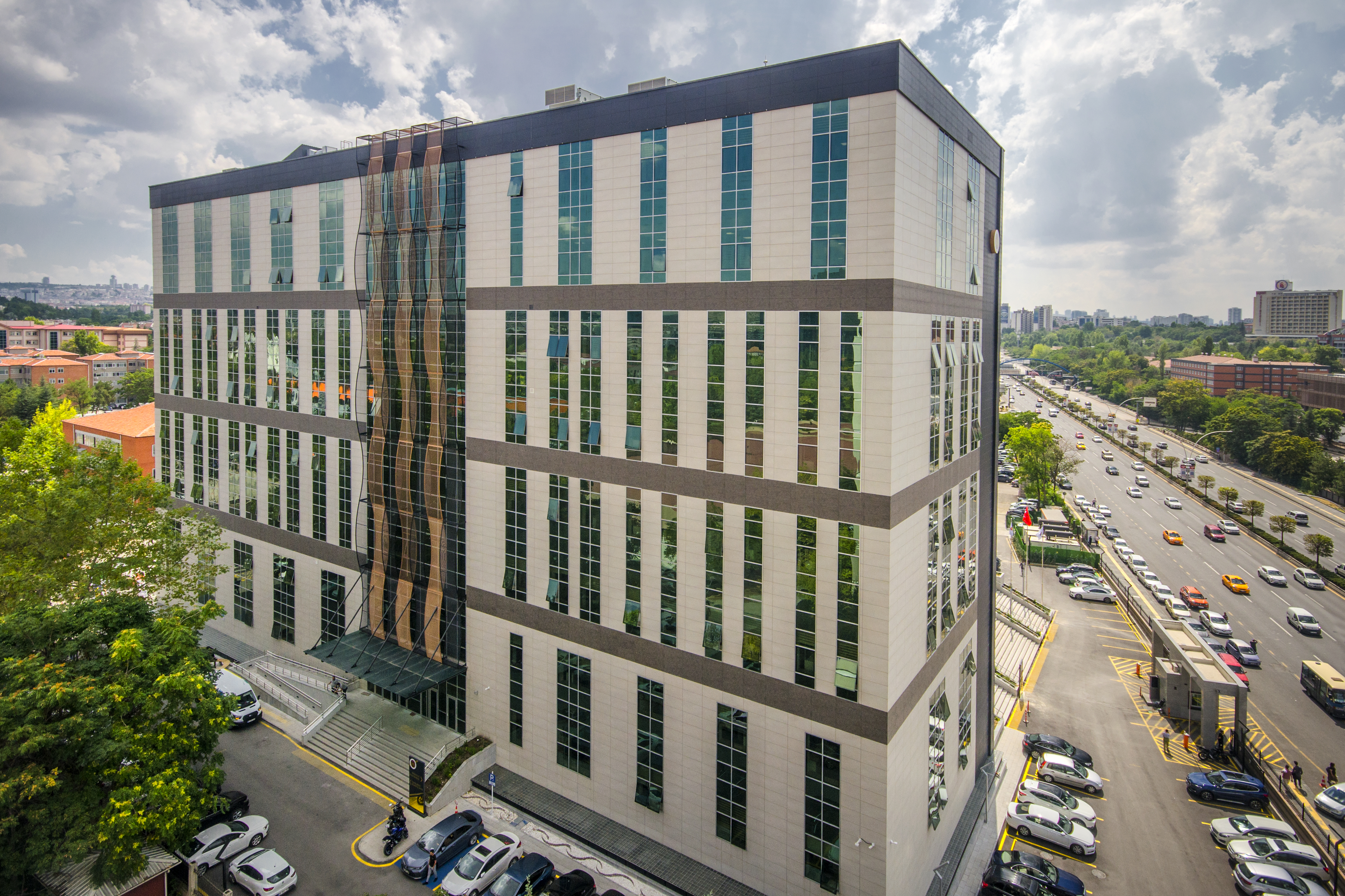
Aerial view of the Ankara University Faculty of Dentistry

Studies for the establishment of the Ankara University Faculty of Dentistry began in 1959. A decision to create a school of dentistry was made during a meeting of the board of professors on March 15, 1959, under the leadership of Zafer Paykoç, then dean of the Ankara University Faculty of Medicine. A commission was formed to draft a law based on the report they prepared. This draft was approved by the board and forwarded to the Ankara University Senate. However, progress was halted due to the 1960 Turkish coup d'état.

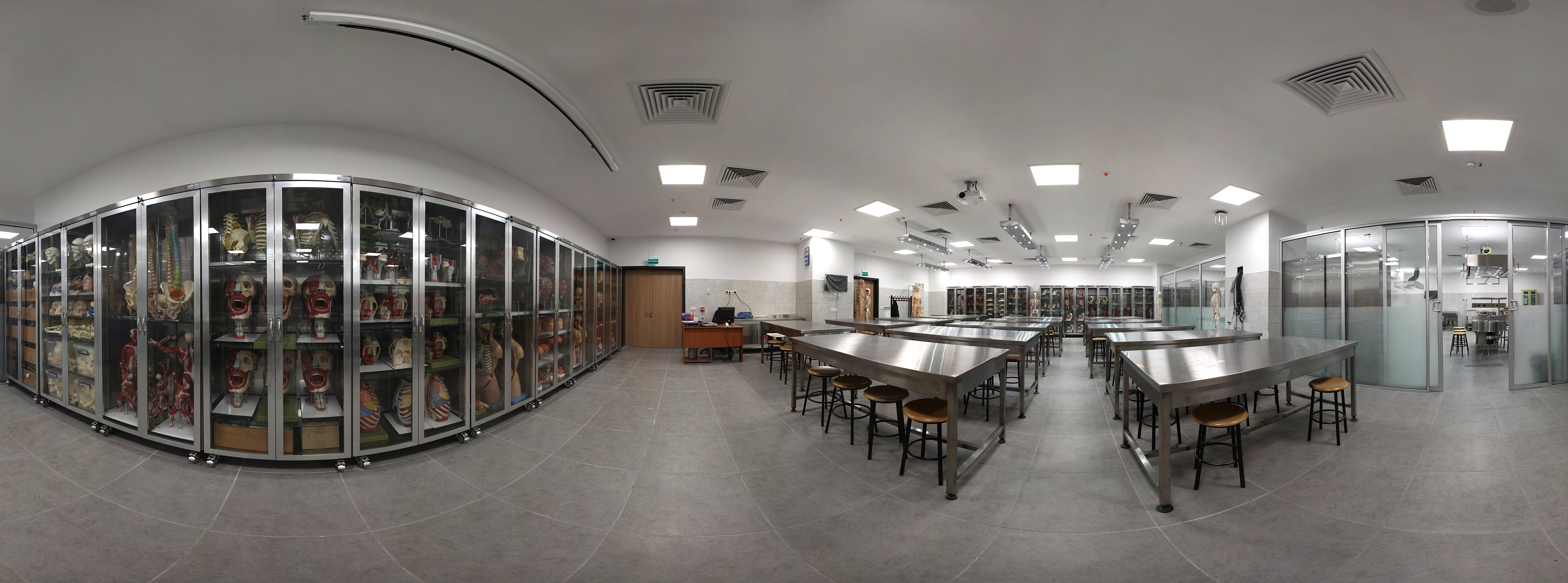
Anatomy Laboratory at the Ankara University Faculty of Dentistry

In September 1963, at the request of the Ankara University Faculty of Medicine Board of Professors, a new report was prepared by Cihat Borçbakan, Professor of Maxillofacial and Plastic Surgery at the Gülhane Military Medical Academy and a lecturer of maxillofacial surgery at the Ankara University Faculty of Medicine Ear Nose and Throat Clinic. The regulations approving the college were published in the Official Gazette in December 1963 under number 11581 and were subsequently enacted.
