= George Fayad =

British surgeon

- Born: December 1963 (age 62)
- Occupation: Otolaryngologist
- Known for: Rhinoplasty; Ear-pinning
- Medical career
- Profession: Rhinologist
- Field: Ear, nose and throat
- Institutions: Basildon and Thurrock University Hospitals NHS Foundation Trust
- Sub-specialties: Otolaryngology
- Website: Official website

George Fayad FRCS, FICS, (born December 1963) is an ear nose and throat surgeon, who introduced the use of nasal titanium implants in the UK to open up the nasal valve and improve breathing in people with nasal valve dysfunction. In addition to general conditions of the ear, nose and throat, he treats snoring, sleep problems and vertigo. He also performs the operation of ear-pinning without an incision. He is chairman of the ENT department at the Basildon and Thurrock University Hospitals NHS Foundation Trust and head of the allergy clinic at Basildon Hospital.

He is one of the surgeons depicted in Henry Ward's 2010 painting The 'Finger-Assisted' Nephrectomy of Professor Nadey Hakim.

== Career ==
Fayad completed his training in general medicine in Belgium and France, following which he trained in the specialty of ear, nose and throat (ENT) in Europe and the United States. He was later appointed consultant in 1996 and became chairman of the ENT department at the Basildon and Thurrock University Hospitals NHS Foundation Trust and head of the allergy clinic at Basildon Hospital, where he runs a clinic that treats combined allergies and asthma, advocating the examination of the nose in those people with asthma. In addition to general conditions of the ear, nose and throat, he treats snoring, sleep problems and vertigo. He also performs the operation of ear-pinning without making an incision.

In 2008 he was elected Governor of the International College of Surgeons.

In 2009, with Ailleen Cunningham, Fayad introduced the Breathe-Implant, a titanium nasal implant, to the UK to open up the nasal valve and improve breathing in people with nasal valve dysfunction, six years after its invention by Swiss surgeon D.F. à Wengen.

He is one of the surgeons depicted in Henry Ward's painting The 'Finger-Assisted' Nephrectomy of Professor Nadey Hakim (2010), which was included in the 2010 BP Portrait Awards exhibition at the National Portrait Gallery.

== Honours and memberships ==
Fayad is a fellow of the European Academy of Facial Plastic Surgery, the Portmann Society of Otolaryngology and the Royal Society of Medicine, London. He is a fellow and governor of International College of Surgeons and his memberships include the American Academy of Oto-Laryngology, the British Association of ENT Surgeons, the British Rhinological Society, and the British Sleep Society.

== Selected publications ==
- Chapter 8. "Cochlear Implant" co-authored with Bread Elmiyeh, in Artificial Organs edited by Nadey Hakim, Springer, (2009) ISBN 9781848822818
- "Outcomes of a Novel Titanium Nasal Implant for Nasal Valve Dysfunction". Co-authored with Aileen Cunningham, Otolaryngology–Head and Neck Surgery 2 September 2011. vol. 145, 2_suppl: pp. P126. doi:10.1177/0194599811416318a271
