= Lawrencia Ita =

Nigerian politician

Lawrencia Effiong Ita

Commissioner for Establishments, Training and Pensions, Cross River State
- Incumbent
- Assumed office 2023

Personal details
- Party: Non-partisan (public official)
- Occupation: Public administrator

Lawrencia Effiong Ita is a Nigerian politician serving as the Commissioner for Establishments, Training and Pensions in Cross River State. She was appointed to the position in 2023 as part of the executive council of Governor Bassey Otu.

== Political career ==
As Commissioner for Establishments, Training and Pensions, Ita has been involved in initiatives to modernise the state civil service, including the rollout of staff orientation workshops and capacity-building programmes for newly employed civil servants.

In September 2026, Hon. Ita was elected as the Financial Secretary of the Cross River State Commissioners’ Forum.

She has also participated in broader state government efforts to strengthen local government autonomy and workforce development through staff training initiatives, attending induction and training workshops for local government service personnel alongside other state officials.

Lawrencia served as the vice chairman of Bakassi local government area, cross Rivers State, from 2020 to 2023.

== See also ==
- Executive Council of Cross River State
