= Tuluhan Tekelioğlu =

- Born: 5 March 1970 (age 56); Tours, France
- Education: Journalism
- Alma mater: Ankara University
- Occupations: Journalist, television presenter, documentary filmmaker
- Years active: 1992 - present
- Spouse: Ömer Murat Gülkan (m. 1995–2013)

Tuluhan Tekelioğlu (born 5 March 1970) is a Turkish writer, documentary filmmaker and former journalist, television anchorwoman, and talk show host.

== Early life ==
Tuluhan Tekelioğlu was born in Tours, France, on 5 March 1970, while her father Yavuz Tekelioğlu was conducting his doctoral study at University of Montpellier 1. She was born into a family of modern women with a sense of social responsibility. Her maternal grandmother was a co-founder of the "Association of Progressive Women" (Turkish: İlerici Kadınlar Derneği). Her aunt was jailed for two years in the Mamak Military Prison, Ankara, in 1984 after the 1980 military coup because she defended the human rights for women. Her father is a retired professor at Akdeniz University, and specialist for geographical indication. Her brother Balkan, born in 1978, lives and works in France.

Tekelioğlu was educated in communications at Ankara University. After graduation with a journalism degree in 1992, she went to France for a Master's degree in economics. She met journalist Gökşin Sipahioğlu there, and left her studies unfinished.

In 1995, Tekelioğlu married stockbroker Ömer Murat Gülkan. She gave birth to their son Ömer in 1999. In 2011, she filed for divorce, which was finalized in 2013 after two years of separation.

== Professional career ==
=== Journalist ===
During her time in Paris, Tekelioğlu started her journalist career in 1992 joining the Sipa Press, which Gökşin Sipahioğlu founded. She returned to Turkey after two years of work in the agency. Between 1994 and 2001, she worked for the daily Hürriyet. During this time, she served as a volunteer at the Kakuma UNHCR refugee camp in Kenya while serving as a correspondent for her newspaper in Turkey. She published her experiences in Kenya in an article series in the newspaper. In 2007, she began reporting for the newspaper Sabah on Saturdays under the title "Her Şeye Rağmen İkimiz" ("We Two Despite Everything"), which focused on married couples' life. She later published this report series in a book with the same title.

=== Television presenter ===
In 2001, Tekelioğlu transferred to the Turkey's first subscription-based television channel Cine5 to present her pr"ogram "Başka Yerde Yok" ("Not At Any Other Place"). From 2001 to 2003, she was with Habertürk TV presenting "Tatlı Sert" ("Sweet Hard"), and then for the TGRT TV, the program "Tuluhan'la Her Sabah" ("Every Morning With Tuluhan"). After a proposal by the notable journalist and television commentator Mehmet Ali Birand (1941–2013), she moved to Kanal D, where she became an anchorwoman for the morning news program serving between 2005 and 2006. She was next at Kanal 1, presenting the morning news program "Güzel 1 Gün" ("A Beautiful Day"). During this time, she raised funds for ten thousand books to be donated to primary schools in rural parts of eastern Turkey as in Siverek and Viranşehir, both in Şanlıurfa Province, and also initiated the foundation of libraries in Malatya. In 2009, she presented the program "Boğaziçi’nden" (""From the Bosphorus) at the state-owned TV channel TRT 2.

=== Documentary filmmaker ===
Tekelioğlu shot a documentary video on contemporary arts titled "Ayaküstü Cevaplar" ("Answers in Standing") interviewing 150 people in two years. The video was played at the arts gallery of Milli Reasürans ("National Reassurance Company") in 2008.

In 2009, Tekelioğlu made the documentary film "40’ında 40 kadın" ("40 Women at Age 40") about forty women living in different quarters of Istanbul. The content of the documentary film was transformed into a book by the Turkuaz Publishing the same year. In later years, the book's new editions were published, and a DVD version of the documentary film was released. Supported by the Women's Council of the Union of Chambers and Commodity Exchanges of Turkey (TOBB), the documentary film ran on 8 March 2011, the International Women's Day, in all 81 provinces of Turkey attracting great interest. The İZ TV aired the documentary film as well.

In 2012, Tekelioğlu shot the documentary film "50’sinde Erkek" ("Men at 50") based on interviews with 23 males. It was the first ever sociological study on males conducted in Turkey. The film was aired by İZ TV, and received wide interest.

The idea for the creating of Tekelioğlu's third documentary film "Yeni Hayat" ("New Life") emerged as she accompanied her father at the Medical Park Hospital in Antalya, where he underwent a bypass surgery. She stayed one month in the hospital with her father before, during, and after the surgery. During this time, she learned that around 30 percent of all the organ transplantations in Turkey are performed in that city. Her film documents the life of patients awaiting organ donation for transplantation before, during, and following the surgery. In an interview with a daily in 2014, she noted that "the rate of organ donation in Turkey is 3 to one million while the average rate in the world is 17 to one million". The film premiered at the 51st Antalya Golden Orange Film Festival.

Tekelioğlu directed the documentary "Persona non Grata", Latin for "person not appreciated", produced by Punto24, a platform for independent journalism. The film features fired journalists who remained unemployed. Its premiere took place on 3 May 2015, World Press Freedom Day. Tekelioğlu had lost her job at the newspaper Hürriyet in 2001 without knowing the reason. She was fired from the government-aligned daily Sabah after six years due to sharing news from the Agence France-Presse (AFP) on Twitter related to Gezi Park protests and Recep Tayyip Erdoğan. She recounted that event in her book "Ya Bizdensin Ya Da..." ("You Are Either On Our Side Or ...").

Another Tekelioğlu documentary film is the 2016-produced "Üvey Evlat" ("Step Child"), which is about the suppression and censorship of the artists by the political regime in Turkey. A number of notable artists, including Genco Erkal, Müjdat Gezen, Şebnem Sönmez, Levent Üzümcü, Sunay Akın, Mehmet Aksoy, Fazıl Say, Ahmet Ümit, Füsun Demirel and Zülfü Livaneli, tell their experience in the 52-minute documentary.

In 2018, Tekelioğlu produced the documentary film "Yapabilirsin" ("You Can Do It!"), which is about women who encourage Turkish society and give hope in difficult times to change from traditional roles imposed on them. "They are courageous enough to light a candle every time when they face darkness, and they do it without struggling with males," says Tekelioğlu for her film characters. The film received loud applause from the audience at the Strasbourg International Film Festival. The "Bridge to Türkiye Fund" (BTF), an organization of Turkish women in the United States, brought the documentary to the United States, and made its run in eleven cities including New York City, Boston, Portland, Oregon, and Chicago, as well as in the states of Minnesota and Washington in the context of the 2018 International Women's Day. The box office ticket sales revenue was used by the American BTF and the Turkish Association for the Support of Contemporary Living (Turkish: Çağdaş Yaşamı Destekleme Derneği, ÇYDD) for funding the scholarships of 80 Turkish girls. A book version of "Yapabilirsin" was published as well.

In her efforts to produce documentary films, Tekelioğlu is often assisted by her brother Balkan Tekelioğlu, who lives in France and is in the advertising business. During post-shooting, her brother assists her with the montage sequence.

== Awards ==
Tekelioğlu was awarded the "Best Talk Show Host Prize" by the Turkish "Radio and Television Journalists Association" for her program "Başka Yerde Yok" ("Not At Any Other Place") aired at the television channel Cine5.

Tekelioğlu's 2018 documentary film "Yapabilirsin" ("You Can Do It!") was awarded the "Best Film on Women Special Prize" by the International Flying Broom Film Festival. It was named the "Film of the Year" by the "Cinema4aCause" of Turkish entrepreneurs living in the United States.

== Bibliography ==
- Yapabilirsin (in Turkish) (1st ed.). Kara Karga. 2018. p. 176. ISBN 978-605-224-109-7.
- Üvey Evlat (in Turkish) (1st ed.). Kırmızı Kedi. 2017. p. 200. ISBN 978-605-298-065-1.
- Ya Bizdensin Ya da... (in Turkish) (1st ed.). Kırmızı Kedi. 2015. p. 234. ISBN 978-605-979-957-7.
- 40'ında 40 Kadın (in Turkish) (4th ed.). Turkuaz. 2013. p. 167. ISBN 978-605-559-648-4.
- 50'sinde Erkek (in Turkish) (3rd ed.). Turkuaz. 2012. p. 160. ISBN 978-605-450-548-7.
- Her Şeye Rağmen İkimiz (in Turkish) (1st ed.). Turkuaz. 2010. p. 264. ISBN 978-605-559-628-6.

== Filmography ==
- "Yapabilirsin" (2018), ("You Can Do It!")
- "Üvet Evlat" (2016), ("Step Child")
- "Persona Non Grata" (2015)
- "Yeni Hayat " (2014), ("New Life")
- "50'sinde Erkek" (2012), ("Men at 50")
- "40’ında 40 Kadın" (2010), ("40 Women at Age 40")
- "Ayaküstü Cevaplar" (video 2008), ("Answers in Standing")
