= School of Language and History – Geography =

Faculty of Language and History – Geography
- Dil ve Tarih-Coğrafya Fakültesi
- Type: Public
- Established: 1935; 91 years ago
- Founders: Mustafa Kemal Atatürk
- Dean: Prof. Dr. Levent Kayapınar
- Location: Ankara, Turkey
- Website: dtcf.ankara.edu.tr

The Faculty of Language and History – Geography (Turkish: Dil ve Tarih-Coğrafya Fakültesi, commonly abbreviated DTCF), affiliated with Ankara University in Turkey, operates independently and does not share a common campus with the rest of Ankara University. DTCF is housed in its own building located on Atatürk Boulevard in Ankara at the coordinates 39°55′47″N 32°51′20″E. The building was designed by architect Bruno Taut. Founded in 1935, the school predates the establishment of Ankara University itself. It was incorporated into the newly established Ankara University in 1946.

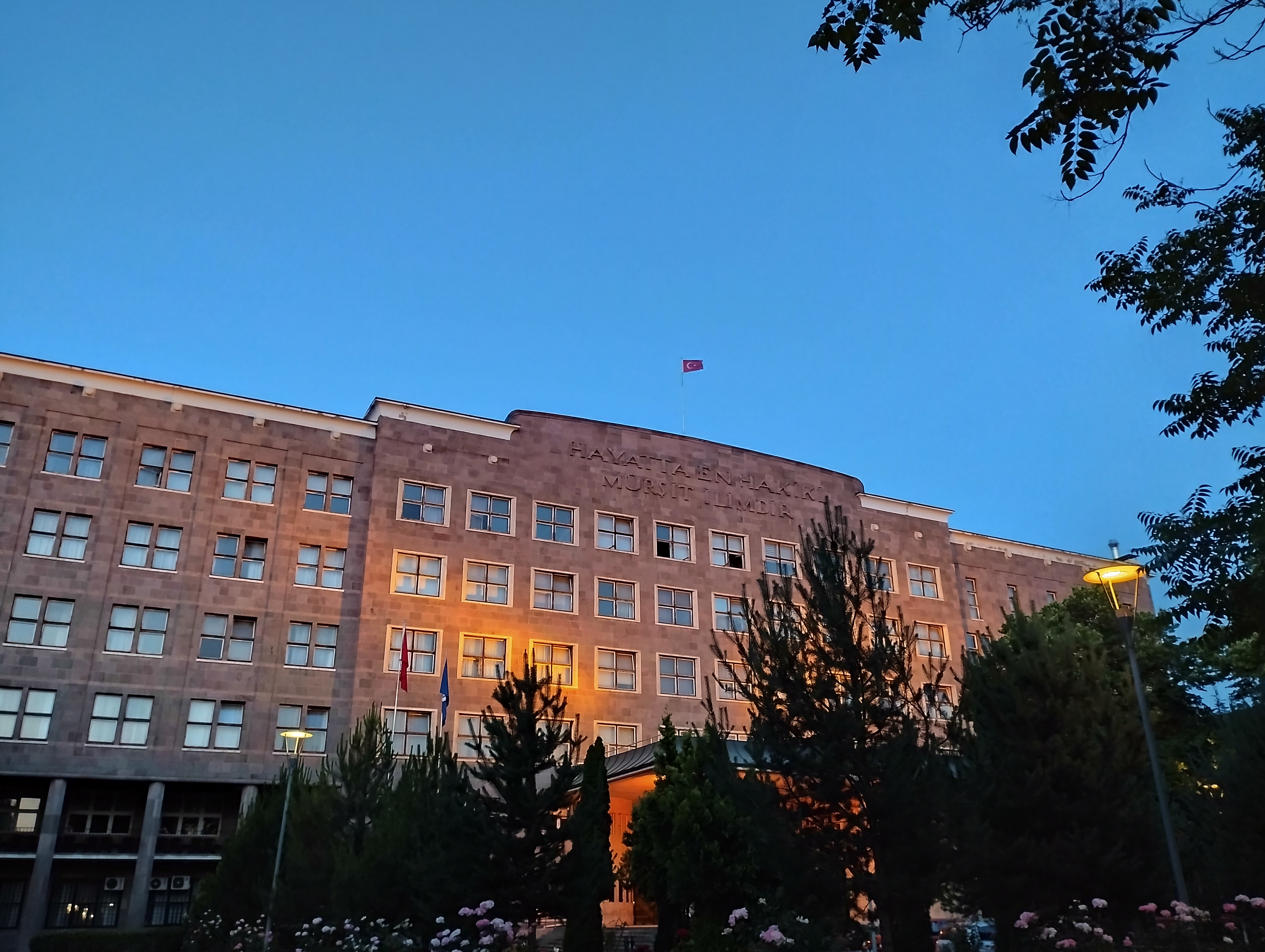
Ankara Üniversitesi Dil ve Tarih-Coğrafya Fakültesi

== Departments ==
The 19 academic units under the faculty are:

- Department of Archaeology
- Department of Anthropology
- Department of Geography
- Department of Information and Records Management
- Department of Western Languages and Literature
- Department of Modern Turkish Dialects and Literature
- Department of Linguistics
- Department of Eastern Languages and Literature
- Department of Ancient Languages and Cultures
- Department of Philosophy
- Department of Folklore
- Department of Caucasian Languages and Cultures
- Department of Psychology
- Department of Art History
- Department of Slavic Languages and Literature
- Department of Sociology
- Department of History
- Department of Theatre
- Department of Turkish Language and Literature
