= Janet Ekpenyong =

Nigerian medical professional and public official

Commissioner for Health, Cross River State
- In office 2023–2023
- Governor: Ben Ayade

Personal details
- Occupation: Public health administrator

Janet Ekpenyong is a Nigerian medical professional and politician who served as Commissioner for Health in Cross River State in 2023. She previously served as Director‑General of the Cross River State Primary Healthcare Development Agency, overseeing public health programs including vaccination campaigns and malaria prevention initiatives.

== Career ==
Ekpenyong's career has focused on public health administration. As Director-General of the Cross River State Primary Healthcare Development Agency, she oversaw vaccination campaigns, including COVID‑19 vaccinations, and malaria prevention programs distributing insecticide‑treated nets to residents.

In 2023, she was appointed Commissioner for Health by Governor Ben Ayade and confirmed by the Cross River State House of Assembly.

Following her state role, she received a national appointment as Deputy Head of Office for the National Cash Transfer Office (NCTO) under the Federal Ministry of Humanitarian Affairs and Poverty Alleviation.

== See also ==
- Executive Council of Cross River State
