= Barış Akin =

Turkish general surgeon and academic

Barış Akin is a Turkish general surgeon and academic specializing in kidney and pancreas transplantation. He served as a professor of General Surgery and the director of the kidney and pancreas transplant program at Florence Nightingale Hospital. He is an instructor for the European Society for Organ Transplantation (ESOT) and has served as the Chair of the European Kidney Transplant Association (EKITA) from 2023 to 2025.

== Education ==
Akin graduated from Ankara University Faculty of Medicine in 1995 and completed his general surgery residency in 2000. Between 2001 and 2004, he concluded a transplant surgery fellowship at Ohio State University and received certification from the American Society of Transplant Surgeons.

== Clinical career ==
Akin was awarded the “Young Researcher Award” at the American Transplant Congress in 2004. He was involved Turkey's first laparoscopic donor nephrectomy and robotic retroperitoneoscopic donor nephrectomy. Akin utilizes the Harp DN (hand-assisted retroperitoneoscopic donor nephrectomy) method and has published clinical outcomes based on a series of over 1,300 donor cases.

== Academic and International Roles ==
Akin has assisted in establishing kidney transplant programs at hospitals in Azerbaijan, Albania, Spain, Scotland and Egypt. He also implemented the PIN Kidney Paired Exchange Program to facilitate transplants for ABO-incompatible couples.
