= Ankara University Faculty of Veterinary Medicine =

- Ankara Üniversitesi Veteriner Fakültesi
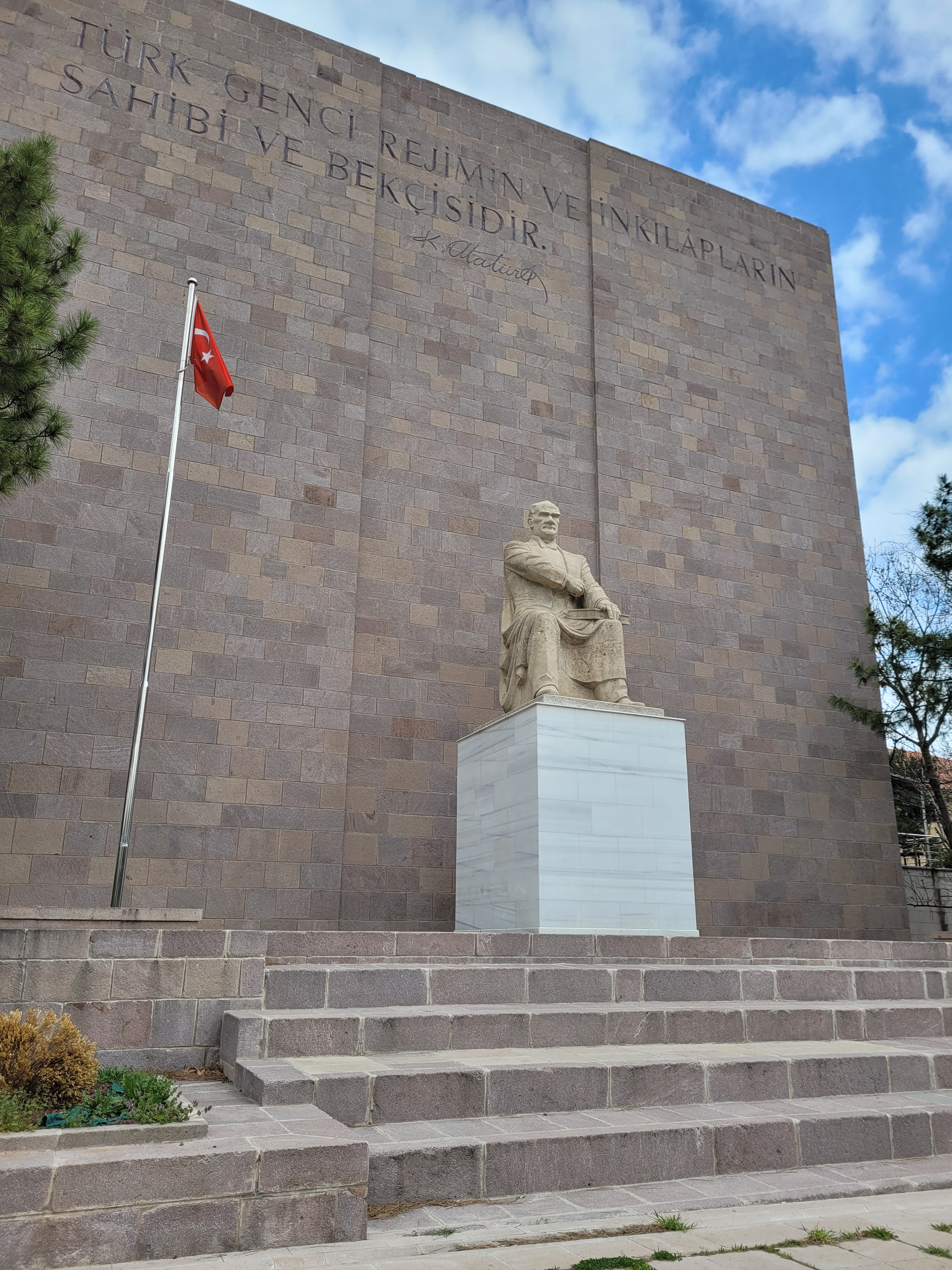
- Atatürk monument at Ankara University Faculty of Veterinary Medicine
- Type: Public
- Established: 1842; 184 years ago
- Founder: Abdülmecid I
- Parent institution: Ankara University
- Dean: Prof. Dr. Necmettin Ünal
- Location: Ankara, Turkey; 39°57′27″N 32°51′44″E
- Campus: Urban
- Language: English, Turkish
- Colors: Claret White
- Mascot: Angora goat
- Website: veterinary.ankara.edu.tr

The Ankara University Faculty of Veterinary Medicine at the Ankara University is a prominent veterinary medicine school located in Ankara. Until 1970, it was the sole faculty of veterinary medicine in Turkey to provide both education and research opportunities in the field.

== History ==
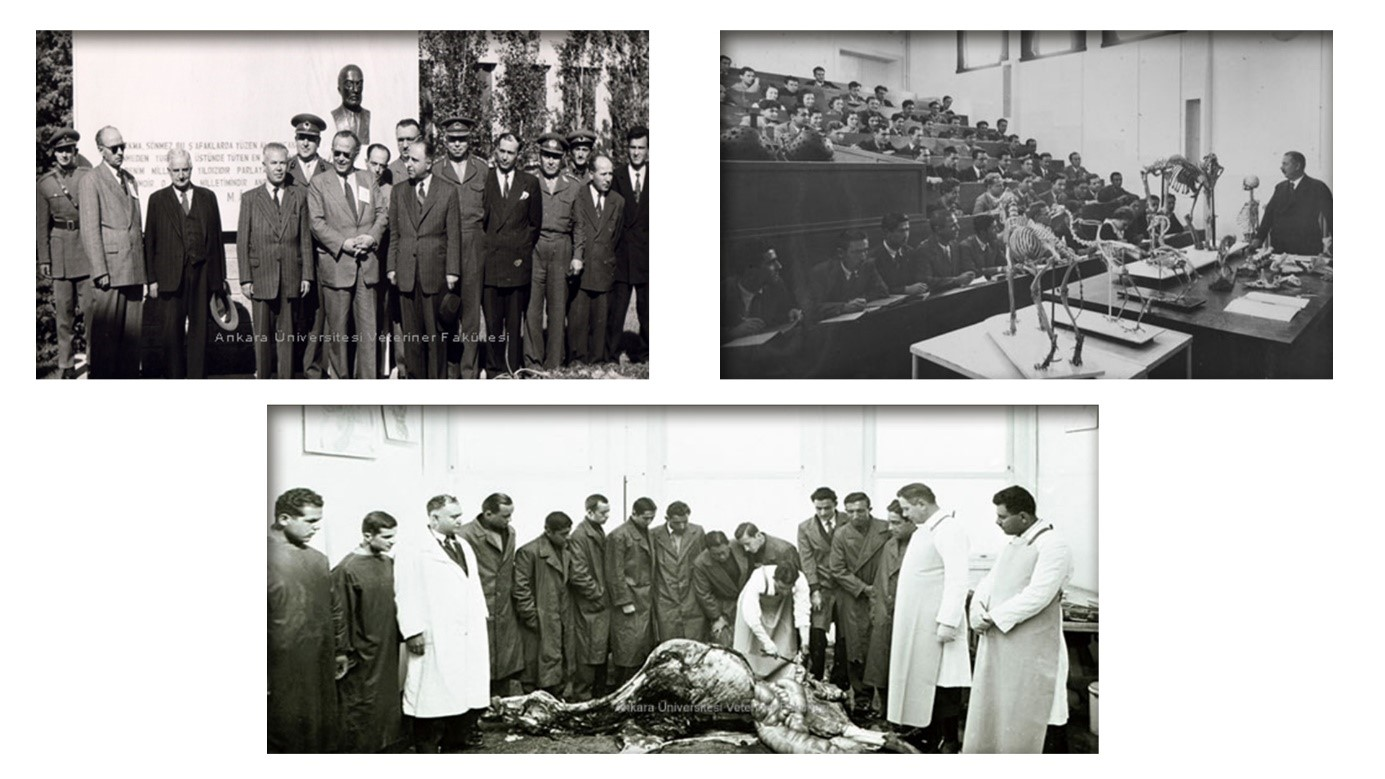
Ankara University Faculty of Veterinary Medicine, circa 1940s

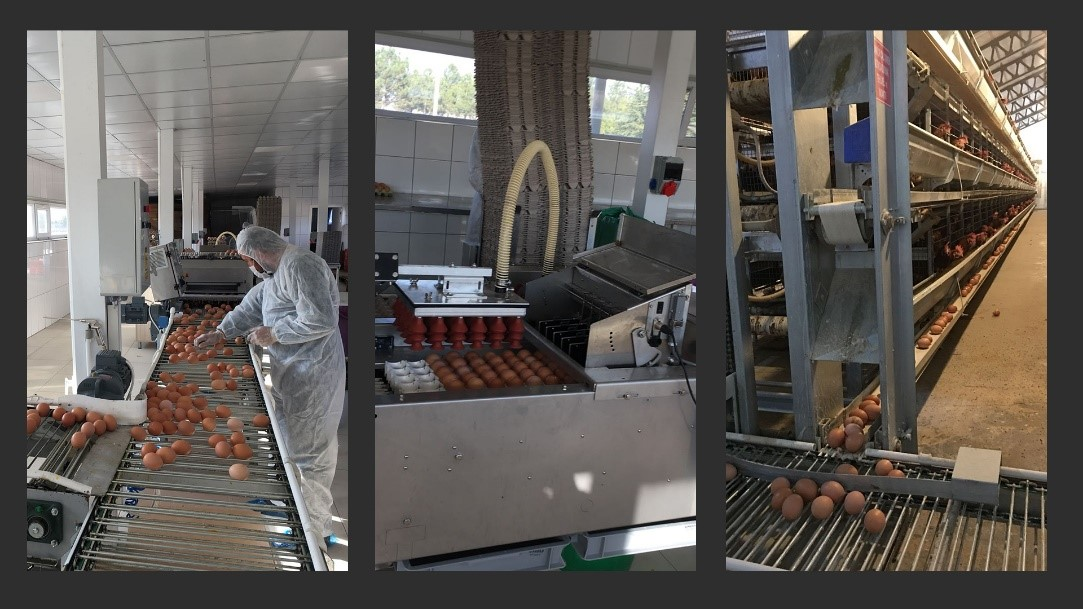
Ankara University Faculty of Veterinary Medicine Farm

The Education of Veterinary Medicine in Turkey started for the first time in 1842 at the Military Veterinary School in Istanbul. Later, the Civil Veterinary School was established in 1889 and these two organizations were united under the name of the Higher Veterinary School in 1921. Within the framework of the Higher Education reforms of the Republic of Turkey, the Veterinary School was transferred to Ankara with its entire academic and administrative staff in 1933 and was included in the Higher Agricultural Institute, and was renamed as the Faculty of Veterinary Medicine in 1939. Following the establishment of Ankara University in 1946, the Faculty of Veterinary Medicine joined Ankara University in 1948 and became one of the founding faculties of the university.

Since its establishment, as the Main Faculty, Ankara University Faculty of Veterinary Medicine has provided support to the education and research activities of most of the other Veterinary Faculties established afterward.

Faculty of Veterinary Medicine of Ankara University is a member of European Association of Establishments for Veterinary Education (EAEVE) in 2007. The Faculty was accredited by the Association for Evaluation and Accreditation of Educational Institutions and Programs of Veterinary Medicine (VEDEK) in 2015.

== Animal Hospital ==
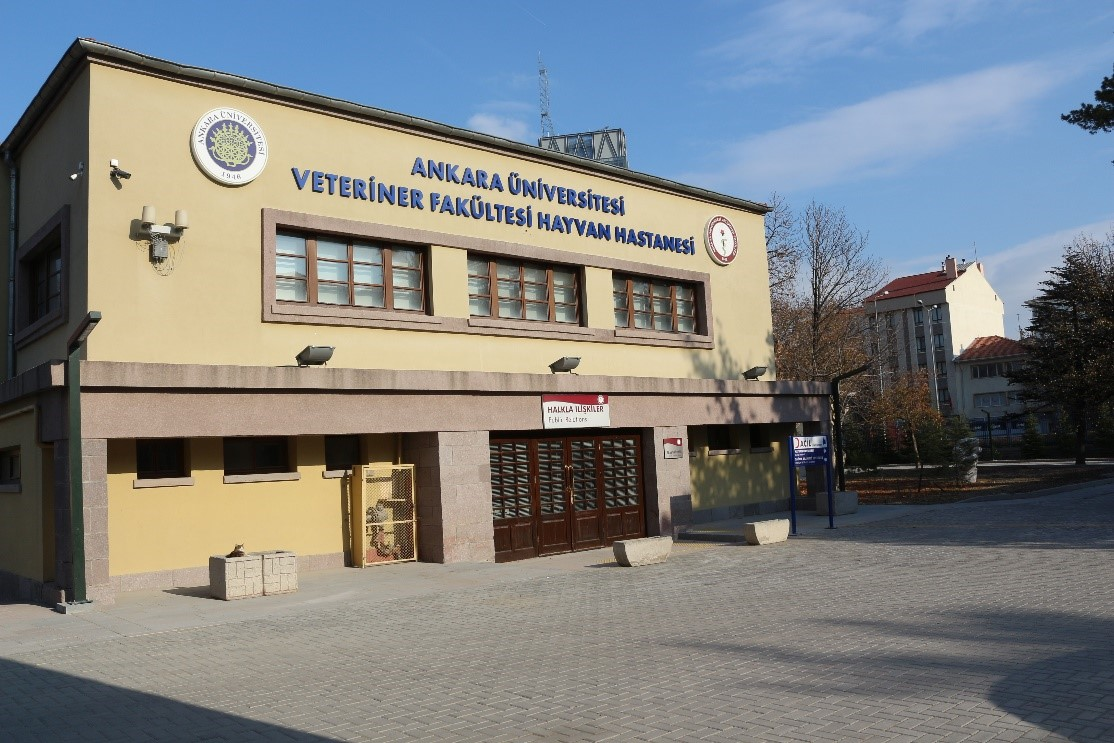
Ankara University Faculty of Veterinary Medicine Animal Hospital

The Animal Hospital building was built in 1933 as the Veterinary Faculty building of the Higher Agriculture Institute. The hospital is a cultural heritage site and after getting restored in 2015–2017, serves as one of the largest animal hospitals in Turkey. The hospital serves around 40,000 small and large animals per year. In addition to research and education, the Faculty of Veterinary Medicine at Ankara University offers community service through its Animal Hospital.

== Museum ==
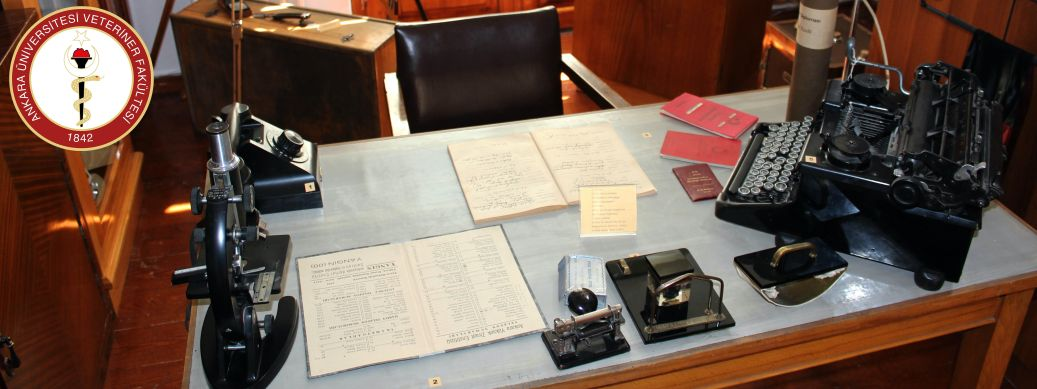
Ankara University Faculty of Veterinary Medicine Museum

The Museum of Veterinary Anatomy was established within the Faculty of Veterinary Medicine building in 2013. It displays various specimens that have been collected since 1933 for educational and presentation purposes.

== Journal ==
Veterinary Journal of Ankara University publish quarterly since 1954. It covers veterinary, animal science and zoology related topics. The journal was included in the Science Citation Index Expanded since April 2007.

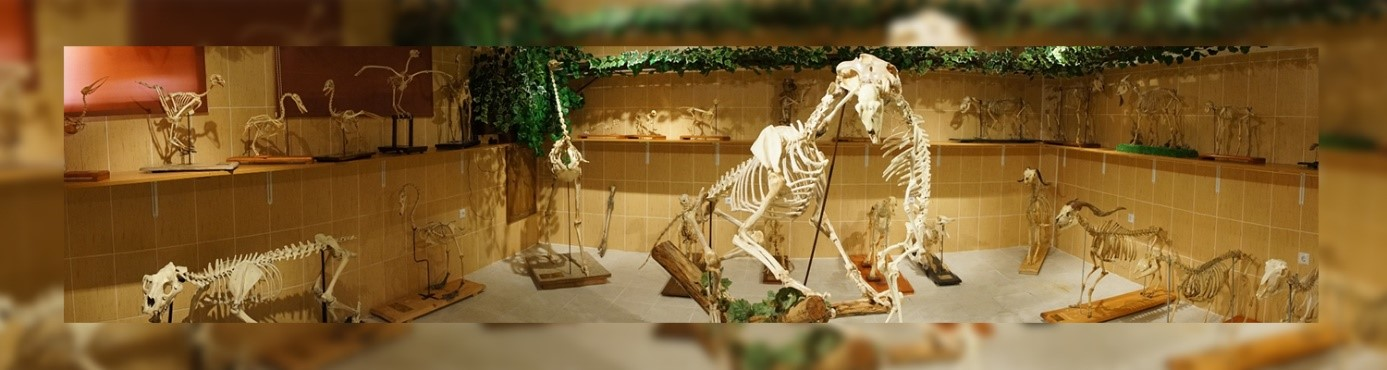
Ankara University Faculty of Veterinary Medicine Museum
