= Ita Ekpenyon =

Only known black Air Raid Precautions warden in the UK (1899–1951)

- Born: 1899; Creek Town, Calabar, Duke Town
- Died: 1951 (aged 51–52)
- Employers: Air Raid Precautions (during Second World War); Royal Mail (after the war
- Known for: Acting work
- Notable work: Sanders of the River (1935); King Solomon's Mines (1937); The Thief of Bagdad (1940)
- Children: Oku Ekpenyon

Ita Ekpenyon (1899–1951) was a Nigerian teacher and actor who was also the only known black Air Raid Precautions (ARP) warden in the United Kingdom. Ekpenyon was a teacher in Nigeria but came to London to study law. A speaker of the Efik language, he contributed to a textbook that was used by colonial authorities in Nigeria. Ekpenyon later taught the language to American actor Paul Robeson, with whom he acted in the 1930s films Sanders of the River and King Solomon's Mines. When the Second World War broke out, being too old to serve in the military, he joined the ARP service as a warden. He recounted that some London residents regarded him as lucky because of the colour of his skin, but he also encountered casual racism. Ekpenyon witnessed foreign nationals being barred from one air raid shelter and intervened to persuade the occupants to admit the newcomers; the incident was made into an animated film in 2010. Ekpenyon wrote a memoir on his ARP service and also featured in wartime broadcasts to demonstrate the commitment of West Africans to the war effort. In 2021, a Lucy Worsley docudrama featured Ekpenyon's life. After the war, Ekpenyon gave up on his ambitions for a career in law and became a postman.

== Early life ==
Ita Ekpenyon was born in Creek Town in Calabar, Nigeria, in 1899. His daughter Oku Ekpenyon stated that he was a headteacher in Nigeria before going to London in 1928. Ekpenyon lived in Great Titchfield Street, near Oxford Circus, and studied law, one of a small community of 15,000 black Africans in London at this time. He became an actor and featured, with Paul Robeson, in the 1935 London Films picture Sanders of the River and, again with Robeson, in 1937 Gaumont-British picture King Solomon's Mines. As well as appearing in the latter film, Ekpenyon coached the American Robeson in the Efik language, Ekpenyon having previously contributed to a textbook on the language that was used by British colonial officials. He also appeared in the 1940 London Films' picture The Thief of Bagdad.

== Second World War ==
Ekpenyon was too old to serve in the military during the Second World War but volunteered to join Air Raid Precautions (ARP), a government civil defence organisation. He was enrolled in D Section of the St Marylebone Borough Council Civil Defence Volunteer unit on 5 February 1940. He became a senior air raid warden, with responsibility for monitoring compliance with the blackout laws, keeping order in public air raid shelters and assisting people to safety during raids. Ekpenyon is the only known black air raid warden.

Ekpenyon later recalled that he was generally well treated, although he encountered some casual racism. He noted that some residents regarded him as a lucky mascot: "people believe that because I am a man of colour, I am a lucky omen. I had heard of such child-like beliefs, but I am delighted that such beliefs exist". On one occasion, Ekpenyon witnessed some foreign nationals being refused entry into a public shelter by its British occupants. He intervened and persuaded the occupants to admit the foreign nationals, stressing the need for "friendliness, co-operation and comradeship" to best survive the war. During the war, he wrote for and spoke on a BBC Radio series entitled Calling West Africa, which aimed to demonstrate the commitment of the Empire to the fight against fascism. One of his radio talks was published as Some Experiences of An African Air-Raid Warden. He also took part in BBC Radio's Empire series, speaking in English and Efik, and in a newsreel documenting the handing over of a tank paid for by a Nigerian chief.

== Later life and legacy ==
After the war, Ekpenyon gave up on his legal ambitions, due to a lack of funding to continue his studies. He became a postman, a job he held until his death in 1951. Ekpenyon wrote a memoir of his ARP service and became "among the most well-known of the black people who experienced the Blitz".

Footage of Ekpenyon at a 1941 Remembrance Day march was filmed by Marylebone mayor Alfred Coucher; the footage was lost but rediscovered in 2010. The footage was incorporated, together with animations made by Marylebone school children, into a 2010 film describing Ekpenyon's experience in the air raid shelter incident. The film is narrated with Ekpenyon's own account of the incident read by Nigerian actor Wale Ojo. Ekpenyon was also featured in Blitz Spirit with Lucy Worsley, a February 2021 BBC docudrama. The character of Ife, a Nigerian air raid warden, in the 2024 film Blitz is based upon Ekpenyon. Ekpenyon's daughter Oku Ekpenyon MBE is a campaigner for a memorial to victims of the slave trade to be erected in Britain.

Ekpenyon was featured in History's Secret Heroes, a BBC podcast narrated by Helena Bonham Carter.
