= Hippolytus Lukputa =

Nigerian politician

Commissioner for Water Resources, Cross River State
- In office January 2023 – May 2023
- Governor: Ben Ayade

Personal details
- Occupation: Public administrator

Hippolytus Lukputa is a Nigerian politician who served as the Commissioner for Water Resources in Cross River State. He was appointed by Governor Ben Ayade and sworn in along with twelve other commissioners in a minor cabinet reshuffle in January 2023.

== See also ==
- Executive Council of Cross River State
