= Ankara University, Turkish and Foreign Language Application and Research Center =

Language teaching institution in Turkey

Turkish and Foreign Languages Research and Application Center of Ankara University, TÖMER, was founded in 1984 by Mehmet Hengirmen for the purposes of teaching the Turkish language to foreigners and natives; such language and culture institutions as the British Council, Goethe Institut, Instituto Cervantes and Alliance française acted as models for the constitution of the Center. It has class levels from beginner to advanced.

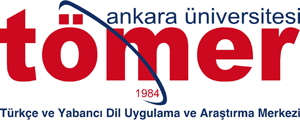
TÖMER logo

== History and development ==
Initially, TÖMER served within the main building of the Faculty of Letters of Ankara University. In later years, classes and administrative units were established in the Social Sciences Institute and the Morphology Department of the same university. In addition to Turkish, TÖMER started organizing English language courses in 1986, to be followed by German language courses in 1987. In 1989, French was added to the list of languages taught at TÖMER. Ankara University opened TÖMER branches in the Republic of Northern Cyprus, as well as in Berlin and Frankfurt; however, these branches were short-lived. Istanbul and Izmir branches, among the first opened in Turkey, on the other hand, still serve language learners. When several Central Asian Turkic republics gained independence and a large number of students from these newly independent countries arrived in Turkey to receive university education, TÖMER Tunalı Hilmi Branch in Ankara was established; other TÖMER branches in these years included those in such cities as Edirne, Trabzon, Samsun, Konya, Kayseri, Eskişehir and Antalya. In the same years, several Turkish teachers were sent to these Central Asian Turkic republics to teach Turkish in universities. In time, some of these TÖMER branches – such as those in Eskişehir, Konya and Edirne – were closed down while some new additions – Alanya, Ankara ORAN, Denizli, and the like – were set up. As of February 2014, there are 11 branches and a central office in TÖMER. Central office and two branches are in Ankara, two more branches are situated in Istanbul. There are also branches in Trabzon, Giresun, Samsun, Marmaris, Izmir, Bursa, Antalya and Alanya.

== Management ==
Dr. Mehmet Hengirmen, serving as the President of TÖMER since its foundation, was replaced in 2002 by Ms. Aypar Altınel, herself serving as a Turkish teacher within TÖMER. When Ms. Altınel retired, she was replaced by the current president, Assistant Professor Dr. Nadir Engin Uzun, who is also a member of the Linguistics Department of the Faculty of Letters of Ankara University. After Ass. Prof. Dr. Nadir Engin Uzun the position of the head of TÖMER was taken up by Ass.Prof.Dr. M. Ertan GÖKMEN.

== Language courses ==
TÖMER is an institution of Ankara University, run on revolving fund basis. Language courses are organized throughout the year, with weekday and weekend classes. TÖMER has about 55 thousand learners receive language education in one academic year. Languages taught in TÖMER include Turkish, English, German, French, Spanish, Italian, Russian, Japanese, Modern Greek, Dutch, Korean, Bulgarian, Chinese, Ottoman language, Arabic, Polish and languages of the Central Asian Turkic Republics.

== Publications ==
TÖMER Publications include

- Edebiyat (Istanbul TÖMER)
- Dil ve İnsan (Kayseri TÖMER)
- Alleben (Gaziantep TÖMER)
- TÖMER Çeviri (Bursa TÖMER)
- Mavi Portakal (Antalya TÖMER)
- Türk Lehçeleri (Tunalı Hilmi TÖMER)
- Dil Dergisi (Ankara TÖMER)
- Ana Dili (İzmir TÖMER)
- Cukurova TÖMER

Of these, Dil Dergisi ile Ana Dili are currently published. In addition, Hitit, a series of textbooks for the teaching of Turkish as a foreign language, has been written and published by TÖMER, and is currently used in language courses both in TÖMER and in several other institutions.

== Projects ==
TÖMER participates in several European Union projects; these include

- LANCELOT
- European Languages Web 2
- NEWAP
- LINGUA Projects
- FIRST STEPS
- EUROPODIANS

Official website
