= Middle East Society for Organ Transplantation =

- Abbreviation: MESOT
- Founder: Mehmet A. Haberal
- Founded at: Turkey
- Products: Experimental and Clinical Transplantation
- Members: All Arab countries, Iran, Turkey, Pakistan and countries of Central Asia
- President: Mohammad Ghnaimat (2023-2025)
- President Elect: Ali Abdul Kareem Al Obaidli
- Vice President: Ala Sh. Ali
- Immediate Past President: Antoine Barbari
- Website: mesot-tx.org

The Middle East Society for Organ Transplantation (MESOT) is an organization that promotes developments in the field of organ transplantation between medical centers in Middle Eastern, North African and some neighbouring Asian countries. It was founded in Turkey by Mehmet A. Haberal in 1987 and there are more than 29 countries that have membership covering a population of more than 600 million.

With the aim of preventing transplant tourism and promoting ethical standards in organ transplantation, MESOT organizes meetings and annual conferences on the improvement of transplantation practices in the Asian region.

Its official journal is the Experimental and Clinical Transplantation.

== Past presidents ==
=== 2010-2020 ===
| Years | Name | Comments |
|---|---|---|
| 2010-2012 | Marwan Masri | |
| 2012-2014 | S. Ali Malek-Hosseini | |
| 2014-2016 | Mehmet Haberal | |
| 2016-2018 | Bassam Saeed | |
| 2018-2020 | Refaat R. Kamel | |
| 2020-2023 | Antoine Barbari | |
| 2023- 2025 | Mohammad Ghnaimat | |
