= Oku Ekpenyon =

British campaigner

Oku Ekpenyon MBE
- Born: Oku Anwan Ekpenyon; London, England
- Occupations: History teacher and campaigner
- Known for: Founder of Memorial 2007
- Parent: Ita Ekpenyon (father)
- Website: www.memorial2007.org.uk

Oku Ekpenyon MBE is a British campaigner and former history teacher who is founder and chair of the charity Memorial 2007 (MEM2007), advocating over two decades for the establishment of Britain's first permanent national memorial to honour the millions of enslaved Africans and their descendants. In the 2010 Birthday Honours, she was appointed a Member of the Order of the British Empire (MBE) for "voluntary service to the History of Black British People".

== Background ==
Oku Anwan Ekpenyon was born in London, the daughter of Ita Ekpenyon (1899–1951), a Nigerian teacher who in 1928 had gone there and studied law, later becoming the only known black Air Raid Precautions (ARP) warden in the United Kingdom. She authored the booklet on him, Some Experiences of an African Air-raid Warden, published by Westminster City Archives.

Oku Ekpenyon was head of history at an inner-London school when, in the late 1990s, she took some students on a tour of the Tower of London, after which a pupil of African heritage asked: "Where is our history?" This led Ekpenyon with a group of friends to launch a charity, Memorial 2007, linked to the bicentenary of the Slave Trade Act 1807 that abolished the trade in the British empire, and also being an educational resource. As historian Caroline Bressey has noted: "Memorial 2007 launched a campaign to memorialise not the white parliamentary abolitionists, but the Africans who were victims of and fought against the institutions of British slavery." The original intention had been for a sculpture, chosen by public competition, to be unveiled during the bicentenary year in 2007.

Patrons of Memorial 2007 include Paul Boateng, Ray Fearon, Philippa Gregory, Doreen Lawrence, Jack Lohman, Sandy Nairne, Dave Prentis and Mark Palmer-Edgecumbe.

=== Memorial 2007 ===
The Memorial 2007 educational charity aims to erect a sculpture in memory of those who had been enslaved and their descendants, with the chosen location being in the south-east corner of London's Hyde Park. In 2008, the project was backed by Boris Johnson, at that time Mayor of London, who hosted the unveiling of the design at City Hall, stating: "It is important that this era in our history is never forgotten. Hyde Park is a fitting site for a permanent memorial to the millions who lost their lives and the courageous people who fought to end the brutal transatlantic slave trade."

In an article published in The Observer in October 2015, titled "Why has a memorial to slaves quietly been dropped?", historian David Olusoga concluded: "Given the scale of Britain’s involvement and the enormous profits generated from the trade, the creation of a single memorial to the victims of that system in a London rose garden seems a fairly modest demand."

In 2019, a petition was started calling on the Ministry of Housing, Communities and Local Government to fund the memorial before planning permission expired on 7 November that year. However, government funding was denied, and the charity continues trying to raise money through small donations, with Ekpenyon reported by the BBC as saying: "The government has supported over the years various memorials financially; why not support us?" She notes the need for somewhere in London, England's capital, where people can go to educate themselves about the slave trade and its history and, in 2020, said that the Black Lives Matter protests gave an opportunity to reignite the campaign; a fundraiser was set up in the absence of official help, although a government statement said: "We are supportive of the aims of the monument and the organisation. The suffering caused by slavery and the slave trade are among the most dishonourable and abhorrent chapters in human history."

Ekpenyon states: "It is the government that decides what to support financially. Boris Johnson said tearing down of statues is lying about our history. Refusing to erect a memorial to enslaved Africans is lying about our history, 400 years of history."

Ekpenyon is a Senior Research Fellow at the Institute of Commonwealth Studies, School of Advanced Study at the University of London.

== See also ==
- International Slavery Museum
