= Dimitri Ashkenazy =

Icelandic clarinetist

Dimitri Thor Ashkenazy (born October 8, 1969, in New York City) is an Icelandic clarinetist living in Switzerland. He is the son of pianist and conductor Vladimir Ashkenazy and has toured Europe with him, as well as performing under him with the Sydney Symphony Orchestra.

== Biography ==
Dimitri Ashkenazy was born into a musically successful family: he is the son of pianist and conductor Vladimir Ashkenazy and Þórunn Jóhannsdóttir, and his brother Vovka is also a professional pianist. In 1978 he moved with his parents from his native Iceland to Switzerland, where he has lived ever since. At the age of 9, he was involved in a waterskiing accident in Greece when one of his legs was slashed by the propeller of a speedboat, severing the sciatic nerve. He was brought to Sydney to Professor Earl Owen, a pioneer in microsurgery, to have the leg rebuilt.

Ashkenazy received music lessons on the piano from the age of six, and at the age of 10 he switched to the clarinet. He won numerous prizes at the Swiss Youth Music Competitions of 1986–88 in solo and chamber music, and in 1989 he entered the Conservatory of Lucerne, obtaining a teaching diploma with distinction in 1993 after studying under Giambattista Sisini. He was a founding member of the European Soloists Ensemble in 1992. A 1994 review in Stereo Review said of his interpretation of Richard Strauss, "The performers ... give an excellent account of themselves and of the delectable music."

Since 1991, he has given concerts all over the world, including at the Hollywood Bowl in Los Angeles, the Sydney Opera House, in London's Royal Festival Hall, the Salzburg Festival, the Rudolfinum in Prague and at the Salle Pleyel in Paris. He has worked with prestigious orchestras such as the Deutsches Symphonie-Orchester Berlin, the Royal Philharmonic Orchestra, the Japan Philharmonic Orchestra, the Czech Philharmonic Orchestra, and the St. Petersburg Philharmonic and with renowned artists such as Peter Maxwell Davies, Krzysztof Penderecki, Edita Gruberová, Nikolai Morozov, Barbara Bonney and Bernd Glemser. He has toured Europe with his father, and has performed under him with the Sydney Symphony Orchestra.

Ashkenazy has premiered five clarinet concertos: Caspar Diethelm's „Concerto Hiemalis“, Concerto per Clarinetto e Orchestra Piano Americano of Italian composer Marco Tutino at Teatro alla Scala, Passages for clarinet and orchestra by Filippo del Corno, Richard Festinger's Equinox and George Palmer's concerto It Takes Two, for two clarinets and chamber orchestra.
