= Portrait of Elizabeth II (Ward) =

2016 painting by Henry Ward

Her Majesty Queen Elizabeth II with the Founder of the British Red Cross Henri Dunant
- Artist: Henry Ward
- Year: 2016
- Medium: Oil on canvas
- Dimensions: 250 cm (100 in × 80 in)
- Location: Savoy Hotel, London

Queen Elizabeth II is a 2016 painting of the British monarch by British-Canadian artist Henry Ward. Its full title is Her Majesty Queen Elizabeth II with the Founder of the British Red Cross Henri Dunant. Painted in secret in Canada, it was unveiled by the Queen at Windsor Castle that October and commemorated the Queen's 60-year role as the patron of the British Red Cross.

== Background ==
Ward was chosen to prepare the portrait as he was a long-standing supporter of the British Red Cross. The painting was influenced by the work of previous royal portraitists including Anthony van Dyck and Joshua Reynolds. Ward painted the portrait in secret in his converted garage studio in Burlington, Ontario, using reference photographs from a two-hour session at Windsor Castle's White Drawing Room. He later remarked that passers-by would occasionally catch a glance at the work in progress and be surprised.

== Features ==
In the portrait, Ward attempted to show the links between the charity and royalty through the blue Order of the Garter robes, the diamond bracelet and tiara, which were owned by the British Red Cross's first royal patron, Queen Alexandra (consort of Edward VII), and in the background a bust of Henry Dunant, founder of the International Committee of the Red Cross.

Ward wanted to show an authentic portrayal of the Queen in her 90s. He later said, "I wanted a strong queen in my portrait, a queen of warmth but also of reserve."

== Unveiling ==
The painting was unveiled at Windsor Castle on 14 October 2016, by the Queen. The following month the first public viewing was planned at the Jumeirah Carlton Tower hotel, Knightsbridge. It was then put on permanent display at the Savoy Hotel.

== See also ==
- Her Majesty Queen Elizabeth II – An 80th Birthday Portrait
- Pietro Annigoni's portraits of Elizabeth II
