= Başkent University Medical and Research Center of Alanya =

Hospital in Alanya, Turkey

Coordinates: 36.54719°N 31.99415°E

Geography
- Location: Turkey

Links
- Lists: Hospitals in Turkey

Başkent University Medical and Research Center of Alanya is a medical and research center in Alanya, Turkey. It is one of the Başkent University hospitals in Turkey. The center was opened on 10 July 2000. The center has a certificate of ISO-EN 9001:2000 Quality system. There are nearly 100 beds in the Block A and policlinics in the Block B. There's also a dialysis center within. It has nearly 650 personnel.
