= Mehmet Haberal =

Turkish politician

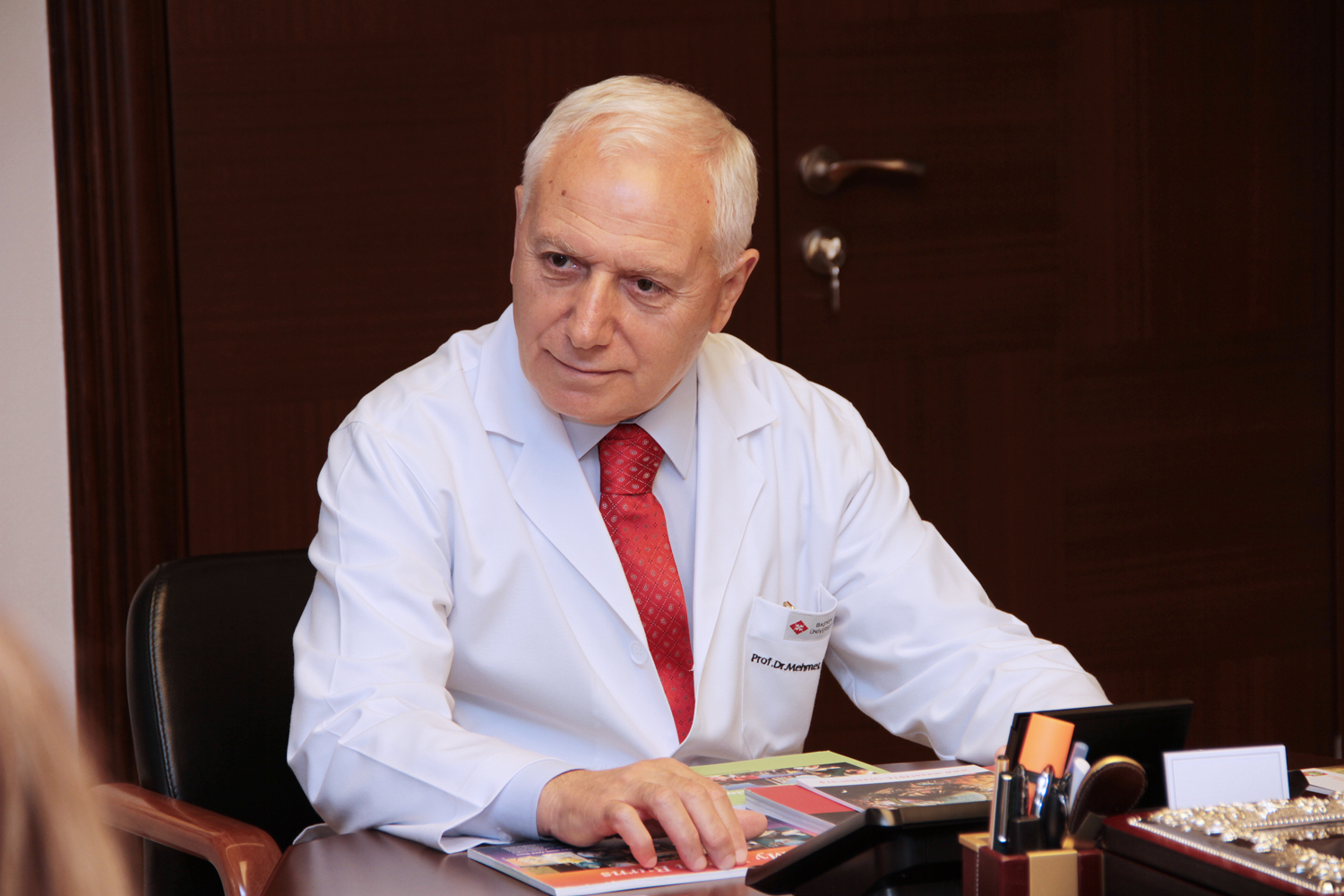
- Born: 1944 (age 81–82); Pazar, Rize Province, Turkey
- Known for: First transplant surgeon in Turkey; Turkey's first living-related kidney transplant in 1975; Founder of Başkent University; Founder of Middle East Society for Organ Transplantation (MESOT)
- Awards: Everett Idris Evans Memorial Award from the American Burn Association (1985); Distinguished Philanthropist Award by the American College of Surgeons (2017)
- Scientific career
- Fields: Organ transplantation
- Workplaces: Medical School of Hacettepe University; Başkent University

Mehmet Haberal (born 1944), is the founder of Başkent University in Ankara, Turkey, best known for becoming the first transplant surgeon in Turkey after leading the team that performed Turkey's first living-related kidney transplant in 1975, after he returned from surgical training under the mentorship of American surgeon Thomas Starzl, with whom he also performed some of the longest surviving early liver transplantations.

Just over a year after returning from the States, he established a network of centres for dialysis for people with end-stage kidney failure and then, in 1978, led the team that performed Turkey's first kidney transplantation using a kidney from a deceased person. After successfully lobbying for changed laws in Turkey, his team performed the first local deceased-donor kidney transplantation at Hacettepe University in 1979. His role in the passing of further legislation led to Turkey's first deceased donor liver transplantation in 1988 and the first living donor liver transplantation in 1990.

== Early life and education ==
Mehmet Haberal was born in 1944, in Pazar, Rize, Turkey. As a child, he initially aspired to becoming an engineer until his second year at high school, when he changed his mind to medicine. In 1967, he graduated from Ankara University Medical School, and in June of that year, became resident at the Department of General Surgery at the Medical School of Hacettepe University.

== Surgical career ==
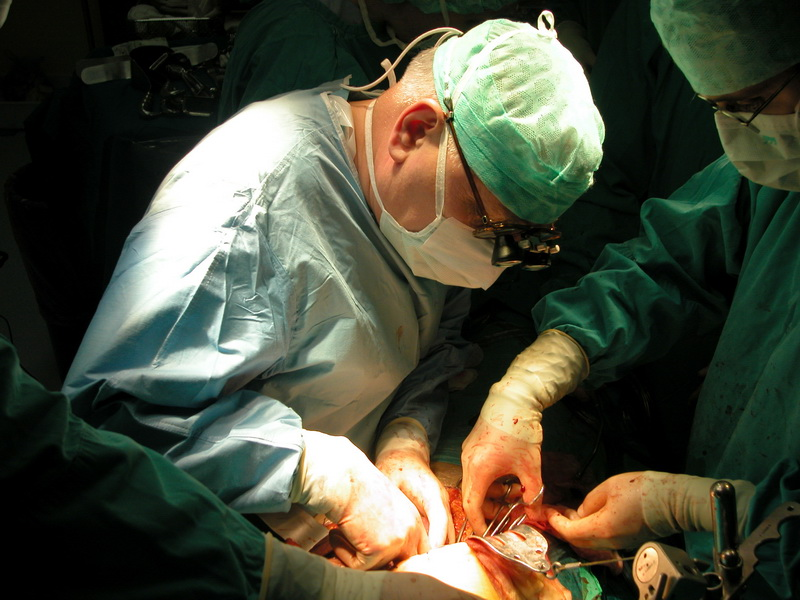
Haberal performing surgery

During his residency, he became interested in general surgery and the management of burns and subsequently co-authored the paper "Results obtained from the application of 0.5 per cent silver nitrate solution in the treatment of burns", published in the Journal of Turkish Medical Society in 1970. During this time, he also started experimental liver transplantations.

After completing his residency in 1971, he was appointed Assistant Professor at Hacettepe's Department of General Surgery, where he also became Associate Professor in 1976 and full professor in 1982.

He completed his fellowship in burns at the Shriners Burn Institute and John Sealy Hospital in Galveston, Texas (1973) before training under Thomas Starzl at the Colorado University Medical School Transplantation Center, Denver (January 1974 – June 1975). Four of the liver transplantations he performed with Starzl, went on to survive more than 40 years with their transplanted livers. After Starzl's death in 2017, Haberal described him as "my guide and my inspiration".

=== Kidney and liver transplantations ===
In June 1975, when he returned from the States, he met with founder and president of Hacettepe University, İhsan Doğramacı, and a transplantation unit was set up. Haberal became the first transplant surgeon in Turkey.

On 3 November 1975, he led the team that performed the first renal transplantation in Turkey, where a living mother donated a kidney to her 12-year old son. Just over a year after returning from the States, he established a network of centres for dialysis for people with end-stage kidney failure and then on 10 October 1978, he led the team that performed Turkey's first kidney transplantation using a kidney from a deceased person, donated by the European Transplant Foundation (ETF).

On 27 July 1979, his team performed the first local deceased-donor kidney transplantation at Hacettepe University. The donor kidney came from a person who was killed in a road traffic accident. Until this time, kidneys came via the ETF and often had extended cold ischaemia times. Haberal had, in the interim, and before the 1980 Turkish coup d'état, lobbied and worked with Turkish government officials and religious boards, until a law, legislation no. 2238, passed on the “harvesting, storing, grafting, and transplanting of organs and tissues”. It legalised the diagnosis of brain death and meant that kidneys could be acquired from a local supply as an alternative to importing from Europe. However, the lack of donors, meant that Europe was still relied upon. He was subsequently a key navigator in the passing of the 1982 legislation no. 2594, which led to the first deceased donor liver transplantation in 1988 and the first living donor liver transplantation in 1990. From 1975, over the next 18 years, he co-ordinated 931 transplants across Turkey and developed an organ-sharing database from Ankara.

By 2015 there were 45 liver transplantation centers in Turkey.

=== Establishments ===
He founded the Middle East Society for Organ Transplantation (MESOT) in 1987, along with its official journal Experimental and Clinical Transplantation, the Turkish Transplantation Society in 1991, Başkent University in Ankara in 1993 of which he became president, and the World Academy of Medical, Biomedical and Ethical Sciences in 2012.

He established the International Haberal Transplantation and Education Foundation (IHTEF) (2013) to support the work of the 2008 Declaration of Istanbul (DoI) on Organ Trafficking and Transplant Tourism, of which he is a member of the Steering Committee.

He is the only Turkish citizen to be elected as an Honorary Foreign Member of the American Surgical Association and the Institute of Medicine of the United States National Academy of Science.

=== Political activities ===
On 13 April 2009, Haberal was detained by the police, along with others suspected of involvement in an anti-government group known as Ergenekon. In 2011, he was elected Member of the Turkish Grand National Assembly, representing Zonguldak as a member of the Republican People's Party (Turkish: Cumhuriyet Halk Partisi, abbreviated CHP). However, at the time of his election he was in prison awaiting trial. On 5 August 2013, he was cleared and released from a 12.5 years' imprisonment sentence in the Ergenekon case. He had already served time from 2009. On 1 October 2013, he assumed his parliamentary seat. He served in parliament until the following election in 2015, at which time he chose not to be a candidate.

== Awards and honours ==
- 1985: Everett Idris Evans Memorial Award from the American Burn Association.
- 2017: Distinguished Philanthropist Award by the American College of Surgeons.

== Selected publications ==
Haberal has authored close to 2,000 Turkish and English scientific publications, including six books.

=== Articles ===
- Putnam, Charles W.; Halgrimson, Charles G.; Stables, Derek P.; Pfister, Ronald; Beart, Robert W.; Kootstra, Gauke; Haberal, Mehmet; Atkins, Dale; Starzl, Thomas E. (1975). "Ex vivo renal perfusion and autotransplantation in treatment of calculous disease or abdominal aortic aneurysm". Urology. 5: 337–342. doi:10.1016/0090-4295(75)90149-1. PMC 2958687.

==== Burns ====
- Topuzlu, C; Haberal, M; Gülgönen, A (1970). "[Results obtained from the application of 0.5 per cent silver nitrate solution in the treatment of burns]". Turk Tip Cemiy Mecm. 36: 302–9. PMID 5514252.
- Haberal, M (1986). "Electrical burns: a five-year experience--1985 Evans lecture". J Trauma. 26: 103–9. doi:10.1097/00005373-198602000-00001. PMID 3080600.
- Haberal, M.; Uçar, U.; Bilgin, N. (1995). "Epidemiological survey of burns treated in Ankara, Turkey and desirable burn-prevention strategies". Burns. 21: 601–606. doi:10.1016/0305-4179(95)00044-C.

==== Transplantation ====
- "Living unrelated donor kidney transplantation between spouses". World Journal of Surgery. Vol. 16, issue 6 (November 1992), pp. 1183–1187. Co-authored with Huseyin Gulayy, Rifat Tokyay, Zafer Oner, Tayfun Enunlu and Nevzat Bilgin.
