= Ankara University Medical School =

Coordinates: 39.93502°N 32.88424°E

Ankara University Medical School is a medical school affiliated with Ankara University and located in the Sıhhiye of Ankara, Turkey, was established in 1945 as the second medical school in the country. The opening of this institution was prompted by the inability of Istanbul University Medical School to meet the growing demand for trained medical professionals. According to the QS World University Rankings, Ankara Medical School is ranked as the third-best medical school in Turkey.

== Campus ==
Ankara Medical School comprises three campuses. The Morphology Campus, established in 1967, houses the Dean's office, Vice Deans' offices, the Faculty Secretary, the central library, 13 departments, 4 disciplines, and various administrative offices. The İbni Sina Campus functions as a large hospital featuring internal and surgical medical departments, various medical care units, and clinical and molecular laboratories. Additionally, the school includes the Cebeci Campus.
