= Executive Council of Cross River State =

The Cross River State Executive Council (also known as the Cabinet of Cross River State) is the highest governmental body that plays important roles in the Government of Cross River State, Nigeria, headed by the Governor of Cross River State. The Council consists of the Governor, Deputy Governor, Secretary to the State Government, and Commissioners who are Chief Executive Officers of Ministries in the State.

== Functions ==
The Executive Council exists to advise and direct the Governor. Their appointment as members of the Executive Council gives them the authority to execute power over their fields.

The current Executive Council is serving under the Bassey Edet Otu administration.

Office	Incumbent
Governor	Prince Bassey Edet Otu
Deputy Governor	Rt. Hon. Peter Odey
Secretary to the State Government	Prof. Anthony Owan-Enoh
Attorney General & Commissioner for Justice	Ededem Ani
Commissioner for Crops and Irrigation Development	Johnson Ebekpo Jnr
Commissioner for Education	Sen. Dr. Stephen Odey
Commissioner for health	Dr. Egbe Ayuk
Commissioner for Commerce	Abigail Duke
Commissioner for Environment	Moses Osogi
Commissioner for Finance	Mike Odere
Commissioner for Tourism, Arts and Culture	Robert Ewa
Commissioner for Information and Orientation	Erasmus Ekpang
Commissioner for Grants & Economic Development	Ulafor John Onor
Commissioner for Lands	Francis Ekpenyong
Commissioner for Local Government Affairs	Felix Idem
Commissioner for Power and Renewable Energy	Eka Williams
Commissioner for Housing	Beatrice Igwe
Commissioner for Solid Minerals	Effiom Ekaha
Commissioner for International Donor Coordination	Hon. Hippolytus Lukpata
Commissioner for Transportation	Ekpeyong Cobham
Commissioner for Water Resources	Barr. Bassey Mensah
Commissioner for Women Affairs	Hon. Edema Erom
Commissioner for Works and infrastructure	Ankpo Pius Edet
Commissioner for Youths Development	Barr. Odum Ijom Ukam
Commissioner For Rural Transformation	Edem Okonkon
Commissioner For Sports	Hon.Agnes Atsu
Commissioner For Training & Doctoring	Anthony Eneji
Commissioner For Robotics & AI	Mike Eyare
Commissioner for Establishments, Training & Pensions	Lawrencia Ita
Commissioner For Humanity & Social welfare	Blessing Egbara
Commissioner For Aviation	Capt. Imah Eno Utum
Commissioner for Special Duties	Francis Etta
Commissioner For Industry	Dr Matthias Angiaha
