= Declaration of Istanbul =

2008 declaration on organ transplant tourism

The Declaration of Istanbul is a document regarding human organ transplantation as a business. It was created at the Istanbul Summit on Organ Trafficking and Transplant Tourism held from 30 April to 1 May 2008 in Istanbul, Turkey. The Declaration clarifies the issues of transplant tourism, trafficking and commercialism, and provides ethical guidelines for practice in organ donation and transplantation. Since the creation of the declaration, over 100 countries have endorsed the principles. Some nations have subsequently strengthened their laws against commercial organ trade, including China, Israel, the Philippines, and Pakistan.

== History ==
As a consequence of the widespread shortage of organs and the increasing ease of Internet communication, organ trafficking and transplant tourism have become global problems accounting for an estimated 10% of organ transplants that are performed annually around the world. Organ trafficking, transplant tourism and transplant commercialism threaten to undermine the ethics and legacy of transplantation worldwide because of the reality associated with these practices - the vulnerable in resource poor countries (such as the illiterate and impoverished, undocumented immigrants, prisoners, and political or economic refugees) are exploited as a source of organs for rich patient-tourists who are prepared to travel and can afford to purchase organs.

== The Istanbul Summit ==
These unethical practices were the subject of a Summit convened in Istanbul from 30 April to 1 May 2008 by The Transplantation Society (TTS) and the International Society of Nephrology (ISN). The result of these deliberations was the Istanbul Declaration on Organ Trafficking and Transplant Tourism. The development of the Istanbul Summit and Declaration was derived from a direction by the World Health Assembly in 2004 as it adopted resolution WHA57.18 urging member states 'to take measures to protect the poorest and vulnerable groups from transplant tourism and the sale of tissues and organs, including attention to the wider problem of international trafficking in human tissues and organs'.

== Content of the Declaration of Istanbul ==
The Declaration emphasizes that organ trafficking and transplant tourism should be prohibited because they violate the principles of equity, justice and respect for human dignity. The Declaration asserts that because transplant commercialism targets impoverished and otherwise vulnerable donors, it leads inexorably to inequity and injustice and should also be prohibited.

Although the World Health Assembly 2004 resolution was unambiguous in its objection to trafficking and transplant tourism, a comprehensive description of these unethical practices was still needed. Organ trafficking, transplant tourism and transplant commercialism are now defined by the Declaration, and it provides principles of practice based on those definitions. The Istanbul Declaration distinguishes transplant tourism from travel for transplantation. Travel for transplantation is the movement of organs, donors, recipients or transplant professionals across jurisdictional borders for transplantation purposes. Travel for transplantation becomes transplant tourism if (1) it involves organ trafficking and/or transplant commercialism or; (2) if the resources (organs, professionals and transplant centers) devoted to providing transplants to patients from outside a country undermine the country's ability to provide transplant services for its own population.

Not all recipients' travel to a foreign country to undergo transplantation is unethical. Travel for transplantation may be ethical if the following conditions are fulfilled:

For live donor transplantation:

(1) if the recipient has a dual citizenship and wishes to undergo transplantation from a live donor that is a family member in a country of citizenship that is not their residence;

(2) if the donor and recipient are genetically related and wish to undergo transplantation in a country not of their residence.

For deceased donor transplantation:

(1) if official regulated bilateral or multilateral organ sharing programs exist between or among jurisdictions that are based on reciprocated organ-sharing programs among the jurisdictions.

== Updated edition ==
In 2010 the Declaration of Istanbul Custodian Group (DICG) was created; in 2018 the DICG carried out a consultation to update the Declaration. The 2018 edition revised key definitions and gave 11 principles of ethical transplantation.

== See also ==
- Organ harvesting from Falun Gong practitioners in China
