= Başkent University =

Private university in Ankara, Turkey

Coordinates: 39°53′15″N 32°39′14″E

- Başkent Üniversitesi
- Motto: Başkent University Accumulates Scientific Knowledge and Disseminates It to The Universe
- Type: Private (foundation university)
- Established: January 13, 1994
- Founders: Prof. Dr. Mehmet Haberal
- Provost: -
- Rector: Prof. Dr. Hakan Özkardeş
- Students: 9311
- Location: Ankara, Turkey
- Website: baskent.edu.tr/english/

University rankings

Regional – Overall
- QS Emerging Europe and Central Asia: 301-350 (2022)

Başkent University (Turkish: Başkent Üniversitesi) is a private university in Ankara, Turkey. The university was founded on 13 January 1994 by Professor Dr. Mehmet Haberal. The university center is located in Ankara and also has medical and research centers and dialysis centers all around Turkey.

== History ==
Başkent University, the first private university to teach health sciences in Turkey, was founded in 1993 with the cooperation of the Turkish Organ Transplant and Burns Treatment Foundation and the Haberal Education Foundation.

The university has developed and grown over the past eight years without governmental support. The construction of the buildings began on campus in 1995 and many other facilities have been added since then. Currently the university is considered one of Turkey's elite colleges in terms of its scientific approach in education.

On 19 May 2004, Baskent University started to broadcast TV channel, Kanal B. TV Channel studios and other facilities are located in the campus zone.

== Faculties, departments and schools ==
These faculties and schools are as follows:

- Faculty of Fine Arts, Design and Architecture
  - Visual Arts and Design (Graphic Design)
  - Interior Architecture and Environmental Design
  - Art History
  - Architecture
  - Fashion and Textile Design
- Faculty of Communications
  - Radio Television and Cinema
  - Public Relations
  - Communication Design
  - Knowledge Management
- Faculty of Dentistry
- Faculty of Economic and Administrative Sciences
  - Economics
  - Management
  - Political Science and International Relations
  - Tourism Management
  - Technology and Knowledge Management
- Faculty of Education
  - Computer and Instructional Technology Education
  - Foreign Language Education
  - Elemantry Education, Turkish Language Education
  - Psychological Counsealing and Educational Science Guidance
  - Secondary Education Science And Mathematics Fields Education
  - Secondary Education Social Fields Teaching Department
- Faculty of Engineering
  - Biomedical Engineering
  - Computer Engineering
  - Electrical-Electronics Engineering
  - Industrial Engineering
  - Mechanical Engineering
- Faculty of Health Sciences
  - Nutrition and Dietetics
  - Physical Therapy and Rehabilitation
  - Nursing and Health Services
  - Health Care Management
  - Sport Sciences
  - Social Work
- Faculty of Law
- Faculty of Medicine
- Faculty of Science and Letters
- Faculty of Commercial Sciences
- Faculty of Pharmacy

== Organizations and Institutions associated with the university ==
Centers

- Mithat Coruh Quality Management Center
- Center for Language Studies
- Center for Studies in Atatürk's Principles

Institutes

- Institute of Educational Sciences
- Institute of Health Sciences
- Institute of Science
- Institute of Social Sciences
- Institute of European Union and International Relations
- Institute of Transplantation and Gene Sciences
- Institute of Burn, Fire and Natural Disaster

Vocational Schools

- Vocational School of Social Sciences
- Vocational School of Technology
- Vocational School of Health Sciences

Schools

- Ayşeabla Schools
- Adana Başkent Schools

Hospitals

- Başkent University Ankara Hospital
- Ayaş Physical Therapy and Rehabilitation Center
- Yapracık Geriatric and Psychosocial Rehabilitation Center
- Başkent University Adana Medical and Research Center
- Başkent University İzmir Zübeyde Hanım Medical and Research Center
- Başkent University Medical and Research Center of Alanya
- Başkent University Konya Medical and Research Center
- Başkent University Elmalık (Yalova) Dialysis Center
- Başkent University İskenderun Dialysis Center
- Başkent University İstanbul Dialysis Center
- Başkent University Experimental Research Centers

Hotels

- Patalya Thermal Resort Hotel
- Patalya Lakeside Resort Hotel

== See also ==
- List of universities in Ankara
- List of universities in Turkey
- Education in Turkey
