= Sandy Nairne =

British museum director

Nairne's voice
recorded 2012, as part of an audio description of St Paul's Cathedral for VocalEyes

Alexander Robert Nairne CBE FSA (born 8 June 1953) is a British art historian and curator. From 2002 to February 2015 he was the director of the National Portrait Gallery, London.

== Life and career ==
Nairne was responsible for the successful recovery of two late J. M. W. Turner paintings, stolen in Germany in 1994, and put back on display at Tate Britain in early 2003. He negotiated secretly for eight years on behalf of the Tate to get the two paintings back. His experience is chronicled in his 2011 book, Art Theft and the Case of the Stolen Turners.

Nairne became director of the National Portrait Gallery in London in 2002. In June 2014, he announced his resignation which took effect in early 2015. He was succeeded by Nicholas Cullinan.

He was appointed Commander of the Order of the British Empire (CBE) in the 2011 Birthday Honours for services to the arts.

Nairne was among those appointed in January 2015 to the Bank of England's Banknote Character Advisory Committee, whose first task would be to decide who should appear on the next £20 banknote.
