= Henry Ward (artist) =

British artist (born 1971)

Henry Liam Ward
- Born: 1971 (age 54–55); Essex
- Education: Harrow school; Goldsmiths College; Winchester School of Art
- Notable work: The 'Finger-Assisted' Nephrectomy of Professor Nadey Hakim (2010); Portrait of Queen Elizabeth II (2016)
- Awards: Lincoln Seligman Art Prize (1989); Royal Institute of Oil Painters Winsor and Newton Art Prize (1996); BP Portrait Award (2010)
- Website: www.henryliamward.com

Henry Ward (born 1971) is a British artist, who in 2010 was selected to exhibit his entry of The 'Finger-Assisted' Nephrectomy of Professor Nadey Hakim at the ‘BP Portrait Award’ at the National Portrait Gallery, London, and in 2016 was chosen to paint a portrait of Queen Elizabeth II to mark her 60-year tenure as the longest-serving patron of the British Red Cross.

Ward gained admission to Harrow school, where he excelled in arts, was an arts scholar and won every art prize for the duration of his time there. He trained at Chelsea College of Art and subsequently gained a Bachelor's Degree in Art and art history at Goldsmiths, University of London.

His early exhibitions took place at the Nicholas Lusher Fine Art in Hamilton, Bermuda, before going on to complete a master's at Winchester School of Art and later presenting exhibitions at the Burnaby Gallery in Bermuda and at Tatistcheff's Fifth Avenue gallery in New York.

In 2004, he became part of the International Fundraising Committee of the British Red Cross, for who he raised funds. Other works have included "Faces From The Dark" (2016).

== Early life ==
Henry Liam Ward was born in 1971 in Colchester, Essex. His father, Martyn Ward, was a High Court Judge in England and later a puisne judge in Bermuda. His mother (from Bermuda), encouraged him in arts by introducing him to Rembrandt and how the eyes of subjects in Rembrandt's paintings followed the viewer around the room. Other inspirational artists have included particularly Gustave Courbet and Édouard Manet. He was also inspired by the house he spent his early childhood in. The house, on the Essex-Suffolk border, was designed by a contemporary architect and based on Frank Lloyd Wright's design Fallingwater.

Ward completed his early education between 1984 and 1989 at Harrow School, where he took lessons in the history of art, in addition to life model drawing. He became a Harrow School Art Scholar, winning every art prize for the duration of his attendance there, while at the same time earning the reputation of being "the naughtiest boy at Harrow since Winston Churchill".

After graduating from Harrow, Ward completed his foundation training at the Chelsea College of Art in 1992 and subsequently in 1985 gained a Bachelor's Degree in Art and art history at Goldsmiths College.

== Early work ==
In 1994–1995, Ward presented two exhibitions at the Nicholas Lusher Fine Art in Hamilton, Bermuda, which later established itself as the Lusher Gallery LLC in New York. These works were created at his mother's home in Suffolk, following the deaths of his father and best friend.

In 1996, he completed his master's in "Contemporary Art Theory" at Winchester School of Art, with his thesis on the "history of contemporary figurative painting practice, as evidenced in the work of Eric Fischl and the California Arts Movement".

Later in 1996, Ward presented an exhibition at the Burnaby Gallery in Bermuda. His work entitled Mick earned him the Royal Institute of Oil Painters Winsor and Newton Art Prize and he subsequently moved to New York where he continued his studies of Chuck Close, Eric Fischl, and Cindy Sherman. He set up a studio in the artists neighbourhood of Williamsburg where he was able to network with other artists.

By the age of 28 he had presented exhibitions at Tatistcheff's Fifth Avenue gallery in New York.

== The British Red Cross ==
An avid supporter of the British Red Cross, Ward has been part of its International Fundraising Committee, set up in 2004. He has helped raise funds for the charity and curated a number of exhibitions during his time with them.

== The 'Finger-Assisted' Nephrectomy of Professor Nadey Hakim ==
In 2010, Ward was selected to be an exhibitor at the BP Portrait Awards at the National Portrait Gallery with his painting The 'Finger-Assisted' Nephrectomy of Professor Nadey Hakim, which he based on Rembrandt's The Anatomy Lesson of Dr. Nicolaes Tulp (1632). It was the largest portrait in the exhibition in its 30-year history of the Award. It then toured with the intention of one day being exhibited at the International Museum of Surgical Science in Chicago. In 2012, Sandy Nairne, director of the National Portrait Gallery, included the painting in his book 500 Portraits: 25 Years of The BP Portrait Award.

== Portrait of Queen Elizabeth II ==
Ward was commissioned by the British Red Cross to paint a portrait of Her Majesty Queen Elizabeth II to celebrate her 60-year tenure as the longest-serving patron of the British Red Cross. After taking photographs of the Queen during a two-hour sitting at Windsor Castle, he carried out the work in secret in his converted garage in Burlington. He was influenced by past royal portrait painters including Anthony van Dyck and Sir Joshua Reynolds.

The painting, titled "Her Majesty Queen Elizabeth II with the founder of the British Red Cross Henri Dunant" was unveiled by Queen Elizabeth at Windsor Castle in October 2016.

Ward was congratulated by Premier of Bermuda, Michael Dunkley.

== Other works and exhibitions ==
Ward's painting Bermuda Man (1999), is on display at the Bermuda National Gallery.

In 2006, his work was included with the Harrow School alumni in "A Celebration of Art from Harrow School in London", held at Christie's.

His exhibition "Faces From The Dark" (2016) was presented in Bermuda with the intention to "propound(s) the equality of all people regardless of race, background or religious bearing".

== Awards ==
- Lincoln Seligman Art Prize (1989).
- Royal Institute of Oil Painter's Winsor and Newton Art Prize (1996).
- ‘BP Portrait Award’ (2010).

== Personal and family ==
Four years prior to the unveiling of the portrait of the Queen, Ward and his family moved from London to Burlington.
