= Nadey Hakim =

British-Lebanese professor of transplantation surgery

Nadey S. Hakim FRCS FRCSI FACS FASMBS
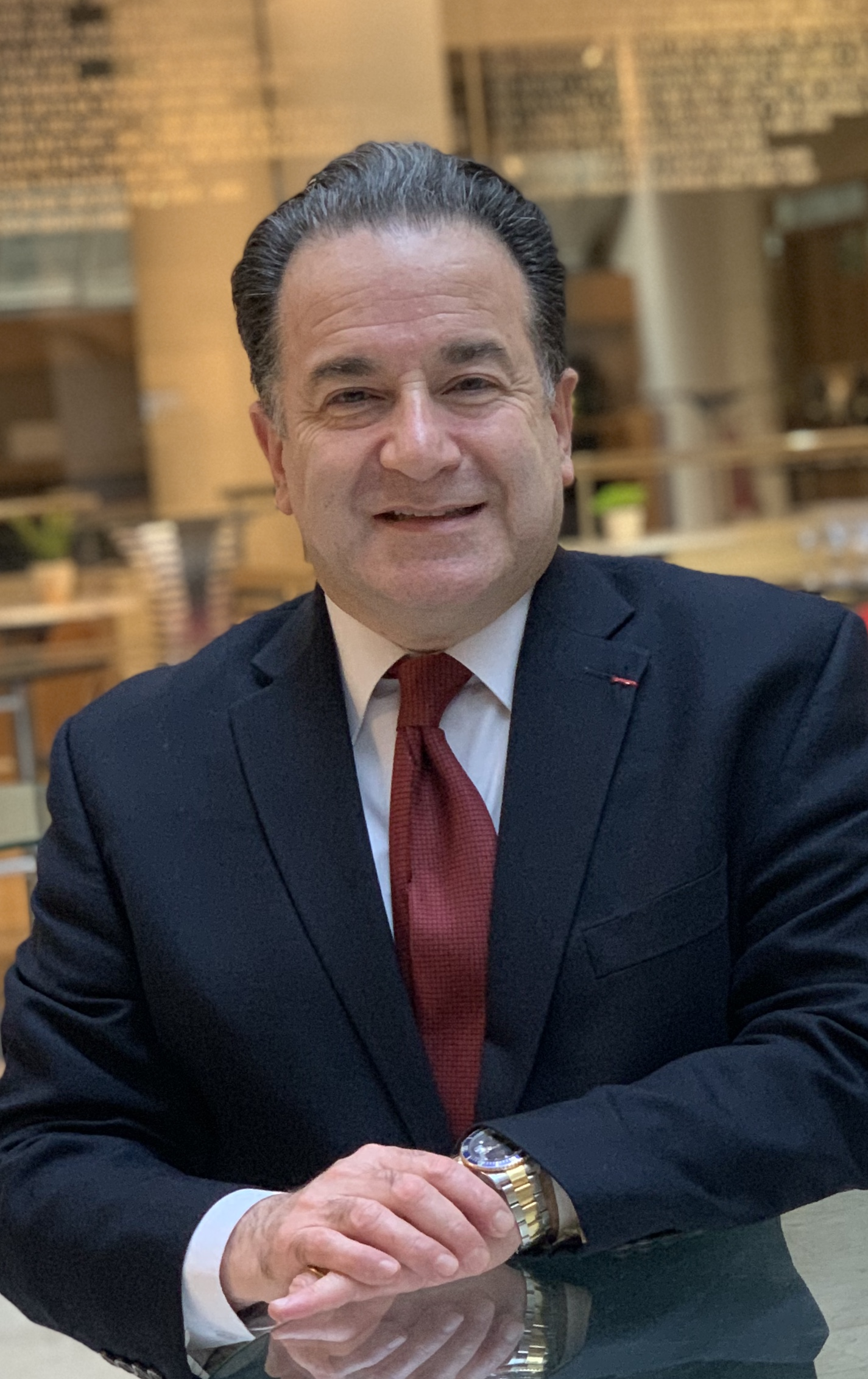
- Nadey Hakim, 2020
- Born: 9 April 1958 (age 68)
- Education: Paris Descartes University; University of London
- Known for: Kidney transplantation; Pancreas transplantation; Hand transplantation (1998); Art and music
- Medical career
- Profession: Surgeon
- Institutions: Guy's Hospital; St Mary's Hospital; Hammersmith Hospital; Imperial College; Cleveland Clinic London
- Sub-specialties: Organ transplantation; Bariatric surgery
- Awards: Lauréat de la Faculté de Médecine de Paris; J. Wesley Alexander Prize; Makhzoumi Foundation Prize for Medicine; Chevalier de la Legion d'Honneur
- Website: Official website

Nadey S. Hakim FRCS FRCSI FACS FASMBS (born 9 April 1958), is a British-Lebanese professor of transplantation surgery at Imperial College London and general surgeon at the Cleveland Clinic London. He is also a writer, musician and sculptor, known for kidney and pancreas transplantations, and being part of the surgical team that performed the world's first hand transplantation in 1998 and then the double arm transplantation in 2000.

Several of his sculptures are on display around the world, including President Macron at the Élysée Palace in Paris, Pope Francis at the Vatican, Michelangelo's David in the Madonna del Parto Museum collection, and Kim Jong-un at the Pyongyang Museum in North Korea.

After graduating in medicine from Paris Descartes University now called Université Paris Cité and completing his surgical training and Fellowships from Guy's Hospital in London, the Mayo Clinic and the University of Minnesota in the States, the Soviet Union and University College London, he became appointed to St Mary's Hospital where in 1995, he performed London's first pancreas transplantation. He was part of the team that performed the first kidney transplantation in the Arab world in 2003, during the Iraq War, and later developed a kidney transplant technique using an unusually small incision. The procedure was depicted in Henry Ward's 2010 painting The 'Finger-Assisted' Nephrectomy of Professor Nadey Hakim', commissioned to raise awareness of legal organ donations. Subsequently, in 2013, he performed the first kidney transplantation in Abuja, Nigeria.

Following an 'unfair' dismissal by Imperial College Healthcare NHS Trust in 2015, he was reinstated in 2016 after a tribunal. In the same year, he received the Chevalier de la Legion d'Honneur at a ceremony held at the French Embassy in London. The following year, Imperial appointed him as their president's envoy. Between 2018 and 2019, he became visiting professor of surgery at the Faculty of Medicine in Belgrade, and received an Honorary Doctorate from the Beirut Arab University and a Doctor of Arts degree from the University of Bolton.

His role in writing and editing have included producing over 23 textbooks and 150 peer-reviewed papers, being editor-in-chief of the International Surgery and an editorial board member for the journals Transplantation Proceedings and Graft. In his role in global health issues, he has been involved in collaborations tackling disease in Africa and has raised the issue of the risks of unregulated trade in organ donation.

As a musician, he plays the clarinet and his performances include the hymn 'Jerusalem', dedicated to the children of Lebanon, and in A Time Remembered as a tribute to Air France pilot, Michel Bacos.

== Early life and education ==
Nadey S. Hakim was born in Britain, in 1958 into a Lebanese family. As a teenager, when in Lebanon, he witnessed the war. He later recalled that while the city was under fire from bombs and rockets, "the thing I used to do was put my headphones on and listen to music because I played the clarinet. Schools were closed… We didn't think we would survive." He spent this time reading and learning languages, eventually nine in all including French, Italian, German, Russian, Arabic, Hebrew and Japanese, and fled Lebanon before completing school. He was inspired by his father.

== Career ==
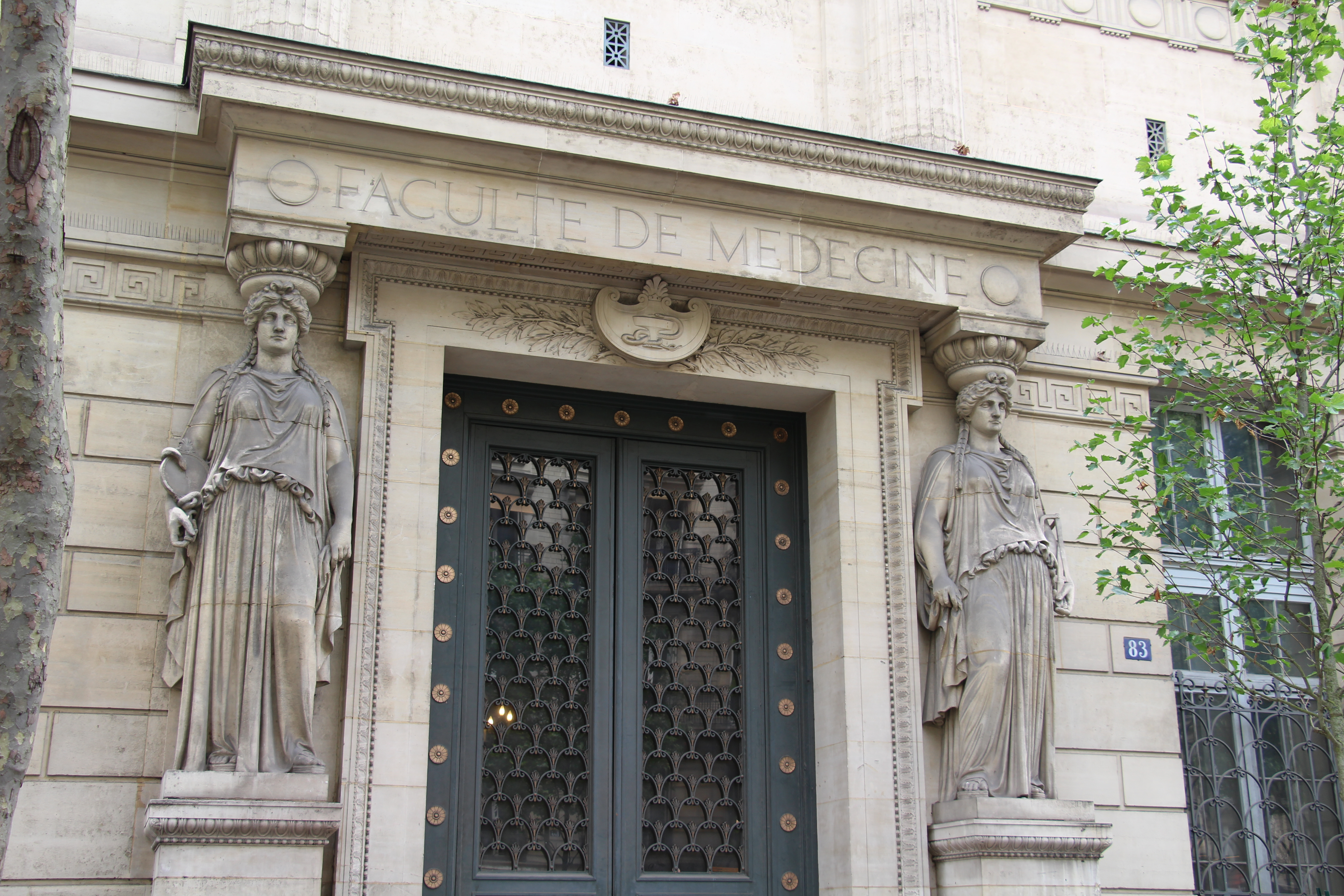
Paris Descartes University: Faculté de Medecine

Hakim is a laureate of Cochin Port Royal Hospital Medical School and received his MD from Paris Descartes University in 1984. He subsequently began his surgical training at Guy's Hospital, London.

In 1988, he completed a fellowship in gastrointestinal surgery from the Mayo Clinic, before gaining an International College of Surgeons (ICS) travelling scholarship to the Soviet Union in 1989, and then returning to London to finish his thesis on intestinal transplantation and receive his PhD from University College London in 1991. In 1993, he completed his surgical training at Guy's, before being awarded a fellowship in transplantation at the University of Minnesota, which he completed in 1995.

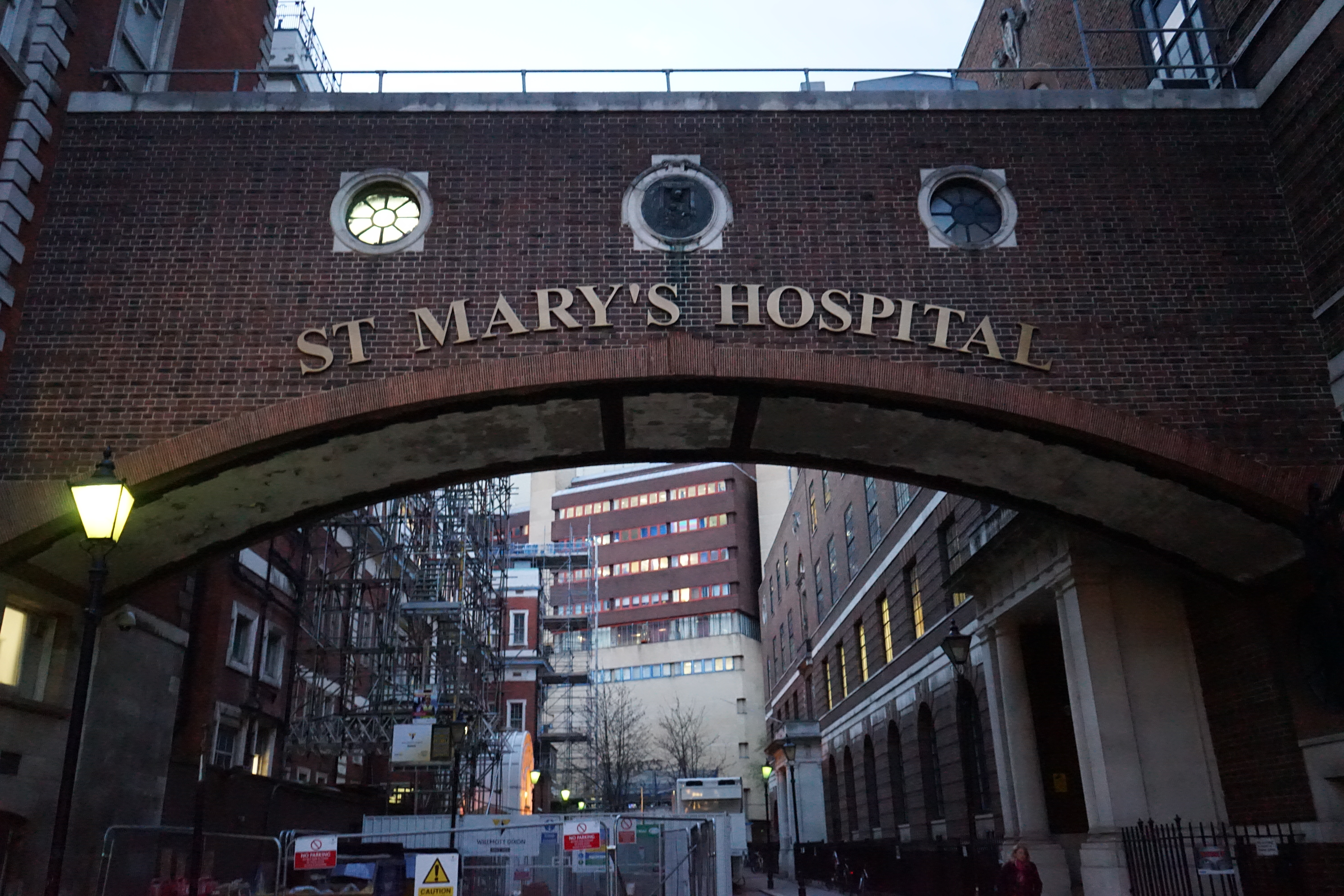
St Mary's hospital in london

In 1995, he performed London's first pancreas transplantation at St Mary's Hospital and began the first pancreas transplant programme in South East England.

=== Limb transplantation ===
Hakim had hoped that the world's first hand transplantation would be performed in London. Instead, representing Britain, in September 1998, then working at St Mary's Hospital, London, he joined the team led by Jean-Michel Dubernard at the Édouard Herriot Hospital in Lyon, that then performed the world's first hand transplantation, an operation that took 14 hours. The recipient of the donor hand, Clint Hallam, failed to follow aftercare directions and later requested that the transplanted hand be removed. Hakim amputated the hand in February 2001 in London.

In 2000, he was one of 20 surgeons, led by Dubernard, involved in the transplantation of two arms on a 33-year-old Frenchman who had lost both his arms in an explosive accident fours years earlier.

=== Kidney transplantation ===
He revealed in an interview that one of the surgeons who inspired Hakim and whom he met, was the American Joseph Murray, who performed the first successful kidney transplantation in 1954, an operation involving two identical twins and the donor being live.

In an article in Experimental and Clinical Transplantation (2016), Hakim recalled being invited to Yemen by professor Hussain Al Kaff to visit Aden, Yemen to attend the first International Yemeni Conference on Nephro-Urology in March 2003, during the Iraq War. During the visit, a Saudi team led by Faissal Shaheen from the Saudi Centre for Organ Transplantation, together with the Austrians, Robert Fitzgerald, Felix Stockenhuber and Annilies Fitzgerald, and Hakim who led Al Kaff's doctors from Aden, performed 10 operations, consisting of five living related kidney transplantations in one sitting over 20 hours, despite political instability and its near abandonment. These were the first kidney transplantations in the Arab world, which, as a result, led to the establishment of The Arab European Foundation, with the mission "to help poor Arab countries" and the motto of "poverty should not be a barrier to health or education!".

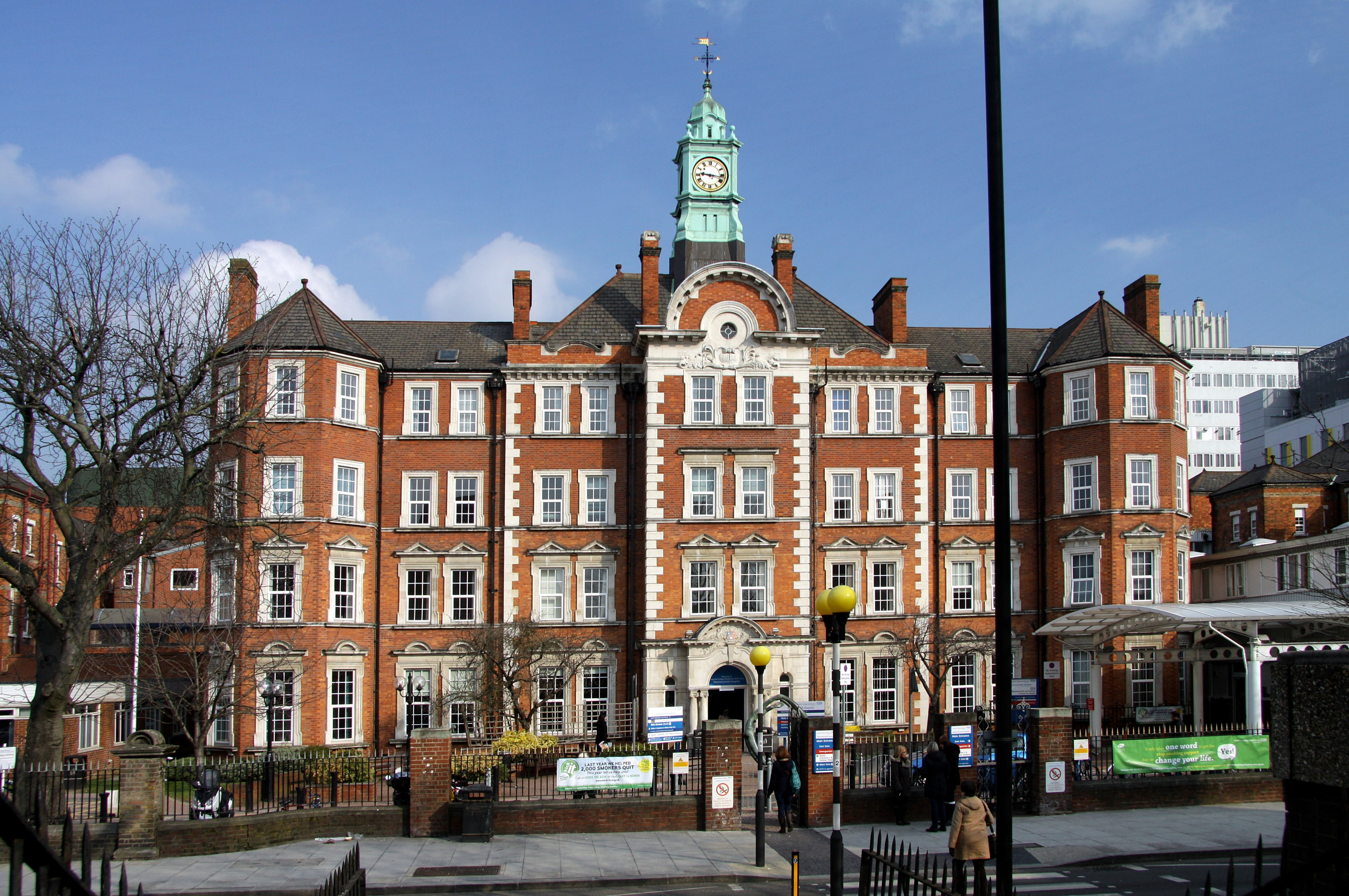
Hammersmith Hospital, London

During Hakim's appointment as surgical director of the West London Renal and Transplant Centre at Hammersmith Hospital, he developed a kidney transplant technique using an unusually small 2.5 cm incision. In 2010 the procedure was depicted in a painting commissioned to raise awareness of legal organ donations, titled "The 'Finger-Assisted' Nephrectomy of Professor Nadey Hakim'", by Henry Ward, and was exhibited at the National Portrait Gallery, London, as part of the BP Portrait Awards.

As adjunct professor of transplantation surgery at Imperial College London, in November 2013, he performed the first kidney transplant at the Garki Hospital in Abuja, Nigeria. Over the subsequent five days, a total of eight living related kidney transplantations were performed at the hospital, and all using the finger assisted technique.

In 2016, following a dispute about him operating on two private patients and an NHS patient on the same day in 2013, resulting in a subsequent suspension in 2014 and dismissal in 2015, he was reinstated by the Trust after a tribunal concluded that the dismissal was "unfair".

=== Other roles ===
Hakim has been an advisor on transplantation issues to the National Institute for Health and Care Excellence and has been an examiner for the Royal College of Surgeons of England. His private practice is in Harley Street. As a bariatric surgeon, he is a member of The International Bariatric Surgery Review Committee (IBSRC) 2010. He is also a general surgeon at The Cleveland Clinic London.

He has worked with several journals including editor-in-chief of International Surgery, and as editorial board member for Transplantation Proceedings and Graft, and for the International Journal of Organ Transplantation Medicine. With Jean-Michel Dubernard, and Earl Owen, he co-edited the textbook Composite Tissue Allograft. It included an introduction by Sir Roy Calne. He co-edited the book Surgical Complications: Diagnosis and Treatment, which was reviewed by Sir Harold Ellis.

Hakim is a supporter of the Conservative party and has been involved in global health issues including the issue of 'black market organs' and the risks of the unregulated trade in organ donation. He has been involved in collaborations tackling disease in Africa. In 2019 he was appointed vice-president of the British Red Cross.

== Art and music ==
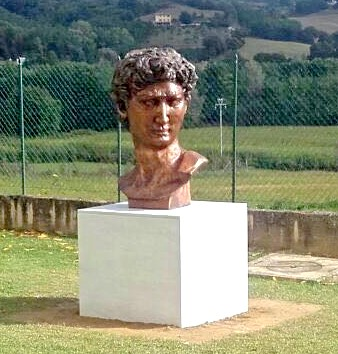
Replica of Michelangelo's David, Nadey Hakim - Monterchi, Italy (2016)

He is a portrait sculptor and in 2016 was winner of the Baron's Prize, Medical Art Society. Hakim's list of busts include:

- Michelangelo Buonarroti's David which became included in the Madonna del Parto Museum collection.
- Roger Williams,
- Queen Elizabeth II in 2013,
- David Cameron (2014), unveiled at the Carlton Club in London,
- Theresa May at Downing Street.
- President Macron at the Élysée Palace.
- Pope Francis (2017), at the Vatican.
- Kim Jong-un (2018), at the Pyongyang Museum in North Korea. Hakim was subsequently asked to create Moon Jae-in.
- Senior Selvanayagam (2019).
- Donald Trump
- Boris Johnson
- Vladimir Putin
- David Bernstein
- Narendra Modi

Having learnt to play the clarinet as a child, he continues to play and has recorded several CDs. Some pieces have been conducted and performed with composer and multi-instrumentalist, Darryl John Kennedy. The Wisconsin television programme Look-In, featured them both performing the hymn Jerusalem, on a CD entitled A Promise for Peace and dedicated to the children of Lebanon. Together, they also performed A Time Remembered, as a tribute to Air France pilot, Michel Bacos.

== Awards and honours ==
In 1989, during his travelling scholarship to the Soviet, Hakim was elected a member of the Soviet Surgical Society. He has been awarded honorary professorships from the universities of Lyon, Peru, Ankara and São Paulo, and has been a visiting professor to several universities including Harvard University and the Cleveland Clinic.

On 4 December 2008, at the World Congress of the ICS, of which he was previously a president, Hakim was appointed the first Max Thorek Professor of Surgery, an endowed chair of surgery set up in the name of Max Thorek who founded the ICS. In 2010, he was awarded the Bailiff Grand Cross Order of St John of Jerusalem. He became the 35th president of the ICS. He has been president of the section of transplantation of the Royal Society of Medicine and between 2014 and 2016 was the Society's vice president.

In January 2016, he was appointed to the rank of Chevalier de la Legion d'Honneur by President Francois Hollande. The ceremony was held at the French Embassy in London, where he received commendations from both Secretary of State for Health at the time Jeremy Hunt and French ambassador Sylvie Bermann. He was elected vice president of Conservative Health April 2016. In June 2017 he was appointed as president's Envoy of Imperial College London and he was also appointed vice-president of the International Medical Sciences Academy.

In March 2018, Hakim was appointed as Visiting Professor of Surgery at the Faculty of Medicine in Belgrade. At this same ceremony, the new book Surgery for Benign Oesophageal Disorders was officially promoted. The following month, he was appointed as Ambassador to the All-party parliamentary group for diabetes. In the same year, he received an Honorary Doctorate from the Beirut Arab University at its 59th anniversary. In 2019, he received a Doctor of Arts degree for his contribution to aesthetics from the University of Bolton. In 2021 he became honorary fellow of the Royal College of Surgeons of Glasgow. In the same year he received the Order of Saint Agatha from the Republic of San Marino.

In 2021 Hakim was awarded the Order of Friendship. In 2026 he was appointed president of the History of Medicine Society, at the Royal Society of Medicine, London.

== Family and personal life ==
Hakim married Nicole and they have four children.

== Selected publications ==
=== Books ===
- Enteric Physiology of the Transplanted Intestine. R. G. Landes, Austin, Texas (1994). ISBN 1570590109. Co-edited with Michael G. Sarr
- Transplantation Surgery. Springer Verlag, London (2001). doi:10.1007/978-1-4471-3689-7 ISBN 9781849968591. Co-edited with Gabriel Danovitch
- Pancreas and Islet Transplantation. Oxford University Press, Oxford (2002). ISBN 9780199565863. Co-edited with Robert J. Stratta, Peter Friend and Alan Colman
- Surgical Complications: Diagnosis and Treatment. Imperial College Press, London (2007). ISBN 9781860946929. Co-edited with Vassilios E. Papalois
- Composite Tissue Allograft. Imperial College Press, London (2006). ISBN 1-86094-651-8. Co-edited with Jean-Michel Dubernard, Earl Owen
- Artificial Organs. Springer-Verlag London (2009). doi:10.1007/978-1-84882-283-2. ISBN 978-1-84882-281-8.
- Living Related Transplantation. Imperial College Press, London (2010). ISBN 978-1-84816-497-0. Co-edited with Ruben Canelo and Vassilios Papalois
- Bariatric Surgery. Imperial College Press, London (2011). ISBN 9781848165885. Co-edited with Franco Favretti, Bruno Dilemans and Gianni Segato

=== Book chapters ===
- Whole Organ Pancreas Transplantation. In Nagy A. Habib and Ruben Canelo's Liver and Pancreatic Diseases Management. Springer, Boston (2006). ISBN 978-0-387-28548-1

=== Articles ===
- Hakim, NS (1998). "Pancreas transplantation". Ann R Coll Surg Engl. 80: 313–5. PMC 2503125. PMID 9849329.
- Hakim, NS (2001). "Recent developments and future prospects in pancreatic and islet transplantation". Diabetes Obes Metab. 3: 9–15. doi:10.1046/j.1463-1326.2001.00138.x. PMID 11213600.
- Michel Dubernard, Jean; Owen, Earl R; Lanzetta, Marco; Hakim, Nadey (2001). "What is happening with hand transplants?". The Lancet. 357: 1711–1712. doi:10.1016/S0140-6736(00)04846-7..
- Hakim, NS (2002). "Pancreatic transplantation for patients with Type I diabetes". HPB (Oxford). 4: 59–61. doi:10.1080/136518202760378407. PMC 2020536. PMID 18332925.
- Dubernard, JM; Petruzzo, P; Lanzetta, M; Parmentier, H; Martin, X; Dawahra, M; Hakim, NS; Owen, E (2003). "Functional results of the first human double-hand transplantation". Ann Surg. 238: 128–36. doi:10.1097/01.SLA.0000078945.70869.82. PMC 1422660. PMID 12832975.
- Hakim, N.; Aboutaleb, E.; Syed, A.; Rajagopal, P.; Herbert, P.; Canelo, R.; Papalois, V. (2010). "A Fast and Safe Living Donor "Finger-Assisted" Nephrectomy Technique: Results of 359 Cases". Transplantation Proceedings. 42: 165–170. doi:10.1016/j.transproceed.2009.12.042.
- Thiruchelvam, PT; Willicombe, M; Hakim, N; Taube, D; Papalois, V (2011). "Renal transplantation". BMJ. 343 d7300. doi:10.1136/bmj.d7300. PMID 22084316.
- Hakim, N; Miner, E; Hakim, D; El Tayyar, A (2016). "Kidney Transplant in Third World Countries". Exp Clin Transplant. 14: 19–20. PMID 27805504.
