= W. P. Andrew Lee =

Chinese American surgeon

- 李為平
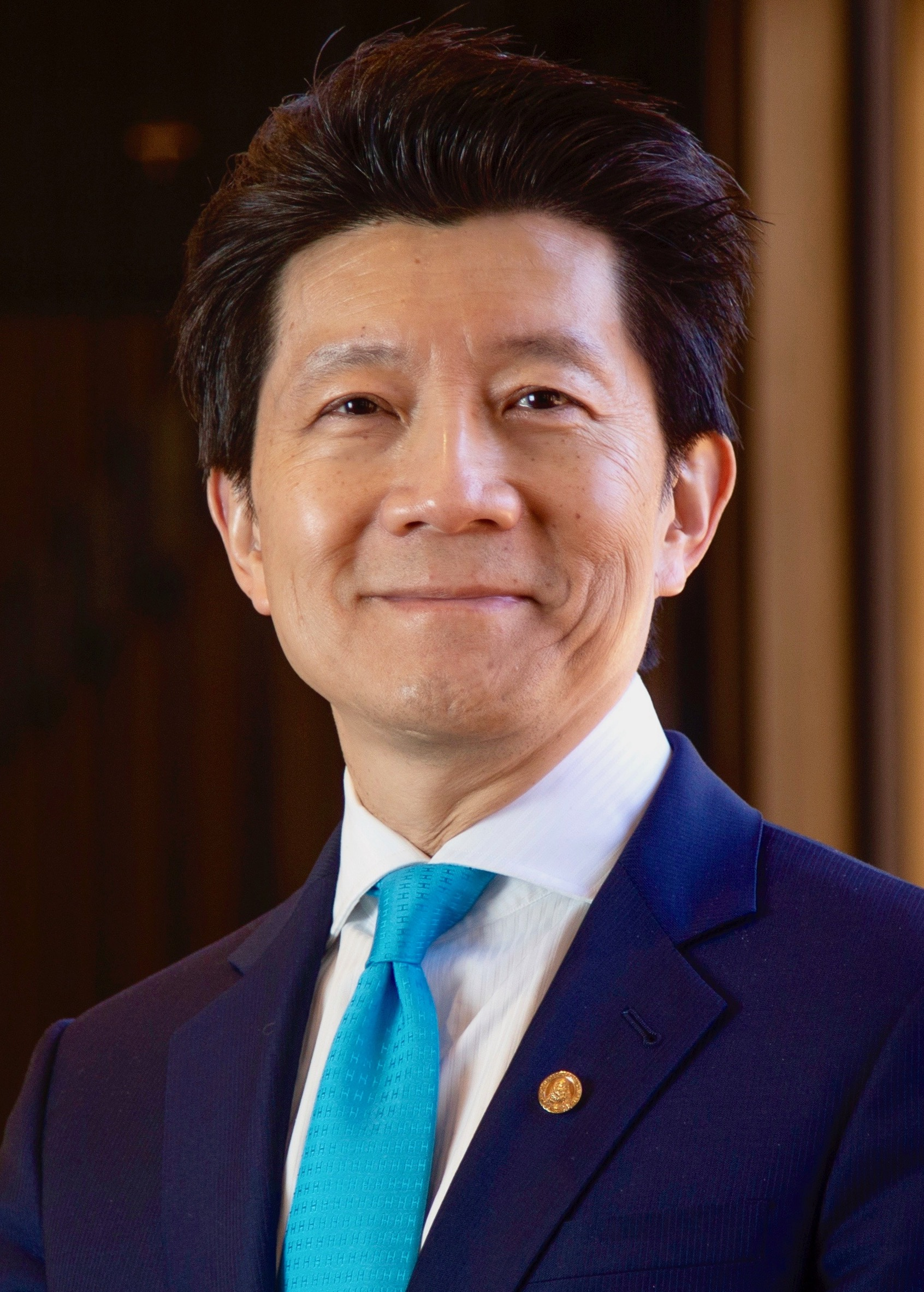
- Lee in 2024
- Born: 1957 (age 68–69); Kaohsiung, Taiwan
- Education: Harvard University (BA); Johns Hopkins University (MD)
- Scientific career
- Fields: Hand Surgery
- Workplaces: Massachusetts General Hospital; University of Pittsburgh; Johns Hopkins University; University of Texas Southwestern Medical Center

Wei-Ping Andrew Lee (Chinese: 李為平; pinyin: Lǐ Wéipíng; born c. 1957) is a Taiwanese-American hand surgeon and medical researcher. He is the dean of the University of Texas Southwestern Medical School and the provost of the University of Texas Southwestern Medical Center. Lee focuses on translational research on immune modulation for vascularized composite allotransplantation (VCA) and the implementation of protocols to minimize immunosuppression in hand transplant and other VCA programs.

== Early life and education ==
Lee was born in Gangshan, Kaohsiung, Taiwan. His father, Lee Hsueh-yan, was a general in the Republic of China Air Force.

Lee immigrated to the United States at the age of 15 to join his siblings. He followed his siblings to different towns due to their job re-location, and went to three high schools in three years while adapting to his new country and learning a new language.

Lee graduated with honors from Harvard College in 1979 with a bachelor's degree in physics. He received his medical degree from Johns Hopkins School of Medicine, where he also completed his general surgery residency. He received plastic surgery training at the Massachusetts General Hospital and completed his orthopedic hand fellowship at the Indiana Hand to Shoulder Center. In 1991, he joined the academic faculty at Massachusetts General Hospital, Harvard Medical School, where he became the Director of Plastic Surgery Research Laboratory and Chief of Hand Service in Department of Surgery.

== Career ==
In 2002, Lee was named the division chief of plastic surgery at the University of Pittsburgh School of Medicine. In 2010, he moved to Johns Hopkins Hospital to become the inaugural chairman of the Department of Plastic and Reconstructive Surgery. From 2010 to 2019, he was the Milton T. Edgerton, M.D., Professor and Chairman of the Department of Plastic and Reconstructive Surgery at Johns Hopkins. He chaired the Associate Professor Promotion Committee of the Johns Hopkins School of Medicine from 2014 to 2017 and was Chair of the Medical Board from 2016 to 2018.

In 2019, Lee became the 16th dean of the University of Texas Southwestern Medical School and executive vice president for academic affairs and provost of UT Southwestern Medical Center where he is Professor of Plastic Surgery and holds the Atticus James Gill, M.D. Chair in Medical Science. He currently oversees four degree-granting schools, 3,700 faculty members, total research expenditure of nearly $800 million, and education of about 4,300 students and trainees.

== Research ==
A hand surgeon and translational researcher, Lee investigates tolerance strategy for vascularized composite allografts (VCA) to ameliorate the need for long-term systemic immunosuppression. He has been principal investigator on numerous federal research grants totaling over $10 million.

Lee established multidisciplinary programs for hand transplantation at Johns Hopkins and the University of Pittsburgh using an immunomodulatory protocol based upon the work from his laboratory. He led the surgical team that performed the first bilateral hand transplant (2009) and the first trans-humeral transplant (2010) in the United States. A key feature of the protocol is single-agent immunosuppression that aims to minimize the long-term risks of VCA. He has led one of the largest hand and arm transplant programs in the field, and his group was especially focused on restoring functions to military servicemen with upper extremity amputations that resulted from combat injuries.

In March 2018, Lee oversaw the team that performed the world's first total penis and scrotum transplant. The operation included transplants of the penis, scrotum, and abdominal wall to a wounded serviceman and was the most complex surgery of its type.

Lee has authored about 240 original peer-reviewed publications and 40 textbook chapters and co-edited the book Transplantation of Composite Tissue Allografts, (2008). He has served on the editorial boards of Transplantation, Journal of Surgical Research' and Hand. He co-founded Vascularized Composite Allo-transplantation in 2014 and serves as its co-Editor.

== Honors and awards ==
- 2021 Honorary Citation in Recognition of Development of the Specialty of Plastic Surgery, American Society of Plastic Surgeons
- 2018 American Association of Plastic Surgeons Ti-Sheng Chang Award Winner, American Association of Plastic Surgeons
- 2018 Mentor of the Year, Plastic Surgery Research Council
- 2018 Leonard R. Rubin Award, American Association of Plastic Surgeons
- 2015 Distinguished Alumnus Award, Johns Hopkins University
- 2014 Research Achievement Award for Basic Science, American Association of Plastic Surgeons
- 2014 Andrew J. Weiland Medal for Outstanding Research in Hand Surgery, American Society for Surgery of the Hand
- 2002 Sterling Bunnell Traveling Fellowship, American Society for Surgery of the Hand
- 1995 Summer L. Koch Award, American Society for Surgery of the Hand
- 1991 Kappa Delta Young Investigator Award, American Academy of Orthopaedic Surgeons

== Society Leadership ==
- 2024-Present: Association of American Medical Colleges Council of Deans Administrative Board
- 2023-2024 President, American Association of Plastic Surgeons
- 2019-2020 President, American Association for Hand Surgery
- 2014-2016 President, American Society of Reconstructive Transplantation
- 2012-2013 Chair, American Board of Plastic Surgery
- 2011-2012 President, American Society for Surgery of the Hand
- 2010 President, Robert H. Ivey Pennsylvania Plastic Surgery Society
- 2001-2002 Chair, Plastic Surgery Research Council

== Publications ==
- Lee WPA, Yaremchuk MJ, Pan YC, Randolph MA, Tan CM, Weiland AJ. Relative Antigenicity of Components of a Vascularized Limb Allograft. Plastic Reconstructive Surg, 87:401, 1991.
- Lee WPA, Mathes D. Hand Transplantation: Pertinent Data/Future Outlook. J Hand Surg, 24A:906, 1999.
- Lee WPA, Rubin JP, Bourget JL, Cober SR, Randolph MA, Nielsen GP, Ierino FL, Sachs DH. Tolerance to Limb Tissue Allografts B/w Swine Matched for Major Histocompatibility Complex Antigens. Plastic Reconstr Surg, 107:1482, 2001.
- Mathes DW, Randolph MA, Solari MG, Nazzal JA, Nielson GP, Arn JS, Sachs DH, Lee WPA. Split Tolerance to a Composite Tissue Allograft in a Swine Model. Transplantation, 75:25-31, 2003.
- Hettiaratchy S, Melendy E, Randolph MA, Coburn RC, Neville DM, Sachs DH, Huang C, Lee WPA. Tolerance to Composite Tissue Allografts Across a Major Histocompatibility Barrier in Miniature Swine. Transplantation, 77:514, 2004.
- Solari MG, Washington KM, Sacks JM, Hautz T, Unadkat JV, Horibe E, Venkataramanan R, Larregina AT, Thomson AW, Lee WPA. Daily Topical Tacrolimus Therapy Prevents Skin Rejection in a Rodent Hind Limb Allograft Model. Plast Reconstr Surg, 123:17S-25S, 2009.
- Unadkat J, Schneeberger S, Horibe EH, Goldbach C, Solari MG, Washington KM, Gorantla VS, Cooper GM, Thomson AW, Lee WPA. Composite Tissue Vasculopathy and Degeneration Following Multiple Episodes of Acute Rejection in Reconstructive Transplantation. Am J Transplant, 10:251, 2010.
- Schneeberger S, Gorantla VS, Brandacher G, Zeevi A, Demetris AJ, Lunz JG, Metes DM, Donnenberg AD, Shores JT, Dimartini AF, Kiss JE, Imbriglia JE, Azari K, Goitz RJ, Manders EK, Nguyen VT, Cooney DS, Wachtman GS, Keith J, Fletcher D, Macedo C, Planinsic R, Losee J, Shapiro R, Starzl TE, Lee WPA. Upper Extremity Transplantation Using a Cell-Based Protocol to Minimize Immunosuppression. Ann Surg, 257:345-351, 2013.
- Shores JT, Brandacher G, Lee WPA. Hand and Upper Extremity Transplantation: An Update of Outcomes in the Worldwide Experience. Plast Reconstr Surg, 135(2):351e-360e, 2015
- Lee WPA. Hand Transplantation: Evolution of a Personal Outlook. J Hand Surg, 42(4):286-290, 2017.
- Redett RJ, Etra JW, Brandacher G, Burnett AL, Tuffaha SH, Sacks JM, Shores JT, Bivalacqua TJ, Bonawitz S, Cooney CM, Coon D, Pustavoitau A, Rizkalla NA, Jackson AM, Javia V, Fidder SAJ, Davis-Sproul J, Breenan DC, Sander IB, Shoham S, Sopko NA, Lee WPA, Cooney DS. Total Penis, Scrotum, and Lower Abdominal Wall Transplantation. N Engl J Med, 381(19):1876-1878m, 2019.
- Etra JW, Shores JT, Sander IB, Brandacher G, Lee WPA. Trauma-Induced Rejection in Vascularized Composite Allotransplantation. Ann Surg, 271(5);e113-114, 2020.
