= Faissal Shaheen =

Saudi nephrologist

- Known for: First kidney transplantation in the Arab World (2003); Co-founder of the Jeddah kidney center in King Fahad Hospital Jeddah and the Saudi Center for Organ Transplantation
- Medical career
- Profession: Nephrologist

Faissal Shaheen is a Saudi nephrologist and co-founder of the Jeddah kidney center in King Fahad Hospital Jeddah and the Saudi Center for Organ Transplantation. In 2003 he led the Saudi team involved in the first kidney transplantation in the Arab World, in Aden, Yemen. He is the president of the International Society for Organ Donation and Procurement from 2019 to 2021.

== Biography ==
Shaheen studied at Mansoura University in Egypt and graduated in 1980. He underwent specialist training (Fachartz) in internal medicine and nephrology from the Vienna Medical Academy of Postgraduate Medical Education and Research in 1987. In 2002, he earned a fellowship at the Royal College of Surgeons in Edinburgh. He worked as director general of the Saudi Centre for Organ Transplantation until 2018.
