= Warren C. Breidenbach =

American hand surgeon

Warren C. Breidenbach III (born California) is an American hand surgeon most well known for having performed the first long-term successful hand transplant surgery in the world at Jewish Hospital in Louisville, Kentucky. The surgery was performed by Breidenbach and hand surgeon Tsu-Min Tsai, both of Kleinert, Kutz and Associates Hand Care Center, leading a team of surgeons to attach a donor left hand to replace New Jersey native Matthew Scott's left hand. The Louisville hand surgery team went on to perform additional hand transplants between 1999 and 2011, when Breidenbach relocated to the University of Arizona in Tucson, Arizona to start a Composite Tissue Allotransplantation center at the university's medical center.

Breidenbach attributes the team's success in the first hand transplant to feasibility studies and research, including reviews of the medical literature, prior to the clinical procedure.

Breidenbach graduated from the University of Calgary.
