= International Medical Sciences Academy =

Global medical organization

- Nickname: IMSA
- Formation: 1981
- Headquarters: New Delhi, India
- Fields: Biomedical research; Medical education; Health care delivery
- President: K Jagadeesan
- Vice president: Nadey Hakim
- Executive director: R K Thukral
- Website: www.imsaonline.com

The International Medical Sciences Academy (IMSA) is a global organization founded in 1981 with the aim of improving universal health. It is registered as a professional body under the Societies Registration Act of India and is based in New Delhi, India. It publishes the Journal of the International Medical Sciences Academy and is an associate member of the Council for International Organizations of Medical Sciences.

== Mission ==
IMSA has its aims in three scientific areas;

- Biomedical research
- Medical education
- Health care delivery.

== Operations ==
The IMSA has 28 sections, known as “chapters”, covering all disciplines of medicine and hosts an annual convention (IMSACON) held in different parts of the world. The chapters plan educational events including workshops and seminars, to disseminate knowledge to other medical professionals and the public. In addition, they incorporate programmes involving rural areas.

Headed by its president, a board of trustees consisting of members from around the world, provide an administrative role for the IMSA. It consists of a Central Executive Committee and a General Body and offers Fellowships for senior professionals (FIMSA) and Memberships for junior professionals (MIMSA). These are screened and selected by both the Board of Trustees and a Central Credential Committee. The IMSA also offers Honorary Fellowships to those felt to be outstanding.

It collaborates with the Royal College of Physicians and Surgeons of Glasgow.

== History and development ==
IMSA was recognised as a global association in 1981, when it became registered under the Societies registration Act XXI of 1861 in India. It also became an Associate Member of Council for International Organizations of Medical Sciences - CIOMS, Geneva.

By 2012, it had around 3000 fellows and members including some Nobel laureates.

=== Events and Honorary fellowships ===
In 2007, the former judge of the Kerala and Madras High Courts K. Narayana Kurup received an Honorary Fellowship.

In October 2012, an Honorary Fellowship of the IMSA was awarded to Sheikh Humaid Bin Rashid Al Nuaimi during a ceremony held at Ajman Kempinski Hotel. Thumbay Moideen, founder president, board of governors of Gulf Medical University, Ajman also received an Honorary Fellowship at the same event, in addition to space scientist Sunita Williams and founder of Dr. M.G.R. Educational and Research Institute A. C. Shanmugam.

In August 2018, Mehmet Haberal attended the 37th Congress of the IMSA, held in Glasgow, Scotland, as a guest of honour. He presented a lecture on "Experimental and Clinical Application of Ileobladder Technique in Kidney Transplantation for Very Small and/or Neurogenic Bladder" following which he was awarded the IMSA Honorary Fellowship. Steven D. Wexner also received an honorary FIMSA at this event.

Other recipients of the IMSA Honorary Fellowship include transplant surgeon Nadey Hakim and scientist Baldev Raj.

== Past presidents ==
Years	Name	Comments
1981	K N Rao	
2019	K Jagadeesan	
