= Tamzin Cuming =

British surgeon

- Cuming in 2023
- Medical career
- Profession: Surgeon
- Institutions: Homerton University Hospital, Cleveland Clinic London
- Sub-specialties: Anal Neoplasia, anal cancer prevention
- Research: Colorectal surgery, sexual misconduct in surgery
- Website: https://tamzincuming.com/

Tamzin Cuming is a British surgeon specialising in colorectal surgery and anal cancer prevention. Cumming is a fellow of the Royal College of Surgeons of England. She served as chair of the college's Women in Surgery Forum from 2021 to 2024. Cumming is also the President of the International Anal Neoplasia Society.

== Early life and education ==
Cuming was born in 1970. She attended Queen Elizabeth's School in Faversham, where she obtained her A-levels in 1988.

Cuming studied medicine and English at Newnham College, Cambridge. Cuming graduated in 1988 and went onto train at Guy's and St Thomas' Hospitals, qualifying in 1994. She completed her surgical training in Brighton and then undertook the North East Thames National Training Programme. She holds a master's degree in surgical education from Imperial College London and is a Fellow of the Royal College of Surgeons of England. She also trained with surgeon Bruno Roche in Geneva, Switzerland.

== Career ==
Cuming became a consultant surgeon at Homerton University Hospital in 2013. Her speciality is colorectal surgery. She runs the hospital's anal cancer prevention centre.

In 2016, Cuming appeared in the viral video Inspiring the Future, produced by the charity Education and Employers, where children aged 5–7 were asked to draw people to illustrate certain occupations; the vast majority drew men. Cuming was one of the professionals then revealed herself to children. The video has been globally over 100 million views and spurred similar videos in other countries.

Cuming served as co-chair of the Working Party on Sexual Misconduct in Surgery. In 2023, Cuming co-authored the report "Breaking the Silence: Addressing Sexual Misconduct in Healthcare". The accompanying research, published in the British Journal of Surgery, found that 63% of female surgeons reported experiencing sexual harassment from colleagues and 30% reported sexual assault.

Cuming served as Chair of the Women in Surgery Forum at the Royal College of Surgeons of England from her election in 2021 until 2024.

Cuming is also the President of the International Anal Neoplasia Society.

== Awards ==
In 2025, she received a National Clinical Impact Award.

== Publications ==
- Newlands, Carrie; Dhariwal, Daljit; Cuming, Tamzin; Joubert, Tyla; Jackson, Philippa (September 2025). "Breaking the silence on sexual misconduct in surgery: two years on". The Bulletin of the Royal College of Surgeons of England. 107 (6). Royal College of Surgeons: 284–286. doi:10.1308/rcsbull.2025.103. ISSN 1473-6357.
- Cuming, Tamzin (2025). "The Bright Fabric of Life". Bulletin of the Royal College of Surgeons of England. 107 (2): 61. doi:10.1308/rcsbull.2025.34.
- Newlands, Carrie; Jackson, Philippa; Cuming, Tamzin (2023). Breaking the Silence: Addressing Sexual Misconduct in Healthcare (PDF) (Report). Working Party on Sexual Misconduct in Surgery.
- Cuming, Tamzin (11 September 2023). "This is a "MeToo" moment for those working in surgery". The Times.
- Cuming, Tamzin (2022). "Interview: Surviving in Scrubs Founders". Bulletin of the Royal College of Surgeons of England. 104 (8): 411–412. doi:10.1308/rcsbull.2022.153.
