= American Cosmetic Association =

- Industry: Medicine; Surgery; Nonprofit
- Founded: 2017
- Headquarters: Harrisburg, PA, USA
- Website: www.cosmeticassociation.org

American Cosmetic Association (ACA) is an American plastic surgery, cosmetic dentistry, aesthetic medicine and cosmetic dermatology specialty organization.

== History ==
Founded in 2017. The association is composed of surgeons, dentists, physicians and scientists who specialize in and conduct research on aesthetic procedures and plastic surgery.

== Recognition ==
ACA has been recognized by CDC for their diabetes prevention program that helps pre-diabetic individuals to reduce the risk of diabetes. The program works in conjunction with other healthy lifestyle programs aimed at improving health and appearance.

== Events ==
ACA launched "Cosmetic & Plastic Surgery Awareness Day", an event which increases awareness about cosmetic and plastic surgery procedures, their risks and benefits.

== See also ==
- American Board of Plastic Surgery
- American Society of Plastic Surgeons
