= Garki Hospital =

Geography
- Location: Area 8 Tafawa Balewa Rd, Abuja, Nigeria
- Coordinates: 9.0336°N 7.4847°E

Organisation
- Type: Specialist, General
- Patron: Federal Capital Territory Administration (FCTA)

Services
- Emergency department: Yes

Links
- Website: https://garkihospital.com/
- Lists: Hospitals in Nigeria

Garki Hospital is a 100-bed hospital in Abuja, Nigeria, is owned by the Federal Capital Territory Administration (FCTA), and is one of a few hospitals in the country that carry out renal transplants.

== Ownership ==
Garki Hospital Abuja is owned by the Federal Capital Territory Administration (FCTA). It was closed in 2001 for full renovation. In March 2007, a concession agreement for the management and operation of the new Garki Hospital Abuja was signed between FCTA and Nisa Premier Hospital, after a competitive bidding process.

== Specializations ==
Garki Hospital also runs residency programs in Obstetrics, Gynecology, Family Medicine and Pediatrics and is among private hospitals in the country accredited by the West African College of Physicians (WACP) and West African College of Surgeons (WACS) to run postgraduate medical training in these specialties. In December 2023, they were recommended for re-accreditation of the Pediatrics residency program, one of the few departments to run a 24-hour clinic for children in the Federal Capital Territory, Abuja.

The current medical director of the hospital is Dr Adamu Onu, a consultant Family Physician with other notable consultants like Professor Umar Shehu, Dr Diekola Utele (Paediatrics), Dr Kelechi Onyemkpa (Paediatrics), Dr Kenneth Ityo, Professor Titus Ibekwe (Otolaryngology) among others.

Due to the recent need and clamour for welfare improvement, the hospital in 2023, took bold steps to improve working conditions for staff.

== History ==
In 2001, Garki General Hospital was closed for a full-scale renovation. Over the next six years, the facility remained non-operational while undergoing rehabilitation.

In March 2007, the Federal Capital Territory Administration (FCTA) implemented its newly developed Public–Private Partnership (PPP) policy in healthcare, selecting Garki Hospital for a pilot program. After a competitive bidding process, Nisa Premier Hospital won the concession to manage and operate the renewed facility. Since it the hospitals reopening it has remained operational 24/7 with zero layoffs even amongst the COVID-19 pandemic.

In 2013, surgeons Nadey Hakim and Elijah Miner successfully performed the first kidney transplant at the hospital.

Following a study completed on 5 December 2017 comparing data between the then current date and the remodelling in 2007 found that the model of PPP was effective and had a positive correlation with innovative. This same month on the 31st it was declared that the hospital remitted approximately ₦200 million to the FCTA (₦20 million annually, plus bonuses and profit-sharing). The hospital also invested around ₦4.6 billion in modern medical equipment and planned an additional ₦10 billion investment over the next 30 years.

In October 2019, the Garki Hospital became the first hospital in sub-Saharan Africa to carry out Sleeve Gastrectomy.

In 2022 the Nigerian Medical Association (NMA) blocked the Federal Capital Territory Administration (FCTA)'s motion to terminate their longstanding PPP model of ownership with the NMA rejecting it on the grounds that the attempted termination was "abrupt". The attempted removal of the PPP ownership came as a shock to the staff who on 1 April 2022 were told to vacate the premises, this message came mere months after being praised by then secretariat of the Federal Capital Territory Administration (FCTA), Hon. Lukman Dabiri who described the hospital as a "good model and an epitome of a successful PPP project in the FCT" As well as receiving further praise by an advocacy group under the auspices of Abuja Grassroots Advocacy Projects (AGAP) who praised the model for having worked out perfectly and that "so many people have benefited from improved health services" whilst receiving further praise for remaining operational during a doctor's strike.
