= Grosvenor Place =

Street in Belgravia, London

Coordinates: 51°30′02″N 0°08′59″W

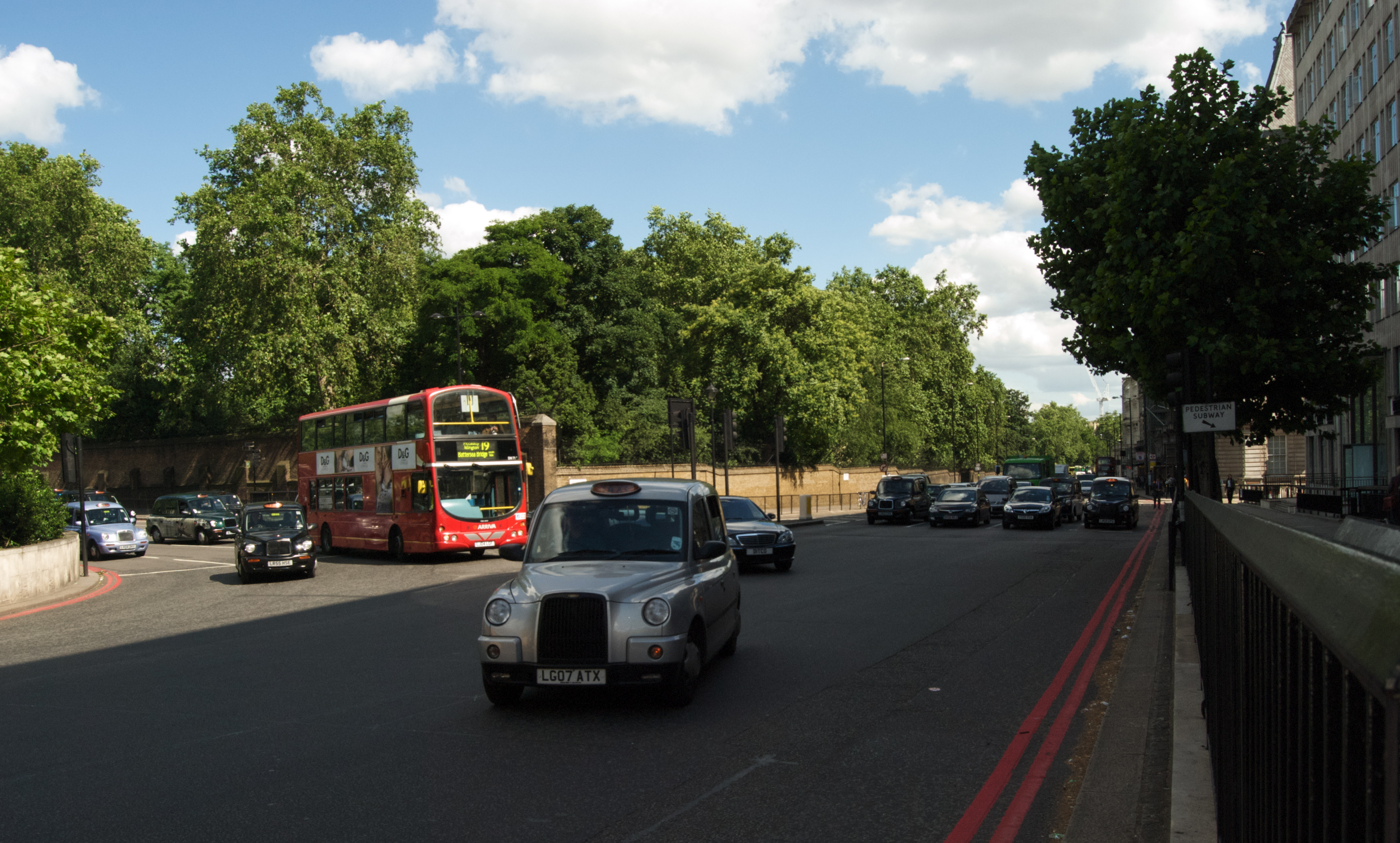
Grosvenor Place

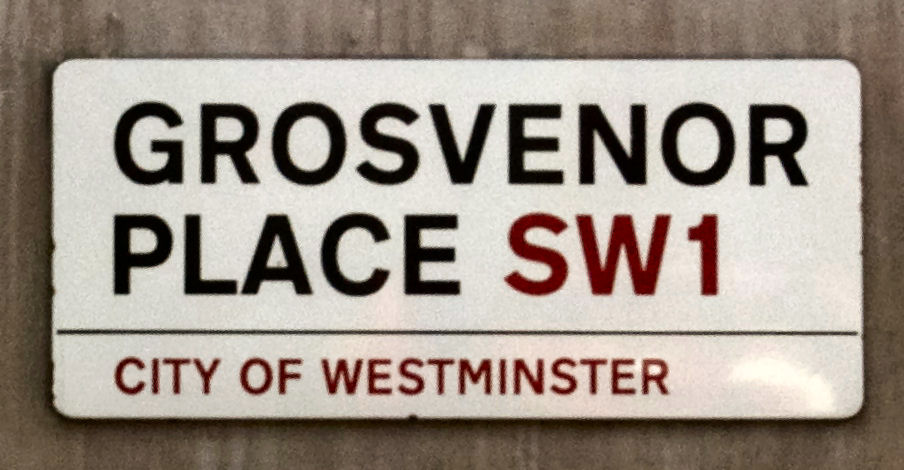
Grosvenor Place street sign

Grosvenor Place is a street in Belgravia, London, running from Hyde Park Corner down the west side of Buckingham Palace gardens, and joining Lower Grosvenor Place where there are some cafes and restaurants. It joins Grosvenor Gardens to the south, which links it to Victoria railway station. At No. 17 is the Embassy of the Republic of Ireland.

Cleveland Clinic London, the second-largest of 19 private hospitals in the capital, is at no.33.

== Notable residents ==
- Henry Campbell-Bannerman, Prime Minister, No.6
- Edward Guinness, 1st Earl of Iveagh
- David Rowlands (surgeon), No. 28
- Annie Henrietta Yorke, No. 2
