= Hand transplantation =

Surgical procedure to transplant a hand from one human to another

Hand transplantation, or simply hand transplant, is a surgical procedure to transplant a hand from one human to another. The donor hand, usually from a brain-dead donor, is transplanted to a recipient amputee. Most hand transplants to date have been performed on below-elbow amputees, although above-elbow transplants are gaining popularity. This was the first of a new category of transplants in which multiple organs are transplanted as a single functional unit, now termed "vascularized composite allotransplantation" (VCA).

The operation is extensive, and typically lasts from 8 to 12 hours. In comparison, a typical heart transplant operation lasts 6 to 8 hours. Surgeons usually connect the bones first, followed by tendons, arteries, nerves, veins, and skin.

== Use of immunosuppressive drugs afterward ==
For a hand transplant to succeed, the recipient is required to take immunosuppressive drugs, as in other organ transplants such as kidney or liver, to minimize rejection, or risk destruction of the hand by the recipient's natural immune system. These drugs risk weakening the recipient's immune system, which may increase the risk of infections and some cancers. Many recent advances in solid organ transplantation have made these medications more tolerable.

A period of extensive hand therapy/rehabilitation after transplantation helps the recipient gain function of the transplanted hand. Compliance with immunosuppressive medications and intensive physical therapy after hand transplants is associated with significant success in regaining the function of the new hands and/or arms.

== History ==
A hand transplant was performed in Ecuador in 1964, but the patient experienced transplant rejection after only two weeks due to the primitive nature of the immune-suppressing medications at that time.

=== 23 September 1998 hand transplant ===
The first short-term success in human hand transplant surgery occurred with Clint Hallam, from New Zealand. Hallam lost his hand in an accident while in prison. The operation was performed on 23 September 1998, in Lyon, France, by a team assembled from different countries around the world led by French Professor Jean-Michel Dubernard, including Professor Nadey Hakim, from the UK.

A microsurgeon on the team, Earl Owen from Australia, was privy to the detailed basic research, much of it unpublished, that had been carefully gathered by the team in Louisville. After the operation, Hallam was not comfortable with the idea of his transplanted hand and failed to follow the prescribed post-operative drug and physiotherapy regime. The case became an example of the necessity of a fully committed team of caregivers, including psychologists, who can correctly select and prepare the potential transplant recipients for the lengthy and difficult recovery, and for the modest functional restoration of a transplanted hand.

Hallam's transplanted hand was removed at his request by the transplant surgeon Nadey Hakim on 2 February 2001, following another episode of rejection that was, at least in part, caused by his stopping the anti-rejection medication.

=== Other hand transplantation surgeries ===
The first hand transplant to achieve prolonged success was directed by a team of Kleinert Kutz Hand Care surgeons including Warren C. Breidenbach, Tsu-Min Tsai, Luis Scheker, Steven McCabe, Amitava Gupta, Russell Shatford, William O'Neill, Martin Favetto and Michael Moskal in cooperation with the Christine M. Kleinert Institute, Jewish Hospital and the University of Louisville in Louisville, Kentucky. The procedure was performed on New Jersey native Matthew Scott on January 14, 1999. Scott had lost his hand in a fireworks accident at age 24. Later that year, the Philadelphia Phillies baseball team asked him to throw the ceremonial first pitch. The Louisville group went on to perform the first five hand transplants in the United States, and had performed 12 hand transplants in ten recipients as of 2016.

In contrast to the earlier attempts at hand transplantation, the Louisville group had performed extensive basic science research and feasibility studies for many years before their first clinical procedure (for example, Shirbacheh et al., 1998). There was also considerable transparency and institutional review board oversight involved in the screening and selection of prospective patients.

In March 2000, a team of surgeons at the University of Innsbruck in Austria began a series of three bilateral hand transplants over six years. The first was an Austrian police officer who had lost both hands attempting to defuse a bomb. He has completed an around-the-world solo motorcycle trip using his transplanted hands.

University of Louisville doctors also performed a successful hand transplant on Michigan native Jerry Fisher in February 2001, and Michigan resident David Savage in 2006.

On 14 January 2004, the team of Professor Jean-Michel Dubernard (Edouard-Herriot Hospital, France) declared a five-year-old double hand transplant a success. The lessons learned in this case, and in the 26 other hand transplants (6 double) which occurred between 2000 and 2005, encouraged other transplant operations of such organs as the face, abdominal wall, and larynx.

On 4 May 2009 Jeff Kepner, a 57-year-old Augusta, Georgia resident underwent the first double hand transplant in the United States at the University of Pittsburgh Medical Center by a team led by W. P. Andrew Lee, who also had been performing careful basic research on such transplants for many years. As of 2016, Kepner was still lacking function in his hands and stated he wished he could have them removed.

On 18 February 2010, the first woman in the United States underwent hand transplantation at Wilford Hall Medical Center in San Antonio, Texas. The procedure was performed by surgeons from the Hand Center of San Antonio and US Air Force.

On 22 June 2010, a Polish soldier received two new hands from a female donor, after losing them three years earlier while saving a young recruit from a bomb.

On 8 March 2011, 26-year-old Emily Fennell underwent an 18-hour surgery to attach a right hand. This was performed in the Ronald Reagan UCLA Medical Center.

On 12 March 2011 Linda Lu became the recipient of a hand transplant, performed at Emory University Hospital, from a donor, Leslie Sullivent.

In the fall of 2011, 28-year-old Lindsay Ess received a double hand transplant at the Hospital of the University of Pennsylvania in an 11 1/2 hour surgery.

On 27 December 2012, 51-year-old Mark Cahill received a right hand transplant at Leeds General Infirmary in the UK. The recipient's hand was removed during the same eight-hour operation, reportedly allowing very accurate restoration of nerve structures, believed to be an international first.

On 27 February 2013, 38-year-old Eskandar Moghaddami received hand transplant surgery by the 15th of Khordad Hospital plastic surgery team in Tehran, Iran.

On 13 January 2015, doctors at the Kochi-based Amrita Institute of Medical Sciences and Research Centre (AIMS) successfully conducted India's first hand transplant. A 30-year-old man, who had lost both his hands in a train accident, received the hands of a 24-year-old accident victim.

On 28 July 2015, doctors at the Children's Hospital of Philadelphia performed the first successful bilateral hand transplant on a child. At the age of 2, Zion Harvey lost his hands and feet to a life-threatening infection. Six years later, at age 8, he had both of his hands replaced in a double hand transplant.

On 2 August 2016, the reconstructive transplantation team at the Jawaharlal Institute of Postgraduate Medical Education and Research (JIPMER), Puducherry, performed the first intergender hand transplantation in India on a 16-year-old boy who had lost both his hands in an electrocution injury. The donor was a 54-year-old woman who was brain dead following a road traffic accident.

On 26 October 2016, the director of hand transplantation at UCLA, Dr. Kodi Azari, and his team, performed a hand transplant on 51-year-old entertainment executive from Los Angeles, Jonathan Koch at Ronald Reagan UCLA Medical Center. Koch underwent a 17-hour procedure to replace his left hand, which he lost to a mysterious, life-threatening illness that struck him in January 2015. On June 23, 2015, Koch had the amputation surgery, also performed by Azari, which was designed to prep him to receive a transplanted limb. This included severing the left hand closer to the wrist than the elbow. Azari kept all the nerves and tendons long and extended, which would give him plenty to work with later. He sutured them together and attached them to the stump of bone to keep them from retracting. This is the first known hand transplant case in which the hand was amputated in preparation for a hand transplant, as opposed to previous hand transplant patients who have undergone typical amputation surgeries. Azari's theory about prepping the hand for a transplant during the initial amputation surgery was later supported by Koch when he was able to move his thumb only two hours after he woke up from the 17-hour transplant surgery, and was able to move his entire hand only two days after surgery.

On 15 January 2021, Icelander Guðmundur Felix Grétarsson underwent the first double-arm and double-shoulder transplant from doctors in France. The transplant was deemed successful.

== Long-term functionality ==
The long-term functionality varies patient to patient, and is affected by several factors, including level of amputation and transplant and participation in occupational therapy after surgery.

== Survival rates ==
Although the one-year survival rate of transplanted hands has been excellent at institutions that are fully committed to the procedure, the number of hand transplants performed after 2008 has been small due to drug-related side effects, uncertain long-term outcome, and the high costs of surgery, rehabilitation and immunosuppression.

== Programs ==
=== United States ===
The Johns Hopkins University School of Medicine Hand and Arm Transplant Program was approved by the Johns Hopkins Medicine Institutional Review Board in July 2011. This is one of only two programs in the United States approved to perform hand/arm transplants using an immunomodulatory protocol, which enables patients to take one drug (instead of three) after the transplant to maintain the hand or arm. The program is funded by the US Army Medical Research and Materiel Command (MRMC) Armed Forces Institute of Regenerative Medicine (AFIRM) to transplant up to six Wounded Warriors or civilians who have a hand or arm amputation on one or both sides.

The Southern Illinois University School of Medicine Hand Transplant Program is located in Springfield, Illinois. The program was officially launched in January 2014 after receiving IRB approval and grant funding to transplant five patients, unilateral or bilateral, at minimal cost to the patients.

The UCLA Hand Transplant Program, located in Los Angeles, California, was launched on July 28, 2010. At the time, it was the only one on the West Coast and one of only four in the country.

=== United Kingdom ===
In 2016, it was announced that NHS patients in England were to become some of the first in the world to benefit from publicly funded pioneering hand and upper arm transplants delivered by a specialist team at Leeds General Infirmary.

== See also ==
- Head transplant
- Heart transplant
- Kidney transplant
- Meniscus transplant
