= American Society for Surgery of the Hand =

American medical specialty society

- Abbreviation: ASSH
- Formation: January 1946; 80 years ago
- Founder: Sterling Bunnell
- Type: Medical specialty society
- Headquarters: United States
- Members: Worldwide
- Affiliations: American Academy of Orthopaedic Surgeons (historically)

The American Society for Surgery of the Hand (ASSH) was founded in 1946 to facilitate the exchange of information related to problems of the hand. It is the oldest and largest medical specialty society in the United States devoted to the care of the hand.

Hand surgery as a specialty grew out of the treatment of the hand injuries that occurred during World War II. Sterling Bunnell, MD, founder and first president of the ASSH, set up nine regional hand centers at U.S. Army bases throughout the United States during the 1940s. As World War II drew to a close, Bunnell suggested forming an organization to continue to foster interest in hand care. In January 1946, he and 34 hand surgeons, many of whom had worked in the Army hospitals, met immediately preceding the annual meeting of the American Academy of Orthopaedic Surgeons (AAOS). The group continued to meet in conjunction with the AAOS annual meeting until 1987, when it held its first stand-alone annual meeting.

ASSH offers four types of membership: Active, Candidate, International, and Affiliate.

Active members are physicians who reside in the United States or Canada, and are certified by the American Board of Orthopaedic Surgery (ABOS), the American Osteopathic Board of Orthopedic Surgery (AOBOS), the American Board of Plastic Surgery (ABPS), the American Board of Surgery (ABGS) or by the Royal College of Physicians and Surgeons of Canada. All American-based hand surgeons seeking admission to Active Membership within ASSH are required to hold a Certificate of Added Qualifications in Hand Surgery, which is jointly administered by the three American boards. To maintain membership within ASSH, Active Members must attend an ASSH annual meeting at least once every three years.

Candidate members are qualified surgeons working in the United States who are interested in hand surgery and may eventually apply for full membership.

International members are qualified hand surgeons practicing medicine outside of the United States.

Affiliate members are allied healthcare professionals (e.g., hand therapists; occupational therapists; physical therapists; physician assistants; nurse practitioners; registered nurses) specializing in care of the hand and upper extremity.
