= King Fahad Hospital Jeddah =

King Fahad Hospital- Jeddah مستشفى الملك فهد بجدة

Geography
- Location: Jeddah, Makkah Region, Saudi Arabia
- Coordinates: 21.543366°N 39.166668°E

Organisation
- Type: General

Services
- Standards: JCI / CAP / CBAHI / IAEA / ASHI / AACME
- Emergency department: Yes

History
- Founded: 1980

Links
- Website: https://www.kfhj.med.sa/
- Lists: Hospitals in Saudi Arabia

King Fahad Hospital-Jeddah (King Fahd Hospital in Jeddah) (KFHJ) is a hospital in the Western region of Saudi Arabia.

== History ==
The hospital was opened in 1980 in the era of the Custodian of the Two Holy Mosques King Fahd bin Abdulaziz. The hospital in Jeddah is one of five hospitals of the same name in other areas of the Kingdom. The King Fahd Hospital in Jeddah considered as a landmark medically, it is the largest Ministry of Health hospital in the region. It has a number of specialized centres and departments, including centres for heart, nose, ear and throat, kidney, as well as a dental center and a center for laparoscopy surgery, and can practice nuclear medicine in its Diagnostic Radiology Department.
