= Transplantation Proceedings =

- Discipline: Transplantation medicine
- Language: English
- Edited by: Barry D. Kahan

Publication details
- History: 1969-present
- Publisher: Elsevier
- Frequency: 10/year
- Impact factor: 1.066 (2020)

Standard abbreviations
- ISO 4: Transplant. Proc.

Indexing
- CODEN: TRPPA8
- ISSN: 0041-1345 (print); 1873-2623 (web)
- OCLC no.: 01767705

Links
- Journal homepage; Online access; Online access

Transplantation Proceedings is a peer-reviewed medical journal covering the field of organ transplantation. It is the official publication of 27 international societies in this field.
