= Ajman Hotel =

- Ajman Hotel
- Interactive map of the Ajman Hotel area

General information
- Location: Ajman, United Arab Emirates
- Coordinates: 25.423032°N 55.442333°E
- Opening: 13 October 1997
- Owner: Host Corp.
- Management: Marriott

Technical details
- Floor count: 7

Other information
- Number of rooms: 166
- Number of suites: 14
- Number of restaurants: 4

Website
- https://www.marriott.com/

The Ajman Hotel is a luxury hotel located in Ajman, United Arab Emirates. It first opened its doors on October 13, 1997. The hotel is situated on the Ajman Beach, adjacent to Ajman marina. The property is positioned approximately 15.5 miles (25 km) away from the Dubai International Airport. Formerly managed by Kempinski Hotels, the Ajman Hotel is now operated by Blazon Hotels.

The hotel offers 166 rooms, including 14 suites. The hotel also has four restaurants, a night bar with live entertainment, a bowling club, and sports bar.

During the COVID-19 pandemic, the hotel implemented stringent hygiene measures throughout the property, including enhanced cleaning protocols and sanitization practices. The hotel also introduced restrictions on pool and restaurant usage to ensure physical distancing and operated at reduced occupancy levels, adhering to government guidelines and regulations.
