= Canadian model of occupational performance and engagement =

The Canadian Model of Occupational Performance and Engagement (CMOP-E) was developed by the Canadian Association of Occupational Therapists in 2007, and describes transactions and mutual influences between the dimensions of occupational performance. It is applied by the accompanying Occupational Performance Process Model, which describes the therapeutic process from a client’s perspective. The main model illustrates the relationship between person, occupation and environment. Spirituality is the fourth dimension, placed in the centre of the model to highlight its fundamental importance.

== History ==
The current CMOP-E results from developments in occupational therapy spanning thirty years. It was initially inspired by occupational performance frameworks proposed by the American Occupational Therapy Association and Reed and Sanderson. However, calls to develop a national quality assurance system lead to its forerunner in 1983 - 'Client-Centred Guidelines for the Practice of Occupational Therapy'. Refinements in the model are evident in further guideline statements and 'Enabling Occupation, A Canadian Occupational Therapy Perspective'. The model’s national development is a unique feature and so CMOP does not reflect the views of any one individual. However while some assume the model has no cultural bias and adaptation has been encouraged, little research has been conducted into the efficacy of its application in non western societies.

Apart from cultural relevance, Kielhofner identifies four characteristics of well developed models which CMOP possesses to varying degrees.

== Interdisciplinary Base ==
Client centered practice originally evolved in psychology. It combines with systems approach, environmental theory and research into 'flow' by Csikszentmihalyi to provide CMOP with a broad interdisciplinary base of knowledge. it involves 3 component - person, occupation, environmental.

== Theory regarding order, disorder and intervention ==
In CMOP-E, occupational order has six perspectives – physical rehabilitative, psycho-emotional, socio-adaptive, neurointegrative, developmental or environmental – in relation to the arbitrary performance areas of self care, leisure and productivity. Quality of function is assessed in terms of both performance and satisfaction. Disorder may occur in the dimensions of person, occupation or environment, or when the momentum of experience is lost due to unresolved issues. Intervention aims to improve transactions between person, occupation and environment, through the process of enablement rather than treatment. Enablement involves working with clients to facilitate autonomy, and does not focus primarily on performance components.

== Technology for application ==
The Canadian Occupational Performance Measure (COPM) is a semi structured interview developed to apply the model and is the only prescribed assessment. This allows freedom to choose other supporting assessments but also restrict the methods of application for the model. Therapists have praised its client centred approach, relatively quick administration, role in promoting occupational therapy in multidisciplinary teams and compatibility with other assessment tools.

== Empirical Base ==
The majority of related research evidence pertains to the assessment tool rather than the model. Of this research, most has been in institutional settings, methodologies usually have medium to low levels of credibility, and may are attributed to the same therapists involved in the model's formulation. The model is said to be applicable to all ages and diagnoses groups but few studies have explored its practical application.
