= Tenodesis grasp =

Reflex of the human hand

Tenodesis grasp and release is an orthopedic observation of a passive hand grasp and release mechanism, affected by wrist extension or flexion, respectively. It is caused by the manner of attachment of the finger tendons to the bones and the passive tension created by two-joint muscles used to produce a functional movement or task (tenodesis). Moving the wrist in extension or flexion will cause the fingers to curl or grip when the wrist is extended, and to straighten or release when the wrist is flexed.

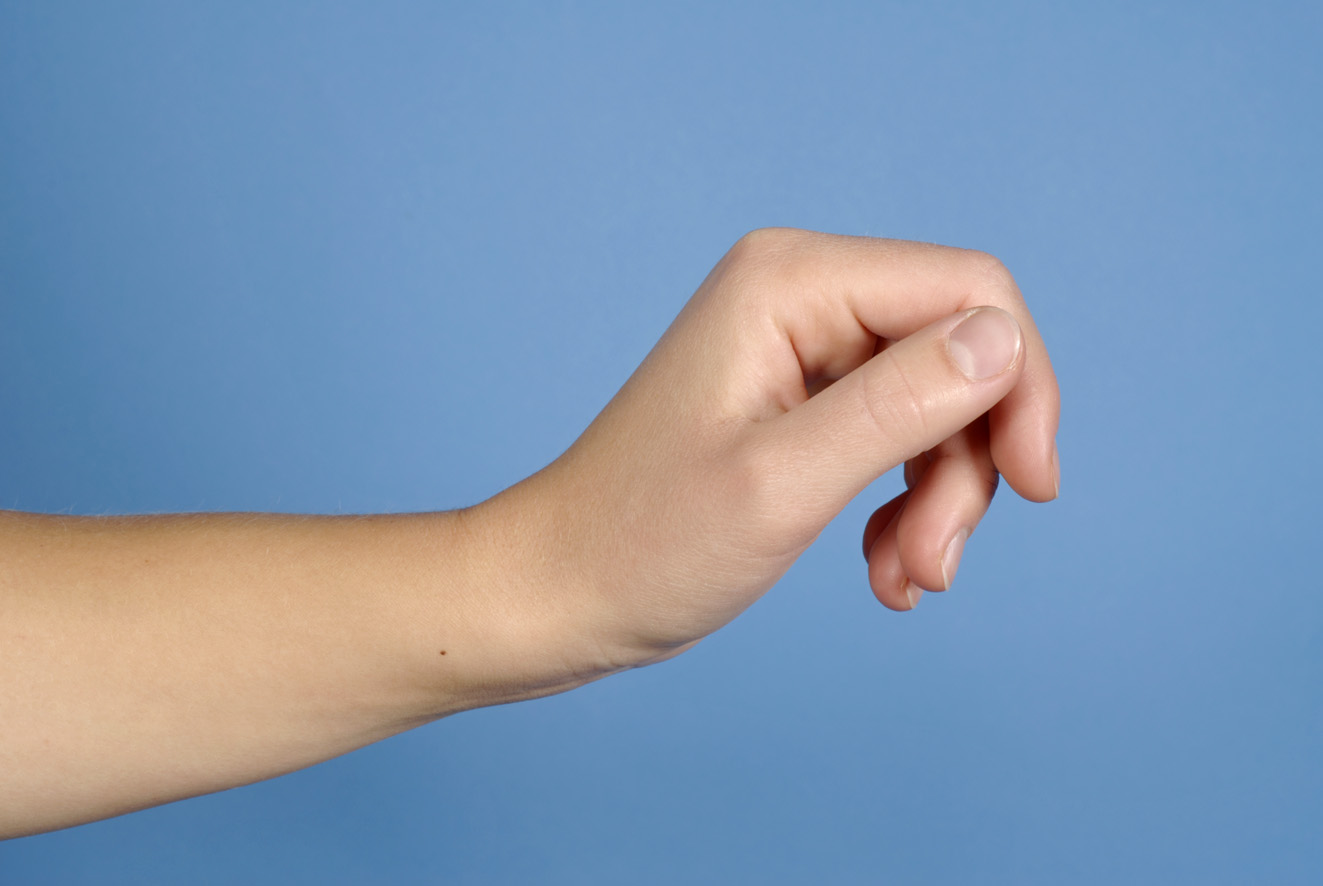
Wrist extension tenodesis effect

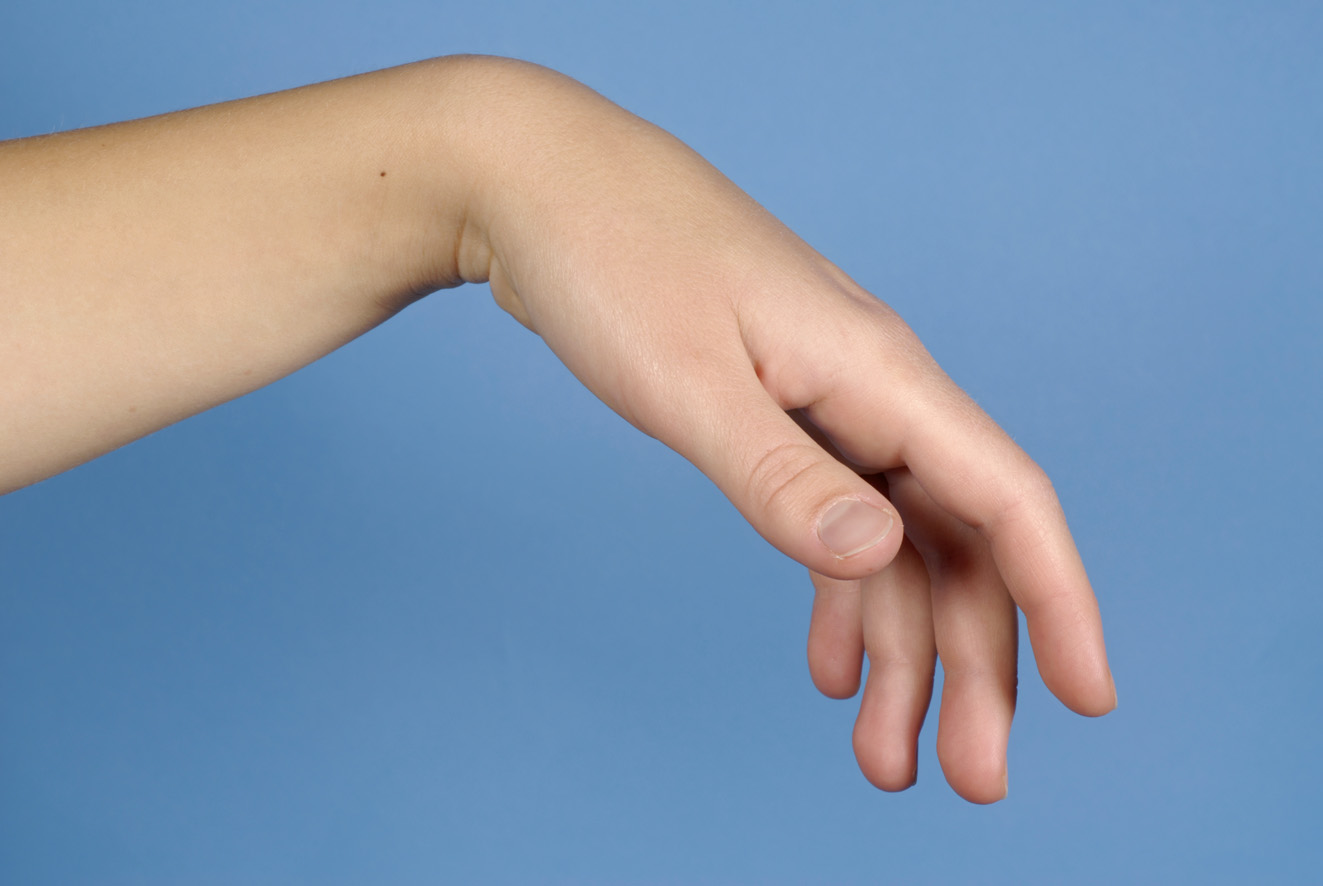
Wrist flexion tenodesis effect

The tenodesis grip and release mechanism is used in occupational therapy, physical therapy and rehabilitation of fine motor impairment, typically various levels of spinal paralysis, and in kinesiology and sports mechanics that are concerned with efficient grasp and release mechanics. Wrist extension is noted for bat grip in baseball. Wrist extension is also noted in the form of grip used in most schools of Japanese swordsmanship or kenjutsu.

== Rehabilitation ==
=== Overview ===
This particular function serves to enhance gripping capabilities for individuals with tetraplegia exhibiting wrist extension against gravity but lacking active finger functionality (C6 Motor Level). The active wrist extension, when initiated, draws the fingers and thumb into a flexed position passively. Acquiring tenodesis function is crucial for enabling task execution, as it allows for the passive holding of objects between the thumb and index finger or within the palm. People with tetraplegia devise adaptive approaches to optimize the utility of their hands. Many individuals create alternative techniques to carry out their daily activities. One such strategy involves leveraging the impact of gravity to enhance grasping capabilities. This adjustment is inherent in the tenodesis grasp, where the hand is often opened through wrist flexion assisted by gravity, reflecting a reliance on this natural force.

=== Kinematic Characteristics and Muscles Involved ===
The tenodesis grasp entails extending the wrist (specifically the extensor carpi radialis longus and brevis), leading to two distinct types of grips: a passive whole hand grasp attributed to the shortening of finger flexors and a passive lateral grip resulting from the shortening of the flexor pollicis longus.

=== Optimizing Tenodesis Grasp ===
There are a number of ways that a patient in a rehabilitation or healthcare setting can optimize their tenodesis Grasp to boost their independence after a spinal cord injury. A physical therapy or occupational therapy professional may guide the patient in the following ways:

- Prescribe the use of an orthotic splint to help guide the patient through grasp and release movements.
- Move the wrist through the entire range of motion
- Stretching fingers with the wrist flexed

=== Clinical Relevance ===
The use of an effective tenodesis grasp after a spinal cord injury can have a substantial impact on the activities of daily living for a patient after suffering a spinal cord injury. The majority of individuals with tetraplegia opt against undergoing surgical reconstruction for hand function, relying instead on the inherent passive properties of their musculoskeletal system to carry out functional tasks.
