= Hand surgery =

Medical specialty for the upper limb

Hand Surgeon
Occupation
- Names: Physician; Surgeon
- Occupation type: Specialty
- Activity sectors: Medicine, Surgery

Description
- Education required: Doctor of Medicine (M.D.); Doctor of Osteopathic medicine (D.O.); Bachelor of Medicine, Bachelor of Surgery (M.B.B.S.); Bachelor of Medicine, Bachelor of Surgery (MBChB)
- Fields of employment: Hospitals, Clinics

Hand surgery deals with both surgical and non-surgical treatment of conditions and problems that may take place in the hand or upper extremity (commonly from the tip of the hand to the shoulder) including injury and infection. Hand surgery may be practiced by post graduates of orthopedic surgery and plastic surgery and MCh Hand surgery.

Plastic surgeons and orthopedic surgeons receive significant training in hand surgery during their residency training. Also, some graduates do an additional one-year hand fellowship. Board certified general, plastic, or orthopedics surgeons who have completed approved fellowship training in hand surgery and have met a number of other practice requirements are qualified to take the "Certificate of Added Qualifications in Surgery of the Hand" examination, formerly known as the CAQSH, it is now known as the SOTH." Now super speciality training called MCh Hand Surgery required to be a qualified hand surgeon. Regardless of their original field of training, once candidates have completed an approved fellowship in hand surgery, all hand surgeons have received training in treating all injuries both to the bones and soft tissues of the hand and upper extremity. Among those without additional hand training, plastic surgeons have usually received training to handle traumatic hand and digit amputations that require a "replant" operation. Orthopedic surgeons are trained to reconstruct all aspects to salvage the appendage: tendons, muscle, bone. As well, orthopedic surgeons are trained to handle complex fractures of the hand and injuries to the carpal bones that alter the mechanics of the wrist.

== History ==
The historical context for the three qualifying fields is that both plastic surgery and orthopedic surgery are more recent branches off the general surgery main trunk. Modern hand surgery began in World War II as a military planning decision. US Army Surgeon General, Major General Norman T. Kirk, knew that hand injuries in World War I had poor outcomes in part because there was no formal system to deal with them. Kirk also knew that his civilian general surgical colleague Dr. Sterling Bunnell had a special interest and experience in hand reconstruction. Kirk tapped Bunnell to train military surgeons in the management of hand injuries to treat the war casualties, and at that time hand surgery became a formal specialty.

Orthopedic surgeons continued to develop special techniques to manage small bones, as found in the wrist and hand. Pioneering plastic surgeons developed microsurgical techniques for repairing the small nerves and arteries of the hand. Surgeons from all three specialties have contributed to the development of techniques for repairing tendons and managing a broad range of acute and chronic hand injuries. Hand surgery incorporates techniques from orthopedics, plastic surgery, general surgery, neurosurgery, vascular and microvascular surgery and psychiatry. A recent advance is the progression to 'wide awake hand surgery.'

In a few countries such as Sweden, Finland and Singapore, hand surgery is recognized as a clinical specialty in its own right, with a formal four to six years hand surgery resident training program. Hand surgeons going through these programs are trained in all aspects of hand surgery, combining and mastering all the skills traditionally associated with "Orthopedic hand surgeons" and "Plastic hand surgeons" to become equally adept at handling tendon, ligament and bone injuries as well as microsurgical reconstruction such as reattachment of severed parts or free tissue transfers and transplants.

== Scope of field ==
Hand surgeons perform a wide variety of operations such as fracture repairs, releases, transfer and repairs of tendons and reconstruction of injuries, rheumatoid deformities and congenital defects. They also perform microsurgical reattachment of amputated digits and limbs, microsurgical reconstruction of soft tissues and bone, nerve reconstruction, and surgery to improve function in paralysed upper limbs. There are two medical societies that exist in the United States to provide continuing medical education to hand surgeons: the American Society for Surgery of the Hand and the American Association for Hand Surgery. In Britain, the medical society for hand surgeons is the: British Society for Surgery of the Hand (BSSH). In Europe, several societies are brought together by the Federation of European Societies for Surgery of the Hand (FESSH).

== Indications ==
The following conditions can be indications for hand surgery:

- Hand and Wrist injuries
- Tendon conditions e.g. trigger finger
- Nerve Compression Disorders e.g. Carpal tunnel syndrome, Cubital tunnel syndrome
- Carpometacarpal bossing
- Rheumatoid arthritis
- Dupuytren's contracture
- Congenital defects

== Complications ==
Some complications of hand surgery include:

- Infection - sometimes termed surgical site infection, infection is the most common and costly complication of surgery. This is equally true within the hand whereby the overall risk is ~5%.
- Bleeding is uncommon and the available evidence indicates that the risk of bleeding is not related to the use of oral antiplatelet or anticoagulants.
- Stiffness
- Contractures
- Complex Regional Pain Syndrome

== See also ==
- Tetraplegic upper limb surgery
