= Saudi Center for Organ Transplantation =

- المركز السعودي لزراعة الأعضاء
- Abbreviation: SCOT
- Founded at: Kingdom of Saudi Arabia
- Headquarters: Riyadh, Saudi Arabia
- Fields: Organ transplantation
- Director General: Talal Algoufi

The Saudi Center for Organ Transplantation (SCOT), was established in 1985 by the Government of Saudi Arabia. It was formerly known as the National Kidney Foundation (Saudi), until it was renamed in 1993, and is a centre for the transplantation of organs in the Kingdom of Saudi Arabia. Its Director General is Talal Algoufi.
