= Cleveland Clinic London =

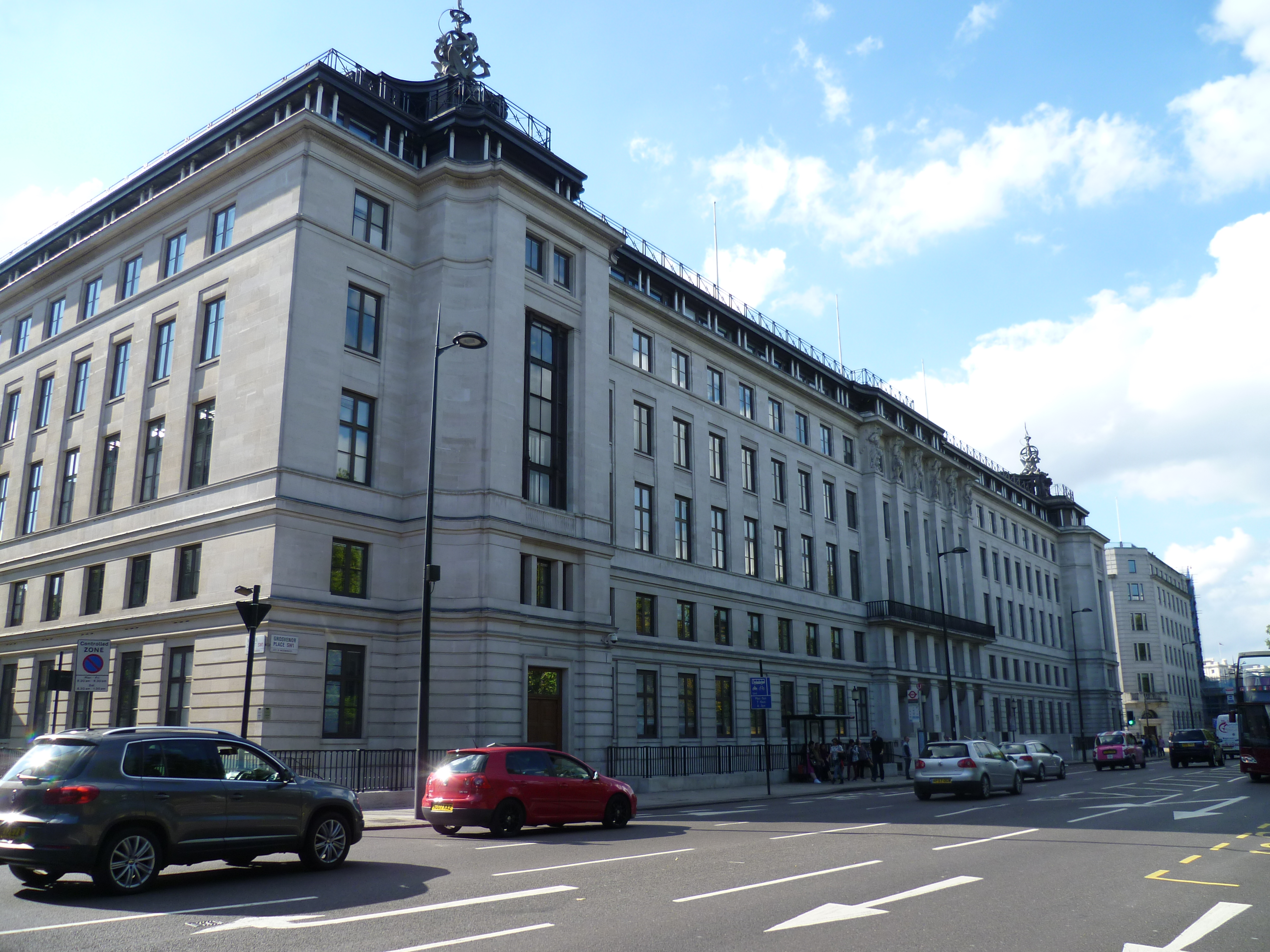
- 33 Grosvenor Place

- Location in Westminster

Geography
- Coordinates: 51.5002°N 0.1485°W

Links
- Website: Official website

Cleveland Clinic London is a 184-bed private hospital owned by the US operator Cleveland Clinic. Opened in March 2022, it is the second-largest of the nineteen private hospitals in the capital, after the Wellington Hospital in St John's Wood. It has partnered with the King Edward VII's Hospital, another private hospital in London.

Cleveland Clinic London is at 33 Grosvenor Place, and overlooks the gardens of Buckingham Palace.

In addition to the hospital in Belgravia, the group has opened six-floor clinic in Marylebone and a 13,000-square-foot (1,200 m^{2}) facility in the City of London.
