= American Board of Plastic Surgery =

US medical organization

The American Board of Plastic Surgery is a medical organization established in 1938. It was organized as a subsidiary of the American Board of Surgery. It was given the status of a major specialty board in 1941. It is the one certifying body for plastic and reconstructive surgery recognised by the American Board of Medical Specialties.

== Overview ==
ABPS certification has the following requirements:

- Graduation from an accredited medical school
- Completion of either:
  - at least three years of general surgery residency training
  - or a complete residency in neurological surgery, orthopaedic surgery, otolaryngology, oral and maxillofacial surgery, or urology.
- Completion of plastic surgery residency training of at least two years
- Passing comprehensive oral and written exams

Renewal of certification: Diplomates who received ABPS certification in 1995 or after must be renewed by Maintenance of Certification (MOC) examination every 10 years. Diplomates who were Board Certified prior to 1995] are not required to renew by examination every 10 years. Board Certification certificates issued prior to 1995 have no expiration date.
