= Jadwiga =

- Pronunciation: Polish pronunciation: [jadˈviɡa]
- Gender: Feminine

Origin
- Origin: Old High German
- Region of origin: Poland

Other names
- Related names: Edvige, Edwige, Hadewijch, Hedda, Hédi, Hedvig, Hedviga, Hedvika, Hedwig, Hedwige, Hedy, Helvi, Heta, Iadviga, Iadvykha, Iga, Jadviha, Jadzia, Jadvyga, Jadwinia, Jadwisia, Jaga, Jagienka, Jagna, Jagoda, Jagusia, Yadviga, Yadviha

Jadwiga (Polish pronunciation: [jadˈviɡa]; diminutives: Jadzia [ˈjad͡ʑa], Iga) is a Polish feminine given name. It originated from the old Germanic feminine given name Hedwig (variants of which include Hedwiga), which is compounded from hadu ('battle') and wig ('fight').

== People with the given name Jadwiga ==
- Jadwiga (wife of Władysław Odonic) (died 1249), Duchess consort of Greater Poland
- Jadwiga of Kalisz (1266-1339), Polish queen
- Jadwiga of Poland (ca. 1373-74-1399), Polish monarch
- Jadwiga Abramson (1887-1944), Polish child psychologist
- Jadwiga Andrzejewska (1915-1977), Polish film and theater actress
- Jadwiga Apostoł (1913-1990), Polish writer, resistance fighter
- Jadwiga Barańska(1935-2024), Polish actress and screenwriter
- Jadwiga Chojnacka (1900-1992), Polish film actress
- Jadwiga Damse (born 1947), Polish Olympic luger
- Jadwiga Długoborska (1899-1944), Polish teacher, who rescued Jews in WWII
- Jadwiga Dobrzyńska (1898-1940), Polish architect
- Jadwiga Doering (born 1938), Polish Olympic sprint canoer
- Jadwiga Dudziec (1912-1944), Polish educator and member of the Polish Resistance during World War II
- Jadwiga Dzido (1918-1985), Polish resistance worker deported to the Ravensbrück concentration camp
- Jadwiga Dzieduszycka (1867-1941), Polish noblewoman
- Jadwiga Dziubińska (1874-1937), Polish politician
- Jadwiga Falkowska (1889-1944), Polish teacher, soldier, and scout leader
- Jadwiga Golcz (1866-1936), Polish photographer
- Jadwiga Grabowska-Hawrylak (1920-2018), Polish architect
- Jadwiga Harasowska (1904-1978), Polish publisher, journalist, and émigré activist
- Jadwiga Hładki (1904-1944), Polish artist
- Jadwiga Jagiellon (disambiguation), several Polish princesses of that name
- Jadwiga Jankowska-Cieślak (1951-2025), Polish film actress
- Jadwiga Jędrzejowska (1912-1980), Polish tennis player
- Jadwiga Klemensiewicz (1871-1963), Polish pharmacist
- Jadwiga Klimaj (1931-1998), Polish Olympic shot putter
- Jadwiga Kołdras (born 1959), Polish Olympic field hockey player
- Jadwiga Kotnowska (born 1957), Polish flautist
- Jadwiga Książek (1939-2019), Polish volleyball player
- Jadwiga Kuryluk (1912-1995), Polish film actress
- Jadwiga Lachowska (1892-after 1962), Polish operatic soprano and mezzo-soprano
- Jadwiga Lenartowicz Rylko (1910-2010), Polish physician and Nazi concentration camp survivor
- Jadwiga Lipińska (1932-2009), Polish Egyptologist
- Jadwiga Łopata, Polish organic farmer
- Jadwiga Łuszczewska (1834-1908), Polish poet, novelist and salonniére
- Jadwiga Łuszkowska (1616-1648), Polish noblewoman, known as the mistress of Polish king Ladislaus IV Vasa
- Jadwiga Ostrowska-Czubenko (born 1949), Polish chemist
- Jadwiga Piłsudska (1920-2014), Polish pilot who served in the Air Transport Auxiliary during the Second World War
- Jadwiga Rappé (1952-2025), Polish contralto
- Jadwiga Rutkowska (1934-2004), Polish Olympic volleyball player
- Jadwiga Sapieżyna (1806-1890), Polish noblewoman and philanthropist
- Jadwiga Sarnecka (1877 or 1883-1913), Polish composer and pianist
- Jadwiga Smosarska (1898-1971), Polish film actress
- Jadwiga Staniszkis (1942-2024), Polish sociologist and political scientist
- Jadwiga Szczawińska-Dawidowa (1864-1910), Polish teacher, school founder, writer and women's rights activist
- Jadwiga Szmidt (1889 – 1940), Polish-Russian physicist
- Jadwiga Szopieraj (1908-1975), Polish photographer
- Jadwiga Szoszler-Wilejto (born 1949), Polish Olympic archer
- Jadwiga Szubartowicz (1905-2017), Polish supercentenarian
- Jadwiga Tyszka (1954-2005), Polish-born actress and community activist
- Jadwiga Umińska (1900-1983), Polish painter
- Jadwiga Vuyk (1886-1950), Polish-Dutch art dealer and art historian
- Jadwiga Wajs (1912-1990), Polish Olympic discus thrower
- Jadwiga Wołoszyńska (1882-1951), Polish botanist
- Jadwiga Wysoczanská (1927-2021), Czech operatic soprano
- Jadwiga Zakrzewska (born 1950), Polish politician
- Jadwiga Złotorzycka (1926-2002), Polish entomologist
- Jadwiga Żylińska (1910-2009), Polish author

== People with the given name Jadzia ==
- Jadzia Axelrod (fl. from 2022), American comic book writer and illustrator

== Fictional characters ==
- Jadzia Dax, from Star Trek: Deep Space Nine

== See also ==
- Hedwig (disambiguation)
- Hadewijch
- Edwige
