= Stanisława Dowgiałłówna =

Polish pharmacist

Stanisława Dowgiałłówna (1865–1933) was a Polish pharmacist.

In 1894, she was one of the three first women (Jadwiga Klemensiewicz, Janina Kosmowska and Stanisława Dowgiałłówna) to be accepted as students at the Jagiellonian University, and thus the first female university students in Poland, where women had previously had studied abroad. When they graduated, they became the first women pharmacists to take their degree in Poland rather than Antonina Leśniewska, who took her degree abroad.
