= Our Lady of Šiluva =

Venerated Catholic icon

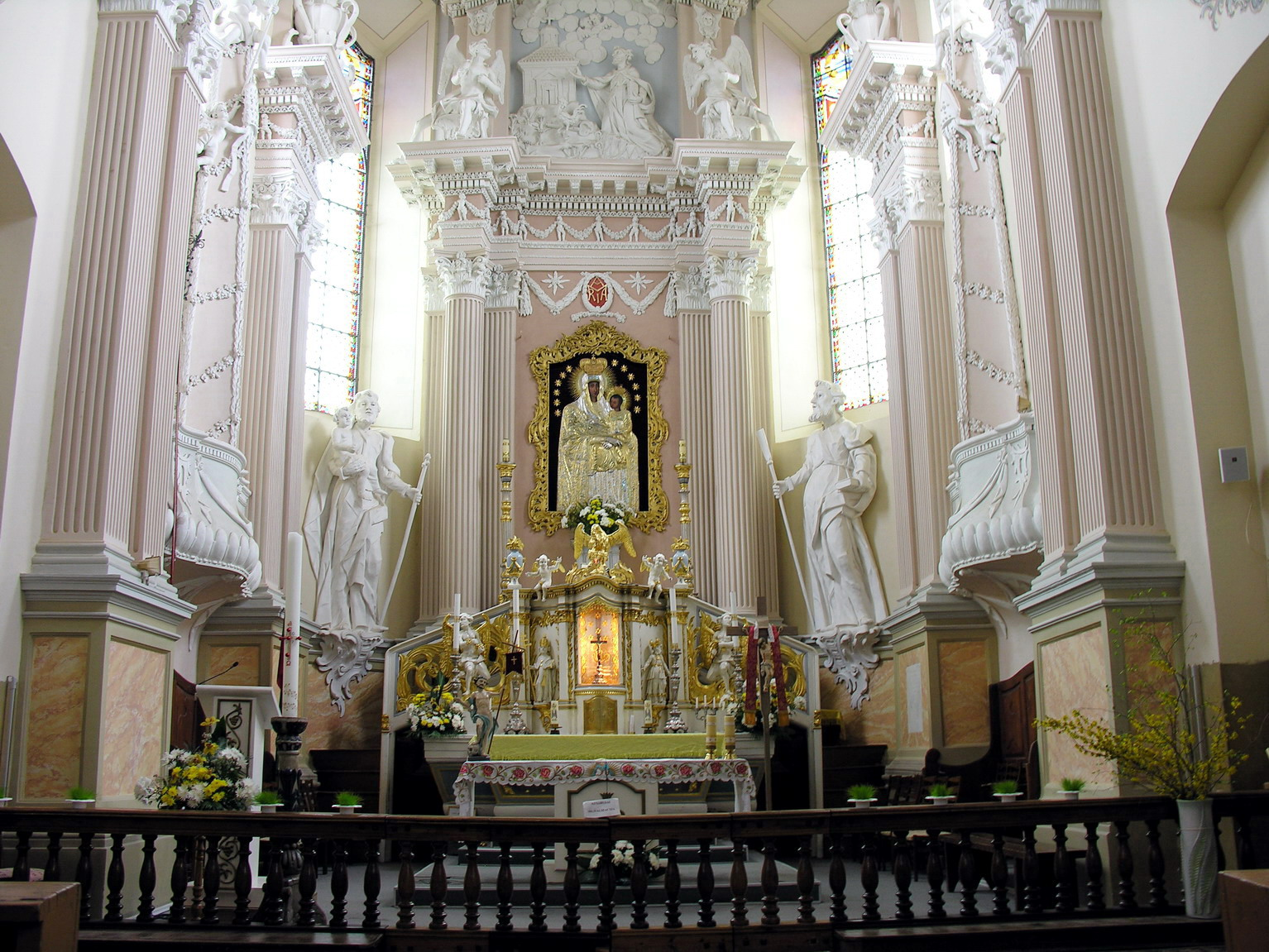
- Location: Lithuania

Our Lady of Šiluva (English: Our Lady of the Pine Woods) is a Roman Catholic image of the Blessed Virgin Mary venerated at the Basilica of the Nativity of the Blessed Virgin Mary, Šiluva, Lithuania. The patriotic icon is highly venerated in Lithuania and is often called "Lithuania's greatest treasure".

Pope Pius VI granted a canonical coronation to the venerated image on 8 September 1786. Pope John Paul II raised the shrine to the status of Minor Basilica via his pontifical decree Constat intra fines on 6 May 1988. The town of Šiluva is one of the most important pilgrimage sites in Lithuania with its ancient tradition of the Feast of the Nativity of the Blessed Virgin Mary, popularly called Šilinės, celebrated on 8 September.

== Background ==
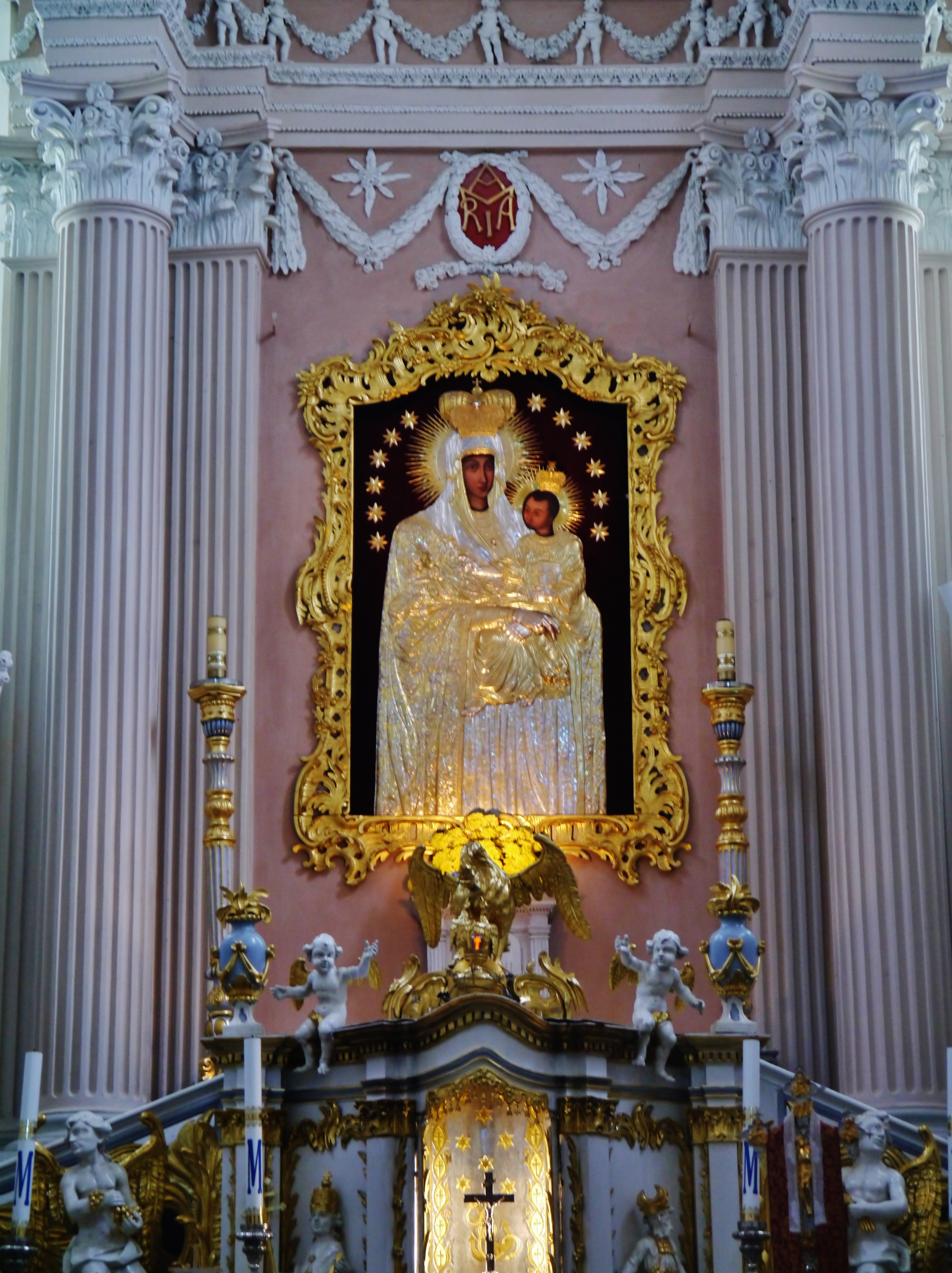
A closeup of the image above the high altar, with its canonical crowns.

Marian devotion at Šiluva goes back almost to the beginning of Christianity in Lithuania. Grand Duke Jogaila was baptized Catholic in 1387 when he married Jadwiga, Queen of Poland. Later, he and his successors worked to spread Christianity in their territory, which until then was pagan. They established the ecclesiastical hierarchy, built churches, and even personally taught catechism to their subjects.

== History ==
The first church in Šiluva was the initiative of a nobleman named Petras Gedgaudas, who worked in the service of Grand Duke Vytautas the Great. Gedgaudas in 1457 allocated land and other resources for a church to the Virgin Mary, which became the Church of the Nativity of the Blessed Virgin Mary and the Apostles Saints Peter and Bartholomew. Huge crowds of the faithful, even from neighbouring Protestant Prussia, would flock to this site for the indulgenced Feast of the Nativity of the Blessed Virgin Mary.

The icon is painted in the Hodegetria style, and is similar to the famous Roman icon, the Salus Populi Romani. According to legend, the miraculous icon was brought to Šiluva from Rome in 1457 as a gift to Gedgaudas. The new church gained fame as a Marian shrine.

By 1532, the population in the vicinity of Šiluva became predominantly Calvinist. In the following decades, many Catholic churches were confiscated and closed. Nevertheless, as long as the old church was open, pilgrims continued to attend the annual Feast of the Nativity of Mary, until the church was finally closed and eventually razed. In the 16th century, a Lutheran pastor complained about members of his flock travelling to Šiluva for the annual feast. Around the year 1569, the last remaining parish priest, Father John Holubka, hid all of the church’s surviving valuables and documents in an ironclad box, which he buried on the grounds of the ruined church.

Local Catholics subsequently attempted legal proceedings against the Calvinists, seeking to regain confiscated church property. The case was complicated by the Catholic ownership documents having been lost.

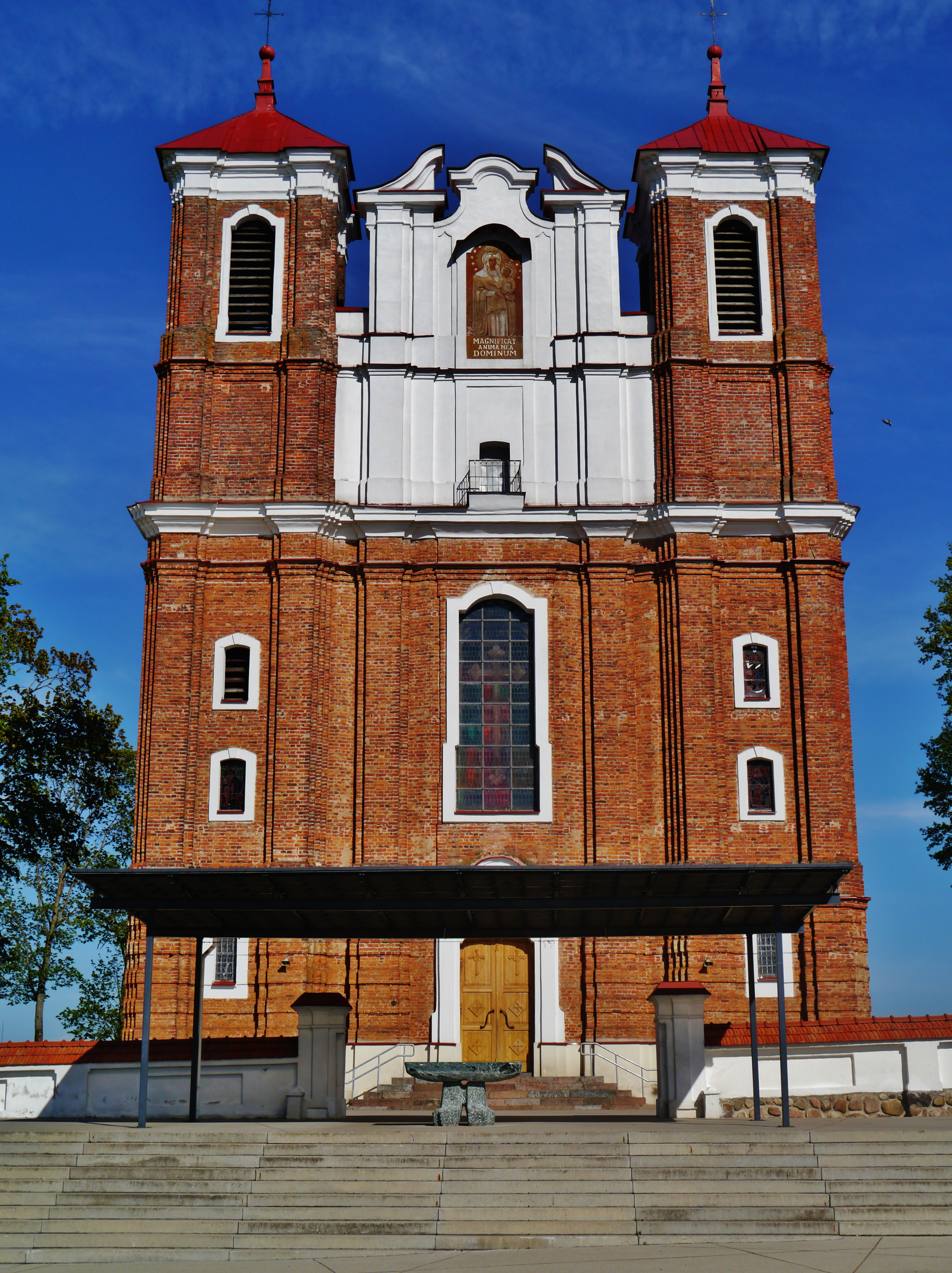
Basilica of the Nativity of the Blessed Virgin Mary in Šiluva

== Apparition ==
This issue was resolved in the summer of 1608 when a few children tending their sheep in a field some distance away from Šiluva reported seeing a beautiful woman holding a baby, at the very spot where the church had stood. She was weeping bitterly. The children returned the next day accompanied by many from the whole village including a Calvinist minister, and they saw her as well. When word spread, an old blind man who had assisted Holubka in burying the treasures of the original church recalled the place. After the apparition, the institutional documents of the Catholic Church were found, and in 1622 the case concerning the restitution of Catholic ownership was won.

A small wooden church, the Church of the Nativity of the Blessed Virgin Mary, was built on the site of the original church, but proved too small for the many pilgrims. A much larger church was built in 1641.

Pope Pius VI confirmed the authenticity of the apparition of Our Lady of Šiluva by papal decree on 17 August 1775.

The present-day Basilica of the Nativity of the Blessed Virgin Mary was consecrated in 1786. The building is one of the finest examples of late Baroque architecture in Lithuania. The interior, designed by Lithuanian artist, Thomas Podgaiskis, has been preserved without significant changes for over two centuries.

Prior to World War II, processions used to depart from every Lithuanian town, making the pilgrimage to Šiluva. The 13th day of each month is therefore known as “Mary’s Day”.

== Veneration ==
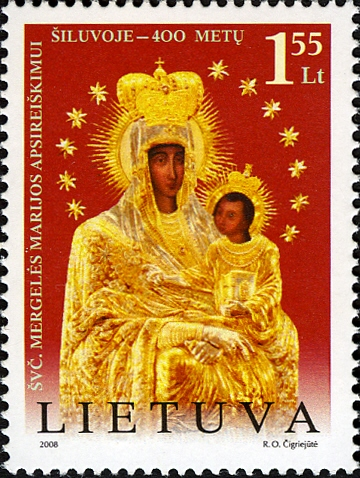
Lithuanian stamp depicting Our Lady of Šiluva, 2008

On 17 August 1775, Pope Pius VI promulgated papal decree to confirm the authenticity of Our Lady of Šiluva.

The Chapel of the Apparition, built in the Egyptian-Revival and Gothic styles, has the tallest steeple in Lithuania. Under the chapel altar is the rock where the children said the Virgin Mary stood, which pilgrims make a point to kiss.

For its devotion to Mary, Pope Pius XI called Lithuania Terra Mariana ("Land of Mary"). Pope Pius VI approved devotions to Our Lady of Šiluva and granted indulgences for these.

Pope John Paul II prayed at the shrine in 1993, two years after the Baltic nation regained independence from the former Soviet Union. Pope Benedict XVI in 2006 blessed new crowns of gold for the icon, and in 2008 he sent a papal legate to join in festivities for the four hundredth anniversary of the apparition.

=== In the United States ===
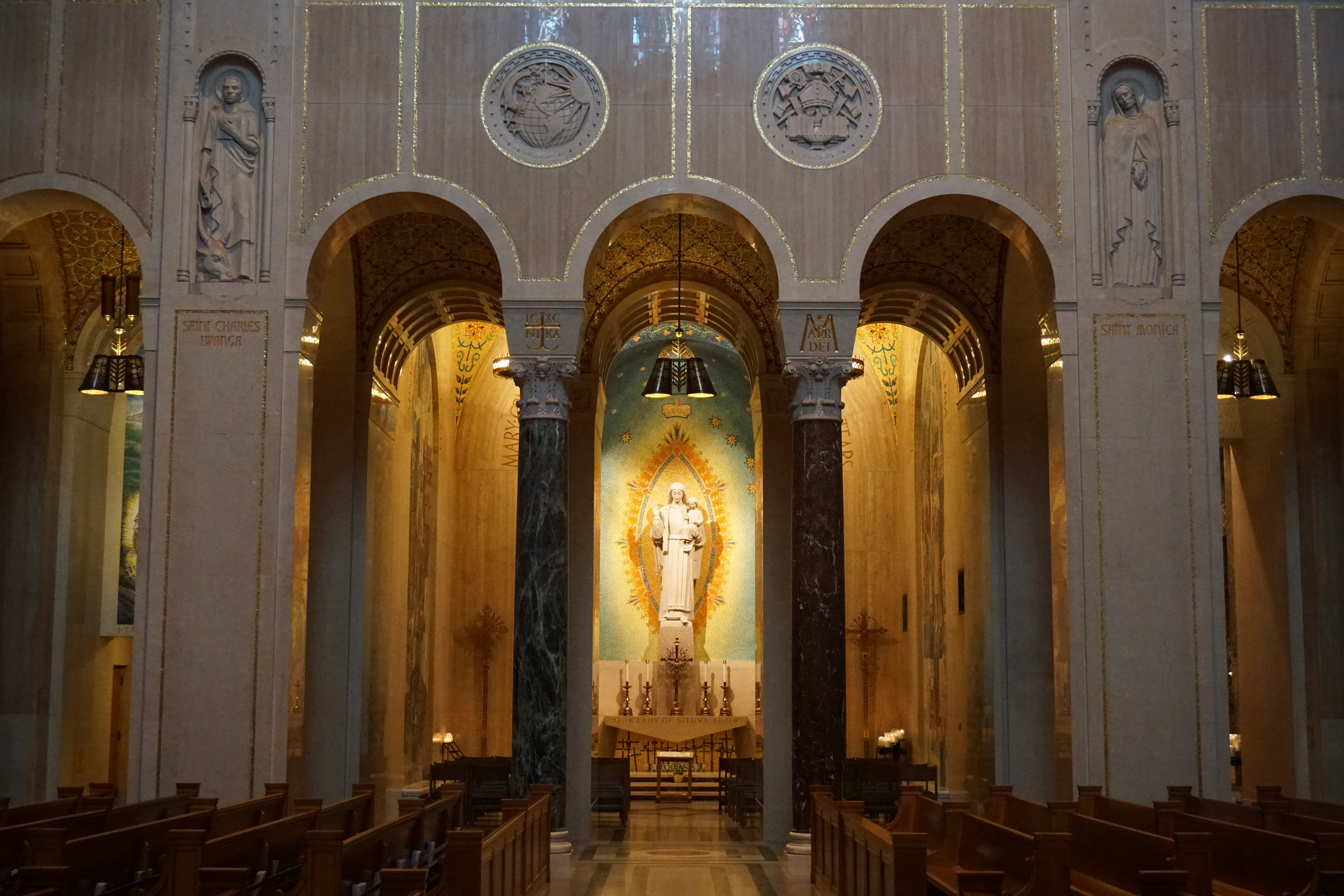
Our Lady of Šiluva Chapel in Washington, D.C.

In the United States, a chapel to Our Lady of Šiluva is located within the Basilica of the National Shrine of the Immaculate Conception in Washington, D.C. The Lithuanian émigré and refugee community in the United States, under the leadership of Bishop Vincent Brizgys, organized in 1963 for establishment of the Šiluva Chapel, which was dedicated in 1966. It displays the artistry of Lithuanian artists in exile at that time, due to Soviet occupation and repression of Lithuania during and following World War II. Vytautus Kasuba based his statue of Our Lady of Šiluva with Christ Child on written accounts of seers from 1608. Behind the statue is a mosaic wall of a blue background and golden mandorla. More mosaics by Vytautas Jonynas depict the religious and cultural history of Lithuania in two large mosaic panels on the side walls, one showing the traditional image of the Rūpintojėlis ("Christ the Worrier"), and the second depicting the Lithuanian prince, Saint Casimir. Mosaics and stained glass by Albinas Elskus decorate the golden ceiling with four images of the Virgin from Lithuanian churches, while the altar frontal shows traditional Lithuanian wayside crosses. On October 16, 2016, the Lithuanian-American community celebrated the fiftieth anniversary of the dedication of the chapel. An exhibit on the history of the chapel and its representation of Lithuanian cultural and religious traditions was hosted in the Basilica's Memorial Hall from July 1 through October 17.

Several other sites within the United States dedicated to Our Lady of Šiluva. These include shrines in Chicago, Illinois; Putnam, Connecticut; and in East St. Louis, Illinois.

- There is a statue of Our Lady of Šiluva outside the small mission church in Rincon, New Mexico.
- There is a shrine to Our Lady of Šiluva in the parish church of Saints Peter and Paul in Elizabeth, New Jersey. The shrine, dedicated June 29, 1958, is richly ornamented with Lithuanian artwork and woodcarvings, and has a painting depicting the apparition and a piece of the original rock on which the Virgin Mary stood.

Inspired by the apparition, the community returned to the devout practice of their religion. Our Lady of Šiluva is invoked for those who have lapsed from the faith, and those who pray for them.

== Legacy ==
The Knights of Lithuania have sponsored the establishment of the "Our Lady of Siluva Fund, Inc." during its 2003 National Convention in Brockton, Massachusetts, during its 90th anniversary. The purpose of the fund is to help promulgate knowledge of and devotion to Our Lady through her appearance at Šiluva.

== See also ==
- Marian devotions
- Marian apparitions
- Our Lady of the Gate of Dawn
