= Malicki =

Malicki (feminine: Malicka; plural: Maliccy) is a Polish surname. Notable people with the surname include:

- Grégory Malicki (born 1973), French footballer
- Julian Malicki (born 1961), Polish physicist
- Keram Malicki-Sánchez, Canadian actor, musician and writer
- Maria Malicka (actress) (1900–1992), Polish actress
- Maria Malicka (chess player) (born 2003), Polish chess player
- Zbigniew Malicki (1944–2022), Polish sailor

== Fictional characters ==
- Luke Malicki, character in Neighbours
