= Hedda (given name) =

Hedda is a feminine given name, sometimes a diminutive form (hypocorism) of Hedvig, Hedwig or variants thereof. Bearers of the name include:

== People ==
=== Women ===
- Hedda Østberg Amundsen (born 1998), Norwegian cross-country skier
- Hedvig Hedda Anderson (1832–1912), Swedish writer, teacher, and school founder
- Hedda Andersson (1861–1950), Swedish physician
- Hedda Berntsen (born 1976), Norwegian skier
- Hedda Bolgar (1909–2013), American psychoanalyst
- Elizabeth Hedda Dyson (1897–1951), Netherlands-born New Zealand journalist and magazine editor
- Hedda Eulenberg (1876–1960), German translator and writer
- Hedvig Hedda von Fersen (1753–1792), Swedish countess and courtier
- Hedda Strand Gardsjord (born 1982), Norwegian footballer
- Hedvig Hedda Hjortsberg (1777–1867), Swedish ballerina
- Hedda Hopper, American actress and columnist born Elda Furry (1885–1966)
- Hedda Hynne (born 1990), Norwegian middle-distance runner
- Hedwig Hedda Korsch (1890–1982), German-American educationalist and university professor
- Hedda Lundh (1921–2012), Danish resistance fighter, journalist and schoolteacher
- Hedwig Hedda Morrison (1908–1991), German-Australian photographer
- Hedda Nova (1899–1981), Russian-born American film actress
- Hedda Nussbaum (born 1942), American author
- Hedda Ødegaard (born 1995), Norwegian tennis player
- Hedda Oosterhoff, interior acoustic designer born in Holland and living in New Zealand
- Hedvig Hedda Piper (1746–1812), Swedish courtier
- Hedda zu Putlitz (born 1965), German cyclist at the 2000 Olympics
- Hedda Stiernstedt (born 1987), Swedish actress
- Hedda Sterne (1910–2011), Romanian-born American artist
- Hedda Vernon (1888–1925), German actress, screenwriter, and film producer born Hedwig Kemp
- Hedda Wardemann, 21st century German immunologist
- Anna Hedvig Hedda Wrangel (1792–1833, Swedish composer
- Hedda Zinner (1905–1994), German political writer, actress, comedian, journalist and radio director

=== Men ===
- Hædde (died 705), also spelled Hedda, monk, Bishop of Winchester and saint

== Fictional characters ==
- the title character of Hedda Gabler, an 1890 play by Henrik Ibsen
