= Hedwig =

Hedwig may refer to:

== People and fictional characters ==
- Hedwig (given name), a list of people and fictional characters with the given name
- Grzegorz Hedwig (born 1988), Polish slalom canoeist
- Johann Hedwig, (1730–1799), German botanist
- Romanus Adolf Hedwig (1772–1806), German botanist, son of Johann Hedwig

== Other uses ==
- Hedwig and the Angry Inch, a musical, a film, and its soundtrack
- Hedwig Fountain, a fountain in Zürich, Switzerland
- Hedwig glass, a type of glass
- Hedwig, code name of Red Hat Linux version 6.0, released in 1999
- 476 Hedwig, a main-belt asteroid

== See also ==
- Hedwig Village, Texas, United States, a city
- Saint Hedwig
