= Jadwiga Lenartowicz Rylko =

Polish physician (1910-2010)

Jadwiga Lenartowicz-Rylko
- Lenartowicz-Rylko on the cover of her biography published in 2014
- Born: 1 January 1910; Łódź, Poland
- Died: 2 December 2010 (aged 100)
- Education: Poznań University of Medical Sciences
- Occupation: Physician

Jadwiga Lenartowicz-Rylko (1 October 1910 – 2 December 2010) was a Polish Catholic physician imprisoned in the Ravensbruck, Gross-Rosen, Neusalz, and Flossenbürg concentration camps operated by the German Third Reich during World War II. While Lenartowicz was incarcerated as a political prisoner, she was assigned to medically treat the prisoners held captive in Adolf Hitler's multiple Nazi concentration camps by working as a camp doctor. Lenartowicz was the daughter of a feldsher. As Lenartowicz grew up, she watched her father take care of his patients in the city of Łódź. She went on to follow in his footsteps going into the medicine. Once completed with medical school, she would go on to her residency at the Anna Maria Hospital. World War II would affect her life the most when she was arrested by the Gestapo.

== Life ==
Jadwiga Helena Lenartowicz was born in Łódź as one of five daughters of Helena and Stanisław Lenartowicz, a medical practitioner. Jadwiga was three years old when her father enlisted for service in World War I. During his time in the military, the family lived off a small pension he received. Jadwiga and her family struggled with hunger; her mother would make sacrifices to wait in long lines to receive food from dispensaries. Four years later, Lenartowicz's father returned from the war. Two decades later, she again saw her father enlist in the military at the onset of World War II. Following the return to independence, the restructuring of Poland led to many changes in society; paving the way for Lenartowicz to enter the medical field. During this time, most women had taken up domestic skills, but Lenartowicz decided to go into medicine. She followed in her father's footsteps, and began her medical training, albeit, she became a physician, not a feldsher. After 6 years, Lenartowicz became a physician in the Second Polish Republic after completing her medical studies in Poznań in 1936.

=== Education ===
Lenartowicz attended Poznań University of Medical Sciences where she completed her medical education in 6 years. During her time in medical school, she was characterized as fun, playful, and silly. She was part of a new generation of educational reform. During this time, Poland underwent multiple reforms to enhance education. Due to widespread recovery from economic hardships from the war, a significant decrease in school attendance occurred. Once her medical education was completed, she began her residency at Anna Maria Hospital, where she would specialize in pediatrics. From her biography, her characterization had transitioned to a more serious and mature countenance with more responsibility at the hospital and the growing tension of another war.

=== Arrest and imprisonment ===
During the occupation of Poland by Nazi Germany, Lenartowicz was arrested by Gestapo on the night of 13 January 1944, for suspicion of political resistance. She was interrogated many times until she confessed to listening to radio broadcasts. She was sent to Ravensbruck concentration camp as a political prisoner on 17 March 1944. There, she would be known by her prisoner number and a red triangular badge marked with the letter "P". She was transported from Ravensbruck to Gross-Rosen concentration camp for Jewish female slave labor and assigned to medically treat women from sub-camps for textile factories, fields and production jobs. She was moved to Neusalz slave labor camp in Nowa Sól and from there sent on a death march. The women marched around 300 miles to Flossenbürg over 40 days. During the march, food and water became dire, and environmental conditions were extreme; prisoners and officers had very little of everything: food, water, and warmth. Lenartowicz would survive the long march, and her final stop would be Flossenbürg. In mid-April, the American allies would liberate Flossenbürg; Lenartowicz was free. After 1945, Lenartowicz stayed at a displaced persons camp.

As a camp doctor, she was given better opportunity to survive. She was given a greater quantity for her meal, better quality clothing, better hygiene, and better overall treatment. Lenartowicz treated many ill persons that were sick due to malnutrition, working conditions, and living conditions. She had minimal resources for treatment, but she managed with what she had. The youngest prisoner was 13 years of age, and the oldest around 30. Jadwiga was in charge of infirmary and prevented the outbreak of typhoid fever by begging the SS for antiserum. The number of women she saved can only be guessed. On a daily basis, she would treat patients coming in with great oversight from SS doctors, holding her accountable of any person that was not truly sick. In her biography, she often recounts that the ethical lines in medicine were blurred due to the lack of supplies and brutality of the camps. Once liberated, Lenartowicz continued her work as a doctor and treated the liberated people for malnutrition and various diseases.

=== End of World War II ===
Lenartowicz worked at various refugee camps after liberation, until the countries could reassess their borders. In 1946, she was stationed at the Kafertal refugee camp where she served as physician and was assigned a rank in the U.S. Army. Kafertal turned into a major centre for education and training of the displaced persons; Lenartowicz helped provide basic medical aid training to guards who wanted to further their job skills.

At Kafertal, Lenartowicz met Colonel Wladyslaw Rylko and married him on 28 June 1947, in Bad Soden, Germany. In 1950, Lenartowicz-Rylko gave birth to her daughter, Barbara Maria Rylko. Soon thereafter, they left Europe for the United States. Thanks to a longtime friend's willingness to sponsor their immigration, the family was able to settle into Detroit, Michigan. While in the United States, the couple faced many hardships such as finding work, proper housing, and financial stability. Unable to gain medical licensure, Lenartowicz-Rylko never practiced medicine as a physician again. Her husband died in 1969. She died in 2010 at the age of 100.

== Biographical book ==
Jadwiga Lenartowicz Rylko is the subject of a biographical book written by her own daughter, anthropologist Barbara Rylko-Bauer. The book was published by the University of Oklahoma Press as Hardcover in 2014, and as paperback in 2015 under the title A Polish Doctor in the Nazi Camps. It received several notable awards including 2015 IPPY Gold Medal in Biography, 2014 IndieFab Book of the Year Award, 2015 Michigan Notable Book Finalist, and 2015 Next Generation Indie Book Award.

== See also ==
- Stanisława Leszczyńska, Polish midwife at the Auschwitz concentration camp
- Maria Kotarba, the prisoner "Mom of Auschwitz" (Polish: Mateczka)
