= Julian Malicki =

Polish academic

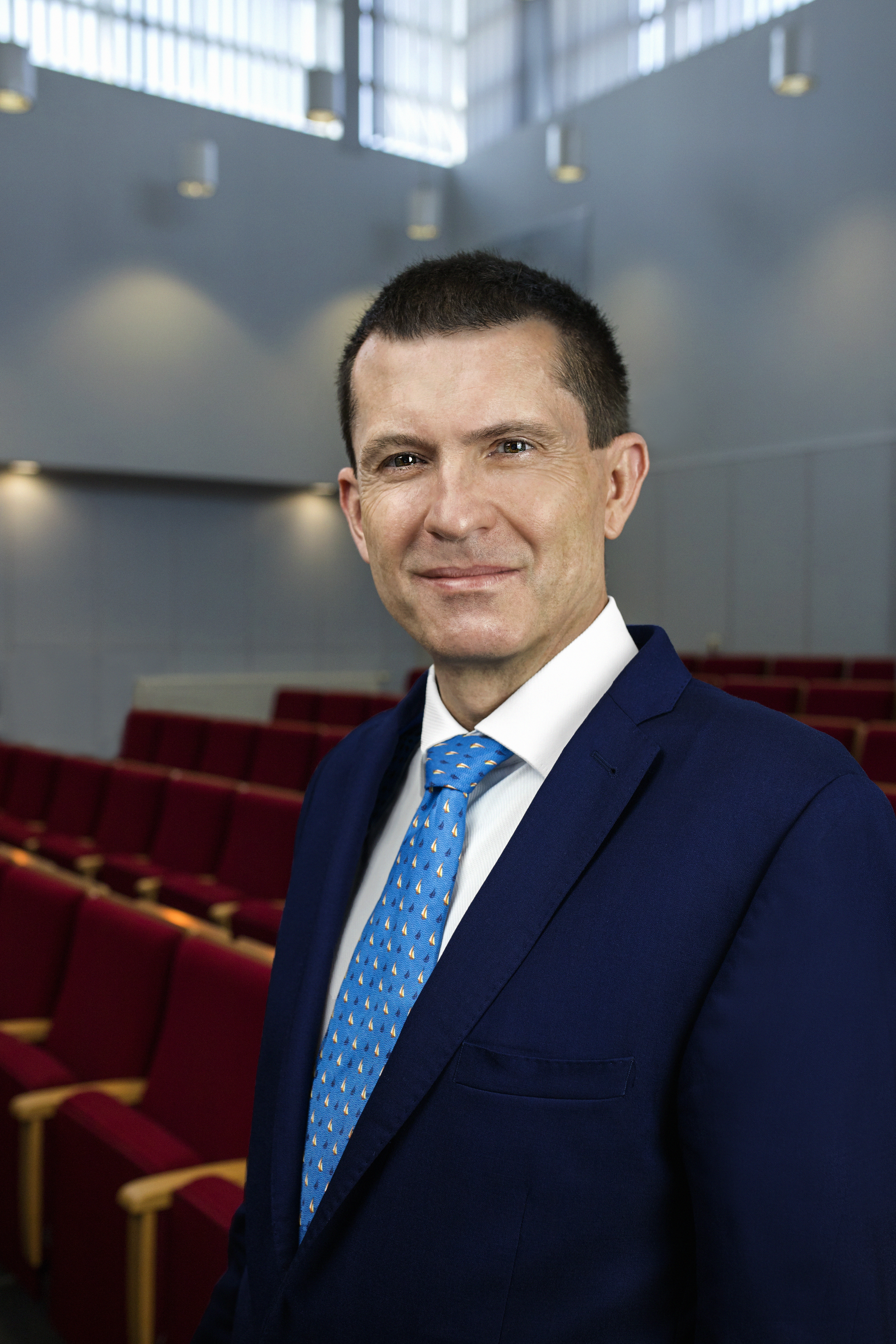
- prof. dr hab. Julian Malicki; Professor of Medical Sciences
- Born: 2 September 1961 (age 65)
- Education: Silesian University of Technology Doctorate: 1992 - Biophysics, Poznań University of Medical Sciences, Habilitation: 1999 - Radiology Poznań University of Medical Sciences, Professorate: 25 September 2009
- Awards: Golden Cross of Merit (Poland) (2016); Knight's Cross of the Order of Polonia Restituta (2020)
- Scientific career
- Fields: Radiotherapy, physics
- Workplaces: The Greater Poland Cancer Centre Poznań University of Medical Sciences Adam Mickiewicz University in Poznań

Julian Czesław Malicki (born 2 September 1961) is a Polish physicist, professor of medical sciences and academic teacher at the Poznań University of Medical Sciences and The Adam Mickiewicz University in Poznań. Since 1995 the Director of the Greater Poland Cancer Centre.

== Education and research ==
Malicki was born on 2 September 1961. He graduated in technical physics from the Silesian University of Technology in Gliwice, Poland in 1985. In 1992, he obtained his doctoral degree from the University of Medical Sciences in Poznań (doctoral thesis entitled "Model of electromagnetic ionizing radiation dose distributions in a biological object"). In 1993 he was a fellow of the Council of International Programs at Indiana University in Indianapolis (USA) ).In 1994, he received a master's degree in law from the University of Silesia in Katowice, Poland. He obtained his habilitation at the University of Medical Sciences in Poznań in 1999 based on the assessment of his scientific achievements and the thesis entitled "Dose distributions and their fractionation in the method of whole-body irradiation before bone marrow transplantation". He was awarded the academic title of Professor of Medical Sciences in 2009.

His research interests include, among others, the following: interaction of ionizing radiation with biological objects; methods of verifying irradiation using in vivo dosimetry and imaging techniques; whole-body irradiation before bone marrow transplantation; and the standardization of radiotherapy procedures in the European Union. He is also active in field of health care optimisation. His recent research activity is focused on the implementation of international clinical audits in radiation oncology and on influence of individual predisposition on response to ionising radiation.

He has published numerous articles in international journals, including the top journals in the field of radiotherapy and medical physics (Radiotherapy & Oncology, Radiology and Oncology, Physica Medica, Reports of Practical Oncology and Radiotherapy).

== Professional career ==
From 1985 to 1990 he worked as a medical physicist at the Oncology Institute in Gliwice. In 1990, he became the head of the Department of Medical Physics at the Greater Poland Cancer Centre. In 1995, he became the director of the Greater Poland Cancer Centre. Since 2004, he has been the head of the Department of Electroradiology, and since 2005 the professor at the Poznań University of Medical Sciences. He is also professor at the Faculty of Physics at Adam Mickiewicz University. From 2016 to 2020 he was a member of the senate at the University of Medical Sciences in Poznań. He served as National Consultant in Medical Physics from 2016 to 2019.

He is a member of several scientific societies, including the Polish Society of Radiation Oncology (vice-president 2003–2013), the European Society of Therapeutic Radiology and Oncology (ESTRO, board member 2003–2005), the Polish Society of Medical Physics (PSMP), the American Society of Radiation Oncology (ASTRO), Latin American Society of Radiation Oncology (ALATRO), and American Association of Physicists in Medicine (AAPM). He was a member (2004–2007) of the Committee of Medical Physics, Radiobiology, and Diagnostic Imaging of the Polish Academy of Sciences.

He led a project financed by the European Commission known as ACCIRAD, whose aim was to develop guidelines for accidental and unintended exposures in radiological practices (2011–2013). He was a member (2008–2014) of the ESTRO working group "Health Economics in Radiation Oncology (HERO)", a project to determine cancer incidence and staging, radiotherapy utilisation rates, and staffing and equipment levels in European countries. Since 2014, he has co-led the multicentre, international IROCA (Improving Radiation Oncology through Clinical Audits) project.

Since 1996, he has been the editor-in-chief of the scientific journal Reports of Practical Oncology and Radiotherapy. He is a member of the scientific council of the Letters in Oncology Science (previously editor-in-chief). He was a member of the board of the journal Physica Medica from 2007 to 2015. Since 1997, he has been a member of the scientific council of the journal Contemporary Oncology

== Awards ==
- Golden Cross of Merit (2016)
- Badge of honour "For services to the Greater Poland Voivodeship" (2018)
- Knight's Cross of the Order Polonia Restituta (2020)
