= Hedwig (given name) =

- Gender: Female

Origin
- Origin: Old High German
- Region of origin: Germany, Austria

Other names
- Related names: Edwige, Jadwiga, Hadewijch, Hedvig, Hedda, Hedy, Hedwige

Hedwig is a German feminine given name, from Old High German Hadwig, Hadewig, Haduwig. It is a Germanic name consisting of the two elements hadu "battle, combat" and wig "fight, duel". The name is on record since the 9th century, with Haduwig, a daughter of Louis the German. The name remained popular in German high nobility during the 10th and 11th centuries. Other medieval spellings include Hathuwic, Hathewiga, Hadewich, Hadewic, Hathwiga, Hadwich, Hatwig, Hadwig, Hediwig, Hedewiga, Hedewich, Hedewiih, Hatuuih, Hetvic, Haduwich, Hadawich, Hatuwig, etc. Forms such as Hadiwih, Hadewi, etc. suggest that the name is the result of a conflation of two separate names, one with the second element wig "fight", the other with the second element wih "hallowed".

A common German (and also Dutch) diminutive of Hedwig is Hedy. The Dutch form of Hedwig is Hadewych (Hadewijch). The German name was adopted into Swedish (and to a lesser extent into Danish and Norwegian) in about the 15th century and is still in use in Swedish with the spelling Hedvig, with a diminutive Hedda. A Finnish form is Heta. The German name was adopted into Polish, as Jadwiga. A French form is Edwige (not to be confused with the unrelated Anglo-Saxon Eadwig or Edwig).

== People named Hedwig ==
=== Medieval ===
- Hedwiga (Hedwig of Babenberg; died c. 886), Duchess of Saxony, mother of Henry the Fowler
- Hedwige of Saxony (910–965), German noblewoman and mother of Hugh Capet, King of France
- Hedwig of Nordgau (ca. 922–ca. 993), wife of Siegfried of Luxembourg, first Count of Luxembourg.
- Hedwig of France (970–1013), also called Avoise, Hadevide or Haltude, Countess of Mons
- Saint Hedwig of Silesia (1174–1243), Duchess of Silesia, canonized 1267; see also Hedwig Codex
- Hedwig of Habsburg (d. ca. 1285/86), daughter of Rudolph I of Germany and his first wife, Gertrude of Hohenburg
- Hedwig of Holstein (1260–1324), Swedish queen consort, spouse of King Magnus III of Sweden
- Saint Hedwig of Poland (1373–1399), daughter of Louis I of Hungary and ruling queen of Poland

=== Renaissance and early modern periods ===
- Hedwig Jagiellon (1408-1431), Polish and Lithuanian princess, daughter of Jogaila, King of Poland and Grand Duke of Lithuania, and Anna of Celje
- Hedwig, Abbess of Quedlinburg (1445–1511), Princess-Abbess of Quedlinburg from 1458 until her death
- Hedwig Jagiellon, Duchess of Bavaria (1457–1502), daughter of the King Casimir IV Jagiellon of Poland and Elisabeth Habsburg of Hungary, wife of George, Duke of Bavaria
- Hedwig Jagiellon, Electress of Brandenburg (1513–1573), daughter of Sigismund I the Old and his first wife Countess Barbara Zápolya, wife of Joachim II Hector, Elector of Brandenburg
- Princess Hedwig of Denmark (1581–1641)
- Hedwig Eleonora of Holstein-Gottorp (1636–1715), Queen of Sweden from 1654 until 1660
- Countess Palatine Hedwig Elisabeth of Neuburg (1673–1722) German-Polish princess
- Hedwig Elisabeth Charlotte of Holstein-Gottorp (1759–1818) Queen-consort of Sweden Norway

=== Modern era ===
- Hedwig Anneler, Swiss ethnologist and writer
- Hedwig Dohm (1831–1919), German feminist
- Hedwig von Rittberg (1839–1896), Prussian-German decorated nurse, hospital supervisor
- Hedwig Bleibtreu (1868–1958), Austrian actress
- Hedwig Dransfeld (1871–1925), German feminist
- Hedwig Kohn (1887–1964), pioneering German physicist
- Hedwig Porschütz (1900–1977), Righteous Among the Nations from Germany
- Hedwig Bienenfeld (1907–1976), Austrian-American Olympic swimmer
- Hedwig Potthast (1912–1994), German private secretary and mistress of Reichsführer-SS Heinrich Himmler
- Hedy Lamarr (1914–2000), Austrian and American actress born Hedwig Kiesler
- Hedwig von Trapp (1917–1972), Austrian singer, daughter of Georg von Trapp, fictionalised as Brigitta in The Sound of Music
- Hedwig Goebbels (1938–1945), one of the Goebbels children
- Hedwig Keppelhoff-Wiechert (born 1939), German politician
- Hedwig von Beverfoerde (born 1963), German political activist

== Fictional characters ==
- Hedwig (Harry Potter), Harry Potter's faithful messenger and pet snowy owl in the Harry Potter novels by J. K. Rowling
- Hedwig, a nine-year-old boy alter of Kevin Wendell Crumb in the film Split
- The protagonist of Hedwig and the Angry Inch (musical), an off-Broadway production
  - Same protagonist in the musical's film adaptation Hedwig and the Angry Inch (film)
- Hedvig Ekdal, the daughter in Henrik Ibsen’s play The Wild Duck
- Hedwig, the wife of Wilhelm Tell in Friedrich Schiller's 1804 play Wilhelm Tell
- Hedwig, recurring character in the SCP Foundation universe, leader of the Maxwellist denomination of the Church of the Broken God
- Sister Hedwig, the protagonist of the visual novel series Misericorde

== See also ==
- Avis (name)
- Blessed Hadewych of Meer (c. 1150–1200)
- Hadewijch, 13th century poet and mystic
