= Edwige =

Edwige is a feminine French given name. Notable people with the name include:

- Edwige Avice, French politician
- Edwige Belmore, French model, singer, and actress
- Edwidge Danticat, Haitian-American novelist
- Edwige Djedjemel, Ivorian basketball player
- Edwige Fenech, Italian actress and film producer
- Edwige Feuillère, French film actress
- Edwige Gwend, Italian judoka
- Edwige Lawson-Wade, French basketball player
- Edwige Pitel, French cyclist
- Edwige-Renée Dro, Ivorian writer, translator and literary activist
- Vige Langevin, born Edwige Grandjouan, French educator, artist, writer

== See also ==
- Edwidge Danticat, Haitian-American author
- Hadewijch
- Hedwig (given name)
- Jadwiga
