= Basilica of the Nativity of the Blessed Virgin Mary, Šiluva =

Roman Catholic basilica in Lithuania

Basilica of the Nativity of the Blessed Virgin Mary Švč. Mergelės Marijos Gimimo bazilika
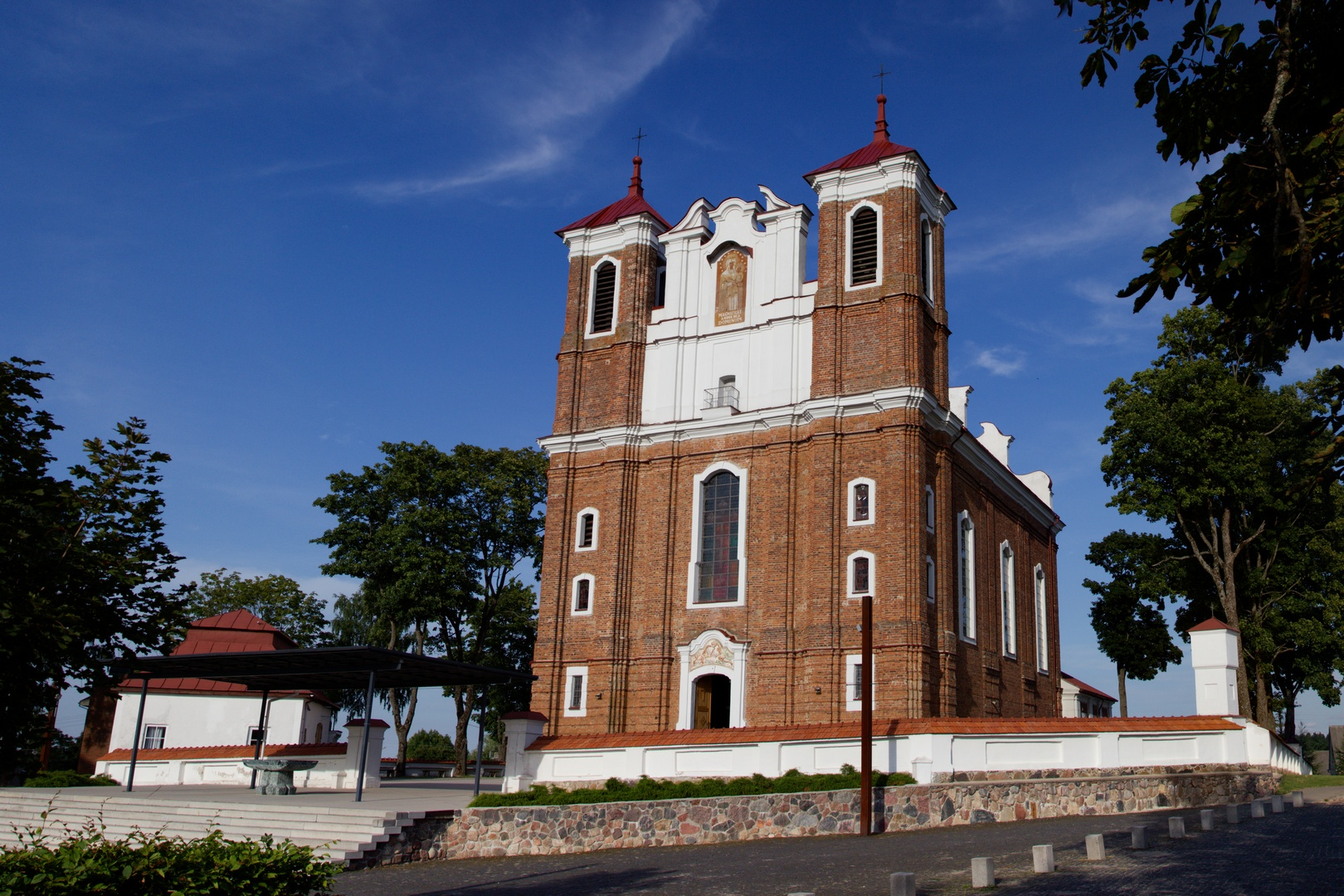
- Façade of Basilica of the Nativity of the Blessed Virgin Mary

Religion
- Affiliation: Roman Catholic
- Leadership: Roman Catholic Archdiocese of Kaunas
- Year consecrated: 1775

Location
- Location: Šiluva, Lithuania
- Interactive map of Basilica of the Nativity of the Blessed Virgin Mary; Švč. Mergelės Marijos Gimimo bazilika
- Coordinates: 55°31′48.8″N 23°13′28.68″E

Architecture
- Type: Church
- Style: Baroque
- Completed: 1775
- Materials: Plastered masonry

Website
- Siluva.lt

The Basilica of the Nativity of the Blessed Virgin Mary (Lithuanian: Švč. Mergelės Marijos Gimimo bazilika) is a Roman Catholic basilica in Šiluva, Lithuania. The basilica is famous for the annual mass feasts dedicated to the Blessed Virgin Mary. Part of its organ dates back to the 18th century.

The shrine venerates the image of the Blessed Virgin Mary titled as Our Lady of Siluva. Pope John Paul II raised the shrine to the status of Minor Basilica via his Pontifical decree Constat Intra Fines on 6 May 1988.

== Gallery ==
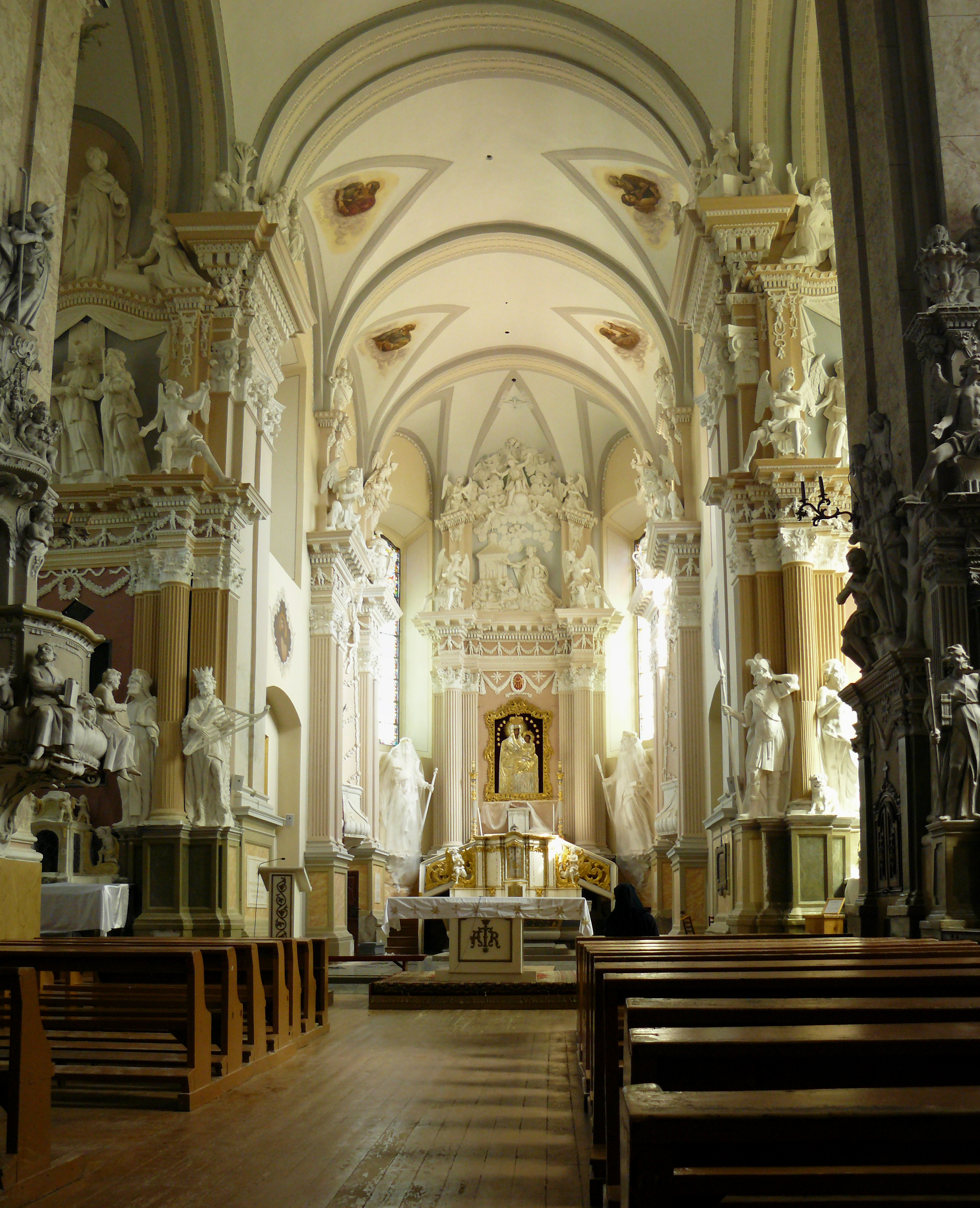
Interior viewing to the main altar

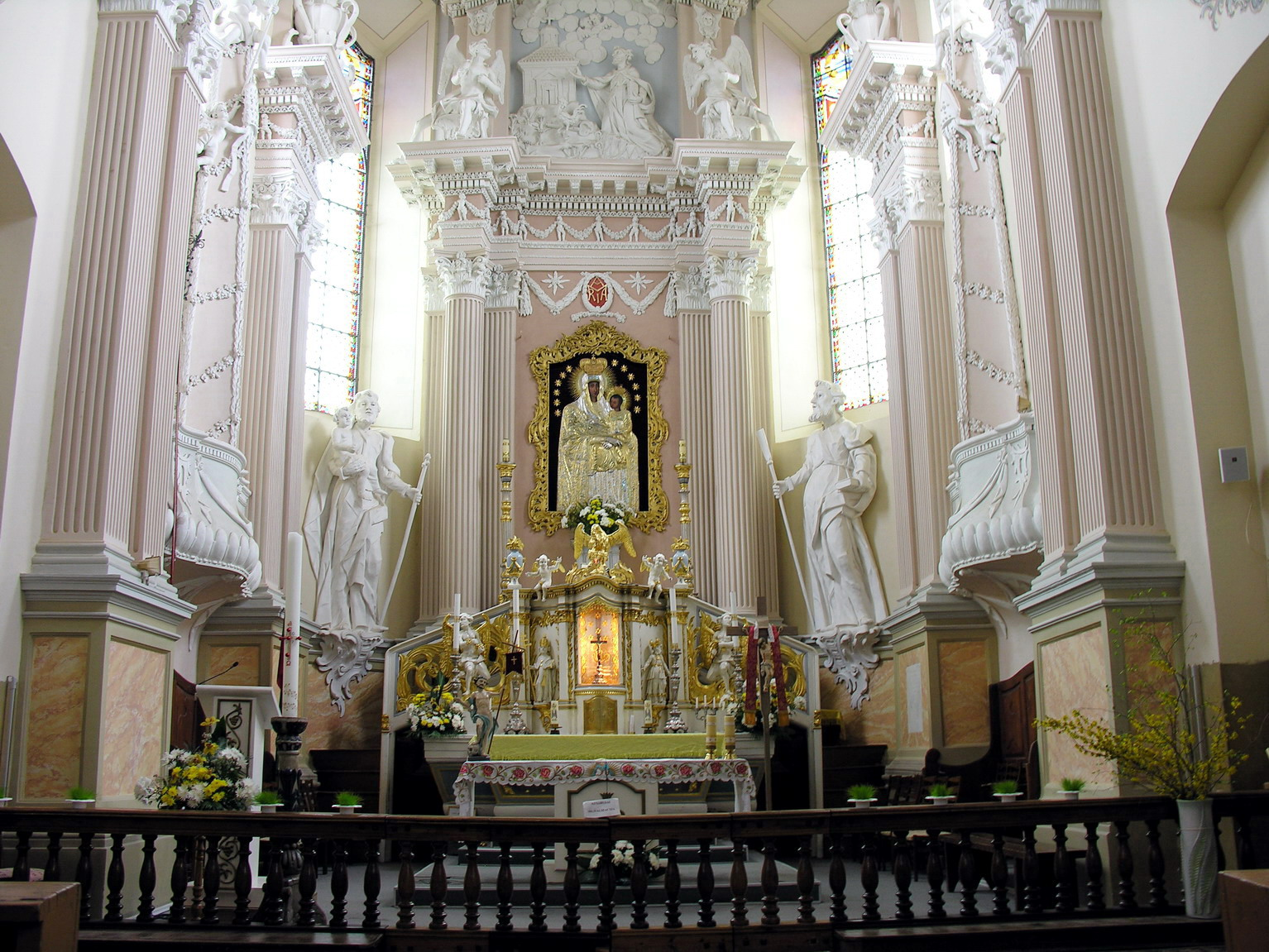
Main altar

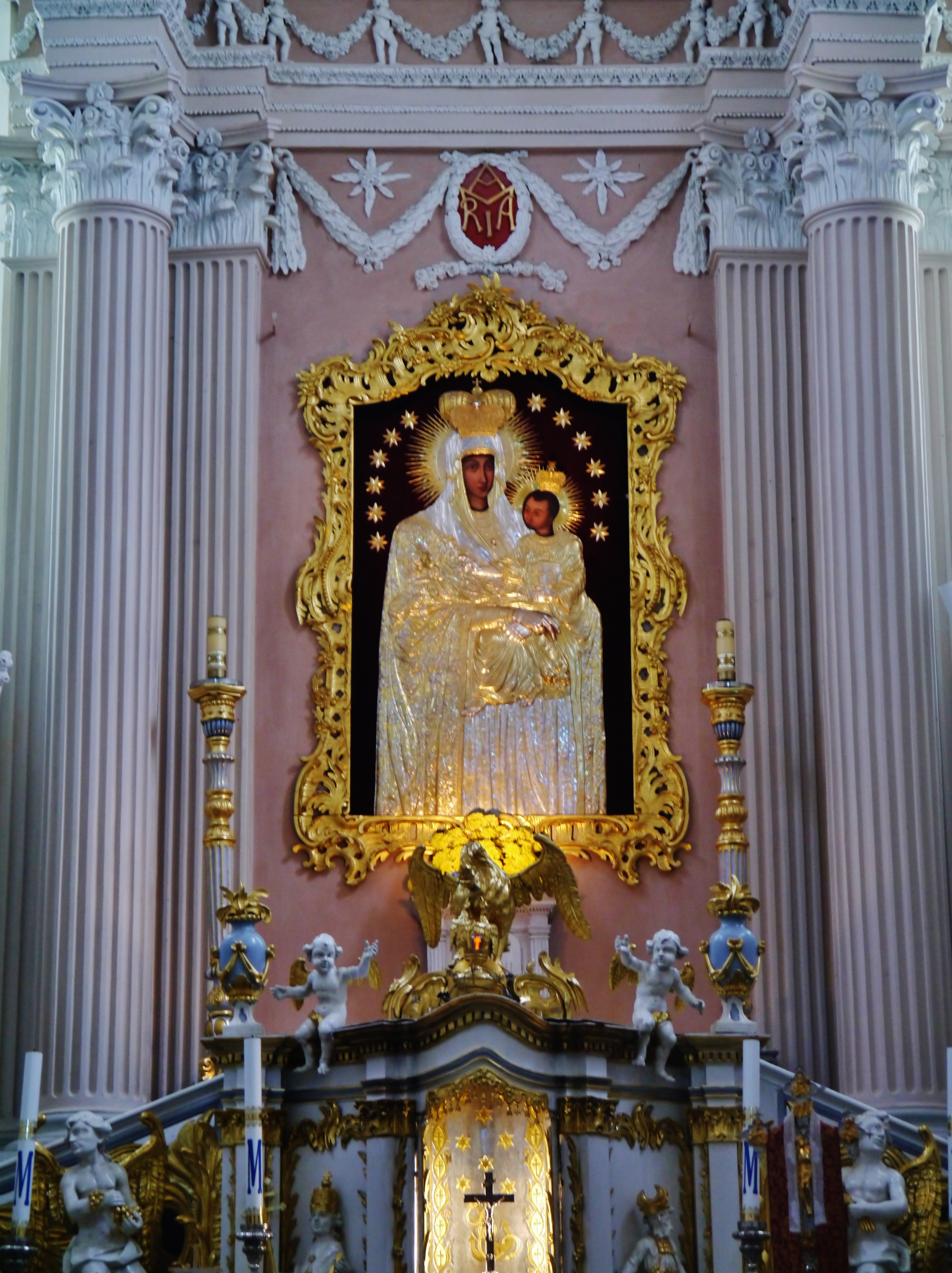
Painting of the Blessed Virgin Mary in the central altar

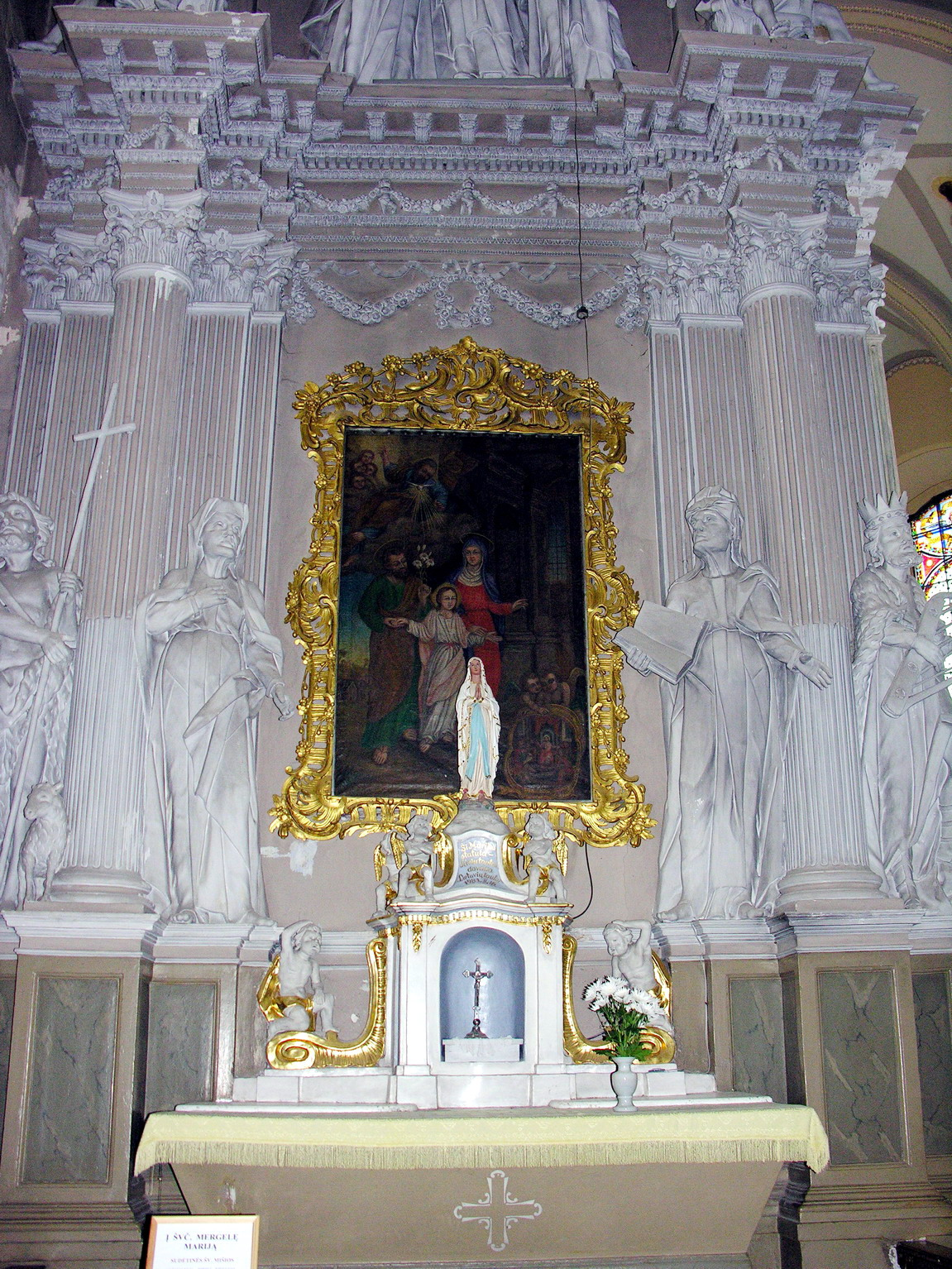
Left side altar

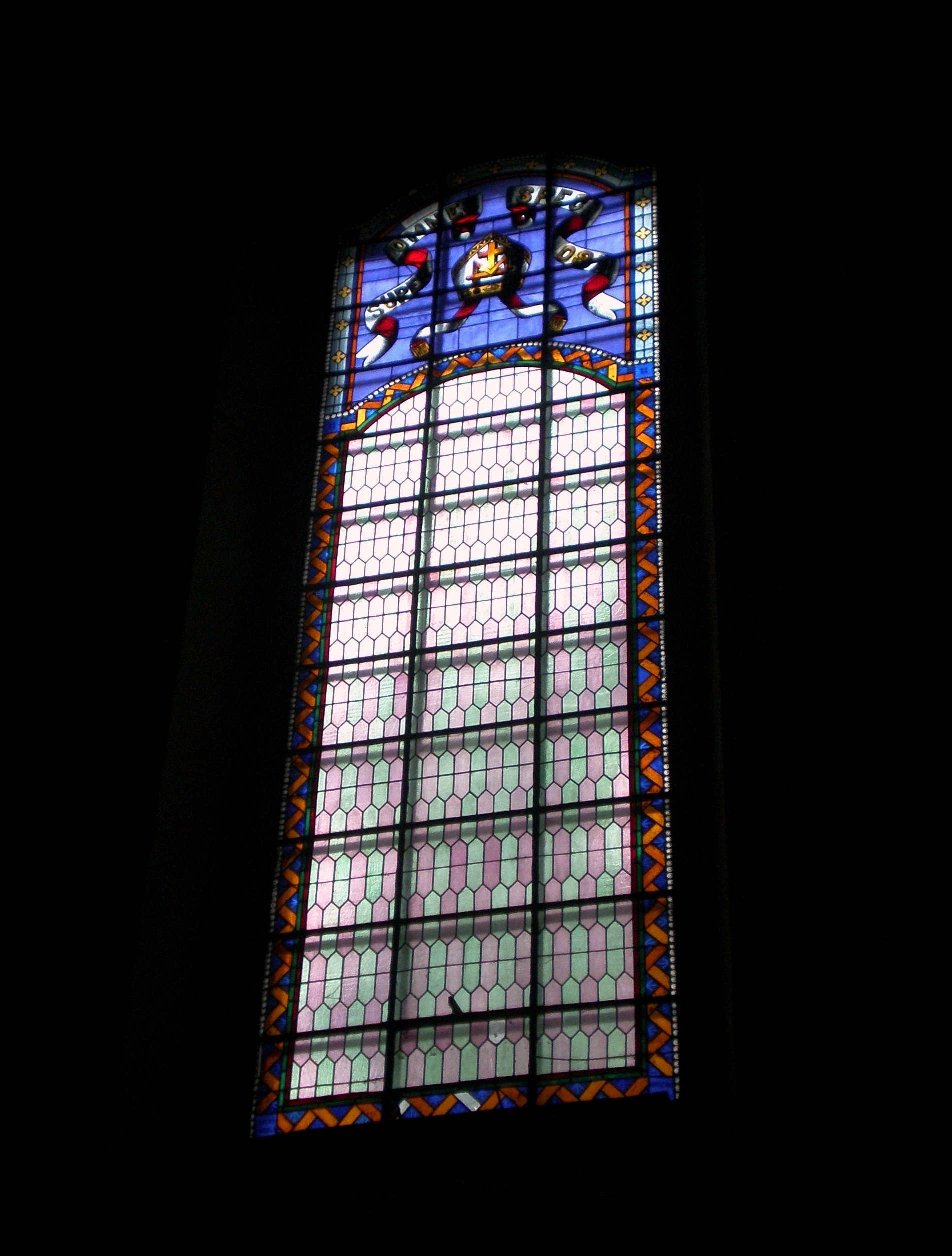
One of the stained glasses of the church
