= Radek Bukowski =

Polish researcher

- Occupations: Doctor, academic physician scientist and inventor

Academic background
- Education: M.D. Ph.D., Reproductive Sciences; M.S., Medical Sciences
- Alma mater: Poznan University of Medical Sciences; Freie Universitaet Berlin

Academic work
- Institutions: University of Texas at Austin

Radek Bukowski is a doctor, academic physician, scientist and an inventor. He is the director of Computational Health & Medicine Initiatives at the Texas Advanced Computing Center, at University of Texas at Austin.

Bukowski is most known for his works in the fields of computational medicine, preterm birth, maternal fetal, and neonatal mortality and morbidity and fetal growth abnormalities. His works have been published in New England Journal of Medicine and American Journal of Obstetrics and Gynecology. He is also the recipient of 2008 March of Dimes Award for his research in prematurity.

== Education ==
Bukowski completed his M.D. degree from Poznan University of Medical Sciences in Poland in 1986. He completed his residency in obstetrics and gynecology at the same institution between 1986 and 1990. Later in 1993, he obtained a Ph.D. in reproductive sciences from Freie Universitaet Berlin. In 2002, he completed another master's degree in medical sciences from University of Texas Medical Branch at Galveston.

== Career ==
In 1998, Bukowski joined the Department of Obstetrics and Gynecology at the University of Texas Medical Branch as an assistant professor, a position he held until 1999. Subsequently, he pursued a fellowship in the Division of Maternal Fetal Medicine within the Department of Obstetrics and Gynecology at the University of Texas Medical Branch from 1999 to 2002. Following this, he assumed the role of assistant professor of obstetrics and gynecology in the Division of Maternal Fetal Medicine at the University of Texas Medical Branch. Between 2005 and 2010, he served as an associate professor. This led to his appointment as a professor of obstetrics and gynecology in the same department, where he served from 2010 to 2014. In 2014, he moved to the Yale School of Medicine, holding the position of professor of obstetrics, gynecology, and reproductive sciences. From 2016 to 2023, he held the position of professor in the department of Women's Health at the University of Texas at Austin. He has been associate editor for computational medicine at the American Journal of Obstetrics and Gynecology since 2020.

Between 2014 and 2016, Bukowski held the position of director of the Division of Maternal Fetal Medicine in the Department of Obstetrics, Gynecology, and Reproductive Sciences at Yale School of Medicine.

Bukowski holds patent to a framework that utilizes a computer system and machine learning model to predict the probability of Cesarean delivery during attempted vaginal delivery based on characteristic values of a pregnancy.

== Research ==
Bukowski's work has been featured in various media outlets, including New York Times, Time Magazine, The Guardian and CNN.

In 2005, Bukowski served as a key contributor in a clinical trial focusing on Down's syndrome screening methods. His collaborative efforts demonstrated the superiority of first-trimester combined screening, showcasing comparable results to second-trimester quadruple screening. Building on this, he delved into obstetric challenges related to stillbirths in 2007. Partnering with other experts in the area, he discussed the challenges in determining their precise causes, reviewing known and suspected factors, and highlighted the importance of systematic evaluation and ongoing research efforts by the NICHD Stillbirth Collaborative Research Network. In 2011, with other members of the Network, he conducted a population-based study investigating causes of death among stillbirths. The results revealed that systematic evaluations identified probable or possible causes in the majority of cases, with obstetric conditions and placental abnormalities emerging as the most common factors. Moreover, notable racial disparities in stillbirth rates and causes were also highlighted. In 2012 research, he and other members of the Network, compared microarray and karyotype analyses in stillbirth cases, concluding that microarray analysis, particularly successful with nonviable tissue, is more likely to provide a genetic diagnosis, especially in cases involving congenital anomalies or when karyotype results are unattainable.

Further expanding his research work, Bukowski, along with FD Malone and others, explored the correlation between first-trimester fetal growth, measured by crown-rump length, and birth outcomes in a collaborative study from 2007. This research unveiled a significant association between early fetal growth and birth weight, duration of pregnancy, and a reduced risk of small-for-gestational-age infants. Moreover, in 2009, he investigated preconceptional folate supplementation and its impact on spontaneous preterm birth in low-risk pregnancies. His findings demonstrated a 50%-70% reduction in the risk of early preterm birth (20–32 weeks) with one or more years of preconceptional folate supplementation. The study also revealed a decreasing risk with longer supplementation periods and no association with other complications. In a related research article, he with others introduced a comprehensive system for classifying spontaneous preterm birth. This system allowed for identifying groups of women with similar spontaneous preterm birth origins.

Bukowski's collaborative study with Karen E. Davis and Peter W. F. Wilson found that delivering a small for gestational age (SGA) infant significantly increases a mother's risk of developing ischemic heart disease (IHD) independently of traditional risk factors, suggesting pregnancy-related factors may cause long-term cardiovascular changes. He conducted another study, which revealed that women who give birth to infants with higher birth weights are at an increased risk of developing breast cancer later in life, a risk that is independent of their own birth weight, traditional breast cancer risk factors, and is associated with a pregnancy hormonal environment that may promote breast cancer development. Moreover, investigating the association between fetal growth abnormalities, specifically small for gestational age (SGA) and large for gestational age (LGA), and the risk of stillbirth, his 2014 research revealed that both severe SGA and severe LGA are associated with an increased risk.

Concentrating his research efforts on computational medicine, Bukowski's 2021 collaborative study emphasized the constraints of conventional medical decision-making, highlighting the need for individualized care, and proposed the role of computational models in revolutionizing medicine for improved outcomes and cost-of-care reduction.

== Awards and honors ==
- 2001 – Research Excellence Award, Society for Maternal-Fetal Medicine
- 2001 – Presidents Award, Society for Gynecologic Investigation
- 2008 – March of Dimes Award, March of Dimes

== Selected articles ==
- Malone, F. D., Canick, J. A., Ball, R. H., Nyberg, D. A., Comstock, C. H., Bukowski, R., ... & D'Alton, M. E. (2005). First-trimester or second-trimester screening, or both, for Down's syndrome. New England Journal of Medicine, 353(19), 2001–2011.
- Silver, R. M., Varner, M. W., Reddy, U., Goldenberg, R., Pinar, H., Conway, D., ... & Stoll, B. (2007). Work-up of stillbirth: a review of the evidence. American journal of obstetrics and gynecology, 196(5), 433–444.
- Bukowski, R., Smith, G. C., Malone, F. D., Ball, R. H., Nyberg, D. A., Comstock, C. H., ... & D'Alton, M. E. (2007). Fetal growth in early pregnancy and risk of delivering low birth weight infant: prospective cohort study. Bmj, 334(7598), 836.
- Bukowski, R., Carpenter, M., Conway, D., Coustan, D., Dudley, D. J., Goldenberg, R. L., ... & Stillbirth Collaborative Research Network Writing Group. (2012). Causes of death among stillbirths. Obstetrical & Gynecological Survey, 67(4), 223–225.
- Reddy, U. M., Page, G. P., Saade, G. R., Silver, R. M., Thorsten, V. R., Parker, C. B., ... & Levy, B. (2012). Karyotype versus microarray testing for genetic abnormalities after stillbirth. New England journal of medicine, 367(23), 2185–2193.
