= Andrzej Grzybowski =

Polish ophthalmologist

Andrzej Edward Grzybowski (born October 19, 1968) is a Polish ophthalmologist, professor of medical science, lecturer of the Department of Ophthalmology at the University of Warmia and Mazury in Olsztyn, founder of Nationwide Education Operator., and Foundation for Ophthalmology Development "Ophthalmology 21".

He is the editor-in-chief of Archiwum Historii i Filozofii Medycyny, Archive of the History and Philosophy of Medicine and Historia Ophthalmologica Internationalis.

Grzybowski's clinical and scientific interests include the anterior segment of the eye, diseases of the retina, myopia prevention and control, artificial intelligence, ocular infections prevention and treatment, economization of health-care and the history of medicine.

== Career ==
He received his medical diploma at the Poznań Medical Academy (since 2007 — Poznań University of Medical Science ) in 1993.

He received his doctoral degree in 1997, following the submission of a thesis titled: In vitro studies of the anti-oxidative mechanisms of human peritoneal mesothelial cells in selected peritoneal dialysis conditions. In 2003, he received his Master of Business Administration diploma from the Poznań University of Economics and Business. He obtained his post-doctoral degree in 2010 at the Medical University of Łódź, following the examination of his academic achievements and submission of a thesis titled: "Polish 19th Century Studies in the Areas of Retinal Anatomy, Physiology and Pathology with the Consideration of the Surrounding Structures". He was granted full professorship in medical science in 2018.

In the years 2008–2017 he was the head of the ophthalmology ward at the Poznań Municipal Hospital (ul. Szwajcarska). He worked as a lecturer at the Department of the History of Medical Science at the Poznań University of Medical Sciences and at the Department of Physics at Adam Mickiewicz University. In the years 2010–2015, he was the Greater Poland Regional Consultant for ophthalmology. In 2012-2023 he was the head of the Department of Ophthalmology at the University of Warmia and Mazury in Olsztyn. He has been a lecturer at the European School for Advanced Studies in Ophthalmology (ESASO) in Lugano Switzerland.

In 2025, he has been appointed a Visiting Professor at the Zhongshan Ophthalmic Center, Sun Yat-sen University, Guangzhou, China, and at Shandong University of Traditional Chinese Medicine. In the same year, he was appointed Honorary Professor at the Joint Shantou International Eye Center of Shantou University and The Chinese University of Hong Kong.

== Publications and editorial work ==
He authored or co-authored around 500 academic papers published in peer-reviewed journals. He also authored or edited the following books:

- OCT in Central Nervous System Diseases: The Eye as a Window to the Brain, Grzybowski A., Barboni P. (eds.), Springer 2016.
- Ophthalmology care in diabetic patients — selected international experiences, A. Grzybowski (ed)., Foundation for the Development of Ophthalmology "Ophthalmology 21", Poznań 2016.
- Physicians — patrons of streets in Greater Poland — a biographical dictionary, Grzybowski A. (ed)., Foundation for the Development of Ophthalmology "Ophthalmology 21", Poznań 2017.
- Endophthalmitis in Clinical Practice, Flynn Jr. H.W., Batra N.R., Schwartz S.G., Grzybowski A., Springer 2018.
- Ophthalmology — textbook, A. Grzybowski(ed.), Edra Urban & Partner, Wrocław 2018.
- Current Concepts in Ophthalmology, A. Grzybowski(ed.), Springer 2019.
- OCT and Imaging in Central Nervous System Diseases, Grzybowski A., Barboni P. (eds.), Springer 2020.
- Artificial Intelligence in Ophthalmology 1st ed. 2021 Edition, Grzybowski A. (ed.) Department of Ophthalmology, University of Warmia and Mazury Olsztyn Poland, Springer 2021.

== Research on the use of Artificial Intelligence in Ophthalmology ==
In 2021, Prof. Grzybowski published a book titled Artificial Intelligence in Ophthalmology, the first comprehensive work on the role of AI in modern ophthalmology. In 2024, the book was translated into Chinese. Additionally, in the same year, he authored over 20 publications on the subject of artificial intelligence.

He is the first person in Poland to undertake research on using artificial intelligence to detect diabetic retinopathy. His project is one of the largest of its kind in Europe.

In 2024, he founded The International AI in Ophthalmology Society. This organization aims to integrate healthcare professionals and computer scientists to share key initiatives, scientific knowledge, and practical applications of AI in ophthalmology. It also seeks to support legal regulations ensuring the responsible implementation of AI in healthcare.

== Non-academic activity ==
In the years 1998–2001, he was the deputy mayor of Poznań for health and social care; in the years 2002–2006, he was also the chair of the Health and Social Policy Commission in the Poznań City Council. He is the founder of the "Familijny Poznań" foundation (now — "Nationwide Education Operator") (est. 2001) as well as the "Ophthalmology 21" Foundation for the Development of Ophthalmology (est. 2012).

== Awards and honors ==
Brown and Silver Cross of Merit and the Order of Polonia Restituta Knight's Cross (2014).

In 2020 as the only Polish ophthalmologist he was included in TOP 2% ranking of world-best scientists prepared by Stanford University for 2019. In 2024, he was once again included on this list as one of the most influential researchers worldwide.

In 2021, he was ranked in Expertscape worldwide ranking: No 1 in cataract field and No 1 in cataract extraction field.

In 2021 (during American Academy of Ophthalmology conference) he received the "Founders' Award" of the International Society of Refractive Surgery (ISRS).

In 2022 awarded the Officer's Cross of the Order of Polonia Restituta by the President of Poland.

In 2022, he was elected a member of the Academia Europaea.

In 2024 (for the period up to 2022), he was included in the ScholarGPS ranking as one of the top 0.05% of scientists with the greatest impact on global scientific development. He was ranked as the highest-ranking Polish researcher in ophthalmology and secured 3rd place worldwide in his specialization—cataract treatment. Among all fields of medicine, he ranked 2nd among Polish researchers.

In 2024 and in 2025, he was featured on the prestigious The Ophthalmologist Power List, which highlights the most influential ophthalmologists globally.
