= Jadwiga Vuyk =

Polish-Dutch art dealer and historian

- Born: Jadwiga Reich Rosenblatt; 30 April 1886; Łódź
- Died: November 18, 1950 (aged 64); Amsterdam

Jadwiga Vuyk, née Jadwiga Reich Rosenblatt (1886 – 1950) was a Polish-Dutch art dealer and art historian.

Vuyk was born in Łódź and married the Dutch banker Pieter Vuyk in Edmonton in 1912, whom she divorced in 1930. She had already moved to Amsterdam with her daughter Margueritha Vuyk in 1927. She is known for publications on Dutch masters, most notably Anthonie Blocklandt van Montfoort and Jacobus Storck.

Vuyk died in Amsterdam.

== Works ==
- Zwei Altarflügel von Anthonie Blocklandt van Montfoort, in Oud Holland, 45, 1928 pp. 159–176
- Les dessins hollandais du XVIesiècle dans la collection Degrez du Musée de Bruxelles: I. Quatre dessins de Cornelis Cornelisz de Harlem, in Oud Holland, 46, 1929 pp. 214–221
- Anthonie Blocklandt van Montfoort, II, in Oud Holland, 46, 1929 pp. 106–114
- Anthonie Blocklandt van Montfoort, III, in Oud Holland, 48, 1931 pp. 72–82
- Contribution to Mélanges Hulin de Loo, Essays written in honour of G. Hulin de Loo, edited by Paul Bergmans. With a portrait, 1931
- Ein Frauenbildnis von Blocklandt van Montfoort, in Oud Holland, 48, 1931 pp. 142–143
- Johannes of Jacobus Storck of Sturck?, in Oud Holland, 52, 1935 pp. 121–126
- Catalogus grafische kunst in Polen, 1948
