= Rita Vuyk =

Dutch psychologist and professor

- Born: Margueritha Vuyk; 22 June 1913; London, United Kingdom
- Died: 20 March 1989 (aged 75); Amsterdam, Netherlands
- Citizenship: Netherlands
- Education: University of Amsterdam (MA 1940; PhD 1945)
- Known for: First female professor of psychology in the Netherlands; "Methode Vuyk" for collaborative learning
- Scientific career
- Fields: Developmental psychology
- Workplaces: University of Amsterdam

Margueritha "Rita" Vuyk (22 June 1913 – 20 March 1989) was a Dutch psychologist and professor of developmental psychology at the University of Amsterdam. In 1960 she became the first woman in the Netherlands to hold a professorship in psychology. She is known for her work on children’s resilience and her interpretations of Jean Piaget's work.

== Early life and education ==
Vuyk was born in London on 22 June 1913, the daughter of Pieter Vuyk, a banking executive, and Jadwiga Rosenblatt, an art historian. She grew up in Zandvoort, Baarn, and Amsterdam. In 1935 she began studying psychology at the University of Amsterdam, where she was influenced by Géza Révész, and Willem Bonger. Vuyk earned her master’s degree in 1940 and completed her doctorate in letters and philosophy in 1945 under Révész, with the dissertation Experimenteel onderzoek over analogievorming en inductie bij vijf- en zesjarige kinderen (“Experimental research on analogy formation and induction in five- and six-year-old children”).

== Career ==
After receiving her doctorate, Vuyk joined the university’s Psychological Laboratory as an assistant. In 1948 she was appointed privaatdocent in the psychology of early childhood, delivering her first inaugural lecture, Het fantasieleven van het kleine kind in de psychologie en psychoanalyse (“The fantasy life of the young child in psychology and psychoanalysis”). She became lector in 1952 and gewoon hoogleraar (full professor) in 1960 with the inaugural lecture De persoonlijkheidsontwikkeling in gezinnen met twee zoons (“Personality development in families with two sons”); this position made her the first woman in the Netherlands to hold a professorship in psychology.

Her research focused on developmental and educational psychology, emphasizing how family dynamics, birth order, and adverse home environments shape children’s resilience and personality. She argued that social and clinical interventions should strengthen children’s coping capacities rather than pathologize their differences.

Following the Dutch Mammoetwet educational reform of 1968, Vuyk developed the Methode Vuyk, a cooperative learning program for first-year secondary students that encouraged collaboration among pupils of differing abilities and talents. In later years she turned toward the work of Jean Piaget, producing several books and articles that offered a critical synthesis of his theory of cognitive development.

== Selected publications ==
- Experimenteel onderzoek over analogievorming en inductie bij vijf- en zesjarige kinderen (Amsterdam, 1945) OCLC 48817145
- Plaatjes als hulpmiddel bij het kinderpsychologisch onderzoek (Leiden: Stenfert Kroese, 1954) OCLC 8710343
- Das Kind in der Zweikinderfamilie (Bern: Huber, 1959) OCLC 4321163
- De persoonlijkheidsontwikkeling in gezinnen met twee zoons (Amsterdam: Noord-Hollandsche Uitgevers Maatschappij, 1960) OCLC 20235019
- Leerboek der Psychologie (with Bert Duijker and B.G. Palland; Groningen: Wolters-Noordhoff, 1970) OCLC 423007760
- Werk- en denktraining in de studielessen (Purmerend: Muusses, 1970) OCLC 251839525
- Overview and Critique of Piaget’s Genetic Epistemology, 1965–1980 (London: Academic Press, 1981) OCLC 7197234
- Panorámica y crítica de la epistemología genética de Piaget, 1965–1980 (Madrid: Alianza, 1984–1985) OCLC 1023941704
- Optimizar el desarrollo: unas nociones teóricas y prácticas (Madrid: Alianza, 1985) OCLC 10136966514
- Opgroeien onder moeilijke gezinsomstandigheden (Amersfoort: Bekking, 1986) OCLC 1410314982

== Legacy ==
Vuyk retired in 1978 and died in Amsterdam on 20 March 1989. Psychologist Ad Dudink, writing in an obituary for De Psycholoog, described her as “a resilient and independent woman who insisted that every child be seen as unique — never merely as a case or a type.” Since 2009, the University of Amsterdam has hosted the annual Rita Vuyk Lecture in her honor, featuring national and international scholars in developmental psychology.

== See also ==
- Women in psychology
- University of Amsterdam
