= Jadwiga Lachowska =

Polish soprano (1892 – after 1962)

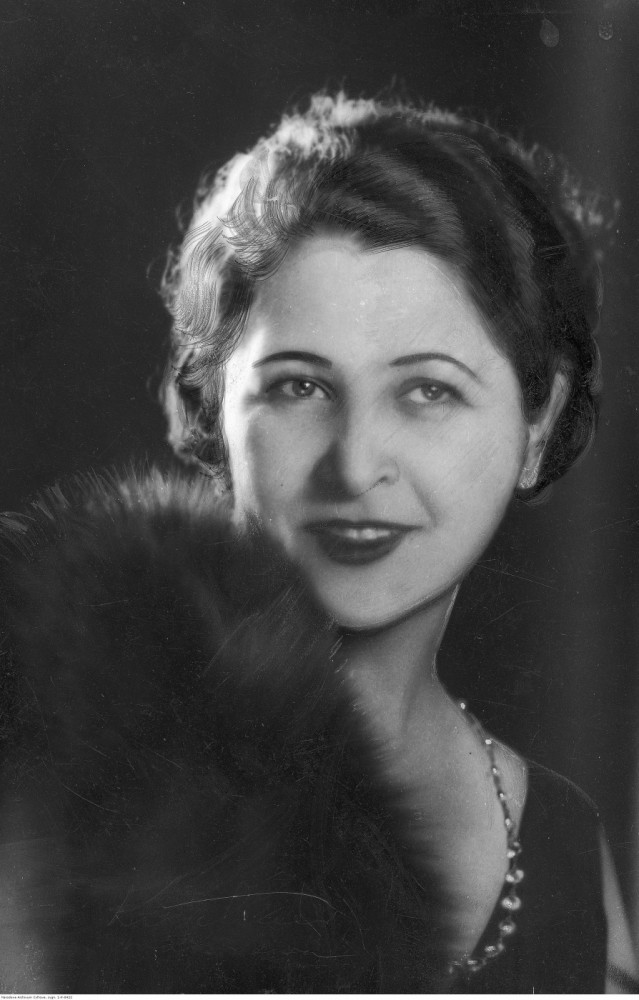
Aga Lahowska

Jadwiga Aga Lachowska de Romanska (1 January 1892 – after 1962) also known as Aga Lahowska-Mundell was a Polish operatic soprano and mezzo-soprano. She developed part of her professional career in Spain in close collaboration with Manuel de Falla.

== Life ==
Lahowska was born in Lviv. In Poland she distinguished herself by playing the leading role in Halka by Stanisław Moniuszko. Lahowska and Falla gave recitals in Spanish philharmonic and cultural recitals and always maintained a friendship of singular cordiality.

On 8 October 1917, she went with Manuel de Falla to Fuendetodos to the inauguration of a school built with funding from the painter Ignacio Zuloaga, organiser of the event, and of a monument in homage to Francisco de Goya. After the mass celebrated in the church which preserves the frescoes of a young Goya and the subsequent banquet in the Town Hall, the soprano sang the jota of the Siete canciones, without accompaniment, from the balcony overlooking the town's main square, for the townspeople present.

Before the end of the year, she began a new tour with him in the north of Spain. He was in Oviedo to sing under his baton with the Sociedad Filarmónica de Oviedo. They performed works by Manuel de Falla himself, Turina, Guridi and the local composer Baldomero Fernández.

In 1918, she continued to give recitals. In April, she attended the tribute given to Debussy at the Madrid Athenaeum, together with Salvador, Falla and Arthur Rubinstein, also Polish and very close to the Cadiz-born musician.

In her repertoire there were a large number of composers, highlighting works by Manuel de Falla and Joaquín Turina among many others.

In 1920, she premiered at the Edificio Coliseo Albia in Bilbao the opera Amaya by Jesús Guridi, alongside Ofelia Nieto, the tenor Isidoro de Fagoaga, Giulio Cirino and the bass Gabriel Olaizola.

On 14 June 1922, she attended the Concurso de Cante Jondo held in Granada, Andalusia, organised by the Andalusian composer Manuel de Falla and strongly supported from the beginning by the Andalusian poet Federico García Lorca.

She performed at the Liceu in the 1919-1920 and 1921–1922 seasons. In November 1921, she opened the opera season with Louise, conducted by La Rotella and accompanied by performers such as Genevieve Vix, Paul Goffin and Julien Laffont.

On 12 August 1925, she married Howell Dawson Mundell in London, an English lawyer based in Singapore.

In May 1945, she gave a recital in Australia, the event being picked up by the newspaper The Sydney Morning Herald, New South Wales. The reviews were very favourable and the singer received a long standing ovation.
