= Jadwiga Zakrzewska =

Polish politician (born 1950)

Member of the Sejm
- In office 25 September 2005 – 2015
- Constituency: 20 – Warsaw II

Personal details
- Born: 1950 (age 75–76)
- Party: Civic Platform

Jadwiga Teresa Zakrzewska (born 4 November 1950 in Płońsk) is a Polish politician. She was elected to the lower house of the Polish parliament (the Sejm) on 25 September 2005, getting 4972 votes in 20 Warsaw districts as a candidate from the Civic Platform list. She ended her term in 2015.

She was also a member of Sejm 1997-2001.

== See also ==
- Members of Polish Sejm 2005-2007
