= Jadwiga Ostrowska-Czubenko =

Polish chemist

- Born: 18 January 1949 (age 77); Kołobrzeg, Poland
- Citizenship: Poland
- Education: Nicolaus Copernicus University in Toruń (PhD, 1980; Hab. 2002)
- Scientific career
- Fields: physical chemistry
- Workplaces: Nicolaus Copernicus University in Toruń
- Theses: Association of functional groups in polycarboxylic and sulphonic polymers in the anhydrous state and in gels with low hydration (1980); Binding of metal ions in solutions of simple models of bacterial polymers (2002)

Jadwiga Barbara Ostrowska-Czubenko (born 18 January 1949 in Kołobrzeg) is a Polish chemist at the Nicolaus Copernicus University in Toruń.

== Biography ==
Ostrowska-Czubenko attended the Nicolaus Copernicus University in Toruń, majoring in chemistry. She graduated in 1972, defended her doctoral thesis eight years later, and completed her habilitation in 2002. She is associate professor in the Department of Chemistry at the Nicolaus Copernicus University, where she specializes in physical Chemistry and physicochemistry of polymers.

== Awards ==
- Award of the Ministry of Science and Higher Education (1985)
- Award of the Scientific Secretariat of the Polish Academy of Sciences (1980, 1989)
- Member of the Polish Chemical Society (1985)
