= Hedwig Anneler =

Swiss ethnologist and writer

Hedwig Anneler (February 5, 1888, Thun — May 8, 1969, Givrins, canton of Vaud) was a Swiss ethnologist and writer. She was married to Léonard Jenni.

== Life ==
Hedwig Anneler's father was Franz Ludwig Anneler (*1847). He was a letterpress printer and manufacturer of letterpress rollers. Her mother was Marie Anneler, née Beck from Neuhausen. Hedwig grew up with three siblings. She studied history at the University of Bern and completed her studies in 1912 with a PhD in philosophy. In the following years, she engaged in intensive folklore studies of the Lötschental, which form the basis of her work Lötschen. She also published fiction works, some of which were influenced by Expressionism. As early as the 1930s, Anneler campaigned for a relaxation of the restrictive Swiss asylum practice. Her most important literary work, the novel Blanche Gamond, depicts the fates of victims of Huguenot persecution and expulsion in the 17th century. By the time of her death, the author had already been largely forgotten.

== Works ==
- On the history of the Jews of Elephantine, Bern 1912
- Quatember in Lötschen, Bern 1916
- Lötschen, Bern 1917 (together with Karl Anneler)
- Kleines Lötschenbuch, Bern 1923
- Aletschduft, Basel 1925
- Der Glücksbogen, Bern 1925
- Blanche Gamond, Zurich 1940

== Literature ==
- Bettina Vincenz: Biederfrauen oder Vorkämpferinnen? The Swiss Association of Women Academics (SVA) in the interwar period. Hier + Jetzt, Baden 2011, ISBN 978-3-03919-198-7.
- Stadler, Judith Hélène/Knauf, Ernst Axel: Hedwig Anneler (1888–1969) and her Bernese dissertation Zur Geschichte der Juden von Elephantine from 1912. A commemoration of the centenary of the doctorate of a remarkable woman. lectio difficilior 2/2011. www.lectio.unibe.ch (PDF, 2.7 MB)
- Stadler, Judith Hélène: Marie Anneler Beck and Hedwig Anneler. The forgotten commitment of two women to Jews. In: Bloch, René et al. (eds.): Wie über Wolken. Jewish worlds of life and thought in the city and region of Bern 1200–2000. Zurich: Chronos 2014:193–200.
- Stadler, Judith Hélène: Hedwig Anneler (1888–1969): On the history of the Jews of Elephantine. In: Source of living books. 75 years of the library of the Jewish Community of Zurich. Biel: Edition Luks 2014
