= Hedwig and the Angry Inch =

Hedwig and the Angry Inch may refer to:

- Hedwig and the Angry Inch (musical), 1998
  - Hedwig and the Angry Inch (soundtrack), 1999
- Hedwig and the Angry Inch (film), 2001
