= Jadwiga Szopieraj =

Polish female photographer, 20th century

- Born: 1908; Leszczyce, German Empire
- Died: 1975 (aged 66–67); Bydgoszcz, Poland
- Known for: Pictures
- Partner: Piotr Szopieraj

Jadwiga Szopieraj (1908-1975) was a Polish woman who pioneered professional photography during the interwar in Bydgoszcz, Poland.

== Life ==
Jadwiga Krygier was born in Leszczyce, a small town 8 km south west of Inowrocław. As a teenager, she left her hometown to move to Bydgoszcz, to a relative's house.

Jadwiga apprenticed with the master of photography Tytus Piechocki. The latter is known to have taken pictures of the First City Council in Bydgoszcz (1920-1921) and a portrait of Polish actress Pola Negri.

When Piechocki founded the Bydgoszcz Guild of Photographers (Polish: Cech Fotografów w Bydgoszczy) in 1937, Jadwiga was one of the few women member of the 37-people strong association. Over time, she took over Tytus studio.

Jadwiga married Piotr Szopieraj, a tailor by trade. They bought in the 1920s a photography studio and a flat at 8 Świętojańska street (the villa is no more existent) from the Salewskis'. The premises (house and studio) dated back to the end of the 19th century, built with a glass roof on a design by local photographer Carl Weiss. He ran here his workshop for 20 years; the place was then bought by the Salewski family who rented it to other photographers.

The Salewski couple soon divorced, but kept living in separate flats, next to each other in the same tenement: he was at number one, she at number two, where she also had a photography studio. In those times, the Szopieraj must have lived somewhere nearby as portraits of Jadwiga and her husband posing in Zalewska's studio have been found.

Jadwiga and Piotr had four children, a boy and three girls. They lost their youngest daughter in 1937.

During World War II, Jadwiga had to close her studio since Germans did not allow Poles to work for money. However, it is known that she was still taking photos covertly. The Nazis took her husband and her son as forced labor to work on ditches near Grudziądz in 1944. In February 1945, the men returning to Bydgoszcz were stopped and shot down by the Red Army in Janowo, near Bydgoszcz. Lastly, she lost her second daughter, 7-year-old Krysia, in 1946. Szopieraj made post-mortem pictures of all her daughters: Terenia (1938), Krysia (1946) and Lidka (1951).

After the war, Jadwiga Szopieraj operated her studio on Świętojańska Street until the 1960s. She lived there until her demise in 1975 and her surviving daughter stayed at the same address till 2000, when the family tenement was razed down.

== Commemorations ==
=== Book ===
Jadwiga Szopieraj was the main subject of the book "Profession: Photographer" (Polish: Zawód: Fotografistka), by Katarzyna Gębarowska and Małgorzata Czyńska. Their work was awarded the "Łuczniczki Arrow" (Polish: Strzałą Łuczniczki) at the "Bydgoszcz Literary Award 2019" (editorial category) and won as well a distinction at the 60th national "Competition of the Polish Society of Book Publishers" (Polish: Polskie Towarzystwo Wydawców Książek) in 2019 (category:"Most Beautiful Books of the Year").

=== Exhibition ===
Her photographic works were presented at the exhibition Eros and Thanatos. Pioneers of professional photography from Bydgoszcz 1888–1945 (Polish: Eros i Tanatos. Bydgoskie pionierki fotografii zawodowej 1888–1945), housed by the Regional Museum of Bydgoszcz from 12 November to 8 December 2019.

=== Mural ===
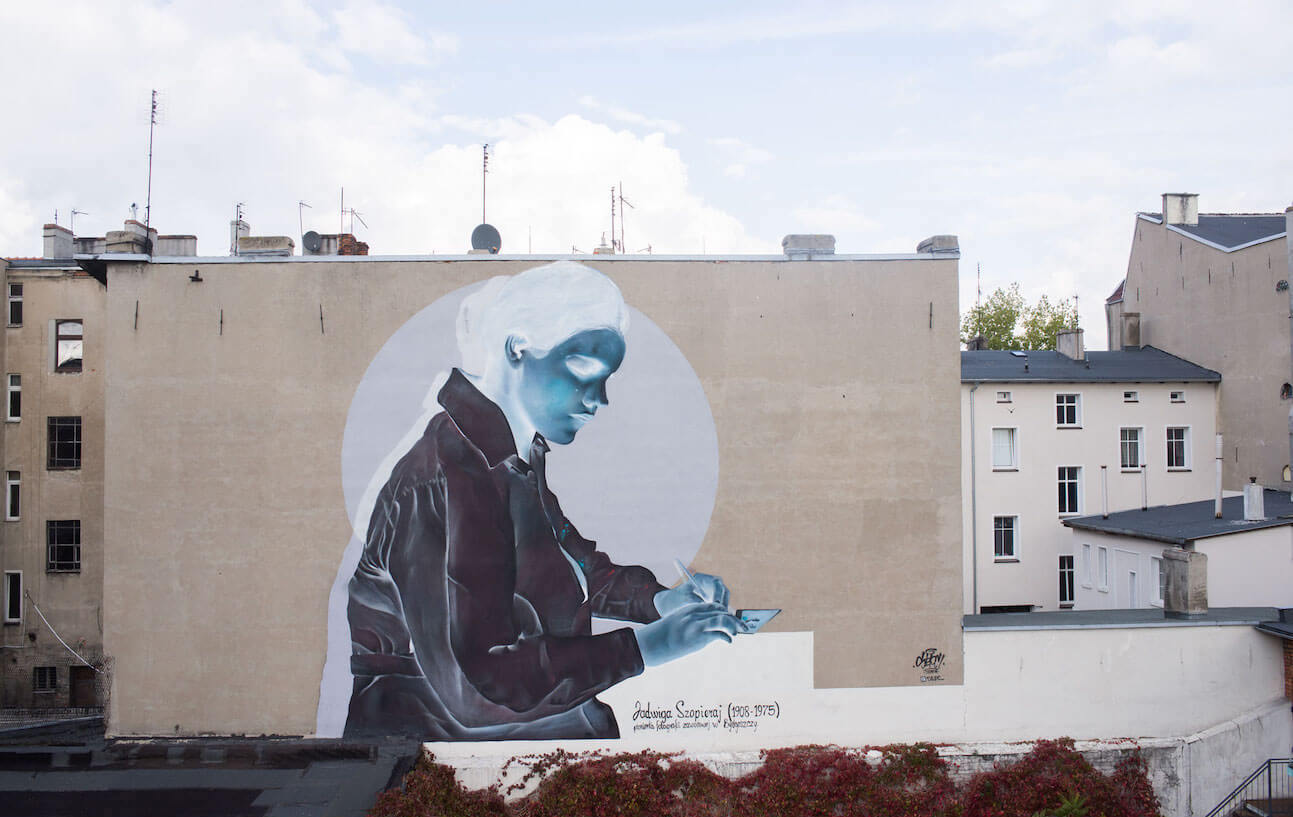
Jadwiga Szopieraj mural

Jadwiga Szopieraj is the topic of a mural created by the artist SEPC in 2019 during the fifth edition of the Vintage Photo Festival.

The mural covers the wall of the tenement at 68 Pomorska street where seats the Fundacjia Fotografistka, on Świętojańska Street, near the ancient studio of the photographer. True to his technique, SEPC's painting is realized as a negative picture. The real image is visible only after "reversing" the colors to positive.

SERPC is the pseudonym of a Colombian painter, Juan Sebastian Jimenez. For Jadwiga's mural, the artist used as a reference an archival photo found by Katarzyna Gębarowska, a researcher and director of the Vintage Photo Festival. The photo was originally hand-colored by Jadwiga herself, an habit she kept even after WWII.

== See also ==
- Bydgoszcz
- Świętojańska Street, Bydgoszcz
- Oskar Ewald Tenement
