= Hedvig =

Hedvig is a given name of German origin, derived from hadu ("battle, combat") and wig ("fight, duel"). Notable people with the name include:

== People ==
- Hedvig Catharina De la Gardie (1732–1800), Swedish noblewoman of French descent
- Hedvig Catharina Lilje (1695–1745), Swedish noblewoman, salonist and informal amateur-politician
- Hedvig Charlotta Nordenflycht (1718–1763), Swedish poet, feminist and salon-hostess
- Hedvig Eleonora Church, church in central Stockholm, Sweden
- Hedvig Eleonora of Holstein-Gottorp (1636–1715), the queen consort of King Charles X of Sweden and queen mother of King Charles XI
- Hedvig Eleonora von Fersen (1753–1792), Swedish noblewoman
- Hedvig Elisabeth Charlotte of Holstein-Gottorp (1759–1818), the queen consort of Charles XIII of Sweden, famed diarist, memoirist and wit
- Hedvig Hricak (born 1946), Croatian American radiologist
- Hedvig Karakas (born 1990), Hungarian judoka
- Hedvig Lindahl (born 1983), Swedish soccer goalkeeper
- Hedvig Malina, ethnic Hungarian student from Slovakia, physically assaulted in a hate crime incident
- Hedvig Raa-Winterhjelm (1838–1907), Swedish actor active in Sweden, Norway and Finland
- Hedvig Sohlberg (1858-1937), politician, educator, temperance reformer
- Hedvig Sophia of Sweden (1681–1708), Duchess of Holstein-Gottorp, was the eldest child of King Charles XI of Sweden
- Hedvig Taube (1714–1744), Swedish noblewoman, official mistress to King Frederick I of Sweden
- Hedvig Wigert (1748–1780), Swedish opera singer

== Fictional characters ==
- Hedvig, a main character in Henrik Ibsen's play the Wild Duck

== See also ==
- Death of Hedviga Golik (1924–1966), a woman who died of natural causes whose body was not discovered for 42 years
- Hedwig (disambiguation)
- Hedwig (given name)
