= Hedda Wardemann =

German immunologist

- Education: Albert-Ludwig-University
- Alma mater: Max Planck Institute of Immunobiology and Epigenetics
- Scientific career
- Fields: Immunology
- Institutions: German Cancer Research Center

Hedda Wardemann works in the Division of B cell immunology at the German Cancer Research Center in Heidelberg, Germany.

== Education and scientific career ==
Hedda Wardemann studied Biology at the Albert-Ludwig-University in Freiburg from 1992 until 1998. In 1998 she started as a researcher at the Max Planck Institute for Immunobiology, where she graduated in 2001.

Wardemann moved to New York, United States, to work in the laboratory of Michel C. Nussenzweig at the Rockefeller University until 2003. From 2003 to 2005, she held a position as Research Assistant in Nussenzweigs group before she joined a junior research group at the Max Planck Institute for Infection Biology in Berlin, Germany. Since 2014 Hedda Wardemann participates in the B cell immunology division at the German Cancer Research Center in Heidelberg, Germany.
