= Antonina Leśniewska =

Polish pharmacist

Antonina Leśniewska (1866 in Warsaw – 12 March 1937 in Warsaw) was a Polish pharmacist, social and educational activist, owner of the first women's pharmacy in St. Petersburg, patron of the Warsaw Museum of Pharmacy.

== Biography ==
Antonina Leśniewska was born in Warsaw in 1866, the daughter of Bolesław Leśniewski, a doctor, and Michalina née Szeluto. Until 1882 she studied at Henryka Czarnocka's boarding school in Warsaw, where she completed six grades. It was then that her family decided to move to St. Petersburg, where her father served as a freelance doctor. She completed her seventh grade at the Catholic high school at St. Catherine's Church on Nevsky Prospekt. Greatly influenced by her father, she began to pursue her dream of pursuing a pharmaceutical education. She continued her education at the Bestuzhev Higher Courses for Girls in St. Petersburg. After completing the courses in 1889, she worked as a teacher, and in 1892 she was employed in one of the St. Petersburg pharmacies.

In order to start an apprenticeship in a pharmacy, she first had to supplement her education with a Latin course, which was lacking in the programs of girls' school. In the boys' school, where she took the Latin exam, she was the first woman in history to do so there. She then started an apprenticeship in her hometown, where there was only one pharmacy. Its owner, as a friend of Leśniewska's father, took the girl in for an apprenticeship. After completing her compulsory internship, Leśniewska tried to get permission to start her studies, but the authorities of the University of St. Petersburg agreed to it only after a few months. Despite being accepted, she was not allowed to use the university's laboratories and had to find a room that was hardly visible to outsiders, where she could conduct classes, and she had to attend lectures and demonstrations in physics individually.

In 1897 she passed the exam for a provisional officer at the Military Medical Academy. In 1900, she became the first woman in Russia to obtain a master's degree in pharmacy.

In 1901 she opened a pioneering women's pharmacy in St. Petersburg, establishing it in the building of the Polish Charity Society at St. Catherine's Church in St. Petersburg on Nevsky Prospekt. In 1903 she opened a Pharmaceutical School for Women with a two-year curriculum at her pharmacy. Thanks to the courses at this school, 14 women became provisional assistants and 184 became pharmacists' assistants. Leśniewska was also the initiator of the establishment of the Association of Women Pharmacists in St. Petersburg (1905) and the Union of Equal Rights of Polish Women (1910). At the outbreak of World War I, Leśniewska began to work for the benefit of Polish prisoners of war and war refugees (among others, in the Society for Aid to War Victims). She also became involved in political activity, joining the Polish Independence Association.

In 1919 she settled permanently in independent Poland. She initiated the activity of a home for Polish repatriates in Ciechocinek. In 1921 she founded a children's orphanage in Stara Miłosno near Warsaw (later taken over by the Anti-Tuberculosis School League and transformed into a sanatorium). In 1933 she returned to the profession of a pharmacist and opened a pharmacy on Marszałkowska Street in Warsaw on the basis of a concession. She ran this institution until the end of her life.

She described her experiences in paving the way for women to become pharmacists in her memoirs Po neprotorennoj doroge (The Unpaved Trail), published in St. Petersburg in 1901.

She was buried at the Powązki Cemetery in Warsaw (section C-6-8)

== Orders and decorations ==
- Knight's Cross of the Order of Polish Restituta (27 November 1929)

== Commemoration ==
In 1985, one of the pharmacies opened by the company was located in a tenement house at 72 Marszałkowska Street in Warsaw. The Museum of Pharmacy named after her was established at Piwna Street.
