= Poznań University of Medical Sciences =

Polish medical university

Coordinates: 52°24′34″N 16°55′8″E

Poznan University of Medical Sciences
- Uniwersytet Medyczny im. Karola Marcinkowskiego w Poznaniu
- Latin: Universitas Studiorum Medicorum Posnaniensis nomine Caroli Marcinkowski nuncupata
- Type: Public
- Established: 1919/1950
- Rector: prof. dr hab. n. med. Zbigniew Krasiński
- Students: 7,343 (12.2023)
- Address: ul. A. Fredry 11, 61-701, Poznań, Poland
- Affiliations: Socrates-Erasmus
- Website: www.ump.edu.pl

Poznan University of Medical Sciences (Polish: Uniwersytet Medyczny im. Karola Marcinkowskiego w Poznaniu) is a prominent Polish medical university, located in the city of Poznań in western Poland. It traces its beginnings to the foundation of Poznań University in 1919, and was formed as a separate institution in 1950. It gained the status of university in 2007.

== History ==
The history of Poznan University of Medical Sciences started in 1919 when a pharmaceutical department was created at the University of Poznań. A year later (in 1920) the Faculty of Medicine was founded within it (in fact, this faculty existed since 1919 as a part of Poznań Society of Friends of Arts and Sciences). The chair of Dentistry was created in 1929. The first rector of Poznan University was Heliodor Święcicki and first dean of the Faculty of Medicine was Professor Adam Wrzosek.

In the late autumn of 1939, the University of Poznań was closed by German occupation authorities, but many of its professors continued to teach. In 1940 an underground University of the Western Lands was formed in Warsaw which comprised the faculties of Medicine, Pharmacy and Dentistry, with most of the faculty coming from the Poznań University. In 1941, the Polish School of Medicine at the University of Edinburgh was founded, where the first dean was surgeon Antoni Jurasz from the University of Poznań. In the last months of the war, during the battle of Poznań, preparations for reopening of the university were begun. The university officially reopened in April 1945, before the end of the war.

According to a plan of reform in 1950, the Medical Faculty, with the Department of Dentistry and the Faculty of Pharmacy of University of Poznań, were detached to form an independent school named the University of Medical Sciences. In 1975 a new Faculty of Nursing was founded, and in 1979 a Department of Medical Analytics was opened. In 1984, the Sejm (the Polish national parliament) named the school after Karol Marcinkowski, a distinguished Polish physician and patriot of the first half of the 19th century who had lived in Poznań, and who was a symbol of the highest professional and ethical values in medicine. In 1992 the Faculty of Medicine was divided into Faculty of Medicine I, responsible for the six-year Polish MD program, and Faculty of Medicine II, comprising the divisions of Dentistry, Post Graduate Medical Education and Medicine and Dentistry with English as the teaching language.

In 1991, the university introduced programs in English, starting in 1993 with the four-year MD program based entirely on the American curriculum and the requirements of the United States Medical Licensing Examination (USMLE) system. A six-year MD program in English based on the European model followed a year later. Both programs have instituted National Board of Medical Examiners (NBME) subject examinations and compulsory completion on USMLE licensing examinations as a requirement for students. Subsequently, PUMS reached the last of its planned English-language based projects with the introduction of a five-year Dentistry program in 2000, and five-year MSc Pharmacy program in 2004, which was replaced by the six-year Pharm. D. program in 2009, and three-year BSc Physiotherapy program in 2009. These programs meet the European requirements. The students of the English programs are represented by the English Programs' Student Union (EPSU).

On 27 February 2007 the Polish name of school was changed from Akademia Medyczna im. Karola Marcinkowskiego w Poznaniu to Uniwersytet Medyczny im. Karola Marcinkowskiego w Poznaniu.

== Science and research ==
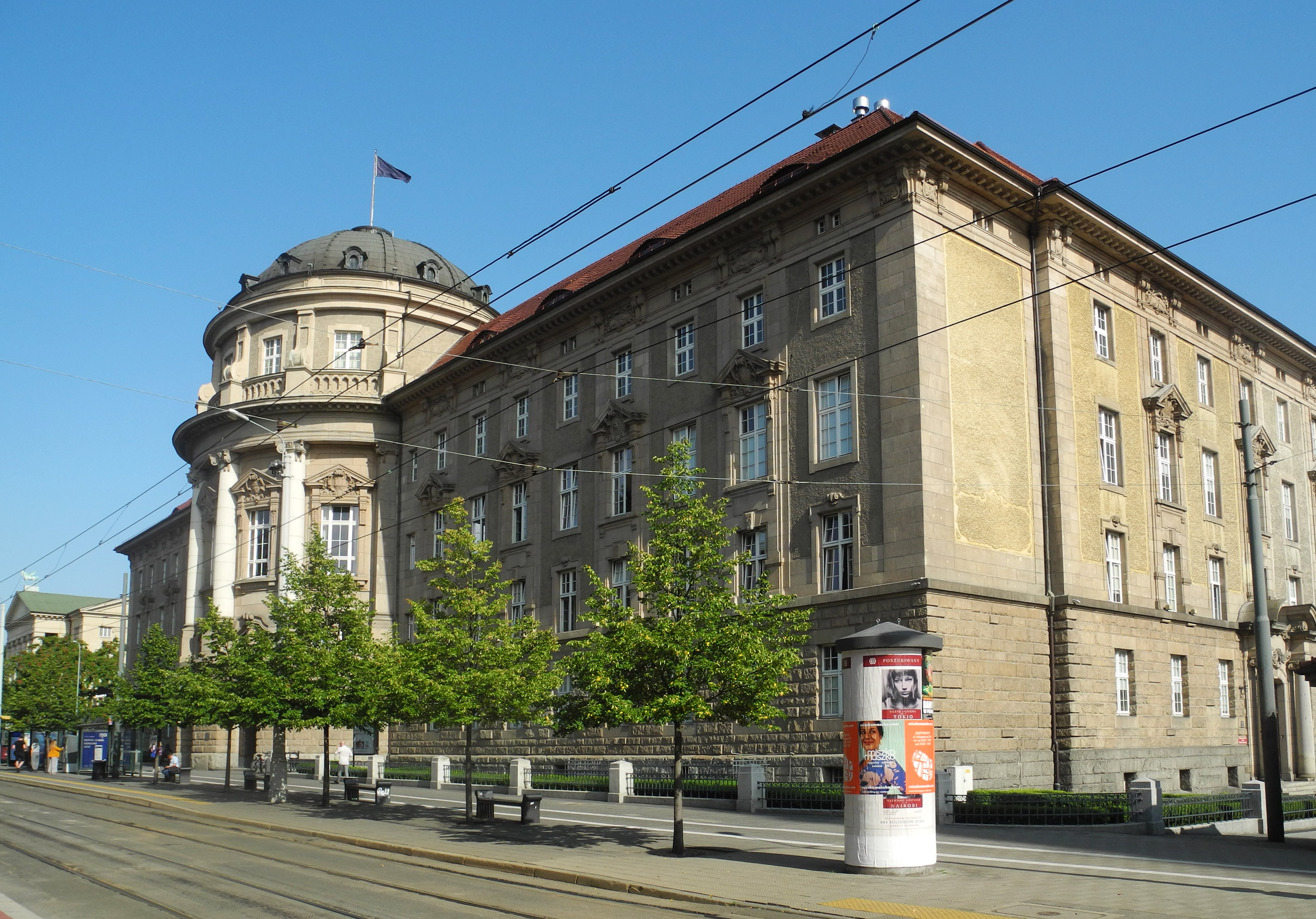
Collegium Maius in Poznań

While advanced research at the university is carried out in virtually every field of modern medicine, its contribution is most widely recognized in such disciplines as immunology, endocrinology, oncology, nuclear medicine, anaesthesiology, surgery, nephrology, gynaecology and obstetrics (especially perinatology), ecology, parasitic and tropical diseases, AIDS, viral hepatitis, hematology, child oncology, cytophysiology and cytopathology, development of the central nervous system, immunology of skin diseases, clinical pharmacology, genetics, audiology, phoniatrics and optometry.

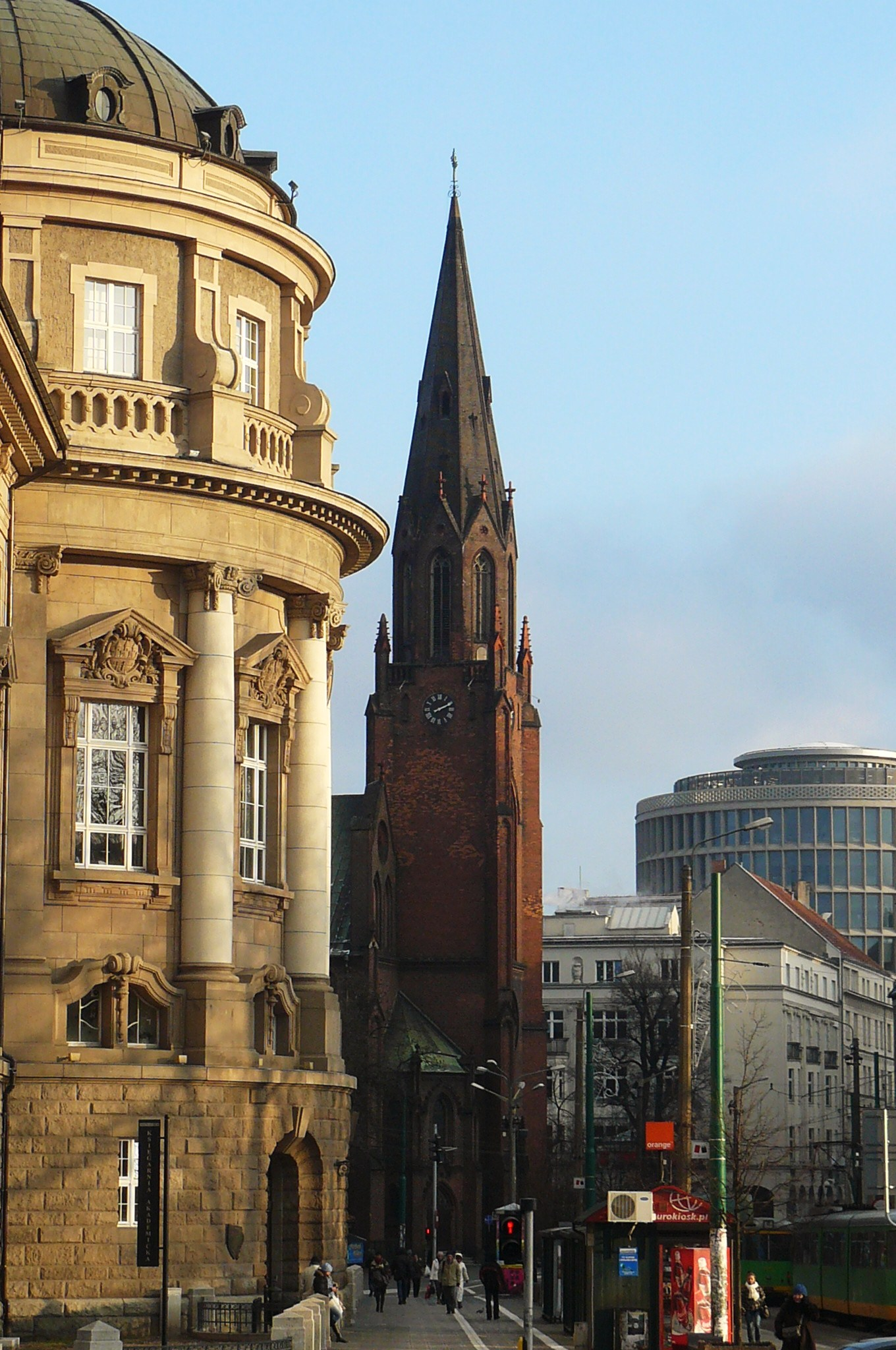
Collegium Maius

The major research topics in the Faculty of Pharmacy are the stability of drugs, pharmacokinetics and biochemistry, the synthesis and analysis of new therapeutic agents, phytochemistry, toxicology and pharmacology.

The fields of research activity of the Faculty of Health Sciences are health promotion, nursing processes and standards in nursing activity.

The investigations conducted at the university are presented in several hundred research papers published yearly in professional journals.

The university hosts between 5 and 10 major international congresses a year and visits of foreign researchers are a daily routine. The university co-operates regularly with universities in Rennes and Rouen (France), Turku (Finland), Berlin, Göttingen, Halle, Kiel, Magdeburg, Mainz, Munchen Regensburg (Germany), Linköping (Sweden), Oslo University College (Norway), Perugia (Italy), University of Illinois at Chicago (USA).

Many university staff members serve on the boards of international professional and scientific associations or are invited to act as advisers by the WHO and IAEA. Lekarsz and Doktor (stopień naukowy) degrees awarded at the university enjoy wide national recognition. In some countries, e.g. Germany, they are accepted with no further confirmation requirements. They are routinely accepted in Sweden, Britain, the United States and Canada. At present more than 1200 graduates of the university practice or research abroad. Many of them are clinical specialists and heads of hospital departments in Europe, North America, South Africa and elsewhere.

Scientific research constitutes a significant part of Medical University activity. The scope of scientific research conducted by the university ranges in solving problems of basic medical and clinical studies. There are also research studies to find and discover new pharmaceutical agents. The university develops scientific and educational collaboration within agreements and official contracts with the following Universities (updated on December 1, 2006):

1. Freie Universität, Berlin (Germany)
2. Friedrich-Alexander-Universität Erlangen-Nürnberg (Germany)
3. Martin-Luther-Universität Halle-Wittenberg (Germany)
4. Christian-Albrechts-Universität zu Kiel, Kiel (Germany)
5. Johannes-Gutenberg Universität, Mainz (Germany)
6. Universität Regensburg (Germany)
7. Université de Rennes 1, Rennes (France)
8. Université Henri-Poincaré, Nancy (France)
9. Universita degli Studi di Perugia (Italy)
10. University of Edinburgh (United Kingdom)
11. Høgskolen i Agder (University of Agder) (Norway)
12. Høgskolen i Oslo (Oslo College) (Norway)
13. Linköpings Universitet (Sweden)
14. Université de Genève (Switzerland)
15. Grodno State Medical University, Grodno (Belarus)
16. Medical University, Vitebsk (Belarus)
17. National University of Pharmacy, Kharkiv (Ukraine)
18. Danylo Halytsky Lviv National Medical University (Ukraine)
19. State Medical and Pharmaceutical University Nicolae Testemitanu, Chișinău (Moldova)
20. Zhong Shang Da Xue (Sun Yat-sen University) (China)
21. Nara Joshi Daigaku (Nara Women's University) (Japan)
22. Divine Word University, Madang (Papua New Guinea)
23. Kaohsiung Medical University, Kaohsiung (Taiwan)
24. Baltimore College of Dental Surgery (United States)
25. Indiana University Bloomington (USA)
26. University of Illinois at Chicago, (USA)
27. Widener University, Chester Pennsylvania (USA)
28. University of Pennsylvania School of Medicine (USA)
29. Illinois College of Optometry, Chicago (USA)

== School Authorities ==
- President: Prof. Jacek Wysocki
- Vice-President for Science and International Relations: Prof. Zenon Kokot
- Vice-President for Clinical Affairs and Postgraduate Studies: Prof. Grzegorz Oszkinis
- Vice-President for Student Affairs: Assoc. Prof. Mariusz Puszczewicz

== Faculties ==
- Faculty of Medicine I
- Faculty of Medicine II (English Language Programs)

- Faculty of Medicine II North American Admissions and Financial Aid

- Faculty of Pharmacy
- Faculty of Health Sciences

== Clinical Hospitals ==
University teaching and research mainly based on co-operation with five Clinical Hospitals and also on the other city and voivodship hospitals

- Official site of Clinical Hospital No. 1
- Official site of Clinical Hospital No. 2
- Official site of Clinical Hospital No. 3
- Official site of Clinical Hospital No. 4
- Official site of Clinical Hospital No. 5

== Alumni ==
- Andrzej Grzybowski, ophthalmologist, academic, medical researcher, and medical journal editor
- Maria Siemionow received both her MD and PhD from Poznan. She is a surgeon at the Cleveland Clinic who gained public notice in December 2008 when she led a team of six surgeons in a 22-hour surgery, performing the first face transplant in the United States on patient Connie Culp.
- Radek Bukowski, doctor, academic physician, scientist and an inventor.
