= Eduardo D. Rodriguez =

American physician

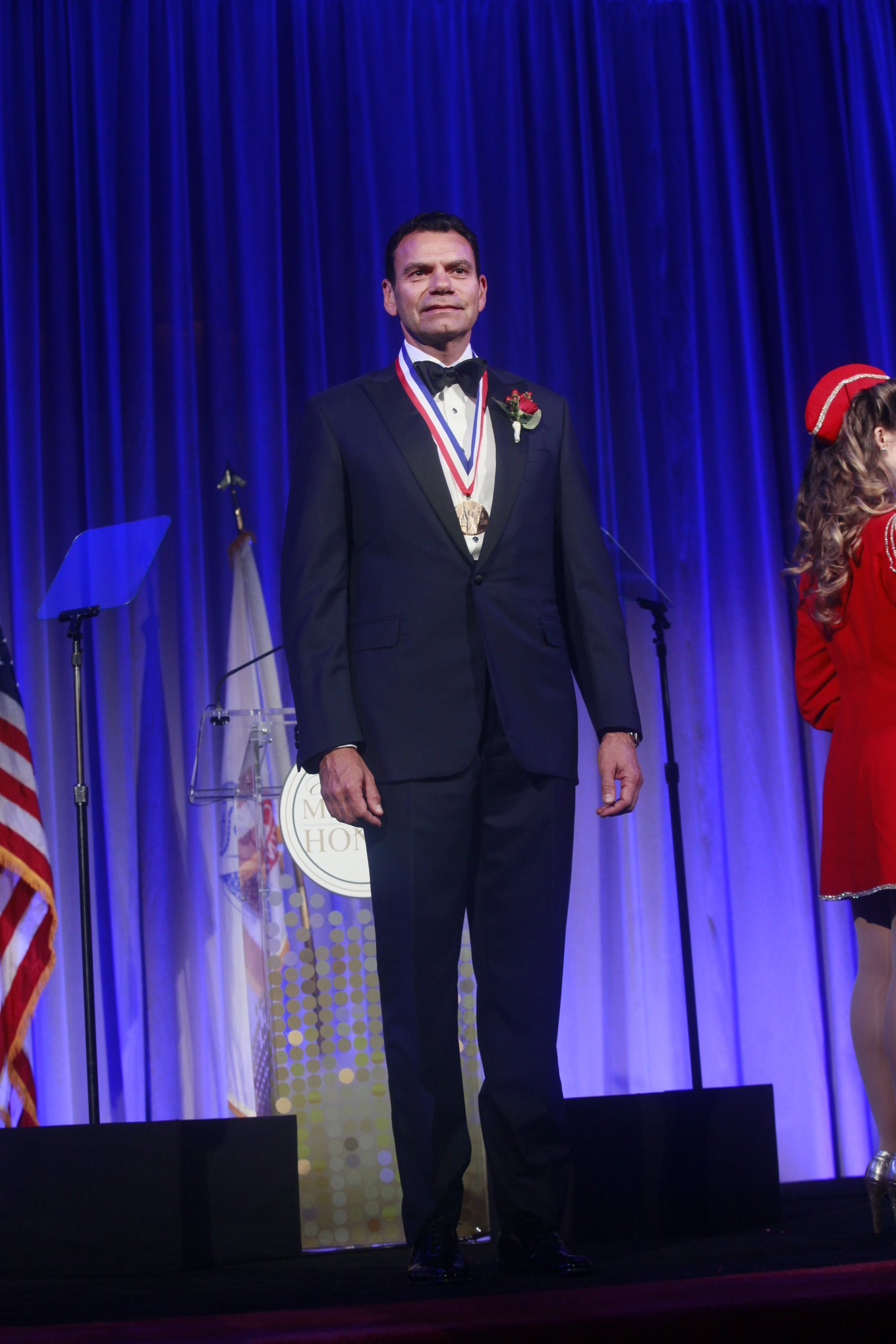
- Rodriguez in 2018
- Born: October 13, 1966 (age 60); Miami, Florida, U.S.
- Education: University of Florida; New York University College of Dentistry; Virginia Commonwealth University
- Occupations: Oral & Maxillofacial surgeon, Plastic & Reconstructive surgeon
- Known for: Facial transplantation
- Title: Chair of the Hansjörg Wyss Department of Plastic Surgery at NYU Langone Health
- Predecessor: Joseph G McCarthy
- Spouse: Ana Maria Rodriguez

Eduardo De Jesus Rodriguez MD, DDS (born October 13, 1966) is a Cuban American oral and maxillofacial surgeon, plastic and reconstructive surgeon, and reconstructive transplant surgeon who is known for his contributions to the fields of facial transplantation and vascularized composite allotransplantation.

Rodriguez practiced in Baltimore until 2013 when he was appointed the Helen L. Kimmel Professor of Reconstructive Plastic Surgery and Chair of the Hansjörg Wyss Department of Plastic Surgery at NYU Langone Health, where he serves as the director of the Face Transplant Program. On August 12, 2020, he led the team that performed the first simultaneous face and double hand transplantation, on recipient Joe Dimeo, a 22-year-old man who suffered full-thickness burns to over 80% of his body after a high-speed car accident in 2018.

== Early life and education ==
Rodriguez was raised in Miami, Florida, in a family of Cuban immigrants. He attended Belen Jesuit Preparatory School, graduating in 1984. He went on to earn his Bachelor of Science in Neurobiology in 1988 from the University of Florida in Gainesville, FL. He initially pursued a career in dentistry, earning a DDS from New York University College of Dentistry in 1992. He then completed residency training in Oral & Maxillofacial Surgery at Montefiore Einstein Medical Center in the Bronx, NY, in 1997. During residency training, the program director at Jacobi Medical Center suggested Rodriguez pursue further medical training to expand his scope. Rodriguez went on to receive his medical degree from Virginia Commonwealth University, Richmond, VA, in 1999. After that, he was accepted into the combined Plastic Surgery residency program at Johns Hopkins Hospital/University of Maryland Medical Center. Rodriguez went on to complete an International Reconstructive Microsurgery Fellowship at Chang Gung Memorial Hospital in Taipei, Taiwan, in 2004.

== Career ==
Rodriguez was introduced to the concept of facial transplantation at a medical conference during his final year of training, where Dr. Maria Siemionow, a Polish transplant surgeon and scientist, presented her experience transplanting the faces of brown rats to white rats. After completing a fellowship in Taiwan, Rodriguez returned to Baltimore, where he conducted large animal studies funded by a grant from the Office of Naval Research before proceeding with clinical trials in humans.

After completing his postgraduate training, Rodriguez returned to Baltimore, intending to help wounded soldiers. The U.S. Department of Defense expressed interest in funding studies in facial transplantation. Rodriguez used a large animal model to establish a proof of concept for facial transplantation as part of an Office of Naval Research Grant that aimed to provide technical support for clinical trials in humans.

In March 2012, he led a team of approximately 150 medical experts to perform what was called the "most extensive face transplant" at the time, a procedure that required 36 hours in the operating room. The recipient was 37-year-old Richard Norris, who had suffered a facial gunshot injury in 1997. The transplant included the skin of the donor’s entire face and anterior neck, the upper and lower jaws, teeth, and tongue. In 2013, Rodriguez was named the inaugural Paul N. Manson, MD Distinguished Professor in Plastic and Reconstructive Surgery.

In 2013, Rodriguez began work at NYU Langone Health as the Chair of the Hansjörg Wyss Department of Plastic Surgery. On August 15, 2015, Rodriguez led a surgical team of more than 100 medical professionals to perform an extensive face transplant in a 41-year-old retired firefighter Patrick Hardison. The patient received the face of David Rodebaugh, who died after a cycling accident.

On January 5, 2018, Rodriguez again led a surgical team from NYU Langone Health to perform the institution’s second face transplant. The recipient was 24-year-old Cameron Underwood of Yuba City, California, who suffered a self-inflicted facial gunshot wound in June 2016. As a result of the initial injury and despite several attempts at conventional reconstruction, Underwood still missed most of his lower jaw, all but one tooth, and his nose. He also suffered damage to the maxillary region (upper face) and palate, severely impairing his ability to eat, speak, and lead a normal life. The surgery took approximately 25 hours and involved the transfer of the donor’s facial skin below the eyes, the entire nose, both jaws, and teeth.

On August 12, 2020, Rodriguez led a team of over 140 personnel in successfully transplanting the face and both hands of a brain-dead donor onto 22-year-old Joseph Dimeo. In June 2018, Dimeo suffered full-thickness burns to over 80% of his body after a high-speed car accident, leaving him severely disfigured and incapable of independently performing many basic activities of daily living. The transplant procedure lasted approximately 23 hours and involved the replacement of the entire facial soft tissue (extending from the anterior hairline to the neck, including the eyelids, nose, lips, and ears, along with strategic skeletal components), as well as both hands at the distal forearm level.

On May 27, 2023, Rodriguez performed the world’s first transplant of an entire eye, in a 21-hour-surgery which involved removing part of the face and the whole left eye of a donor and grafting them onto the recipient, 46-year-old Aaron James.

== Awards ==
In 2018, Rodriguez was awarded the Ellis Island Medal of Honor which recognizes individuals with ethnic heritage that promoted significant contributions to American society. The Maryland Hispanic Chamber of Commerce and the Education Based Latino Outreach established “The Dr. Eduardo Rodriguez Science & Robotics Academy” in his honor.

== Bibliography ==
Rodriguez has authored over 250 scientific publications.

== Personal life ==
Rodriguez has been married to Ana Maria Rodriguez since 1997 or 1998, and they live in New York City.
