= Peter J. Taub =

American surgeon

- Born: 1967 (age 58–59); New York City
- Education: Brown University; Albert Einstein College of Medicine
- Medical career
- Profession: Surgeon
- Institutions: Mount Sinai Medical Center
- Research: Plastic and reconstructive surgery

Peter James Taub is an American professor of surgery, pediatrics, dentistry, neurosurgery, and medical education at the Icahn School of Medicine at Mount Sinai as well as Attending Plastic and Reconstructive Surgeon at the Mount Sinai Medical Center and Elmhurst Hospital Center, all in New York City. He is a diplomate of both the American Board of Surgery and the American Board of Plastic Surgery.

Taub currently serves as the System Chief for the Division of Plastic and Reconstructive Surgery across the Mount Sinai Health System, as well as the Chief of Craniomaxillofacial Surgery across the Mount Sinai Health System and the Chief of Pediatric Plastic Surgery at the Kravis Children's Hospital where he directs the Cleft & Craniofacial Center and the Vascular Anomalies Program.

Taub has served as Chair of the New York Regional Society of Plastic Surgeons, the Northeastern Society of Plastic Surgeons, the American Association of Pediatric Plastic Surgeons, and the American Society of Maxillofacial Surgeons. He is currently an elected Member of the American Board of Plastic Surgeons.

== Biography ==
Taub was born and raised in New York City. He received his A.B. degree in biology at Brown University in Providence, Rhode Island in 1989 and received his M.D. with honors for research in Plastic and Reconstructive Surgery at Albert Einstein College of Medicine in New York City in 1993. His postdoctoral training included an internship and subsequent residency in general surgery at the Mount Sinai School of Medicine, a residency in plastic and reconstructive surgery, and a fellowship in craniofacial surgery, at the U.C.L.A. School of Medicine in Los Angeles.

Taub's research concentrates on craniofacial anomalies and the mechanisms of tendon healing, as well as an examination of the worldwide database of cleft surgery.

At the Mount Sinai Medical Center, he serves as the program director for the Plastic Surgery Residency Training Program and as the medical director for the Ambulatory Surgery Center. He also serves on the Boards of the Northeastern Society of Plastic Surgery the New York Regional Society of Plastic Surgery, as well as the Plastic Surgery Research Council. Internationally, Taub is an operating member of the Board of Directors of KomedyPlast, a not-for-profit organization that offers surgery for children with craniofacial anomalies.

Taub is currently a reviewer for 6 journals, including Plastic and Reconstructive Surgery, Annals of Plastic Surgery, Cleft Palate/Craniofacial Journal, Tissue Engineering, Journal of Pediatric Surgery and Pediatrics, as well as the associate editor, Head and Neck section, of the Annals of Plastic Surgery.

== Grants ==
Role	Title	Funding Source/Identifier
Principal Investigator	Using Stem Cells to Regenerate Rat Calvarium	New York Medical College Internal Research Grant
Principal Investigator	CITED-2 in Osteogenesis: An in vivo study	American Society of Maxillofacial Surgeons
Co-Investigator	Nonsyndromic Sagittal and Coronal Synostosis	National Institutes of Health RFA-DD-10-001

== Professional affiliations ==
Taub is affiliated with Alpha Omega Alpha.

He is also a member of the American Council of Academic Plastic Surgeons (ACAPS). He also serves as vice president, Northeastern Society of Plastic Surgeons (NESPS).

== Honors ==
- First place Clinical Research Award, U.C.L.A. School of Medicine, "Flap Prefabrication with VEGF"; 2000
- First place Research Award, 4th Annual Louis R. M. Del Guercio Surgical Research Day, "Bioengineering of calvaria with adult stem cells"; 2005
- British Medical Association honorable mention for medical textbook, Clinical Problem Solving in Plastic Surgery, 2011

== Books ==
- Taub PJ and Koch RM, Editors. Clinical Problem Solving in Plastic Surgery. New York: McGraw-Hill, Inc., 2009. ISBN 0071481508.
- Taub PJ and Baker SB. Operative Atlas of Rhinoplasty. New York: McGraw-Hill, Inc., 2011. ISBN 0071590498.
- Serletti J, Taub PJ, Wu L, Slutsky D, Editors. Current Reconstructive Surgery. New York: McGraw-Hill, Inc., 2012. ISBN 0071477233.
- Taub PJ and King TW, Editors. Pediatric Plastic and Reconstructive Surgery for Primary Care. American Academy of Pediatrics. 2020. ISBN 1610023943.

== Select Publications ==
- Justice CM, Yagnik G, Kim Y, Peter I, Jabs EW, Erazo M, Ye X, Ainehsazan E, Shi L, Cunningham ML, Kimonis V, Roscioli T, Wall SA, Wilkie AO, Stoler J, Richtsmeier JT, Heuzé Y, Sanchez-Lara PA, Buckley MF, Druschel CM, Mills JL, Caggana M, Romitti PA, Kay DM, Senders C, Taub PJ, Klein OD, Boggan J, Zwienenberg-Lee M, Naydenov C, Kim J, Wilson AF, Boyadjiev SA. A genome-wide association study identifies susceptibility loci for nonsyndromic sagittal craniosynostosis near BMP2 and within BBS9. Nat Genet. 2012 Dec;44(12):1360-4. doi: 10.1038/ng.2463. Epub 2012 Nov 18. PMID 23160099.
- Tan PW, Patel AS, Taub PJ, Lampert JA, Xipoleas G, Santiago GF, Silver L, Sheriff HO, Lin TS, Cooter R, Diogo F, Salazaard B, Kim BJ, Lee YH, Ogawa R. Cultural perspectives in facial allotransplantation. Eplasty. 2012;12:e39. Epub 2012 Aug 23. PMID 22977674.
- Addona T, Friedman A, Post A, Weiss N, Silver L, Taub PJ. Complete calvarial agenesis in conjunction with a tessier 1-13 facial cleft. Cleft Palate Craniofac J. 2012 Jul;49(4):484-7. doi: 10.1597/08-232. PMID 22839097.
- Taub PJ, Wolfeld M, Cohen-Pfeffer J, Mehta L. Mandibular distraction in the setting of chromosome 4q deletion. J Plast Reconstr Aesthet Surg. 2012 Apr;65(4):e95-8. doi: 10.1016/j.bjps.2011.11.031. Epub 2011 Dec 9. PMID 22154942.
- Addona T, Friedman A, Post A, Weiss N, Silver L, Taub PJ. Complete Calvarial Agenesis in Conjunction with a Tessier 1-13 Facial Cleft. Cleft Palate Craniofac J. 2012; PMID 22839097.
- Taub PJ, Lampert JA. Pediatric craniofacial surgery: a review for the multidisciplinary team. Cleft Palate Craniofac J. 2011 Nov;48(6):670-83. doi: 10.1597/08-051. Epub 2011 Jul 8. PubMed PMID 21740182.
- Nikfarjam J, Taub PJ, Patel A, Rose E. Arteriovenous fistula following radial forearm free flap. J Reconstr Microsurg. 2011 Jun;27(5):295-8. doi: 10.1055/s-0031-1278706. Epub 2011 May 18. PMID 21594811.
- Lee JY, Zhou Z, Taub PJ, Ramcharan M, Li Y, Akinbiyi T, Maharam ER, Leong DJ, Laudier DM, Ruike T, Torina PJ, Zaidi M, Majeska RJ, Schaffler MB, Flatow EL, Sun HB. BMP-12 treatment of adult mesenchymal stem cells in vitro augments tendon-like tissue formation and defect repair in vivo. PLoS One. 2011 Mar 11;6(3):e17531. doi: 10.1371/journal.pone.0017531. PMID 21412429.
- Lee JY, Taub PJ, Wang L, Clark A, Zhu LL, Maharam ER, Leong DJ, Ramcharan M, Li Z, Liu Z, Ma YZ, Sun L, Zaidi M, Majeska RJ, Sun HB. Identification of CITED2 as a negative regulator of fracture healing. Biochem Biophys Res Commun. 2009 Oct 2;387(4):641-5. doi: 10.1016/j.bbrc.2009.07.029. Epub 2009 Jul 14. PMID 19607804.
- Lipper J, Pazkowski J, Taub PJ. Purtscher's retinopathy as a cause of postoperative blindness. Plast Reconstr Surg. 2008 Aug;122(2):68e-9e. doi: 10.1097/PRS.0b013e31817d5f27. PMID 18626320.
- Lipper J, Weinstein DA, Taub PJ. Perioperative management of patients with glycogen storage disease type Ia. Plast Reconstr Surg. 2008 Jul;122(1):42e-43e. doi: 10.1097/PRS.0b013e31817746da. PMID 18594376.
- Taub PJ, Narayan P. Surgical navigation technology for treatment of pneumosinus dilatans. Cleft Palate Craniofac J. 2007 Sep;44(5):562-6. doi:10.1597/06-144.1 PMID 17760490.
- Taub PJ, Lin H, Silver L. Mandibular distraction for amniotic band syndrome in the neonate. Ann Plast Surg. 2007 Sep;59(3):334-7. doi:10.1097/01.sap.0000252771.42869.b2 PMID 17721226.
