= James Maki =

James Maki may refer to:

- James Maki, a pseudonym of Japanese film director Yasujirō Ozu (1903–1963)
- James Maki, the second person in the United States, and first American male, to undergo a partial-face transplant in 2009
