= Isabelle Dinoire =

Partial face transplant recipient (1967–2016)

- Born: 3 February 1967; Maubeuge
- Died: 22 April 2016 (aged 49); Amiens
- Known for: First partial face transplant

Isabelle Dinoire (3 February 1967 – 22 April 2016) was a French woman who was the first person to undergo a partial face transplant, after her pet dog severely injured her face while she was passed out from an overdose of sleeping pills in May 2005. She underwent a 15-hour operation in November 2005 in which surgeons transplanted the nose, lips and chin from a brain-dead donor at a hospital in Amiens. She died at age 49 in April 2016, though her death was not announced until more than four months later.

== Personal life ==
Dinoire lived in Valenciennes, northern France, and she was the mother of two children.

== Mutilation incident ==
Dinoire took a large number of sleeping pills and neither woke up nor felt any pain while her pet dog mutilated her face. When she woke up it took her a while to realize what had happened. Dinoire's injuries affected her nose, lips, chin, and cheeks. In a statement made on 6 February 2006, Dinoire said that "after a very upsetting week, with many personal problems, I took some pills to forget ... I fainted and fell on the ground, hitting a piece of furniture."

Some reports following the initial surgery claim that her daughter said that the black cross of a Labrador and a Beauceron named Tania was "frantically" trying to wake Dinoire after she took sleeping pills in a suicide attempt, and that Dinoire wrote about her suicidal feelings in her own memoir. The hospital denied this, saying that she said she had taken a pill to go to sleep after a family argument and was bitten by her dog during the night.

Dinoire's daughter reported that the family is sure that the dog, which was euthanized, mutilated Dinoire while attempting to wake her. They believe that the damage was caused when the dog, finding that Dinoire would not wake up, got more and more frantic, and began scratching and clawing her. Dinoire was "heartbroken" when Tania was euthanized and kept a picture of the dog by her hospital bed; she later adopted a different dog to aid in her recovery after surgery.

Doctors and the media debated whether either or both of the donor and the recipient had attempted suicide, with reports stating that the donor had hanged herself. The family of the donor told the funeral director who handled the donor's death that it had been accidental. Local French newspapers reported that Dinoire's daughter said that her mother had attempted suicide. Dubernard said that the recipient had not tried to kill herself. Olivier Jardé, an orthopedic surgeon from Amiens and a member of the French National Assembly, said that both the donor and the recipient had attempted suicide. British newspaper The Sunday Times stated that Dinoire had said in a telephone interview that she had tried to commit suicide. In her 2007 memoir, Dinoire stated that the donor had killed herself, and this "gave Dinoire a feeling of sisterhood" with her.

== Premortem animal depredating injury ==
What happened to Dinoire is described in medical literature as premortem animal depredating injury, a rare case of domestic animal depredation that can happen to people in a state of deep unconsciousness. This is a phenomenon similar to post mortem animal depredating injury. There are several theories as to why pets start to mutilate their owners. Attempts to wake the owner up that escalate, displacement behavior resulting from the atypical human behavior and starvation are 3 possible reasons mentioned in scientific papers. It is typical that unclothed areas are affected first. In such cases, the mutilation of the face is described as extensive, including removal of facial features and the scalp.

== Partial face transplant ==
The first partial face transplant surgery on a living human was performed on Dinoire on 27 November 2005 by Bernard Devauchelle, assisted by Jean-Michel Dubernard at the Centre hospitalier Universitaire Nord in Amiens, France. A triangle of face tissue, including the nose and mouth, was taken from a brain-dead female donor and grafted onto the patient. Scientists elsewhere had performed scalp and ear transplants, but the claim was the first for the transplant of a mouth and nose, the most difficult parts of the face to transplant. Dinoire was also given bone marrow cells to prevent rejection of the tissue. According to The Times, she had signed a contract with British documentary maker Michael Hughes before the operation.

== Recovery ==
In 2009, Dinoire's doctors reported she was recovering well. Exactly one year following the partial face transplant, Dinoire stated she had the ability to smile again. On 28 November 2006, Dinoire's surgeon, Bernard Devauchelle, said that over the past year Dinoire's scars had become far less prominent.

There was a change in her appearance, as her original face had a wide, tilted nose, a prominent chin and thin lips, but the donated face gave her a straight and narrow nose, a smaller chin and a fuller mouth. In 2008, Dinoire admitted in an interview that she sometimes struggled to accept the appearance of her transplanted face, as she had expected it to look more like her own, saying: "It takes an awful lot of time to get used to someone else's face." In the same interview, she reported that full sensitivity had returned to her face.

The Associated Press released a picture of Dinoire on 28 November 2006, one year after the operation. The French newspaper Le Monde's website explained on 2 December 2006 that the Associated Press had eliminated the picture, because "The hair of Isabelle Dinoire and the background of this image were manipulated by the source."

On the second anniversary of the operation, her doctors published an article in the New England Journal of Medicine detailing her operation and recovery. Complications have included kidney failure and two episodes of tissue rejection (one after one month and one after one year), which have been suppressed by drugs. Dinoire had to take the drugs for the rest of her life. A Boston doctor said if she stopped taking drugs, her scenario would be a "disaster", with the new face sloughing off over time. Part of her pre-operative screening included psychological evaluations to ensure she would be capable of maintaining her treatment regimen and also could accept and withstand the effects of having a dead person's face grafted onto her own.

== Illness and death ==
Dinoire died of cancer at a French hospital in April 2016. Her death was not announced until September 2016 to give her family privacy, according to hospital officials. According to newspaper Le Figaro, Dinoire's body had rejected the transplant in 2015 "and she had lost part of the use of her lips." The daily immunosuppressive drugs she was required to take left her vulnerable to cancer. Two cancers had developed, the paper said.

== See also ==
- Connie Culp
- Dallas Wiens
- Bohdan Pomahač
