= Jean-Michel Dubernard =

French medical doctor and politician (1941–2021)

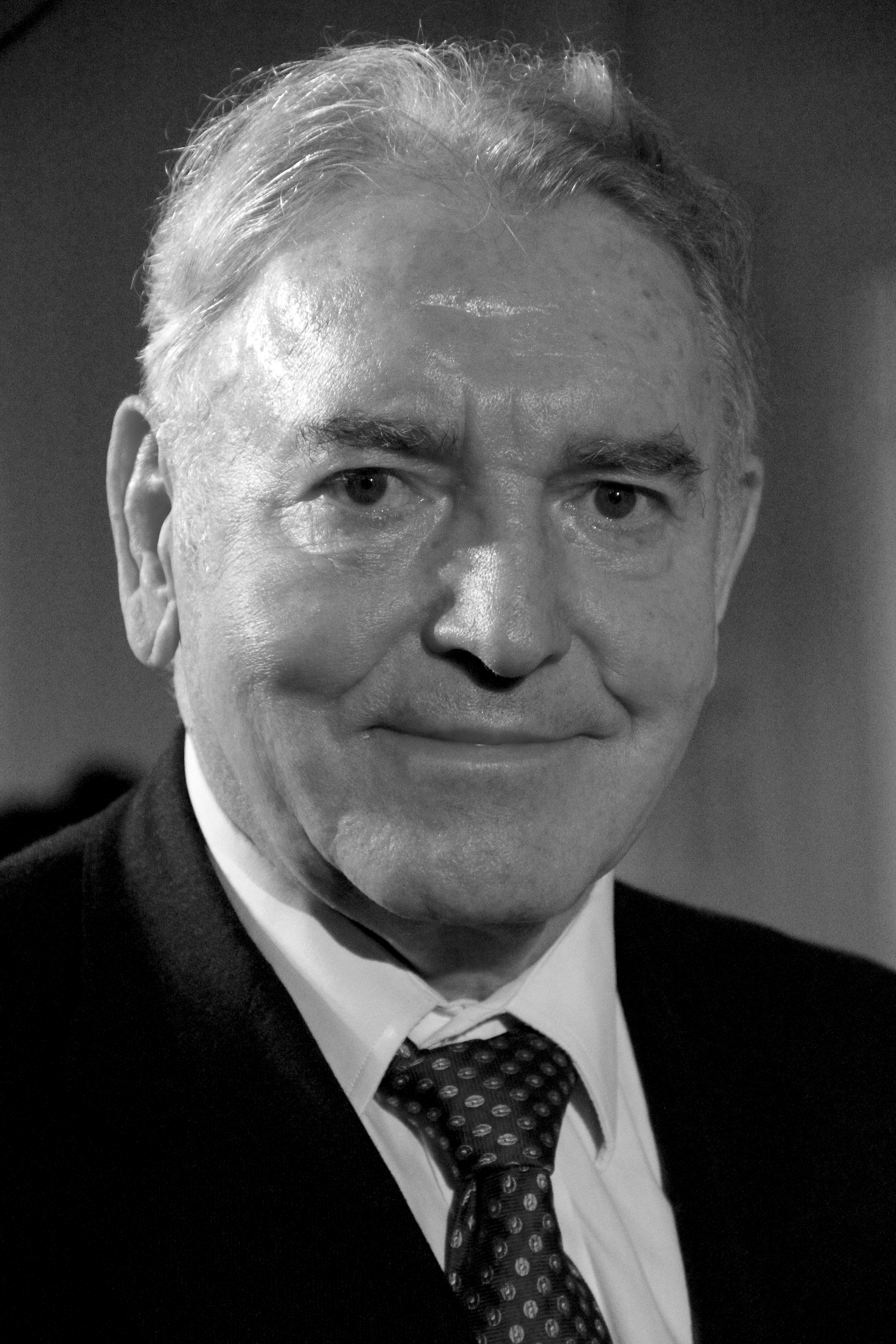
- Dubernard in 2013

Member of the National Assembly for Rhône's 3rd constituency
- In office 2 April 1986 – 19 June 2007
- Preceded by: Michel Noir
- Succeeded by: Jean-Louis Touraine

Personal details
- Born: 17 May 1941 Lyon, France
- Died: 10 July 2021 (aged 80) Istanbul, Turkey
- Party: The Republicans
- Occupation: Surgeon

Jean-Michel Dubernard (French: [dybɛʁnaʁ]; 17 May 1941 – 10 July 2021) was a French medical doctor specializing in transplant surgery who served as a Deputy in the French National Assembly. He was born in Lyon.

Dr. Dubernard was most famous for performing the first successful hand transplant on Clint Hallam on 23 September 1998, the first successful double hand transplant shortly thereafter (but not announced until 14 January 2004), and assisting Prof. Bernard Devauchelle in performing the first partial face transplant on Isabelle Dinoire on 27 November 2005. Dubernard was elected to the American Philosophical Society in 2010. Dubernard died at Istanbul Airport on 10 July 2021 at the age of 80.

== Sources ==
- www.handtransplant.org
- "A Pioneering Transplant, and Now an Ethical Storm". New York Times. 6 December 2005.
- "Dire Wounds, a New Face, a Glimpse in a Mirror". New York Times. 3 December 2005.
