= Peter Butler (surgeon) =

English plastic surgeon

- Born: Peter Edward Michael Butler; 1 September 1962 (age 63); Ireland
- Occupation(s): Surgeon, scientist
- Employer(s): Royal Free London NHS Foundation Trust, London, United Kingdom
- Title: Professor of plastic and reconstructive surgery

Peter Edward Michael Butler, FRCSI, FRCS, FRCS (Plast) (born 1 September 1962) is Professor of Plastic and Reconstructive Surgery at University College London. He is consultant plastic surgeon and head of the face transplantation team at the Royal Free London NHS Foundation Trust in London, United Kingdom. He is Director of the Charles Wolfson Center for Reconstructive Surgery at the Royal Free Hospital, which was launched by George Osborne, Chancellor of the Exchequer at No 11 Downing Street in November 2013.

== Education and training ==
Butler is a graduate of the Royal College of Surgeons in Ireland and Physicians of Ireland. He trained in Dublin, Massachusetts General Hospital, Harvard Medical School and London. He is a fellow of the Royal College of Surgeons in Ireland (FRCS) and the Royal College of Surgeons of England (FRCS). He began his main research interests at the Massachusetts General Hospital and Harvard Medical School. He began his work in 1993 with Andrew Lee and David Sachs in reconstructive transplantation, and with Charles Vacanti, Jay Vacanti and Robert Langer in tissue engineering.

Butler has an active clinical and laboratory based research program. One of his main areas of research is facial transplantation. The work he has been involved in has received awards from the New England Society of Plastic and Reconstructive Surgeons, the American Society of Plastic and Reconstructive Surgeons, the Plastic Surgery Research Council, USA, the British Association of Plastic Surgeons and Society of Academic & Research Surgery.

== Face transplantation, tissue engineering and stem cell research ==
Butler began the experimental work leading towards facial transplantation in 1993 at the Massachusetts General Hospital and Harvard Medical School. This work continues today. On returning to the UK he set up one of the world's first clinical research programmes in facial transplantation in 2002. Two other teams existed at that time, at Louisville, Kentucky, US, and at the Cleveland Clinic, Ohio, US. In 2004 a team led by Dr. Maria Siemionow at the Cleveland Clinic became the first institution to approve this surgery. There was considerable resistance to facial transplantation taking place in the UK.

In October 2006, after overcoming significant ethical hurdles Butler's team received permission from the North London Research Ethics Committee to go ahead with a series of four full face transplant operations to be carried out at the Royal Free Hospital. Some news outlets speculated at the time that their team was likely to be the first to perform such a transplant. However, Butler stated in a 27 October press release that their team "will not be rushed" and "It may be some time before we are ready to carry out an operation." The costs of the operation is funded by a charity, the Face Trust, set up by Butler in 2006. Patient selection for facial transplantation is ongoing. It has been reported by Butler that there has been significant difficulty in obtaining facial tissue donation in the UK but with more facial transplants performed worldwide that it may become more acceptable in the UK in the future.

Butler began his research in tissue engineering in 1993 at the Massachusetts General Hospital and Harvard Medical School with Charles Vacanti, Jay Vacant and Robert Langer. He has pursued many technologies as an alternative to transplantation to replace facial tissue. This forms a significant part of his present research work. This work has received awards from the Plastic Surgery Research Council, US, the British Association of Plastic Surgeons and Society of Academic & Research Surgery. His other area of research interest is therapeutic stem cell in the treatment of fibrosis. He has the biggest worldwide treatment numbers for oro-facial fibrosis secondary to scleroderma and other rare diseases. This work has been awarded prizes by the Royal Society of Medicine and SRUK. Further innovation in the treatment of lichen sclerosus has been awarded prizes by the British Society for the Study of Vulval Diseases. This work is carried out as part of the newly formed Charles Wolfson Centre of Reconstructive Surgery.

== Personal life ==
Butler was married to Annabel Heseltine from 1998 to 2018. They have four children and divorced in 2018.
