= Rhône's 3rd constituency =

Constituency of the National Assembly of France

3rd constituency of Rhône
- inline Constituency of the National Assembly of France

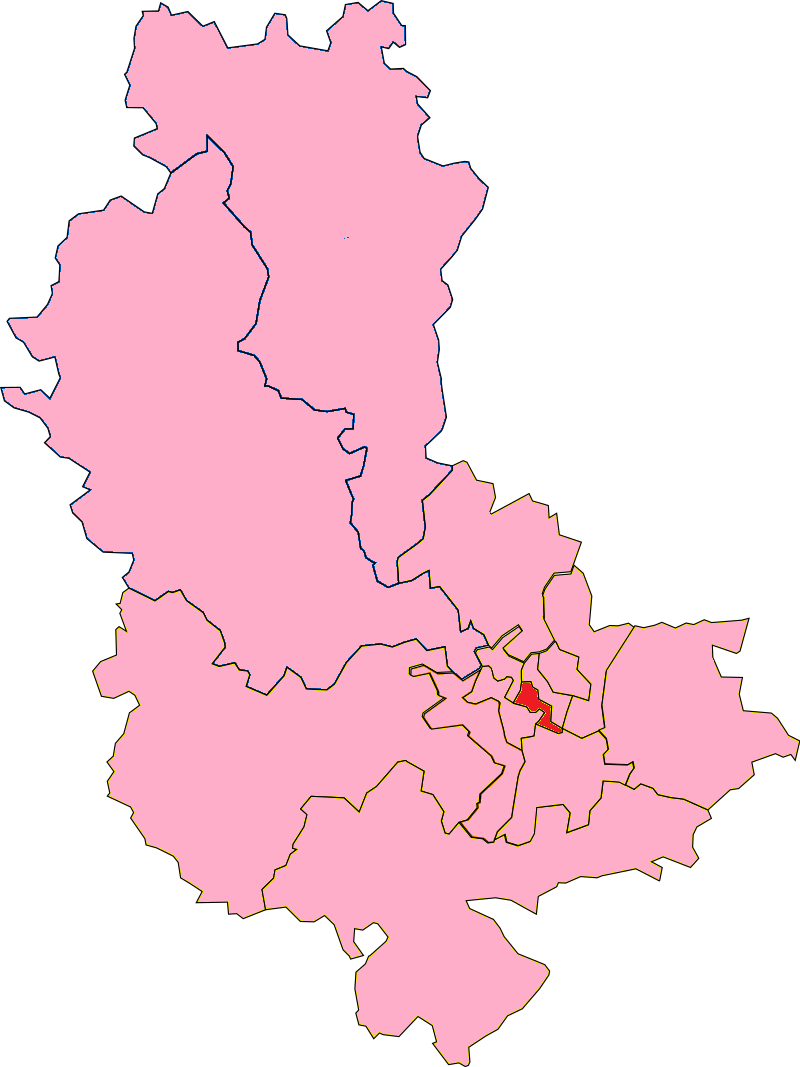
- Rhône's's 3rd Constituency shown within Rhône
- Deputy: Marie-Charlotte Garin; LÉ-EELV
- Department: Rhône
- Cantons: Lyon VIII, Lyon IX, Lyon X [part], Lyon XII [part], Lyon XIV [part]
- Registered voters: 72021

The 3rd constituency of the Rhône (French: Troisième circonscription du Rhône) is a French legislative constituency in the Rhône département. Like the other 576 French constituencies, it elects one MP using a two round electoral system.

== Description ==
The 3rd constituency of the Rhône includes parts of Lyon to the south of the city centre. Since 2015 this constituency has been part of the Lyon Metropolis and therefore outside of the Rhône for administrative purposes.

In common with the neighbouring Rhône's 2nd constituency this seat swung to the left in 2007 after many years of electing conservative deputies. Jean-Louis Touraine retained the constituency in 2017 after switching parties to En Marche! from the Socialist Party.

== Assembly members ==
Election	Member	Party
1988	Jean-Michel Dubernard	RPR
1993	Jean-Michel Dubernard	RPR
1997	Jean-Michel Dubernard	RPR
2002	Jean-Michel Dubernard	UMP
2007	Jean-Louis Touraine	PS
2012	Jean-Louis Touraine	PS
2017	Jean-Louis Touraine	LREM
2022	Marie-Charlotte Garin	EELV
2024	Marie-Charlotte Garin	LÉ-EELV

== Election results ==
=== 2024 ===
Legislative Election 2024: Rhône's 3rd constituency
Party	Candidate	Votes	%	±%
LÉ–EELV (NFP)	Marie-Charlotte Garin	27,736	51.51	+8.15
RE (Ensemble)	Clara Eynaud-Lassalle	11,557	21,46	−7.05
RN	Clotilde Morin	7,938	14.74	−7.46
LR	Béatrice de Montille	4,464	8.29	−0.01
DVE	Eric Lafond	688	1.28	N/A
UDI	Leo Bourret	501	0.93	N/A
REC	Marie Rilly	486	0.90	−3.59
LO	Jean-Noël Dudukdjian	260	0.48	N/A
NPA	Anaïs Barrallon	141	0.26	N/A
DIV	Marc Chinal	71	0.13	N/A
Turnout		53,842	76.02	+16.96
Registered electors		70,822		
LÉ–EELV hold				

=== 2022 ===
Legislative Election 2022: Rhone's 3rd constituency
Party	Candidate	Votes	%	±%
EELV (NUPÉS)	Marie-Charlotte Garin	17,767	43.36	+14.32
LREM (Ensemble)	Sarah Peillon	11,681	28.51	-14.33
LR (UDC)	Béatrice De Montille	3,403	8.30	−4.83
RN	Gérard Vollory	2,983	7.28	+1.13
REC	Olivier Delucenay	1,841	4.49	N/A
PRG	Jean-François Auzal	969	2.36	N/A
Others	N/A	2,332	-	−
Turnout		40,976	57.10	+4.37
2nd round result
EELV (NUPÉS)	Marie-Charlotte Garin	21,105	54.79	+14.64
LREM (Ensemble)	Sarah Peillon	17,416	45.21	−14.64
Turnout		38,521	55.39	+14.57
EELV gain from LREM				

=== 2017 ===
Legislative Election 2017: Rhône's 3rd constituency
Party	Candidate	Votes	%	±%
LREM	Jean-Louis Touraine	16,271	42.84	
LFI	Pascal Le Brun	6,030	15.88	
LR	Nora Berra	4,987	13.13	
EELV	Fanny Dubot	4,204	11.07	
FN	Michel Dulac	2,334	6.15	
PCF	Fanny Lucius	794	2.09	
Others	N/A	3,359		
Turnout		37,979	52.73	
2nd round result
LREM	Jean-Louis Touraine	17,595	59.85	
LFI	Pascal Le Brun	11,805	40.15	
Turnout		29,400	40.82	
LREM gain from PS				

=== 2012 ===
Legislative Election 2012: Rhône's 3rd constituency
Party	Candidate	Votes	%	±%
PS	Jean-Louis Touraine	15,762	40.01	
UMP	Laure Dagorne	10,604	26.92	
FN	Jeanne De Carbonnieres	4,365	11.08	
FG	Eleni Ferlet	2,781	7.06	
EELV	Fanny Dubot	2,420	6.14	
MoDem	Céline Bos	619	2.08	
Others	N/A	2,640		
Turnout		39,391	56.00	
2nd round result
PS	Jean-Louis Touraine	21,425	59.15	
UMP	Laure Dagorne	14,797	40.85	
Turnout		36,222	51.49	
PS hold				

=== 2007 ===
Legislative Election 2007: Rhône's 3rd constituency
Party	Candidate	Votes	%	±%
UMP	Jean-Michel Dubernard	16,241	40.66	
PS	Jean-Louis Touraine	11,131	27.87	
MoDem	Azouz Begag	5,886	14.74	
FN	Liliane Boury	1,697	4.25	
LV	Pascale Bonniel-Chalier	1,376	3.45	
PCF	Karim Helal	957	2.40	
Far left	Françoise Chalons	946	2.37	
Others	N/A	1,707		
Turnout		40,235	59.75	
2nd round result
PS	Jean-Louis Touraine	19,190	51.34	
UMP	Jean-Michel Dubernard	18,186	48.66	
Turnout		38,208	56.74	
PS gain from UMP				

=== 2002 ===
Legislative Election 2002: Rhône's 3rd constituency
Party	Candidate	Votes	%	±%
UMP	Jean-Michel Dubernard	13,904	36.38	
PS	Barbara Romagnan	11,588	30.32	
FN	Patricia Chicard	4,325	11.32	
DVD	Patrick Louis	2,816	7.37	
DVD	Veronique Jouve	1,341	3.51	
PCF	Karim Helal	991	2.59	
Others	N/A	3,252		
Turnout		38,666	67.52	
2nd round result
UMP	Jean-Michel Dubernard	18,487	55.32	
PS	Barbara Romagnan	14,933	44.68	
Turnout		34,453	60.16	
UMP hold				

=== 1997 ===
Legislative Election 1997: Rhône's 3rd constituency
Party	Candidate	Votes	%	±%
RPR	Jean-Michel Dubernard	9,975	28.61	
PS	Jean-Louis Touraine	8,631	24.75	
FN	Liliane Boury	6,210	17.81	
DVD	Marie-Chantal Desbazeille	3,655	10.48	
PCF	Louis Leveque	1,798	5.16	
LO	Françoise Leclet	1,032	2.96	
DVE	Alain Cabanes	760	2.18	
DVD	Alain Domanski	751	2.15	
GE	Emmanuel Raskin	700	2.01	
Others	N/A	1,356		
Turnout		35,946	64.06	
2nd round result
RPR	Jean-Michel Dubernard	20,117	55.54	
PS	Jean-Louis Touraine	16,103	44.46	
Turnout		38,153	67.99	
RPR hold				
