= Jean-Louis Touraine =

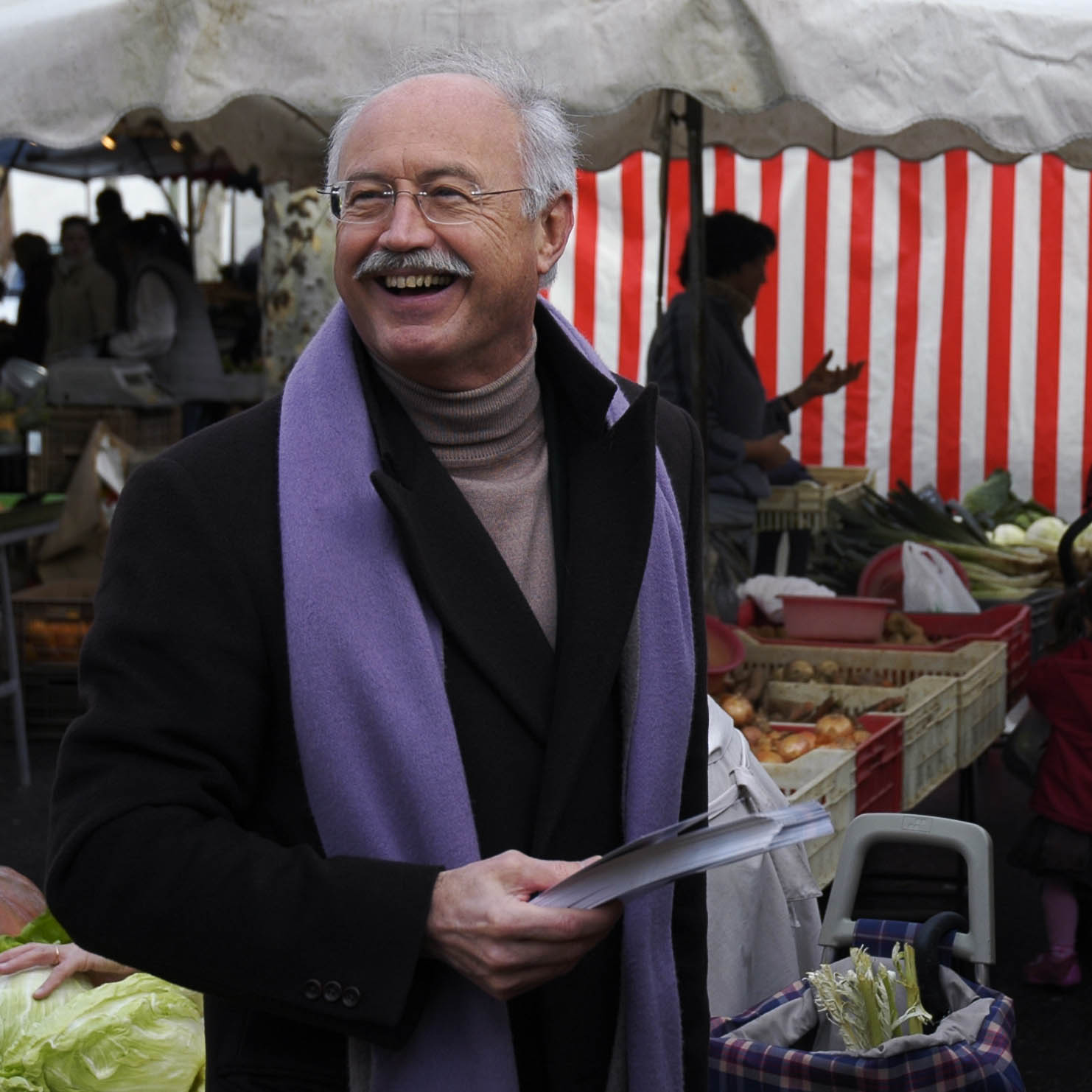

Member of the National Assembly for Rhône's 3rd constituency
- In office 20 June 2007 – 21 June 2022
- Preceded by: Jean-Michel Dubernard
- Succeeded by: Marie-Charlotte Garin

First Deputy Mayor of Lyon
- In office 25 March 2001 – 4 April 2014
- Mayor: Gérard Collomb
- Preceded by: Christian Philip
- Succeeded by: Georges Képénékian

Mayor of the 8th arrondissement of Lyon
- In office 25 June 1995 – 18 March 2001
- Preceded by: Henry Viannay
- Succeeded by: Christian Coulon

General Councillor of Rhône
- In office 29 March 2004 – 15 July 2007
- Preceded by: Henry Viannay
- Succeeded by: Louis Pelaez
- Constituency: 12th Canton of Lyon

Personal details
- Born: 8 October 1945 (age 80) Lyon, France
- Party: La République En Marche! (since 2017)
- Other political affiliations: Socialist Party (until 2017)
- Profession: Professor of medicine

Jean-Louis Touraine (born 8 October 1945) is a French politician and professor of medicine who served as a member of the National Assembly for Rhône's 3rd constituency from 2007 to 2022. He is a member of La République En Marche (LREM).

== Professional career ==
Jean-Louis Touraine is a professor of medicine in the department of organ transplantation and immunology at Claude Bernard University Lyon 1, and is a part-time practitioner at Édouard Herriot Hospital in Lyon. He has also served as president of France Transplant since 1995 and the Centre of Studies of Immunodeficiency and its Relation to Cancer (CEDIC). From 1986 to 1990, Touraine was president of the Inserm Scientific Consultative Council of Rhône-Alpes, and from 1986 to 1992, he additionally served as president of the High Medical Council of Social Security in the Ministry of Social Affairs. He wrote the book Hors de la bulle about the treatment of children born with severe immunodeficiency.

Touraine is a Freemason and is affiliated with the Grand Orient de France.

=== Immunodeficiency work ===
During the 1970s, Touraine conducted most of his research on immunodeficiency. He participated in the first ever bone marrow and fetal thymus transplants. Touraine had a particular interest in immunodeficiency in newborn children.

=== AIDS research ===
After having created a mouse with a human immune system, Touraine used it to test several gene therapies for HIV/AIDS. The research director of Edouard Herriot Hospital, on the advice of the company Mydetics, attempted to patent these therapies, which combined two genes with a "vector" gene from cells. This project was conducted through a company registered in the tax haven of Bermuda. Due to research difficulties and a lack of response to questions from the United States Patent and Trademark Office, the patent was ultimately never made.

=== Cancer research ===
Starting in the 2000s with the founding of CEDIC, Touraine researched cancer while pursuing his political career at the same time. In 2004, CEDIC received 120 000 shares in Mydetics.

== Political career ==
Touraine was a member of the Socialist Party (PS) until 2017. He was elected to the municipal council of Lyon in 1989 and served on the council of the Urban Community of Lyon from 1989 to 2014. Touraine was also mayor of the 8th arrondissement of Lyon from 1995 to 2001. Vice-president of the Urban Community of Lyon from 1995 onwards, he served under Gérard Collomb as the first deputy mayor of Lyon from 2001 to 2014 and was charged with the transport, public tranquility and decentralization portfolios. As vice-president of the Lyon Metropolis, he was responsible for urban transport and road infrastructure until 2008. Touraine was additionally elected to the General Council of Rhône, serving from 2004 to 2007.

Touraine has served as president of the Lyon Condorcet Circle (Cercle Condorcet) since 2006, having succeeded Franck Sérusclat. He won a seat in the National Assembly during the 2007 French legislative elections, representing Rhône's 3rd constituency with Sarah Peillon as his designated substitute. Touraine defeated 21-year incumbent Jean-Michel Dubernard of the Union for a Popular Movement (UMP) in the election. In the 2012 French legislative elections, Touraine was re-elected with 59% of the vote. He has sat on the Committee on Social Affairs since 2010.

On 15 July 2013, Touraine and Senator Valérie Létard of the Union of Democrats and Independents (UDI) were tasked by Minister of the Interior Manuel Valls into leading an inquiry into the reform of the right of asylum. Their conclusions were delivered to the National Assembly in November 2013, in the wake of the Dibrani case.

In September 2016, Touraine endorsed Emmanuel Macron for the 2017 French presidential election and became a member of Macron's party La République En Marche (LREM). The 2017 French legislative elections saw Touraine re-elected with 59.85% of the vote in the second round, defeating Pascal Le Brun of La France Insoumise (FI), who received 40.15%.

In September 2017, Touraine proposed a bill supporting assisted dying, arguing that patients with untreatable medical conditions should be permitted to choose "active medical assistance in dying." He received the support of 156 members of the National Assembly on 28 February 2018, who wrote an article in Le Monde calling for legislation that would "give sick, dying patients the freedom to do what they wish with their bodies." Touraine also became president of a National Assembly study group on assisted dying.

In the summer of 2018, Touraine was appointed rapporteur of a fact-finding mission on the reform of bioethics laws, which was presided over by Xavier Breton of The Republicans (LR). He submitted his final report to the National Assembly in January 2019, which recommended the legalization of medically assisted reproduction for lesbian couples and celibate women and argued that "there is no right of children to have a father, no matter the situation." Touraine was further named rapporteur on articles 1 and 2 of a bill on bioethics, in which capacity he defended several amendments that opposed his government, particularly those on post-mortem and transgender access to medically assisted reproduction.

In 2020, Touraine joined En Commun (EC), a group within LREM led by Barbara Pompili. In 2021, he was appointed co-rapporteur of a fact-finding mission on medicine, along with Audrey Dufeu-Schubert. Their report was presented in June before the commission of social affairs of the National Assembly and proposed reforms to the pharmaceutical sector's governance, research, financing, industrial policy and price-fixing policies.

== Electoral offices ==
=== Parliamentary offices ===
- 17 June 2007 – 16 June 2012: Member of the National Assembly for Rhône's 3rd constituency
- 20 June 2012 – 20 June 2017: Member of the National Assembly for Rhône's 3rd constituency (re-elected)
- 21 July 2017 – Member of the National Assembly for Rhône's 3rd constituency (re-elected)

=== Local offices ===
- 1989 – 2020: Municipal councillor of Lyon
- 1989 – 2014: Member of the council of the Urban Community of Lyon
- 1995 – 2008: Vice-president of the Urban Community of Lyon
- 25 June 1995 – 18 March 2001: Mayor of the 8th arrondissement of Lyon
- 23 March 2001 – 4 April 2014: First deputy mayor of Lyon
- 29 March 2004 – 15 July 2007: General councillor of the 12th canton of Lyon

== Honours and decorations ==
- Knight of the Legion of Honour
- Officer of the National Order of Merit

== Bibliography ==
- Hors de la bulle, Paris, Groupe Flammarion, 1985.
- Donner la vie, choisir sa mort, Toulouse, Érès, 2019.
