= Bohdan Pomahač =

Czech plastic surgeon

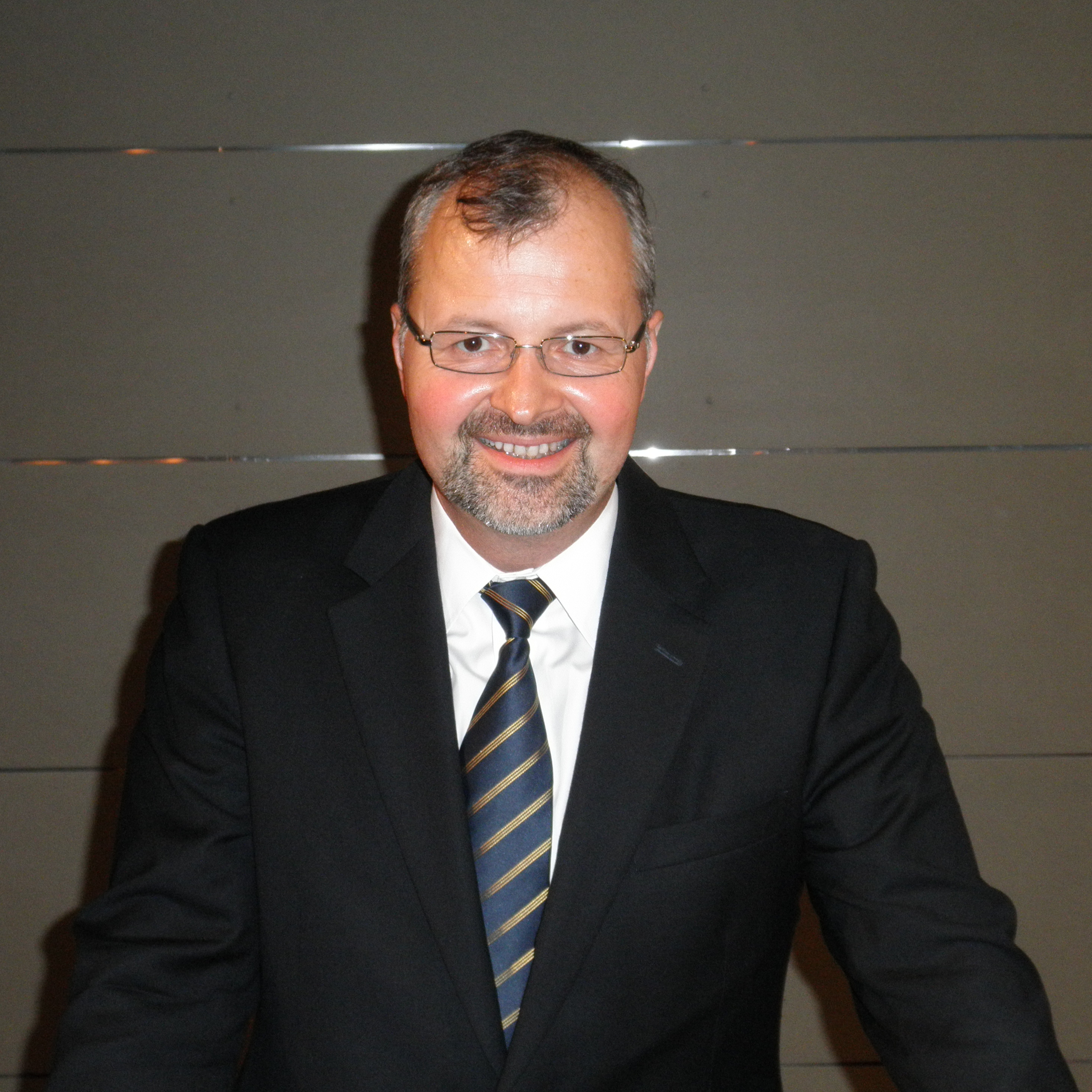
- Pomahač in 2012
- Born: 8 March 1971 (age 55); Ostrava, Czechoslovakia
- Education: Palacký University of Olomouc
- Known for: Performing the first full face transplant in the United States
- Scientific career
- Fields: Plastic surgery
- Workplaces: Yale New Haven Hospital

Bohdan Pomahač (Czech pronunciation: [ˈboɦdan ˈpomaɦatʃ]; born 8 March 1971) is a Czech plastic surgeon. He led the team that performed the first full face transplant in United States and the third overall in the world.

== Biography ==
Pomahač was born on 8 March 1971 in Ostrava, Czechoslovakia (now the Czech Republic). His parents were a chemical engineer and a school teacher. The family lived in a small three-room apartment, and used to spend weekends at their weekend house in Morávka, a municipality in the Moravian-Silesian Beskids mountain range.

As a teenager, Pomahač became a passionate chess player, devoting as many as 40 hours a week to his hobby. He was inspired by Anatoly Karpov and Garry Kasparov and made it to the major chess league in the country.

After finishing high school in Ostrava, Pomahač became a student at the Palacký University of Olomouc Faculty of Medicine. During the 6 years study, Pomahač went on exchange to Boston, United States, which influenced his subsequent career choice.

Pomahač left for the United States immediately after finishing his studies in the Czech Republic in 1996. He was employed at the Brigham and Women's Hospital, where he worked for 90–120 hours a week.

In 2000, Pomahač married Hana Augustinová, an eye doctor and also a Palacký University of Olomouc graduate. Together with their two children they live in Dover, a small town not far from Boston. They visit the Czech Republic once a year, when their children undergo Czech language tests in a school.

In August 2021, Pomahač became the chief of plastic surgery at Yale New Haven Hospital, Connecticut, United States.

=== Face transplants ===
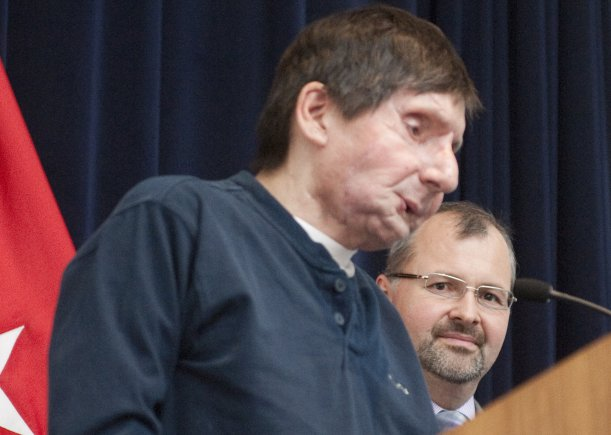
Face transplant recipient Jim Maki (left) with Bohdan Pomahač

Although face transplants were not the centre of his research work, by 2004 he became increasingly interested in the subject and devoted much of his free time to it. Great incentive came when Pomahač met Isabelle Dinoire, the first person to undergo partial face transplant in 2005 in France. Dinoire told him that if the face had not been accepted, she was ready to undergo the procedure again. When Pomahač asked another patient why he sought repeated surgery, he told the doctor: “I just want a cab to stop when I’m at the curb.”

In 2007 Pomahač became the head of the hospital's burn trauma centre and also head of the team specializing in facial transplants.

On 9 April 2009 Pomahač performed the second partial face transplant in the United States (and seventh in the world). During a 17-hour operation, a surgical team led by Pomahač, replaced the nose, upper lip, cheeks, and roof of the mouth - along with corresponding muscles, bones and nerves - of James Maki, age 59. Mr. Maki's face was severely injured after falling onto the electrified third rail at a Boston subway station in 2005. In May 2009, he made a public media appearance and declared he was happy with the result. This procedure was also shown in the eighth episode of the ABC documentary series Boston Med.

After that procedure was successfully completed, the Defense Department awarded a $3.4 million grant to the hospital in December 2009 to fund five face transplants, according to Col. Janet Harris, director of the Clinical and Rehabilitative Medicine Research Program for the Army Medical Research and Material Command.

On 22 March 2011 Pomahač performed the first full face transplant in the United States (and third in the world, after full face transplants in Spain and France) on Dallas Wiens, 25, who was injured by an electric shock that removed his face. Pomahač led the team of physicians, nurses and anaesthesiologists for more than 15 hours to replace Mr Wiens's nose, lips, facial skin, muscles of facial animation and the nerves that power them to provide sensation.

Two other patients are already on the list for other operations funded by the Defense Department. They are Mitch Hunter of Indianapolis, an Army veteran who was in a car crash after his Army stint, and Charla Nash, a Connecticut woman who lost her hands, nose, lips and eyelids in 2009 when she was mauled by a chimpanzee.

== Appearances ==
Pomahač has been a keynote speaker at the Congress of Future Medical Leaders (2014, 2015, 2016).
