= Daniel Borsuk =

Canadian plastic surgeon

Daniel Evan Borsuk OQ MSC FRCSC
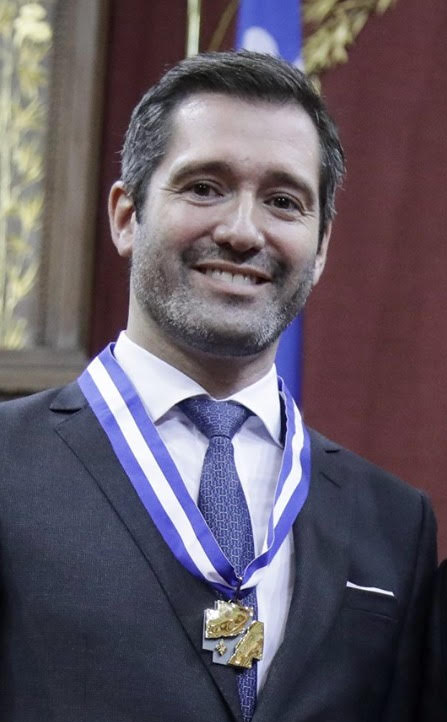
- Daniel Borsuk when being made an officer of the National Order of Quebec in 2019
- Born: January 19, 1978 (age 48); Montreal, Quebec, Canada
- Education: McGill University, Université de Montréal, Johns Hopkins Hospital
- Occupations: Plastic Surgeon; Chief of Plastic Surgery at Centre hospitalier universitaire Sainte-Justine
- Known for: First Canadian Face Transplant
- Awards: National Order of Quebec, Meritorious Service Cross

Daniel Evan Borsuk OQ MSC FRCSC (born January 19, 1978) is a Canadian plastic surgeon in Montreal, Quebec, who is a pioneer in facial reconstruction. The first Canadian face transplant was performed under his leadership. He is also an advocate for pet safety and education, a supporter of universal health care, an Officer of National Order of Québec, and the recipient of the Governor General of Canada Meritorious Service Cross.

== Biography ==
Borsuk was born in Montreal, Quebec, and obtained his Doctor of Medicine and Master of Business Administration from McGill University's joint M.D., C.M. & M.B.A. program before pursuing residency training in plastic and reconstructive surgery at Université de Montréal. He completed complementary fellowship training in the United States in adult and pediatric oral and maxillofacial surgery, microsurgery, and aesthetic surgery at Johns Hopkins Hospital and the Shock Trauma Center in Baltimore, Maryland.

Through his fellowship, Borsuk practiced in the University of Maryland Medical Center in Baltimore, Maryland, from 2011 to 2012. In March 2012, he was part of a surgical team that "performed the world's most extensive face transplant" up to that point. The 36-hour operation restored the face of a Virginia man who had lost much of his face in a gun accident. Borsuk "gained international fame" for his role in this effort, and returned to practice in Montreal that year. His experience in the United States led him to speak in favor of universal health care, available in Canada but not the U.S.

In May 2018, Borsuk led the team that performed the first Canadian complete face transplant at Montreal's Hôpital Maisonneuve-Rosemont. The transplant took over 30 hours and replaced the upper and lower jaws, nose, lips and teeth on Maurice Desjardins, a 64-year-old man that shot himself in a hunting accident. In December 2018, Borsuk again received national attention for leading the reconstructive surgery of the skull of a hydrocephalic girl, performing a 12-hour operation in which he disassembled her oversized skull, drained two litres of fluid from her brain, and reassembled pieces of her skull in a more normal size.

In June 2019, Borsuk was made an Officer of National Order of Québec, and in January 2024 was awarded the Governor General of Canada Meritorious Service Cross, for his international contributions to facial reconstruction, face transplant surgery, and aesthetic plastic surgery. In 2020, he was one of ten men profiled in the children's book, Dix gars passionnés: dix parcours inspirants (10 passionate men: 10 inspiring courses). In May 2021, Borsuk starred in a documentary series on the TV network TVA titled "Chirurgie Plastique: Reconstruire la Vie", which won the Prix Gémeaux for best documentary series for science & nature.

As of 2020, Borsuk is an associate professor, and Chief, of Plastic Surgery at Centre hospitalier universitaire Sainte-Justine (CHU Sainte-Justine), the largest mother and child center in Canada. He also runs a private aesthetic practice in Westmount, Québec.
