= The Know-How of Face Transplantation =

Textbook on face transplant surgery

- Editor: Maria Z. Siemionow
- Subject: Medicine, Surgery
- Publisher: Springer
- Publication date: 2011
- Pages: 493
- ISBN: 978-0-85729-252-0

The Know-How of Face Transplantation is a college-level textbook edited by Maria Siemionow that is 493 pages long. It was published in 2011 by Springer Publishing. Siemionow performed the first near-full face transplant in the United States, which is still extremely rare. Siemionow says that "30 have been done around the world."

== About the book ==
The textbook The Know-How of Face Transplantation was written and published in 2011. The book is divided into six sections:

1. Preclinical Approaches to Face Transplantation
2. Clinical Aspects in Preparation to Face Transplantation in Humans
3. Approval Process of Face Transplantation in Humans
4. Social and Public Relations in Face Transplantation
5. World Experience with Face Transplantation in Humans
6. Future Directions in Face Transplantation

== Contributors ==
The Know-How of Face Transplantation has 71 contributors from the medical, dental and other scientific fields. Notable contributors include Robert G. Hale and Maria Siemionow.
