= Connie Culp =

American face transplant recipient (1963–2020)

- Connie Culp, before and after the operation.
- Born: March 26, 1963; East Liverpool, Ohio, U.S.
- Died: July 29, 2020 (aged 57); Cleveland, Ohio, U.S.
- Known for: first U.S. recipient of a face transplant
- Spouse: Thomas G. "Tom" Culp (1980-)
- Children: 2

Connie Culp (March 26, 1963 – July 29, 2020) was the first United States recipient of a partial face transplant, performed at the Cleveland Clinic in December 2008.

== Facial disfigurement ==
Culp was shot in the face by her husband Thomas G. "Tom" Culp in a failed murder–suicide on September 21, 2004, inside their bar in Hopedale, Ohio. He also survived and was convicted in 2005 of aggravated attempted murder with a seven-year prison sentence. Culp forgave her husband at the sentencing and said she would be waiting when he gets out of prison, but on September 22, 2009, Culp said on an episode of Oprah that she no longer planned to wait for her former husband after her daughter asked her, "Mom, what kind of example would you be setting for me if you went back to the man who shot your face off?"

== Recovery ==
The shotgun blast destroyed Culp's nose, cheeks, the roof of her mouth and an eye. This led to her being legally blind, being unable to eat solid foods and having to breathe through a tracheostomy tube in her neck. She underwent 30 operations prior to the face transplant on December 10, 2008. Surgeon Maria Siemionow led a team of doctors in a 22-hour operation that replaced 80 percent of Culp's face with the face from another woman named Anna Kasper who had died a week before the operation.

Her nose was rebuilt and some of the disfigurement repaired in the operation. The Associated Press reported that Culp was able to breathe on her own and eat solid food following the transplant, adding "Ms. Culp's expressions are still a bit wooden, and she remains almost blind (right eye is prosthetic, left eye is damaged), but she can talk, smile, smell and taste food again, and has learned braille. Her speech is at times difficult to understand. Her face is bloated and squarish, and her skin droops in folds that doctors plan to pare away as her circulation improves and her nerves grow, animating new muscles." She worked as an advocate fostering understanding for survivors of burns or other disfigurements.

In 2010, Culp had her final facial surgery performed and regained much of her facial function, including the ability to smile, speak, and feel facial sensations due to the regrowth of facial nerves.

== Death ==
On July 29, 2020, Culp died from an infection unrelated to her face transplant which she contracted 10 to 12 years before. She was 57 years old.

Frank Papay, the chair of the Cleveland Clinic's Dermatology and Plastic Surgery Institute who was on Culp's surgical squad, reflected upon her death: "Connie was an incredibly brave, vibrant woman and an inspiration to many. Her strength was evident in the fact that she had been the longest-living face transplant patient to date. She was a great pioneer and her decision to undergo a sometimes-daunting procedure is an enduring gift for all of humanity."

== See also ==
- Dallas Wiens
- Isabelle Dinoire
- Domestic violence
