= Marie-Charlotte Garin =

French politician (born 1995)

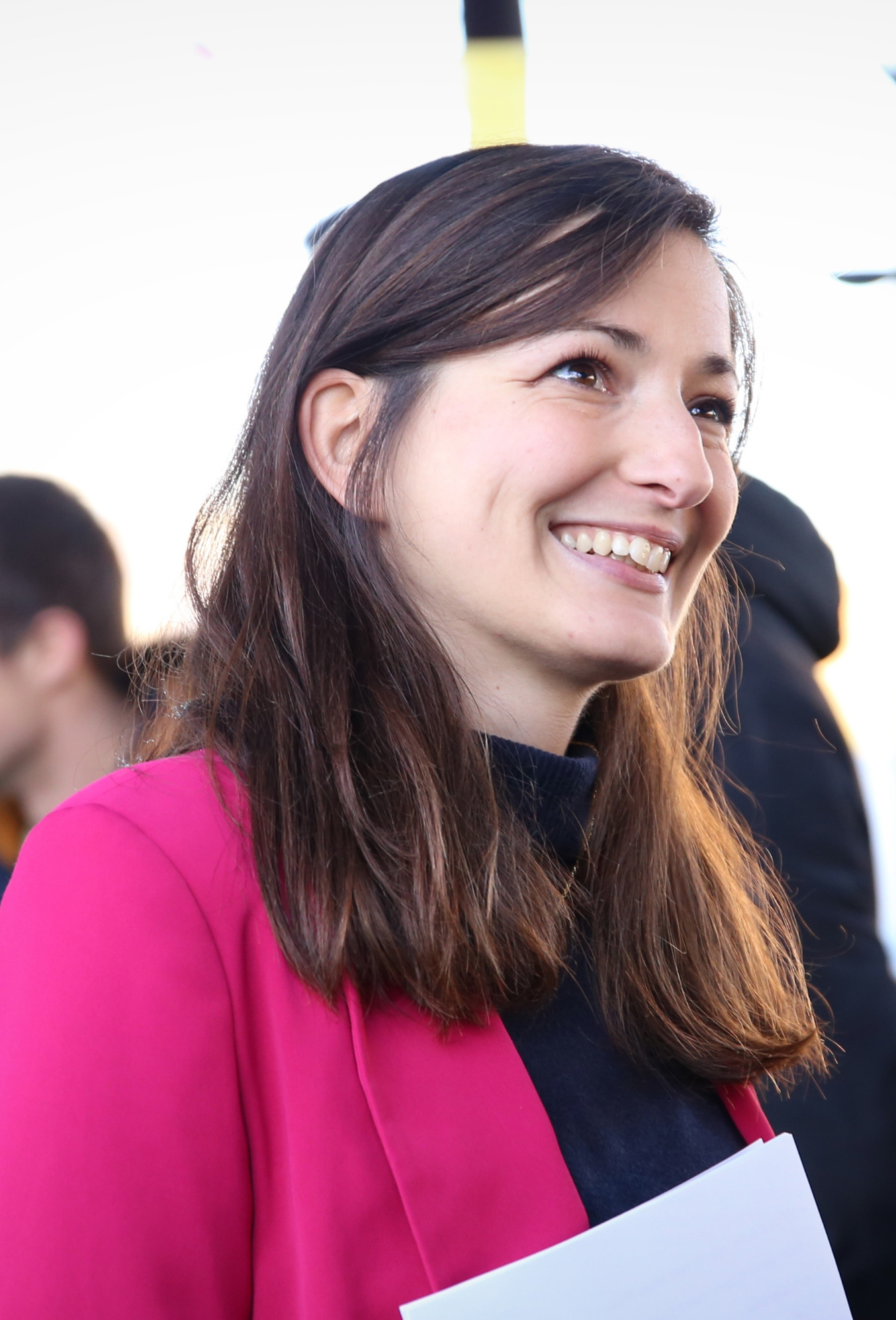
- Garin in 2023

Member of the National Assembly for Rhône's 3rd constituency
- Incumbent
- Assumed office 22 June 2022
- Preceded by: Jean-Louis Touraine

Personal details
- Born: 2 September 1995 (age 30) Vernon, Eure, France
- Party: The Ecologists
- Other political affiliations: New Ecological and Social People's Union; New Popular Front

Marie-Charlotte Garin (French pronunciation: [maʁiʃaʁlɔt ɡaʁɛ̃]; born 2 September 1995) is a French politician of The Ecologists who has represented the 3rd constituency of Rhône in the National Assembly since 2022. Her constituency encompasses parts of the 3rd, 7th and 8th arrondissements of Lyon.

== Career ==
Garin was elected to the National Assembly in Rhône's 3rd constituency in the 2022 legislative election with 54.7% of the second-round vote. She succeeded Jean-Louis Touraine of La République En Marche! who did not run for a fourth term in office.

She was reelected with 51.5% of the first-round vote in the 2024 snap election.

== See also ==
- List of deputies of the 16th National Assembly of France
- List of deputies of the 17th National Assembly of France
