= Annabel Heseltine =

British journalist

The Honourable Annabel Heseltine
- Born: Annabel Mary Dibdin Heseltine; July 25, 1963 (age 63); London, England
- Education: St Mary's College, Durham
- Occupations: Journalism; magazine editor and podcaster
- Spouse: Peter Butler (m. 1998; div. 2018)
- Children: 4
- Parent: Michael Heseltine
- Website: www.annabelheseltine.com

Annabel Mary Dibdin Heseltine is an English journalist, editor and the host of Hope Springs podcast sponsored by the Resurgence trust. She was previously editor of the education magazine School House.

== Early life ==
Born in London, the elder daughter of the politician and former deputy Prime Minister Michael Heseltine and Lady Heseltine, née Anne Williams. She was educated at Cobham Hall School, Tudor Hall and Stowe School, and holds a bachelors in Economic History from Durham University and a masters in Wildlife Management & Conservation from Reading University. Two years ago she was diagnosed ADHD. Her family are all neurodiverse.

== Career ==
Heseltine trained as a fashion buyer at Bloomingdales in New York.

Aged 22, she became the Assistant-editor for the Hong Kong Tatler. From 1990 - 2006, Heseltine worked for broadsheets and tabloids including the Daily Mail's YOU magazine, The Times, The Sunday Times and The Daily Telegraph. and also magazines including Vogue, The Economist and the New Statesman.

Her own experiences as an older mother unable to conceive a child and subsequent path on the IVF route has been well documented. Her advocacy of the legalisation of drugs led her father, while deputy prime minister, to dissociate himself from her opinions on the issue.

She was one of the founding editors for the upmarket concierge company, Quintessentially.

Heseltine was previously the editor of School House Magazine, a triannual magazine published by Country & Town House, which seeks "to offer parents real insight into the world of independent education." She left School House in September 2021.

She describes herself as "a journalist, editor, TV and radio broadcaster" specialising in "conservation, the wilder side of travel and spiritual well-being." She writes a column, "Time Out", for School House and hosts a podcast, "Hope Springs", for the Resurgence Trust "talking to visionaries, conservationists, mental health, environmental and climate change activists about their inspiration and motivation to make positive change for the benefit of our planet."

== Personal life ==
Heseltine is divorced and lives between London and West Wiltshire with her four children all of whom have been diagnosed with dyslexia. She was previously married to Irish plastic surgeon Peter Butler.

Heseltine has travelled extensively and has studied Buddhism, yoga and meditation; she is an accomplished triathlete.
