= Joseph G. McCarthy =

American plastic surgeon

Joseph G. McCarthy (born November 28, 1938) is an American plastic and reconstructive surgeon known for his notable contributions to facial surgery, his advocacy on behalf of patients with facial differences and his training of many outstanding plastic surgeons. He served as Chief of Plastic Surgery for over 30 years at NYU Langone Health. He is professor emeritus at the Hansjorg Wyss Department of Plastic Surgery at the New York University Grossman School of Medicine. His major research focus was in Craniofacial Distraction, a widely adopted technique in craniofacial surgery. He also promoted the concept of surgical reconstruction of the face as young as infancy to avoid or ameliorate future psychosocial problems.

== Early life and education ==
McCarthy was born in Lowell, Massachusetts. He graduated with a bachelor's degree from Harvard University in 1960 and received his MD from the College of Physicians and Surgeons, Columbia University in 1964 where he was President of the P&S Club and won the Joseph Garrison Parker Award.

== Career ==
He completed a general surgical residency at the Columbia-Presbyterian Medical Center, followed by a residency in plastic surgery under John Marquis Converse. at the NYU Medical Center. In 1973 he joined the faculty and in 1981 he was named the Lawrence D. Bell Professor of Plastic Surgery and director of the Institute of Reconstructive Plastic Surgery.

One of his landmark contributions is his work in developing craniofacial distraction osteogenesis, a technique that uses mechanical devices to gradually lengthen bones. McCarthy first conceived of the concept of distraction of the bones of the craniofacial skeleton after observing a patient undergoing lower extremity lengthening or distraction by the llizarov technique. Starting with animal models, followed by clinical studies, he and his team demonstrated a major breakthrough in the treatment of deficiencies of the lower and upper jaws, midface, and cranium. Prior to the introduction of craniofacial distraction, the traditional surgical procedures tended to be lengthy, required multiple blood transfusions and the harvest of bone grafts, and they could not be considered in the younger patient. This work has become a cornerstone of modern craniofacial surgery.

McCarthy oversaw one of the largest plastic surgery educational programs. He oversaw the training of 125 residents in plastic surgery and 35 post-residency fellows in craniofacial surgery, many of whom went on to leadership positions in academic plastic surgery.

== Foundation ==
He was the Founding Chair of the Medical Advisory Board and Member of the Inaugural Board of Directors of Smile Train, an international non-profit to treat children with facial differences. By 2024 Smile Train had treated over 2 million patients in over 90 countries around the world.

From 1981 to 2001 he was a member of the board of trustees of myFace, a foundation dedicated to supporting the multidisciplinary care of patients with facial difference at the NYU myFace Center. McCarthy was medical director for the development of CIVA Pro, the Craniofacial Interactive Virtual Assistant. CIVA provides a cloud-based educational tool that interactively showcases common craniofacial operations to provide information to practitioners and patients.

He was the progenitor of SiriusXM Doctor Radio, a satellite channel broadcasting a full range of medical topics, and hosted the weekly Plastic Surgery Show.

== Awards ==
- Pioneer Surgeon Award by University of Zurich, 2001
- Honorary Award by American Association of Plastic Surgeons, 2005
- Gold Medal for Clinical Excellence (Columbia University Vagelos College of Physicians and Surgeons) 2009
- Outstanding Achievement in Clinical Research Award by American Society of Plastic Surgeons, 2009
- Master Clinician Honor (NYU Grossman School of Medicine), 2010
- Lifetime Achievement Award (American Society of Maxillofacial Surgeons), 2010
- Tessier Gold Medal by International Society of Craniofacial Surgeons, 2015

== Bibliography ==
McCarthy was the editor of the eight-volume text Plastic Surgery (1990), a reference source for all aspects of the discipline. Later texts were Distraction of the Craniofacial Skeleton (1999), Current Therapy in Plastic Surgery (2005) and Craniofacial Distraction (1999, 2017). He and his colleagues have published over 300 articles in scientific journals, some of which rank among the most cited in the field
