= Tudor Hall School, Banbury =

Tudor Hall

Location
- Wykham Park; Banbury, Oxfordshire, OX16 9UR; England; 52.0391°N 1.3591°W

Information
- Type: Private day and boarding
- Motto: Latin: Habeo ut dem (I have in order that I may give)
- Religious affiliation: Church of England
- Established: 1850; 176 years ago
- Founder: The Rev. John Wood Todd, D.D., and Mrs. Martha Todd
- Local authority: Oxfordshire
- Ofsted: Reports
- Chairman of the Governors: Jennifer Scarfe
- Headmistress: Julie Lodrick
- Gender: Girls
- Age: 11 to 18
- Enrolment: 330~
- Houses: 4
- Colours: Pink, yellow, green, blue
- Publication: The Tudorian
- Former pupils: Old Tudorians
- Badge: Tudor rose
- School hymn: To Be a Pilgrim
- Website: www.tudorhallschool.com

Tudor Hall School is a private day and boarding school for girls in Oxfordshire, situated between Bloxham and Banbury. It was founded by a Baptist Minister and his wife, and moved to several different places before the purchase of its current premises after the Second World War.

== History ==
Tudor Hall was founded in 1850 in Salisbury, by the Rev. John Wood Todd and his wife Martha, and moved to the Forest Hill area of London in around 1854, initially at Perry Hill House, and later at Red Hall, or Tudor House, from which the school's name emerged.

By the 1900s, the school had expanded and was in need of more space. In 1908, it moved to Chislehurst in Kent. The school later went through difficult times and had to be closed for a term in 1935. Former pupil Nesta Inglis, elder daughter of banker and Marylebone Cricket Club amateur cricketer Alfred Inglis, took over as headmistress and reopened the school.

At the outbreak of World War II, the school relocated to Burnt Norton, near Chipping Campden, Gloucestershire, to escape air raids. However, it outgrew the property during the war. Inglis came across some land outside Banbury, Oxfordshire, and the purchase was made in February 1944. The school moved to the new location in January 1946.

Tudor Hall owned a prep school, Carrdus School, which closed in 2025, allegedly because of the Labour government imposition of VAT on private school fees.

== Boarding ==
Tudor Hall offers a full boarding programme. Over two-thirds of pupils are boarders. New boarders are usually assigned an older girl to assist them with adjustment to boarding life. There are full-time residential staff who live on-campus.

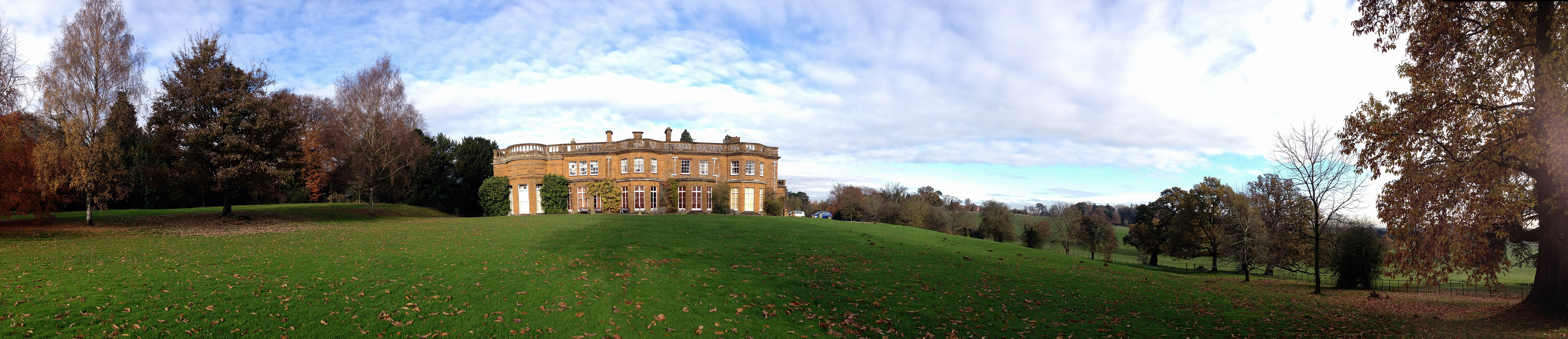
Tudor Hall Main School from the back lawn

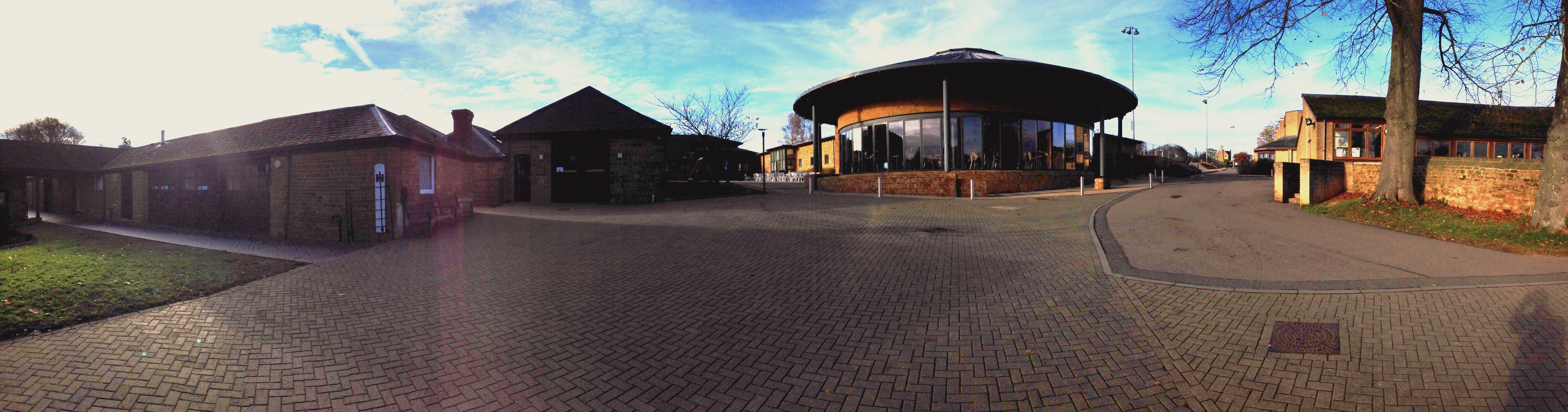
Tudor Hall School, Banbury (Design and Technology, Dining Room and Art Department)

== Houses ==
Upon entry each girl is assigned to a house, each of which is named after one of the Royal Houses that ruled over England.

- Tudor
- Stuart
- Lancaster
- York

== Notable old girls ==
Former pupils are known as "Old Tudorians"

- Beatrice Offor, artist
- Annabel Heseltine, journalist and broadcaster
- Serena Armitage, Academy Award Winner for Best Short Film ‘Stutterer’
- Julia Peyton-Jones, former Director of Serpentine Gallery & winner of Lifetime Achievement Award at Women of the World festival
- Patsy Seddon, British womenswear designer who founded clothing brand Phase Eight
- Nichola Pease, British Fund Manager
- Monica Vinader, Founder and Creative Director of British jewellery brand Monica Vinader
- Francesca Cumani, ITV Presenter, horse racing
- Lady Margarita Armstrong-Jones, granddaughter of Princess Margaret and greatniece of Queen Elizabeth II
