= Selahattin Özmen =

Turkish plastic surgeon

- Education: Hacettepe University, Gazi University
- Known for: Third face transplant in Turkey
- Scientific career
- Fields: Plastic surgery
- Workplaces: Koç University; American Hospital

Selahattin Özmen is a Turkish plastic surgeon and professor of plastic surgery at the Koç University School of Medicine. He is also affiliated with the Department of Plastic, Reconstructive and Aesthetic Surgery at American Hospital in Istanbul. In 2012, he performed Turkey's third face transplant at Gazi University in Ankara.

== Education ==
Özmen graduated from the Faculty of Medicine at Hacettepe University. He completed his specialist training in plastic and reconstructive surgery at Gazi University between 1995 and 2002. From 2002 to 2003, he undertook further training at the Cleveland Clinic in Ohio, United States. He later trained at Sahlgrenska Akademin in Gothenburg, Sweden, in 2004 and in Hamburg, Germany, in 2006.

== Career ==
On 17 March 2012, Özmen performed Turkey's third face transplant at Gazi University Hospital in Ankara. The partial transplant was performed on 20 year old Hatice Nergis and was reported as Turkey's first woman-to-woman face transplant and the first in the country to include bone tissue. Nergis had previously undergone a number of reconstructive procedures following a severe facial injury.
