= Dallas Wiens =

First full face transplant recipient

- Born: May 6, 1985; Fort Worth, Texas, United States
- Died: September 27, 2024 (aged 39); Fort Worth, Texas, United States
- Known for: First full face transplant in the U.S.
- Children: 1

Dallas Wiens (May 6, 1985 – September 27, 2024) was an American man who was the recipient of the first full face transplant operation in the United States, performed at the Brigham and Women's Hospital during the week of March 14, 2011. It was the first such operation in United States and the third in the world.

== Facial disfigurement ==
Wiens was burned by a high voltage wire on November 13, 2008, when he was painting Ridglea Baptist Church in Fort Worth, Texas. He was standing inside a boom lift when his forehead made contact with a high-voltage wire. Transported by helicopter to Parkland Memorial Hospital, surgeons performed more than a dozen debridement procedures over approximately two months to remove the burned skin. As part of this process, they enucleated his left eye, and set his right eye back in its socket before covering it with a skin flap to protect it from further damage. Later, surgeons spent 36 hours over two days working to reconstruct Wiens's face using muscle from his back. This left him with half of his scalp, a small portion of flesh on the left side of his chin, and without eyebrows, eyelids, a nose or lips, though he had a horizontal opening for his mouth.

== Recovery ==
Wiens was left permanently blind and without lips, a nose or eyebrows. Doctors told the family that Wiens would likely be paralyzed from the neck down and would never speak or produce enough saliva to eat solid food. They put him in a medically induced coma for three months. After awakening, and becoming frustrated with attempts to teach him how to communicate using a computer, Wiens started learning how to speak, despite having been told that it was not possible. Having made unprecedented progress, he was given a speaking tracheotomy to help him speak more easily. Soon after, he was able to hold himself up with his legs, and so was provided with physical therapy in order to further strengthen his legs. Though acting against medical advice, Wiens demonstrated that he was capable of eating solid food in March 2009. He left the hospital in May 2009, using a wheelchair for the majority of the time. However, he was walking without the wheelchair by Christmas 2009.

In March 2011, a transplant team of more than 30 doctors and nurses, alongside 8 surgeons from across multiple disciplines, led by Bohdan Pomahač, performed a full face transplant at Brigham and Women's Hospital in Boston. It took 15 hours. Wiens' sight could not be recovered in this surgery, so he was fitted with an acrylic ocular prosthesis, which sat over the skin protecting his right eye. He had been able to talk on the phone and had regained his sense of smell. The operation was paid for with the help of the US Department of Defense, which hopes to gain knowledge from the procedure to help soldiers suffering from facial injuries.

By 2011, Wiens had undergone more than fifty surgeries since his injury in 2008. In 2023, Dallas married Annalyn Bell Wiens, who he met at a burn victim support group.

== Public appearance ==
On May 9, 2011, Wiens made his first public appearance after the surgery, wearing dark sunglasses. He said that his young daughter told him "Daddy, you're so handsome" when she saw him after the operation. He also said of his new face, "It feels as if it has become my own."

== Death ==
Wiens died from kidney failure at his home in Fort Worth, Texas on September 27, 2024.

== See also ==
- Connie Culp
- Isabelle Dinoire
