= American Society of Maxillofacial Surgeons =

The American Society of Maxillofacial Surgeons (ASMS) is a professional organization focused on the science and practice of surgery of the facial region and craniofacial skeleton. The organization is involved in education, research, and advocacy on behalf of patients and maxillofacial surgeons.

== History ==
The American Society of Maxillofacial Surgeons (ASMS) was founded in 1947. Early members were largely dual-trained in dentistry and medicine. Over the ensuing years, a relationship with the American Medical Association and American Society of Plastic and Reconstructive Surgeons (now the American Society of Plastic Surgeons) was fostered. After development of formal maxillofacial training programs and later the birth of the field of craniofacial surgery, the scope of training required for ASMS membership broadened to include surgeons with an MD degree and formal maxillofacial training. The society commemorated its 75th anniversary in 2022 by honoring the long history and current role of military surgeons in advancing treatment of maxillofacial conditions and by exploring the interplay between the past and future of maxillofacial surgery in a special edition of the journal FACE.

== Education and research ==
Education of trainees and peers has been an organizational objective since the inception of the ASMS. The Kazanjian lectureship was initiated in 1966. This now biennial lectureship currently alternates with the Converse lectureship at the ASMS portion of the annual meeting of the American Society of Plastic Surgeons.

The maxillofacial basics workshop was founded in 1979. Fundamentals of maxillofacial surgery and basic techniques for management of maxillofacial trauma and orthognathic conditions are taught to residents and fellows around North America semiannually.

In 1998, the ASMS initiated a one-day intensive lecture series preceding the annual meeting of the American Society of Plastic Surgeons. Each year, the ASMS pre-conference symposium provided a multi-disciplinary education on topics in the field of craniomaxillofacial surgery for students, surgeons-in-training, and practicing plastic and maxillofacial surgeons. In the late 2010's, topics featured in the ASMS pre-conference symposium became more broadly incorporated into the regular program of the American Society of Plastic Surgeons annual meeting.

In 2003, two educational fellowships were established to foster advanced learning in the field of craniomaxillofacial surgery. The organization also offers grants for research on maxillofacial conditions to foster new innovations that may improve surgical treatment.

In 2023, the ASMS launched international educational programs. The first was a partnership with both the Korean Cleft Palate-Craniofacial Association and Korean Society for Simulation Surgery, focusing on cutting edge techniques in craniomaxillofacial surgery. This was followed shortly thereafter by a maxillofacial symposium in collaboration with the Romanian Association of Plastic Surgeons. International exchange of ideas and experience is a growing focus of the ASMS given the diverse clinical scope of maxillofacial surgery.

== Scholarly work ==
In 2020, the ASMS launched the journal, FACE, in collaboration with the American Society of Craniofacial Surgeons. This SAGE Publishing journal is dedicated to advancing the art and science of craniomaxillofacial surgery by disseminating evidence-based peer reviewed research. In 2022, the FACE call podcast was developed to highlight individual papers in FACE and provide short-term open access to journal articles in addition to audio content. The following year, 2023, FACE became indexed in Scopus.

== Maxillofacial conditions ==
American Society of Maxillofacial Surgeons initiatives focus on problems with facial form or function, including congenital craniofacial differences, facial trauma, reconstruction after head and neck cancer, and problems with bite. Congenital craniofacial differences are conditions affecting the head and face that present at or shortly after birth such as craniosynostosis, cleft lip and palate, hemifacial microsomia (a.k.a. craniofacial microsomia, oculoauriculovertebral spectrum, or Goldenhar syndrome), and Treacher Collins syndrome (a.k.a. mandibulofacial dysostosis). Traumatic facial injuries include orbital (eye socket) fracture, mandible (jaw) fracture, nasal fracture (broken nose), dog bite, and gunshot wound. Treatment of head and neck cancer and skin cancer of the face often results in missing tissue requiring jaw reconstruction, skin reconstruction, and nose reconstruction. Problems with occlusion (bite) may be treated with orthognathic surgery. American Society of Maxillofacial Surgeons members have contributed to early achievement in face transplant, which is emerging as treatment for the most severe maxillofacial deformities.
