= Face transplant =

Medical procedure to replace a person's face using donor tissue

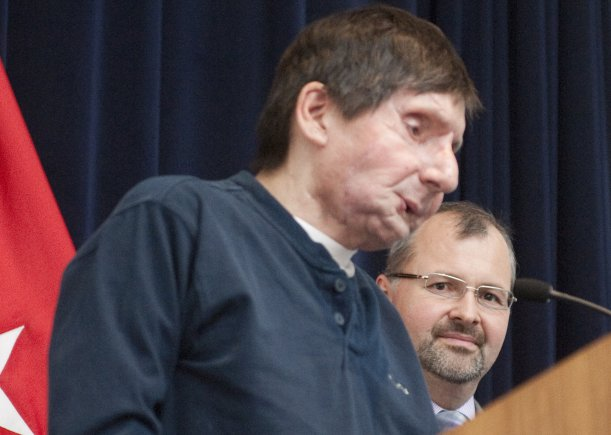
- Face transplant recipient Jim Maki (left) with plastic surgeon Bohdan Pomahač
- MeSH: D054445

A facial transplant is a medical procedure in which a significant portion of tissue is grafted onto the donor recipient's face, typically involving the use of facial tissues from a deceased donor. It is a form of Vascularized Composite Tissue Allotransplantation (VCA), a surgical technique involving the transplantation of multiple types of tissues as a functional unit. Facial transplantation may include the grafting of skin, lips, facial musculature, sensory nerves, and, potentially, underlying facial bones such as those of the nose. Recipients of face transplants require lifelong immunosuppressive therapy to prevent rejection of the transplanted tissue by the immune system.

The first successful partial face transplant on a living human was performed on Isabelle Dinoire in November 2005 at the Amiens-Picardie University Hospital in France. The 15‑hour surgical operation transplanted a triangular graft comprising the nose, lips, and chin from a deceased donor onto Dinoire, who had suffered a traumatic facial injury earlier that year. The first full face transplant was completed in Spain in March 2010 by a team at Vall d'Hebron University Hospital in Barcelona, Spain, onto a male recipient with significant facial abnormalities. This was done across several procedures.

Turkey, France, the United States, and Spain are considered leading countries in performing and conducting further research into the procedure. As of 2025, it is estimated that approximately 50 facial transplants have been successfully performed internationally.

The ethical, psychosocial, and medical aspects of face transplantation are still subject to debate, particularly concerning topics such as long-term immunosuppression, changes in identity and in quality of life. In October 2019, the UK Research and Innovation (UKRI) funded AboutFace, led by British cultural historian Fay Bound Alberti (University of York). The project convened surgeons, ethicists, and patients globally to determine potential future developments in the field of facial transplantation. This groundwork contributed to a subsequent report by the National Academies of Sciences, Engineering, and Medicine (NASEM), who proposed updated guidance aiming to improve patient care and procedural outcomes.

== Beneficiaries of face transplant ==
People with faces altered by trauma, burns, illness, or birth abnormalities may benefit from the procedure. Professor Peter Butler at the Royal Free Hospital in London, England first suggested this approach in treating survivors of facial traumas in a Lancet article in 2002. This suggestion caused considerable debate at the time concerning the ethics of this procedure.

Some patients may benefit from facial reconstruction as an alternative to facial transplantation, which typically involves grafting the patient's own tissues from their back, buttocks, thighs, or chest to their face in a series of operations to regain some functionality, although this often leads to considerably poorer cosmetic outcomes.

== History ==
=== Ancient period (3000 BC–500 AD) ===
Treatments for the repairing of a broken nose are first mentioned in the Egyptian medical text known as the Edwin Smith papyrus (c. 1600 BC).The early trauma surgery textbook was named after the American Egyptologist, Edwin Smith, one of the earliest known surgical texts focused on trauma care. Reconstructive surgery techniques were being carried out in India by 800 BC. Particularly as documented in Sushruta Samhita, which describes methods for nasal reconstruction using skin flaps. Sushrata, a physician of the 6th century BC, made significant contributions to early plastic and cataract surgery and is widely regarded as a foundational figure in reconstructive surgery.

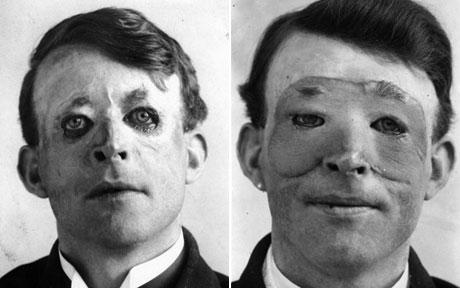
Walter Yeo, a sailor injured at the Battle of Jutland, is assumed to have received plastic surgery in 1917. The photograph shows him immediately following (right) the flap surgery by Sir Harold Gillies, and after healing (left).

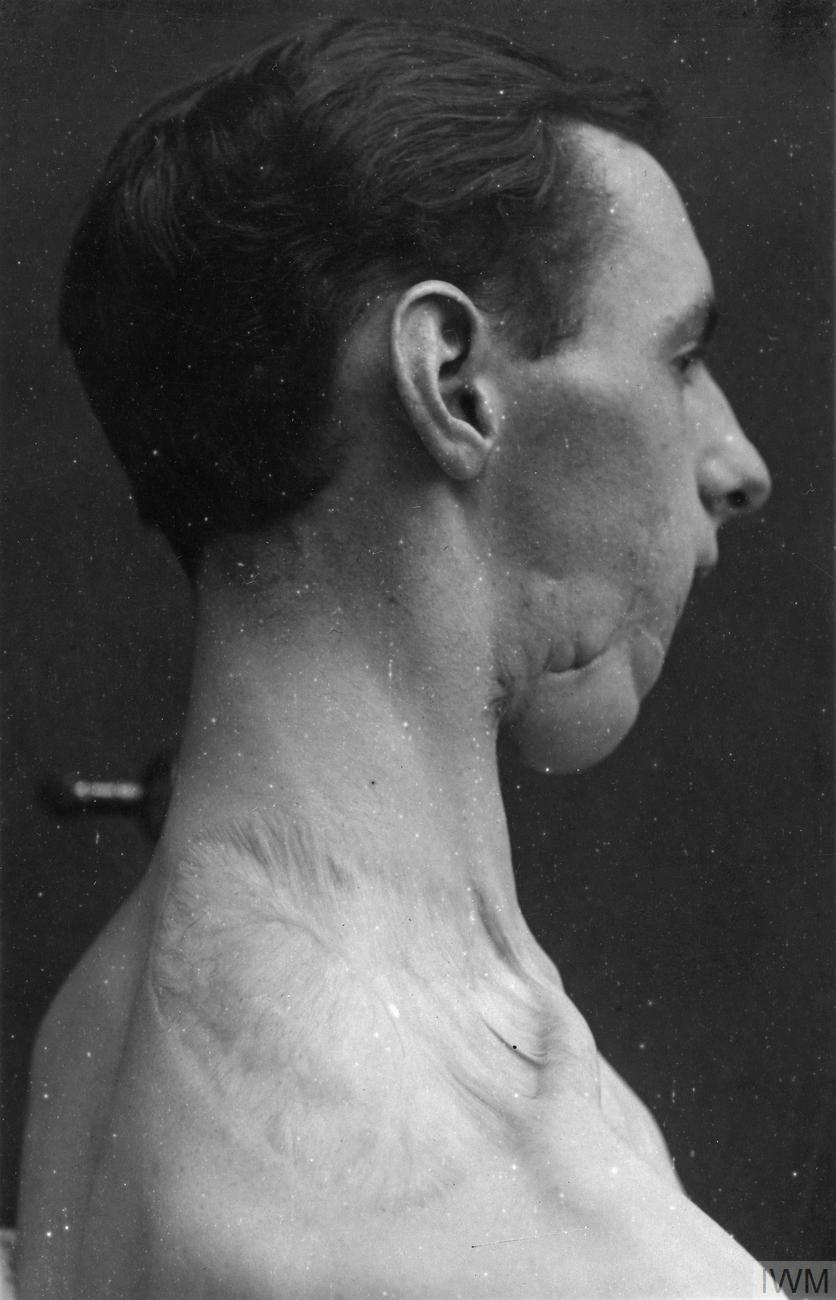
A patient after receiving plastic surgery from Harold Gillies, during World War I

The father of modern plastic surgery is generally considered to have been Sir Harold Gillies. A New Zealand otolaryngologist working in London, he developed many of the techniques of modern facial surgery in caring for soldiers with disfiguring facial injuries during the First World War.

=== Self as donor ("face replant") ===
The world's first full-face replant operation was on 9-year-old Sandeep Kaur, whose face was lost to a traumatic injury. Sandeep arrived at the hospital unconscious with her face in two pieces in a plastic bag. An article in The Guardian recounts: "In 1994, a nine-year-old child in northern India lost her face and scalp in a threshing machine accident. Her parents raced to the hospital with her face in a plastic bag and a surgeon managed to reconnect the arteries and replant the skin." The operation was successful, although she was left with some muscle damage as well as scarring around the perimeter where the facial skin was sutured back on. Sandeep's doctor was Abraham Thomas, one of India's top microsurgeons. In 2004, Sandeep was training to be a nurse.

In 1996, a similar operation was performed in the Australian state of Victoria, when a woman's face and scalp, torn off in a similar accident, was packed in ice and successfully reattached.

=== Partial face transplant ===
==== France ====
The world's first partial face transplant on a living human was carried out on 27 November 2005 by Bernard Devauchelle, an oral and maxillofacial surgeon, Benoit Lengelé, a Belgian plastic surgeon, and Jean-Michel Dubernard in Amiens, France. Isabelle Dinoire underwent surgery to replace her original face, which had sustained a traumatic injury. A triangle of face tissue from a deceased donor's nose and mouth was grafted onto the patient. On 13 December 2007, the first detailed report of the progress of this transplant after 18 months was released in the New England Journal of Medicine and documents that the patient was happy with the results but also that the journey has been very difficult, especially with respect to her immune system's response. Dinoire died on 22 April 2016 at the age of 49 due to cancer induced by medications she was taking.

In March 2008, the treatment of 30-year-old Pascal Coler of France, who has neurofibromatosis, ended after he received what his doctors called the world's first successful almost full-face transplant. The operation, which lasted approximately 20 hours, was designed and performed by Laurent Lantieri and his team (Jean-Paul Meningaud, Antonios Paraskevas and Fabio Ingallina).

==== China ====
In April 2006, Guo Shuzhong at the Xijing military hospital in Xi'an, transplanted the cheek, upper lip, and nose of Li Guoxing, who sustained severe injuries after being attacked by an Asiatic black bear while protecting his sheep. On 21 December 2008, it was reported that Li had died in July in his home village in Yunnan. Prior to his death, a documentary on the Discovery Channel showed he had stopped taking his immuno-suppressant medications in favour of herbal remedies; a decision that was likely a contributing factor to his death, as stated by his surgeon.

==== Turkey ====
Selahattin Özmen performed a partial face transplant on 17 March 2012 on Hatice Nergis, a twenty-year-old woman at Gazi University's hospital in Ankara. It was Turkey's third facial transplantation, the first woman-to-woman and the first three-dimensional transplantation with bone tissue. The patient from Kahramanmaraş had lost her upper jaw six years prior in a firearm accident, including her mouth, lips, palate, teeth and nasal cavity, leading to significant impairment. She had undergone around 35 reconstructive plastic surgery operations. The donor was a 28-year-old Turkish woman of Moldavian origin. Nergis died in Ankara on 15 November 2016 after she was hospitalized two days prior complaining about acute pain.

==== Belgium ====
In December 2011, a 54-year-old man underwent a partial face transplant to the lower two-thirds of the face (including bone) after a ballistic accident. The operation was performed by a multidisciplinary team led by plastic surgeon Phillip Blondeel. Hubert Vermeersch, Nathalie Roche and Filip Stillaert were also members of the surgical team. For the first time, 3-D CT planning was used to plan the operation, which lasted 20 hours. As of 2014, the patient is alive, with "good recovery of motor and sensory function and social reintegration".

==== Italy ====
In September 2018, a 49-year-old woman affected by Neurofibromatosis type I received a partial face transplant from a 21-year-old female donor at Sant'Andrea Hospital of Sapienza University in Rome. The procedure took 27 hours and was carried out by two teams led by Fabio Santanelli di Pompeo and Benedetto Longo. The patient had a complication and after two days the surgeons had to replace the facial graft with autologous tissue. The patient is still alive and waiting for a second face transplantation.

==== Canada ====
In May 2018, the first Canadian complete face transplant was performed under the leadership of plastic surgeon Daniel Borsuk at the Hôpital Maisonneuve-Rosemont, in Montreal, Quebec. The transplant took over 30 hours and replaced the upper and lower jaws, nose, lips, and teeth on Maurice Desjardins, a 64-year-old man that sustained an accidental gun-shot wound to the face. At that time, Desjardins was the oldest person to benefit from a face transplant.

=== Full face transplant ===
On 20 March 2010, a team of 30 Spanish doctors led by plastic surgeon Joan Pere Barret at the Vall d'Hebron University Hospital in Barcelona carried out the world's first full face transplant, on a man injured in a shooting accident.

On 8 July 2010, the French media reported that a full face transplant, including tear ducts and eyelids, was carried out at the Henri-Mondor hospital in Créteil.

In March 2011, a surgical team, led by Bohdan Pomahač at Brigham and Women's Hospital in Boston, Massachusetts, performed a full face transplant on Dallas Wiens, who sustained severe physical injuries to the face in a power line accident that left him blind and without lips, nose or eyebrows. The patient's sight couldn't be recovered but he was able to talk on the phone and smell. In April 2011, the same surgical team at Brigham and Women's Hospital performed a second full face transplant on Mitch Hunter of Speedway, Indiana.

==== Spain ====
Spain has played a leading role in the development of facial transplantation. In March 2010, the hospital Vall d'Hebron in Barcelona performed the world’s first total face transplant. The procedure was carried out on March 20 by a multidisciplinary team of 30 professionals led by Joan Pere Barret and lasted approximately 22 hours. Unlike the previous face transplants performed which had involved partial grafts, this operation consisted of a full facial allograft. The recipient was a young man with severe facial trauma that caused impairment in his breathing, swallowing, and speech. The transplant included the complete facial skin and musculature, nose, lips, upper jaw (maxilla), mandible, cheekbones, palate, and teeth. The procedure required complex reconstructive and microvascular surgery to ensure proper revascularization of the graft.

==== Poland ====
On 15 May 2013, at the Maria Skłodowska-Curie Institute of Oncology branch in Gliwice, Poland, an entire face was transplanted onto a male patient, Grzegorz (aged 33) after he sustained severe facial injury in a machining accident. The surgery took 27 hours and was directed by Adam Maciejewski. There had not been much planning or preparation before the surgery, which was performed about one month after the accident, as the transplantation was done as emergency procedure due to the patient's difficulty in eating and breathing. Shortly after the donor's death, the decision to perform the surgery was made and his body was transported hundreds of kilometers to Gliwice once his relatives gave their consent. The doctors believe that their patient has an excellent chance to live a normal, active life after surgery, and that his face should operate more or less normally.

Seven months later, on 4 December, the same Polish medical team in Gliwice transplanted a face onto a 26-year-old female patient with neurofibromatosis. Two months after the operation, she left the hospital.

==== Turkey ====
On 21 January 2012, Turkish surgeon Ömer Özkan and his team successfully performed a full face transplant at Akdeniz University's hospital in Antalya. The 19-year-old patient, Uğur Acar, sustained severe burns as a baby. The donor was 39-year-old Ahmet Kaya, who died on 20 January. The Turkish doctors declared that his body had accepted the new tissue.

Almost one month later on 24 February 2012, a surgical team led by Serdar Nasır conducted the country's second successful full-face transplant at Hacettepe University's hospital in Ankara on 25-year-old Cengiz Gül. The patient's face sustained severe burns when he was two years old. The donor was an undisclosed 40-year-old deceased individual.

On 16 May 2012, Özkan and his team performed the country's fourth and their second full facial transplantation. The face and ears of 27-year-old patient Turan Çolak from İzmir were burnt when he fell into an oven when he was three and half years old. The donor was Tevfik Yılmaz, a 19-year-old man from Uşak who had been declared brain-dead in the evening hours of 15 May after having been in intensive care for seven days.

On 18 July 2013, a donor's face was successfully transplanted onto a Turkish man in a transplant performed by Özkan, at the Akdeniz University hospital following a 6.5-hour operation, making it the fifth such operation to take place in the country. It was the 25th facial transplantation in the world. The donor was Andrzej Kucza, a 42-year-old Polish tourist who was declared brain-dead following a heart attack on 14 July while swimming in Turkey's sea resort Muğla. The receiver was 27-year-old patient Recep Sert from Bursa.

On 23 August 2013, Özkan and his team performed the sixth face transplant surgery in Turkey. Salih Üstün (54) received the scalp, eyelids, jaw and maxilla, nose and the half tongue of 31-year-old Muhittin Turan, who was declared brain-dead after a motorcycle accident that took place two days before.

On 30 December 2013, Özkan and his team conducted their fifth and Turkey's seventh face transplant surgery. The nose, upper lip, upper jaw and maxilla of brain-dead Ali Emre Küçük, aged 34, were successfully transplanted to 22-year-old Recep Kaya, whose face was severely injured in a shotgun accident. While Kaya was flown from Kırklareli to Antalya via Istanbul in four hours, the donor's organs were transported from Edirne by air ambulance. The surgery took 4 hours and 10 minutes.

==== United Kingdom ====
In 2003, a team at London's Royal Free Hospital claimed they were ready to complete the first face transplant procedure globally. However, because of ethical and procedural concerns, the Royal College of Surgeons of England launched the 'Working Party on face transplantation'. They concluded against these surgeries until further issues were solved.

In October 2006, surgeon Peter Butler at London's Royal Free Hospital in the UK was given permission by the NHS ethics board to carry out face transplants. His team were to select four adult patients (children cannot be selected due to concerns over consent), with operations being carried out at six-month intervals.

As of 2022, neither Butler nor any other UK surgeon has performed a face transplant.

==== United States ====
In 2004, the Cleveland Clinic became the first institution to approve this surgery and test it on cadavers.

In 2005, the Cleveland Clinic became the first US hospital to approve the procedure. In December 2008, a team at the Cleveland Clinic, led by Maria Siemionow and including a group of supporting doctors and six plastic surgeons (Steven Bernard, Dr Mark Hendrickson, Robert Lohman, Dan Alam and Francis Papay) performed the first face transplant in the US on a woman named Connie Culp. It was the world's first near-total facial transplant and the fourth known facial transplant to have been successfully performed to date. This operation was the first facial transplant known to have included bones, along with muscle, skin, blood vessels, and nerves. The woman received a nose, most of the sinuses around the nose, the upper jaw, and even some teeth from a deceased donor. As doctors recovered the donor's facial tissue, they paid special attention to maintaining arteries, veins, and nerves, as well as soft tissue and bony structures. The surgeons then connected facial graft vessels to the patient's blood vessels in order to restore blood circulation in the reconstructed face before connecting arteries, veins and nerves in the 22-hour procedure. She had sustained injuries to the extent that she could no longer eat or breathe independently, which had left her without a nose, right eye or upper jaw. Doctors hoped the operation would allow her to regain her sense of smell and ability to smile, and said she had a "clear understanding" of the risks involved. Connie died 29 July 2020 because of an unrelated infection.

The second partial face transplant in the US took place at Brigham and Women's Hospital in Boston on 9 April 2009. During a 17-hour operation, a surgical team led by Bohdan Pomahač, replaced the nose, upper lip, cheeks, and roof of the mouth – along with corresponding muscles, bones and nerves – of James Maki, age 59. Maki's face was severely injured after falling onto the electrified third rail at a Boston subway station in 2005. In May 2009, he made a public media appearance and declared he was happy with the result. This procedure was also shown in the eighth episode of the ABC documentary series, Boston Med.

The first full face transplant performed in the US was done on a construction worker named Dallas Wiens in March 2011. He was burned in an electrical accident in 2008. This operation, performed by Bohdan Pomahač and BWH plastic surgery team, was paid for with the help of the US defence department. They hope to learn from this procedure and use what they learn to help soldiers with facial injuries. One of the top benefits of the surgery was that Dallas regained his sense of smell.

The BWH team led by Bohdan Pomahač, performed another face transplant, this time on Mitch Hunter of Speedway, Indiana. Hunter was a passenger in a single cab pick-up truck, upon exiting the vehicle and pulling another passenger off a downed line, Hunter was then struck by high voltage. The electricity entered his lower left leg, with the majority exiting his face, leaving him with severe burns. He also lost part of his lower left leg, below the knee, and lost two digits on his right hand (pinkie and ring finger). Hunter has regained almost 100% of his normal sensation back in his face and his only complaint is that he looks too much like his older brother.

57-year-old Charla Nash sustained injuries caused by an attack from a chimpanzee named Travis in 2009 after the owner gave the chimp Xanax and wine. She underwent a 20-hour full face transplant in May 2011 at Brigham and Women's Hospital in Boston. Nash's full-face transplant was the third surgery of its kind performed in the United States, all at the same hospital.

In March 2012, a face transplant was completed at the University of Maryland Medical Center and R Adams Cowley Shock Trauma Center under the leadership of plastic surgeon Eduardo Rodriguez and his team (Amir Dorafshar, Michael Christy, Branko Bojovic and Daniel Borsuk). The recipient was 37-year-old Richard Norris, who had sustained a facial gunshot injury in 1997. This transplant included all facial and anterior neck skin, both jaws, and the tongue.

In September 2014, another face transplant was performed by the Cleveland Clinic group. The patient had had complex trauma that masked the development of a rare type of autoimmune disease (granulomatosis with polyangiitis and pyoderma gangrenosum) affecting the face. It was the first face transplant in a patient with an autoimmune disease involving the craniofacial region. Prior to surgery, an analysis of kidney transplant outcomes in granulomatosis with polyangiitis was conducted to evaluate allograft outcomes in these cohorts. The literature established feasibility and encouraged the Cleveland Clinic team to proceed with the surgery. The intervention was reported successful up to three years post-transplantation.

In August 2015, a face transplant was completed at the NYU Langone Medical Center under the leadership of the chair of plastic surgery Eduardo D. Rodriguez and his team. A 41-year-old retired fireman named Patrick Hardison received the face of cyclist David Rodebaugh.

In June 2016, a multidisciplinary team of surgeons, physicians and other health professionals completed a near-total face transplant at Mayo Clinic's Rochester campus. Andrew Sandness, a 32-year-old from eastern Wyoming, had devastating facial injuries from a self-inflicted gunshot wound in 2006. The surgery, which spanned more than 50 hours, restored Sandness' nose, upper and lower jaw, palate, teeth, cheeks, facial muscles, oral mucosa, some of the salivary glands and the skin of his face (from below the eyelids to the neck and from ear to ear). The care team led by Samir Mardini, and Hatem Amer, the surgical director and medical director, respectively, for the Mayo Clinic Essam and Dalal Obaid Center for Reconstructive Transplant Surgery, devoted more than 50 Saturdays over 3 1/2 years to rehearsing the surgery, using cadavers to practice the procedure. They used 3-D imaging and virtual surgery to plot out the bony cuts so the donor's face would fit perfectly on the transplant recipient. Today, in addition to his physical transformation, Sandness can smell again, breathe normally and eat foods that were off-limits for a decade.

In a 31-hour operation starting on 4 May 2017, surgeons at the Cleveland Clinic transplanted a face donated by Adrea Schneider, to Katie Stubblefield, whose face had been sustained severe injuries caused by gunshot wound on 25 March 2014. As of 2018, Katie is the youngest person in the United States to have had a face transplant, aged 21 at the time. Surgeons originally planned to leave her cheeks, eyebrows, eyelids, most of her forehead, and the sides of her face alone. However, because the donor face was larger and darker than Katie's, they made the decision to transplant the donor's full face. This holds an increased risk of acute rejection in which case, the face must be removed. She did not have enough tissue for reconstructive surgery. Katie was featured on the cover of National Geographic in September 2018 for an article entitled "The Story of a Face."

In July 2019, 68-year-old Robert Chelsea became the oldest person, as well as the first black person in the world, to receive a full-face transplant. On 6 August 2013, Robert was involved in a car accident, leaving burns over 75% of his body. The severe injuries meant that Robert was missing significant facial elements such as a part of his nose, which limited his ability to eat and drink. Functionality was important to Robert and was a key reason behind his pursuit of the surgery. In 2016, a face transplant was first discussed. Yet, health care disparities have led to a lack of black organ donations. This meant that Robert had to wait for two years to find a face that matched something close to his own complexion. The surgery was performed on 27 July 2019 at Brigham and Women's Hospital.

In February 2024, 30-year-old Derek Pfaff received a full-face transplant from an anonymous donor. Pfaff had previously sustained a gunshot wound in March 2014, 10 years prior to the surgery. The results of the surgery were later revealed in November 2024.

=== Combined procedures ===
A number of combined VCA procedures, such as bilateral hand transplants, have been described in the literature and media sources. These combined procedures also include attempts at triple-limb and quadruple-limb transplants, however, only three face transplants have been attempted in combination with other allografts.

==== France ====
In 2009, Laurent Lantieri and his team attempted a face and bilateral hand transplant on a 37-year-old man who sustained extensive injuries during a self-immolation attempt one year prior. The patient ultimately died of anoxic brain injury two months after his initial transplant during surgical management of infectious and vascular complications. Autopsy revealed no signs of rejection in any of the allografts.

==== United States ====
On 12 August 2020, at NYU Langone Health in New York, Eduardo D. Rodriguez led a team of over 140 personnel in successfully transplanting the face and bilateral hands of a brain-dead donor onto 22-year-old Joe DiMeo, who sustained substantial burns after a car accident in 2018. The procedure lasted approximately 23 hours, and involved the entire facial soft tissue (extending from the anterior hairline to the neck, including the eyelids, nose, lips, and ears, along with strategic skeletal components), as well as both hands at the distal forearm level.

Charla Nash's face transplant (discussed above) also initially included bilateral hands from the same donor. Circulation to Nash's transplanted hands was compromised after she was started on vasopressors as part of treatment for sepsis. The hands were ultimately amputated, however the patient survived, as did her facial allograft.

In May 2023, a team of 140 doctors at NYU Langone Health successfully conducted the first combination eye transplant and partial face transplant. The patient, a 46-year-old linesman, was electrocuted by high voltage wires in 2021 causing the loss of the lower portion of his face and his left eye. The eye, while not restoring vision to the patient, has successfully received blood flow to the retina.

== Ethics, surgery and post-operation treatment ==
The procedure consists of a series of operations requiring rotating teams of specialists. With issues of tissue type, age, sex, and skin color taken into consideration, the patient's face is removed and replaced (sometimes including the underlying fat, nerves, blood vessels, bones, and/or musculature). The surgery may last anywhere from 8 to 36 hours, followed by a 10- to 14-day hospital stay.

There has been a substantial amount of ethical debate surrounding the operation and its performance. The main issue is that, as noted below, the procedure entails submitting often otherwise physically healthy people to potentially fatal, lifelong immunosuppressant therapy. So far, four people have died of complications related to the procedure. Citing the comments of various plastic surgeons and medical professionals from France and Mexico, anthropologist Samuel Taylor-Alexander suggests that the operation has been infused with nationalist import, which is ultimately influencing the decision-making and ethical judgements of the involved parties. His most recent research suggests the face transplant community needs to do more in order to ensure that the experiential knowledge of face transplant recipients is included in the ongoing evaluation of the field.

After the procedure, a lifelong regimen of immunosuppressive drugs is necessary to suppress the patient's own immune systems and prevent rejection. Long-term immunosuppression increases the risk of developing life-threatening infections, kidney damage, and cancer. The surgery may result in complications such as infections that could damage the transplanted face and require a second transplant or reconstruction with skin grafts.
