= Pneumosinus dilatans =

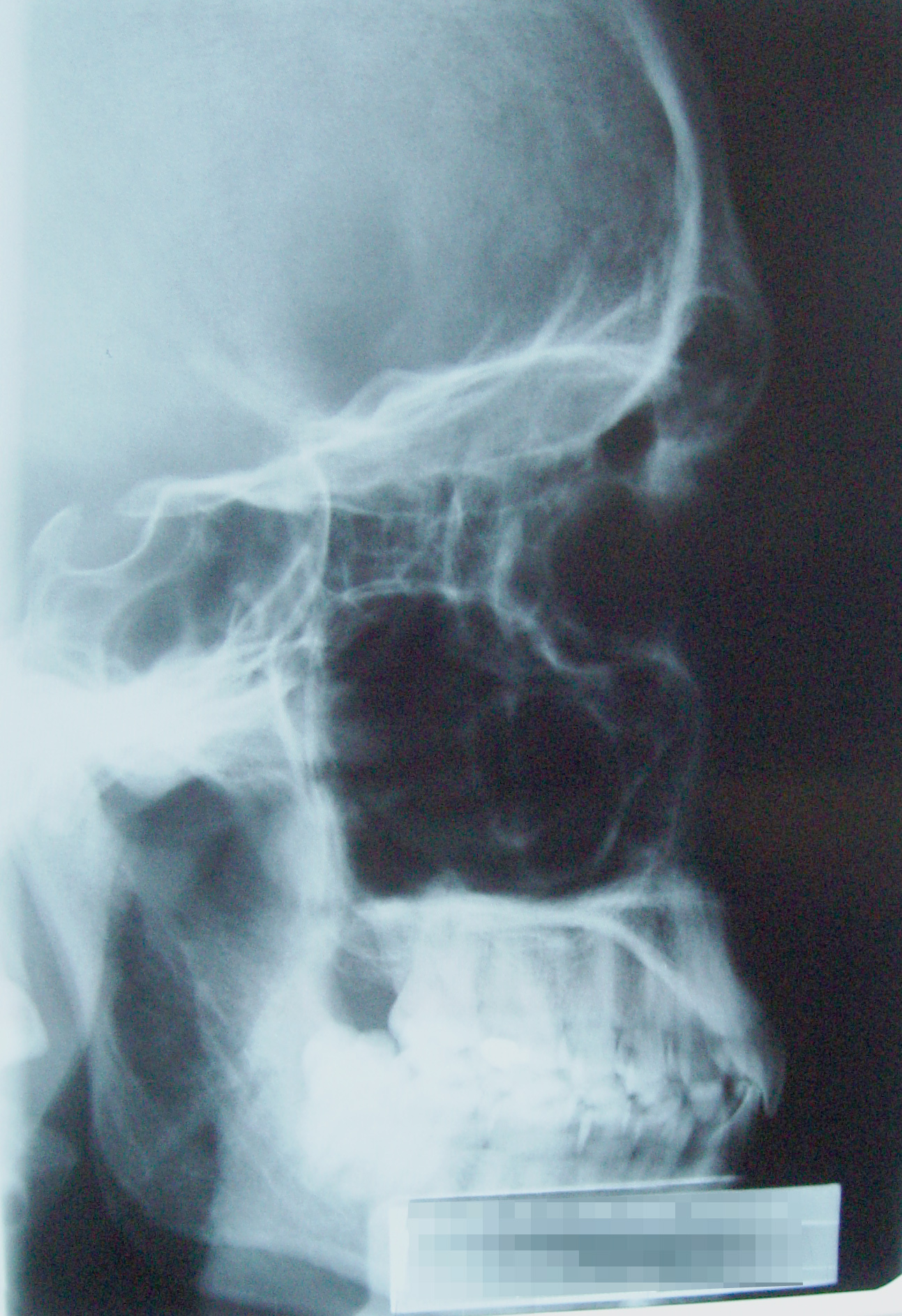
- Lateral view paranasal sinus

Pneumosinus dilatans is a rare, generally benign, asymptomatic disease of unknown etiology that is characterized by the enlargement of one or more paranasal sinuses without any sign of bone loss or pathological alterations to the mucosa beneath.

== Signs and symptoms ==
The displaced structures are usually associated with clinical symptoms. The typical symptoms of outward expansion are prominence of the supraorbital ridge and frontal bossing. The expansion could be focused on the orbit, nose, and other sinuses, or it could go intracranially. Sinus pressure, diplopia, ocular abnormalities, anosmia, and headache are associated symptoms.

== Causes ==
It's still unknown what causes pneumosinus dilatans and how it progresses.

== Diagnosis ==
Clinical examination is used to make the diagnosis, and radiography (plain film or CT) is used to confirm it when the characteristic sinus enlargement is observed.
