= Bernard Devauchelle =

French oral and maxillofacial surgeon

Bernard Devauchelle is a French oral and maxillofacial surgeon, best known for successfully completing the first face transplant in November 2005 at Amiens University Hospital.
