= Maria Siemionow =

Polish surgeon

- Born: Maria Zofia Siemionow; 3 May 1950 (age 76); Krotoszyn, Poland
- Education: Poznań University of Medical Sciences
- Known for: First near-total face transplant in the United States
- Scientific career
- Fields: Medicine plastic surgery
- Workplaces: University of Louisville School of Medicine; University of Illinois Chicago

Maria Zofia Siemionow (born 3 May 1950 in Krotoszyn, Poland) is a Polish transplant surgeon and scientist. She is known for leading a team of eight surgeons through the first near-total face transplant performed in the United States at the Cleveland Clinic in 2008. The patient, Connie Culp, a 45-year-old woman from a small town in Ohio, was exceedingly disfigured by a close range shotgun blast in 2004. The procedure took 22 hours.

Siemionow practiced in Cleveland until 2014 when she was appointed Professor of Orthopedics and Director of Microsurgery Research at The University of Illinois, Chicago, IL, where she practices today. She is regarded as a world leader in nerve regeneration enhancement and in developing minimal immunosuppression regimens following transplantation.

== Education ==
Born in Krotoszyn, Poland, in 1950, she earned her medical degree from Poznan Medical Academy in 1974, Poznan, Poland, and completed a residency in orthopedics there. She earned her Ph.D. in microsurgery from the same institution in 1985 and "habilitation" in medical sciences in 1992. In 2007 the president of Poland, Lech Kaczyński, honored her with the title of professor. She specializes in microsurgery, hand surgery, peripheral nerve surgery, transplantation and microsurgery research.

== Career ==
Dr. Siemionow worked as an Associate Professor of Surgery at the University of Utah in 1990. Siemionow was named Director of Plastic Surgery Research and Head of Microsurgical Training in the Cleveland Clinic's Department of Plastic Surgery in 1995 and served in that capacity until 2013. She was appointed Professor of Surgery in the Department of Surgery at the Cleveland Clinic Lerner College of Medicine of Case Western Reserve University in 2005.

In 2003 Siemionow completed the first facial transplant on rats paving the way for the first US human face transplant which she undertook in 2008. That same year she received an honorary academic appointment as Professor of Surgery at the Karol Marcinkowski University of Medical Sciences in Poznan, Poland.

She is President of the American Society for Reconstructive Transplantation and is past president of the International Hand and Composite Tissue Allotransplantation Society and the American Society for Peripheral Nerve. She is a member of the Warrior Restoration Consortium, an academic-industry team focused on developing new treatments for wounded soldiers.

== Awards ==
Siemionow has received the Commander's Cross of the Order of Merit of the Republic of Poland (presented by Ambassador Robert Kupiecki) for her contribution to the development of microsurgery and transplantation medicine. She was twice honored with the James Barrett Brown Award for best publication in a plastic surgery journal in 2004 and 2007. She also received the Folkert Belzeer Award in Transplantation for her work on transplantation and tolerance at the 6th Congress of the International Society for Organ Sharing in 2001. She is a recipient of the 2009 Cleveland Clinic Learner Research Award for Excellence for her transplantation research. Recent awards include the Polish Order of Merit (2009), the Commander's Cross Polonia Restituta award given by the President of Poland (2009), the American Association of Plastic Surgeons' Clinical Researcher of the Year Award (2010) and the Outstanding Achievement in Clinical Research Award from the Plastic Surgery Educational Foundation (2010).

Siemionow's international awards include the SAPIENTI SAT Medal endorsed by the Ministry of Education of Poland (2012), the Casimir Funk National Science Award (2013), and the Honoris Causa Doctorat given by the Poznan University of Medical Sciences (2013). In 2014, she received the Great Immigrants Award from the Carnegie Foundation of New York. In 2015 she was awarded the Golden Hipolit statue by the Hipolit Cegielski Foundation, Poznan, Poland. She is a member of the Kosciuszko Foundation Collegium of Eminent Scientists of Polish Origin and Ancestry (2014).

In May 2020, Siemionow was featured on The Times 'Science Power List'.

== Bibliography ==
Siemionow has over 330 scientific publications. She has edited multiple plastic surgery textbooks, one popular science book, and has contributed to 90 published book chapters. She is on the editorial board of nine professional society journals and is an ad hoc reviewer for six professional society journals. Some of her contributions are:

- The Know-How of Face Transplantation
- Plastic and Reconstructive Surgery
- Face to Face: My Quest to Perform the First Full Face Transplant
- Transplanting a Face: Notes on a Life in Medicine
- Tissue Surgery (New Techniques in Surgery Series)
