= List of organ transplant donors and recipients =

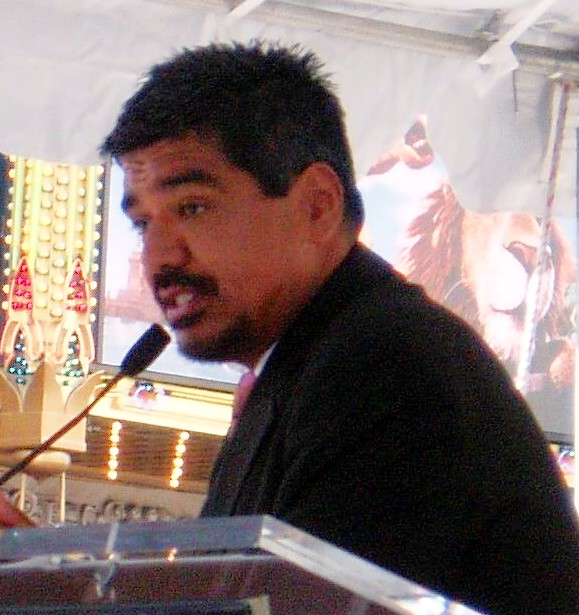
George Lopez had a kidney transplant.

This list of notable organ transplant donors and recipients includes people who were the first to undergo certain organ transplant procedures, or who made significant contributions to their chosen field, and who have either donated or received an organ transplant at some point in their lives, as confirmed by public information.

The list in this article can give the impression that disease can only be solved in ~35 (see list below) of the ~90 organs in the human body (see List of organs of the human body). Thinking of whole organ transplant as the only commonly used method of transplantation against disease is incorrect, as often only a part of the organ (tissue) is transplanted. A few examples are:

- Hematopoietic stem cell / bone marrow transplant for leukemia
- Corneal epithelial (limbal stem cell) transplantation against, against severe ocular‑surface disorders
- Islet of Langerhans transplantation against Type 1 diabetes mellitus

== Survival statistics ==
Survival statistics depend greatly on the age of donor, age of recipient, skill of the transplant center, compliance of the recipient, whether the organ came from a living or deceased donor and overall health of the recipient. Median survival rates can be quite misleading, especially for the relatively small sample that is available for these organs. Survival rates improve almost yearly, due to improved techniques and medications. This example is from the United Network of Organ Sharing (UNOS), the USA umbrella organization for transplant centers. Up-to-date data can be obtained from the UNOS website.

Transplant Type	Median survival
Liver transplant	16 years
Heart transplant	10 years
Kidney transplant	16 years

== Notable first procedures ==
=== Suggestion for how the Original lists could be formatted into 1 ===
Notable Early and First Transplant Procedures (Almost Chronologically Sorted)
No.	Procedure	Doctor in charge of transplant	Name of recipient	Organ donated by	Comments	Date of transplant	Country where the operation took place	Survival / outcome	Reference
20	Esophagus reconstruction (autologous)	Dr. Dan Gavriliu	Unnamed	Autologous (patient's stomach)	First use of stomach to reconstruct esophagus	1951-04-20		Survived	Dan Gavriliu
26	Hair transplant (punch graft technique)	Dr. Norman Orentreich	Unnamed male	Autologous (own scalp)	First modern hair transplant; technique still in use	1952-01-01		Permanent hair growth	
3	First human kidney transplant	Joseph Murray	Richard Herrick	Ronald Herrick (twin brother)	—	1954-12-23	USA	Approx. 8 years	
22	Fecal microbiota transplant (FMT)	Dr. Ben Eiseman	Unnamed (4 patients)	Healthy donor stool	Used to treat pseudomembranous colitis	1958-01-01		Symptoms resolved	
4	First human liver transplant	Thomas Starzl	—	—	First transplant was unsuccessful; the first successful liver transplant was performed four years later	1963-01-01	USA	—	
5	First human lung transplant	James D. Hardy	—	—	First transplant was unsuccessful; first successful lung transplant was in 1983 by Joel Cooper	1963-01-01		—	
9	First human pancreas transplant	Richard Lillehei and William Kelly	Anonymous young woman	—	Patient survived ~4.5 months; died of lung infection	1966-12-16	USA	~4.5 months	
6	First human heart transplant	Christiaan Barnard	Louis Washkansky	Denise Darvall	Washkansky survived only 18 days	1967-12-03		18 days	
16	Larynx transplant	Dr. Marshall Strome	Tim Heidler	Deceased donor	First larynx transplant with speech recovery	1998-01-01		Yes	
8	First human hand transplant	Earl Owen and Jean-Michel Dubernard	Clint Hallam	—	Hand was removed by request of recipient after ~2.5 years	1998-09-23		—	
21	Esophagus transplant (experimental)	Dr. Francisco T. A. Leite et al.	Unnamed	Deceased donor / synthetic scaffold	Experimental in early 2000s; not standard	~2003–2011		Short-term survival	NIH
10	First partial human face transplant	Jean-Michel Dubernard and Bernard Devauchelle	Isabelle Dinoire	—	Body rejected parts of the graft; died due to complications and cancer	2005-11-27		10 years	
18	Full face transplant	Dr. Joan Pere Barret	Óscar (surname withheld)	Deceased donor	First full face transplant (previous were partial)	2010-03-01		Yes	
23	Gut microbiota transplant (approved therapy)	Various (clinical trials)	Various	Healthy donor stool	Became FDA-approved for C. difficile	2013-01-01		Cure rate 80–90%	FDA
14	Uterus transplant (live birth)	Dr. Mats Brännström	Unnamed	Living donor	First successful live birth after uterus transplant	2014-01-01		Yes	
12	First human penis transplant	—	21-year-old male	—	Performed after amputation due to circumcision complications	2014-12-01		—	
15	Penis + Scrotum + Abdominal Wall	Dr. W.P. Andrew Lee (Johns Hopkins)	Unnamed US veteran	Deceased donor	First transplant including external genitalia and abdominal wall	2018-01-01		Yes	
17	Trachea transplant	Dr. Eric Genden	Sonia Sein	Cadaveric donor	First long-segment trachea transplant	2021-01-01		Yes	
24	Synthetic/defined bacterial therapy	Finch, Seres Therapeutics	Various	Lab-grown bacteria	First FDA-approved microbiome therapy (Rebyota, Vowst)	2023-01-01		Approved (ongoing monitoring)	FDA
13	First xenotransplant (human heart from pig)	—	David Bennett Sr.	Genetically modified pig	First gene-edited pig heart to human; patient died ~2 months later	2024-01-01		2 months	
7	First heart and lung transplant	—	Brenda Barber	—	UK's first successful heart-lung transplant	1984		10 years	
19	Small intestine (bowel) transplant	Dr. Rainer W. G. Gruessner	Unnamed	Deceased donor	First successful small bowel transplant	1988, Germany		Yes	
11	First transplant of a human organ grown from adult stem cells	—	—		First stem cell-derived organ transplant	—			
27	Veins	—	—	—	—	2000s		—	
28	Thyroid	Patient with autoimmune adrenal insufficiency + diabetes	Deceased donor, adrenal graft en bloc with kidney	First reported simultaneous kidney–adrenal gland–pancreas transplantation (i.e., adrenal graft as part of composite)	—	2013 (report published)		—	
29	Adreanal gland	Dr. Rainer W.G. Gruessner	—	—	—	—		—	
29	Spleen	Dr. Tomoaki Kato and Dr. Andreas Tzakis	—	—	—	—		—	
30	Bladder	Dr. Nima Nassiri and Dr. Inderbir Gill	Oscar Larrainzar	—	First-in-human bladder transplant. Procedure was part of a UCLA clinical trial.	May 4, 2025		—	
31	Arterie	—	—	—	—	2000s		—	
32	Nerves	—	—	—	—	—		—	
33	Tongue								
34	Teeth								

=== AOriginal lists ===
Procedure	Doctor in charge of transplant	Name of recipient	Organ donated by	Comments	Date of transplant	Survival	Reference
Nasal reconstruction (forehead flap)	Sushruta (ancient India)	Unnamed	Autologous tissue (forehead skin and flap)	Very early documented reconstruction using skin and tissue transfer; not a modern graft with blood supply restoration	Estimated ~1500–1000 BC	N/A (historical)	Various historical texts including Sushruta Samhita
First corneal transplant	Eduard Zirm	Alois Glogar	Karl Brauer		December 7, 1905		
First human kidney transplant	Joseph Murray	Richard Herrick	Ronald Herrick (twin brother)		December 23, 1954	Approx. 8 years	
First human liver transplant	Thomas Starzl			First transplant was unsuccessful. The first successful liver transplant was performed by Starzl four years later.	1963		
First human lung transplant	James D. Hardy			First transplant was unsuccessful. The first successful lung transplant was performed in 1983 by Joel Cooper.	1963		
First human heart transplant	Christiaan Barnard	Louis Washkansky	Denise Darvall	Transplant was only good for 18 days. Washkansky died on December 21, 1967.	December 3, 1967	18 days	
First Heart and Lung Transplant		Brenda Barber		1984 - UK's first successful heart and lung transplant	1984	10 years	
First human hand transplant	Earl Owen and Jean-Michel Dubernard	Clint Hallam		The transplanted hand was removed at request of recipient after about two and a half years on February 2, 2001.	September 23, 1998		
First human pancreas transplant	Richard Lillehei and William Kelly	Anonymous "young woman"		Patient survived for 4 1/2 months and died in May 1967 of a lung infection and pneumonia.	December 16, 1966		
First partial human face transplant	Jean-Michel Dubernard and Bernard Devauchelle	Isabelle Dinoire		Dinoire's body rejected the transplant in 2015 and she lost part of the use of her lips. The daily immunosuppressive drugs she was required to take left her vulnerable to cancer which later claimed her life.	November 27, 2005	10 years	
First transplant of a human organ grown from adult stem cells							
First human penis transplant				Transplant was done to a 21-year-old male with penis amputation due to problem of circumcision before.	December 2014		
First Human Heart Transplant with non human heart/XenoTransplantation		David Bennett Sr.		Genetically modified pig. Done At Maryland University Medical School.	January 2024	2 months	

Procedure	Doctor in charge of transplant	Name of recipient	Organ donated by	Comments	Date of transplant	Survival	Reference
Uterus	Dr. Mats Brännström	Unnamed	Living donor	First live birth after uterus transplant	2014, Sweden	Yes	https://www.gu.se/en/news/worlds-first-child-born-after-uterus-transplantation
Penis + Scrotum + Abdominal Wall	Dr. W.P. Andrew Lee (Johns Hopkins)	Unnamed U.S. veteran	Deceased donor	First extensive transplant including genitalia and lower abdominal wall (scrotum transplanted, no testicles to avoid donor DNA)	2018, Johns Hopkins (USA)	Yes	https://www.hopkinsmedicine.org/news/newsroom/news-releases/johns-hopkins-performs-first-total-penis-and-scrotum-transplant-in-the-world
Larynx	Dr. Marshall Strome	Tim Heidler	Deceased donor	First successful human larynx transplant with speech recovery	1998, Cleveland Clinic, USA	Yes	https://link.springer.com/article/10.1007/BF02714347
Trachea	Dr. Eric Genden	Sonia Sein	Cadaveric donor	First long-segment trachea transplant using cadaveric donor segment	2021, Mount Sinai, USA	Yes	https://www.anesthesiologynews.com/Clinical-Anesthesiology/Article/05-21/Mount-Sinai-Team-Performs-First-Successful-Trachea-Transplant/63367
Full Face	Dr. Joan Pere Barret	Óscar (surname withheld)	Deceased donor	First full face transplant (previous were partial)	March 2010, Barcelona, Spain	Yes	https://www.guinnessworldrecords.com/world-records/first-full-face-transplant
Small Intestine (Bowel)	Dr. Rainer W. G. Gruessner	Unnamed	Deceased donor	First successful small bowel transplant	1988, Kiel, Germany	Yes	https://www.medscape.com/viewarticle/873619

Procedure	Doctor in charge of transplant	Name of recipient	Organ donated by	Comments	Date of transplant	Survival / outcome	Reference
Esophagus (reconstruction using stomach tissue)	Dr. Dan Gavriliu	Unnamed	Autologous (patient's stomach)	First successful surgical replacement of the esophagus using stomach to bypass esophageal damage	April 20, 1951, Romania	Patient survived; procedure became a surgical milestone in GI reconstruction	
Esophagus (cadaveric transplant – experimental)	Dr. Francisco T. A. Leite et al.	Unnamed (human and animal models)	Deceased donor / synthetic scaffold	Experimental donor/synthetic esophagus transplants began in early 2000s; mixed results, not standard practice	~2003–2011 (experimental phase)	Short-term survival in some animal/human trials; long-term failure due to graft necrosis	NIH
Fecal Microbiota Transplant (FMT)	Dr. Ben Eiseman	Unnamed (4 patients)	Healthy donor stool	First modern recorded FMT to treat pseudomembranous colitis	1958, USA	All 4 patients had resolution of colitis symptoms; long-term survival not documented	Eiseman B. et al., Surgery, 1958
Gut microbiota transplant (clinical approval)	Various (standardized trials)	Various	Healthy donor stool	FMT became clinically accepted treatment for recurrent Clostridioides difficile	2013 FDA guidance; widespread in 2010s	Cure rate of ~80–90% in clinical trials; patients followed for months to years	FDA
Synthetic/Defined Bacterial Consortium Therapy	Finch Therapeutics, Seres Therapeutics	Various	Lab-grown bacterial cultures (no donor stool)	First FDA-approved live biotherapeutics for microbiome restoration (e.g., Rebyota, Vowst)	2023, USA	Approved after trials showing reduced recurrence of infection at 8 weeks; long-term monitoring ongoing	FDA Approval – Rebyota, Vowst
Blood transfusion (first successful)	Dr. James Blundell	Unnamed woman (postpartum hemorrhage)	Human donor (husband)	First successful human-to-human blood transfusion	1818, London, UK	Patient survived initial hemorrhage; long-term outcome not recorded	BMJ – Blundell's work
Hair transplant (punch graft technique)	Dr. Norman Orentreich	Unnamed male patient with male pattern baldness	Autologous (back of patient's scalp)	First modern hair transplant using punch grafting, basis for modern technique	1952, USA	Grafts were retained permanently; patient showed sustained hair growth for decades	Orentreich N. 1959

== Notable recipients ==
=== Multiple organ transplant ===
Penis + scrotum + abdominal wall	Dr. W.P. Andrew Lee (Johns Hopkins)	Unnamed U.S. veteran	Deceased donor	First extensive transplant including genitalia and lower abdominal wall (scrotum transplanted, no testicles to avoid donor DNA)	2018, Johns Hopkins (USA)	Yes

=== Corneal transplant ===
Name	Life	Comments	Date of transplant	Survival	Reference
Mandy Patinkin	(1952–)	Actor. He suffered from keratoconus, a degenerative eye disease, in the mid-1990s. This led to two corneal transplants; his right cornea in 1997, and his left in 1998.	1997, 1998		
Nicholas Currie, also known as Momus	(1960–)	Scottish musician, journalist, and performance artist. Underwent transplant after infection from acanthamoeba keratitis, resulting in improved vision.	1999		

=== Heart transplants ===
See also Category:Heart transplant recipients

Name	Life	Comments	Date of transplant	Survival	Reference
Robert Altman	(1925–2006)	Film director. Announced the transplant at the 78th Academy Awards in 2005 while accepting his Lifetime Achievement Oscar. Altman said, "I'm here under false pretenses … Eleven years ago I had a heart transplant, a total heart transplant. I got the heart of, I think, a young woman who was in about in her late thirties. By that kind of calculation you may be giving this award too early because I think I've got about 40 years left."	1995	11 years	
Kurtis Blow	(1959–)	Rapper. He received a heart transplant on December 6, 2020.	2020		
Robert P. Casey	(1932–2000)	41st governor of Pennsylvania. He announced that he needed a rare heart/liver transplant due to a rare genetic condition in which proteins invade and destroy major bodily organs. Shortly after the announcement, Casey received the heart and liver of a 35-year-old African-American male who was killed in an auto accident near Erie, Pennsylvania. The short time between the announcement and the operation led to accusations that Casey was secretly placed on the top of the waiting list, along with sparking an urban legend that the donor was "killed" by the Pennsylvania State Police in order to "harvest" his organs.	1993	6 years	
Dick Cheney	(1941–2025)	Vice President of the United States 2001–2009. Received his heart transplant on March 24, 2012, at Inova Fairfax Hospital	March 24, 2012	13 years	
Erik Compton	(1979–)	American professional golfer	1992, 2008		
Glen Gondrezick	(1953–2009)	American basketball player, formerly in the NBA, and broadcaster.	September 20, 2008	7 months	
Jonathan Hardy	(1940–2012)	New Zealand actor. Starred as voice of Rygel on Farscape; wrote the screenplay for Breaker Morant and was nominated for an Academy Award.	1988	24 years	
Billy T. James	(1948–1991)	New Zealand comedian and entertainer.	1989	2 years	
Simon Keith	(1965–)	British Professional Footballer. Recognized as the first athlete to play a professional sport after undergoing a heart transplant.	1986, 2019	35 years	
Eddie Large	(1941–2020)	British comedian. One half of the comedy duo Little and Large.	2002	18 years	
Mussum	(1941–1994)	Brazilian actor, singer and comedian.	July 12, 1994	17 days	
Norton Nascimento	(1962–2007)	Brazilian actor.	December 19, 2003	4 years	
Kelly Perkins	(1961–)	Author and noted world-class mountain climber who has set world records as the first ever heart transplant recipient to scale the most famous mountains in the world.	1995		
Jerry Richardson	(1938–2023)	American businessman and principal owner of the NFL's Carolina Panthers.	February 1, 2009	14 years	
Sandro	(1945–2010)	Argentine singer and actor. He died after complications of a heart–lung transplant.	November 20, 2009	45 days	
Carroll Shelby	(1923–2012)	American entrepreneur famous for his race car driving and automotive developments in designing the cult-classic Shelby Cobras and Ford's Shelby Mustang. Carroll Shelby received a heart transplant in 1990, then in 1996, a living donor kidney transplant from his son. Carroll died May 10, 2012, at the age of 89.	Heart: 1990; Kidney: 1996	Heart: 22 years; Kidney: 16 years	
Cal Stoll	(1923–2000)	American football player and coach.	Heart: 1987	Heart: 13 years	
Frank Torre	(1931–2014)	American baseball player, brother of Joe Torre.	Heart: 1996; Kidney: 2007	Heart: 18 years; Kidney: 7 years	

=== Kidney transplants ===
See also Category:Kidney transplant recipients

Name	Life	Comments	Date of transplant	Survival	Reference
Erma Bombeck	(1927–1996)	Comedian. Diagnosed with polycystic kidney disease. She was on the transplant list prior to her diagnosis with breast cancer, and was removed from the list while being treated as is standard procedure. She was placed back on the list after her treatment was completed, and died from complications of the transplant surgery.	April 3, 1996	20 days	
Steven Cojocaru	(1965–)	Fashion critic and member of Entertainment Tonight. In November 2004 he announced that he was suffering from polycystic kidney disease and would require a kidney transplant. He underwent transplant surgery on January 14, 2005, after his friend Abby Finer donated one of her kidneys. Later, the kidney became infected by a virus, and in June 2005 he underwent a second operation to have the new kidney removed. On August 17, he announced that his body was free of the viral infection and that he was ready to find a new transplant. He then received a second kidney transplant, which was donated by his mother.	2005		
Natalie Cole	(1950–2015)	Singer-songwriter	May 20, 2009	6 years	
Gary Coleman	(1968–2010)	Actor who played Arnold on Diff'rent Strokes. Received two separate kidney transplants.	1973, 1984	26 years (second transplant), 37 years (first transplant)	
Prince Daniel, Duke of Västergötland	(1973–)	Prince of Sweden, husband of Victoria, Crown Princess of Sweden and former personal trainer and gym owner. Underwent a kidney transplant at Karolinska University Hospital, his father was the donor.	May 27, 2009		
Lucy Davis	(1973–)	Actress best known for playing the character Dawn Tinsley in the BBC comedy, The Office. Kidney received in 1997, which was donated by her mother.	1997		
Kenny Easley	(1959–)	Former NFL player	June 7, 1990		
Aron Eisenberg	(1969–2019)	Actor, Star Trek: Deep Space Nine	December 29, 2015	4 years	
Sean Elliott	(1968–)	NBA basketball star. The kidney was donated by his brother. Elliott made history by returning to play in the NBA following his surgery.	August 16, 1999		
Selena Gomez	(1992–)	Actress and singer. The kidney was donated by Gomez's best friend, actress Francia Raisa.	2017		
Jennifer Harman	(1964–)	Poker player; only woman to win two open events in the World Series of Poker. Had two separate kidney transplants.	?, 2004		
Ken Howard	(1932–)	English artist who was president of the New English Art Club from 1998 to 2003.	2000		
Ivan Klasnić	(1980–)	Croatian international footballer. After kidney failure in late 2006, he underwent an unsuccessful transplant in January 2007, followed by a successful one from his father two months later. He returned to action with Werder Bremen in November, and played at Euro 2008, becoming the first kidney transplant patient to play in a major football finals.	March 13, 2007		
Jimmy Little	(1937–2012)	Australian country/rock artist.	February 2004	8 years	
Jonah Lomu	(1975–2015)	New Zealand All Blacks rugby union player. The kidney was donated by Wellington radio presenter Grant Kereama. Lomu came back to professional rugby in 2005, though not with his past success.	July 28, 2004	11 years	
George Lopez	(1961–)	Actor-comedian and star of the George Lopez TV series. Kidney transplant from his wife, Ann Lopez, in April 2005	April 2005		
Sarah Hyland	(1990–)	American actress.	April 13, 2012		
Tracy Morgan	(1968–)	American actor and comedian.	December 2010		
Alonzo Mourning	(1970–)	NBA basketball star. Like Elliott, Mourning returned to play in the NBA following his surgery; he retired in January 2009, not having played since 2007 due to a serious leg injury.	December 19, 2003		
Kerry Packer	(1937–2005)	His long-serving helicopter pilot, Nick Ross, donated one of his own kidneys to Packer for transplantation.	2000	5 years	
Charles Perkins	(1936–2000)	Australian soccer player, Aboriginal activist and government minister.	1972	28 years	
Billy Preston	(1946–2006)	An American soul musician from Houston, Texas, raised mostly in Los Angeles, California.	2002	4 years	
Neil Simon	(1927–2018)	His long-time publicist, Bill Evans.	2004	14 years	
Ron Springs	(1956–2011)	Former NFL player. Kidney donated by former Dallas Cowboys teammate Everson Walls.	February 28, 2007	4 years	
Tina Turner	(1939–2023)	Singer and Actress. Kidney donated by husband Erwin Bach.	2014	9 years	

=== Liver transplants ===
See also Category:Liver transplant recipients

Name	Life	Comments	Date of transplant	Survival	Reference
Eric Abidal	(1979–)	French footballer.	April 10, 2012		
Gregg Allman	(1947–2017)	American musician best known as the leader of The Allman Brothers Band.	June 23, 2010	7 years	
George Best	(1946–2005)	Northern Irish football player.	July 30, 2002	3 years	
David Bird	(1959–2014)	American journalist; underwent transplant as a result of contracting hepatitis	2004	10 years	
Jack Bruce	(1943–2014)	British musician most famous as a member of the 1960s band Cream. Diagnosed with liver cancer several months before the transplant.	September 19, 2003	11 years	
Robert P. Casey	(1932–2000)	41st Governor of Pennsylvania. Received new liver during same operation in which he received a new heart.	1993	6 years	
David Crosby	(1941–2023)	Rock-folk musician most famous as a member of The Byrds and Crosby, Stills, & Nash.	November 1994	28 years	
Gerald Durrell	(1925–1995)	Founder of Jersey Zoo, author, television presenter, conservationist	28 March 1994	9 months approx	
Shelley Fabares	(1944–)	Actress and singer who starred on the sitcom Coach.	2000		
Freddy Fender	(1937–2006)	A country, and rock and roll musician. Diagnosed with hepatitis C in 2000.	2004	Approximately 2 years	
Superstar Billy Graham	(1943–)	A former professional wrestler. Had a liver transplant after his was destroyed by hepatitis C, which he suspects was caught through blood spilt during a match.	2002		
Larry Hagman	(1931–2012)	Actor, best known for playing J.R. Ewing on the soap opera Dallas	1995	17 years	
Steve Jobs	(1955–2011)	American businessman; cofounder and CEO of Apple Inc. and former CEO of Pixar. In 2004, he had a cancerous tumor removed from his pancreas.	April 2009	2 years	
Chris Klug	(1972–)	Professional snowboarder who received a liver transplant to treat primary sclerosing cholangitis. Went on to compete in the 2002 Winter Olympics in Salt Lake City. This was the first, and so far only time, a transplantee had competed in the Olympics, either the Winter or Summer Olympics.	2000		
Evel Knievel	(1938–2007)	A stuntperson, best known for his public displays of long distance, high-altitude motorcycle jumping. He had a liver transplant as a result of hepatitis C, which he believed was contracted during an operation.	January 29, 1999	Almost 9 years	
Phil Lesh	(1940–2024)	A musician and a founder member of the band the Grateful Dead, in which he played bass guitar. He was diagnosed with hepatitis C in 1992.	1998	26 years	
Linda Lovelace	(1949–2002)	A pornographic actress, most notable for the movie Deep Throat (1972). She contracted hepatitis C from a blood transfusion after an automobile accident in 1969.	1987	15 years	
Mickey Mantle	(1931–1995)	Hall of Fame baseball player. Mantle died a couple of months later of liver cancer, which spread to his new liver.	1995	2 months	
Jim Nabors	(1930–2017)	Actor-singer-comedian, best known for playing Gomer Pyle in The Andy Griffith Show and its spinoff Gomer Pyle, U.S.M.C.	1994	23 years	
John Phillips	(1935–2001)	Singer, guitarist, and songwriter, best known as founder and leader of The Mamas & the Papas.	1992	Approximately 9 years	
Lou Reed	(1942–2013)	American rock musician and songwriter.	2013	5 months	

=== Lung transplants ===
See also Category:Lung transplant recipients

Name	Life	Comments	Date of transplant	Survival	Reference
Sandro	(1945–2010)	Argentine singer and actor. He died after complications of a heart–lung transplant.	November 20, 2009	45 days	
Ann Harrison	(1944–2001)	Recipient and long term survivor of the world's first human double-lung transplant	November 26, 1986	15 years	
Charity Sunshine Tillemann-Dick	(1983–2019)	American soprano.	September 2009	10 years	

=== Uterine transplants ===
Name	Life	Comments	Date of Transplant	Survival	Reference
Lili Elbe	(1882–1931)	A Danish painter and transgender women, she hoped to be able to conceive kids with her cis male partner. She received a uterus transplant and vaginoplasty, but died from cardiac arrest after post-surgical infection.	1931	3 months	

== Notable donors ==
Name	Life	Comments	Organ(s) donated	Date of transplant	Survival	Reference
Zell Kravinsky	(1954–)	American Investor known for donating over $45 million of his personal wealth to charity. Donated kidney to a stranger.	Kidney			
Dick Cass	(1946–)	President of the Baltimore Ravens football team, donated kidney to law school friend	Kidney			
Jake Garn	(1932–)	U.S. Senator/Space Shuttle specialist, donated a kidney to his daughter	Kidney	September 1986		
Nicholas Green	(1987–1994)	American boy who was killed in Italy. His parents chose to donate his organs.	Various	October 1994	N/A; organs donated upon death	
Jon-Erik Hexum	(1957–1984)	American model and actor.	Heart, kidneys and corneas	October 1984	N/A; organs donated upon death	
Virginia Postrel	(1960–)	Donated kidney to her friend Sally Satel	Kidney	March 2006		
Dr. Rajkumar	(1929–2006)	Popular Indian film personality who donated his eyes after death and inspired thousands others to pledge their eyes.	Eyes	April 2006	N/A; organs donated upon death	
Oscar Robertson	(1938–)	Basketball Hall of Famer. Donated kidney to his daughter Tia.	Kidney	1997		
Neda Soltan	(1983–2009)	Iranian martyr, a bystander at a political protest, her death was recorded by cell phone cameras.	Various	Circa June 20, 2009	N/A; organs donated upon death	
Angélico Vieira	(1982–2011)	Portuguese actor and singer.	Pancreas, liver and kidneys	Circa June 2011	N/A; organs donated upon death	
Everson Walls	(1959–)	Former NFL player, donated kidney to former Dallas Cowboys teammate Ron Springs.	Kidney	February 28, 2007		
Olle Westling	(1945–)	Swedish socionom and municipal civil servant, donated kidney to his son Prince Daniel, Duke of Västergötland.	Kidney	May 27, 2009		
Justin Wilson	(1978–2015)	British racing driver.	Various	Circa August 2015	N/A; organs donated upon death	

== Artificial organ implants ==
Procedure	Doctor in charge of implant/device	Name of recipient	Organ/device implanted	Comments	Date of implant	Survival	Reference
Pacemaker (first implant)	Dr. Rune Elmqvist	Arne Larsson	Implantable cardiac pacemaker	First successful permanent implantable pacemaker	1958, Sweden	Patient survived 43 years with device	https://www.nobelprize.org/prizes/medicine/1998/elmqvist/lecture/
Artificial heart (Jarvik-7)	Dr. Robert Jarvik / Dr. William DeVries	Barney Clark	Jarvik-7 total artificial heart	First permanent total artificial heart implant	1982, USA	Survived 112 days post-op	https://www.nejm.org/doi/full/10.1056/NEJM198210073071901
Insulin pump	Dr. Arnold Kadish (early models)	Various diabetic patients	Implantable insulin pump	Early implantable device for continuous insulin delivery	Late 1970s onwards	Varies	https://care.diabetesjournals.org/content/early/2015/05/15/dc15-0746
Implantable cardioverter defibrillator (ICD)	Dr. Michel Mirowski	Former pilot	ICD device	First successful ICD implant to prevent sudden cardiac death	1980, USA	Patient survived	https://www.ahajournals.org/doi/full/10.1161/01.CIR.88.2.569
Artificial pancreas (closed-loop insulin delivery)	Various research teams	Various Type 1 diabetes patients	Artificial pancreas system (continuous glucose monitor + insulin pump)	First FDA-approved closed-loop system	2016, USA	Ongoing clinical use	https://www.fda.gov/news-events/press-announcements/fda-approves-first-automated-insulin-delivery-device
Left ventricular assist device (LVAD)	Dr. Michael DeBakey (early designs)	Various heart failure patients	LVAD pump	Mechanical circulatory support to bridge heart failure or transplant	First successful use 1966 onwards	Ongoing	https://medlineplus.gov/ency/article/007310.htm

=== Xenotransplants(from Animals) into humans ===
No.	Procedure	Doctor in charge of implant/device	Name of recipient	Organ/device implanted	Supported/replaced organ or tissue	Comments	Year	Country	Survival	Reference
1	Corneal xenograft	Richard Kissam	Unnamed (young man)	Pig cornea	Cornea	One of the earliest recorded xenotransplants; graft failed within a month	1838	United States	<1 month	
2	Kidney xenotransplantation (heterotopic)	Mathieu Jaboulay	Unnamed (48-year-old woman)	Pig kidney	Kidney	Grafted to the elbow; failed quickly	1906	France	Days	
3	Kidney xenotransplantation	Keith Reemtsma	Jefferson Davis (longest survivor of 13 patients)	Chimpanzee kidney	Kidney	Longest of 13 chimpanzee-kidney recipients; died of an electrolyte disturbance	1963–1964	United States	~9 months	
4	Heart xenotransplantation	James D. Hardy	Unnamed (68-year-old man)	Chimpanzee heart	Heart	First cardiac xenotransplant attempted in a human	January 1964	United States	~2 hours	
5	Kidney xenotransplantation	Thomas Starzl	Six unnamed patients	Baboon kidney	Kidney	No long-term survivors; comparable outcomes to the Reemtsma series	1964	United States	Days to weeks	
6	Heart valve xenograft (bioprosthetic)	Alain Carpentier	Multiple patients	Glutaraldehyde-fixed porcine heart valve	Heart valve	Foundational technique still used in most tissue heart valves today	1965–1970 (published 1969)	France	Long-term (basis of current bioprosthetics)	
7	Heart xenotransplantation	Leonard L. Bailey	"Baby Fae"	Baboon heart	Heart	First infant cardiac xenotransplant; died of humoral graft rejection linked to ABO mismatch	October 1984	United States	21 days	
8	Liver xenotransplantation	Thomas Starzl	Unnamed patient	Baboon liver	Liver	Longest-surviving liver xenograft recipient at the time	1992–1993	United States	70 days	
9	Heart, lung, and kidney xenotransplantation	Dhani Ram Baruah	Purno Saikia	Non-genetically-modified pig heart, lungs, and kidney	Heart, lungs, kidneys	Widely regarded as ethically and scientifically unverified; surgeons arrested; patient died of multiple infections	December 1996	India	Days	
10	Islet cell xenotransplantation	Wang W, et al.	Multiple patients (clinical trial)	Neonatal pig pancreatic islet cells	Pancreatic islets	Clinical trial for type 1 diabetes	2011	China	Trial-based, variable	
11	Skin xenograft (biological dressing)	Lima-Junior EM, et al.	Case series	Sterilized tilapia fish skin	Skin (burn wound)	Used as a biological burn-wound dressing	2019	Brazil	Wound healing; not organ survival	
12	Kidney xenotransplantation (decedent)	Robert Montgomery	Unnamed (brain-dead recipient)	Genetically modified pig kidney (alpha-gal knockout)	Kidney	First clinical-grade genetically engineered pig kidney xenotransplant to a brain-dead human	September 2021	United States	54 hours (study duration)	
13	Heart xenotransplantation	Bartley P. Griffith	David Bennett Sr.	Genetically modified (10-gene-edit) pig heart	Heart	First successful pig-to-human heart xenotransplant in a living patient	January 2022	United States	60 days	
14	Heart xenotransplantation	Bartley P. Griffith	Lawrence Faucette	Genetically modified pig heart	Heart	Second living-patient pig-heart transplant; died after signs of rejection	September 2023	United States	40 days	
15	Kidney xenotransplantation	Tatsuo Kawai, MGH team	Richard Slayman	Genetically edited (69-edit) pig kidney	Kidney	First gene-edited pig kidney in a living patient; died of unrelated cause with no sign of rejection	March 2024	United States	~2 months	
16	Kidney xenotransplantation (combined with heart pump)	NYU Langone team	Lisa Pisano	Genetically modified pig kidney	Kidney	Kidney removed ~5 weeks later due to insufficient blood flow related to a mechanical heart pump	April 2024	United States	~5 weeks (graft)	
17	Kidney xenotransplantation	MGH team	Tim Andrews	Gene-edited pig kidney	Kidney	Longest-surviving pig kidney xenograft to date (271 days); removed after rejection; recipient later received a human kidney	January 2025	United States	271 days	
18	Lung xenotransplantation (decedent)	He J, Shi J, et al.	Unnamed (brain-dead recipient)	Genetically modified pig lung	Lung	First reported pig-to-human lung xenotransplant	August 2025	China	Study duration (short-term)	

=== More neatly formatted and sortable version of the same table ===
often multiple artificial organ supports are needed to replace or substitute a single human organ transplant

Artificial organd and Medical Implants Devices, transplanted and functioning in humans
No.	Procedure	Doctor in charge of implant/device	Name of recipient	Organ/device implanted	Supported / Replaced Organ / Tissue	Comments	Year	Country	Survival	Reference
1	Pacemaker (first implant)	Dr. Rune Elmqvist	Arne Larsson	Implantable cardiac pacemaker	Heart (electrical conduction)	First successful permanent implantable pacemaker	1958	Sweden	Patient survived 43 years with device	Nobel Prize Lecture
2	Artificial heart (Jarvik-7)	Dr. Robert Jarvik / Dr. William DeVries	Barney Clark	Jarvik-7 total artificial heart	Whole heart	First permanent total artificial heart implant	1982	USA	Survived 112 days post-op	NEJM
3	Insulin pump	Dr. Arnold Kadish (early models)	Various diabetic patients	Implantable insulin pump	Pancreas (insulin secretion)	Early implantable device for continuous insulin delivery	1979	Various	Varies	Diabetes Journals
4	Implantable cardioverter defibrillator (ICD)	Dr. Michel Mirowski	Former pilot	ICD device	Heart (electrical regulation)	First successful ICD implant to prevent sudden cardiac death	1980	USA	Patient survived	AHA Journals
5	Artificial pancreas (closed-loop insulin delivery)	Various research teams	Various Type 1 diabetes patients	Artificial pancreas system (CGM + insulin pump)	Pancreas (insulin/glucose regulation)	First FDA-approved closed-loop system	2016	USA	Ongoing clinical use	FDA Press Release
6	Left ventricular assist device (LVAD)	Dr. Michael DeBakey (early designs)	Various heart failure patients	LVAD pump	Heart (left ventricle / cardiac output)	Mechanical circulatory support to bridge heart failure or transplant	1966	Various	Ongoing	MedlinePlus
7	Artificial blood transfusion	NHS scientists / Dr. Nick Watkins (Team)	First clinical trial volunteers	Artificial blood (lab-grown red cells)	Blood (oxygen transport)	First use of lab-grown red blood cells in human trial	2022	UK	Ongoing trials	NHS News
8	Dialysis ("artificial kidney")	Dr. Willem J. Kolff	Surviving patient(s) in early series	Rotating‑drum dialysis device / artificial kidney	Kidney (filtration, waste removal)	One of first reliable devices to take over kidney filtration function	1943 (early prototype) / later human use ~1948	Netherlands / USA	One early patient survived ~7 years (see source)	
9	Total hip replacement (modern low-friction)	Sir John Charnley	(early hip patient)	Total hip prosthesis	Hip joint (mobility / support)	Breakthrough low-friction hip replacement design	1962	UK	Many long-term survivors; became standard of care	
10	Exeter hip stem (cemented hip implant)	Prof. Robin Ling (with engineer Clive Lee)	(first Exeter implant)	Exeter hip prosthesis	Hip joint	One of the first taper‑stem cemented hip systems; excellent long-term outcome	1970	UK	~92 % still non‑loosened at 33 years (in cohort)	
11	First total artificial heart (bridge)	Dr. Denton Cooley / Liotta	(early patient)	Liotta TAH	Heart (temporary replacement)	Early TAH as a bridge to transplant	1966	USA	Short‑term support	
12	Syncardia / pneumatic TAH (commercial)	SynCardia (Jarvik‑7 derivative)	Various end-stage heart failure patients	Syncardia total artificial heart	Whole heart	TAH approved for bridge-to-transplant use	2000s / FDA BTT in 2014	USA	Varies (bridge to transplant)	
13	Carmat (bioprosthetic total artificial heart)	Dr. Alain Carpentier / Carmat team	(first human)	Carmat TAH	Whole heart	Fully implantable, self‑regulating artificial heart	2013 first human implant	France	Support ~8 months, then heart transplant	
14	Aeson bioprosthetic total artificial heart	Mark Slaughter, Siddharth Pahwa (team)	Female first patient	Aeson bioprosthetic TAH	Whole heart	Investigational TAH used as bridge to transplant	2021	USA	Ongoing study	
15	Cultured skin graft / skin regeneration	Dr. Howard Green (and James Rheinwald lab)	Jamie & Glen Selby, burn patients	Lab‑grown skin graft (keratinocyte sheets)	Skin (epidermis / dermis regeneration)	Skin / epidermis (dermal / epidermal coverage)First therapeutic use of cultured human skin grafts for burn patients; allowed grafting when donor skin was insufficient (using patient's own cells)	~1980s (first human use, small grafts; large scale in 1983 for severely burned children)	USA (Harvard / MIT / Boston)	The Selby boys survived and lived decades after the grafts; the grafting technique proved clinically viable	

== Organisations which collects useful statistics on Organ donation ==
Continent	Organization Name	Countries Covered	Role / Description	Website
North America	United Network for Organ Sharing (UNOS)	United States	National organ transplant network, allocation, registry	unos.org
Europe	Eurotransplant	Austria, Belgium, Croatia, Germany, Hungary, Luxembourg, Netherlands, Slovenia	Multinational organ allocation and transplant coordination	eurotransplant.org
	Scandiatransplant	Denmark, Finland, Iceland, Norway, Sweden	Nordic organ sharing network	https://www.scandiatransplant.org/
	Organización Nacional de Trasplantes (ONT)	Spain	National organ donation and transplant authority; global leader in donation rates	ont.es
Asia	Japan Organ Transplant Network (JOT)	Japan	National organ transplant network	jot.or.jp
	Korea Network for Organ Sharing (KONOS)	South Korea	National organ transplant organization	konos.go.kr
	Indian Network for Organ Sharing (INOS) / National Organ & Tissue Transplant Organization (NOTTO)	India	National organ sharing and transplant coordination	notto.gov.in
Africa	South African Transplant Society (SATS)	South Africa	National organ transplant coordination	sats.org.za
South America	Brazilian Transplant System (SNT)	Brazil	National transplant coordination system	gov.br/saude

=== Outside official government or national registry systems ===
Network Name	Region / Scope	Role / Description	Notes / Example	Website
Alliance for Paired Donation (APD)	North America (USA, Canada)	Independent, nonprofit organization facilitating kidney paired donation chains outside of UNOS	Matches incompatible donor-recipient pairs across US and Canada	apd.org
Global Kidney Exchange (GKE)	International	A nonprofit facilitating cross-border paired kidney exchanges between countries with different economic statuses	Enables living donor kidney exchange across national borders	globalkidneyexchange.org
European Paired Exchange Programs	Europe	Some European countries collaborate in paired kidney exchange outside Eurotransplant framework	Example: UK National Living Donor Kidney Sharing Scheme (independent from Eurotransplant)	nhs.uk

== See also ==
- Allotransplantation
- List of bones of the human skeleton
- List of systems of the human body
- List of skeletal muscles of the human body
- List of organs of the human body
- Artificial organ
- Beating heart cadaver
- Blood transfusion
- Laboratory-grown organ
- Organ donation
- Regenerative medicine
- Transplant rejection
- Xenotransplantation
- Microchimerism
- Mitochondrial replacement therapy Others
  - Grafting
  - Transplantable organs and tissues
