= Hot stove league =

Term for baseball's off-season

In baseball, hot stove league is the sport's off-season. The phrase does not denote an actual league, but instead calls up images of baseball fans gathering around a hot stove during the cold winter months, discussing their favorite baseball teams and players. During this time, players move to other teams more actively. Fans are also interested in the new season when they see the news of the transfer.

The term has also come to refer to the wave of MLB player transactions (contract negotiations, re-signings, trades, free agency, etc.) that occur between seasons. Since most free-agent signings and trades occur during the off-season, this time of significant player transactions (including rumors and speculation about possible trades), is often referred to as the hot stove league or more simply, the hot stove.

== History ==
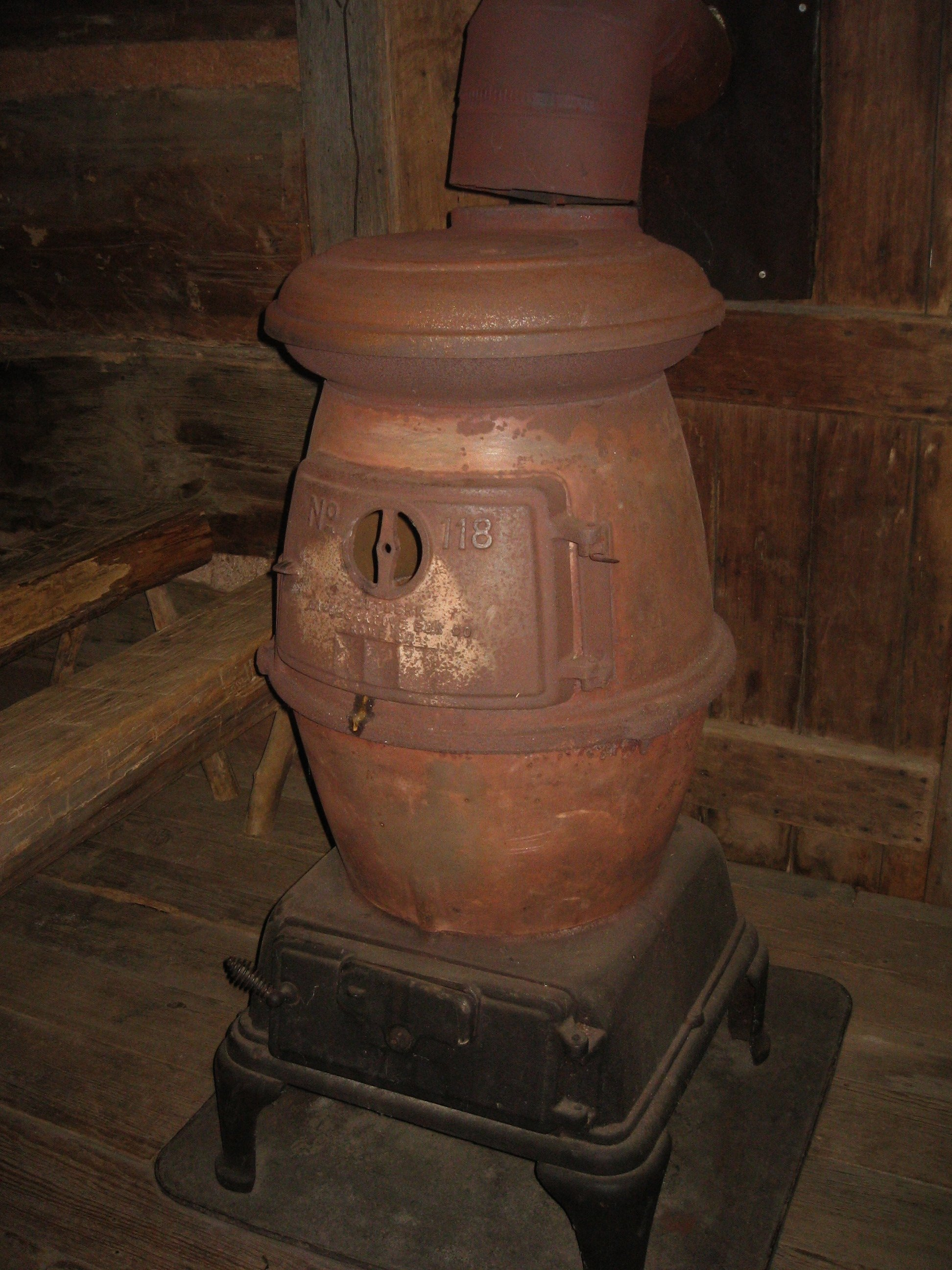
Pot-bellied stove

According to Professor James Hardy, the term hot stove league dates from nineteenth-century small town America when, during the winter, people "gathered at the general store/post office, sat around an iron pot-bellied stove, and discussed the passing parade. Baseball, along with weather, politics, the police blotter and the churches, belonged in that company". Hardy states that the term was popularly employed by sportswriters until World War II, after which rural America gave way to larger, urban centers. Baseball analysis and conversation became the province of radio and television commentators, with off-season chatter becoming less interactive and more impersonal.

According to David Anderson, the news and coverage provided by hot stove league newspaper columnists during the first half of the 20th century, when professional football and basketball had not yet come into being, gave baseball its foothold as "the national pastime and dominant professional sport for more than half of the twentieth century". The hot stove league was especially important in the era of the reserve clause, when the only leverage a player had to receive more money or better contract provisions was to hold out from re-signing, refuse to play, or threaten to retire. During the off-season, when contract negotiations were underway, the rumors and reports were frequent, and fans kept up with the news through hot stove league chatter. The introduction of free agency reduced the importance of the hot stove league.

In the twenty-first century, the term is still used to describe the "endless discussions", speculation and predictions bandied about by "baseball fans, baseball columnists, baseball bloggers, baseball writers, baseball podcasters and baseball radio talk show hosts" to fill the time between the end of the Major League Baseball Winter Meetings and the start of spring training. The MLB Network's daily off-season show of record is called Hot Stove. Often times, teams will post updates of their prospects playing in winter leagues, which run from middle November to February with the championship series in the Caribbean (Caribbean Series) or Australia (Claxton Shield).

== Other uses ==
Hot Stove League was the name of a radio segment featuring hockey chatter and analysis that was broadcast between periods on the radio show Hockey Night in Canada beginning in 1939. The segment became a pre-game series on CBC Television in the 1950s.

Hot Stove League is also a 2019 South Korean television series about an underdog baseball team.

== Notes ==
=== Sources ===
- Anderson, David W. (2003). More Than Merkle: A History of the Best and Most Exciting Baseball Season in Human History. University of Nebraska Press. ISBN 0803259468.
- Brand, Dana (2007). Mets Fan. McFarland. ISBN 978-0786482481.
- Dahlgren, Peter; Sparks, Colin, eds. (1992). Journalism and Popular Culture. SAGE. ISBN 1446230643.
- Hardy, James D. Jr. (2007). Baseball and the Mythic Moment: How We Remember the National Game. McFarland. ISBN 978-0786426508.
- Mahony, Philip (2014). Baseball Explained. McFarland. ISBN 978-0786479641.
- Martinez, David H. (2000). The Book of Baseball Literacy. iUniverse. ISBN 0595129927.
- Nolan, Michael (2001). CTV: The network that means business. University of Alberta. p. 184. ISBN 0888643845.
- Rielly, Edward J. (2005). Baseball: An Encyclopedia of Popular Culture. University of Nebraska Press. p. 261. ISBN 0803290055.
- Young, Scott (1990). The Boys of Saturday Night: Inside Hockey Night in Canada. Macmillan of Canada. ISBN 0771591055.
