= Kravinsky =

Kravinsky (masculine, Russian: Кравинский) or Kravinskaya (feminine, Russian: Кравинская) is a Russian surname. Notable people with the surname include:

- Liza Figueroa Kravinsky (born 1962), American actress, composer, and filmmaker
- Zell Kravinsky, American investor and utilitarian

== See also ==
- Krasiński
