= FAM3B =

Protein-coding gene in the species Homo sapiens

Available structures
| PDB | Ortholog search: PDBe RCSB |
| PDB | List of PDB id codes 2YOP, 2YOQ |

Identifiers
- Aliases: FAM3B, 2-21, C21orf11, C21orf76, ORF9, PANDER, PRED44, family with sequence similarity 3 member B, FAM3 metabolism regulating signaling molecule B
- External IDs: OMIM: 608617; MGI: 1270150; HomoloGene: 10766; GeneCards: FAM3B; OMA:FAM3B - orthologs

Gene location (Human)
| Chr. | Chromosome 21 (human) |
| Band | 21q22.3 | Start | 41,304,212 bp |
| Band | 21q22.3 | End | 41,357,727 bp |

Gene location (Mouse)
| Chr. | Chromosome 16 (mouse) |
| Band | 16 C4|16 57.47 cM | Start | 97,272,165 bp |
| Band | 16 C4|16 57.47 cM | End | 97,316,016 bp |
RNA expression pattern
| Bgee | Human / Mouse (ortholog); Top expressed in: mucosa of ileum; parotid gland; jejunal mucosa; duodenum; body of pancreas; pancreatic epithelial cell; pancreatic ductal cell; oral cavity; olfactory zone of nasal mucosa; corpus epididymis / Top expressed in: gastric mucosa; epithelium of stomach; pyloric antrum; mucous cell of stomach; seminal vesicula; duodenum; jejunum; left colon; intestinal villus; seminiferous tubule; More reference expression data |
| BioGPS | n/a |
Gene ontology
| Molecular function | cytokine activity |
| Cellular component | extracellular region; extracellular exosome; extracellular space |
| Biological process | insulin secretion; apoptotic process; regulation of signaling receptor activity; glucose homeostasis; signal transduction |
Sources:Amigo / QuickGO
Orthologs
| Species | Human | Mouse |
| Entrez | 54097 | 52793 |
| Ensembl | ENSG00000183844 | ENSMUSG00000022938 |
| UniProt | P58499 | Q9D309 |
| RefSeq (mRNA) | NM_058186; NM_206964 | NM_020622 |
| RefSeq (protein) | NP_478066; NP_996847 | NP_065647 |
| Location (UCSC) | Chr 21: 41.3 – 41.36 Mb | Chr 16: 97.27 – 97.32 Mb |
| PubMed search |
- Wikidata
| View/Edit Human | View/Edit Mouse |

Protein FAM3B is a protein that in humans is encoded by the FAM3B gene.

== See also ==
- FAM3C
- FAM3D
