= List of systems of the human body =

List of organ systems in the human body

This is a list of the main systems of the human body, including organ systems. An organ system is a group of organs that work together to perform major functions or meet physiological needs of the body.

== Major organ systems ==
There are 11 to 12 distinct organ systems. The endocrine and exocrine systems are sometimes referred to jointly as the endocrine system.

| Organ system | Description | Component organs |
|---|---|---|
| Respiratory system | breathing; exchange of oxygen and carbon dioxide | nose, mouth, paranasal sinuses, pharynx, larynx, trachea, bronchi, lungs and thoracic diaphragm |
| Digestive and excretory system | digestion; breakdown and absorption of nutrients, excretion of solid wastes | teeth, tongue, salivary glands, esophagus, stomach, liver, gallbladder, pancreas, small intestine, large intestine, rectum and anus |
| Circulatory system | circulate blood in order to transport nutrients, waste, hormones, O_{2}, CO_{2}, and aid in maintaining pH and temperature | blood, heart, arteries, veins and capillaries |
| Urinary system | maintain fluid and electrolyte balance, purify blood and excrete liquid waste (urine) | kidneys, ureters, bladder and urethra |
| Integumentary system | exterior protection of body and thermal regulation | skin, hair, fat and nails |
| Skeletal system | structural support and protection, production of blood cells | bones, cartilage, ligaments and tendons |
| Muscular system | movement of body, production of heat | skeletal muscles, smooth muscles and cardiac muscle |
| Endocrine system | communication within the body using hormones made by endocrine glands | hypothalamus, pituitary, pineal gland, thyroid, parathyroid and adrenal glands, ovaries and testicles |
| Exocrine system | various functions including lubrication and protection | ceruminous glands, lacrimal glands, sebaceous glands and mucus |
| Lymphatic system | return lymph to the bloodstream, aid immune responses, form white blood cells | lymph, lymph nodes, lymph vessels, tonsils, spleen and thymus |
| Nervous system | sensing and processing information, controlling body activities | brain, spinal cord, nerves, sensory organs |
| Reproductive system | sex organs involved in reproduction | ovaries, fallopian tubes, uterus, vagina, vulva, penis, testicles, vasa deferentia, seminal vesicles and prostate |

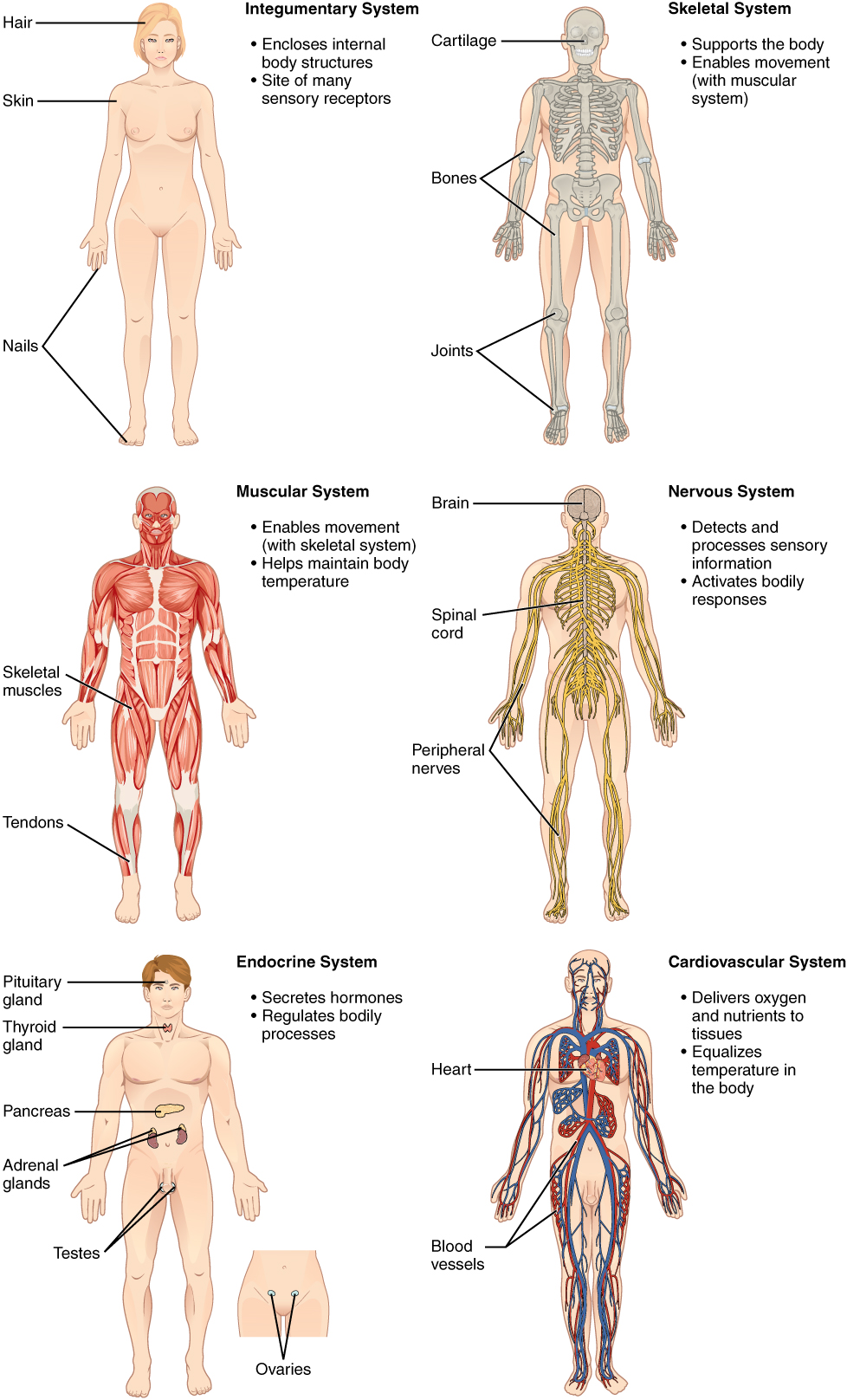
- Clockwise from top left: integumentary system
- skeletal system
- nervous system
- cardiovascular system
- endocrine system
- muscular system

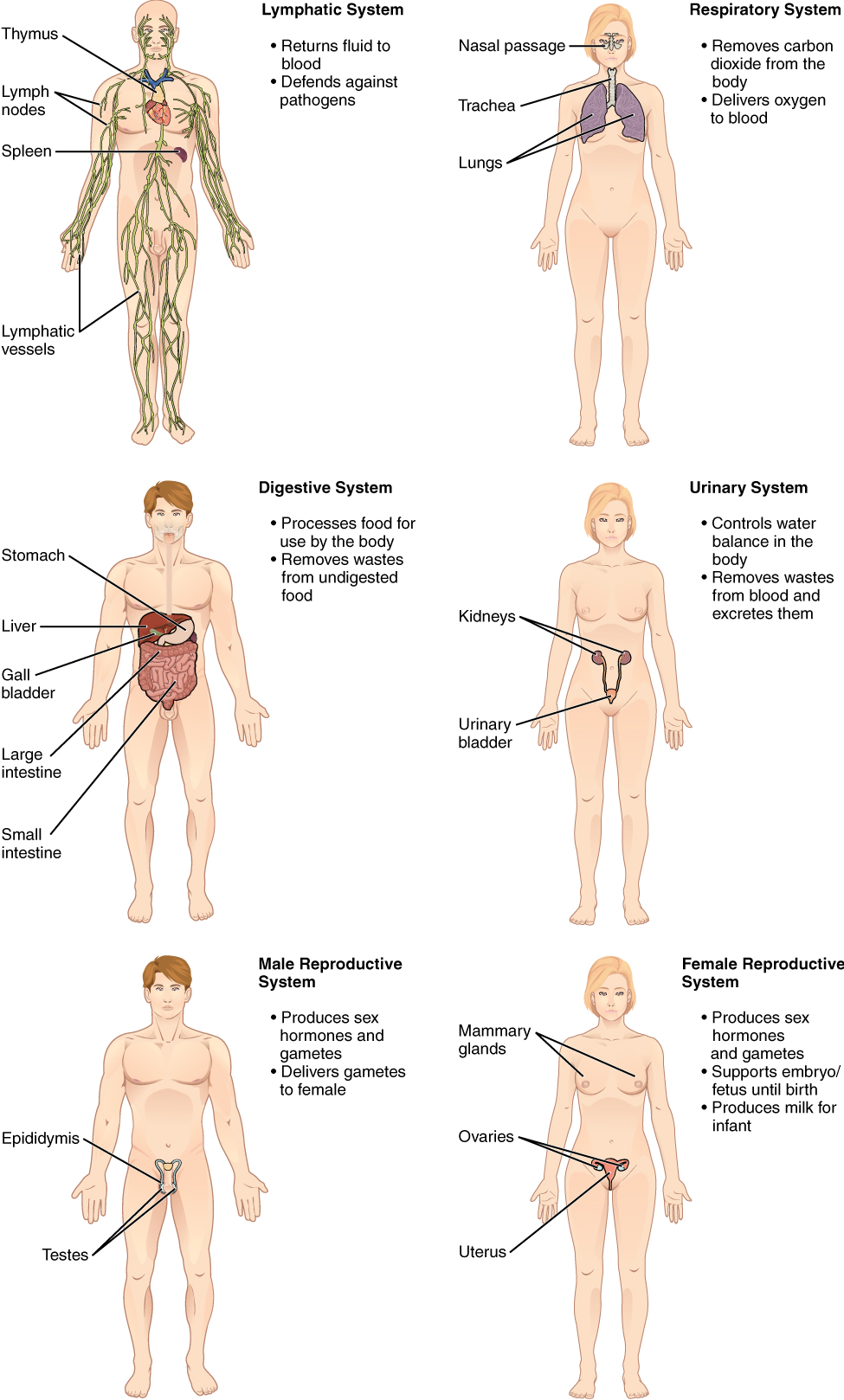
- Clockwise from top left: lymphatic system
- respiratory system
- urinary system
- female reproductive system
- male reproductive system
- digestive system

== Organ sub-systems ==
=== Cardiovascular ===
- Cardiac conduction system

=== Lymphatic ===
- Glymphatic system

=== Nervous ===
- Central nervous system
- Peripheral nervous system
  - Autonomic nervous system
    - Sympathetic nervous system
    - Parasympathetic nervous system
    - Enteric nervous system
  - Somatic nervous system
    - Sensory nervous system
      - Somatosensory system
      - Visual system
      - Olfactory system
      - Gustatory system
      - Auditory system
        - Vestibular system

=== Reproductive ===
- Female reproductive system
- Male reproductive system

== Other systems ==
- Genitourinary system
- Haematopoietic system
- Immune system
  - Innate immune system
  - Adaptive immune system
  - Mononuclear phagocyte system
  - Reticuloendothelial system
- Musculoskeletal system
- Neuroendocrine system

== See also ==
- List of distinct cell types in the adult human body
- List of organs of the human body
