= List of organs of the human body =

This article contains a list of organs in the human body. It is widely believed that there are 78 organs (the number increases if each bone and muscle is also included); however, there is no universal standard definition of what constitutes an organ, and some tissue groups' status as one is debated. Since there is no single standard definition of what constitutes an organ, the number of organs vary depending on how one defines an organ. For example, this list contains more than 78 organs (about ~91).

The list below is not comprehensive, as it is still not clear which definition of an organ is used for all the organs in the list.

== Organ-related tables ==
Explanation of the levels in the human body; defines the column labels in the next table.
Level	Definition
Organ systems	A biological system consisting of a group of organs that work together to perform one or more functions.
Organ sub-systems	A biological system consisting of a group of organs that work together to perform just one function.
Body parts	Somewhat arbitrarily defined sections on the body based on what humans have historically thought was one thing with a primary function.
Organs	A collection of tissues that structurally form a functional unit specialized to perform a particular function (some of the organs in this list perform multiple functions).
Organ parts	The different sections that medical professionals tend to split a given organ into for medical purposes.
Tissue	Consists of a group of structurally and functionally similar cells as well as their intercellular material.
Cells	Organelles enclosed in a membrane.

List of human organs, their parts, and the parts and systems they belong to.
System	Subsystem	Body parts	Organs	Organ parts
Musculoskeletal	Skeletal	Skeleton	Bones	List of bones of the human skeleton
Musculoskeletal	Skeletal	Skeleton	Joints	
Musculoskeletal	Skeletal	Skeleton	Ligaments	
Musculoskeletal	Muscular	Muscles		List of skeletal muscles of the human body
Musculoskeletal	Muscular	Tendons		Tendon#List of Tendons
Digestive		Mouth	Teeth	
Digestive		Mouth	Tongue	
Digestive		Mouth	Lips	
Digestive		Salivary glands	Parotid glands	
Digestive		Salivary glands	Submandibular glands	
Digestive		Salivary glands	Sublingual glands	
Digestive		Pharynx		
Digestive		Esophagus		
Digestive		Stomach		
Digestive		Small intestine	Duodenum	
Digestive		Small intestine	Jejunum	
Digestive		Small intestine	Ileum	
Digestive		Large intestine	Cecum	
Digestive		Large intestine	Ascending colon	
Digestive		Large intestine	Transverse colon	
Digestive		Large intestine	Descending colon	
Digestive		Large intestine	Sigmoid colon	
Digestive		Large intestine	Rectum	
Digestive		Large intestine	Anal canal	
Digestive		Liver		
Digestive		Gallbladder		
Digestive		Mesentery		
Digestive		Pancreas		
Respiratory		Nasal cavity		
Respiratory		Pharynx		
Respiratory		Larynx		
Respiratory		Trachea		
Respiratory		Bronchi		
Respiratory		Bronchioles and smaller air passages		
Respiratory		Lungs		
Respiratory		Muscles of breathing		
Urinary		Kidneys		
Urinary		Ureter		
Urinary		Bladder		
Urinary		Urethra		
Reproductive	Female	Ovaries		
Reproductive	Female	Fallopian tubes		
Reproductive	Female	Uterus		
Reproductive	Female	Cervix		
Reproductive	Female	Placenta		
Reproductive	Female	Vulva (including clitoris)		
Reproductive	Female	Vagina		
Reproductive	Male	Testicles		
Reproductive	Male	Epididymides		
Reproductive	Male	Vasa deferentia		
Reproductive	Male	Seminal vesicles		
Reproductive	Male	Prostate		
Reproductive	Male	Bulbourethral glands		
Reproductive	Male	Penis		
Reproductive	Male	Scrotum		
Endocrine		Pituitary gland		
Endocrine		Pineal gland		
Endocrine		Thyroid gland		
Endocrine		Parathyroid glands		
Endocrine		Adrenal glands		
Endocrine		Pancreas		
Circulatory	Circulatory	Heart		
Circulatory	Circulatory	Arteries		List of arteries of the human body
Circulatory	Circulatory	Veins		List of veins of the human body
Circulatory	Circulatory	Capillaries		
Circulatory	Lymphatic	Lymphatic vessel		
Circulatory	Lymphatic	Lymph node		
Circulatory	Lymphatic	Bone marrow		
Circulatory	Lymphatic	Thymus		
Circulatory	Lymphatic	Spleen		
Circulatory	Lymphatic	Gut-associated lymphoid tissue	Tonsils	
Circulatory	Lymphatic	Interstitium		
Nervous	Central nervous	Brain	Cerebral hemispheres	
Nervous	Central nervous	Brain	Thalamus	
Nervous	Central nervous	Brain	Hypothalamus	
Nervous	Central nervous	Brain	Midbrain	
Nervous	Central nervous	Brain	Cerebellum	
Nervous	Central nervous	Brain	Pons	
Nervous	Central nervous	Brain	Medulla oblongata	
Nervous	Central nervous	The spinal cord		List of nerves of the human body
Nervous	Central nervous	Choroid plexus		
Nervous	Peripheral nervous	Nerves	Cranial nerves	List of nerves of the human body
Nervous	Peripheral nervous	Nerves	Spinal nerves	List of nerves of the human body
Nervous	Peripheral nervous	Nerves	Ganglia	
Nervous	Peripheral nervous	Nerves	Enteric nervous system	
Nervous	Peripheral nervous	Nerves	Sympathetic nervous system	
Nervous	Peripheral nervous	Nerves	Parasympathetic nervous system	
Nervous	Peripheral nervous	Nerves	voluntary nervous system	
Nervous	Sensory organs	Head	Eyes	
Ears	Sensory organs	Head		
Nose	Sensory organs	Head		
Tongue	Sensory organs	Head		
Integumentary		Mammary glands		
Integumentary		Skin	Dermis	
Integumentary		Skin	Epidermis	
Integumentary		Skin	Subcutaneous layer	
Integumentary		Hair		
Integumentary		Nails		

== See also ==
- Terminologia Anatomica
- List of systems of the human body
- List of distinct cell types in the adult human body
- List of skeletal muscles of the human body
- Gene Wiki
- List of organ transplant donors and recipients
- List of bones of the human skeleton
