= FAM3C =

Protein-coding gene in the species Homo sapiens

Identifiers
- Aliases: FAM3C, ILEI, GS3786, family with sequence similarity 3 member C, FAM3 metabolism regulating signaling molecule C
- External IDs: OMIM: 608618; MGI: 107892; GeneCards: FAM3C

Gene location (Human)
Chr.	Chromosome 7 (human)
Band	7q31.31	Start	121,348,878 bp
Band	7q31.31	End	121,396,364 bp

Gene location (Mouse)
Chr.	Chromosome 6 (mouse)
Band	6 A3.1|6 9.24 cM	Start	22,306,519 bp
Band	6 A3.1|6 9.24 cM	End	22,356,242 bp
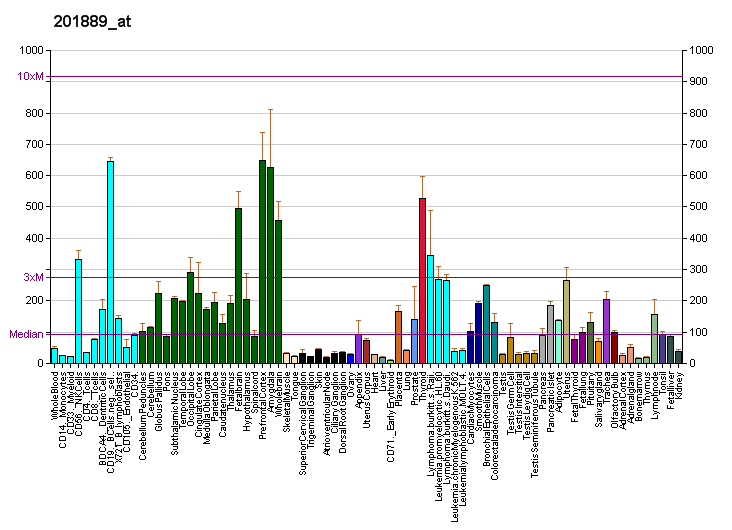
RNA expression pattern
Bgee	Human / Mouse (ortholog); Top expressed in: jejunal mucosa; Achilles tendon; pons; duodenum; lateral nuclear group of thalamus; germinal epithelium; pericardium; vulva; endometrium; mucosa of sigmoid colon / Top expressed in: neural layer of retina; molar; semi-lunar valve; cumulus cell; aortic valve; epithelium of stomach; ascending aorta; Ileal epithelium; urothelium; mucous cell of stomach; More reference expression data
BioGPS	More reference expression data
Gene ontology
Molecular function	cytokine activity; protein binding
Cellular component	extracellular exosome; cytoplasmic vesicle; platelet dense granule lumen; extracellular region; extracellular space; Golgi apparatus
Biological process	multicellular organism development; platelet degranulation; regulation of signaling receptor activity; biological process; negative regulation of gluconeogenesis; signal transduction
Sources:Amigo / QuickGO
Orthologs
Databases	NCBI: entry; OMA: entry
Species	Human	Mouse
Entrez	10447	27999
Ensembl	ENSG00000196937	ENSMUSG00000029672
UniProt	Q92520	Q91VU0
RefSeq (mRNA)	NM_001040020; NM_014888	NM_138587
RefSeq (protein)	NP_001035109; NP_055703	NP_613053
Location (UCSC)	Chr 7: 121.35 – 121.4 Mb	Chr 6: 22.31 – 22.36 Mb
PubMed search
- Wikidata
View/Edit Human	View/Edit Mouse

Protein FAM3C is a protein that in humans is encoded by the FAM3C gene.

== Function ==
This gene is a member of the family with sequence similarity 3 (FAM3) family and encodes a secreted protein with a GG domain. A change in expression of this protein has been noted in pancreatic cancer-derived cells. Alternate transcriptional splice variants which encode the same protein have been characterized. FAM3C functions and expression also were studied in mammalian brains which shown that a reduced FAM3C level associated to the onset of sporadic Alzheimer's disease (AD), which highlighted FAM3C as a promising therapeutic target for Alzheimer's disease. Moreover, level of FAM3C was claimed to be a biomarker for AD together with saposin D.
