= Organ (biology) =

Collection of tissues with similar functions

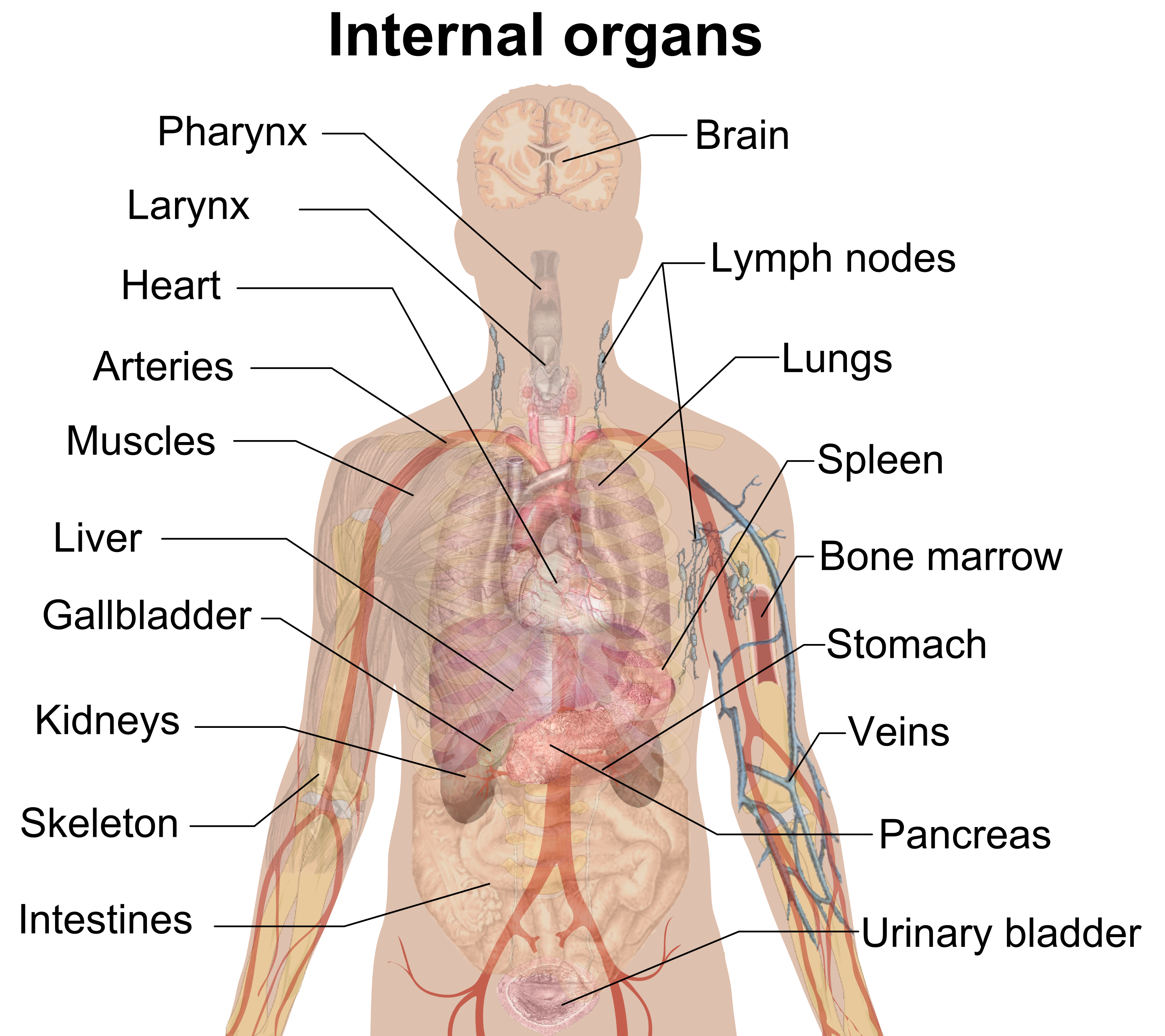
- Many of the internal organs of the human body

Details
- System: Organ systems

Identifiers
- Latin: organum
- Greek: oργανο
- FMA: 67498

In a multicellular organism, an organ is a collection of tissues joined in a structural unit to serve a common function. In the hierarchy of life, an organ lies between tissue and an organ system. Tissues are formed from same type cells to act together in a function. Tissues of different types combine to form an organ which has a specific function. The intestinal wall, for example, is formed by epithelial tissue and smooth muscle tissue. Two or more organs working together in the execution of a specific body function form an organ system, also called a biological system or body system.

An organ's tissues are broadly classified into parenchyma, the functional tissue, and stroma, the structural tissue with supportive, connective, or ancillary functions. For example, the gland tissue that produces hormones is the parenchyma, while the stroma includes the nerves that innervate the parenchyma, the blood vessels that oxygenate and nourish it and remove metabolic wastes, and the connective tissues that provide structure, placement, and anchoring. The primary tissues that form an organ generally have common embryologic origins, often arising from the same germ layer. Organs are present in most multicellular organisms. In single-celled organisms such as eukaryotes, the functional analogue of an organ is an organelle. In plants, there are three main organs. The number of organs in any organism depends on the definition used. There are approximately 79 organs in the human body; the exact number remains debated.

== Animals ==
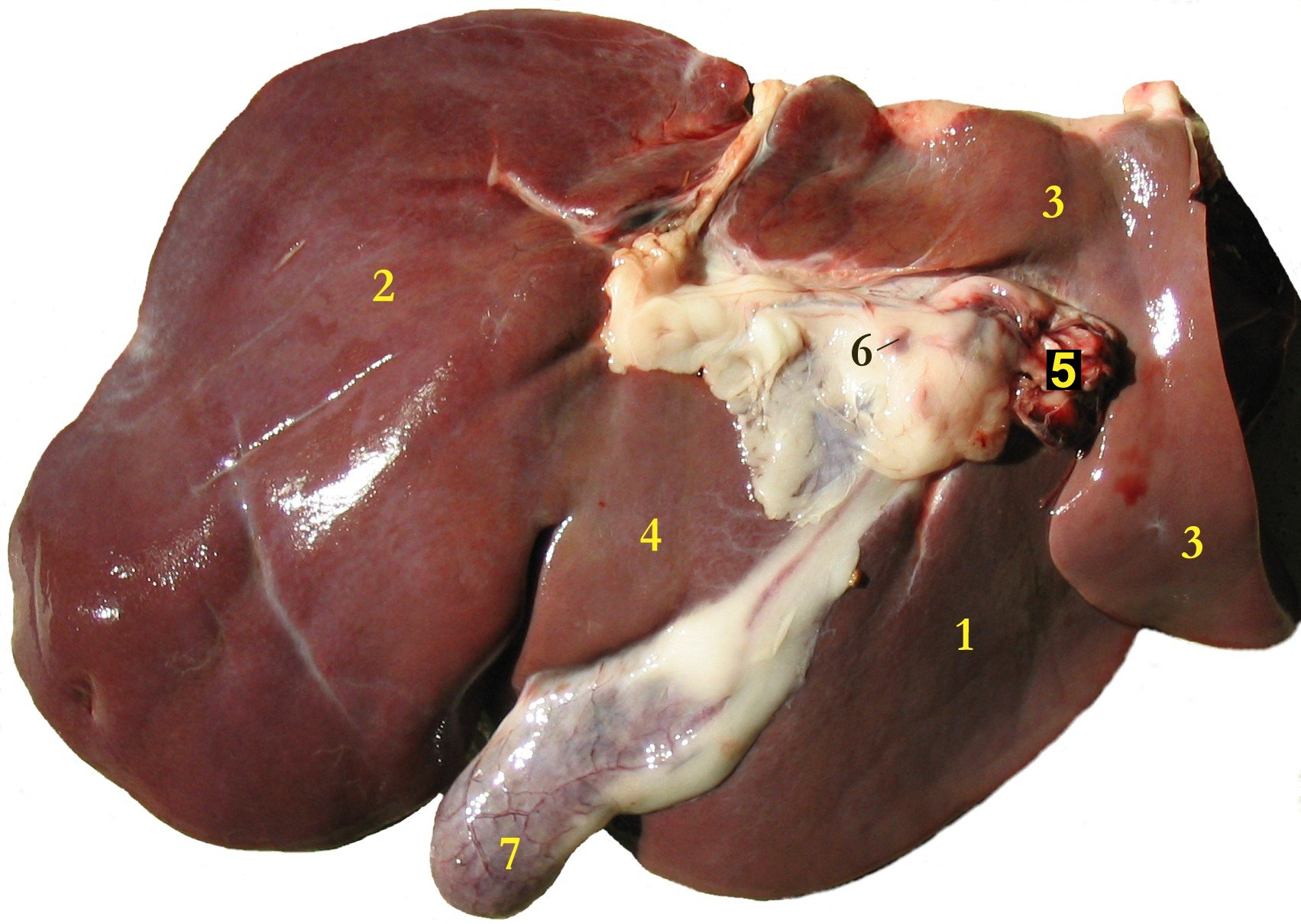
The liver and gallbladder of a sheep

Except for placozoans, multicellular animals including humans have a variety of organ systems. These specific systems are widely studied in human anatomy. The functions of these organ systems often share significant overlap. For instance, the nervous and endocrine system both operate via a shared organ, the hypothalamus. For this reason, the two systems are combined and studied as the neuroendocrine system. The same is true for the musculoskeletal system because of the relationship between the muscular and skeletal systems.

- Cardiovascular system: pumping and channeling blood to and from the body and lungs with heart, blood and blood vessels.
- Digestive system: digestion and processing food with salivary glands, esophagus, stomach, liver, gallbladder, pancreas, intestines, colon, mesentery, rectum and anus.
- Endocrine system: communication within the body using hormones made by endocrine glands such as the hypothalamus, pituitary gland, pineal body or pineal gland, thyroid, parathyroids and adrenals, i.e., adrenal glands.
- Excretory system: kidneys, ureters, bladder and urethra involved in fluid balance, electrolyte balance and excretion of urine.
- Lymphatic system: structures involved in the transfer of lymph between tissues and the blood stream, the lymph and the nodes and vessels that transport it including the immune system: defending against disease-causing agents with leukocytes, tonsils, adenoids, thymus and spleen.
- Integumentary system: skin, hair and nails of mammals. Also scales of fish, reptiles, and birds, and feathers of birds.
- Muscular system: movement with muscles.
- Nervous system: collecting, transferring and processing information with brain, spinal cord and nerves.
- Reproductive system: the sex organs, such as ovaries, oviducts, uterus, vulva, vagina, testicles, vasa deferentia, seminal vesicles, prostate and penis.
- Respiratory system: the organs used for breathing, the pharynx, larynx, trachea, bronchi, lungs and diaphragm.
- Skeletal system: structural support and protection with bones, cartilage, ligaments and tendons.

=== Viscera ===
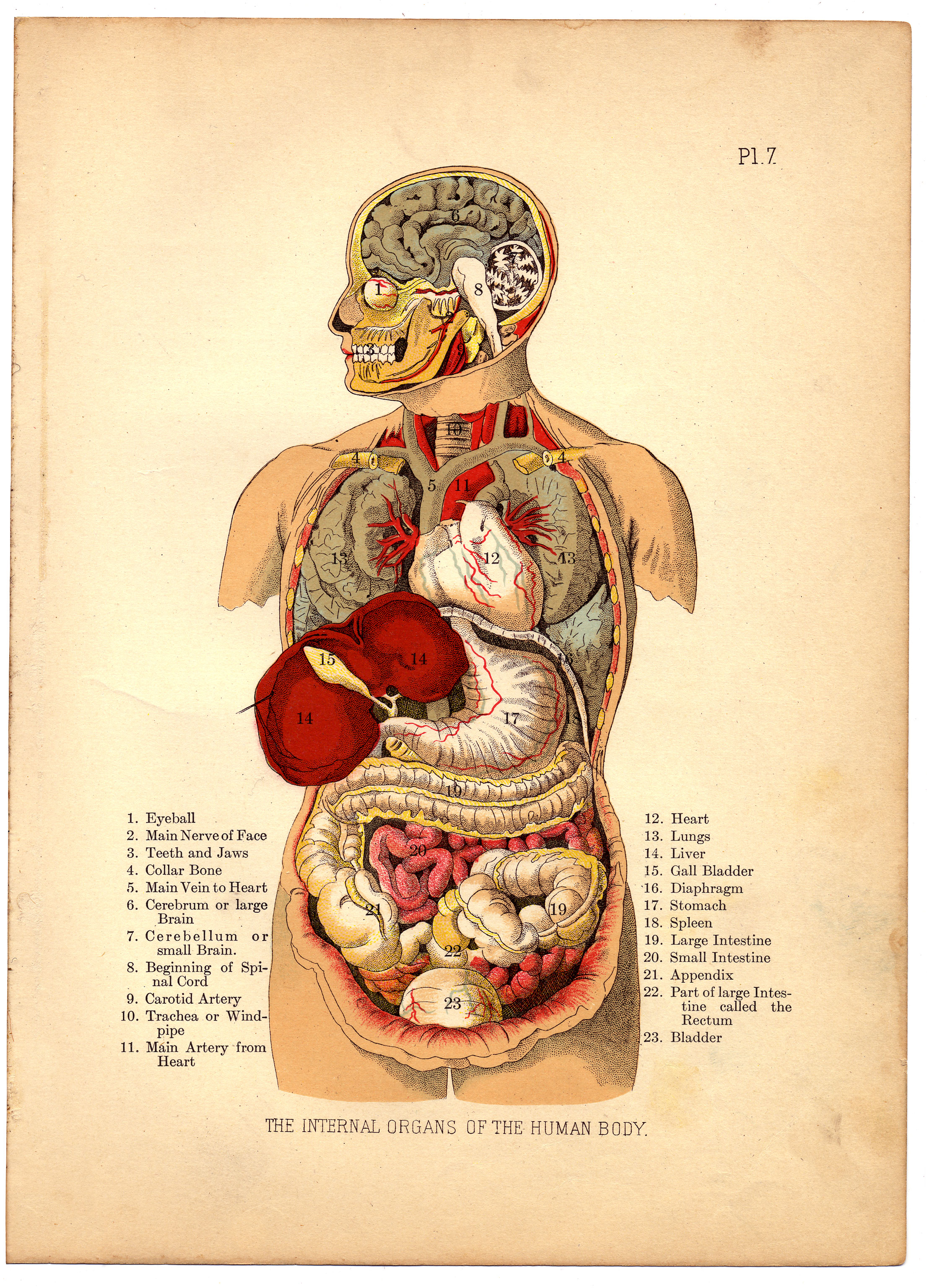
1905 diagram of the internal organs of human body

In the study of anatomy, viscera (sing.: viscus) refers to the internal organs of the abdominal, thoracic, and pelvic cavities. The abdominal organs may be classified as solid organs or hollow organs. The solid organs are the liver, pancreas, spleen, kidneys, and adrenal glands. The hollow organs of the abdomen are the stomach, intestines, gallbladder, bladder, and rectum. In the thoracic cavity, the heart is a hollow, muscular organ. Splanchnology is the study of the viscera. The term "visceral" is contrasted with the term "parietal", meaning "of or relating to the wall of a body part, organ or cavity". The two terms are often used in describing a membrane or piece of connective tissue, referring to the opposing sides.

=== Origin and evolution ===
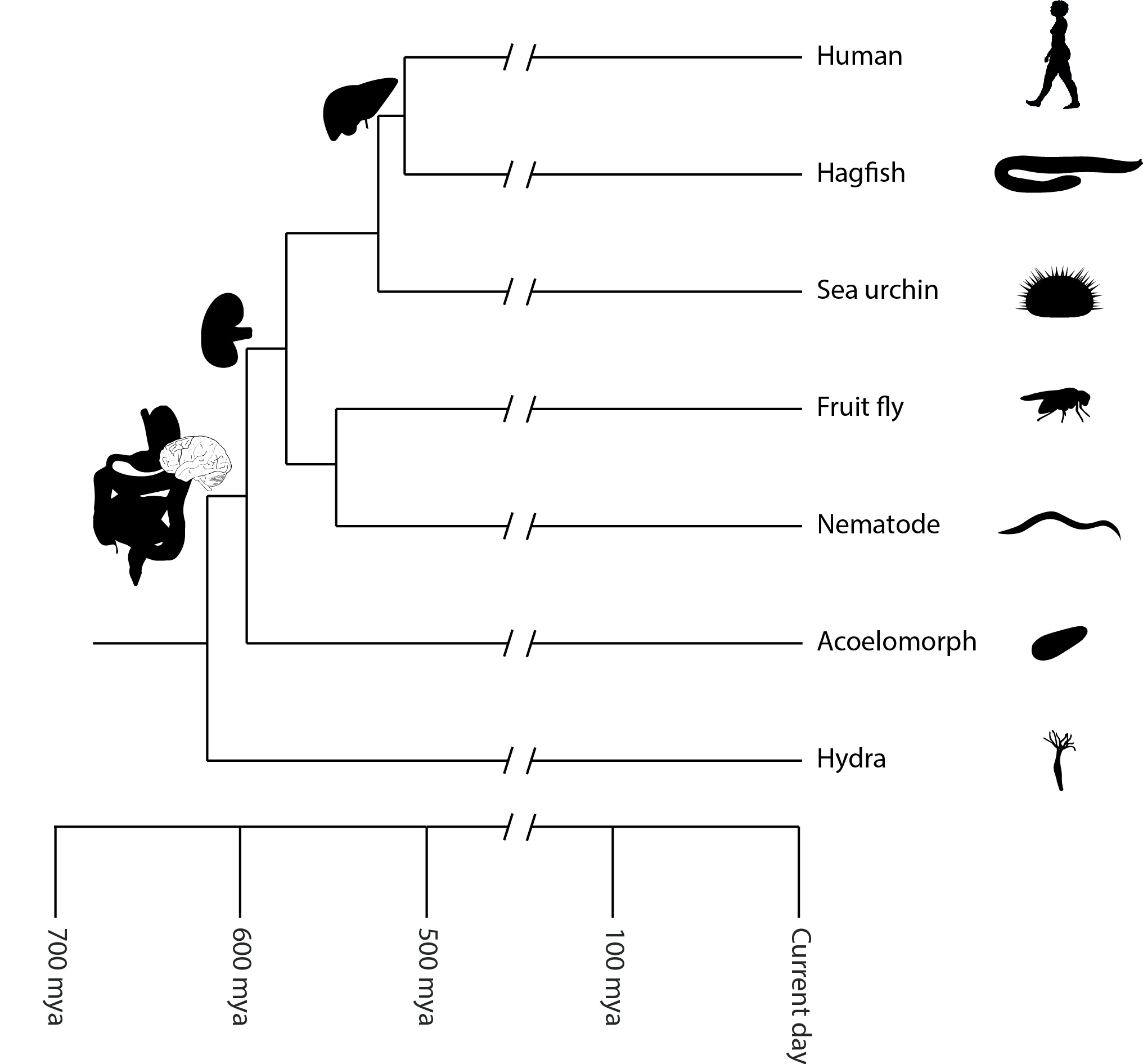
Relationship of major animal lineages with indication of how long ago these animals shared a common ancestor. On the left, important organs are shown, which allows us to determine how long ago these may have evolved.

The organ level of organisation in animals can be first detected in flatworms and the more derived phyla, i.e. the bilaterians. The less-advanced taxa (i.e. Placozoa, Porifera, Ctenophora and Cnidaria) do not show unification of their tissues into organs.

More complex animals are composed of different organs, which have evolved over time. For example, the liver and heart evolved in the chordates about 550–500 million years ago, while the gut and brain are even more ancient, arising in the ancestor of vertebrates, insects, molluscs, and worms about 700–650 million years ago.

Given the ancient origin of most vertebrate organs, researchers have looked for model systems, where organs have evolved more recently, and ideally have evolved multiple times independently. An outstanding model for this kind of research is the placenta, which has evolved more than 100 times independently in vertebrates, has evolved relatively recently in some lineages, and exists in intermediate forms in extant taxa. Studies on the evolution of the placenta have identified a variety of genetic and physiological processes that contribute to the origin and evolution of organs, these include the re-purposing of existing animal tissues, the acquisition of new functional properties by these tissues, and novel interactions of distinct tissue types.

== Plants ==
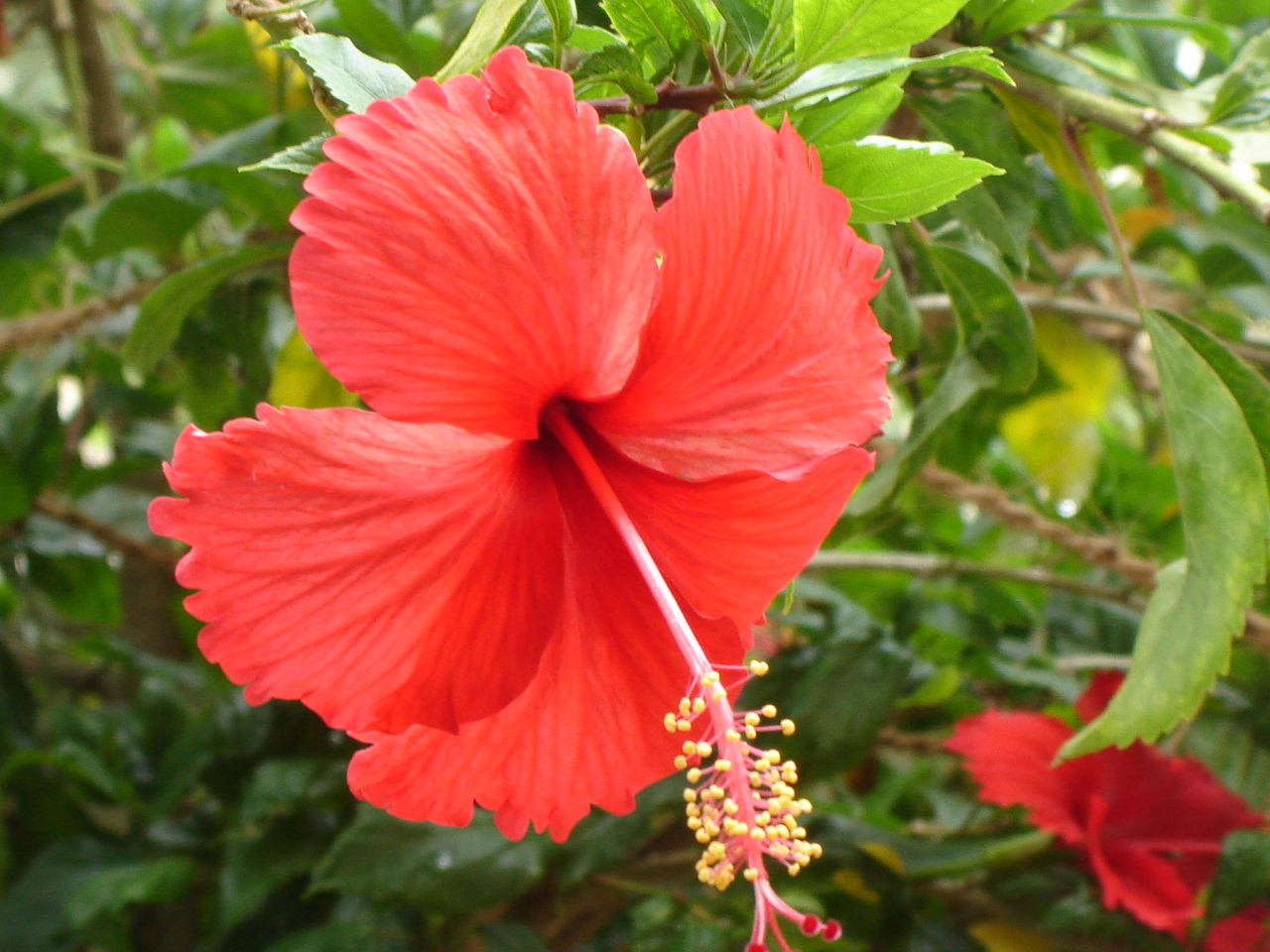
The flower is the angiosperm's reproductive organ. This Hibiscus flower is bisexed, and it contains stamen and pistils.

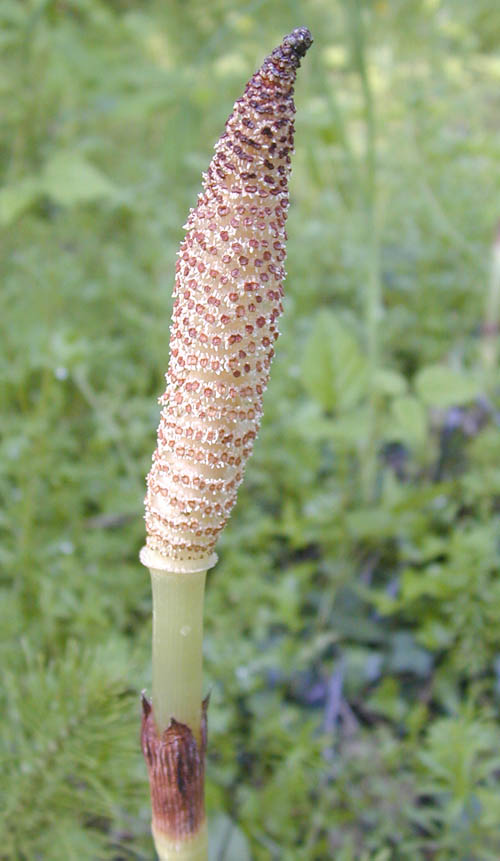
Strobilus of Equisetum telmateia

The study of plant organs is covered in plant morphology. Organs of plants can be divided into vegetative and reproductive structures. Vegetative plant organs include roots, stems, and leaves. Reproductive organs are variable, and in flowering plants, they are represented by the flower, seed and fruit. In conifers, the organ that bears the reproductive structures is called a cone. In other divisions (phyla) of plants, the reproductive organs are called strobili, in Lycopodiophyta, or simply gametophores in mosses. Common organ system designations in plants include the differentiation of shoot and root. All parts of the plant above ground (in non-epiphytes), including the functionally distinct leaf and flower organs, may be classified together as the shoot organ system.

The vegetative organs are essential for maintaining the life of a plant. While there can be 11 organ systems in animals, there are far fewer in plants, where some perform the vital functions, such as photosynthesis, while the reproductive organs are essential in reproduction. However, if there is asexual vegetative reproduction, the vegetative organs are those that create the new generation of plants (see clonal colony).

== Society and culture ==
Many societies have a system for organ donation, in which a living or deceased donor's organ are transplanted into a person with a failing organ. The transplantation of larger solid organs often requires immunosuppression to prevent organ rejection or graft-versus-host disease.

There is considerable interest throughout the world in creating laboratory-grown or artificial organs.

=== Organ transplants ===
Beginning in the 20th century, organ transplants began to take place as scientists knew more about the anatomy of organs. These came later in time as procedures were often dangerous and difficult. Both the source and method of obtaining the organ to transplant are major ethical issues to consider, and because organs as resources for transplant are always more limited than demand for them, various notions of justice, including distributive justice, are developed in the ethical analysis. This situation continues as long as transplantation relies upon organ donors rather than technological innovation, testing, and industrial manufacturing.

Animal donor organs and tissue have been subjects of study since the 1960s, and some xenotransplant tissues, particularly heart valves, have been commonly utilized. Xenotransplant has the potential to address the critical shortage in organ grafts. The science behind xenotransplant trials has advanced considerably and more human clinical trials utilizing porcine xenografts are quickly approaching.

== History ==
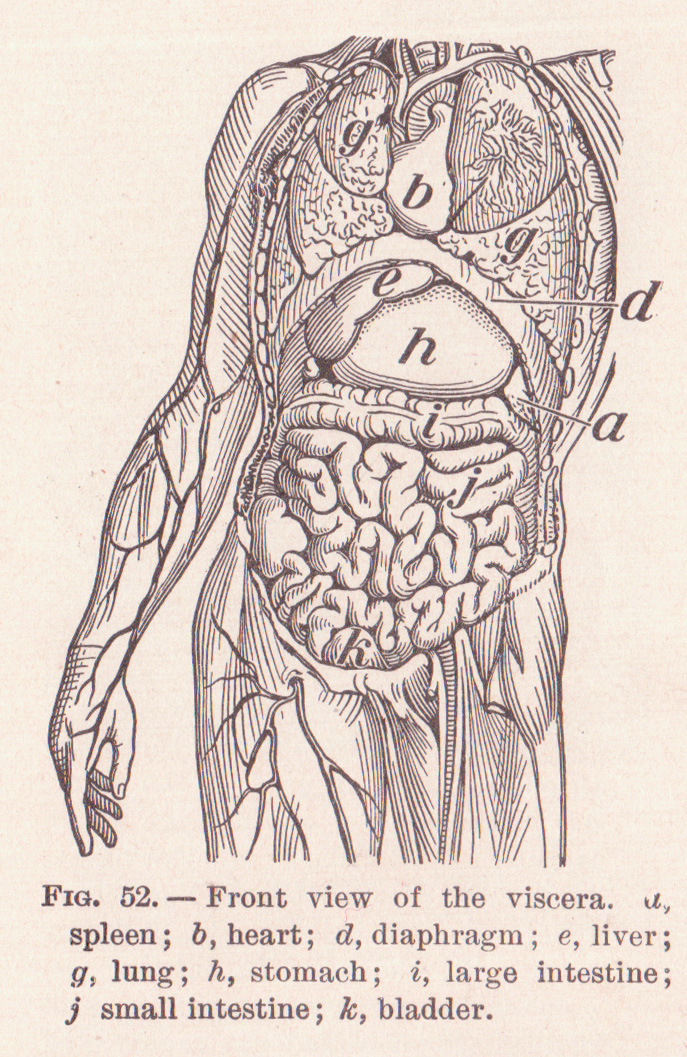
Human viscera

The English word "organ" dates back to the twelfth century, referring to any musical instrument. By the late 14th century, the musical term's meaning had narrowed to refer specifically to the keyboard-based instrument. At the same time, a second meaning arose, in reference to a "body part adapted to a certain function".

Plant organs are made from tissue composed of different types of tissue. The three tissue types are ground, vascular, and dermal. When three or more organs are present, it is called an organ system.

The adjective visceral, also splanchnic, is used for anything pertaining to the internal organs. Historically, viscera of animals were examined by Roman pagan priests like the haruspices or the augurs in order to divine the future by their shape, dimensions or other factors. This practice remains an important ritual in some remote, tribal societies.

The term "visceral" is contrasted with the term "parietal", meaning "of or relating to the wall of a body part, organ or cavity" The two terms are often used in describing a membrane or piece of connective tissue, referring to the opposing sides.

=== Antiquity ===
Aristotle used the word frequently in his philosophy, both to describe the organs of plants or animals (e.g. the roots of a tree, the heart or liver of an animal) because, in ancient Greek, the word 'organon' means 'tool', and Aristotle believed that the organs of the body were tools for us by means of which we can do things. For similar reasons, his logical works, taken as a whole, are referred to as the Organon because logic is a tool for philosophical thinking. Earlier thinkers, such as those who wrote texts in the Hippocratic corpus, generally did not believe that there were organs of the body but only different parts of the body.

Some alchemists (e.g. Paracelsus) adopted the Hermetic Qabalah assignment between the seven vital organs and the seven classical planets as follows:

Planet	Organ
Sun	Heart
Moon	Brain
Mercury	Lungs
Venus	Kidneys
Mars	Gall bladder
Jupiter	Liver
Saturn	Spleen

Chinese traditional medicine recognizes eleven organs, associated with the five Chinese traditional elements and with yin and yang, as follows:

Element	Yin/yang	Organ
Wood	yin	liver
Wood	yang	gall bladder
Fire	yin	heart
Fire	yang	small intestine / san jiao
Earth	yin	spleen
Earth	yang	stomach
Metal	yin	lungs
Metal	yang	large intestine
Water	yin	kidneys
Water	yang	bladder

The Chinese associated the five elements with the five planets (Jupiter, Mars, Venus, Saturn, and Mercury) similar to the way the classical planets were associated with different metals. The yin and yang distinction approximates the modern notion of solid and hollow organs.

== See also ==
- List of organs of the human body
- Organoid
- Organ-on-a-chip
- Situs inversus
- Offal
