= Dan Gavriliu =

Dan Gavriliu (April 26, 1915 in Brăila — November 4, 2012) was a Romanian surgeon who performed the first total surgical replacement of the human esophagus, using sections of stomach to bypass damaged or deformed tissue.

Gavriliu first performed the operation on April 20, 1951; it was the first successful replacement of a human organ. After describing his procedure in the scientific literature, however, Gavriliu did not write extensively about his research, as he could not afford to pay the publication fees.

== Honors ==
Gavriliu was made a Knight-Cavalier of the Italian Republic and an emeritus member of the International Society of Surgery in 1983. In 1985 he was inducted into the Académie Nationale de Médecine.
