= Kelly Perkins =

American heart transplant recipient

- Website: https://www.craigandkelly.com/

Kelly Perkins is an American heart transplant recipient known for climbing mountains to inspire others and promote organ donation. She has set world records as the first ever heart transplant recipient to scale the most famous mountains in the world.

Perkins has selected peaks of many famous mountains, with both personal and cause related significance, since her heart transplant operation in 1995. A good example is her climb of El Capitan in Yosemite Park, with its natural heart shaped cut-out, where she was recently quoted as saying, "We thought, how great would that be to climb straight through the heart of El Capitan... in a symbolic way we are tugging on the heart strings of people to be educated about organ donation".

== Mountains climbed ==
Some of the mountains Perkins has climbed since her heart transplant operation are:

- Half Dome, California, USA, 1996
- Mt. Whitney, California, USA, 1997
- Mount Fuji, Japan, 1998
- Mount Kilimanjaro, Tanzania, 2001
- Matterhorn, Zermatt, Switzerland, 2003
- Aspiring, National Park, New Zealand, 2005
- El Capitan, California, USA, 2005
- Cajon de Arenales, Argentina, 2007
- Half Dome, California, USA, 2008
- Teton Range, Wyoming 2009

== Commercialization ==
Perkins and her husband Craig founded HydraCoach, Inc. in 1999 that helps athletes, medical professionals and health/diet conscious individuals adhere to their personal hydration needs, a problem Perkins experienced during one of her climbs.

Perkins memoir, "The Climb of My Life," details her life before her heart transplant operation, and her work and mountain climbs since. Publishers Weekly wrote "Perkins's engaging tale provides valuable inspiration for others struggling to return to an active life after a dire illness." The former president of the American Heart Association, Dr. Donald Harrison, said Perkins' biography is "a gripping story" that "many will enjoy . . . particularly patients, relatives, and friends who are experiencing the ravages of heart disease--giving them hope.
