= James D. Hardy Jr. =

American historian

James Daniel Hardy Jr. (born May 30, 1934) is the former associate dean of the Louisiana State University Honors College and a professor of history at LSU since 1965. He earned his B.A. from Cornell University and his Ph.D. in history from the University of Pennsylvania.

Hardy's specialty is early modern European history, but he has published works in varying fields from geopolitics to the history of baseball.

Hardy teaches Western civilization, constitutional law, and geopolitics at LSU. Hardy's father, James D. Hardy Sr., Ph.D. (Johns Hopkins; physics), was a distinguished professor and researcher at Yale.

Dr. Hardy developed three laws for modern life from Greek philosophy. First, to live is to suffer. Second, for every important question in life there is no answer. Third, if there were an answer it would be love.

== Academic career ==
- Assistant instructor, University of Pennsylvania, 1958-1960
- Assistant professor of history, Union College, 1961–62 (replacement for a man on leave)
- Assistant professor of history, Bucknell University, 1962–65
- Assistant professor of history, Louisiana State University, 1965–68
- Associate professor of history, Louisiana State University, 1968–76
- Professor of history, Louisiana State University, 1976–present
- Associate director of honors, 1983-1993
- Associate dean, Honors College, 1993-2003
- Erich & Lea Sternberg Distinguished Honors Professor, 1997–98

=== Teaching awards ===
- "Doc" Amborski Award for Teaching Excellence in Honors, 1982
- LSU Parents Association Distinguished Professor, 1985
- Tiger Athletic Foundation Distinguished Teaching Award, 1995
- "Doc" Amborski Award for Teaching Excellence in Honors, 1998

=== State and professional educational committees ===
- Louisiana State Department of Education Committee on Social Science Fairs, 1970–76
- Louisiana State Department of Education Committee on the Revision of World History in the Schools, 1967–70
- "Principal Scholar" on Louisiana Council for the Humanities Grant, summer, 198
- Coordinator for National Collegiate Honors Symposium, New Orleans, 198

=== Professional associations (by invitation) ===
- Senior Fellow, New Mexico Independence Research Institute, 2003
- Mackinder Forum: 2003–present

=== International presentations (invited) ===
- James D. Hardy, Jr. and Leonard J. Hochberg, “Dilemmas of Justice and Geopolitics in the Athenian Maritime Empire: An Analysis of Thucydides’ The Peloponnesian War,” presented to the Mackinder Forum, New College, Oxford University, April 2004.

=== Extra-mural teaching ===
- Louisiana Lagniappe Studies Unlimited, Instructor, 1997 - 2012

=== Extra-mural professional service ===
- Track co-chair (with Professor Leonard Hochberg) on geopolitics and economics, 2004 Convention of International Academy of Business Disciplines (IABD)
- Referee for 2004 Convention presentations on geopolitics and economic for American Society for Competitiveness (ASC)
- Member, On-Site Board of the United States Civil War Center

=== Extra-mural publications and service ===
- James D. Hardy, Jr., “Unfinished Work,” review of Paul A. Cimbala and Randall M. Miller, eds., The Freedmen's Bureau and Reconstructions: Reconsiderations (New York: Fordham University Press, 1999), Fall, 1999.
- James D. Hardy Dr., “Cavalier Justice,” review of Mark E. Neely, Jr., Southern Rights: Political Prisoners and the Myth of Confederate Constitutionalism (Charlottesville, VA: University of Virginia Press, 2000), June/July, 2000
- James D. Hardy Jr., “Duty First,” review of Russell Duncan, ed., Blue-Eyed Child of Fortune: The Civil War Letters of Colonel Robert Gould Shaw (Athens, GA: University of Georgia Press, 2000) and Russell Duncan, Where Death and Glory Meet: Colonel Robert Gould Shaw and the 54th Massachusetts Infantry (Athens, GA: University of Georgia Press, 2000), Winter, 2000.
- James D. Hardy Jr., “Big Dreams, Big Deals,” reviews of Charles Royster, The Fabulous History of the Dismal Swamp Company (New York: Knopf, 2000) and Stephen E. Ambrose, Nothing Like It In The World: The Men Who Built The Transcontinental Railroad, 1863–1869 (New York: Simon and Schuster, 2000), Spring, 2001
- James D. Hardy Jr., “Let us have peace,” review of Jean Edward Smith, Grant (New York: Simon and Schuster, 2001), Summer, 2001.
- James D. hardy Jr., “Garrison Reconsidered,” review of Don E. Fehrenbacher, The Slaveholding Republic: An Account of the United States Government's Relations to Slavery, (New York: Oxford University Press, 2001), Fall, 2001.
- James D. Hardy Jr., “A Meditation on American Politics,” review of George Anastaplo, Abraham Lincoln: A Constitutional Biography (New York: Rowman and Littlefield, 1999), Winter, 2001.
- James D. Hardy Jr., “Homeless, Friendless, Penniless,” review of Ronald Baker, ed., Homeless, Friendless, Penniless: The WPA Interviews with Former Slaves Living in Indiana (Indianapolis, IN: Indiana University Press, 2000), Winter, 2001 issue on the internet only.
- James D. hardy Jr., “The Question of Slavery,” reviews of Harriet C. Frazier, Slavery and Crime in Missouri, 1773–1865 (Jefferson, NC: McFarland, 2001) and Kathryn Grover, The Fugitive's Gibraltar: Escaping Slaves and Abolitionism in New Bedford, Massachusetts (Amherst, MA: University of Massachusetts Press) and Michael Vorenberg, Final Freedom: The Civil War, the Abolition of Slavery, and the Thirteenth Amendment (New York: Cambridge University Press, 2001), Spring, 2002.
- James D. Hardy Jr., “Spin Doctor,” review of Harry J. Maihafer, War of Words: Abraham Lincoln and the Civil War Press (Washington: Brassey, 2001), Summer, 2002.
- James D. Hardy Jr., “Domestic Disturbance,” review of Daniel W. Stowell, In Tender Consideration of Women, Families and the Law in Abraham Lincoln's Illinois (Champaign, IL: University of Illinois Press, 2002), Fall, 2002.
- James D. Hardy Jr., “Bullets and Ballots,” review of Mark E. Neely, Fr., The Union Divided: Party Conflict in the Civil War North (Cambridge, MA: Harvard University Press, 2002), Winter, 2002.
- James D. Hardy Jr., “Faces of Abe,” review of Frank J. Williams, Judging Lincoln (Carbondale, IL: Southern Illinois University Press, 2002), Spring, 2003.
- James D. Hardy Jr., “From Contract to Devotion,” review of Melinda Lawson, Patriot Fires: Forging a New American Nationalism in the Civil War North (Lawrence, KS: University of Kansas Press, 2003), Summer, 2003.
- James D. Hardy Jr., review of George B. Kirsch, Baseball in Blue and Gray (Princeton University Press, 2003) Fall, 2003.
- James D. Hardy Jr., reviews of Michael A. Ross, Justice of Shattered Dreams: Samuel Freeman Miller and the Supreme Court during the Civil War (Louisiana State University, 2003)and Robert Bruce Murray, Legal Cases of the Civil War (Stackpole Books, 2003), Winter, 2004.
- James D. Hardy Jr., review of Edward Steers, Jr., The Trial: The Assassination of President Lincoln and the Trial of the Conspirators (University Press of Kentucky, 2003), Spring 2004.

== Scholastic honors ==
=== Scholarships ===
- New York State Scholarship, 1951–55
- Graduate assistant, University of Pennsylvania, 1956
- Assistant instructor, University of Pennsylvania, 1958–59
- Head assistant instructor, University of Pennsylvania, 1959–60
- Doctoral degree with "Honors", 1961

=== Fellowships and grants ===
- Fels Fellowship, 1960–61
- Co-director, Longwood Foundation Special Historical Research Grant, 1962-1963
- Louisiana State University Graduate Council Research Grant, 1967
- Louisiana State University Graduate Council Research Grant, 1968

== Bibliography ==
=== Books ===
- James D. Hardy, Jr., John H. Jensen, Martin Wolfe, eds., The Maclure Collection of French Revolutionary Materials, (Philadelphia: University of Pennsylvania Press, 1966), xxix, 456 pp.
- James D. Hardy, Jr., Judicial Politics in the Old Regime: The Parlement of Paris During the Regency, (Baton Rouge, La: Louisiana State University Press, 1967), vii, 225 pp.
- Boyd H. Hill, Jr., Arthur J. Slavin, James D. Hardy, Jr., The Western World: The Development of Modern Civilization, (New York: Random House, 1974), vii, 418 pp.
- James D. Hardy, Jr., Prologue to Modernity: Early Modern Europe, (New York: John Wiley and Sons, 1974), viii, 288 pp. Prologue to Modernity has been edited and included in C. Warren Hollister, John F. H. New, James D. Hardy, Jr., Roger Williams, River Through Time: The Course of Western Civilization, (New York: John Wiley and Sons, 1975), 564 pp.
- Gale H. Carrithers, Jr., and James D. Hardy, Jr., Milton and the Hermeneutic Journey, (Baton Rouge: LA Louisiana State University Press, 1994), 355 pp.
- James D. Hardy, Jr., The New York Giants Base Ball Club: The Growth of a Team and a Sport, 1870–1900, (Jefferson, NC: McFarland, 1996), viii, 241 pp., reissued as a paperback, 2006.
- Gale H. Carrithers, Jr. and James D. Hardy, Jr., Age of Iron: English Renaissance Tropologies of Love and Power, (Baton Rouge, LA: Louisiana State University Press, 1998), xv, 314 pp.
- Leonard J. Stanton and James D. Hardy, Jr., Interpreting Nikolai Gogol Within Russian Orthodoxy A Neglected Influence on the First Great Russian Novelist, (Lewiston, New York, The Edwin Mellen Press, 2006), v, 313 pp.
- James D. Hardy, Jr., Baseball and the Mythic Moment How We Remember the Game, (Jefferson, North Carolina, McFarland & Company, Inc., 2007), vii, 211pp.
- James D. Hardy, Jr. and Ann H. Martin, “Light of My Life” Love, Time and Memory In Nabokov's Lolita, (Jefferson, North Carolina, McFarland & Company, 2011), viii, 200 pp.
- James D. Hardy, Jr. and Ann H. Martin, Campus Crisis How Money, Technology, and Policy are Changing the American University, (Jefferson, North Carolina, McFarland & Company, 2011), vii, 207 pp.

=== Articles in books ===
- James D. Hardy, Jr., "The Superior Council in Colonial Louisiana", in J. F. McDermott, ed., Frenchmen and French Ways in the Mississippi Valley, (Urbana, University of Illinois Press, 1969), pp. 87–102.
- James D. Hardy, Jr., “The Holy City”, in Bainard Cowan and Scott Lee, eds. Uniting the Liberal Arts: Core and Context, (Lanham, MD: American University Press, 2002).
- Gale H. Carrithers, Jr. and James D. Hardy, Jr., “‘Not upon a Lecture, but upon a Sermon’ Devotional Dynamics of the Donnean Fisher of Men”, in Mary A. Papazian, ed., John Donne and the Protestant Reformation, (Detroit, Wayne State University Press, 2003)
- Leonard J. Stanton and James D. Hardy, Jr., “The Beautiful Man: Theosis as Epic Destination,” in Vie del monachesimo russo, published by the Comunita de Bose, (Edizioni Qiqajon, Magnano, Italy, 2004). This article will appear in Italian as “L’Uomo Bello. Divmizzazione Come Destinazione Epica.”
- Gale H. Carrithers, Jr. and James d. Hardy, Jr., “Rex Absconditus: Justice, Presence And Intimacy in Measure Fur Measure,” in Jeanne Shami, ed., Renaissance Tropologies The Cultural Imagination of Early Modern England, (Pittsburgh, Pennsylvania, 2008; Duquesne University Press), pp. 23–41.

=== Articles in journals ===
- James D. Hardy, Jr., John H. Jensen, "Maclure Collection Serials: A Descriptive Catalogue", The Library Chronicle, vol. XXIX, Winter, 1963, #1, pp. 31–42.
- James D. Hardy Jr., "French Jesuit Missionaries and the Enlightenment", Bucknell Review, March 1964, pp. 94–108.
- James D. hardy Jr., "The Transportation of Convicts to Colonial Louisiana", Louisiana History, vol. VII, summer, 1966, pp. 207–220.
- James D. Hardy Jr., "Church and State in French Colonial Louisiana: An Essay Review", Louisiana History, Vol. VIII, Winter, 1967, pp. 85–95.
- James D. Hardy Jr., "Probate Racketeering in Colonial Louisiana", Louisiana History, vol. IX, Spring, 1968, pp. 109–121. "Probate Racketeering . . . ", has been reprinted in Mark T. Carleton, Perry H. Howard, Joseph R. Parker, eds., Readings in Louisiana Politics, (Baton Rouge, LA: Claitor's Press, 1975), pp. 35–45.
- James D. Hardy Jr., "Commentary on: Claude C. Sturgill, 'Whatever Happened to the Histories of . . . ?'", Proceedings of the Fourth Meeting of the French Colonies Historical Society, (1978), pp. 204–206.
- James D. Hardy Jr., "A Slave Sale in Antebellum New Orleans", Southern Studies, vol. XXIII, #3, Fall, 1984, pp. 306–314.
- James D. Hardy Jr., "The Banality of Slavery", Southern Studies, vol. XXV, #2, Summer, 1986, pp. 187–196.
- James D. Hardy Jr. and Billy M. Seay, "Honors at Louisiana State University: A Reconstructionist Reorganization", Forum For Honors, Spring, 1986, pp. 3–10.
- James D. Hardy Jr., and Robert B. Robinson, "An Actio de Peculio' in Ante-Bellum Alabama", The Journal of Legal History, (London), vol. 11, #3, December, 1990, pp. 364–371.
- James D. Hardy Jr., and Robert B. Robinson, "The Roman Law and Louisiana Slavery: An Example of Mortgage", Southern Studies, (new series), vol. I, #4, Winter, 1990, pp. 355–376.
- James D. Hardy Jr., and Robert B. Robinson, "A Peculiarity of the Peculiar Institution: An Alabama Case", The Alabama Review, vol. XLI, #1, January, 1992, pp. 17–25.
- James D. Hardy Jr., and Gale H. Carrithers, Jr., "Love, Power, Dust Royall, Gavelkinde: Donne's Politics", John Donne Journal, vol. XI, #1-2, 1992, pp. 39–58.
- James D. Hardy Jr. and Robert B. Robinson, “Freedom and Domicile Jurisprudence in Louisiana: Lunsford v. Coquillon”, Louisiana History, vol. XXXIX, No. 3 (Summer 1998) 293–317.
- James D. Hardy Jr., and Leonard Stanton, “Magical Realism in the Tales of Nikolai Gogol,” Janus Head, 5.2, Fall 2002, pp. 126–139 also on Internet at www.janushead.org/5-2/hardystanton.pdf
- James D. Hardy Jr. and Leonard J. Hochberg, “The Underside of Globalization: Terrorism, Economic Efficiency and National Insecurity”, Business Research Yearbook Global Business Perspectives, X (2003), 897–902.
- Leonard J. Hochberg and James D. Hardy, Jr., “‘Connecting the Dots’: A Preliminary Assessment of Nodes and Links in a Terrorist Supply Chain”, Business Research Yearbook Global Business Perspectives, X (2003), 854–859.
- Leonard J. Hochberg and James D. Hardy, Jr., “Strategic Choices and Globalization: Friedman's Model of the Post-Cold War Era Reconfigured,” Competition Forum I, 1 (2003), 658–662.
- Leonard J. Hochberg and James D. Hardy, Jr., “Policy as an Extension of War: Globalization and Empire in the Formation of the Post-Cold War Era,” Competition Forum I, 1 (2003), 663–668.
- James D. Hardy Jr., “The Silent Voice in Geo-Strategic Analysis”, Competition Forum I, 1 (2003), 668–673.
- Leonard J. Hochberg and James D. Hardy, Jr., “The Eagle Soars: A Comment on Wallerstein's ‘The Eagle Has Crash Landed,’” International Journal of Commerce and Management, 13, 3-4 (2003), 73-82.
- James D. Hardy Jr., and Leonard J. Hochberg, “Strategies of Maritime Empire: Lessons Drawn from Edwardian England in Leadership and Geopolitics,” Business Research Yearbook, XI (2004), 367–372.
- Leonard J. Hochberg and James D. Hardy, Jr., “Geostrategy and the Periclean Dilemma: Lessons Drawn from the Athenian Maritime Empire,” Business Research Yearbook, XI (2004), 372–377.
- Paul R. Baier & James d. Hardy, Jr., “Honors Colleges and Law Schools: A Decennial Digest,” The Legal Studies Forum, vol. XXXII, No. 2, 2008, pp. 914–952.

=== Articles published online ===
- James D. Hardy, Jr., and Leonard J. Hochberg, “ The Visualization of Cartographic Information: A Review Essay of Six Civil War Atlases”, Civil War Book Review, winter, 2006, 8 pp
- James D. Hardy, Jr., Leonard Hochberg, Geoffrey Sloan, “Winning the War; Losing the Peace: When Victory is Tantamount to Defeat,” posted on the Mackinder Forum, (mackinderforum. org), (2010), 27 pp.
- James D. Hardy, Jr., Leonard Hochberg, “Voyage to Gaza: Geopolitics of the Jihadist Flotilla,” posted on the Mackinder Forum, (mackinderforum.org), (2010), 56 pp.
- James D. Hardy, Jr., Korey D. Harvey, Leonard Hochberg, “An Arabist Administration?”, posted on the Mackinder Forum (mackinderforum.org), (2010)
- James D. Hardy, Jr., “Last Lecture; At Least So Far,” posted on Doggesbreakfast.

=== Occasional (refereed) pieces ===
- Leonard J. Hochberg and James D. Hardy, Jr. “Post War Iraq: Ironies of The American War for Iraqi Liberation,” posted on New Mexico Independence Research (NMIRI) website (http://www.zianet.com/nmiri/ironies_amercianwar.html), May 8, 2003.
- James D. Hardy, Jr. and Leonard J. Hochberg, “War, Peace and Oil in Iraq,” posted on NMIRI website (http://www.zianet.com/nmiri/story.html), June 4. 2003
- Leonard J. Hochberg and James D. Hardy, Jr., “Creating Democracy in Iraq?” posted on NMIRI website (website (http://www.zianet.com/nmiri/story.html), June 19. 2003.
- James D. Hardy, Jr. and Leonard J. Hochberg, “Palestinian Community,” posted on NMIRI website (http://www.zianet.com/nmiri/story.html), August 28, 2003: Current “story of the week.”
- James D. Hardy, Jr., “Joseph II”, “Frederick William I”, and “Frederick the Great”, three short articles in the Dictionary of Early Modern Europe (New York: Scribners,).

=== Recent articles ===
- War, Peace and Oil in Iraq (with Leonard Hochberg, Ph.D.) New Mexico Independent Research Institute
- Creating Democracy in Iraq? (with Leonard Hochberg, Ph.D.) New Mexico Independent Research Institute
- Palestinian Community (with Leonard Hochberg, Ph.D.) New Mexico Independent Research Institute

=== Introductions ===
- James D. Hardy, Jr., “Introduction.” Winston De Ville, Gulf Coast Colonials, (Baton Rouge, 1968).
- Leonard J. Stanton and James D. Hardy, Jr., “A Soul's Journey.” An introduction to Fyodor Dostoyevsky, Crime and Punishment (New York: Signet Classic, 1999).
- James D. Hardy, Jr., Introduction, George H. Jones, ed., A Northern Confederate at Johnson's Island Prison: The Civil War Diaries of James Parks Caldwell, (Jefferson, North Carolina, 2010, McFarland)
