= Zell Kravinsky =

American investor and utilitarian

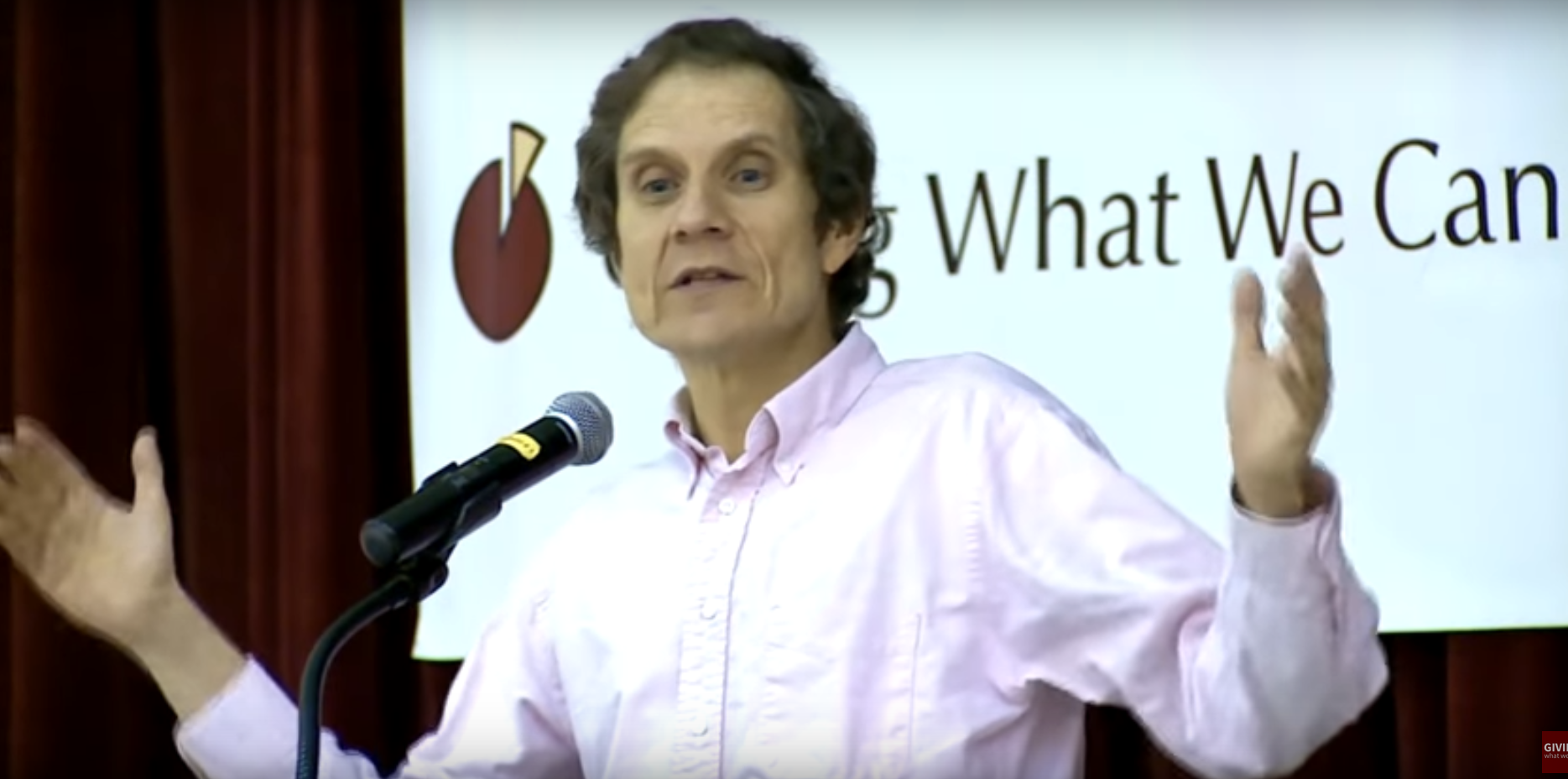
- Kravinsky giving a talk for Giving What We Can at Rutgers University in 2012
- Education: B.A. Dartmouth College; PhD University of Pennsylvania
- Occupations: Real estate developer Professor; Philanthropist

Zell Kravinsky is an American investor and utilitarian who is known for making a non-directed kidney donation to a stranger and for donating over $45 million of his personal wealth to charity, with the largest individual donation going to the Centers for Disease Control and Prevention (CDC). He is also a poet.

== Early life and education ==
Kravinsky was born to a Jewish family and earned two Ph.D. degrees from the University of Pennsylvania, one in 1989 in Rhetoric with a dissertation on Aristotle’s topoi, and the other in 1994 in English Literature with a dissertation on paradoxical polysemy in Milton's Paradise Lost. He also completed required courses for a third doctoral degree, in cultural anthropology from The New School For Social Research, but did not take the preliminary examination or write a dissertation. His B.A. from Dartmouth College was in Asian Studies, with a specialty in Indian Studies.

== Career ==
He lectured full-time at Penn for some years, was a Faculty in Residence for four years, and one year was selected, in the University's published book of student evaluations, as the most overall highly ranked faculty member at Penn. Kravinsky then worked for insurance companies designing and teaching training workshops in management development; taught disabled children in inner-city Philadelphia schools; and taught Transcendental Meditation.

== Philanthropy ==
After amassing a real estate fortune, having started with one thousand dollars, Kravinsky gave away virtually all of it to various charities, concentrating on public health organizations. Specifically, he donated almost all of the $45 million he amassed in real estate to charities dealing with improving health; he made the largest individual contribution ever to the foundation supporting the United States government Centers for Disease Control and Prevention (CDC), and also made major donations to The Johns Hopkins Bloomberg School of Public Health and to the Ohio State University College of Public Health.

== Kidney donation ==
After Kravinsky learned that many African-Americans have difficulty obtaining kidneys from family members, he sought out a hospital in Philadelphia that would allow him to donate one of his kidneys to a lower-income black person.

According to Peter Singer, writing in The New York Times, Kravinsky justified the donation mathematically when speaking to Singer's students, noting that the chances of dying as a result of the procedure would have been about 1 in 4,000. Kravinsky believed that, under the circumstances, "to withhold a kidney from someone who would otherwise die means valuing one’s own life at 4,000 times that of a stranger", a ratio he termed "obscene."

Following the kidney donation, Kravinsky did several interviews with the media, including a radio conference with Robert Siegel of NPR and a TV appearance on CBS among others. During some of these public interviews, Kravinsky argued that should someone be, for instance, on the verge of curing cancer but would die unless Kravinsky were to donate his second kidney, that being the only match in the world, that it would be morally correct to donate the kidney in order that millions of people would be saved. Kravinsky has noted that this admittedly theoretical and highly improbable scenario is the logical extension of someone risking his life by jumping into icy water to save a child, or a soldier cradling a hand grenade to save his buddies.

He is mentioned in former President Bill Clinton's book Giving, and in an article in the December 10, 2008 issue of the Journal of the American Medical Association, The Economics of Health Equity.
