= Transplantation (medicine) =

Medical procedure

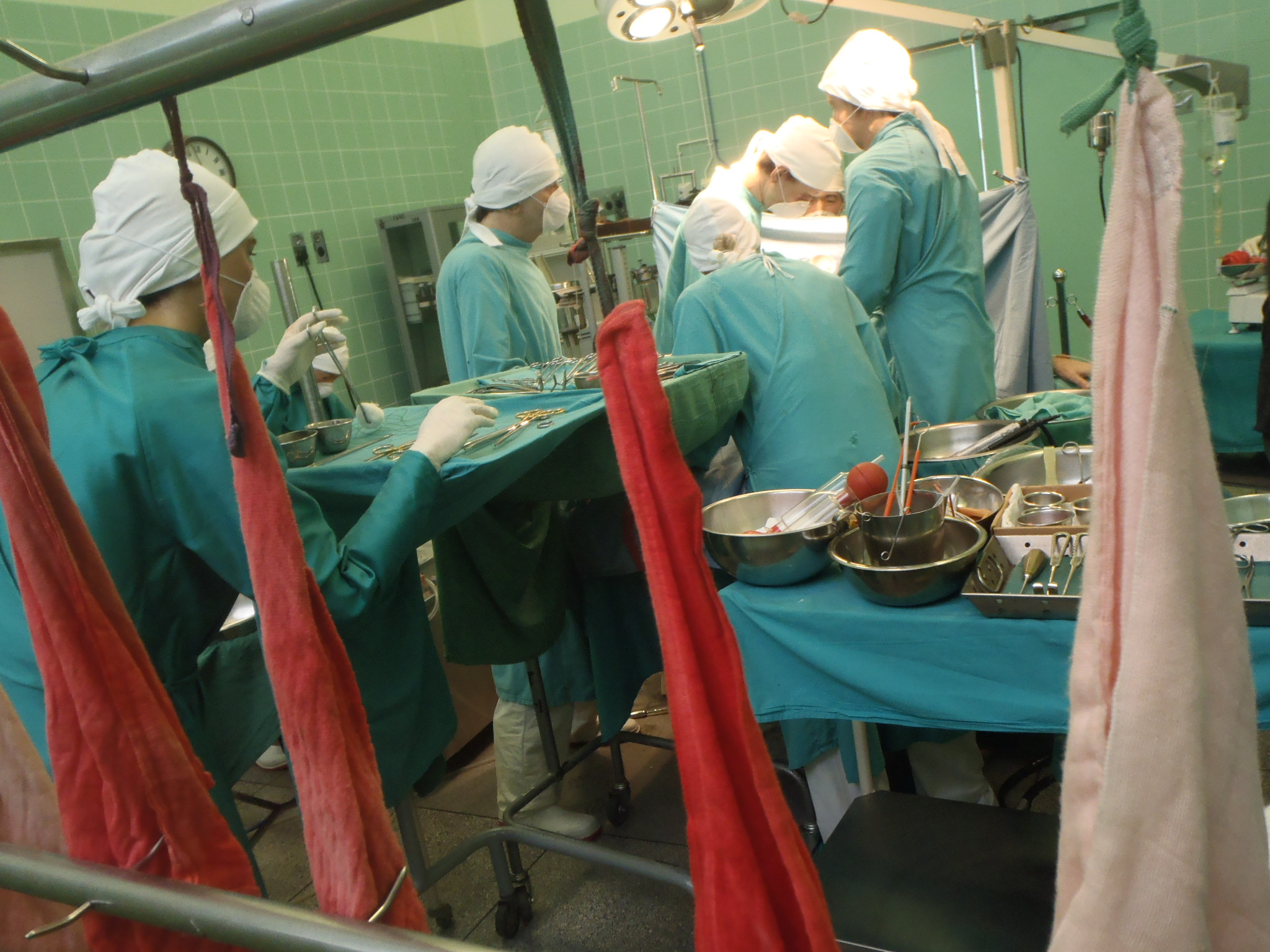
- Reenactment of the first heart transplant, performed in South Africa
- MeSH: D016377

Transplant surgeon
Occupation
- Names: Physician; Surgeon
- Occupation type: Specialty
- Activity sectors: Medicine, Surgery

Description
- Education required: Doctor of Medicine (M.D.); Doctor of Osteopathic medicine (D.O.); Bachelor of Medicine, Bachelor of Surgery (M.B.B.S., MBChB)
- Fields of employment: Hospitals, Clinics

Transplantation is a medical procedure in which an organ, tissue, or cells are removed from one organism and placed in a recipient organism, often to replace a damaged or missing function. The donor and recipient may be at the same location, or organs may be transported from a donor site to another location. Organs and tissues that are transplanted within the same person's body are called autografts. Transplants that are recently performed between two subjects of the same species are called allografts. Allografts can either be from a living or cadaveric source.

Organs that have been successfully transplanted include the heart, kidneys, liver, lungs, pancreas, intestine, thymus and uterus. Tissues include bones, tendons (both referred to as musculoskeletal grafts), corneae, skin, heart valves, nerves and veins. Worldwide, kidneys remain the most commonly transplanted organs, followed by liver and heart. Global analyses indicate that available transplants meet a minority of worldwide need, with the Transplant Observatory reporting substantial gaps between demand and supply and year-to-year increases in registered transplant activity in recent data releases. J. Hartwell Harrison performed the first organ removal for transplant in 1954 as part of the first kidney transplant. Cornea and musculoskeletal grafts are the most commonly transplanted tissues; these outnumber organ transplants by more than tenfold.

Organ donors may be living individuals, or deceased due to either brain death or circulatory death. Tissues can be recovered from donors who have died from circulatory or brain death within 24 hours after cardiac arrest. Unlike organs, most tissues (with the exception of corneas) can be preserved and stored—also known as "banked"—for up to five years. Transplantation raises a number of bioethical issues, including the definition of death, when and how consent should be given for an organ to be transplanted, and payment for organs for transplantation. Other ethical issues include transplantation tourism (medical tourism) and more broadly the socio-economic context in which organ procurement or transplantation may occur. A particular problem is organ trafficking. There is also the ethical issue of holding out false hope to patients.

Transplantation medicine is one of the most challenging and complex areas of modern medicine. Some of the key areas for medical management are the problems of transplant rejection, during which the body has an immune response to the transplanted organ, possibly leading to transplant failure and the need to immediately remove the organ from the recipient. When possible, transplant rejection can be reduced through serotyping to determine the most appropriate donor-recipient match and through the use of immunosuppressant drugs.

As of September 9, 2022, the United States reached one million cumulative transplants according to the Organ Procurement and Transplantation Network (OPTN), with kidneys being the most common globally. Challenges include global shortages, with only 10-20% of needs met, and inequities in access. Recent advances include xenotransplantation (e.g., clinical trials and case reports of genetically modified porcine organs implanted into humans that have provided early safety and feasibility data and identified important infectious and immunologic risks), machine perfusion, and normothermic ex-vivo perfusion systems that have extended preservation intervals and improved graft assessment prior to transplant.

== Types of transplant ==
=== Autograft ===
Autografts are the transplant of tissue to the same person (e.g., kidney for nutcracker syndrome or ex vivo liver resection for tumors) to minimize rejection. Sometimes this is done with surplus tissue, tissue that can regenerate, or tissues more desperately needed elsewhere (examples include skin grafts, vein extraction for CABG, etc.). Sometimes an autograft is done to remove the tissue and then treat it or the person before returning it (examples include stem cell autograft and storing blood in advance of surgery). Autografts involve transplanting tissue within the same individual, such as skin for burns or veins for bypass surgery; rotationplasty relocates a foot/ankle to replace a knee in cancer cases. No immunosuppression needed due to genetic identity.

=== Allograft and allotransplantation ===
An allograft is a transplant of an organ or tissue between two genetically non-identical members of the same species. Most human tissue and organ transplants are allografts. Due to the genetic difference between the organ and the recipient, the recipient's immune system will identify the organ as foreign and attempt to destroy it, causing transplant rejection. The risk of transplant rejection can be estimated by measuring the panel-reactive antibody level.

==== Isograft ====
An isograft is a subset of allograft in which organs or tissues are transplanted from a donor to a genetically identical recipient (such as an identical twin). Isografts are differentiated from other types of transplants because while they are anatomically identical to allografts, they do not trigger an immune response.

=== Xenograft and xenotransplantation ===
A xenograft is a transplant of organs or tissue from one species to another. An example is porcine heart valve transplant, which is quite common and successful. Another example is attempted piscine–primate (fish to non-human primate) transplant of pancreatic islets. The latter research study was intended to pave the way for potential human use if successful. However, xenotransplantation is often an extremely dangerous type of transplant because of the increased risk of non-functional compatibility, rejection, and disease carried in the tissue. In the opposite direction, attempts are being made to devise a way to transplant human fetal hearts and kidneys into animals for future transplantation into human patients to address the shortage of donor organs.

=== Domino transplants ===
In people with cystic fibrosis (CF), where both lungs need to be replaced, it is a technically easier operation with a higher rate of success to replace both the heart and lungs of the recipient with those of the donor. As the recipient's original heart is usually healthy, it can then be transplanted into a second recipient in need of a heart transplant, thus making the person with CF a living heart donor.

In a 2016 case at Stanford Medical Center, a complex set of transplant surgeries involved two patients and three surgical teams. The first patient, a woman with cystic fibrosis, required a heart-lung transplant due to the disease causing one lung to expand and the other to shrink, displacing her heart. Her heart was subsequently donated to a second patient—a woman with right ventricular dysplasia, a condition that caused a dangerously abnormal heart rhythm. The dual procedures also involved a third team responsible for retrieving the heart and lungs from a recently deceased donor. Both recipients recovered well and had the opportunity to meet six weeks after their simultaneous surgeries.

Another example of this situation occurs with a special form of liver transplant in which the recipient has familial amyloid polyneuropathy, a disease where the liver slowly produces a protein that damages other organs. The recipient's liver can then be transplanted into an older person for whom the effects of the disease will not necessarily contribute significantly to mortality.

This term also refers to a series of living donor transplants in which one donor donates to the highest recipient on the waiting list and the transplant center utilizes that donation to facilitate multiple transplants. These other transplants are otherwise impossible due to blood type or antibody barriers to transplantation. The "Good Samaritan" kidney is transplanted into one of the other recipients, whose donor in turn donates his or her kidney to an unrelated recipient. This method allows all organ recipients to get a transplant even if their living donor is not a match for them. This further benefits people below any of these recipients on waiting lists, as they move closer to the top of the list for a deceased-donor organ. Johns Hopkins Hospital in Baltimore and Northwestern University's Northwestern Memorial Hospital have received significant attention for pioneering transplants of this kind. In February 2012, the last link in a record 60-person domino chain of 30 kidney transplants was completed. In 2015, that record was surpassed with a chain that involved 70 surgeries, 35 transplants, and 25 transplant centers.

In May 2023, New York Presbyterian Morgan Stanley Children's Hospital performed the first domino heart transplantation in a baby, eventually saving two baby girls.

In June 2026, the Pakistan Kidney and Liver Institute (PKLI) in Lahore said its team had completed 10 liver transplants within roughly 23 hours, using organs from three donors to treat nine children and one adult. Described by PKLI as its largest domino-auxiliary paediatric liver transplant initiative to date, the procedures reportedly included seven domino liver transplants and eight Auxiliary Partial Orthotopic Liver Transplants (APOLT). PKLI officials said Guinness World Records was in the process of verifying the claim.

=== ABO-incompatible transplants ===
Because very young children (generally under 12 months, but often as old as 24 months) do not have a well-developed immune system, it is possible for them to receive organs from otherwise incompatible donors. This is known as ABO-incompatible (ABOi) transplantation. Graft survival and people's mortality are approximately the same between ABOi and ABO-compatible (ABOc) recipients. While focus has been on infant heart transplants, the principles generally apply to other forms of solid organ transplantation.

The most important factors are that the recipient not have produced isohemagglutinins, and that they have low levels of T cell-independent antigens. United Network for Organ Sharing (UNOS) regulations allow for ABOi transplantation in children under two years of age if isohemagglutinin titers are 1:4 or below, and if there is no matching ABOc recipient. Studies have shown that the period under which a recipient may undergo ABOi transplantation may be prolonged by exposure to nonself A and B antigens. Furthermore, should the recipient (for example, type B-positive with a type AB-positive graft) require eventual retransplantation, the recipient may receive a new organ of either blood type.

Limited success has been achieved in ABO-incompatible heart transplants in adults, though this requires that the adult recipients have low levels of anti-A or anti-B antibodies. Renal transplantation is more successful, with similar long-term graft survival rates to ABOc transplants.

== Organs and tissues transplanted ==
=== Eye ===
- Eyeball (First successful transplantation of a non-functional eye was performed in 2024)

=== Chest ===
- Heart (deceased-donor only; porcine xenograft attempted)
- Lung (deceased-donor and living-related lung transplantation)
- Thymus
- Pulmonary artery: First successful main pulmonary artery transplantation to extend thymus cancer treatment possibility was performed in Switzerland at Ente Ospedaliero Cantonale in 2023

=== Abdomen ===
- Kidney (deceased-donor and living-donor; porcine xenograft attempted)
- Liver (deceased-donor, which enables donation of a whole liver; and living-donor, where each donor can provide up to 70% of a liver)
- Pancreas (deceased-donor only; a very severe type of diabetes ensues if a live person's entire pancreas is removed)
- Intestine (deceased-donor and living-donor; normally refers to the small intestine)
- Stomach (deceased-donor only)
- Uterus (deceased-donor only)
- Testis (deceased-donor and living-donor)
- Penis (deceased-donor only)

=== Tissues, cells and fluids ===
- Hand (deceased-donor only), see first recipient Clint Hallam
- Cornea (deceased-donor only) see the ophthalmologist Eduard Zirm
- Skin, including face replant (autograft) and face transplant (extremely rare)
- Islets of Langerhans (pancreas islet cells) (deceased-donor and living-donor)
- Bone marrow or adult stem cell (living-donor and autograft)
- Blood transfusion, whole blood or fractionated blood products (living-donor and autograft)
- Blood vessels (autograft and deceased-donor)
- Heart valve (deceased-donor, living-donor and xenograft [porcine/bovine])
- Bone (deceased-donor and living-donor)

== Indications for transplantation ==
- Kidney transplantation is becoming increasingly common and is the preferred treatment for end-stage renal failure.
- Liver transplantation is the only curative therapy for end-stage liver disease, and the liver is the second most frequently transplanted solid organ.
- Pancreatic transplantation is a complex surgical procedure performed in patients with severe chronic diabetes, often in association with renal transplantation.
- Heart transplantation is increasingly performed in patients with end-stage heart failure, most often related to ischemic and non-ischemic cardiomyopathies.

== Complications ==
The main complications are procedural complications, infection, acute rejection, cardiac allograft vasculopathy and malignancy.

Non-vascular and vascular complications can occur in the initial post-transplant phase and at later stages. Overall postoperative complications after kidney transplantation occur in approximately 12% to 25% of kidney transplant patients.

Following transplantation, recipients undergo regular laboratory monitoring (e.g., organ-specific function tests such as serum creatinine for kidney or liver function tests for liver, and immunosuppressant trough levels), imaging (e.g., ultrasound/Doppler studies for transplanted kidneys and vascular anastomoses), and tissue biopsy when indicated to evaluate graft function and detect rejection.

=== Transplantation in obese individuals ===
Until recently, people with obesity were not considered appropriate candidate donors for renal transplantation. In 2009, the physicians at the University of Illinois Medical Center performed the first robotic renal transplantation in an obese recipient and have continued to transplant people with a body mass index over 35 using robotic surgery. As of January 2014, over 100 people who would otherwise have been turned down because of their weight have successfully been transplanted.

=== Human herpesvirus 6 (HHV-6) reactivation ===
Human herpesvirus 6 (HHV-6) reactivation emerged as a notable concern in pediatric liver transplantation, potentially influencing both graft and recipient health. HHV-6, prevalent in a substantial portion of the population, can manifest in liver transplant recipients with inherited chromosomally integrated HHV-6 (iciHHV-6), predisposing them to heightened risks of complications such as graft-versus-host disease and allograft rejections. Recent case studies underscore the significance of HHV-6 reactivation, demonstrating its ability to infect liver grafts and impact recipient outcomes. Clinical management involves early detection, targeted antiviral therapy, and vigilant monitoring post-transplantation, with future research aimed at optimizing preventive measures and therapeutic interventions to mitigate the impact of HHV-6 reactivation on pediatric liver transplant outcomes.

== Types of donor ==
Organ donors may be living or may have died of brain death or circulatory death. Most deceased donors are those who have been pronounced brain dead. Brain dead means the cessation of brain function, typically after receiving an injury (either traumatic or pathological) to the brain, or otherwise cutting off blood circulation to the brain (drowning, suffocation, etc.). Breathing is maintained via artificial sources, which, in turn, maintains heartbeat. Once brain death has been declared, the person can be considered for organ donation. Criteria for brain death vary. Because less than 3% of all deaths in the US are the result of brain death, the overwhelming majority of deaths are ineligible for organ donation, resulting in severe shortages. Patients that have been pronounced brain dead are one of the most common and ideal donors, since often these donors are young and healthy, thus leading to high quality organs.

In certain cases—particularly when an individual has suffered severe brain injury and is not expected to survive without artificial ventilation and mechanical support—organ donation after circulatory death (DCD) is possible. Regardless of any decision about donation, the individual's family may choose to withdraw life-sustaining support. When withdrawal of life-sustaining treatment is planned, and death is expected within an institutionally acceptable interval, some controlled DCD pathways allow withdrawal to occur in an operating room so that organ retrieval can proceed immediately after the legally required observation interval following circulatory arrest. Protocols and the required no-touch observation period vary between jurisdictions and are described in national best-practice guidance.

Tissues may be recovered from donors who die of either brain or circulatory death. In general, tissues may be recovered from donors up to 24 hours past the cessation of heartbeat. In contrast to organs, most tissues (with the exception of corneas) can be preserved and stored for up to five years, meaning they can be "banked." Also, more than 60 grafts may be obtained from a single tissue donor. Because of these three factors – the ability to recover from a non-heart-beating donor, the ability to bank tissue, and the number of grafts available from each donor – tissue transplants are much more common than organ transplants. Industry and regulator estimates report that millions of tissue grafts are distributed and that over one million tissue transplants are performed in the United States annually; for example, American Association of Tissue Banks documentation and related federal filings reference distribution of several million allografts and estimate more than one million tissue transplants per year in the U.S.

=== Living donor ===
In living donors, the individual remains alive and donates a renewable tissue, cell, or fluid—such as blood or skin—or an organ or part of an organ where the remaining portion can regenerate or compensate for the loss. This primarily includes donations such as a single kidney, a portion of the liver, a lung lobe, or a segment of the small intestine. Advances in regenerative medicine may one day enable the creation of laboratory-grown organs using a person's own cells, either through stem cell technology or by harvesting healthy cells from failing organs.

=== Deceased donor ===
Deceased donors (formerly cadaveric) are people who have been declared brain-dead and whose organs are kept viable by ventilators or other mechanical mechanisms until they can be excised for transplantation. Apart from brainstem-dead donors, who have formed the majority of deceased donors for the last 20 years, there is increasing use of after-circulatory-death donors (formerly non-heart-beating donors) to increase the potential pool of donors as demand for transplants continues to grow. Prior to the legal recognition of brain death in the 1980s, all deceased organ donors had died of circulatory death. These organs have inferior outcomes to organs from a brain-dead donor. For instance, patients who underwent liver transplantation using donation-after-circulatory-death allografts have been shown to have significantly lower graft survival than those from donation-after-brain-death allografts due to biliary complications and primary nonfunction in liver transplantation. However, given the scarcity of suitable organs and the number of people who die waiting, any potentially suitable organ must be considered. Jurisdictions with medically assisted suicide may co-ordinate organ donations from that source.

== Allocation of organs ==
In most countries there is a shortage of suitable organs for transplantation. Countries often have formal systems in place to manage the process of determining who is an organ donor and in what order organ recipients receive available organs.

The overwhelming majority of deceased-donor organs in the United States are allocated by federal contract to the Organ Procurement and Transplantation Network, held since it was created by the Organ Transplant Act of 1984, by the United Network for Organ Sharing, or UNOS. (UNOS does not handle donor cornea tissue; corneal donor tissue is usually handled by multiple eye banks with guidance from the Eye Bank Association of America (EBAA) and the Food and Drug Administration (FDA). Individual regional organ procurement organizations, all members of the Organ Procurement and Transplantation Network, are responsible for the identification of suitable donors and the collection of the donated organs. UNOS (the United Network for Organ Sharing) allocates organs according to methodologies deemed most equitable by experts in the field. Allocation criteria vary by organ type and are periodically revised. For instance, liver allocation is partly determined by the MELD (Model for End-Stage Liver Disease) score, an evidence-based measure derived from laboratory values that reflect the severity of a patient's liver disease.

The foundation for national organ policy was laid with the passage of the National Organ Transplant Act (NOTA) in 1984, which led to the creation of the Organ Procurement and Transplantation Network (OPTN). The OPTN maintains the national organ transplant registry and ensures fair and equitable distribution of organs. Additionally, the Scientific Registry of Transplant Recipients (SRTR) was established to support continuous research on transplant outcomes and recipient health.

In 2000, the Children's Health Act was enacted, mandating that NOTA account for the specific needs and considerations of pediatric patients in organ allocation decisions.

An example of "line jumping" occurred in 2003 at Duke University, when physicians attempted to correct a critical error in an initial transplant. A teenage girl received a heart-lung transplant with organs of an incompatible blood type. Following the mistake, she was given priority for a second transplant, despite being in such poor physical condition that she would not typically qualify as a viable candidate. The case raised ethical concerns about fairness in organ allocation and the influence of public and institutional pressure on transplant decisions.

In an April 2008 article published in The Guardian, Steven Tsui, head of the transplant team at Papworth Hospital in the UK, addressed the ethical dilemma of managing patient expectations in heart transplantation. He explained, "Conventionally, we would say if people's life expectancy was a year or less, we would consider them a candidate for a heart transplant. But we also have to manage expectations. If we know that in an average year we will do 30 heart transplants, there is no point putting 60 people on our waiting list, because we know half of them will die, and it's not right to give them false hope." His remarks highlight the ethical balance between offering access to life-saving treatment and the responsibility to avoid unrealistic expectations in the face of limited organ availability."

Directed or targeted donation—while experiencing a slight increase in popularity—remains relatively rare. In such cases, the family of a deceased donor (often in accordance with the donor's expressed wishes) requests that an organ be allocated to a specific individual, thereby bypassing the standard organ allocation system. In the United States, waiting times for organ transplants can vary significantly depending on the availability of organs across different UNOS regions. By contrast, in countries such as the United Kingdom, only medical criteria and a patient's position on the waiting list determine organ allocation, with no allowance for directed donation outside of immediate family or exceptional circumstances.

One of the more widely publicized cases of directed donation occurred in 1994 with the Chester and Patti Szuber transplant. This marked the first known instance in which a parent received a heart donated by their own child. Although accepting a heart from his recently deceased daughter was an incredibly difficult decision, the Szuber family agreed that Patti would have wanted her heart to be given to her father.

Access to organ transplantation is one reason for the growth of medical tourism.

== Reasons for donation and ethical issues ==
=== Living related donors ===
Living related donors donate to family members or friends in whom they have an emotional investment. The risk of surgery is offset by the psychological benefit of not losing someone related to them, or not seeing them suffer the ill effects of waiting on a list.

==== Paired exchange ====
Diagram of an exchange between otherwise incompatible pairs

A "paired-exchange" is a technique that matches willing living donors with compatible recipients using serotyping. For example, a spouse may be willing to donate a kidney to their partner, but cannot since there is a lack of a biological match. The willing spouse's kidney is donated to a matching recipient who also has an incompatible but willing spouse. The second donor must match the first recipient to complete the pair exchange. Typically, the surgeries are scheduled simultaneously in case one of the donors decides to back out, and the couples are kept anonymous from each other until after the transplant. Paired-donor exchange, led by work in the New England Program for Kidney Exchange as well as at Johns Hopkins University and the Ohio organ procurement organizations, may more efficiently allocate organs and lead to more transplants.

Paired exchange programs were popularized by the New England Journal of Medicine article "Ethics of a paired-kidney-exchange program" in 1997 by L.F. Ross. It was also proposed by Felix T. Rapport in 1986 as part of his initial proposals for live-donor transplants, "The case for a living emotionally related international kidney donor exchange registry" in Transplant Proceedings. A paired exchange is the simplest case of a much larger exchange registry program where willing donors are matched with any number of compatible recipients. Transplant exchange programs have been suggested as early as 1970: "A cooperative kidney typing and exchange program."

The first pair exchange transplant in the US was in 2001 at Johns Hopkins Hospital. The first complex multihospital kidney exchange involving 12 people was performed in February 2009 by The Johns Hopkins Hospital, Barnes-Jewish Hospital in St. Louis, and Integris Baptist Medical Center in Oklahoma City. Another 12-person multihospital kidney exchange was performed four weeks later by Cooperman Barnabas Medical Center in Livingston, New Jersey, Newark Beth Israel Medical Center, and NewYork-Presbyterian Hospital. Surgical teams led by Johns Hopkins continue to pioneer this field with more complex chains of exchange, such as an eight-way multihospital kidney exchange. In December 2009, a 13-organ 13-recipient matched kidney exchange took place, coordinated through Georgetown University Hospital and Washington Hospital Center, Washington, DC.

=== Good Samaritan ===
The term "good Samaritan" or "altruistic" has been used to describe an organ donation by an individual who donates an organ to someone with whom the donor has no prior affiliation. Donating one's organs without the intention of personal gain; it is out of pure selflessness. On the other hand, the current allocation system does not assess a donor's motive, so altruistic donation is not a requirement. Some people choose to do this out of a personal need to donate. Some donate to the next person on the list; others use some method of choosing a recipient based on criteria important to them. Websites are being developed that facilitate such donations. Over half of the members of the Jesus Christians, an Australian religious group, have donated kidneys in such a fashion.

=== Financial compensation ===
Monetary compensation for organ donors, in the form of reimbursement for out-of-pocket expenses, has been legalised in Australia; however, it has been strictly limited to the case of a kidney transplant. Moreover, in Singapore, the country's government offers minimal reimbursement in the case of other forms of organ harvesting. Kidney disease organizations in both countries have expressed their support.

In compensated donation, donors get money or other compensation in exchange for their organs. This practice is common in some parts of the world, whether legal or not, and is one of the many factors driving medical tourism.

In the illegal black market, the donors may not get sufficient after-operation care, the price of a kidney may be above $160,000, middlemen take most of the money, the operation is more dangerous to both the donor and receiver, and the receiver often gets hepatitis or HIV. In Iran's legal markets, the price of a kidney varies from $2,000 to $4,000.

An article by Gary Becker and Julio Elias, "Introducing Incentives in the market for Live and Cadaveric Organ Donations", stated that a free market could help solve the problem of a scarcity in organ transplants. Their economic modeling was able to estimate the price tag for human kidneys ($15,000) and human livers ($32,000).

The consensus of American Economic Association members is that organ trade should be allowed, with 70% in favor and 16% opposed. Another literature review, looking at the publications of 72 economic researchers who have studied organ trade, reached a similar conclusion: 68% supported legalization of the organ trade, while only 21% opposed it. One scholar argues that once the organ trade became legalized in Iran, it did not end the under-the-table sales in organs.

In the United States, the National Organ Transplant Act of 1984 made organ sales illegal. In the United Kingdom, the Human Organ Transplants Act 1989 first made organ sales illegal, and has been superseded by the Human Tissue Act 2004. In 2007, two major European conferences recommended against the sale of organs. The recent emergence of websites and personal advertisements for organs among listed transplant candidates has intensified ethical debates surrounding organ sales, directed donation, "good Samaritan" donation, and current U.S. organ allocation policies. These developments have raised concerns about fairness, equity, and potential exploitation. However, bioethicist Jacob M. Appel has argued that public solicitation of organs through billboards and the internet may ultimately increase the overall supply of organs, potentially benefiting patients awaiting transplants.

In an experimental survey, Elias, Lacetera, and Macis (2019) found that preferences regarding compensation for kidney donors are deeply rooted in moral considerations. Participants particularly opposed direct payments made by patients to donors, viewing such transactions as violations of fairness principles.

Many countries adopt different approaches to organ donation, including the opt-out system, where individuals are presumed donors unless they explicitly decline. Public campaigns and advertisements are also widely used to encourage organ donation. Although such laws and initiatives exist in various countries, organ donation ultimately remains a personal choice and is not mandatory for individuals.

Two books—Kidney for Sale by Owner by Mark Cherry (Georgetown University Press, 2005) and Stakes and Kidneys: Why Markets in Human Body Parts are Morally Imperative by James Stacey Taylor (Ashgate Press, 2005)—advocate for the use of markets to increase the supply of organs available for transplantation. Similarly, in a 2004 journal article, economist Alex Tabarrok argues that permitting the sale of organs and eliminating organ donor waiting lists would increase supply, reduce costs, and lessen social anxiety surrounding organ markets.

Iran has had a legal market for kidneys since 1988. The donor is paid approximately US$1200 by the government and also usually receives additional funds from either the recipient or local charities. The Economist and the Ayn Rand Institute approve and advocate a legal market elsewhere. They argued that if 0.06% of Americans between 19 and 65 were to sell one kidney, the national waiting list would disappear (which, the Economist wrote, happened in Iran). The Economist argued that donating kidneys is no more risky than surrogate motherhood, which can be done legally for pay in most countries.

In Pakistan, 40 percent to 50 percent of the residents of some villages have only one kidney because they have sold the other for a transplant into a wealthy person, probably from another country, said Dr. Farhat Moazam of Pakistan, at a World Health Organization conference. Pakistani donors are offered $2,500 for a kidney but receive only about half of that because middlemen take so much. In Chennai, southern India, poor fishermen and their families sold kidneys after their livelihoods were destroyed by the Indian Ocean tsunami on 26 December 2004. About 100 people, mostly women, sold their kidneys for 40,000–60,000 rupees ($900–1,350). Thilakavathy Agatheesh, 30, who sold a kidney in May 2005 for 40,000 rupees, said, "I used to earn some money selling fish, but now the post-surgery stomach cramps prevent me from going to work." Most kidney sellers say that selling their kidney was a mistake.

In Cyprus in 2010, police closed a fertility clinic under charges of trafficking in human eggs. The Petra Clinic, as it was known locally, brought in women from Ukraine and Russia for egg harvesting and sold the genetic material to foreign fertility tourists. This sort of reproductive trafficking violates laws in the European Union. In 2010, Scott Carney reported for the Pulitzer Center on Crisis Reporting, and the magazine Fast Company explored illicit fertility networks in Spain, the United States, and Israel.

=== Forced donation ===
Increasing concerns have been raised on the international level that certain authorities and governments may be forcibly harvesting organs from individuals considered undesirable, such as prisoners. The World Medical Association has stated that prisoners and other persons in custody are effectively unable to provide free and voluntary consent transparently, their organs must not be used for transplantation.

According to former Chinese Deputy Minister of Health, Huang Jiefu, the practice of transplanting organs from executed prisoners is still occurring as of February 2017. World Journal reported that Huang had admitted that approximately 95% of all organs used for transplantation are from executed prisoners. The lack of a public organ donation program in China is used as a justification for this practice. In July 2006, the Kilgour-Matas report stated, "the source of 41,500 transplants for the six-year period 2000 to 2005 is unexplained" and "we believe that there has been and continues today to be large-scale organ seizures from unwilling Falun Gong practitioners." Investigative journalist Ethan Gutmann estimates 65,000 Falun Gong practitioners were killed for their organs from 2000 to 2008. However, 2016 reports updated the death toll of the 15-year period since the persecution of Falun Gong began, putting the death toll at 150,000 to 1.5 million. In December 2006, after failing to receive credible assurances from the Chinese government about allegations relating to Chinese prisoners, the two major organ transplant hospitals in Queensland, Australia, stopped transplantation training for Chinese surgeons and banned joint research programs into organ transplantation with China.

In May 2008, two United Nations Special Rapporteurs reiterated their requests for "the Chinese government to fully explain the allegation of taking vital organs from Falun Gong practitioners and the source of organs for the sudden increase in organ transplants that has been going on in China since the year 2000." People in other parts of the world are responding to this availability of organs, and a number of individuals (including US and Japanese citizens) have elected to travel to China or India as medical tourists to receive organ transplants which may have been sourced in what might be considered elsewhere to be unethical manner.

== By region ==
Some estimates of the number of transplants performed in various regions of the world have been derived from the Global Burden of Disease Study.

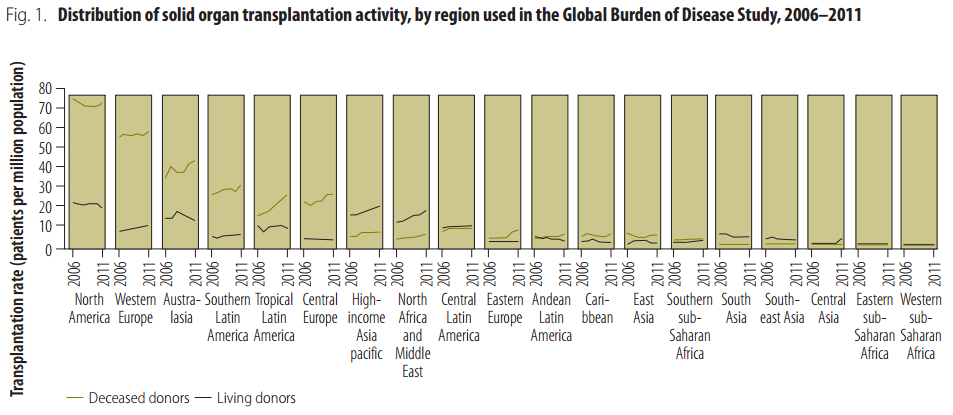
Distribution of solid organ transplantation activity, by region used in the Global Burden of Disease Study, 2006–2011

Transplantation of organs in different regions in 2000
	Kidney (pmp*)	Liver (pmp)	Heart (pmp)
United States	52	19	8
Europe	27	10	4
Africa	11	3.5	1
Asia	3	0.3	0.03
Latin America	13	1.6	0.5
*All numbers per million population			

According to the Council of Europe, Spain through the Spanish Transplant Organization shows the highest worldwide rate of 35.1 donors per million population in 2005 and 33.8 in 2006. In 2011, it was 35.3.

In addition to citizens awaiting organ transplants in the United States and other developed countries, there are extensive waiting lists worldwide. In China, more than 2 million people require organ transplants, while Latin America has approximately 50,000 individuals on waiting lists—90% of whom are awaiting kidney transplants. Thousands more await transplantation across Africa, although data from the continent is less comprehensive. Donor availability and donation practices vary significantly among developing nations.

In Latin America, the donor rate ranges from 40 to 100 per million population per year, comparable to rates in developed countries. However, in countries such as Uruguay, Cuba, and Chile, approximately 90% of organ transplants are sourced from cadaveric donors. In contrast, cadaveric donors account for about 35% of all donors in Saudi Arabia.

There is an ongoing effort to increase the use of cadaveric donors in Asia. However, the widespread practice of living, single kidney donation in India results in a cadaveric donor rate of less than 1 per million population. Despite having one of the highest numbers of transplantation procedures globally—ranking third worldwide—India's overall organ donation rate remains significantly below the global average.

Traditionally, Muslims believe body desecration in life or death to be forbidden, and thus many reject organ transplant. However most Muslim authorities nowadays accept the practice if another life will be saved. As an example, it may be assumed in countries such as Singapore with a cosmopolitan populace that includes Muslims, a special Majlis Ugama Islam Singapura governing body is formed to look after the interests of Singapore's Muslim community over issues that includes their burial arrangements.

Organ transplantation in Singapore is generally overseen by the National Organ Transplant Unit of the Ministry of Health (Singapore). Due to a diversity in mindsets and religious viewpoints, while Muslims on this island are generally not expected to donate their organs even upon death, youth in Singapore are educated on the Human Organ Transplant Act at the age of 18, which is around the age of military conscription. The Organ Donor Registry maintains two types of information, firstly people of Singapore that donate their organs or bodies for transplantation, research or education upon their death, under the Medical (Therapy, Education and Research) Act (MTERA), and secondly people that object to the removal of kidneys, liver, heart and corneas upon death for the purpose of transplantation, under the Human Organ Transplant Act (HOTA). The Live On social awareness movement is also formed to educate Singaporeans on organ donation.

Organ transplantation in China has taken place since the 1960s, and China has one of the largest transplant programmes in the world, peaking at over 13,000 transplants a year by 2004. Organ donation, however, is against Chinese tradition and culture, and involuntary organ donation is illegal under Chinese law. China's transplant programme attracted the attention of international news media in the 1990s due to ethical concerns about the organs and tissue removed from the corpses of executed criminals being commercially traded. In 2006 it became clear that about 41,500 organs had been sourced from Falun Gong practitioners in China since 2000.

With regard to organ transplantation in Israel, there is a severe organ shortage due to religious objections by some rabbis who oppose all organ donations and others who advocate that a rabbi participate in all decision making regarding a particular donor. Approximately one-third of all heart transplants performed on Israeli patients take place in China, with others conducted in Europe. Dr. Jacob Lavee, head of the heart transplant unit at Sheba Medical Center in Tel Aviv, considers "transplant tourism" unethical and asserts that Israeli insurers should not cover its costs. Meanwhile, the Halachic Organ Donor Society (HODS) is actively working to raise awareness and promote participation in organ donation within Jewish communities worldwide.

Transplantation rates also differ based on race, sex, and income. A study done with people beginning long term dialysis showed that the sociodemographic barriers to renal transplantation present themselves even before patients are on the transplant list. For example, different groups express definite interest and complete pretransplant workup at different rates. Previous efforts to create fair transplantation policies had focused on people currently on the transplantation waiting list.

In the United States, nearly 35,000 organ transplants were done in 2017, a 3.4 percent increase over 2016. About 18 percent of these were from living donors – people who gave one kidney or a part of their liver to someone else. But 115,000 Americans remain on waiting lists for organ transplants. By September 2022, the US had reached one million organ transplants overall.

== History ==
Successful human allotransplants have a relatively long history of operative skills that were present long before the necessities for post-operative survival were discovered. Rejection and the side effects of preventing rejection (especially infection and nephropathy) were, are, and may always be the key problem.

Several apocryphal accounts of transplants exist well prior to the scientific understanding and advancements that would be necessary for them to have actually occurred. The Chinese physician Pien Chi'ao reportedly exchanged hearts between a man of strong spirit but weak will with one of a man of weak spirit but strong will in an attempt to achieve balance in each man. Roman Catholic accounts report the 3rd-century saints Damian and Cosmas as replacing the gangrenous or cancerous leg of the Roman deacon Justinian with the leg of a recently deceased Ethiopian in what is known as the Miracle of the Black Leg. Most accounts have the saints performing the transplant in the 4th century, many decades after their deaths; some accounts have them only instructing living surgeons who performed the procedure.

The more likely accounts of early transplants deal with skin transplantation. The first reasonable account is of the Indian surgeon Sushruta in the 2nd century BC, who used autografted skin transplantation in nose reconstruction, a rhinoplasty. Success or failure of these procedures is not well documented. Centuries later, the Italian surgeon Gasparo Tagliacozzi performed successful skin autografts; he also failed consistently with allografts, offering the first suggestion of rejection centuries before that mechanism could possibly be understood. He attributed it to the "force and power of individuality" in his 1596 work De Curtorum Chirurgia per Insitionem.

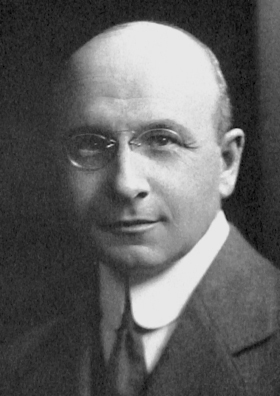
Alexis Carrel: 1912's Nobel Prize for his work on organ transplantation

The first successful corneal allograft transplant was performed in 1837 in a gazelle model; the first successful human corneal transplant, a keratoplastic operation, was performed by Eduard Zirm at Olomouc Eye Clinic, now in the Czech Republic, in 1905.

The first transplant in the modern sense – the implantation of organ tissue in order to replace an organ function – was a thyroid transplant in 1883. It was performed by the Swiss surgeon and later Nobel laureate Theodor Kocher. In the preceding decades Kocher had perfected the removal of excess thyroid tissue in cases of goiter to an extent that he was able to remove the whole organ without the person dying from the operation. Kocher carried out the total removal of the organ in some cases as a measure to prevent recurrent goiter. By 1883, the surgeon noticed that the complete removal of the organ leads to a complex of particular symptoms that we today have learned to associate with a lack of thyroid hormone. Kocher reversed these symptoms by implanting thyroid tissue to these people and thus performed the first organ transplant. In the following years Kocher and other surgeons used thyroid transplantation also to treat thyroid deficiency that appeared spontaneously, without a preceding organ removal.

Thyroid transplantation became the model for a whole new therapeutic strategy: organ transplantation. After the example of the thyroid, other organs were transplanted in the decades around 1900. Some of these transplants were done in animals for purposes of research, where organ removal and transplantation became a successful strategy of investigating the function of organs. Kocher was awarded his Nobel Prize in 1909 for the discovery of the function of the thyroid gland. At the same time, organs were also transplanted for treating diseases in humans. The thyroid gland became the model for transplants of adrenal and parathyroid glands, pancreas, ovary, testicles and kidney. By 1900, the idea that one can successfully treat internal diseases by replacing a failed organ through transplantation had been generally accepted. Pioneering work in the surgical technique of transplantation was made in the early 1900s by the French surgeon Alexis Carrel, with Charles Guthrie, with the transplantation of arteries or veins. Their skillful anastomosis operations and the new suturing techniques laid the groundwork for later transplant surgery and won Carrel the 1912 Nobel Prize in Physiology or Medicine. From 1902, Carrel performed transplant experiments on dogs. Surgically successful in moving kidneys, hearts, and spleens, he was one of the first to identify the problem of rejection, which remained insurmountable for decades. The discovery of transplant immunity by the German surgeon Georg Schöne, various strategies of matching donor and recipient, and the use of different agents for immune suppression did not result in substantial improvement so that organ transplantation was largely abandoned after WWI.

In 1954, the first successful kidney transplant was done at the Brigham & Women's Hospital in Boston. The surgery was performed by American surgeon Dr. Joseph Murray, who received the Nobel Prize in Medicine for his work. The success of this transplant was mostly due to the family relation between the recipient, a Richard Herrick of Maine, and his donor and identical twin brother Ronald. Richard Herrick was in the Navy and became severely ill with acute renal failure. His brother Ronald donated his kidney to Richard, and Richard lived on for another eight years. Prior to this case, transplant recipients did not survive for more than thirty days. Their close family relation meant there was no need for anti-rejection medications, which was not known until this time, so the case shed light on the cause of rejection and of possible anti-rejection medicine.

Major steps in skin transplantation occurred during the First World War, notably in the work of Harold Gillies at Aldershot, United Kingdom. Among his advances was the tubed pedicle graft, which maintained a flesh connection from the donor site until the graft established its own blood flow. Gillies' assistant, Archibald McIndoe, carried on the work into the Second World War as reconstructive surgery. In 1962, the first successful replantation surgery was performed – re-attaching a severed limb and restoring (limited) function and feeling.

Transplant of a single gonad (testis) from a living donor was carried out in early July 1926 in Zaječar, Serbia, by a Russian émigré surgeon Dr. Peter Vasil'evič Kolesnikov. The donor was a convicted murderer, one Ilija Krajan, whose death sentence was commuted to 20 years imprisonment, and he was led to believe that it was done because he had donated his testis to an elderly medical doctor. Both the donor and the receiver survived, but charges were brought in a court of law by the public prosecutor against Dr. Kolesnikov, not for performing the operation, but for lying to the donor.

The first attempted human deceased-donor transplant was performed by the Ukrainian surgeon Yurii Voronyi in the 1930s; but failed due to ischemia. Joseph Murray and J. Hartwell Harrison performed the first successful kidney transplant in 1954. Because the operation transplanted a kidney between identical twins, no immunosuppression was necessary.

In the late 1940s British surgeon Peter Medawar, working for the National Institute for Medical Research, improved the understanding of rejection. Identifying the immune reactions in 1951, Medawar suggested that immunosuppressive drugs could be used. Cortisone had been recently discovered and the more effective azathioprine was identified in 1959, but it was not until the discovery of cyclosporine in 1970 that transplant surgery found a sufficiently powerful immunosuppressive.

There was a successful deceased-donor lung transplant into an emphysema and lung cancer patient in June 1963 by James Hardy at the University of Mississippi Medical Center in Jackson, Mississippi. The patient John Russell survived for eighteen days before dying of kidney failure.

Thomas Starzl of Denver attempted a liver transplant in the same year, but he was not successful until 1967.

In the early 1960s and prior to long-term dialysis becoming available, Keith Reemtsma and his colleagues at Tulane University in New Orleans attempted transplants of chimpanzee kidneys into 13 human patients. Most of these patients only lived one to two months. However, in 1964, a 23-year-old woman lived for nine months and even returned to her job as a school teacher until she suddenly collapsed and died. It was assumed that she died from an acute electrolyte disturbance. At autopsy, the kidneys had not been rejected nor was there any other obvious cause of death. One source states this patient died from pneumonia. Tom Starzl and his team in Colorado used baboon kidneys with six human patients who lived one or two months, but with no longer term survivors. Others in the United States and France had limited experiences.

The heart was a major prize for transplant surgeons. But over and above rejection issues, the heart deteriorates within minutes of death, so any operation would have to be performed at great speed. The development of the heart-lung machine was also needed. Lung pioneer James Hardy was prepared to attempt a human heart transplant in 1964, but when a premature failure of comatose Boyd Rush's heart caught Hardy with no human donor, he used a chimpanzee heart, which beat in his patient's chest for approximately one hour and then failed. The first partial success was achieved on 3 December 1967, when Christiaan Barnard of Cape Town, South Africa, performed the world's first human-to-human heart transplant with patient Louis Washkansky as the recipient. Interestingly, a recent study suggests that Denise Darvall, the donor, was not brain-dead and, moreover, her heart was arrested artificially, similarly to a non-voluntary active euthanasia. Washkansky survived for eighteen days amid what many saw as a distasteful publicity circus. The media interest prompted a spate of heart transplants. Over a hundred were performed in 1968–1969, but almost all the people died within 60 days. Barnard's second patient, Philip Blaiberg, lived for 19 months.

It was the advent of cyclosporine that altered transplants from research surgery to life-saving treatment. In 1968 surgical pioneer Denton Cooley performed 17 transplants, including the first heart-lung transplant. Fourteen of his patients were dead within six months. By 1984 two-thirds of all heart transplant patients survived for five years or more. With organ transplants becoming commonplace, limited only by donors, surgeons moved on to riskier fields, including multiple-organ transplants on humans and whole-body transplant research on animals. On 9 March 1981, the first successful heart-lung transplant took place at Stanford University Hospital. The head surgeon, Bruce Reitz, credited the patient's recovery to cyclosporine.

As the rising success rate of transplants and modern immunosuppression make transplants more common, the need for more organs has become critical. Transplants from living donors, especially relatives, have become increasingly common. Additionally, there is substantive research into xenotransplantation, or transgenic organs; although these forms of transplant are not yet being used in humans, clinical trials involving the use of specific cell types have been conducted with promising results, such as using porcine islets of Langerhans to treat type 1 diabetes. However, there are still many problems that would need to be solved before they would be feasible options in people requiring transplants.

Recently, researchers have been looking into means of reducing the general burden of immunosuppression. Common approaches include avoidance of steroids, reduced exposure to calcineurin inhibitors, increased coverance of vaccination for Vaccine-preventable disease and other means of weaning drugs based on patient outcome and function. While short-term outcomes appear promising, long-term outcomes are still unknown, and in general, reduced immunosuppression increases the risk of rejection and decreases the risk of infection. The risk of early rejection is increased if corticosteroid immunosuppression are avoided or withdrawn after renal transplantation.

Many other new drugs are under development for transplantation. The emerging field of regenerative medicine promises to solve the problem of organ transplant rejection by regrowing organs in the lab, using person's own cells (stem cells or healthy cells extracted from the donor site).

=== Timeline of transplants ===
- 1869: First skin autograft-transplantation by Carl Bunger, who documented the first modern successful skin graft on a person. Bunger repaired a person's nose destroyed by syphilis by grafting flesh from the inner thigh to the nose.
- 1905: First successful cornea transplant by Eduard Zirm (Czech Republic)
- 1908: First skin allograft-transplantation of skin from a donor to a recipient (Switzerland)
- 1931: First uterus transplantation (Lili Elbe).
- 1950: First successful kidney transplant by Dr. Richard H. Lawler (Chicago, US)
- 1954: First living related kidney transplant (identical twins) (US)
- 1954: Brazil's first successful corneal transplant, the first liver (Brazil)
- 1955: First heart valve allograft into descending aorta (Canada)
- 1963: First successful lung transplant by James D. Hardy with patient living 18 days (US)
- 1964: James D. Hardy attempts heart transplant using chimpanzee heart (US)
- 1964: Human patient lived nine months with chimpanzee kidneys, twelve other human patients only lived one to two months, Keith Reemtsma and team (New Orleans, US)
- 1965: Spain's first successful kidney transplant at Hospital Clinic de Barcelona, Catalonia, Spain, by a surgeon team led by Josep Maria Gil-Vernet and Antoni Caralps. The patient, a woman, had a very long life since the procedure.
- 1965: Australia's first successful (living) kidney transplant (Queen Elizabeth Hospital, SA, Australia)
- 1966: First successful pancreas transplant by Richard C. Lillehei and William Kelly (Minnesota, US)
- 1967: First successful liver transplant by Thomas Starzl (Denver, US)
- 1967: First successful heart transplant by Christiaan Barnard (Cape Town, South Africa)
- 1978 Use of ciclosporin in clinical renal transplants
- 1981 Use of monoclonal antibodies to lymphocytes in organ grafting
- 1981: First successful heart/lung transplant by Bruce Reitz (Stanford, US)
- 1983: First successful lung lobe transplant by Joel Cooper at the Toronto General Hospital (Toronto, Canada)
- 1984: First successful double organ transplant by Thomas Starzl and Henry T. Bahnson (Pittsburgh, US)
- 1986: First successful double-lung transplant (Ann Harrison) by Joel Cooper at the Toronto General Hospital (Toronto, Canada)
- 1990: First successful adult segmental living-related liver transplant by Mehmet Haberal (Ankara, Turkey)
- 1992: First successful combined living-related liver-kidney transplantation performed by Mehmet Haberal (Ankara, Turkey)
- 1995: First successful laparoscopic live-donor nephrectomy by Lloyd Ratner and Louis Kavoussi (Baltimore, US)
- 1997: First successful allogeneic vascularized transplantation of a fresh and perfused human knee joint by Gunther O. Hofmann
- 1997: Illinois' first living donor kidney-pancreas transplant and first robotic living donor pancreatectomy in the US. University of Illinois Medical Center
- 1998: First successful live-donor partial pancreas transplant by David Sutherland (Minnesota, US)
- 1998: First successful hand transplant by Dr. Jean-Michel Dubernard (Lyon, France)
- 1998: United States' first adult-to-adult living donor liver transplant University of Illinois Medical Center
- 1999: First successful tissue engineered bladder transplanted by Anthony Atala (Boston Children's Hospital, US)
- 2000: First robotic donor nephrectomy for a living-donor kidney transplant in the world University of Illinois Medical Center
- 2004: First liver and small bowel transplants from same living donor into same recipient in the world University of Illinois Medical Center
- 2005: First successful ovarian transplant by Dr. P. N. Mhatre (Wadia Hospital, Mumbai, India)
- 2005: First successful partial face transplant (France)
- 2005: First robotic hepatectomy in the United States University of Illinois Medical Center
- 2006: Illinois' first paired donation for ABO incompatible kidney transplant University of Illinois Medical Center
- 2006: First jaw transplant to combine donor jaw with bone marrow from the patient, by Eric M. Genden (Mount Sinai Hospital, New York City, US)
- 2006: First successful human penis transplant (later reversed after 15 days due to 44-year-old recipient's wife's psychological rejection) (Guangzhou, China)
- 2008: First successful complete full double arm transplant by Edgar Biemer, Christoph Höhnke and Manfred Stangl (Technical University of Munich, Germany)
- 2008: First baby born from transplanted ovary. The transplant was carried out by Dr Sherman Silber at the Infertility Centre of St Louis in Missouri. The donor is her twin sister.
- 2008: First transplant of a human windpipe using a patient's own stem cells, by Paolo Macchiarini (Barcelona, Spain)
- 2008: First successful transplantation of near total area (80%) of face, (including palate, nose, cheeks, and eyelid) by Maria Siemionow (Cleveland Clinic, US)
- 2009: Worlds' first robotic kidney transplant in an obese patient University of Illinois Medical Center
- 2010: First full facial transplant by Dr. Joan Pere Barret and team (Hospital Universitari Vall d'Hebron on 26 July 2010, in Barcelona, Spain)
- 2011: First double leg transplant by Dr. Cavadas and team (Valencia's Hospital, La Fe, Spain)
- 2012: First simultaneous robotic bariatric surgery (sleeve gastrectomy) and kidney transplantation (university of Illinois at Chicago). (1). (2)
- 2012: First Robotic Alloparathyroid transplant. University of Illinois Chicago
- 2013: First successful entire face transplantation as an urgent life-saving surgery at Maria Skłodowska-Curie Institute of Oncology branch in Gliwice, Poland.
- 2014: First successful uterine transplant resulting in live birth (Sweden)
- 2014: First successful penis transplant. (South Africa)
- 2014: First neonatal organ transplant. (UK)
- 2018: The RECELL system (sometimes described in media as 'spray-on skin') received regulatory approval in several jurisdictions and enables clinicians to prepare an autologous cell suspension that may be sprayed onto burns to promote re-epithelialization.
- 2019: First drone delivery of a donated kidney, that was then successfully transplanted into a patient. (US)
- 2021: First transplant of both arms and shoulders performed on an Icelandic patient at the Édouard Herriot Hospital. (FR)
- 2022: First successful heart transplant from a pig to a human patient. (US) The recipient later died as the pig's heart was infected with porcine cytomegalovirus.
- 2023: First main pulmonary artery transplant to extend cancer treatment possibility by Prof. Stefano Cafarotti and team (Ente Ospedaliero Cantonale, Lugano - Switzerland)
- 2025: First human bladder transplant (US)

== Society and culture ==
=== Success rates ===
Since 2000, there have been approximately 2,200 lung transplants performed each year worldwide. From 2000 to 2006, the median survival period for lung transplant patients has been 5.5 years.

=== Comparative costs ===
In China, a kidney transplant operation runs for around $70,000, liver for $160,000, and heart for $120,000.

=== Safety ===
In the United States, tissue transplants are regulated by the Food and Drug Administration (FDA), which enforces stringent safety standards primarily designed to prevent the transmission of communicable diseases. These regulations include detailed criteria for donor screening and testing, as well as strict controls over the processing and distribution of tissue grafts. In contrast, organ transplants are not regulated by the FDA. It is essential that the HLA complexes of both the donor and recipient be as closely matched as possible to prevent graft rejection.

In November 2007, the CDC reported the first-ever case of HIV and Hepatitis C being simultaneously transferred through an organ transplant. The donor was a 38-year-old male classified as "high-risk" by donation organizations, whose organs transmitted HIV and Hepatitis C to four recipients. Experts suggest that the infections went undetected in screening tests because the donor likely contracted the diseases within three weeks prior to death, a period during which antibody levels are too low for detection. This incident has prompted calls for more sensitive screening methods capable of identifying antibodies earlier. Currently, standard tests cannot reliably detect the small number of antibodies produced in HIV infections within the first 90 days, or Hepatitis C infections within 18–21 days before organ donation.

Nucleic acid testing is now being done by many organ procurement organizations and is able to detect HIV and hepatitis C directly within seven to ten days of exposure to the virus.

=== Transplant laws ===
Both developing and developed countries have forged various policies to try to increase the safety and availability of organ transplants to their citizens. However, whilst potential recipients in developing countries may mirror their more developed counterparts in desperation, potential donors in developing countries do not. The Indian government has had difficulty tracking the flourishing organ black market in their country, but in recent times it has amended its organ transplant law to make punishment more stringent for commercial dealings in organs. It has also included new clauses in the law to support deceased organ donation, such as making it mandatory to request for organ donation in case of brain death. Other countries victimized by illegal organ trade have also implemented legislative reactions. Moldova has made international adoption illegal in fear of organ traffickers. China has made selling of organs illegal as of July 2006 and claims that all prisoner organ donors have filed consent. However, doctors in other countries, such as the United Kingdom, have accused China of abusing its high capital punishment rate. Despite these efforts, illegal organ trafficking continues to thrive and can be attributed to corruption in healthcare systems, which has been traced as high up as the doctors themselves in China and Ukraine, and the blind eye economically strained governments and health care programs must sometimes turn to organ trafficking. Some organs are also shipped to Uganda and the Netherlands. This was a main product in the triangular trade in 1934.

Starting on 1 May 2007, doctors involved in commercial trade of organs will face fines and suspensions in China. Only a few certified hospitals will be allowed to perform organ transplants in order to curb illegal transplants. Harvesting organs without donor's consent was also deemed a crime.

On 27 June 2008, Indonesian, Sulaiman Damanik, 26, pleaded guilty in Singapore court for sale of his kidney to CK Tang's executive chair, Tang Wee Sung, 55, for 150 million rupiah (S$22,200). The Transplant Ethics Committee must approve living donor kidney transplants. Organ trading is banned in Singapore and in many other countries to prevent the exploitation of "poor and socially disadvantaged donors who are unable to make informed choices and suffer potential medical risks." Toni, 27, the other accused, donated a kidney to an Indonesian patient in March, alleging he was the patient's adopted son, and was paid 186 million rupiah (US$20,200). Upon sentence, both would suffer each, 12 months in jail or 10,000 Singapore dollars (US$7,600) fine.

In an article appearing in the April 2004 issue of Econ Journal Watch, economist Alex Tabarrok examined the impact of direct consent laws on transplant organ availability. Tabarrok found that social pressures resisting the use of transplant organs decreased over time as the opportunity of individual decisions increased. Tabarrok concluded his study suggesting that gradual elimination of organ donation restrictions and move to a free market in organ sales will increase supply of organs and encourage broader social acceptance of organ donation as a practice.

In the United States 24 states have no law preventing discrimination against potential organ recipients based on cognitive ability, including children. A 2008 study found that of the transplant centers surveyed in those states 85 percent considered disability when deciding transplant list and forty four percent would deny an organ transplant to a child with a neurodevelopmental disability.

=== Ethical concerns ===
The existence and distribution of organ transplantation procedures in developing countries, while almost always beneficial to those receiving them, raise many ethical concerns. Both the source and method of obtaining the organ to transplant are major ethical issues to consider, as well as the notion of distributive justice. The World Health Organization argues that transplantations promote health, but the notion of "transplantation tourism" has the potential to violate human rights or exploit the poor, to have unintended health consequences, and to provide unequal access to services, all of which ultimately may cause harm. Regardless of the "gift of life", in the context of developing countries, this might be coercive. The practice of coercion could be considered exploitative of the poor population, violating basic human rights according to Articles 3 and 4 of the Universal Declaration of Human Rights. There is also a powerful opposing view, that trade in organs, if properly and effectively regulated to ensure that the seller is fully informed of all the consequences of donation, is a mutually beneficial transaction between two consenting adults, and that prohibiting it would itself be a violation of Articles 3 and 29 of the Universal Declaration of Human Rights.

Even within developed countries there is concern that enthusiasm for increasing the supply of organs may trample on respect for the right to life. The question is made even more complicated by the fact that the "irreversibility" criterion for legal death cannot be adequately defined and can easily change with changing technology. U.S. reforms post-2022 aim to eliminate inequities in the organ transplantation system through evidence-based interventions.

=== Artificial organ transplantation ===
Surgeons, notably Paolo Macchiarini, in Sweden performed the first implantation of a synthetic trachea in July 2011, for a 36-year-old patient who had cancer. Stem cells taken from the patient's hip were treated with growth factors and incubated on a plastic replica of his natural trachea.

According to information revealed by the Swedish documentary Dokument Inifrån: Experimenten ("Documents from the Inside: The Experiments"), the patient Andemariam developed a progressively worsening and ultimately bloody cough while hospitalized. An autopsy later determined that 90% of his synthetic windpipe had detached. Reports indicate that Andemariam made several attempts to consult with Dr. Macchiarini regarding his complications and even underwent surgery intended to replace the synthetic windpipe. However, Macchiarini was reportedly difficult to access for appointments, and the autopsy suggested that the old synthetic windpipe had not actually been replaced.

Macchiarini's academic credentials have been called into question and he has recently been accused of alleged research misconduct.

Left ventricular assist devices (LVADs) are frequently used as a "bridge" to extend the survival of patients awaiting a heart transplant. For example, former U.S. Vice President Dick Cheney had an LVAD implanted in 2010 and received a heart transplant 20 months later, in 2012. In that same year, approximately 3,000 ventricular assist devices were implanted in the United States, compared to around 2,500 heart transplants. Additionally, safety measures such as the widespread use of airbags in vehicles and increased helmet use among bicyclists and skiers have contributed to a reduction in fatal head injuries, a common source of donor hearts.

== Research ==
An early-stage medical laboratory and research company, called Organovo, designs and develops functional, three dimensional human tissue for medical research and therapeutic applications. The company utilizes its NovoGen MMX Bioprinter for 3D bioprinting. Organovo anticipates that the bioprinting of human tissues will accelerate the preclinical drug testing and discovery process, enabling treatments to be created more quickly and at lower cost. Additionally, Organovo has long-term expectations that this technology could be suitable for surgical therapy and transplantation.

An active area of research focuses on improving and evaluating organs during preservation. Several promising techniques have been developed, most involving perfusion of the organ under either hypothermic (4–10 °C) or normothermic (37 °C) conditions. Although these methods increase the cost and logistical complexity of organ retrieval, preservation, and transplantation, early results indicate significant benefits. Hypothermic perfusion is currently used clinically for kidney and liver transplants, while normothermic perfusion has been effectively applied in heart, lung, and liver transplants, and to a lesser extent, in kidney transplantation.

Another area of ongoing research to address donor shortages involves the use of genetically engineered animals as potential organ donors and inducing immune tolerance to reduce rejection. Scientists have developed genetically modified pigs designed to reduce the risk of organ rejection when transplanted into human patients. Although this research remains in the early stages, it holds significant promise for addressing the shortage of donor organs and the growing number of patients on transplant waiting lists. Clinical trials are currently being delayed until concerns about the potential transmission of diseases from pigs to humans can be thoroughly addressed and managed safely (Isola & Gordon, 1991).

== Negative effects of transplantation ==
In 2021, the National Academies of Sciences, Engineering, and Medicine published a report titled Exploring the State of the Science of Solid Organ Transplantation and Disability which discussed quality of life after transplantation. In the chapter about pediatric transplantation, Nitika Gupta, Eyal Shemesh, George Mazariegos, Dorry Segev, and other researchers discuss outcomes in young transplant recipients. Pediatric intestine transplant recipients have poor long-term outcomes with 15% requiring retransplant within 5 years of receiving their first transplant and 40-60% experiencing transplant failure after 10 years.

Pediatric transplant recipients frequently have mental and behavioral problems. As many as one in three adolescent transplant recipients are nonadherenant to their medication regimens. Adolescent kidney recipients are more likely to be diagnosed with mental disorders such as depression and anxiety following transplantation, living with their parents and experiencing unemployment as adults, and having poor grades in school. They were also more likely to commit suicide and abuse substances. Dr. Clifford Chin explains his opinion that rather than being a cure, heart transplantation creates a chronic illness with a plethora of adverse side effects, such as developmental delay, limited ability to participate in everyday activities, and impaired cognitive function, which may suggest an arrested development, but hepatologist Saeed Mohammad later explains how lack of proper oxygen levels may effect intellectual ability following the transplant.

Saeed Mohammad also discussed the correlation between developmental milestones and pediatric transplantation in general. He considers pediatric transplant recipients to be chronically ill, even though the transplants cured their illnesses. He explains how children who had received transplants are often underestimated, but also points out that immunosuppressive therapy can affect brain development.

Patients who had received liver transplants between the ages of eleven and seventeen had lower survival rates than compared to those who had received liver transplants when they were under five years old, especially if they had their transplant between the ages of sixteen and seventeen. Nitika Gupta, a pediatric hepatologist, points out that teenagers' brains are still forming and developing, which can have critical effects on patients.

It should be pointed out that the researchers refer to pediatric transplant recipients as chronically ill, special needs, and affected by chronic health conditions, though transplantation is a medical operation, rather than a diagnosable condition.

In young liver transplant recipients, nonadherence was more common in girls, patients living in single-parent homes, and patients nineteen and older.

== See also ==
- Allotransplantation
- Artificial organ
- Beating heart cadaver
- Blood transfusion
- Laboratory-grown organ
- Organ donation
- Regenerative medicine
- Transplant rejection
- Xenotransplantation
- Microchimerism
- Mitochondrial replacement therapy

Others

- Grafting
- List of organ transplant donors and recipients
- Transplantable organs and tissues
