= Death of Jesica Santillan =

2003 medical malpractice death

Jesica Santillan
- Born: December 26, 1985; Tamazula, Jalisco, Mexico
- Died: February 22, 2003 (aged 17); Durham, North Carolina, U.S.
- Known for: Victim of a medical error during heart-lung transplant

Jesica Santillan (December 26, 1985 – February 22, 2003) was a Mexican national who died after an organ transplant operation in which she received the heart and lungs of a patient whose blood type did not match hers. The medical error occurred due to a misunderstanding about blood type compatibility between the surgeon at the Duke University Medical Center and the organ transplant agency Carolina Donor Services (CDS) and United Network for Organ Sharing (UNOS). The error was identified near the completion of the surgery.

== Background ==
Jesica, two siblings, her mother Magdelena Santillan and her mother's boyfriend Melecio Huerta illegally entered the United States from Tamazula, Mexico, a town 275 miles (443 km) west of Mexico City, so that she could receive medical treatment. Relatives have stated that the family paid a coyote to get them across the border. During the journey, thieves stole all of the family's money, including Jesica's earrings. The family settled in Durham, North Carolina near Duke University Hospital and successfully raised money for the transplant operation with the help of Mack Mahoney, a local businessman.

In January 2002, the patient was listed with the UNOS for a heart transplant. However, subsequent medical evaluations led to an updated listing for a combined heart-lung transplantation in May 2002. Santillan experienced progressive symptoms, including frequent syncopal episodes upon exertion.

== Operation ==
Jesica, whose blood type was O-positive, had a congenital heart condition (restrictive cardiomyopathy and secondary nonreactive pulmonary hypertension) that resulted in reduced blood perfusion in her lungs. On February 7, 2003, she received the heart and lung transplant at Duke University Hospital. The new organs had been flown in from Boston. James Jaggers, Santillan's transplant surgeon, was informed by Duke's Clinical Transplant Immunology Laboratory that blood test results proving that the organ blood type (type A) and Jesica's blood type (O-Positive) did not match just as the surgery was ending.

The procedures that should have prevented such a mistake broke down twice: Jaggers failed to check the compatibility, assuming that the blood type of the donated organs matched Jesica's. He also failed to verbally confirm that assumption with Carolina Donor Services, the donor agency.

Upon discovery of the medical error, the transplant team administered high-dose immunosuppressant drugs and plasmapheresis to prevent immediate organ rejection, which would cause the antibodies in the blood to attack and destroy the new organs. After the operation, the patient was kept on life support with mechanical ventilation in the pediatric intensive care unit while a donor for a second transplant was sought.

While there was a brief moment where she reportedly squeezed her mother’s hand and wiggled her feet in response to voices, she remained in a comatose state and never recovered full consciousness following her first transplant surgery.

Her immune system, detecting incompatible proteins from the mismatched donor organs, initiated a severe rejection response, attacking the transplanted organs and leading to further complications. Jesica experienced a heart attack on February 10 and a seizure on February 16. On February 10, Santillan's lung function deteriorated and mechanical ventilation was replaced with extracorporeal membrane oxygenation (ECMO).

She also suffered from acute kidney failure on February 18 as a result of the mismatch and being on life support machines for longer periods, resulting in a need for dialysis.

=== Second transplant ===
On February 19, 2003, a head CT scan was performed, which showed no evidence of irreversible brain damage at that time. Later that day, a suitable donor was identified, and in the early hours of February 20, Jesica underwent a second transplant, receiving a new heart and lungs.

The surgery began at 6:00 a.m. and was completed by 10:15 a.m. Jesica was transferred to the pediatric intensive care unit (PICU) off extracorporeal membrane oxygenation (ECMO) but remained on mechanical ventilation. Initial post-operative evaluations indicated that her new heart and lungs were functioning adequately, with no immediate changes to her neurological status.

However, by 2:00 a.m. on February 21, her condition deteriorated rapidly while being in a vegetative state. A CT scan revealed severe brain swelling, herniation and bleeding, a catheter was inserted to drain the cerebrospinal fluid and measure the intracranial pressure. Subsequent tests—including an electroencephalogram (EEG), apnea test and cerebral perfusion scan—confirmed the absence of brain activity.

By 1:25 p.m. on February 22, after two separate neurological exams, Jesica was declared brain dead.

Her family was approached by the hospital to determine if her salvageable organs could be donated for use in other transplant patients. On the advice of their attorneys, the family declined. Life support was maintained until 5:00 p.m. to allow loved ones to say goodbye. After cardiac medications were discontinued, her heart stopped at 5:07 p.m., and ventilator support was withdrawn three minutes later. Jesica was 17 years old at the time of her death.

== Aftermath ==
Subsequently, Mahoney, Jesica's benefactor, had to fight the hospital to get it to admit to the mistake, and according to him Duke officials misled the Santillans, who barely spoke English, about the gravity of Jesica's situation.

The autopsy performed on February 24 revealed that Jesica Santillan died due to a severe brain injury caused by complications from her first heart-lung transplant. Dr. John Butts, the chief North Carolina medical examiner, stated in the autopsy report:

Given the historical circumstances and the autopsy findings, it is my opinion that this young woman’s death was the result of global cerebral hypoxic injury that was a complication of the rejection of an ... incompatible heart-lung transplant

In 2004, Duke University Medical Center settled with the Santillan family.

== Jesica's Hope Chest ==
Jesica's Hope Chest (JHC) was a charity that Mack Mahoney named after her. It received donations for houses which then go to families who have at least one heart patient. Ten years after Santillan's death, allegations surfaced that money for the charity was being misappropriated.

== See also ==
- Hyperacute rejection
- ABO-incompatible transplantation
- Sarah Murnaghan lung transplant controversy
