= Susan Murray (disambiguation) =

Susan Murray may refer to:

- Susan Murray (born 1957), British politician, MP for Mid Dunbartonshire
- Susan Murray (biostatistician), American professor of biostatistics, developed lung allocation score used to prioritize transplants
- Susan Murray (historian), American professor of history, specializes in television studies
