= Susan Murray (biostatistician) =

American biostatistician

Susan Murray is an American biostatistician, and a professor in the Department of Biostatistics in the University of Michigan School of Public Health. She is an expert in survival analysis and the biostatistics of respiratory disease, and is known for developing the lung allocation score used from 2005 to 2023 to determine how to prioritize recipients of lung transplantation operations.

== Education and career ==
Murray has a triple bachelor's degree in English, statistics and mathematical sciences, from Rice University in 1990. She continued her studies in biostatistics at Harvard University, where she received a master's degree in 1992 and completed a doctorate (Sc.D.) in 1994, supervised by Anastasios (Butch) Tsiatis.

From 1994 to 1996 she was a postdoctoral researcher at Harvard and the Dana–Farber Cancer Institute. She joined the University of Michigan as an assistant professor in 1996, was tenured as an associate professor in 2002, and was promoted to full professor in 2010. From 2001 to 2010 she also worked as a senior biostatistician for the Scientific Registry of Transplant Recipients; it was in this work that she developed the lung allocation score. In 2017 she added an affiliation as adjunct professor of internal medicine in the Division of Pulmonary and Critical Care Medicine of the University of Michigan Health System.

== Recognition ==
Murray was elected as a Fellow of the American Statistical Association in 2026.
