= Sarah Murnaghan lung transplant controversy =

American legal controversy on child organ-transplant triage

Sarah Murnaghan
- Born: 2002 (age 23–24); Philadelphia, Pennsylvania, U.S.
- Known for: Lung transplant controversy

In late May 2013, the parents of a ten-year-old Philadelphia area girl with cystic fibrosis, Sarah Murnaghan, launched a campaign to change the under-12 policy of the United Network for Organ Sharing (UNOS), which they asserted was age discrimination.

== Background ==
The system organizing lung transplants in the United States was overhauled in 2004 and again in 2008. The system gives those over the age of twelve a lung allocation score (LAS), which is used to prioritize patients for transplant based partially on the urgency of their need. However, children under twelve are granted lungs on a first-come, first-served basis. In addition, there are far fewer donor lungs available for children under the age of twelve than there are for adults – between 10 and 20 as opposed to 1,700 in a given year.

Murnaghan's parents argued that she needed a lung transplant or else she would die in a matter of weeks but that this was not possible because existing rules give higher priority for adult donor lungs to children who are at least twelve years old. Her parents argued that, although she only had a few weeks to live, under current UNOS transplant policy did not qualify for adult donor lungs although it is now possible to downsize adult lungs for transplantation into children.

Kathleen Sebelius, then the United States secretary of health and human services, refused to grant an exception to the rule. In response to Sebelius's argument that a review of the policies would need to take place before the rule could be changed, congressman Tom Price argued that such a process would take an entire year to complete and that the girl would be dead by that time. At the time of her transplant in June 2013, Murnaghan had been waiting on the transplant list for about eighteen months.

== Health conditions ==
Because of the side effects of antibiotics she had to take to treat her cystic fibrosis, Murnaghan developed permanent hearing loss. She also has osteoporosis and cystic fibrosis-related diabetes.

== Controversy ==
While the family portrayed their daughter's case as one of bureaucracy getting in the way of lung transplantation that should have been (and later was) awarded based on her extreme necessity and limited time left to live should she not obtain the transplant, some bioethicists questioned this depiction. For example, Arthur Caplan said, "In general, the road to a transplant is still to let the system decide who will do best with scarce, lifesaving organs."

He explained that children do not get put on the adult lung transplant list because "adult lungs rarely fit, so you have to use only a part of one. Using only a lobe from an adult cadaver donor negatively impacts the chance of survival."

Similarly, Stuart Sweet of the lung transplant program at St. Louis Children's Hospital contended, "the issue here is really about how we designed this system to try to make it fair for everyone waiting for lungs. There are ways of working through this that don't involve breaking the rules."

=== The New England Journal of Medicine ===
This controversy came to a head on July 24, 2013, when a perspective piece was published in The New England Journal of Medicine regarding the debate over under-12 allocation rules. The piece, written by Karen Ladin and Douglas Hanto, noted that

"...as a treatment for cystic fibrosis (the most common diagnosis among pediatric candidates for lung transplants), transplantation has been shown in several retrospective studies to have only marginal benefit (although some data suggest otherwise)."

However, they also pointed out that a valid argument exists for those who wish to change the rules, specifically:

"Younger patients who meet the size requirements and could benefit from adult lungs should be considered eligible."

=== Chest ===
A study published in the Chest, noted that high lung allocation score (above 75) is associated with increased morbidity and mortality following transplantation. Murnaghan had a lung allocation score of 91 out of 100 upon her first transplant. Her second lung allocation score was 87 out of 100.

=== American Journal of Transplantation ===
An article posted in the American Journal of Transplantation authored by Dr. Sweet and Dr. Barr in December 2013 discussed points brought up by the Murnaghan family. First they stated,

"Indeed, the pool of adult transplant candidates is more than 50 times larger than the number of pediatric candidates. So the actual number of lungs recovered from donors under 12 reflects both donor availability and candidate demand. In fact, roughly 5% of the 400+ donors each year under 12 provide lungs compared to more than 35% of the 400+ adolescent donors (Figure 1). It is unlikely that donor characteristics are solely responsible for the lower percentage. Thus one area of focus for the pediatric lung transplant community should be to explore tapping into this apparent opportunity."

They also stated,

"The second concept propagated by this story is that lobar transplant from adult donors is the best solution to the (perceived) lack of lung donors for children under 12. Although this option may be appropriate for children in circumstances where experienced transplant surgeons and physicians counsel the family that waiting for suitably sized donor organs from a pediatric donor is not feasible, the reality is that there are limited data supporting this approach for young children (in the most widely referenced series, the youngest recipient of an adult deceased donor lobar transplant was 9 years old). Moreover, the authors' experience with living donor lobar transplant suggests that size matching is critical to successful outcome. Thus, a change to the allocation system that encourages increased use of lobar transplant for young children would be premature."

=== Annals of Internal Medicine ===
In the September 3, 2013 issue of the Annals of Internal Medicine, bioethicist Scott Halpern wrote the following regarding the decision to give Murnaghan receiving an adult lung as a result of Judge Michael Baylson's restraining order against the DHHS:

"This intervention sets a troubling precedent. The court did not seek evidence to assess the merit of the age-discrimination claim...The rule undoubtedly disadvantaged Murnaghan, but the court's response exalted her and another child above a national policy, suggesting either failure to recognize that preferential treatment for some recipients will adversely affect others (who may not be much older than 12) or that the court considered these 2 children's lives more valuable than others'. Neither of these explanations is satisfying."

=== Pediatrics ===
In 2014, Pediatrics asked multiple bioethicists if they thought Judge Baylson made the right decision to override the UNOS allocation system give Murnaghan access to adult lungs. Two bioethicists, Jennifer DeSante and Arthur Caplan, told the journal that

"In the Murnaghan case, Judge Baylson claimed that the UNOS pediatric lung allocation policy was "arbitrary", capricious, and based on inadequate evidence...What the judge saw as arbitrary, UNOS experts saw as a policy reflective of the inadequate evidence concerning transplants for children versus adequate evidence supporting the efficacy of adult lung transplants."

== Ruling ==
On June 5, 2013, Judge Michael Baylson of the Eastern District of Pennsylvania District Court directed Kathleen Sebelius to temporarily suspend the under-12 rule following an emergency hearing. Judge Baylson stated in a memo regarding the issue of the temporary restraining order that,

"issuance of the TRO was very much in the interest of the public as well as the Plaintiffs and Sarah ... [F]inally, this Court did not in any way, shape, or form dictate when or whether Murnaghan should receive a lung transplant."

The Organ Procurement and Transplantation Network (OPTN) responded by making a temporary, one-year appeals process for children under the age of 12 whose doctors feel they may benefit from adult lungs. This temporary appeals process expired on June 30, 2014.

== Transplants ==
On June 12, 2013, Murnaghan underwent what would be the first of two double lung transplants. She received these lungs from an adult donor. In a statement immediately following the surgery, her family said, "The surgeons had no challenges resizing and transplanting the donor lungs – the surgery went smoothly, and Sarah did extremely well."

This first pair of lungs, however, failed within hours of completion of the operation, necessitating the transplantation of a second pair of adult lungs on June 15, 2013. Murnaghan was placed on an extracorporeal membrane oxygenation (ECMO) machine on June 12, 2013, until her second transplant on June 15, 2013.

According to the Associated Press, the second set of lungs were infected with pneumonia, but the girl's condition was too dire to wait for another set of lungs to become available. Surgeons were able to remove the infected portion before the transplant. After the transplant, Murnaghan was able to take a few breaths on her own after doctors removed her breathing tube. However, she quickly needed breathing assistance, and the tube was reinserted. It was later discovered that her diaphragm had become paralyzed.

== Complications ==
After her second transplant, Murnaghan developed pneumonia in her right lung.

ABC News reported that "A healthier patient might have turned down the lungs and waited for a better pair, but Sarah was out of options, so they went ahead with the operation." She needed a diaphragm plication (folding and suturing to tighten the diaphragm) and a Nissen fundoplication.

== Departure from hospital ==
On August 27, 2013, Murnaghan returned home from Children's Hospital of Philadelphia, where she had been staying since February 19.

She is undergoing physical therapy at home as part of her recovery and continues to struggle with compression fractures in her spine. However, according to her mother, Murnaghan is able to breathe off the ventilator for twelve hours a day.

As of 2018, Sarah Murnaghan has diabetes, cystic fibrosis and ongoing hearing loss.

== See also ==
- Jesica Santillan
