= End stage pulmonary disease =

- Other names: End stage lung disease (ESLD)
- Specialty: Pulmonology

End stage pulmonary disease (ESPD) is the result of chronic progressive lung diseases like COPD, idiopathic pulmonary fibrosis, or systemic progressive diseases that affect the lungs such as cystic fibrosis or granulomatosis with polyangiitis. It is defined as when the lungs can no longer or barely remove enough carbon dioxide or supply enough oxygen to meet the body's basic needs. Treatment incorporates a lung transplant.
