= Scott Halpern =

American doctor and researcher

Scott D. Halpern
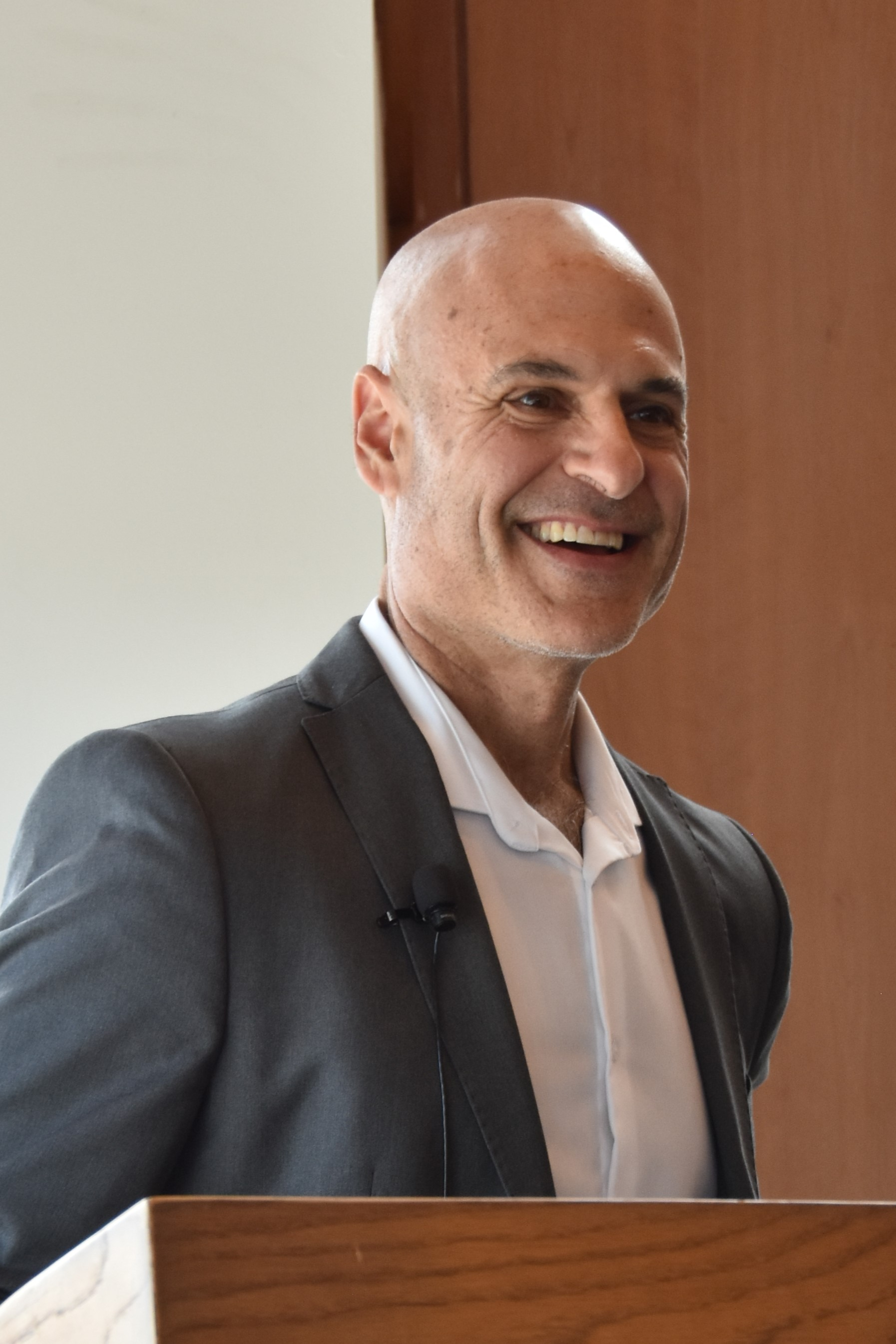
- Spouse(s): Analisa V. Halpern, MD (m. 2003)

Academic background
- Education: BS, Psychology and Economics, 1991, Duke University; MS, Clinical Epidemiology, 2001; MBe (Bioethics), 2002; PhD, Epidemiology, 2002, MD, 2003, University of Pennsylvania

Academic work
- Institutions: Perelman School of Medicine

Scott D. Halpern is an American critical care and palliative care physician at Penn Medicine, and the John M. Eisenberg Professor in Medicine and Professor of Epidemiology and of Medical Ethics and Health Policy at the University of Pennsylvania’s Perelman School of Medicine. He is also the Founding Director of the Palliative and Advanced Illness Research (PAIR) Center at the University of Pennsylvania (Penn). In 2024, Halpern was elected to the National Academy of Medicine for his research examining ways to improve care for seriously ill patients and their families.

== Early life and education ==
Halpern grew up in Springfield, NJ, and graduated from the Pingry School in 1991, where he was a 3-sport varsity athlete. He earned his Bachelor of Science in Psychology and Economics from Duke University in 1995, where he was also the Health and Science Editor of The Chronicle. In 2003, he became the first student to earn a combined MD/PhD in Epidemiology from Penn, also earning a Master of Bioethics (MBe) during this time. Halpern completed clinical training at the Hospital of the University of Pennsylvania (HUP) in Internal Medicine, Critical Care Medicine, and Palliative Medicine.

== Early research career ==
Halpern’s Ph.D. Dissertation in Epidemiology and Biostatistics focused on the design and ethics of randomized clinical trials and earned Penn’s Saul Winegrad Award for outstanding dissertation. Much of his scholarship as a post-doctoral fellow and junior faculty member focused on ways to improve the supply and allocation of transplantable organs. He penned analyses of controversial transplant practices, including specific cases such as the Sarah Murnaghan lung transplant controversy.

Extending the theme of how best to allocate scarce health care resources, Halpern next developed the construct of and coined the term “ICU capacity strain”—i.e., the causes and consequences of limits on a hospital unit’s ability to deliver high-quality care to all patients who could benefit from it at a given time. The construct has been adopted by investigators around the world to understand how care changes when ICUs and hospitals get busy. Additional work from Halpern’s research group showed that ICU readmission rates are not attributable to the quality of ICU care, contributing to Medicare’s decision to abandon its plan to develop ICU readmission rate as a quality measure.

In 2011, Halpern was named the Deputy Director of the Center for Health Incentives and Behavioral Economics (CHIBE) at Penn, led by Kevin Volpp, applying behavioral economic principles to some of the most pressing challenges in preventive health care. With Volpp, Halpern conducted some of the largest trials ever in the field of smoking cessation.

Motivated by the premature death of his father, Richard Halpern, in 2009, Halpern in 2012 founded the Fostering Improvement in End-of-Life Decision Science (FIELDS) program, the nation’s first program specifically applying behavioral economic principles to the delivery of end-of-life care for seriously ill patients. Halpern's scholarship through the FIELDS program was recognized that same year when the Robert Wood Johnson Foundation selected him and 9 others to receive its inaugural Young Leader Award, given to "leaders ages 40 and under for their exceptional contributions to improving the health of the nation." In addition to empirical work demonstrating that the ways in which end-of-life decisions are framed heavily influence the choices seriously ill patients make, Halpern has addressed the foundational ethical issues raised by “nudging” patients’ healthcare choices.

Halpern has challenged the serious illness care field to apply the same level of analytic rigor to studying interventions as is required for new-drug development. He is also known for prominent analyses of other critical topics in end-of-life care, including advance directives and physician orders for life-sustaining therapy, goal-concordant care, medical aid in dying, and health states patients consider worse than death.

== Subsequent research ==
In 2017, Halpern established the Palliative and Advanced Illness Research (PAIR) Center. The mission of the PAIR Center is to “generate high-quality evidence to advance healthcare policies and practices with the goals of improving the lives of all people affected by serious illness and removing the barriers to health equity that seriously ill patients commonly face.”

Within the PAIR Center, Halpern and his team have studied how patients and clinicians communicate and make decisions around serious illness care, including how they predict future outcomes. His team conducts clinical trials testing scalable interventions to improve care, including conducting some of the largest trials ever in the field of palliative care delivery.

Additionally, Halpern works to promote fairness in clinical care delivery and reduce bias in clinical prediction models. He also works to improve the representativeness of clinical trials through the Behavioral Economics to Transform Trial Enrollment Representativeness Center, which Halpern founded in 2022 with funding from the American Heart Association’s strategically focused research network on the science of diversity in clinical trials.

During the COVID-19 pandemic, Halpern was also featured by news outlets across the country for his clinical work in ICUs, scholarship on the supply and allocation of beds and ventilators, and his contributions to ethics guidelines for the allocation of such resources that were adopted by hospitals across Pennsylvania.

== Mentorship ==
Halpern serves as the Principal Investigator of the nation’s only training grant in Critical Care Health Policy Research (T32HL098054) and is the recipient of an NIH Midcareer Investigator Award in Patient-Oriented Research (K24HL143289), which provides dedicated time to support his mentorship. In addition to training postdoctoral fellows and early-career faculty, Halpern has mentored medical, graduate, and undergraduate students for more than 15 years. He has been recognized with the John Hansen-Flaschen Award for Outstanding Mentorship and the Arthur K. Asbury Outstanding Faculty Mentor Award from the University of Pennsylvania.

== Awards and honors ==
- 2024 Elected Member of the National Academy of Medicine
- 2025 J. Randall Curtis Humanism Award, American Thoracic Society
