= Joel D. Cooper =

American surgeon

Joel D. Cooper, FACS, is a thoracic surgeon known for having completed the first successful lung transplant and the first successful double lung transplant.

== Career ==
Cooper graduated from Harvard Medical School in 1964, completed his fellowship, and then obtained his first faculty appointment in 1972 at the University of Toronto. He performed the world's first successful lung transplant on pulmonary fibrosis patient Tom Hall on November 7, 1983 at Toronto General Hospital. He performed the world's first successful double lung transplant on emphysema patient Ann Harrison in 1986 at the same hospital. In 1988 he moved to Washington University School of Medicine, and then in 2005 to the Perelman School of Medicine at the University of Pennsylvania. He was the head of thoracic surgery at Washington University. He is currently Emeritus Professor of Surgery in the Division of Thoracic Surgery at the University of Pennsylvania. He was past president of the American Association for Thoracic Surgery, a member of the Institute of Medicine of the National Academy of Sciences, and the recipient of numerous honorary degrees.

== Interests ==
Special interests include areas in general thoracic, esophageal & tracheal surgery, adult lung transplantation, lung-volume reduction surgery, surgical treatment of lung cancer, and swallowing disorders.

== Early education ==
When Cooper was a child, he had many signs which proved he was interested in medicine, one of which was when he went fishing with his dad and he took all the guts out the fish and watched the fishes heart beat on the side of the table which is when he has the idea of becoming a surgeon in his head. After his residency, he went to England where he served as a Senior Registrar in the Thoracic surgery at the Frenchay Hospital in Bristal with Ronald Belsey for 6 months. After England, Cooper completed his thoracic training at the Massachusetts General Hospital.

=== Experiments/medical terms ===
A thoracic surgeon is a specialty that focuses on treating diseases that are in the lungs, chest, esophagus, and partially the heart. Thoracic surgeons’ main purpose is to treat patients that have problems with their lungs, specifically cancer. People who have pulmonary hypertension are usually the people who must undergo lung transplant surgery. Cooper had to test lung transplants on animals for a long time before performing on humans. With the help of some of his coworkers and researchers, they began many experiments, one of which included dogs that were given an overload of a drug called in immunosuppressant which interfered with the healing process. He was a surgeon in Philadelphia and worked in many hospitals around that area.

=== Accomplishments and achievements ===
Cooper had many accomplishments but struggled to become a thoracic surgeon. Throughout the U.S. there are about 1,754 lung transplants done every year, thanks to Cooper who is a thoracic surgeon. Cooper has been practicing medicine for over 20 years. He performed the world's first successful lung transplant on pulmonary fibrosis patient Tom Hall on November 7, 1983, at Toronto General Hospital. During the lung transplant research, he worked with Alec Patterson as well as others. Before the 1st lung transplant was successful, in 1978 there had been about 38 attempted lung transplants in the world which had all failed. Because of all the failed lung transplants, Cooper decided to start looking for causes of failed lung transplants, one of which was poor blood supply. Although Cooper accomplished many things, he always gave other doctor's credit when talking about the first ever transplant.
