= Toronto General Hospital =

Hospital in Toronto, Ontario, Canada

Coordinates: 43.658977°N 79.388505°W

- University Health Network

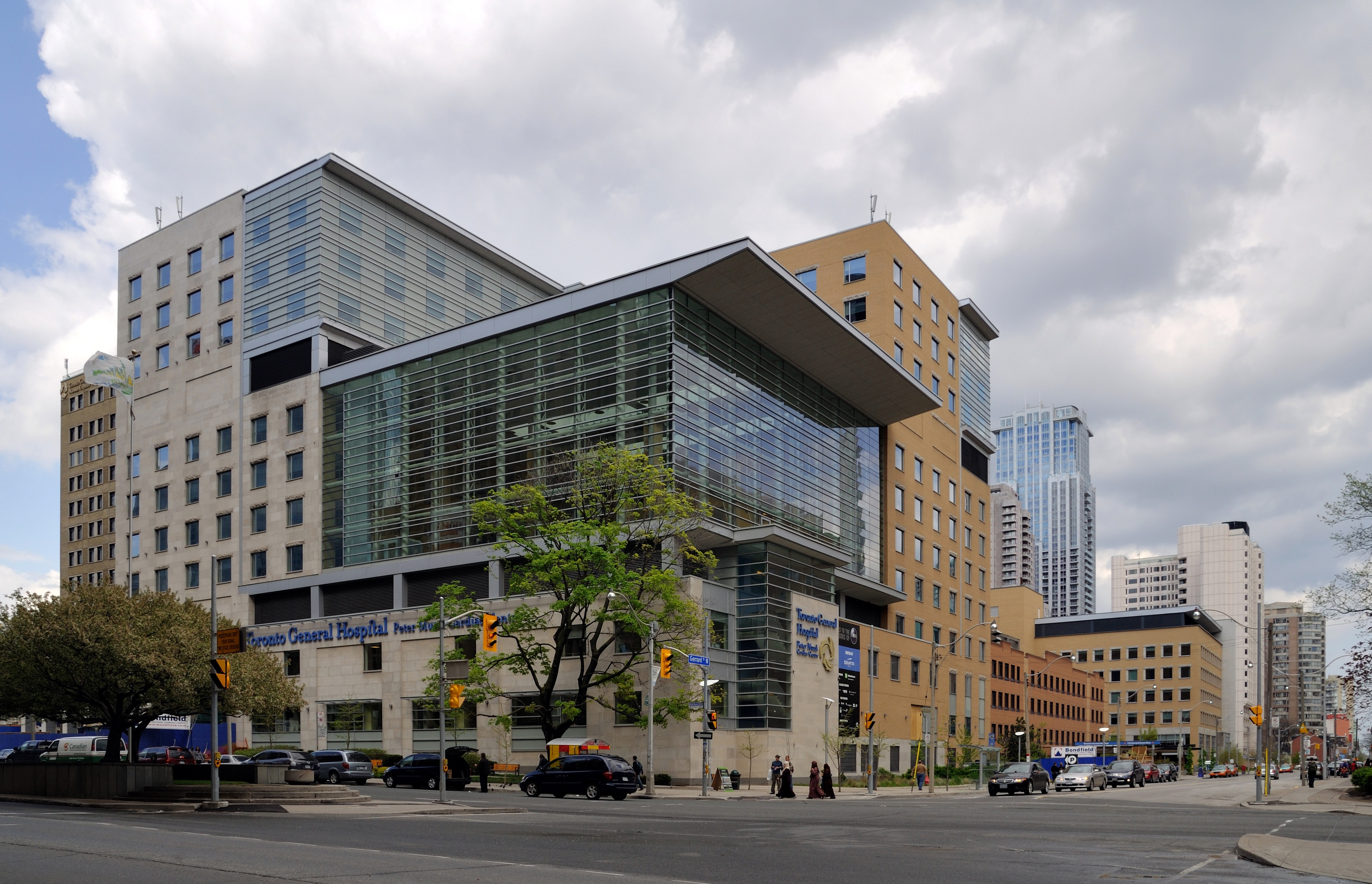

Geography
- Location: 200 Elizabeth Street; Toronto, Ontario; M5G 2C4

Organisation
- Care system: Medicare
- Type: Teaching
- Affiliated university: University of Toronto
- Patron: Sophie, Duchess of Edinburgh

Services
- Emergency department: Yes
- Beds: 471
- Speciality: Cardiology and Transplantation

History
- Founded: 1812

Links
- Website: www.uhn.ca/OurHospitals/TGH

The Toronto General Hospital (TGH) is a major teaching hospital in Toronto, Ontario, Canada, and the flagship campus of University Health Network (UHN). It is located in the Discovery District of Downtown Toronto along University Avenue's Hospital Row; it is directly north of The Hospital for Sick Children, across Gerrard Street West, and east of Princess Margaret Cancer Centre and Mount Sinai Hospital. The hospital serves as a teaching hospital for the University of Toronto Faculty of Medicine. In 2019, the hospital was ranked first for research in Canada by Research Infosource for the ninth consecutive year.

The emergency department now treats 28,065 persons each year, while the hospital also houses the major transplantation service for Ontario, performing heart, lung, kidney, liver, pancreas, and small intestine, amongst others, for patients referred from all over Canada. The hospital is the largest organ transplant center in North America, performing 639 transplants in 2017. The hospital is also renowned for cardiac and thoracic surgery. The world's first single and double lung transplants were performed at TGH in 1983 and 1986 and the world's first valve-sparing aortic root replacement was done by Tirone David at Toronto General Hospital in 1992. The Lung Transplant program is currently the largest in the world, performing 167 lung transplants in 2017. In 2015, surgeons performed the world's first triple organ transplant (lung, liver and pancreas) in 19 year old Reid Wylie at Toronto General Hospital. TGH teaches resident physicians, nurses, and technicians; it also conducts research through the Toronto General Research Institute.

Currently, Sophie, Duchess of Edinburgh, as a member of the Canadian Royal Family, is patron of the hospital.

== History ==
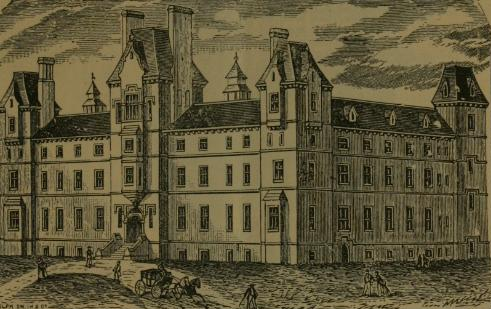
The Toronto General Hospital as it appeared in 1895

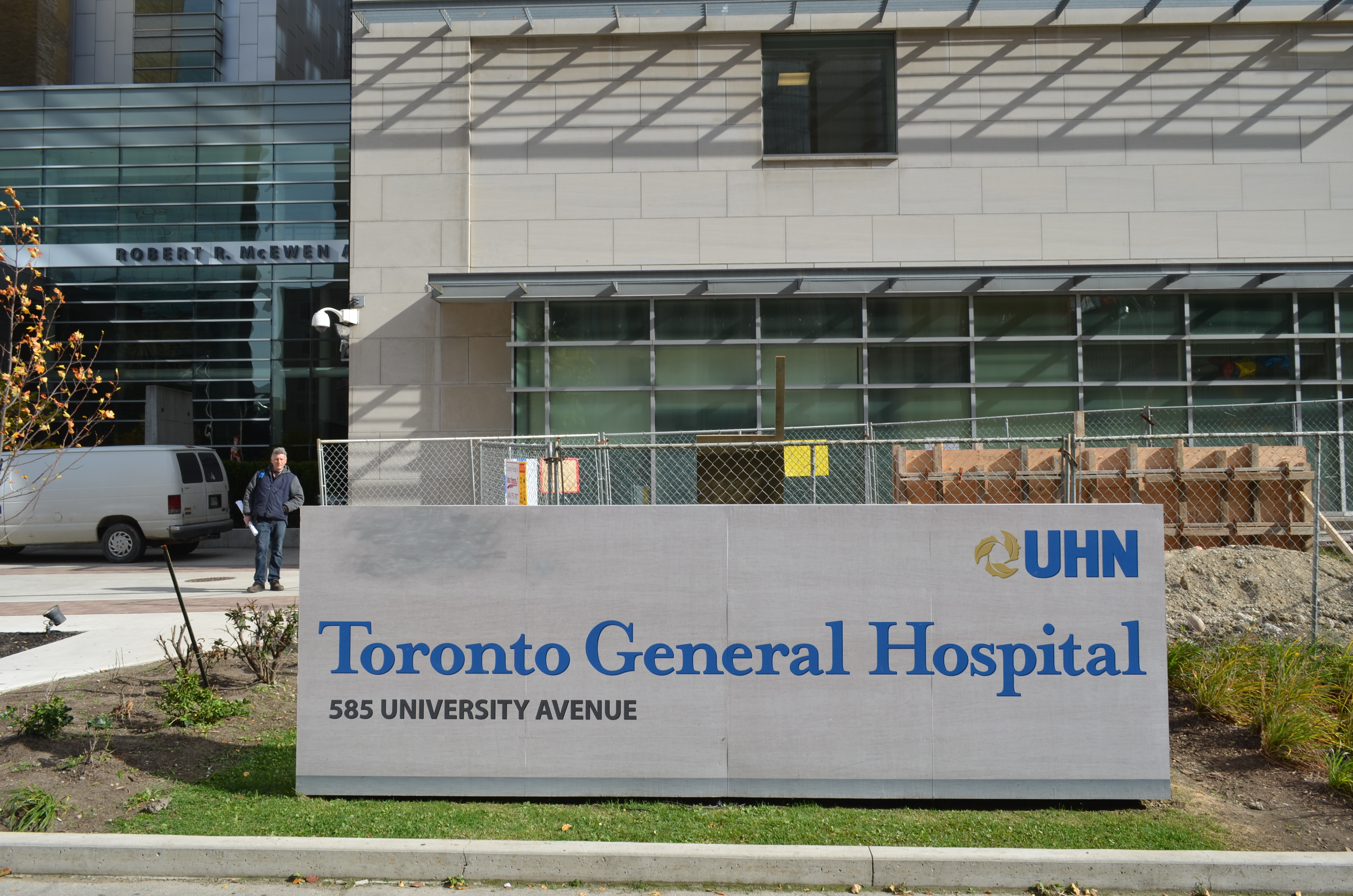
Toronto General Hospital main entrance

The hospital started as a small shed in the old town and was used as a British Army military hospital during the War of 1812, after which it was founded as a permanent institution – York General Hospital – in 1829, at John and King Streets (now home to Bell Lightbox). In 1855 a new home for the hospital was built on the north side of Gerrard Street, east of Parliament, using a design by architect William Hay. In 1913, the hospital moved to College Street, near its current location, expanding and upgrading over the ensuing years. The 1913 structure, previously called the College Wing, was eventually sold by the hospital, to become the home of the MaRS Discovery District after a new wing for the TGH was completed and opened in 2002.

== Ajmera Transplant Centre ==
Toronto General Hospital was the largest organ transplantation center in North America in 2017, performing 639 transplants in total.

- Lung - TGH performed 167 lung transplants, making it the largest lung transplant program in the world.
- Liver - TGH performed 195 liver Transplants with 39 of those living donor transplants in 2017 making the program the largest in North America.
- Kidney - TGH performed 202 kidney transplants, 65 of those were living donor transplants, making the program the largest in Canada
- Heart - TGH performed 34 heart transplants in 2017, making the program the largest in Canada
- Pancreas - TGH performed 8 pancreas transplants in 2018, making the program the largest in Canada.
- Kidney-Pancreas - TGH performed 34 kidney-pancreas transplants in 2017, making the program the largest in Canada.
- Small Bowel - TGH performed 1 small bowel transplant in 2018.

== Peter Munk Cardiac Centre ==
Toronto General Hospital is the home of the Peter Munk Cardiac Centre (PMCC), which is one of the largest open heart centers in Canada and is ranked first in Canada and in the top ten in North America for academic productivity. Many clinical firsts in cardiovascular care were performed at TGH. The center is named after Peter Munk, the founder and chairman of Barrick Gold corporation, who donated $100 million in 2017, the largest donation to a hospital in Canadian history, at the time. He donated a total of $175 million since 1993 to the hospital.

== Research ==
Toronto General Hospital has had many research achievements, including:

- The development and first clinical use of insulin in the treatment of diabetes – 1922
- World's first clinical use of the anticoagulant heparin – 1935
- World's first external heart pacemaker used in open heart resuscitation – 1950
- World's first successful valve transplant – 1955
- World's first coronary care unit – 1965
- World's first successful single lung transplant (Tom Hall) – 1983
- World's first successful double lung transplant (Ann Harrison) – 1986
- World's first aortic valve transplant using the Toronto Heart Valve – 1987
- Canada's first and largest HIV/AIDS clinic, the Immunodeficiency Clinic – 1994
- World's first successful triple organ transplant (lung, liver and pancreas) – 2015
- Canada's first hand transplant – 2016

== See also ==
- List of Canadian organizations with royal patronage
- William Rawlins Beaumont
- List of hospitals in Toronto
- University of Ottawa Heart Institute
