= Lung allocation score =

System for prioritising lung transplants

The lung allocation score (LAS) was a numerical value used by the United Network for Organ Sharing (UNOS) to assign relative priority for distributing donated lungs for transplantation within the United States. The lung allocation score takes into account various measures of a patient's health in order to direct donated organs towards the patients who would best benefit from a lung transplant.

The LAS system replaced the older method within the United States of allocating donated lungs strictly on a first-come, first-served basis, according to blood type compatibility and distance from the donor hospital. The reason for this continuing analysis was the need to balance on one hand the desire to help those patients in direct need, versus the statistical likelihood of the patient to survive the procedure, as well as the post-operative risks of infection and transplant rejection.

The LAS was replaced by the Lung Continuous Allocation Score, lung CAS, on March 9, 2023.

== Lung allocation scoring method ==
The lung allocation score is calculated from a series of formulas that take into account the statistical probability of a patient's survival in the next year without a transplant, and the projected length of survival post-transplant. A raw allocation score, summarizing all of the above values, is calculated, and finally this score is normalized to obtain the actual LAS, which has a range from 0 to 100. Higher lung allocation scores indicate the patient is more likely to benefit from a lung transplant.

The post-transplant survival measure is one-year survival after transplantation of the lungs. Factors used to predict it include FVC, ventilator use, age, creatinine, NYHA class and diagnosis. It is used for calculation of transplant benefit by subtracting another variable called waitlist urgency measure from it. The final lung allocation score, which is meant to reflect the overall transplant benefit, incorporates this element as well.

=== Factors in calculating the LAS ===
There are many factors that are used to calculate the lung allocation score:

- diagnosis of the patient (e.g. emphysema, cystic fibrosis, Pulmonary Fibrosis, etc.);
- age of the patient;
- body mass index;
- presence or absence of diabetes mellitus;
- ability to function according to the NYHA scale;
- percentage of predicted forced vital capacity (FVC);
- systolic pressure of the pulmonary artery;
- mean pressure of the pulmonary artery (only required of sarcoidosis patients);
- pulmonary capillary wedge pressure (PCW pressure);
- flow rate of supplemental oxygen required at rest;
- distance walked in six minutes;
- need or lack of need for continuous mechanical ventilation;
- levels of creatinine in the blood.

UNOS requires that the various medical results must be current, i.e. obtained within the last six months, or the relevant factor is assigned a zero value. Exceptions can be made if a patient is deemed unable to complete a test due to his or her current condition. In such a case, the physician must obtain permission from the UNOS Lung Review Board to submit a reasonable estimate of how the patient would perform.

In certain instances, a physician may petition the UNOS Lung Review Board to modify a patient's assigned LAS if it is felt that a patient's particular circumstances are not adequately represented by the regular LAS calculation system.

== How the LAS score is used ==
The lung allocation score is an important part of the recipient selection process, but other factors are also considered. Patients who are under the age of 12 are still given priority based on how long they have been on the transplant waitlist. The length of time spent on the list is also the deciding factor when multiple patients have the same lung allocation score.

- Blood type compatibility
  The blood type of the donor must match that of the recipient due to certain antigens that are present on donated lungs. A mismatch in blood type can lead to a strong response by the immune system and subsequent rejection of the transplanted organs. In an ideal case, as many of the human leukocyte antigens as possible would also match between the donor and the recipient, but the desire to find a highly compatible donor organ must be balanced against the patient's immediacy of need.
- Age of donor
  The donated lung or lungs must be large enough to adequately oxygenate the patient, but small enough to fit within the recipient's chest cavity. Therefore, age is a consideration in the transplant process.

	Donor age <12	Donor age 12-17	Donor age 18+
1st priority candidate	age <12	age 12-17	age 18+
2nd priority candidate	age 12-17	age <12	age <12
3rd priority candidate	age 18+	age 18+	

- Distance from the donor hospital
  As donated lungs should be transplanted into the recipient within four to six hours of recovery, ideally both donor and transplant hospitals should be relatively near each other.

=== Illustrative example ===
A lung from a 16-year-old donor would first be offered to the person in the age group 12–17 with the highest lung allocation score and matching blood type in the vicinity of the transplant center. If there no suitable recipient in that age group, it would next be offered to the highest LAS-scoring candidate who is under 12 years of age. Finally, it would be offered to the highest LAS-scoring person of age 18 or older. If there is no suitable candidate within the area, the lung may be offered to someone farther away, within certain time and distance constraints.
