= Eduard Zirm =

Austrian ophthalmologist

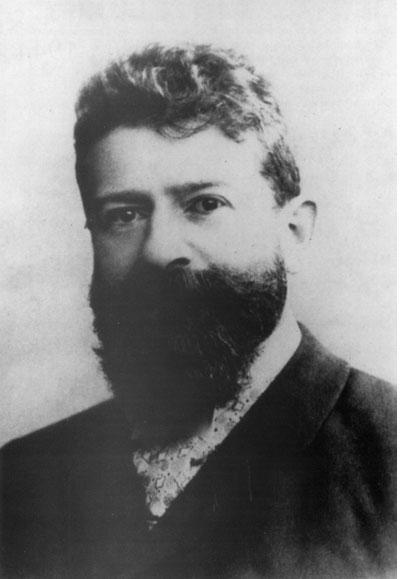
Eduard Zirm (1863-1944)

Eduard Konrad Zirm (18 March 1863 – 15 March 1944) was an Austrian ophthalmologist who performed the first successful human full-thickness corneal transplant on 7 December 1905.

== Biography ==
Zirm was born in Vienna on 18 March 1863. He studied medicine at the University of Vienna, and ophthalmology at the Eye Clinic there. After graduation, Zirm became an eye doctor at the Second Eye Clinic in Vienna, then accepted a position at a hospital in Olomouc, Moravia in 1892. There, he became chief of the new ophthalmology clinic that he helped establish.

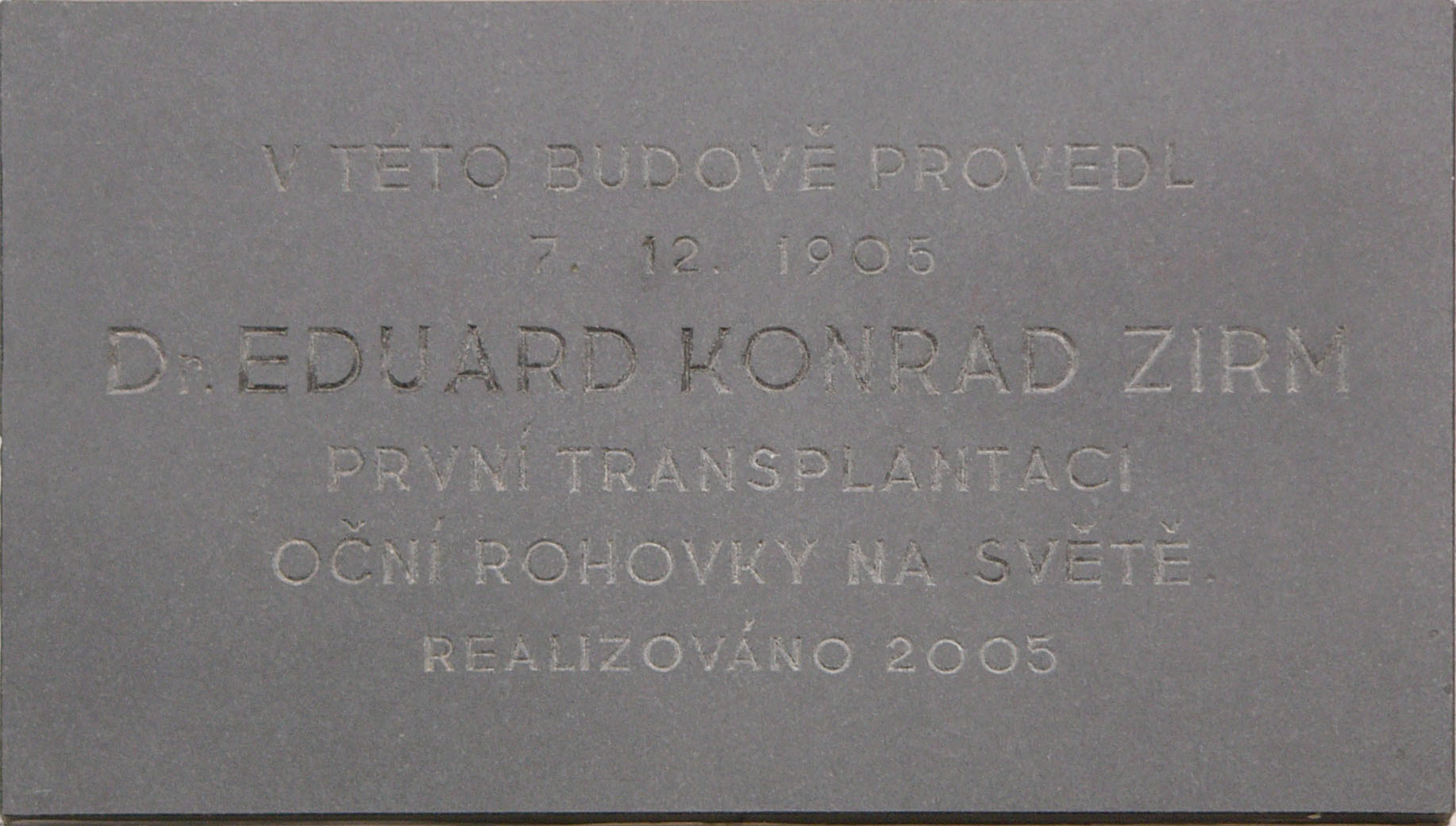
Memorial plaque at Eye Clinic in hospital in Olomouc shows the text in Czech: Dr. Eduard Konrad Zirm has performed the first transplant of the cornea in the world on 7 December 1905 in this building. [This plaque] was made in 2005.

== The first full-thickness corneal transplant operation ==
The human corneal transplantation (keratoplasty) had been attempted with little or no success throughout the 1800s using both animal donor cornea and human graft tissue. The donor tissue, whether animal or human, could either be transplanted as a full-thickness disc of cornea or partial-thickness (layers or lamellae) cornea attached to the host eye. By the late 1880s, lamellar grafts were considered to have a better chance of success than full-thickness corneal grafting which invariably failed a few days after the operation.

In 1905, Zirm encountered a patient named Alois Glogar, a 45-year-old day farm labourer from Olomouc, whose corneas in both eyes had turned white-gray and opaque a year earlier while working with slaking lime. Around the same time he examined Glogar, an 11-year-old boy named Karl Brauer was brought to Zirm's clinic with penetrating eye-injury to both eyes and iron metal foreign bodies irretrievably lodged in his eyes. When attempts to save Brauer's eyes were unsuccessful, Zirm, with the boy's father's permission enucleated them and saved the corneas for transplantation into Glogar's. Although complications affected one eye, the other remained clear allowing Glogar to return to work.

The operation and the consequent healing processes were difficult at that time because without a microscope and microsurgical instruments, it was impossible to suture the donor cornea to the host tissue. Therefore, Zirm successfully sutured the conjunctival tissue over the graft-host junction. During the twentieth century, parallel advances in microscopy, microsurgical instrumentation, anaesthesia, and asepsis have led to the increasing success of keratoplasty. Zirm 's method remains the basis for repairing corneal damage.

== Interests outside ophthalmology ==
Zirm played the violin and in his limited spare time studied natural philosophy.

His 1937 publication of Die Welt als Fühlen discussed ideas now called emotional intelligence for the first time. He also wrote many poems and stories.

Zimr died in 1944 in Olomouc, Protectorate of Bohemia and Moravia.

== Legacy ==
At the jubilee lecture relative to corneal transplant, Prof. Böck, the long-time head of the Second Ophthalmology Department at the University in Vienna said:

"The name of Dr. Eduard Zirm will always be connected with the great accomplishment of this medical technique. With pride the Ophthalmology Department of the University of Vienna includes him as one of its own".

In 2006, in a review of Zirm's landmark paper on his first successful full thickness corneal transplant, three English ophthalmologists concluded in the British Journal of Ophthalmology:

""Zirm showed undoubted skill and insight, but serendipity, as with many advances in medicine and science, must also have played some part in this remarkable achievement that paved the way for the successful treatment of many thousands of patients around the world with corneal disease"."
