= Organovo =

Medical laboratory and research company

Organovo Holdings, Inc.
- Company type: Public
- Industry: Biotech
- Founded: 2007; 19 years ago
- Headquarters: San Diego, California, U.S.
- Area served: Worldwide
- Key people: Keith Murphy (Executive Chairman); Norman Staskey (President, CFO, Principal Financial Officer)
- Revenue: US$0.12 Million (2024)
- Total assets: US$0.36 Million (2024)
- Website: organovo.com

Organovo Holdings, Inc. is an early-stage medical laboratory and research company which designs and develops functional, three dimensional human tissue (also known as 3D bioprinting technology) for medical research and therapeutic applications. Organovo was established in 2007 and is headquartered in San Diego, California. The company uses its internally developed NovoGen MMX Bioprinter for 3D bioprinting.

== Operations ==
The company bioprints and markets human tissues as a means of accelerating the preclinical drug testing and discovery process, enabling treatments to be created more quickly and at lower cost, and without immediate risks to living test subjects. Organovo has long-term expectations that this technology could be suitable for surgical therapy and transplantation. Organovo also partners with biopharmaceutical companies and academic medical centers to design, build, and validate more predictive in vitro tissues for disease modeling and toxicology. The living test tissues provide researchers the opportunity to test drugs before administering the drug to a living person; this bridges the gap between preclinical testing and clinical trials.

In 2015, Organovo signed an agreement to provide processes and technology to produce 3D printed human skin to L'Oreal for use in testing the safety and efficacy of cosmetic products.

In February 2025, Eli Lilly purchased Organovo's FXR program for $10 Million.

== 3D bioprinting process ==
The human body is made up of different cell types and many technologies for printing these cells vary in their ability to ensure stability and viability of the cells during the manufacturing process. The methods used for 3D bioprinting of cells are photolithography, magnetic 3D bioprinting, stereolithography, and direct cell extrusion. In each process, a physical biopsy of an organ is required. Certain cells from the biopsy are isolated and multiplied. These cells are then mixed with a liquefied material that provides oxygen and other nutrients to keep them alive outside of the human body. The mixture is then placed in a printer cartridge and structured using the patients’ medical scans.

== Financing ==
Organovo went public on OTC markets in 2012 via a reverse merger with shell company Real Estate Restoration and Rental, Inc. In July 2013, Organovo uplisted to the NYSE MKT. The company hit of market cap high of $700m in 2013. At the time of listing, Organovo had 22.4 million shares outstanding. In 2020 there were over 130 million.
