= Ann Harrison (lung transplant recipient) =

First human double lung transplant recipient (1944–2001)

Ann Harrison (September 24, 1944 – April 20, 2001) was the recipient of the world's first successful human double lung transplant. She survived for almost fifteen years after the surgery and died of unrelated causes.

== Operation ==
Harrison suffered from end-stage emphysema and thoracic surgeon Joel D. Cooper had told her that without surgery, she had only a few months to live. The operation was performed at Toronto General Hospital on November 26, 1986, when she received the lungs of an 18-year-old Kingston, Ontario, native who had recently died in a car accident. Cooper had previously successfully performed a single lung transplant on pulmonary fibrosis victim Tom Hall on November 7, 1983, but this was the first successful double lung transplant.

== Death ==
Ann Harrison died aged 56 at Toronto General Hospital on April 20, 2001, of a brain aneurysm unrelated to her operation. She was the world's longest surviving double-lung recipient until her 15-year record was broken in 2005 by cystic fibrosis patient Howell Graham of Wilmington, North Carolina.

Her surgeon, Dr Joel Cooper, in a eulogy said of her, "Ann began a new era, one that has brought immense relief to emphysema patients. Having received this gift, she became a den mother for so many other patients, encouraging them in their quest, celebrating with them their victories, and consoling them and their families in their losses." Dr Cooper shows a picture of Ann Harrison every time he lectures on transplantation and says, "I still marvel when someone so close to death is returned to a vigorous life."
