= NovoGen =

3D printing technology

NovoGen is a proprietary form of 3D printing technology that allows scientists to assemble living tissue cells into a desired pattern. When combined with an extracellular matrix, the cells can be arranged into complex structures, such as organs. Designed by Organovo, the NovoGen technology has been successfully integrated by Invetech with a production printer that is intended to help develop processes for tissue repair and organ development.
