= Lung transplantation =

Surgical replacement of a patient's lungs

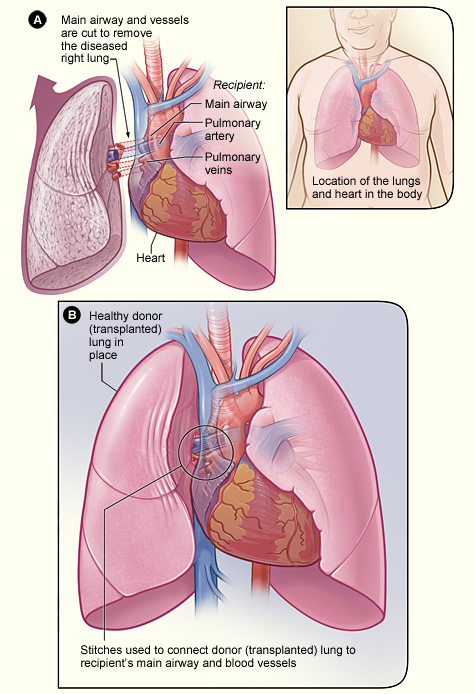
- Illustration showing the process of a lung transplant. In figure A, the airway and blood vessels between a recipient's diseased right lung and heart are cut. The inset image shows the location of the lungs and heart in the body. In figure B, a healthy donor lung is stitched to the recipient's blood vessels and airway.
- Other names: Pulmonary transplantation
- ICD-9-CM: 33.5
- MeSH: D016040

Lung transplantation, or pulmonary transplantation, is a surgical procedure in which one or both lungs are replaced by lungs from a donor. Donor lungs can be retrieved from a living or deceased donor. A living donor can only donate one lung lobe. With some lung diseases, a recipient may only need to receive a single lung. With other lung diseases such as cystic fibrosis, it is imperative that a recipient receive two lungs. While lung transplants carry certain associated risks, they can also extend life expectancy and enhance the quality of life for those with end stage pulmonary disease.

== Qualifying conditions ==
Lung transplantation is the therapeutic measure of last resort for patients with end-stage lung disease who have exhausted all other available treatments without improvement. A variety of conditions may make such surgery necessary. The most common indications for a lung transplant are pulmonary fibrosis, chronic obstructive pulmonary disease (COPD), cystic fibrosis, and pulmonary vascular disease including pulmonary hypertension or pulmonary arterial hypertension.

== Contraindications ==
Despite the severity of a patient's respiratory condition, certain pre-existing conditions may make a person a poor candidate for lung transplantation. Absolute contraindications for undergoing a lung transplant include:

- Patient refusal to undergo a lung transplant
- Cancer with a high risk of recurrence or death
- Chronic kidney disease with a glomerular filtration rate less than 40 or being on dialysis (unless also being considered for a kidney transplant)
- Acute kidney failure
- Acute coronary syndrome or heart attack in the last 30 days
- Stroke in the last 30 days
- Liver cirrhosis (unless also being considered for a concomitant liver transplant)
- Acute liver failure
- Septic shock
- Active infection outside the lungs
- Active tuberculosis
- HIV with a detectable viral load. Active hepatitis B and C are relative contraindications to lung transplantation and increase the risk of complications, including when liver fibrosis is present.
  - However, hepatitis C patients are receiving transplanted lungs if the disease is controlled or cured. Similarly, those with HIV and an undetectable viral load can undergo a lung transplant routinely.
  - Similarly, those with HIV can receive donor lungs infected with HIV. People who have had a hepatitis B vaccine can receive hepatitis B infected donor lungs and those without hepatitis C can receive hepatitis C infected lungs and then undergo antiviral therapy to cure the hepatitis C.
- Debility with limited recoverability during post-transplant rehabilitation
- Progressive cognitive impairment, such as dementia
- History of non-adherence to medical therapies
- Active substance use or substance use disorder, including tobacco smoking, vaping, or intravenous drug use
- Other severe and uncontrolled medical conditions that are expected to limit post-transplant survival

Candidates for lung transplantation are selected and assessed by a medical team including pulmonologists, transplant surgeons, primary care physicians, pulmonary rehabilitation specialists. Generally, to be considered for a lung transplant, a candidate has to have an estimated risk of dying from lung disease greater than 50% within 2 years, and a likelihood of being alive in the period after a transplant of at least 80%.

== History ==
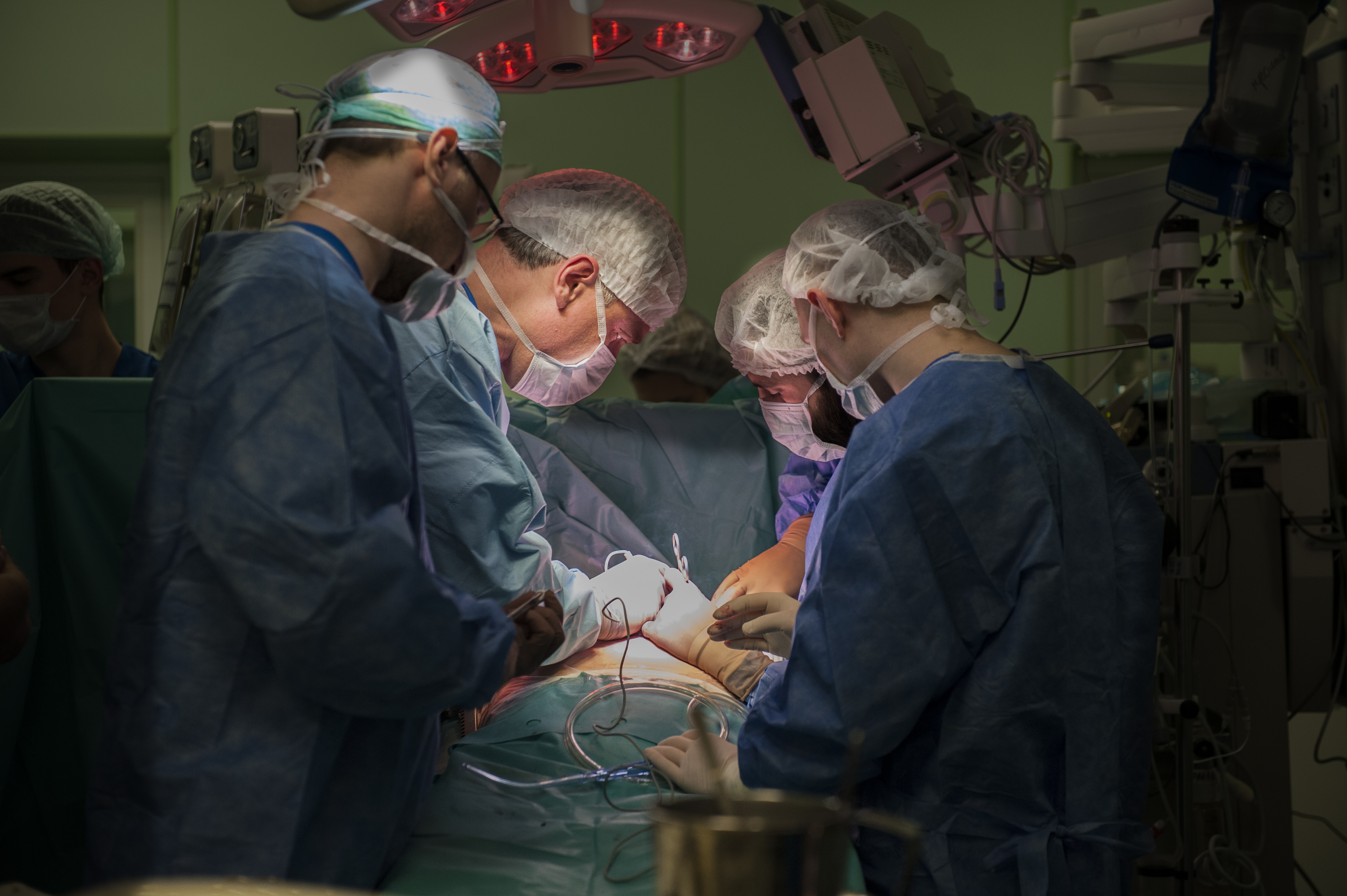
Doctors at the Sklifosovsky Institute start a lung transplantation operation. The operation will last about 12 hours.

The history of organ transplants began with several attempts that were unsuccessful due to transplant rejection. Animal experimentation by various researchers, including Vladimir Demikhov and Henry Metras, during the 1940s and 1950s first demonstrated that the procedure was technically feasible. James Hardy of the University of Mississippi performed the first human lung transplant on June 11, 1963. Following a single-lung transplantation, the patient, identified later as convicted murderer John Richard Russell, survived for 18 days. From 1963 to 1978, multiple attempts at lung transplantation failed because of rejection and problems with anastomotic bronchial healing (i.e. reconnection of Bronchial passages). It was only after the invention of the heart-lung machine, coupled with the development of immunosuppressive drugs such as ciclosporin, that organs such as the lungs could be transplanted with a reasonable chance of patient recovery.

The first successful transplant surgery involving the lungs was a heart-lung transplant, performed by Dr. Bruce Reitz of Stanford University in 1981 on a woman who had idiopathic pulmonary hypertension. Subsequent advances in the 1980s led to the first single and double lung transplants by thoracic surgeon Joel Cooper. While working at Toronto General Hospital in Toronto, Ontario, Cooper completed the first successful long-term single lung transplant in 1983 (in patient Tom Hall), the first successful long-term double lung transplant in 1986 (in Ann Harrison) and the first successful long-term double lung transplant for a person with cystic fibrosis in 1988.

In 1988, Vera Dwyer, a woman from County Sligo in Ireland, was diagnosed with an irreversible, chronic and fibrotic lung disease. Later on that year, she received a single lung transplant in the UK. In November 2018, Ms. Dwyer was recognized as the world's longest surviving single lung transplant recipient in an event at the Mater Hospital in Dublin. She died in 2021, thirty-three years after her transplant.

In 2021, the team at Cedars-Sinai in Los Angeles, California completed the world's first robotic lung transplant, allowing a minimally invasive approach to the procedure.

The first lung transplant completed by James Hardy was commemorated in the American Innovation dollar Mississippi coin in 2023.

== Transplant requirements ==
=== Requirements for potential donors ===
Ideal donors (living or dead) for a lung transplant include those who are younger than 55 years old, have normal chest x-rays, have normal gas exchange in their lungs, do not have a history of chest trauma, do not have aspiration (spillage of stomach contents into the lungs) or sepsis, have no lung disease or signs of lung inflammation, have no active lung infections, have not had previous cardio-pulmonary surgeries, do not smoke (or who have a limited smoking history, defined by some centers as less than 20 pack-years), have ABO blood group compatibility with the recipient and have appropriate size-matched lungs (the donor lungs must fit in the recipients chest cavity) with the potential recipient. Using highly selected lungs from donors who are older than 70 years old has similar recipient survival and lung function as compared to younger donor lungs. Donor lungs can sometimes be size-matched by being surgically downsized prior to grafting into a recipient. Most donors do not meet all criteria for an ideal donor, but are still selected on a case-by-case basis.

=== Requirements for potential recipients ===
While a transplant center is free to set its own criteria for transplant candidates, certain requirements are generally agreed upon:

- End-stage lung disease
- Has exhausted other available therapies without success
- No other chronic end-stage medical conditions (e.g., heart, kidney, liver)
  - Some patients with these diseases, if their condition can be made to improve to the point where they are stable enough to survive the operation, are granted an exception. Many individuals with end-stage lung disease will have acute or chronic illnesses in other organs. These patients that are often acutely deteriorating and are critically ill can be successfully "bridged" to transplantation with the use of extracorporeal membrane oxygenation. It can stabilize those with acute respiratory failure while waiting for transplantation.
- No current infections or recent cancer. Some patients, on a case by case basis and based on estimated survival after the treatment of malignant disease, may be allowed after the discussion within multidisciplinary teams. There are also certain cases where pre-existing infection is unavoidable, as with many patients with cystic fibrosis. In such cases, transplant centers, at their own discretion, may accept or reject patients with current infections of B. cepacia or MRSA
- No HIV or hepatitis, although some recipients that are hepatitis C positive can receive a lung from a hepatitis C positive donor, and individuals with HIV who can be stabilized and can have a low HIV viral load may be eligible;
- No alcohol, smoking, or drug abuse (some individuals who can cease these habits and comply with treatment may be allowed after the professional assessment)
- Within an acceptable weight range (marked undernourishment or obesity are both associated with increased mortality)
- Age (single vs. double tx)
- Acceptable psychological profile
- Has a social support system
- Financially able to pay for expenses (where medical care is paid for directly by the patient)
- Able to comply with post-transplant regimen. A lung transplant is a major operation with complex follow-up, and the patient must be willing to adhere to a lifetime regimen of medications as well as continuing medical care.

=== Medical tests for potential transplant candidates ===
Patients who are being considered for lung transplantation undergo extensive medical tests to evaluate their overall health status and suitability for transplant surgery.

- Blood typing; the recipient's blood type must match the donor's, due to antigens that are present on donated lungs. A mismatch of blood type can lead to a strong response by the immune system and subsequent rejection of the transplanted organs
- Tissue typing; ideally, the lung tissue would also match as closely as possible between the donor and the recipient, but the desire to find a highly compatible donor organ must be balanced against the patient's immediacy of need
- Chest X-ray; to verify the size of the lungs and the chest cavity
- Pulmonary function tests
- CT Scan (High Resolution Thoracic & Abdominal)
- Bone mineral density scan
- Radionuclide angiography (Gated cardiac blood pool scan)
- Cardiac stress test
- Ventilation/perfusion (V/Q) scan
- Electrocardiogram
- Cardiac catheterization
- Echocardiogram

=== Lung allocation score ===
Before 2005, donor lungs within the United States were allocated by the United Network for Organ Sharing on a first-come, first-served basis to patients on the transplant list. This was replaced by the current system, in which prospective lung recipients of age of 12 and older are assigned a lung allocation score or LAS, which takes into account various measures of the patient's health. The new system allocates donated lungs according to the immediacy of need rather than how long a patient has been on the transplant list. Patients who are under the age of 12 are still given priority based on how long they have been on the transplant waitlist. The length of time spent on the list is also the deciding factor when multiple patients have the same lung allocation score.

== Types of lung transplant ==
=== Lobe ===
A lobe transplant is a surgery in which part of a living or deceased donor's lung is removed and used to replace the recipient's diseased lung. In living donation, this procedure requires the donation of lobes from two different people, replacing a lung on each side of the recipient. Donors who have been properly screened should be able to maintain a normal quality of life despite the reduction in lung volume. In deceased lobar transplantation, one donor can provide both lobes when the donor is larger than the recipient.

=== Single-lung ===
Many patients can be helped by the transplantation of a single healthy lung. The donated lung typically comes from a donor who has been pronounced brain-dead.

=== Double-lung ===
Certain patients may require both lungs to be replaced. This is especially the case for people with cystic fibrosis, due to the bacterial colonization commonly found within such patients' lungs; if only one lung were transplanted, bacteria in the native lung could potentially infect the newly transplanted organ.

=== Heart–lung ===
Some respiratory patients may also have severe cardiac disease which would necessitate a heart transplant. These patients can be treated by a surgery in which both lungs and the heart are replaced by organs from a donor or donors.

A particularly involved example of this has been termed a "domino transplant" in the media. First performed in 1987, this type of transplant typically involves the transplantation of a heart and lungs into recipient A, whose own healthy heart is removed and transplanted into recipient B.

== Procedure ==
While the surgical details will depend on the type of transplant, many steps are common to all these procedures. Before operating on the recipient, the transplant surgeon inspects the donor lung(s) for signs of damage or disease. If the lung or lungs are approved, then the recipient is connected to an IV line and various monitoring equipment, including pulse oximetry. The patient will be given general anesthesia, and a machine will breathe for him or her.

It takes about one hour for the pre-operative preparation of the patient. A single lung transplant takes about four to eight hours, while a double lung transplant takes about six to twelve hours to complete. A history of prior chest surgery may complicate the procedure and require additional time.

=== Single-lung ===
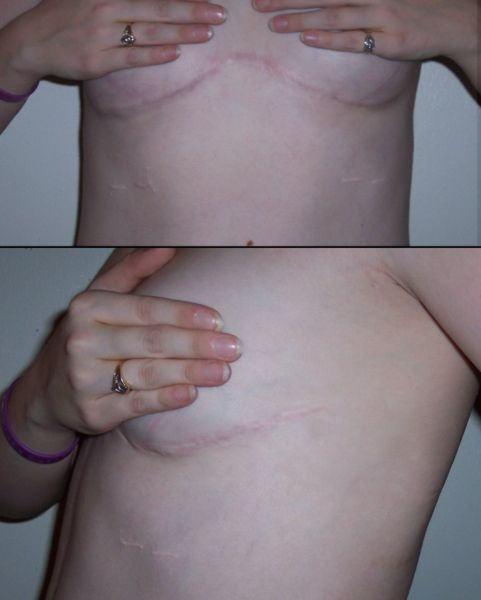
Incision scarring from a double lung transplant

In single-lung transplants, the lung with the worse pulmonary function is chosen for replacement. If both lungs function equally, then the right lung is usually favored for removal because it avoids having to maneuver around the heart, as would be required for excision of the left lung.

In a single-lung transplant the process starts out after the donor lung has been inspected and the decision to accept the donor lung for the patient has been made. An incision is generally made from under the shoulder blade around the chest, ending near the sternum. An alternate method involves an incision under the breastbone. In the case of a singular lung transplant the lung is collapsed, the blood vessels in the lung tied off, and the lung removed at the bronchial tube. The donor lung is placed, the blood vessels and bronchial tube reattached, and the lung reinflated. To make sure the lung is satisfactory and to clear any remaining blood and mucus in the new lung a bronchoscopy will be performed. When the surgeons are satisfied with the performance of the lung the chest incision will be closed.

=== Double-lung ===
A double-lung transplant, also known as a bilateral transplant, can be done either sequentially, en bloc, or simultaneously. Sequential is more common than en bloc.

The transplantation process starts after the donor lungs are inspected and the decision to transplant has been made. An incision is then made from under the patient's armpit, around to the sternum, and then back towards the other armpit; this is known as a clamshell incision. Another approach can be achieved with bilateral anterior thoracotomies. Intraoperatively, lung transplantation can be performed with the use of extracorporeal membrane oxygenation, cardiopulmonary bypass (heart-lung machine) or without any mechanical circulatory support. Intraoperative mechanical circulatory support can be required due to severe pulmonary hypertension, haemodynamic instability or inability to tolerate one-lung ventilation. In the case of a sequential transplant the recipient's lung with the poorest lung functions is collapsed, the blood vessels tied off, and cut at the corresponding bronchi. The new lung is then placed and the blood vessels reanastomosed (reconnected). To make sure the bronchial anastomosis is satisfactory before transplanting the other a bronchoscopy is performed.

== Post-operative care ==
Immediately following the surgery, the patient is placed in an intensive care unit for monitoring, normally for a period of a few days. The patient is put on a ventilator to assist breathing. Nutritional needs are generally met via total parenteral nutrition, although in some cases a nasogastric tube is sufficient for feeding. Chest tubes are put in so that excess fluids may be removed. Because the patient is confined to bed, a urinary catheter is used. IV lines are used in the neck and arm for monitoring and giving medications. After a few days, barring any complications, the patient may be transferred to a general inpatient ward for further recovery. The average hospital stay following a lung transplant is generally one to three weeks, though complications may require a longer period of time. After this stage, patients are typically required to attend rehabilitation gym for approximately 3 months to regain fitness. Light weights, exercise bike, treadmill, stretches and more are all a part of the rehabilitation programme. Postoperative rehabilitation is crucial for the outcomes of transplant recipients and has evolved since the late 20th century.

There may be a number of side effects following the surgery. Because certain nerve connections to the lungs are cut during the procedure, transplant recipients cannot feel the urge to cough or feel when their new lungs are becoming congested. They must therefore make conscious efforts to take deep breaths and cough in order to clear secretions from the lungs. Their heart rate responds less quickly to exertion due to the cutting of the vagus nerve that would normally help regulate it. They may also notice a change in their voice due to potential damage to the nerves that coordinate the vocal cords.

Evidence suggests that exercise may contribute to speeding up physical recovery in adults after lung transplantation, helping to minimize disability from physical inactivity, both pre and post-transplant. However, there are no detailed guidelines on how exercise should be performed in this type of population.

The results obtained from a 2021 Systematic Review concluded that the effects of exercise in this population are still very questionable. While some studies do report benefits taken from exercising, while others have not reached the same conclusions. Nonetheless, the articles involved in this systematic review reported enhancements in muscle strength and increased bone mineral density as well as improvements in 6MWT.

== Risks ==
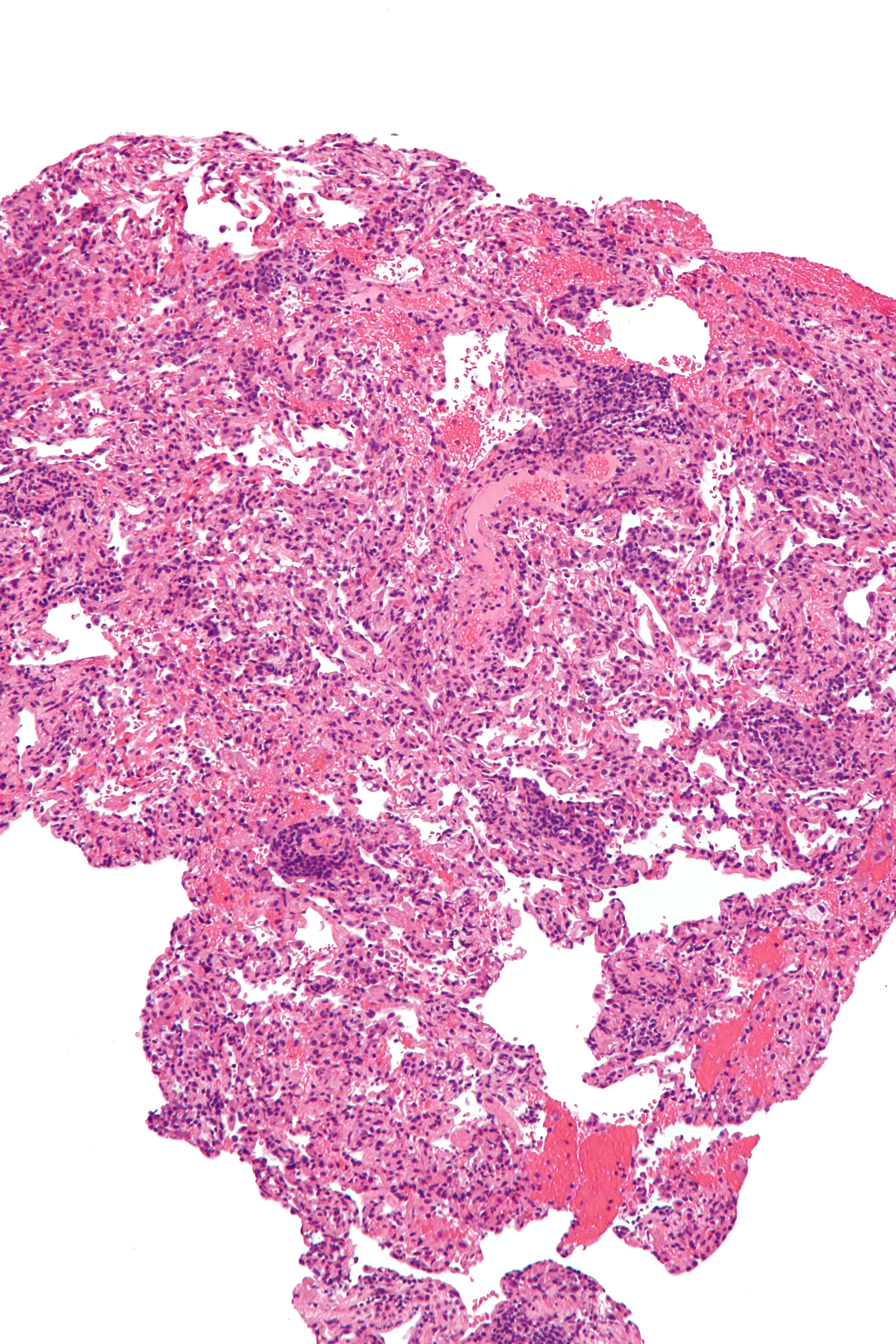
Micrograph showing lung transplant rejection. Lung biopsy. H&E stain.

As with any surgical procedure, there are risks of bleeding and infection. The newly transplanted lung itself may fail to properly heal and function. Ten percent of transplanted lungs have a partial tearing (dehisence) of the surgical airway connection. Because a large portion of the patient's body has been exposed to the outside air, sepsis is a possibility, so antibiotics are given preventatively. Other complications include Post-transplant lymphoproliferative disorder, a form of lymphoma due to the immune suppressants, and gastrointestinal inflammation and ulceration of the stomach and esophagus.

Transplant rejection is a serious concern, both immediately after the surgery and continuing throughout the patient's life. Because the transplanted lung or lungs come from another person, the recipient's immune system will see it as an invader and attempt to neutralize it.

Signs of rejection include:

- fever;
- flu-like symptoms, including chills, dizziness, nausea, general feeling of illness, night sweats;
- increased difficulty in breathing;
- worsening pulmonary test results;
- increased chest pain or tenderness;
- increase or decrease in body weight of more than two kilograms in a 24-hour period.

In order to prevent transplant rejection and subsequent damage to the new lung or lungs, a person must take a regimen of immunosuppressive drugs. People will usually have to take a combination of immunosuppressants in order to reduce the risk of rejection. The immunosuppressive regimen usually consists of a calcineurin inhibitor such as cyclosporine or tacrolimus, low dose glucocorticoids, and a cell cycle inhibitor such as azathioprine or mycophenolate mofetil. Maintenance immunosuppression to prevent immune mediated organ rejection is universal after a lung transplant. Basiliximab is the immunosuppressant of choice in the time immediately before and after a transplant.

The immunosuppressants that are needed to prevent organ rejection also introduce some risks. By lowering the body's ability to mount an immune reaction, these medicines also increase the chances of infection. Antibiotics may be prescribed in order to treat or prevent such infections. In turn, infection may increase the risk of rejection. Certain medications may also have nephrotoxic or other potentially harmful side-effects. Other medications may also be prescribed in order to help alleviate these side effects. There is also the risk that a patient may have an allergic reaction to the medications. Close follow-up care is required in order to balance the benefits of these drugs versus their potential risks.

Chronic rejection, meaning repeated bouts of rejection symptoms beyond the first year after the transplant surgery, occurs in approximately 50% of patients. Such chronic rejection presents itself as bronchiolitis obliterans, or less frequently, atherosclerosis.

== Prognosis ==
The median survival after a lung transplant is 6.7 years. Seventeen percent of lung transplant recipients die of cancer, most commonly lung cancer or lymphoproliferative diseases. Chronic immunosuppression, previous smoking and chronic lung disease in the recipient are all thought to contribute to this cancer risk. Chronic lung allograft dysfunction (CLAD), a type of immune mediated inflammation of the transplanted lung, is associated with poor outcomes after a lung transplant, including transplant failure, need for another lung transplant and death. The incidence of CLAD is 50% within 5 years of transplantation.

Frailty is associated with poor outcomes after a lung transplant, but this risk may be mitigated by pre-transplant pulmonary rehabilitation. Obesity may also be a risk factor for complications after a lung transplant, but some have argued that adiposity (or body fat distribution) is a better prognostic indicator.

A 2019 cohort study of nearly 10,000 lung transplant recipients in the US demonstrated significantly improved long-term survival using sirolimus + tacrolimus (median survival 8.9 years) instead of mycophenolate mofetil + tacrolimus (median survival 7.1 years) for immunosuppressive therapy starting at one year after transplant. Since sirolimus is not administered until at least 3–12 months after transplant, these median survival estimates were conditional on surviving 1 year post-transplant. As lung transplantation has improved since the late 20th century with advancements in perioperative management, surgical technique and postoperative rehabilitation, 5-year survival has increased even up to 60-70%.

== See also ==
- Sarah Murnaghan lung transplant controversy
- Post-transplant survival measure
