= The Final Rule =

The Final Rule is a national policy in the United States that dictates the protocol for all cadaveric organ donation. The Final Rule replaced a variety of local and regional protocols with a unified policy for the first time. It also increased the Department of Health and Human Services' control of organ donation.

The Final Rule was issued by the U.S. Department of Health and Human Services and dictates the process to be taken by organ procurement organizations in conjunction with United Network for Organ Sharing to match donors with potential recipients. The Final Rule dramatically changed the way organ donations were allocated in the United States, moving away from a system that favored geographic areas with large donor banks towards a system that prioritized a patient's need for an organ transplant over their proximity to the donor. This move reflects an increased ability to successfully preserve and transfer organs for organ transplantation farther than was previously possible. This move was controversial among areas with larger donor banks because there were concerns that the rule would disincentivize organ donation. Donor banks believed donors would be less likely to donate if the organs were being transferred out of state.

Originally proposed in 1998, the Final Rule was not implemented until March 2000. Implementation was delayed in order to collect public input due to lawsuits including two brought by the State of Wisconsin and the State of New Jersey seeking injunctive relief from the ruling. The Final Rule as it stands today allows for local recipients to be considered first but directs organ procurement organizations to offer organs nationally if a local match cannot be made, taking the urgency of need into account. The current ruling also gives the Department of Health and Human Services veto power over any policies created by the Organ Procurement and Transplantation Network, administered by the United Network for Organ Sharing, increasing the direct role of the federal government in organ donation.
