= OPTN =

OPTN may refer to:

- Optineurin
- Organ Procurement and Transplantation Network, operated by the United Network for Organ Sharing, which facilitates organ transplantation in the United States
