= Organ transplantation in Japan =

Organ transplantation in Japan is regulated by the 1997 Organ Transplant Law which legalized organ procurement from "brain dead" donors. After an early involvement in organ transplantation that was on a par with developments in the rest of the world, attitudes in Japan altered after a transplant by surgeon Juro Wada in 1968 failed, and a subsequent ban on cadaveric organ donation lasted 30 years. The first transplant after the Organ Transplant Law had defined "brain death" took place in February 1999.

Due to cultural reasons and a relative distrust of modern medicine, the rate of organ donation in Japan is significantly lower than in Western countries.

== History ==
The first organ transplant in Japan took place at Niigata University in 1956 when a kidney was temporarily transplanted to a patient with acute renal failure. In 1964 a permanent and full-scale kidney transplant was successfully undertaken at the University of Tokyo, and by 1992 nearly 9,000 kidney transplants had taken place. In the same year, a liver transplant was performed at Chiba University by Professor Komei Nakayama. The first heart transplant in Japan was conducted at Sapporo Medical University in 1968 by Juro Wada. This operation attracted concerns that Wada's evaluation of brain death was inappropriate, and even though an investigation of possible criminal liability was dismissed, a distrust of organ transplanting developed, particularly of transplants from brain dead donors. This brought subsequent developments in transplanting to a halt.

The 1997 law required dead donators to be over 15 alongside both written donor consent and family approval. The 2010 revision removed the age limit and made the system opt-out while retaining the need for family approval. Additionally dead donors could designate comparable family members as priority recipients beforehand. The law change resulting in a change of 7.2 dead donors per year between 1999 to 2010 to 53.4 between 2010 to 2016.

The amount of dead donors fell during the Covid-19 pandemic, but has rebounded with 150 cases in 2023.

Paediatric heart transplants are rare, resulting in transplant tourism to North America, where most foreign paediatric heart transplant receivers are Japanese. Europe and Australia do not accept Japanese patients for organ donation following the 2008 Declaration of Istanbul.

The Japan Organ Transplant Network, founded in 1975 as the Kidney Transplant Promotion Association, helps to educate and obtain consent from donor's families, transport organs and select recipients among other related activities. It has helped with potential donors declaring intent.

Akabayashi et al. gives reasons for the relatively low amount of dead transplants as the low need due to live transplantations being common due to familism and national insurance coverage reducing the need, and the need for family consent.

== Cultural attitudes ==
The Japanese people's views regarding life, death, ethics and religion have influenced their negative attitude toward organ transplanting. The Wada heart transplant in 1968 increased a sense of apprehension, especially regarding the evaluation of brain death. The Shinto religion regards death as impure, and has tainted connotations which have carried through into Japanese culture.

Factors such as gotai manzoku from Buddhism emphasising intactness of the body, familism leading to the need of a family consensus, disregard for those outside their inner circle.

Older generations have significantly worse attitudes toward cadaveric donations than younger ones. This is partly affected by the fact that all major high school contemporary society and ethics textbooks cover brain-dead organ transplantation.
