= Southwest Transplant Alliance =

Non-profit organ procurement organization

Southwest Transplant Alliance (STA) is a United States non-profit organ procurement organization (OPO) headquartered in Dallas, Texas and founded in 1974. It is one of 58 federally designated OPOs in the US and one of three that service Texas.

STA allocates donated organs and manages their recovery, preservation, and transportation in between donation and transplantation. It has processed over 22,000 organs since its founding.

The organization serves 11 transplant centers and over 280 hospitals in various areas of Texas, including Dallas, El Paso, Galveston, and Texarkana.

As with all other OPOs in the US, STA is, by law, a member of the Organ Procurement and Transplantation Network (a federally-mandated network administered by the United Network for Organ Sharing (UNOS)) and a member of the Association of Organ Procurement Organizations. The Centers for Medicare and Medicaid Services regulates STA and other OPOs.
