= Richard Milenthal =

American executive and philanthropist

- Title: Chairman, Founder and CEO of The Shipyard
- Spouse: Karen Milenthal
- Children: 3
- Website: https://theshipyard.com

Richard Milenthal is an American executive, entrepreneur and philanthropist. Milenthal is the Chairman, Founder and Chief Executive Officer of The Shipyard, an indie marketing agency, based in Columbus, Ohio, coining the tagline "Engineering Brand Love." In 2023, The Shipyard was nominated as one of AdWeek's "Fastest Growing Agencies."

Milenthal has previously served as CEO and founder of Engauge, a social media agency he started in 2007, before it was acquired by the advertising agency, Publicis Group in 2013. In 2011, he co-founded and became Vice Chairman of WE Digital, a social media agency based in China. He is the former Chairman of Worldwide Partners, a network of independent advertising agencies.

== Early life and education ==
Born in Columbus, Ohio, Milenthal is the son of Saul and Bernice Milenthal. He grew up in the Columbus Jewish Community and graduated from Eastmoor High School. Milenthal went to Ohio State University, graduating in 1982, with a major in communications and a minor in political science. He has twice been named alumni of the year by the OSU Department of Communications and Journalism, in 2007 and 2022.

== Career ==
=== 1982-2000 ===
Upon graduating college, Milenthal moved to Tampa, Florida to work for the Louis Benito Advertising, which heldMcDonald's, Paramount Pictures, General Telephone of Florida and Circus World accounts. Milenthal spent a year there before moving back to Columbus to work as an account executive for Hameroff/Milenthal/Spence, the ad agency his older brother David Milenthal co-founded in 1954.

In 1988, Milenthal co-founded the agency Family Vacation Services with his brother David Milenthal and Paula Spence. Family Vacation Services specialized in "sightseeing guides, computerized trip routing and telephone marketing services for travelers."

Hameroff/Milenthal/Spence rebranded in 1995, calling the company HMS Partners. Richard Milenthal became CEO at HMS in 1997. They expanded to include offices in Cincinnati, Memphis and Miami. HMS was the agency of record on the Carnival Cruise Lines, Kroger’s Company, Florida Lottery accounts.

=== 2001-2007 ===
In 2001, HMS merged with Resource Marketing Inc, led by Nancy Kramer, and Lighthouse Global Network led by Martin J. Beck to create a new advertising agency, 10 Worldwide, with Milenthal being appointed President and Chief Operating Officer. Their intention was to establish “a new breed of marketing organization.” by offering a "range of communications services as well as traditional advertising." Their clients included Deutsche Bank, the Fidelity Investments unit of FMR, Ford Motor, Hewlett-Packard, the Hoover unit of Maytag, Limited and Sony.

The partnership dissolved a year later and Milenthal created a new agency, 10 United. Its clients included Airborne, American Eagle Outfitters, Anheuser-Busch, Anthem Blue Cross and Blue Shield, DAD’S Pet Care, Dell, Huntington, International Delight, LAND O LAKES Half & Half, Perkins, Pert Plus, Sears Optical, Sure, Time Warner, ZonePerfect and Donato's Pizza.

In 2007, Milenthal became Chief Executive of Engauge Marketing, partnering with Stan Rapp, founder of Rapp Collins, and New York-based Halyard Capital to create Engauge Marketing. Engauge clients included Coca Cola, Chick-fil-A, Cisco, Nike and Nationwide. In 2013, Engauge was acquired by Publicis Groupe.

=== 2013-present ===
Milenthal formed The Shipyard agency in 2013, turning it into a 360 marketing agency across paid, owned, and earned media, maintaining its headquarters in Columbus. Milenthal told Columbus CEO that “I can’t imagine being headquartered anywhere else but Columbus.” Shipyard was composed of two existing agencies, digital marketing firm People to My Site and online-service provider Fugent.

In 2020, Voices of Resilience, hosted by Milenthal, was awarded agency-hosted podcast of the year by AdWeek. Also that year, The Shipyard acquired the advertising agency Mering. In 2023, The Shipyard received almost 60 million dollars from Alaris Equity Partners to expand. In 2024, under Milenthal's leadership, The Shipyard acquired the public relations and ad agency Fahlgren Mortine, and its subsidiary, TURNER, a public relations, social media and digital communications company specializing in travel and lifestyle brands. These mergers extended The Shipyard’s footprint to Cleveland, Dayton, Chicago, Denver, New York City and Boise.

In 2025, The Shipyard acquired the digital marketing agency Tiny Wins, whose client roster included Salesforce, Porsche, Johnson & Johnson and Service Now, as well as bringing its AI capabilities to the agency.

The Shipyard’s client roster includes Visit California, Disney, Airstream, In-N-Out Burger, Donato’s, The Ohio State University, JobsOhio, CLA, Sempra, Johnson & Johnson, VELOZ, San Diego Tourism Authority, San Diego Zoo, American Freight, San Francisco Ballet and Snowbird, a Utah ski resort.

In 2026, Milenthal launched the podcast, Engineering Brand Love.

== Personal ==
Milenthal has been married to Karen Milenthal since 1983. They have three children. Milenthal is also known as "Rick."

In 1990, Milenthal became associate chair of the 1990 Jewish Community Campaign at the Columbia Jewish Federation.

Rick has served as board chair of Marburn Academy, and has been advisor to The Ohio State University’s Neurological Institute helping to reduce suicide among young adults. He is credited as a producer on the films, Women Who Kill, and Serious Moonlight.

=== Mental health advocacy ===
Milenthal has been an advocate for mental health awareness, saying on his podcast, Voices of Resilience, that “in mental health, words matter.” Early in his marriage, Rick's wife Karen lost her father, and in 2018, the son of Milenthal’s Chief Strategy Officer, David Grzelak, took his life. Milenthal became invested in mental health advocacy and awareness. He is a founding partner in the Wonderbus Festival benefiting mental health initiatives in Columbus, which launched in 2019. It featured artists such as Walk The Moon, Ben Harper & The Innocent Criminals, The Revivalists, X Ambassadors, Trombone Shorty, Jenny Lewis, Bishop Briggs and Andrew McMahon in the Wilderness to promote and benefit the Department of Psychiatry & Behavioral Health at the Ohio State University Wexner Medical Center.

Milenthal's partnership with the Ohio State University Wexner Medical Center's Department of Psychiatry & Behavioral Health, extends to a pro-bono agency partnership with SOAR study, a transformational program to uncover the root causes of mental illness, addiction, and resilience.

== External sources ==
- The Shipyard
