= National Organ Transplant Act of 1984 =

American legislation

National Organ Transplant Act
- Long title: An Act To provide for the establishment of the Task Force on Organ Transplantation and the Organ Procurement and Transplantation Network, to authorize financial assistance for organ procurement organizations and other purposes.
- Acronyms (colloquial): NOTA
- Enacted by: the 98th United States Congress
- Effective: October 19, 1984

Citations
- Public law: Pub. L. 98–507
- Statutes at Large: 98 Stat. 2339

Codification
- Titles amended: 42
- U.S.C. sections created: 42 USC § 273, 42 USC § 274

Legislative history
- Introduced in the Senate as the "Organ Procurement and Transplantation Act" S. 2048 by Orrin Hatch (R-UT) on November 3, 1983; Committee consideration by United States Senate Committee on Labor and Human Resources; Passed the Senate on April 11, 1984 (voice vote); Passed the House on June 21, 1984 (voice vote); Reported by the joint conference committee on October 2, 1984; agreed to by the House on October 3, 1984 (voice vote) and by the Senate on October 4, 1984 (voice vote); Signed into law by President Ronald Reagan on October 19, 1984

The National Organ Transplant Act (NOTA) of 1984 is an Act of the United States Congress that created the framework for the organ transplant system in the country. The act provided clarity on the property rights of human organs obtained from deceased individuals and established a public-private partnership known as Organ Procurement and Transplantation Network (OPTN). The OPTN was given the authority to oversee the national distribution of organs.

Since the initial network contract was established in 1986, the United Network for Organ Sharing (UNOS) has acted as the OPTN under the U.S. Department of Health and Human Services. NOTA and subsequent regulations mandate that the OPTN prioritize fair patient access to transplantation while relying on objective medical evidence and adapting to advancements in clinical practices and scientific knowledge.

== History ==
Before the enactment of the National Organ Transplant Act NOTA was put in place, there was no clear jurisdiction on what property rights were for a human corpse. Instead, America applied a "quasi-right" to a corpse. This meant that the relatives were allowed to decide on burial or disposal. However, this did not grant them the right to transfer or sell organs and tissues, preventing the commercialization of human remains.

Due to a shortage of organs and a growing demand for transplants, people began to use other means to purchase organs outside of a hospital setting; the organ market began to become a commercial market. H. Barry Jacobs, the head of a Virginia company, announced in 1983 a plan to buy and sell human organs on the market. This plan put healthy human kidneys in the price range of up to $10,000 plus a $2,000 to $5,000 commission fee for Jacobs. NOTA was a response to this proposal, making it criminal to transfer human organs for valuable consideration for human transplantation.

At the time NOTA was passed, there was an 80% survival rate for kidney transplants. A new drug, cyclosporin, had also increased the survival rate of liver transplant patients from 35% to 70% in a patient's first year after undergoing a liver transplant. The legislation was aware of a growing need and growing organ shortage when NOTA was passed.

NOTA prohibited compensating organ donors but allowed payment for other types of donations, such as human plasma, sperm, and egg cells. Although bone marrow is not classified as an organ, the act also made compensation for bone marrow donation illegal. At the time of its passage, bone marrow donation was a painful and risky procedure. In the years after the act was passed, a new procedure (apheresis) made it possible to harvest bone marrow cells through a non-surgical procedure similar to blood donation. In 2009, a public interest law firm (The Institute for Justice) sued to allow donors to be compensated for giving bone marrow. The firm argued that the development of apheresis meant that donors who gave bone marrow through blood donation should be allowed to receive compensation. The organization predicted that allowing compensation would increase the pool of available donors, and claimed that 3,000 Americans die each year while waiting for compatible marrow donors. Critics argued that allowing compensation could reduce donation, increase the risk of disease, and lead to the exploitation of the poor. In December 2011, the Ninth Circuit Court of Appeals unanimously ruled that donors giving bone marrow via apheresis were eligible for compensation. In November 2013, the federal government proposed a regulation that would change legal definitions to cover bone marrow regardless of how it is obtained. This would have the effect of keeping the ban on compensating donors in place. However, the proposal was later withdrawn.

== Sections of NOTA ==
=== Title I - Task Force on Organ Procurement and Transplantation ===
Title I states the Secretary of Health and Human Services will establish a Task Force on Organ Procurement and Transplantation to regulate how deceased donor organs are handled and who receives transplantations and the process one must go through in regards to a deceased donor organ transplantation along with other lines of duty. This Task Force is composed of 25 members.

Duties of the Task Force include:

- handling all medical, legal, ethical, economic, and social issues that may arise from obtaining deceased human organs and the transplantation of them.
- assessing immunosuppressive medication used to prevent organ rejection in transplant patients, including safety, effectiveness, costs, insurance reimbursements, and making sure those who need these drugs can receive them
- prepare a report including assessments of public and private efforts to obtain deceased human organs, problems in obtaining these organs, recommendations for education and training of health professionals, and for education of the general public
- assessment of the effectiveness of establishing a national registry of deceased human organ donors

=== Title II - Organ Procurement Activities ===
Title II established the Organ Procurement Organizations (OPO) for deceased organ transplants. These OPOs are designed to increase the number of registered deceased organ donors and when those donors become available, they coordinate the donation process from donor to patient.

Additionally, NOTA created the Organ Procurement and Transplantation Network (OPTN), composed of transplant-related individuals and organizations, primarily transplant centers. The United Network for Organ Sharing (UNOS), a private non-profit based in Richmond, Virginia, currently administers the OPTN under the Health Resources and Services Administration (HRSA) of the U.S. Department of Health and Human Services.

The OPTN’s responsibilities include:

- Facilitating the matching and placement of deceased organs through a 24/7 Organ Center.
- Developing consensus-based policies for organ recovery, distribution, and transportation.
- "Collecting and managing scientific data on organ donation and transplantation."
- Providing data to government entities, the public, researchers, and the Scientific Registry of Transplant Recipients to enhance organ allocation and transplantation.
- Maintaining a secure web-based system for managing the national deceased organ transplant waiting list and recipient/donor characteristics.
- Educating professionals and the public about donation, transplantation, and the critical need for organ donors.

Moreover, the Act introduced a Federal Registry that documents all organ transplant recipients, encompassing patient information and transplant procedures.

=== Title III - Prohibition of Organ Purchases ===
NOTA specifically states "It shall be unlawful for any person to knowingly acquire, receive, or otherwise transfer any human organ for valuable consideration for use in human transplantation if the transfer affects interstate commerce." The penalty for breaking this law is a fine of $50,000 up to five years in prison, or both.

=== Title IV - Miscellaneous ===
NOTA created a "national registry of voluntary bone marrow donors." Donors on this list have given informed consent and their names are kept confidential. This registry is upheld by the Secretary of Health and Human Services.

== Amendments ==
=== 1988 ===
The 1988 Amendment of NOTA introduced the Organ Procurement Organizations and Organ Procurement and Transplantation Network explained in detail in Title II of NOTA.

=== 1990 ===
The 1990 Amendment of NOTA introduced the Federal Registry.
