= Fahlgren Mortine =

American advertising agency

- Type: Public Relations Firm; Advertising Agency; Digital Agency
- Industry: Communications
- Founded: 1962; 64 years ago
- Founder: H. Smoot Fahlgren
- Headquarters: Columbus, Ohio
- Key people: Neil Mortine (CEO)
- Products: Public relations, advertising, digital
- Revenue: Approximately $30 million in 2019
- Owner: The Shipyard (2024–present)
- Number of employees: 171

Fahlgren Mortine is an advertising agency in the United States. Its headquarters is in Columbus, Ohio, with regional offices in Dayton and Cleveland, Ohio; Boise, Idaho and Charleston, West Virginia. Through subsidiary TURNER, Fahlgren Mortine also has a presence in Chicago, Illinois; New York City and Denver, Colorado.

== History ==
=== Founding and early expansion ===
H. Smoot Fahlgren founded Fahlgren & Associates in Parkersburg, West Virginia, in 1962. After expansion through West Virginia and Pittsburgh, Pa., the company merged with the advertising agency owned by Cincinnati-based David Ferris in 1970 to create Fahlgren & Ferris. From there, expansion continued to Philadelphia, Toledo, Columbus, Washington, D.C., New York City and Atlanta.

=== Acquisitions ===
Fahlgren & Ferris and Swink Advertising merged to form Fahlgren & Swink on July 1, 1984. The merged companies together acquired Atlanta-based Nucifora & Associates.

In October 1988, Fahlgren & Swink was acquired by Lintas New York Inc., a subsidiary of The Interpublic Group of Companies. At the time, Fahlgren had offices in Parkersburg, W. Va.; Atlanta; Cincinnati, Cleveland, Columbus and Toledo, Ohio; Greensboro, N.C., and Tampa.

When Interpublic acquired another company, Ammirati & Puris, which was the lead national creative agency for Burger King, the conflict with Fahlgren client McDonald's presented the opportunity for the company to buy itself back from the holding company, again becoming an independent company.

In 1989, Fahlgren & Swink acquired Florida-based Benito Advertising, which had offices in Tampa, Orlando and Jacksonville and handled multiple Florida co-ops of McDonald's. The resulting company was named Fahlgren & Swink/Benito.

In May 1990, Fahlgren & Swink bought Hawley & Martin and became known as Fahlgren & Martin, with David N. Martin serving as chairman.

In 1993, Fahlgren Martin sold Hawley Martin to Arnold Fortuna Lawner & Cabot, again becoming known as Fahlgren.

=== 2009-present ===
In 2009, Neil Mortine was named CEO of Fahlgren.

Throughout 2010, Fahlgren Mortine completed three acquisitions, beginning in January with the acquisition of Cleveland, Ohio-based Edward Howard & Co., followed in March by the acquisition of Columbus, Ohio-based GRIP Technology, and, finally, in November with the acquisition of certain assets of Sabatino/Day of Dayton, Ohio.

In 2010, Fahlgren celebrated 35 years as agency of record for McDonald's co-ops, having previously handled advertising and public relations for several in Ohio and Florida. On March 29, 2011, Fahlgren announced it was changing its name to Fahlgren Mortine to honor the company's advertising and public relations founders.

On May 14, 2024, The Shipyard completed its purchase of the Ohio-based advertising agency.

== Current operations and clients ==
- MedStar Health
- McDonald's
- Panama City Beach CVB
- West Virginia Lottery
- Emerson
- Liebert Corporation
- Elmer's Products
- Worthington Industries
- Kroger

== Awards ==
In 2007, Fahlgren Mortine Public Relations, in partnership with the Fraternal Order of Eagles, won the Silver Anvil Award of Excellence, sponsored by the Public Relations Society of America, and won PRSA Bronze Anvil Awards in partnerships with the Ohio Tourism Division and Columbus Blue Jackets Foundation.

In 2008, Fahlgren Mortine Public Relations again won the Silver Anvil Award of Excellence, this time in partnership with Worthington Industries, and won another Bronze Anvil Award for the Ohio Tourism Division media relations program.

In 2010, Fahlgren Mortine was awarded two national ADDY Awards from the American Advertising Federation. The two winning entries were "Word Game" and "Picture Game" from the 2009 NAPA NASCAR TV campaign.

In 2010, Fahlgren Mortine's media relations program with the Ohio Tourism Division, "Discover Ohio Deals", was awarded the U.S. Travel Association's Mercury Award for the best Public and Media Relations program for a state or territory tourism office nationwide.

In 2010, "Changing the Meaning of 'Organ Donor' Among Motorcyclists," conducted in partnership with Lifeline of Ohio, received a Silver Anvil from PRSA in the public service category. (20) "Bringing Logic to the Data Center Energy Discussion," planned and executed in partnership with Emerson Network Power, received a Silver Anvil Award of Excellence in the Brand/Reputation Management category.

In 2011, two Fahlgren Mortine public relations campaigns were awarded SABRE Awards from The Holmes Report: the media relations program with Ohio Tourism Division, "Discover Ohio Deals", and the not-for-profit program with Lifeline of Ohio, "Live On. Ride On."

In September 2011, Fahlgren Mortine was named the Bulldog Reporter's Gold Small Agency of the Year in the category of agencies with revenue between $5 and $10 million.
