= Lifeline of Ohio =

U.S. organ procurement organization

Lifeline of Ohio is one of four organ procurement organizations (OPOs) in the state of Ohio designated by the Centers for Medicare and Medicaid Services of the United States Department of Health and Human Services to facilitate organ and tissue donation. As a licensed tissue bank, Lifeline of Ohio's tissue recovery services are regulated by the Food and Drug Administration (FDA). Lifeline of Ohio is also a member of the United Network for Organ Sharing (UNOS), a government-chartered nationwide network operating under the United States Department of Health and Human Services.

Accredited by the American Association of Tissue Banks and the Association of Organ Procurement Organizations, Lifeline of Ohio serves 37 counties in central and southeastern Ohio along with Wood and Hancock counties in West Virginia. Lifeline of Ohio has both clinical and non-clinical staff who promote and coordinate organ and tissue donation.
