= International organ donor rates =

Organ donation rates vary widely by country and region. The tables document the effective organ donor designation rate and deceased donors per million in the United States and abroad.

== United States ==
Organ donor designation in the United States (2013 figures)
USPS	State	Flag	Population (2009)	% Donors (18+)	DMV Sign-up Rate	Source
AL	Alabama	(Alabama)	3,697,617	61%		
AK	Alaska	(Alaska)	544,349	80%		
AZ	Arizona	(Arizona)	4,932,361	42%	17.2%	
AR	Arkansas	(Arkansas)	2,238,250	58%		
CA	California	(California)	28,801,211	34%	25.5%	
CO	Colorado	(Colorado)	3,956,224	67%	64.4%	
CT	Connecticut	(Connecticut)	2,757,082	41%	36.6%	
DE	Delaware	(Delaware)	766,884	48%		
DC	District of Columbia	(Washington, D.C.)	522,843	45%	33.9%	
FL	Florida	(Florida)	15,315,088	45%		
GA	Georgia	(Georgia (U.S. state))	7,429,820	59%		
HI	Hawaii	(Hawaii)	1,089,302	54%	41.4%	
ID	Idaho	(Idaho)	1,169,075	61%		
IL	Illinois	(Illinois)	9,811,190	53%	35.6%	
IN	Indiana	(Indiana)	4,945,857	69%		
IA	Iowa	(Iowa)	2,351,233	73%	62.8%	
KS	Kansas	(Kansas)	2,161,601	43%		
KY	Kentucky	(Kentucky)	3,362,177	38%	25.9%	
LA	Louisiana	(Louisiana)	3,484,090	61%	51.2%	
ME	Maine	(Maine)	1,063,274	55%		
MD	Maryland	(Maryland)	4,540,763	52%	44.2%	
MA	Massachusetts	(Massachusetts)	5,244,729	50%		
MI	Michigan	(Michigan)	7,616,490	39%	12.7%	
MN	Minnesota	(Minnesota)	4,102,991	62%		
MS	Mississippi	(Mississippi)	2,239,593	24%		
MO	Missouri	(Missouri)	4,618,513	67%	36.3%	
MT	Montana	(Montana)	783,161	82%	62.4%	
NE	Nebraska	(Nebraska)	1,392,120	49%	43.2%	
NV	Nevada	(Nevada)	2,095,348	40%		
NH	New Hampshire	(New Hampshire)	1,045,878	41%		
NJ	New Jersey	(New Jersey)	7,252,127	33%		
NM	New Mexico	(New Mexico)	1,571,096	62%		
NY	New York	(New York (state))	15,307,107	20%	11.1%	
NC	North Carolina	(North Carolina)	7,465,545	58%	51.6%	
ND	North Dakota	(North Dakota)	545,020	66%		
OH	Ohio	(Ohio)	8,880,551	59%	54.6%	
OK	Oklahoma	(Oklahoma)	2,877,457	64%		
OR	Oregon	(Oregon)	3,038,729	74%	37.4%	
PA	Pennsylvania	(Pennsylvania)	9,787,464	46%	45.1%	
RI	Rhode Island	(Rhode Island)	833,818	50%		
SC	South Carolina	(South Carolina)	3,643,633	29%	49.3%	
SD	South Dakota	(South Dakota)	629,185	55%		
TN	Tennessee	(Tennessee)	4,962,227	36%	30.3%	
TX	Texas	(Texas)	19,073,564	17%		
UT	Utah	(Utah)	1,967,315	69%	51.3%	
VT	Vermont	(Vermont)	502,060	5%		
VA	Virginia	(Virginia)	6,329,130	57%	33.1%	
WA	Washington	(Washington (state))	5,312,045	78%	56.7%	
WV	West Virginia	(West Virginia)	1,471,372	35%		
WI	Wisconsin	(Wisconsin)	4,408,841	58%		
WY	Wyoming	(Wyoming)	440,922	60%	55.4%	

== Global summary ==
Organ donor rate per million by country

Organ donor designation internationally
Flag	Country	Consent	Number of deceased donors, per million of population	Population	Source
(Argentina)	Argentina		19.60	43,590,368	
(Armenia)	Armenia		0	2,925,000	
(Australia)	Australia	Opt-in	21.60	24,637,000	
(Austria)	Austria	Opt-out	23.88	8,747,000	
(Azerbaijan)	Azerbaijan		0	9,725,000	
(Bahrain)	Bahrain		4	1,425,000	
(Bangladesh)	Bangladesh		0	162,000,000	
(Belarus)	Belarus		26.20	9,481,000	
(Belgium)	Belgium	Opt-out	30.30	11,299,000	
(Bolivia)	Bolivia		0.36	8,500,000	
(Bosnia and Herzegovina)	Bosnia		0.9	3,856,181	
(Brazil)	Brazil		18.10	206,081,432	
(Brunei)	Brunei		0	423,000	
(Canada)	Canada		21.87	36,000,000	
(Chile)	Chile		10.4	17,948,000	
(China)	China		0.6	1.4×10^{9}	
(Colombia)	Colombia		8.40	47,661,787	
(Costa Rica)	Costa Rica		6.60	4,857,490	
(Croatia)	Croatia	Opt-out	34.63	4,200,000	
(Cuba)	Cuba		12.30	11,200,000	
(Cyprus)	Cyprus	Tacit	6.86	855,000	
(Czech Republic)	Czech Republic	Tacit	27.14	10,543,000	
(Denmark)	Denmark	Opt-in	17.18	5,885,099	
(Dominican Republic)	Dominican Republic		2.20	10,000,000	
(Ecuador)	Ecuador		7.78	14,483,499	
(Egypt)	Egypt		0	95,000,000	
(El Salvador)	El Salvador		0	6,345,000	
(Estonia)	Estonia	Tacit	18.87	1,316,000	
(Ethiopia)	Ethiopia		0	106,993,403	
(Finland)	Finland	Opt-out	26.23	5,509,984	
(France)	France	Opt-out	33.25	65,800,000	
(Georgia (country))	Georgia		0	3,925,000	
(Germany)	Germany	Opt-in	11.20	80,925,031	
(Greece)	Greece	Tacit	5.5	11,359,000	
(Guatemala)	Guatemala		0.38	11,700,000	
(Hong Kong)	Hong Kong		3.86	7,347,000	
(Hungary)	Hungary	Tacit	18.42	9,932,000	
(Iceland)	Iceland	Opt-out	19.29	346,750	
(India)	India		0.52	1.24×10^{9}	
(Iran)	Iran		14.34	81,000,000	
(Republic of Ireland)	Ireland	Opt-out	17.35	4,585,400	
(Israel)	Israel	Opt-in	10.80	8,192,000	
(Italy)	Italy	Opt-out	24.70	59,700,000	
(Japan)	Japan		0.99	126,574,000	
(Jordan)	Jordan		0.21	9,456,000	
(Kuwait)	Kuwait		6.75	4,000,000	
(Latvia)	Latvia	Tacit	9.90	1,971,000	
(Lebanon)	Lebanon		0.89	6,007,000	
(Libya)	Libya		0	6,293,000	
(Lithuania)	Lithuania	Tacit	18.60	3,000,000	
(Luxembourg)	Luxembourg	Tacit	8.33	576,000	
(North Macedonia)	Macedonia		1.43	2,062,294	
(Malaysia)	Malaysia		0.53	31,624,264	
(Malta)	Malta		25	429,000	
(Mexico)	Mexico		4.45	128,600,000	
(Moldova)	Moldova		4.10	3,557,600	
(Morocco)	Morocco		0.09	35,000,000	
(Netherlands)	Netherlands	Tacit	14.93	16,925,000	
(New Zealand)	New Zealand		15	4,661,000	
(Nicaragua)	Nicaragua		0.32	6,150,000	
(Norway)	Norway	Opt-out	21.48	5,258,317	
(Pakistan)	Pakistan		0	193,000,000	
(Panama)	Panama		4.29	4,034,000	
(Paraguay)	Paraguay		1.88	6,800,000	
(Peru)	Peru		2.28	26,700,000	
(Philippines)	Philippines		0.09	103,000,000	
(Poland)	Poland	Tacit	13.10	38,612,000	
(Portugal)	Portugal	Tacit	33.80	10,427,301	
(Puerto Rico)	Puerto Rico		26.30	3,800,000	
(Qatar)	Qatar		2.96	2,570,000	
(Romania)	Romania	Tacit	4.39	20,000,000	
(Russia)	Russia	Tacit	5.14	146,000,000	
(Saudi Arabia)	Saudi Arabia		3.77	32,000,000	
(Singapore)	Singapore		0	5,622,000	
(Slovakia)	Slovak Republic	Tacit	17.96	5,444,000	
(Slovenia)	Slovenia	Tacit	21.14	2,078,000	
(South Africa)	South Africa		1.29	56,000,000	
(South Korea)	South Korea		8.68	50,000,000	
(Spain)	Spain	Opt-out	49.61	46,550,000	
(Sudan)	Sudan		0	39,000,000	
(Sweden)	Sweden	Opt-out	19.19	10,103,843	
(Switzerland)	Switzerland		18.40	8,299,000	
(Taiwan)	Taiwan		4.5	23,550,000	
(Thailand)	Thailand		3.66	68,710,000	
(Trinidad and Tobago)	Trinidad and Tobago		0.72	1,365,000	
(Tunisia)	Tunisia		0.83	10,835,873	
(Turkey)	Turkey	Opt-in	7.54	75,000,000	
(United Arab Emirates)	United Arab Emirates		1.10	9,270,000	
(Ukraine)	Ukraine		0.1	44,000,000	
(United Kingdom)	United Kingdom	Opt-in (England and Wales Opt-out)	24.88	64,716,000	
(Uruguay)	Uruguay		22.86	3,444,000	
(United States)	United States	Opt-in	36.88	322,000,000	
(Venezuela)	Venezuela		0	31,000,000	
(Vietnam)	Vietnam		0	94,000,000	
