= John C. McDonald =

American surgeon and educator

John C. McDonald, M.D. (July 25, 1930 – December 31, 2011) was an American surgeon and educator distinguished in the field of organ transplantation.

== Early life and education ==
McDonald was born on July 25, 1930, in Baldwyn, Mississippi, to Ethel Knight and Edgar McDonald. McDonald received a Bachelor of Science degree from Mississippi College in 1951 and a Doctor of Medicine (M.D.) degree from Tulane University School of Medicine in New Orleans in 1955. He did an internship at the Confederate Memorial Medical Center, now Louisiana State University Medical Center, in Shreveport, Louisiana, then he served in the United States Air Force for two years at McGuire Air Force Base in New Jersey. He then did a general surgery residency at the State University of New York at Buffalo in 1963, staying on as a faculty member in that institution between 1963 and 1968. He was head of the organ transplant section between 1966 and 1968.

He married then nursing student, Martha Dennis, in 1956 while in Shreveport, Louisiana.

== Academic career ==
He was a surgery faculty member at Tulane University School of Medicine from 1968 to 1977. He then became Professor and Chairman of the Department of Surgery at the Louisiana State University Medical Center in Shreveport. Not being an adequate hospital for organ transplantation, in 1989, he led the affiliation of the Willis-Knighton Medical Center as the primary hospital for the transplantation program.

In 2000, McDonald was appointed Chancellor of the LSU Health Sciences Center at Shreveport and Dean of the School of Medicine in Shreveport. Under his direction, the surgery residency program went from a pyramidal program, where a certain number of resident physicians would be fired, leading to five resident physicians finishing the surgery residency to where only five incoming resident physicians were accepted each year.

Dr. McDonald held the offices of President of the United Network for Organ Sharing and the American Society of Transplant Surgeons.

=== Organ transplantation ===
He was a recipient of the Roswell Park Medal for recognition in surgery. The Southern Surgical Association awarded him its highest honor, Honorary Fellow.

== Aftermath ==
He retired on January 1, 2009. His name is used as the alumni association, the John C. McDonald Surgical Society as of 2003. The association was previously known as the Shreveport Surgical Society, for which he was a founding member in 1979. McDonald was given the title of Chancellor Emeritus and Dean Emeritus.
