= Organ procurement organization =

In the United States, an organ procurement organization (OPO) is a non-profit organization that is responsible for the evaluation and procurement of deceased-donor organs for organ transplantation. There are 55 such organizations in the United States, each responsible for organ procurement in a specific region, and each a member of the Organ Procurement and Transplantation Network (OPTN), a federally-mandated network managed by the United Network for Organ Sharing (UNOS) under federal contract. The individual OPOs represent the front line of organ procurement, having direct contact with the donor's hospital and the family of the recently deceased donor. Once the OPO receives authorization for donation from the decedent's family or through first-person authorization (such as a state or national Donor Registry), it works with UNOS to identify the best candidates for the available organs, and coordinates with the surgical team for each organ recipient.

OPOs are also charged with educating the public to increase awareness of and participation in the organ donation process.

== List of OPOs ==
All organ procurement organizations in the United States are members, by law, of the Organ Procurement and Transplantation Network (administered by the United Network for Organ Sharing, and most are also members of the Association of Organ Procurement Organizations (AOPO). Many of the OPOs are also members of Donate Life America. Some OPOs are affiliated with hospitals and are not considered independent.

Name	Region served
Legacy Of Hope	Alabama
Arkansas Regional Organ Recovery Agency	Arkansas
Carolina Donor Services	North Carolina, Virginia
Center for Donation and Transplant	Massachusetts, New York, Vermont
Center for Organ Recovery & Education	New York, Pennsylvania, West Virginia
Donor Alliance	Colorado, Wyoming
Donor Network of Arizona	Arizona
Donor Network West	California, Nevada
Finger Lakes Donor Recovery Network	New York
Gift of Hope Organ & Tissue Donor Network	Illinois, Indiana
Gift of Life Michigan	Michigan
Gift of Life Donor Program	Delaware, New Jersey, Pennsylvania
Sierra Donor Services	California
Indiana Donor Network	Indiana
Infinite Legacy	Maryland, Virginia, Washington, D.C.
DonorConnect	Idaho, Nevada, Utah, Wyoming
Iowa Donor Network	Iowa, Nebraska
Kentucky Organ Donor Affiliates	Kentucky, Indiana, Ohio, West Virginia
Legacy of Life Hawaii	Hawaii
Life Center Northwest	Alaska
Life Choice Donor Services	Connecticut, Massachusetts
Life Connection of Ohio	Ohio
LifeAlliance Organ Recovery Agency	Florida
LifeBanc	Ohio
LifeCenter Northwest	Idaho, Alaska, Montana, Washington
LifeCenter Organ Donor Network	Kentucky, Indiana, Ohio
LifeGift Organ Donation Center	Texas
LifeLink of Florida	Florida
LifeLink of Georgia	Georgia, South Carolina
LifeLink of Puerto Rico	Puerto Rico, U.S. Virgin Islands
LifeNet Health	North Carolina, Virginia, West Virginia
LifePoint	South Carolina
LifeQuest Organ Recovery Services	Florida
LifeShare of Oklahoma	Oklahoma
LifeShare of the Carolinas	North Carolina, South Carolina
LifeSharing	California
LifeSource Upper Midwest Organ Procurement Organization	Minnesota, North Dakota, South Dakota, Wisconsin
Lifeline of Ohio Organ Procurement Agency	Ohio, West Virginia
Louisiana Organ Procurement Agency	Louisiana
Mid-America Transplant	Arkansas, Missouri, Illinois
Mid-South Transplant Foundation	Arkansas, Mississippi, Tennessee
Midwest Transplant Network	Kansas, Missouri
Nebraska Organ Recovery System	Nebraska, Iowa
Nevada Donor Network	Nevada
New England Donor Services	Connecticut, Maine, Massachusetts, New Hampshire, Rhode Island, Vermont
New Jersey Organ & Tissue Sharing Network	New Jersey
New Mexico Donor Services	New Mexico
New York Organ Donor Network	New York, Pennsylvania
OneLegacy	California
Mississippi Organ Recovery Agency	Mississippi
Cascade Life Alliance	Idaho, Oregon, Washington
Southwest Transplant Alliance	Texas
Tennessee Donor Services	Tennessee, Georgia, Kentucky, Virginia
Texas Organ Sharing Alliance	Texas
TransLife/Florida Hospital	Florida
University of Wisconsin Organ and Tissue Donation	Illinois, Upper Peninsula of Michigan, Minnesota, Wisconsin
Upstate New York Transplant Services	New York
Wisconsin Donor Network	Wisconsin
