= Gotai =

Japanese cultural practice

Gotai (五体) is a Japanese cultural practice regarding the intactness of the body, both in life and death, and has its roots in Confucianism. It is believed that the soul is directly influenced by the welfare of the body, and alteration to the body will directly influence or disrupt the soul.

The notion is the basis for much of the Japanese reluctance to use implants or have surgery, to the point that earrings are traditionally frowned upon.
