= United Network for Organ Sharing =

American non-profit organization

- Abbreviation: UNOS
- Founded: March 21, 1984; 42 years ago
- Founder: Gene A. Pierce
- Tax ID no.: 54-1327878
- Legal status: 501(c)(3) nonprofit organization
- Headquarters: Richmond, Virginia, U.S.
- Coordinates: 37.547899°N 77.434782°W
- Services: Manages the U.S. organ transplant system under contract with the federal government by bringing together transplant and organ procurement professionals and volunteers in order to make life-saving organ transplants possible.
- Chief Executive Officer: Brian Shepard
- President: David Mulligan, MD, PhD
- Subsidiaries: UNOS Foundation _{(501(c)(3))}
- Revenue: $57,665,464 (2016)
- Expenses: $51,727,331 (2016)
- Employees: 394 (2015)
- Volunteers: 500 (2015)
- Website: unos.org

The United Network for Organ Sharing (UNOS) is a non-profit scientific and educational organization that administers the only Organ Procurement and Transplantation Network (OPTN) in the United States, established under the National Organ Transplant Act of 1984 by Gene A. Pierce, founder of United Network for Organ Sharing. Located in Richmond, Virginia, the organization's headquarters are situated near the intersection of Interstate 95 and Interstate 64 in the Virginia BioTechnology Research Park.

== Activities ==
United Network for Organ Sharing is involved in many aspects of the organ transplant and donation process:

- Managing the national transplant waiting list, matching donors to recipients.
- Maintaining the database that contains all organ transplant data for every transplant event that occurs in the U.S.
- Bringing together members to develop policies that make the best use of the limited supply of organs and give all patients a fair chance at receiving the organ they need, regardless of age, sex, ethnicity, religion, lifestyle, or financial/social status.
- Monitoring every organ match to ensure organ allocation policies are followed.
- Providing assistance to patients, family members and friends.
- Educating transplant professionals about their important role in the donation and transplant processes.
- Educating the public about the importance of organ donation.

== History ==
United Network for Organ Sharing was awarded the initial Organ Procurement and Transplantation Network contract on September 30, 1986, and it is the only organization to ever manage the Organ Procurement and Transplantation Network.

United Network for Organ Sharing provides the Organ Procurement and Transplantation Network with a functional, effective management system incorporating the Board of Directors, committees and regional membership to operate OPTN elements and activities.

In late December 2013, it was announced that United Network for Organ Sharing had developed new policies and regulations governing the new field of hand and face transplants like it does standard organ transplants, giving more Americans who are disfigured by injury or illness a chance at reconstruction. In July 2014, government regulations went into effect making hand and face transplants subject to the same oversight by United Network for Organ Sharing as heart or kidney transplants. The rules mean potential transplant recipients will be added to the United Network for Organ Sharing network, for matching of donated hands and face tissue to ensure correct tissue type and compatibility for skin color, size, gender and age. Transplants and their outcomes will be tracked.

In 2020, the Senate Finance Committee launched a bipartisan investigation into UNOS, seeking information into various abuses and patient harms. In 2022, the committee published a bipartisan report concluding that "From the top down, the U.S. transplant network is not working, putting Americans’ lives at risk.". UNOS has also come under intense scrutiny for issues related to outdated and insecure technology, as well as failing to address fatal patient safety risks and anti-patient misinformation.

An investigation by the United States Senate Committee on Finance published in August 2022 catalogs over a thousand complaints from the previous decade, including patient deaths and injuries caused by failures to check for disease and match blood type. At an oversight hearing, Senator Elizabeth Warren pointed out that "UNOS is 15 times more likely to lose or damage an organ in transit as an airline is to lose or damage your luggage." Temperature regulation during transport can also be problematic.

== Regions ==
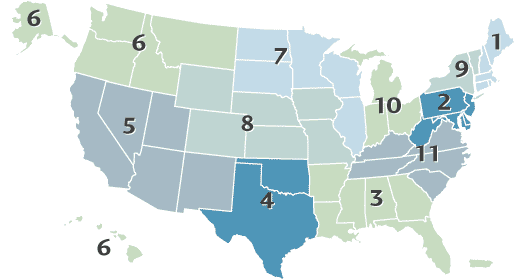
The regions of United Network for Organ Sharing

United Network for Organ Sharing and Organ Procurement and Transplantation Network operate by grouping states into several different regions throughout the country.

1. Connecticut, Maine, Massachusetts, New Hampshire, Rhode Island, and Eastern Vermont
2. Delaware, District of Columbia, Maryland, New Jersey, Pennsylvania, West Virginia, and the part of Northern Virginia in the Donation Service Area served by the Washington Regional Transplant Community (DCTC) Organ procurement organization
3. Alabama, Arkansas, Florida, Georgia, Louisiana, Mississippi, and Puerto Rico
4. Oklahoma and Texas
5. Arizona, California, Nevada, New Mexico, and Utah
6. Alaska, Hawaii, Idaho, Montana, Oregon, and Washington
7. Illinois, Minnesota, North Dakota, South Dakota, and Wisconsin
8. Colorado, Iowa, Kansas, Missouri, Nebraska, and Wyoming
9. New York and Western Vermont
10. Indiana, Michigan, and Ohio
11. Kentucky, North Carolina, South Carolina, Tennessee, and most of Virginia

== Allocation ==
United Network for Organ Sharing uses a set policy to remove as much subjectivity as possible from the process of matching organs with recipients (referred to as a "match run"). There are several factors that are involved, including, but not limited to:

- Age
- Ability of the patient to recover
- ABO (though very young recipients are often considered for ABO-incompatible listing)
- Distance
- Height and weight
- Life support status
- Listing status
- Time on the waiting list

The individual criteria varies from one organ type to another. For example, with heart and lung transplantation, candidate recipients are given one of four status levels (1A - the highest level, 1B, 2, and 7). A matching born (i.e. not in utero) candidate of Status 1A within the donor region, of matching ABO type, and within 500 miles will be given the highest priority, with multiple matches being ranked by time on the waiting list. Each of those criteria will be progressively relaxed until a match is found.

Some healthy organs that are donated go to waste despite about 20 people dying per day while on waiting lists. Critics state that this is because once a given set of organs are turned down once or twice, other potential recipients begin to be concerned about the condition of the organs, and eventually the organs are destroyed after thousands of refusals. Excessive conservatism may be the result of evaluating transplant surgeons based on success rate, giving them an incentive only to attempt procedures with the highest probability of success, rather than maximizing the number of lives saved. New rules announced by the Department of Health and Human Services in 2020 aimed to better balance waiting lists in different regions caused by demographic differences in causes of death.

== Membership ==
United Network for Organ Sharing has five classes of members, with varying levels of rights and obligations.

- Institutional members: Regional organ procurement organizations (such as Gift of Hope), hospitals that perform transplantation, or histocompatibility laboratories that serve the aforementioned hospitals.
- Medical/scientific members: Professional organizations whose membership serve the field of transplantation, such as the American Society of Transplant Surgeons or the American Academy of Pediatrics.
- Public organization members: Organizations that serve to support transplant donors, recipients, and their families, such as National Kidney Foundation or the American Diabetes Association, or hospitals that refer donors but do not themselves perform transplants.
- Business members: Companies that do business with two or more institutional members.
- Individual members: Current or former members of the UNOS Board of Directors; Members or family of transplant candidates, donors, recipients; or other individuals who are or were involved in the field of or regulation of organ donation and transplantation, including employees of institutional members.

== Leadership ==
UNOS, and by extension, the OPTN elects its presidents to a one-year term. Prior to serving that term, they serve for one year as Vice President. After their term as President, they then serve for one year as Immediate Past President. This allows for a more orderly transition between leadership.

=== List of UNOS/OPTN Presidents ===
- 1984-1985: G. Melville Williams, MD, Medical College of Virginia
- 1985-1986: Oscar Salvatierra Jr., MD
- 1986-1988: John C. McDonald, MD
- 1988-1989: H. Keith Johnson, MD
- 1989-1990: Robert Corry, MD
- 1990-1991: James S. Wolf, MD
- 1991-1992: Robert Mendez, MD
- 1992-1993: R. Randal Bolinger, MD
- 1993-1994: Douglas J. Norman, MD
- 1994-1995: Margaret D. Allen, MD
- 1995-1996: Bruce A. Lucas, MD
- 1996-1997: James Burdick, MD
- 1997-1998: Lawrence Hunsicker, MD
- 1998-1999: William Pfaff, MD
- 1999-2000: William D. Payne, MD
- 2000-2001: Patricia Adams, MD
- 2001-2002: Jeremiah G. Turcotte, MD, University of Michigan Medical Center
- 2002-2003: Clyde F. Barker, MD
- 2003-2004: Russell Wiesner, MD, Mayo Clinic
- 2004-2005: Robert A. Metzger, MD
- 2005-2006: Francis L. Delmonico, MD, FACS, Harvard Medical School
- 2006-2007: Sue V. McDiarmid, MD, UCLA Medical Center
- 2007-2008: Timothy L. Pruett, MD, University of Minnesota Medical Center
- 2008-2009: Robert S. D. Higgins, MD, Johns Hopkins School of Medicine
- 2009-2010: James Wynn, MD, Medical College of Georgia
- 2010-2011: Charles Alexander, RN, MSN, MBA, CPTC
- 2011-2012: John R. Lake, MD, University of Minnesota Medical Center
- 2012-2013: John P. Roberts, MD, University of California San Francisco Medical Center
- 2013-2014: Kenneth A. Andreoni, MD, Shands Hospital at University of Florida
- 2014-2015: Carl L. Berg, MD, Duke University Hospital
- 2015-2016: Betsy Walsh, JD, MPH, Novant Health
- 2016-2017: Stuart C. Sweet, MD, Washington University in St. Louis School of Medicine
- 2017-2018: Yolanda T. Becker, MD, University of Chicago Medicine
- 2018-2019: Sue Dunn, RN, BSN, Donor Alliance
- 2019-2020: Maryl R. Johnson, MD, FACC, UW School of Health
- 2020-2021: David Mulligan, MD, FACS, Yale School of Medicine
- 2021-2022: Matthew Cooper, MD, FACS, MedStar Georgetown University Hospital
- 2022-2023: Jerry McCauley, MD, MPH, Thomas Jefferson University Hospital
- 2023-2024: Dianne LaPointe Rudow ANP-BC, DNP, FAAN, Mount Sinai Medical Center
- 2024-2025: Richard Formica, MD, Yale New Haven Hospital
- 2025-2026: Lloyd Ratner, MD, MPH, FACS, FICS(Hon), Columbia University
