= Peripheral stem cell transplantation =

Method of replacing blood-forming stem cells

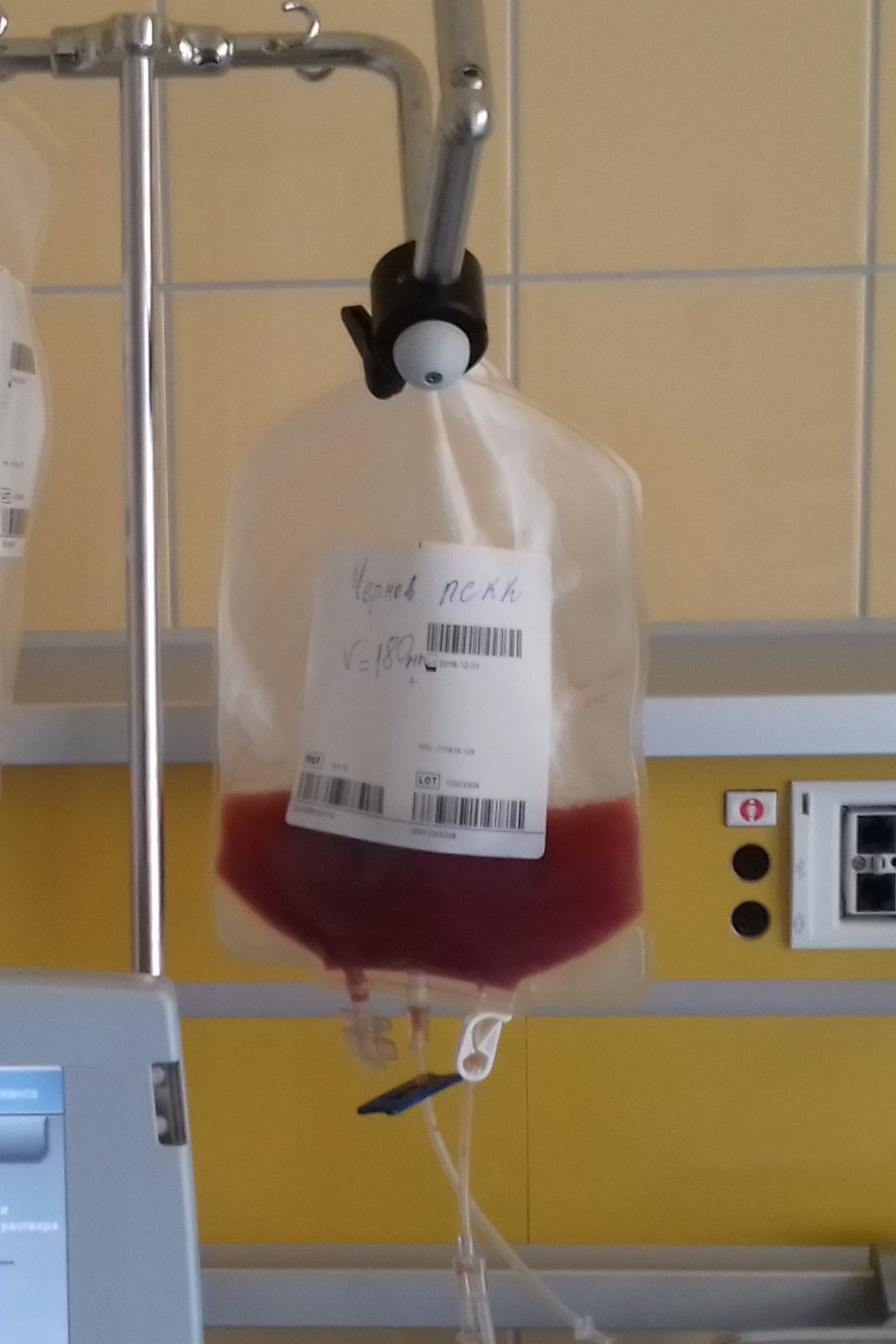
- A bag of freshly transplanted peripheral blood stem cells
- Specialty: Hematology

Peripheral blood stem cell transplantation (PBSCT), also called "Peripheral stem cell support", is a method of replacing blood-forming stem cells. Stem cells can be destroyed through cancer treatments such as chemotherapy or radiation, as well as any blood-related diseases, such as leukemia, lymphoma, neuroblastoma and multiple myeloma. PBSCT is now a much more common procedure than its bone marrow harvest equivalent due to the ease and less invasive nature of the procedure. Studies suggest that PBSCT has a better outcome in terms of the number of hematopoietic stem cell (CD34+ cells) yield.

Immature hematopoietic stem cells in the circulating blood that are similar to those in the bone marrow are collected by apheresis from a donor (PBSC collection). The product is then administered intravenously to the patient after treatment. The administered hematopoietic stem cells then migrate to the recipient's bone marrow, through a process known as stem cell homing, where the transplanted cells override the previous bone marrow. This allows the bone marrow to recover, proliferate and continue producing healthy blood cells.

The transplantation may be autologous (an individual's own blood cells), allogeneic (blood cells donated by someone else with matching HLA), or syngeneic (blood cells donated by an identical twin). The apheresis procedure typically lasts for 4–6 hours, depending on the blood volume of the donor.

== Preparation prior to PBSC Collection ==
Granulocyte colony stimulating factor (GCSF) are naturally occurring glycoproteins that stimulate white blood cell proliferation. Filgrastim is a synthetic form of GCSF produced in E.coli. PBSC donors are given a course of GCSF prior to PBSC collection. The increase in white blood cell proliferation as a result of the Filgrastim ensures a better results from the donation. The course is usually given over a 4-day period prior to PBSC collection. The most common side effects of Filgrastim are bone, joint, back, arm, leg, mouth, throat, and muscle pain. Additionally, headache, nausea, vomiting, dizziness, fatigue, rash, loss of appetite, and difficulty falling or staying asleep are common.

== Complications ==
Since allogeneic PBSCT involves transformation of blood between different individuals, this naturally carries more complications than autologous PBSCT. For example, calculations must be made to ensure consistency in the amount of total blood volume between the donor and recipient. If the total blood volume of the donor is less than that of the recipient (such as when a child is donating to an adult), multiple PBSCT sessions may be required for adequate collection. Performing such a collection in a single setting could result in risks such as hypovolemia, which could lead to cardiac arrest and death. Health care providers must exercise careful precaution when considering donor-recipient matching in allogeneic PBSCT.

== History ==
An early example of a successful peripheral stem cell transplant was carried out in the wake of the 1999 Tokaimura nuclear accident. Hisashi Ouchi, who received the highest dose of radiation was treated with PBSCT in an attempt to restore his destroyed immune system. Cells from the patient's sister's bone marrow were administered, and in the following weeks successfully began dividing and differentiating into white blood cells. However, several weeks later, the cells were found to have been mutated by the radiation still present within the patient's body, and were observed carrying out autoimmune responses. Later studies on the incident and subsequent use of PBSCT found that the transplant had also induced neoendothelialization of the aortic endothelium.
