= Graft (surgery) =

Surgical procedure in which blood-drained tissue is moved between locations or bodies

- MeSH: D019737

Grafting refers to a surgical procedure to move tissue from one site to another on the body, or from another creature, without bringing its own blood supply with it. Instead, a new blood supply grows in after it is placed. A similar technique where tissue is transferred with the blood supply intact is called a flap. In some instances, a graft can be an artificially manufactured device. Examples of this are a tube to carry blood flow across a defect or from an artery to a vein for use in hemodialysis.

== Classification ==
Autografts and isografts are usually not considered as foreign and, therefore, do not elicit rejection. Allografts and xenografts may be recognized as foreign by the recipient and rejected.

- Autograft: graft taken from one part of the body of an individual and transplanted onto another site in the same individual, e.g., skin graft.
- Isograft: graft taken from one individual and placed on another individual of the same genetic constitution, e.g., grafts between identical twins.
- Allograft: graft taken from one individual placed on a genetically non-identical member of the same species.
- Xenograft: graft taken from one individual placed on an individual belonging to another species, e.g., animal to human.

== Types of grafting ==
The term grafting is most commonly applied to skin grafting, however many tissues can be grafted: skin, bone, nerves, tendons, neurons, blood vessels, fat, and cornea are tissues commonly grafted today.

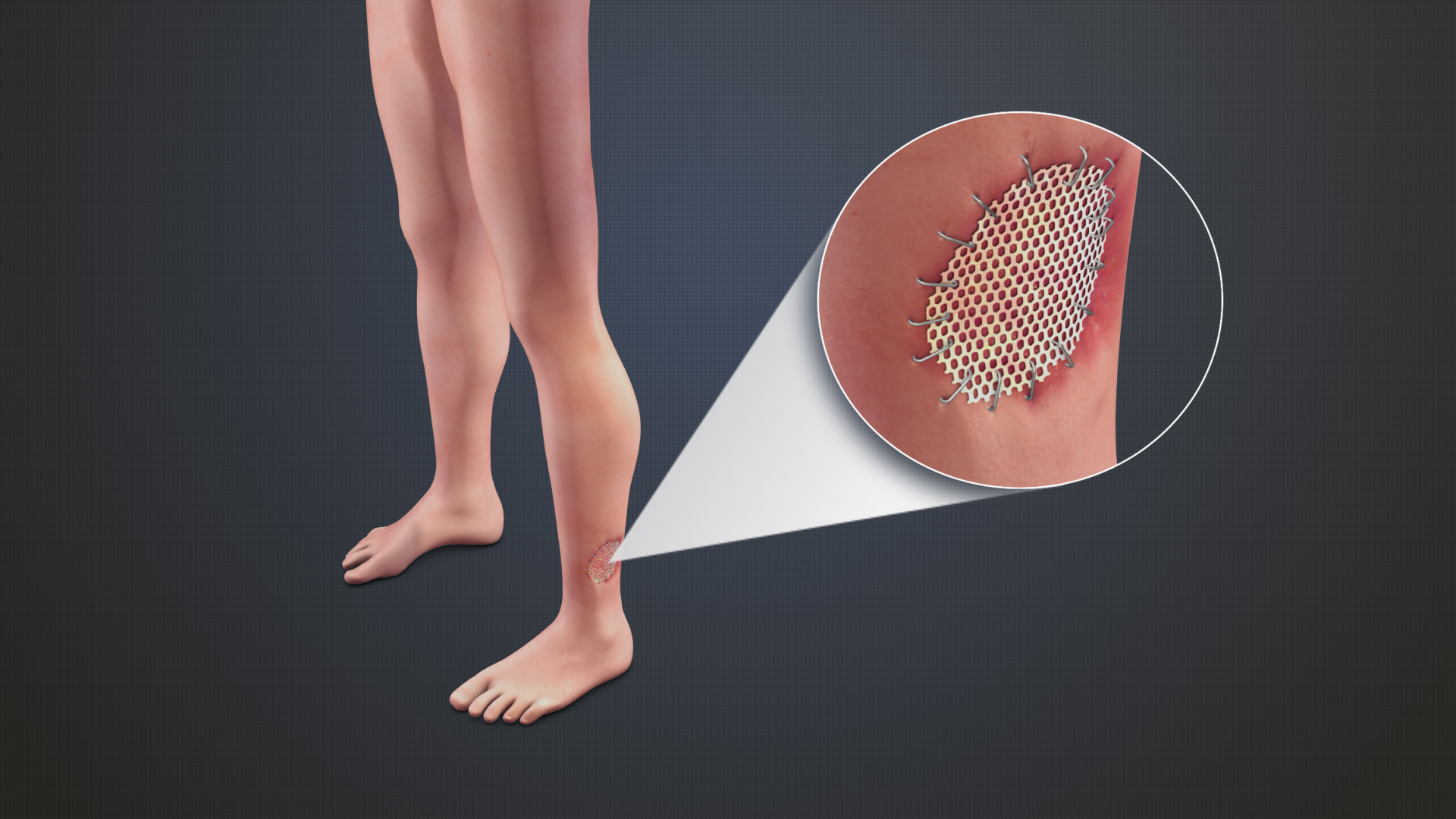
The grafting process places fresh skin over a wound with damaged skin.

Specific types include:

- Skin grafting – often used to treat skin loss due to a wound, burn, infection, or surgery. In the case of damaged skin, it is removed, and new skin is grafted in its place. Skin grafting can reduce the course of treatment and hospitalization needed, and can also improve function and appearance. There are two types of skin grafts:
1. Split-thickness skin grafts (the epidermis and part of the dermis)
2. Full-thickness skin grafts (the epidermis and the entire thickness of the dermis)
- Bone grafting – used in dental implants, as well as other instances. The bone may be autologous, typically harvested from the iliac crest of the pelvis, or banked bone/allograft.
- Vascular grafting – the use of transplanted or prosthetic blood vessels in surgical procedures.
- Ligament grafting repair – as with anterior cruciate ligament reconstruction or ulnar collateral ligament reconstruction.
- Fat grafting – the process of harvesting adipose tissue through liposuction, processing/centrifugation and injection into soft tissue for improving coverage, volume and contour, typically in the breast, buttock and face.

== Indications ==
- Large amount of skin loss due to infections
- Burns
- Skin cancer surgery
- Chronic connective tissue disease

== Reasons for failure ==
- Hematoma development when the graft is placed over an active bleed
- Infection
- Seroma development
- Shear force disrupting growth of new blood supply
- Inappropriate bed for new blood supply to grow from, such as cartilage, tendons, or bone
