= Susan Mackinnon =

Canadian surgeon (born c. 1950)

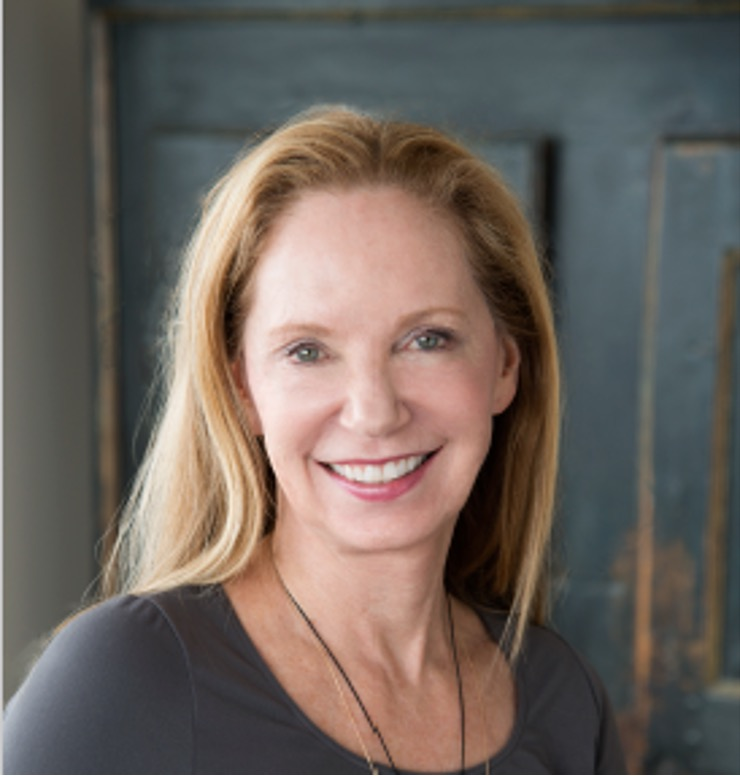
- Born: January 31, 1950 (age 76); New Brunswick, Canada
- Education: Queens University; University of Toronto
- Known for: Nerve allotransplantation
- Awards: American Association of Plastic Surgeons Honorary Award, Jacobson Innovation Award
- Scientific career
- Fields: Plastic and reconstructive surgery
- Workplaces: University of Toronto; Washington University School of Medicine

Susan E. Mackinnon (born c. 1950) is a Canadian plastic and reconstructive surgeon who is a pioneer in the field of peripheral nerve transfer and regeneration. She performed the world's first nerve allotransplantation in 1988. She is a past president of the American Association of Plastic Surgeons, the Plastic Surgery Research Council, and the American Association of Hand Surgery. As of 2022, she is the Minot Packer Fryer Professor of Plastic Surgery at Washington University School of Medicine in St. Louis, United States.

== Early life and education ==
Mackinnon was born in Campbellton, New Brunswick, Canada. She was one of two children, with a younger sister. Her father was a civil engineer, and the family lived in various locations depending on the projects he was involved with, including Toronto's Pearson Airport and Toronto's art museum. Mackinnon's mother also had a college degree, leading to high expectations for both Susan and her sister. Early on, Mackinnon had planned to be a history teacher, but her history teacher dissuaded her. After explaining the importance of going into something practical, and history not being that, Mackinnon decided that taking care of sick people was practical, and moved towards a career in medicine.

After high school, Mackinnon started university at Queens University in Kingston, Ontario, Canada in 1969 where she was in an accelerated pre-medical program. She complete two years of pre-medical education and then entered directly into the Queens University Medical School to complete both her undergraduate degree and medical school in a total of 6 years. Mackinnon met her future husband, G. Alexander Patterson in the accelerated med school program. Mackinnon and Patterson married in 1972 and by the end of medical school in 1975, Mackinnon was 9 months pregnant with her first child. Though she had been planning to pursue a career in neurology, she pivoted towards general surgery, completing a general surgery residency at Queens University until 1978.

Mackinnon then moved to Toronto to complete the rest of her residency training in plastic surgery at the University of Toronto Medical School, where she developed an interest in microsurgery and tissue transplantation. After her residency, she completed her fellowship training in neurosurgery at the University of Toronto in 1981 and then completed another year-long fellowship training experience in hand surgery at the Raymond Curtis Hand Center at the Union Memorial Hospital in Baltimore, Maryland.

== Career and research ==
After her fellowship training, Mackinnon joined the staff at the University of Toronto and began research in the area of nerve regeneration funded by the Medical Research Council of Canada. Through her work, she developed a method that enabled surgeons to use absorbable conduits to enhance nerve regeneration. In 1988, Mackinnon performed the first nerve transplant implanting a nerve from a cadaver into a child's leg. She won the Medal Award in Surgery in 1988 for her surgical skills, research, and innovation in the field of surgery. Mackinnon was then recruited to Washington University School of Medicine in St. Louis in 1991 and became a member of the faculty of the Division of Plastic Surgery. In 1996, Mackinnon assumed the Sydney M. Shoenberg, Jr. and Robert H. Shoenberg Endowed Chair as Professor and Chief, Division of Plastic and Reconstructive Surgery. She held her position as chair until stepping down in 2020.

Throughout her time at Washington University in St. Louis, Mackinnon has contributed to the field of nerve regeneration through leading a laboratory investigating the basic science as well as the translation and clinical sciences of nerve regeneration and allografts. Her research has used the principles of contact guidance to enhance nerve growth across gaps, and her recent work has incorporated the interactions between the neurons and the immune system, such as macrophages, as the immune support of peripheral regeneration is important in surgical success. For example, Mackinnon's recent work in basic science has been exploring the role of macrophages at the site of nerve injury by creating new methods to deliver macrophage depleting agents to specifically explore their role in nerve regeneration. Her group at Washington University has also recently shown that the CCL2/CCR2 macrophage axis is important in nerve regeneration in the context of acellular nerve allografts.

Mackinnon is a fellow of the Royal College of Surgeons (FRCSC) of Canada and a fellow of the American College of Surgeons (FACS) of the United States and Canada.

== Awards and honors ==
- 2022 – American Association of Plastic Surgeons (AAPS) Honorary Award
- 2000–2022 – Castle Connolly Top Doctors List
- 2016 – AAPS Distinguished Fellow Award
- 2013 – Jacobson Innovation Award
- 2012 – AAPS Clinician of the Year Award
- 2012 – AAPS Research Achievement Award in Basic Science
- 2008 – AAPS President
- 2007 – Elected a fellow of the Institute of Medicine of the National Academy of Sciences
- 2003 – Annual Outstanding St. Louis Scientists Awards
- 1998 – James Barrett Brown Award

== Selected publications ==
Mackinnon SE, Hudson AR. Clinical application of peripheral nerve transplantation. Plast Reconstr Surg. 1992 Oct;90(4): 695–9. doi:10.1097/00006534-199210000-00024. PMID 1410009

Mackinnon SE, Patterson GA. Long-term follow-up on the use of soft-tissue expansion for shoulder reconstruction. Ann Plast Surg. 1992 Aug;29(2): 170–2. doi:10.1097/00000637-199208000-00014. PMID 1530270.

Mackinnon SE, Dellon AL. Clinical nerve reconstruction with a bioabsorbable polyglycolic acid tube. Plast Reconstr Surg. 1990 Mar;85(3): 419–24. doi:10.1097/00006534-199003000-00015. PMID 2154831.

Mackinnon SE. New directions in peripheral nerve surgery. Ann Plast Surg. 1989 Mar;22(3): 257–73. doi:10.1097/00000637-198903000-00013. PMID 2660716.

== Personal life ==
Mackinnon married Alec Patterson, a thoracic surgeon at Washington University School of Medicine in St. Louis, in 1972. They have four children.
