= Stem cell fat grafting =

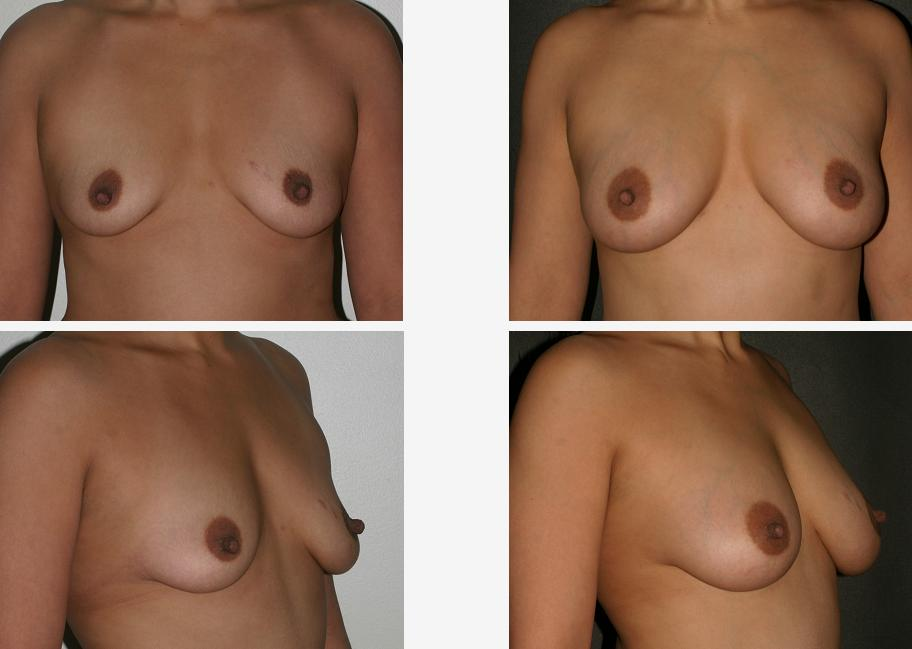
Example of breast augmentation by fat grafting

Stem cell fat grafting is the autotransplantation of adipose-derived stem cells (ADSCs) extracted from fat-abundant donor sites (e.g. thigh or stomach) to other areas such as the face, breast, and hip to reconstruct the operative areas into desirable shapes. ADSCs are multipotent stem cells found in adipose tissues, displaying similar differentiation potentials to bone marrow-derived mesenchymal stem cells (BM-MSCs).

The discovery of ADSCs brought advances to the field of regenerative medicine and aesthetic procedures. While the use of embryonic stem cells was reconsidered for ethical reasons, ADSCs were noticed by plastic surgeons for their characteristics such as pluripotent differentiation potential, paracrine activities, immunomodulatory functions, and homing effect.

Regardless of the numerous benefits, there are few side effects and oncology safety issues. The rising investment in stem cell cosmetic therapy reflects high expectation and demands, especially in South Korea. Further research on the effectiveness of ADSCs grafting proposed that the aftermath of the therapy can be affected by the quality of stem cells and diet by fostering adequate conditions for stem cell growth and sufficient consumption of nutrients.

== History of stem cell plastic surgery ==
James Thomson at the University of Wisconsin first isolated human embryonic stem cells in 1998. However, due to the ethical controversies regarding embryonic stem cells, induced pluripotent stem cells (iPSCs) were proposed as a substitute. The remaining oncological concern of iPSCs was eased by suggesting adult stem cells as the most primary resource of regenerative medicine.

=== Autologous fat grafting ===
The first isolation of mesenchymal stem cells from the bone marrow was done by Friednstein et al. in 1986 and considered as a primary clinical stem cell source. However, the painful acquisition and low cell yield limited further research. Zuk et al. later isolated ADSCs and found them to have the same potential as BM-MSCs. Although later other stem cells were identified from different parts of the human body, ADSCs were considered to be the safest as it was the easiest stem cell to isolate and did not require cell expansion, and so they are still used as a primary source of fat transfer therapies.

The concept of autologous fat grafting was first suggested in 1893. The first report described that the adipose tissue without changing its structure was implanted to the adherent scars from osteomyelitis. The result was successful and soon widely used in different fields of aesthetic procedures such as breast augmentation and rhinoplasties.

In 1978, a liposuction procedure was invented to remove the excessive fat depositions. Later, Illouz found that this procedure is the ideal supplier of fat tissue and used impurified lipoaspirate as a transplant in 1983 and Fournier proposed a reinjection technique of aspirated fat.

The third period started in 1994 when S.R. Coleman introduced the Coleman technique, which uses adipose tissue for lipid cell transfer. The lipoaspirate was centrifuged to separate the stromal vascular fraction (SVF), including ADSCs, from blood, tissue, fluid, and lipids, though the fat cell retention rate varied from 30% to 95%. The first theory that explains graft survival is the Cell Survival Theory, which suggests that the transfer of viable adipocytes for adequate circulation enhances the survival rate and this can be done by developing the processing and injection techniques to minimize trauma.

Host replacement theory suggests that the retention rate after fat grafting is determined by the ADSCs replacing adipocytes, as the successful ADSC activation and replacement of adipocytes is related to the early death of transferred adipocytes in ischemic conditions.

== Mechanisms ==
=== ADSCs ===
Human mesenchymal stem cells

Fang et al. proposed that ADSCs are the most widely used due to their pluripotent differentiation potentials, paracrine activity and immunomodulatory function. ADSCs are one type of mesenchymal stem cells (MSCs), and they exhibit high similarities with BM-MSCs, and they are capable of multilineage differentiation into fats, cartilages, cardiac muscles, nerves, skins, and Skeletal muscles. They also tend to survive for a longer period with a higher proliferative capacity than other stem cells. ADSCs secret pro-angiogenic factors and anti-apoptotic factors like cytokines, chemokines, growth factors, mRNAs, and microRNAs. Then, they act on different systems where they were transplanted and regenerate cells in these transplanted systems. Moreover, as ADSCs resemble BM-MSCs, they have immunosuppressive characteristics that inhibit both innate and adaptive immune systems. However, their capacity is even stronger than BM-MSCs by secretion of immunosuppressive factors such as IL-6 and TGF-B. Additionally, they perform as immune tolerators to suppress lymphocyte proliferation; such a property suggests the possibility of ADSCs being used for xenotransplantation.

=== Homing effect ===
The homing effect refers to the engraftment of ADSCs to bone marrow endothelium due to the arrest of ADSCs within the vasculature of a tissue. ADSCs are engrafted to the bone marrow endothelium; adhesion interactions are activated to the bone marrow endothelium. Thus, such engraftment increases the probability of long-term survival of transferred fats. The homing effect follows three main processes: rolling, adhesion, and transmigration. During the rolling, ADSCs migrate and interacts with vascular endothelial cells in bone marrow in shear-resistant and low-affinity manners. As ADSCs adhere to bone marrow endothelium, MSCs express several different molecules that increase the adhesion such as CD44 isoforms and integrins. As ADSCs transmigrate through vessels in bone marrow, interaction and signaling between stromal-derived chemokine factor -1 (SDF-1) and receptor CXCR4 is the most crucial process.

=== Isolation or expansion from fats ===
Mechanical and enzymatic (ME) methods are the most common isolation methods, although there is no standard method. Accordingly, Glass and Ferretti proposed one of the ME methods which is to apply tumescent-assisted liposuction using a mechanical or ultrasound-assisted liposuction cannula. Through liposuction, the fat sample is digested by enzymatic activities of collagenase or trypsin in Dulbecco's modified Eagle's medium (DMEM). The resultant tissue suspension undergoes incubation and agitation at around 37 °C and is filtered through a strainer to remove unnecessary debris. The cell pallet left after centrifugation is the SVF, which is seeded on the plate after the second suspension with bovine calf serum, 1% penicillin or streptomycin, and L-glutamine. The adherent properties of ADSCs on the plate allow for their isolation, but due to the inconvenience of isolating the pure ADSCs, a cell-assisted lipo-transfer (CAL) is more commonly used. CAL transforms poor ADSCs into enriched ADSCs by mixing SVF isolate and aspirated fat. The efficacy of CAL was proven by the increased survival rate of autologous breast augmentation when introduced around 270 ml for each breast.

== Complications and safety ==
=== Breast implant ===
Around 1.5 million women have breast implant surgeries per year, but the side effects can be severe and cause irreversible damage to the patient's body. The most well-known side effects are foreign body sensation, calcification, fat cell necrosis, capsular construction, rupture, cysts and some fat cells leaving the implanted area.

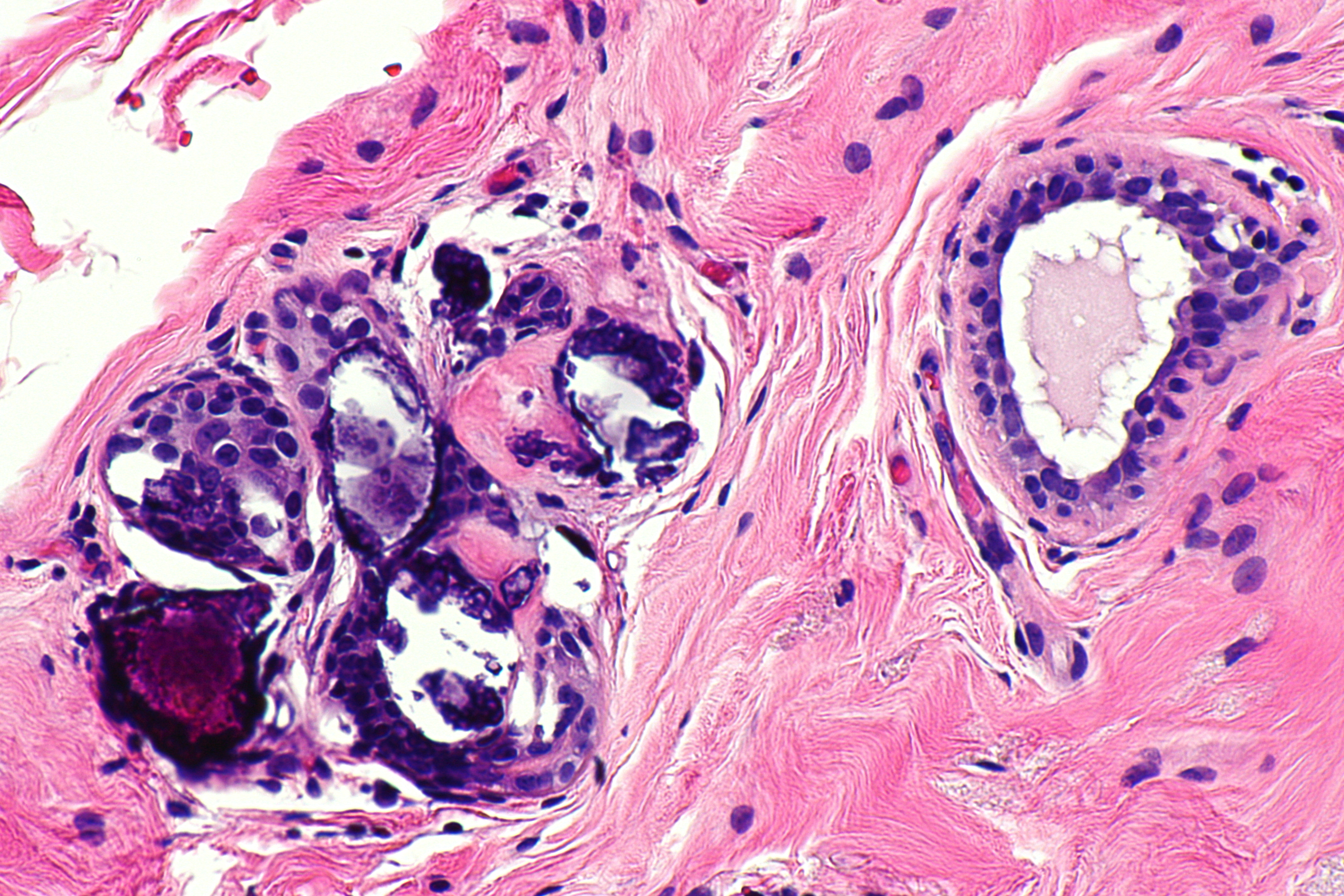
Benign calcification in breast, at high magnification

In most cases, calcification and cysts are the biggest threat of breast augmentation surgery. Fat stem cells that fail to pick up a new blood supply will die and be removed from the body by immune cells. However, if they are missed, the cluster will lead to calcification and cyst formation. These are visible on the breast as lump sometimes and are more dangerous when these dead cells are detected as cancer cells, which hinders an accurate diagnosis of breast cancer. The calcified tissue will be diagnosed as a benign cancer and not cause any harm. However, if the tissue is severely damaged the entire breast needs to be removed. Once a patient is diagnosed with breast implant calcification, regular mammograms should be done to monitor the possible cancer development.

=== Facial fat transfer ===
Gornitsky et al. from McGill University conducted a systematic review of 4,577 patients who have received the facial fat transfer. The most prevalent side effects reported were asymmetry, skin irregularities, hypertrophy, prolonged edema, and fat necrosis.

=== Oncology safety ===
The homing effect may have advantages in increasing the long-term survival of transferred fat, but concerns remain for patients with post-oncologic history, specifically breast cancer. It is more alarming since breast tumors are closely located with adipose tissue, as they develop a favorable microenvironment for cancer progression through homing and migration. There are cancer-associated adipocytes (CAAs) crucial for metastasis and the progression of tumors. Under normal conditions, the adipocytes are mature and they do not differentiate. However, when ADSCs migrate and circulate in blood vessels by the homing effect, it can result in the progression of tumor growth. Furthermore, the properties of migratory cells also promote tumor growth by secretion of trophic factors such as adipokines like FGF, ILs and IGF-binding proteins; this increases vascularisation as such oncogenic properties are unusual for other BM-MSCs or lung-derived MSDCs.

== Application and marketing ==
=== Stem cell market ===
The stem cell market has grown largely along with the increasing awareness of stem cells in regenerative medicine. The Google web search big data analysis showed that the terms stem cell facelift and stem cell breast augmentation had 197,000 and 302,000 outcomes, respectively, according to the American Society of Plastic Surgeons.

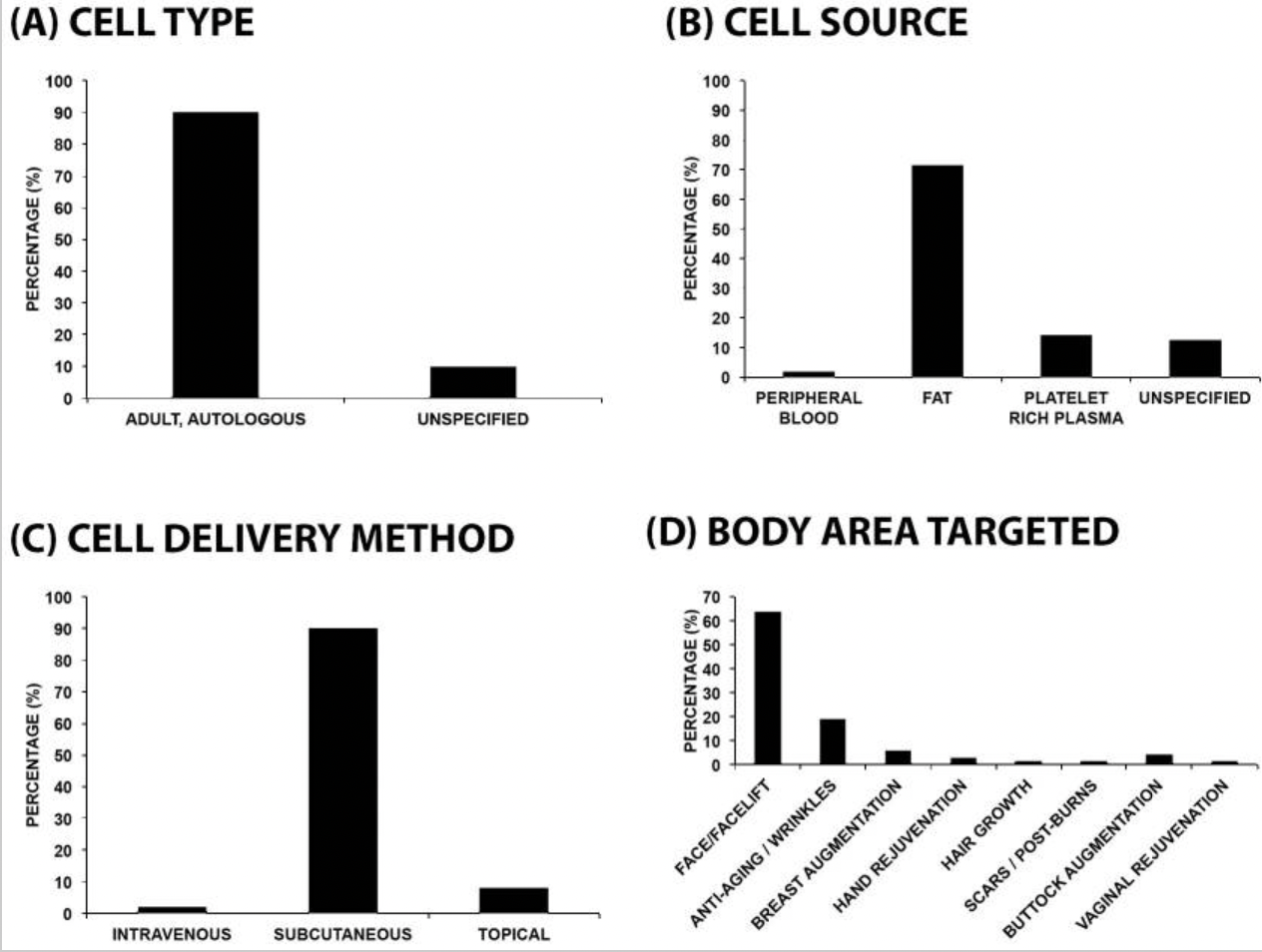
Nature of stem cell therapies offered across surveyed websites

With the rising interest in stem cell cosmetic therapy, the adjacent figure demonstrates the content analysis on the 50 clinical websites that appeared on Google for "stem cell therapy", "treatment" or "stem cell facelift" in November 2013. The result showed that 90% of the clinics use autologous adult stem cells, 71% of clinics obtained stem cells from patient fat, 90% of procedures delivered cells through subcutaneous methods, and facial anti-ageing treatment was advertised the most in stem cell treatments as well as stem cell breast augmentation therapies.

=== Case study: South Korea ===
The International Association of Aesthetic Plastic Surgery announced the Korean plastic surgery market is estimated to be worth about $440 million as of 2017. It is a quarter of the world market, and the number of plastic surgeries per year ranked first (13.5 per 1,000 people per year). Korean stem cell markets formed a scale of $1.1 billion in 2016 and they are expected to grow to 26.67% annually by 2025 ($9.5 billion).

In 2017 the government invested in the bio sector for the highest proportion for new drug development (13%), and only 4% on stem cells ($112 million). CartistemTM, Inc. Medipost published successfully developed stem cell-based degenerative knee cartilage therapy and has achieved more than 10 billion sales since 2017.

==== Legal issues ====
Behind the large stem cell cosmetic therapy market size of South Korea, non-specialists practice without a license in some clinics. According to the National Statistical Office, the number of plastic surgeons was 1,924 in 2018, and the Korean Plastic Surgery Association estimates that non-specialists in cosmetic surgery will be about 10 times that of specialists.

Dr. Shin mentioned, "There have been similar surgeries that advocate stem cell breast plastic surgery recently. When receiving stem cell breast surgery, patients need to check whether the doctor has officially proved and whether the hospital has stem cell researchers and high-quality equipment."

== Diet after stem cell therapy ==
Studies have shown that diet is closely related to stem cell proliferation and performance. Among numerous chemicals that affect the entire stem cell differentiation and settlement process, it is shown that taking extra supplements such as below can help stem cells to function better.

- Vitamins such as A, B3 and C are effective targets in vitamin-dependent pathways in stem cell manipulation. Vitamin C particularly stimulates cell proliferation to produce bone marrow stem cells. Vitamin D assists stem cells during differentiation by stimulating the activities in embryonic stem cells and iPSCs, and regulates embryonic hematopoietic stem and progenitor cell production and human umbilical cord stem cell development.
- Glucosamine and chondroitin improve stem cell function by promoting adequate growth of proliferative tissue lineages progenitors.
- Glycemic index and calorie restriction by cutting carbohydrates and sugar enhance stem cell activity. At the mitochondrial level, the MSCs utilize energy more efficiently when the glycemic index was restricted to low by increasing MSC oxygen consumption and exhibiting anti-ageing abilities, while their differentiation abilities remain unaffected.
