= Xenotransplantation =

Transplantation of cells or tissue across species

- Long axis echocardiography. Representative long axis view echocardiography, four weeks after myocardial infarction (MI), right before CMPC/placebo infusion. Thinning and akinesia of the septal apical wall due to MI can be appreciated.
- MeSH: D014183

Xenotransplantation (xenos- from the Greek meaning "foreign" or strange), or heterologous transplant, is the transplantation of living cells, tissues or organs from one species to another. Such cells, tissues or organs are called xenografts or xenotransplants. It is contrasted with allotransplantation (from other individual of same species), syngeneic transplantation or isotransplantation (grafts transplanted between two genetically identical individuals of the same species), and autotransplantation (from one part of the body to another in the same person). Xenotransplantation is an artificial method of creating an animal-human chimera, that is, a human with a subset of animal cells. In contrast, an individual where each cell contains genetic material from a human and an animal is called a human–animal hybrid.

Patient derived xenografts are created by xenotransplantation of human tumor cells into immunocompromised mice, and is a research technique frequently used in pre-clinical oncology research.

Human xenotransplantation offers a potential treatment for end-stage organ failure, a significant health problem in parts of the industrialized world. It also raises many novel medical, legal and ethical issues. A continuing concern is that many animals, such as pigs, have a shorter lifespan than humans, meaning that their tissues age at a quicker rate. (Pigs have a maximum life span of about 27 years.) Disease transmission (xenozoonosis) and permanent alteration to the genetic information of animals are also causes for concern. Similarly to objections to animal testing, animal rights activists have also objected to xenotransplantation on ethical grounds. A few temporarily successful cases of xenotransplantation are published.

Bioprosthetic artificial heart valves are generally pig or bovine-derived, but the cells are killed by glutaraldehyde treatment before insertion, therefore technically not fulfilling the WHO definition of xenotransplantation of being live cells.

== History ==
The first serious attempts at xenotransplantation (then called heterotransplantation) appeared in the scientific literature in 1905, when slices of rabbit kidney were transplanted into a child with chronic kidney disease. In the first two decades of the 20th century, several subsequent efforts to use organs from lambs, pigs, and primates were published.

Scientific interest in xenotransplantation declined when the immunological basis of the organ rejection process was described. The next waves of studies on the topic came with the discovery of immunosuppressive drugs. Even more studies followed Joseph Murray's first successful renal transplantation in 1954 and scientists, facing the ethical questions of organ donation for the first time, accelerated their effort in looking for alternatives to human organs.

=== Non-human kidney to a human ===
On February 16, 1963, the first transplant of a non-human animal's organ into a human being took place in Minneapolis when surgeons led by Claude R. Hitchcock and R. Joseph Kiser "tried grafting a baboon kidney" into "a woman in whom previously implanted human kidney (from a corpse) was doing poorly", and the kidney "immediately began functioning normally and cleared her blood of wastes". Her body rejected the kidney five days afterward and she died in March, three weeks later.

Starting in October 1963, doctors at Tulane University attempted renal transplantations from non-human primates in six people who were near death. The first person, a 32 year old woman with a chronic kidney disease received the kidneys of a rhesus monkey and the kidneys "functioned well for seven days, then failed," and the patient died later from her illness. The first successful attempt (one in which the patient was able to leave the hospital and return home) with a chimpanzee was performed on November 5 at Charity Hospital in New Orleans by a 12-man team of Tulane physicians, led by Keith Reemtsma, and the patient, a 44-year-old dock worker named Jefferson Davis, left the hospital on December 17 after a six-week recuperation. After this and several subsequent unsuccessful attempts to use primates as organ donors and the development of a working cadaver organ procuring program, interest in xenotransplantation for kidney failure dissipated. Out of 13 such transplants performed by Keith Reemtsma, one kidney recipient lived for nine months.

=== Non-human heart to a human ===
An American infant girl known as "Baby Fae" with hypoplastic left heart syndrome was the first infant recipient of a xenotransplantation, when she received a baboon heart on October 26, 1984. The procedure was performed by Leonard Lee Bailey at Loma Linda University Medical Center in Loma Linda, California. Fae died 21 days later, on November 15, due to a humoral-based graft rejection thought to be caused mainly by an ABO blood type mismatch, considered unavoidable due to the rarity of type O baboons. The graft was meant to be temporary, but unfortunately a suitable allograft replacement could not be found in time. While the procedure itself did not advance the progress on xenotransplantation, it did shed a light on the insufficient amount of organs for infants. The story made such an impact that the crisis of infant organ shortage improved for that time.

=== Non-human heart, lungs, and kidneys to a human ===
The first heart transplant in a human ever performed was by Hardy in 1964, using a chimpanzee heart, but the patient died within 2 hours. The first transplant of a non-genetically modified pig's heart, lungs and kidneys into a human was performed in Sonapur, Assam in mid-December 1996, and was announced in January 1997. The recipient was Purno Saikia, a 32-year-old terminally-ill man; he died of multiple infections shortly after the operation. The Indian cardiothoracic surgeon Dhani Ram Baruah and two of his associates, Jonathan Ho Kei-shing (of the Hong Kong-based Prince of Wales Medical Institute) and C.S. James, performed the surgeries. Baruah claimed that Saikia had failed to respond to conventional surgery, and that the patient and his family had consented to the procedure.

All three involved in the surgery were arrested on January 9, 1997, for the alleged violation of the Transplantation of Human Organs and Tissues Act of 1994. Baruah was dismissed in medical circles as a "mad scientist" and the procedure was dubbed a "hoax". Baruah signed a statement saying he had done no transplant, but then alleged that the confession was forced from him. They were found guilty of unethical procedure and culpable homicide and imprisoned for 40 days. Dhani Ram Baruah's surgical institute was also found to be without necessary registration.

Critics said Dhani Bam Baruah's claims and medical procedures were neither taken seriously nor accepted by the scientific community because he never got his findings scientifically peer-reviewed. Past complaints of ethics violations during surgeries in Hong Kong by Baruah and Ho had occurred in 1992, when they had implanted heart valves, developed by Baruah, made of animal tissue. A year later, six patients died. The Asian Medical News reported that "grave concerns" were expressed "over the procedure and ethics of the implementation".

=== Genetically engineered non-human kidney to a human ===
In September 2021, surgeons led by Robert Montgomery performed the first genetically engineered pig kidney xenotransplant to a brain-dead human at NYU Langone Health with no sign of immediate rejection (partly because the pig thymus gland was transplanted as well). The kidney was procured from a pig with only a single gene modification: the removal of alpha-gal.

In July 2023, surgeons from the NYU Langone Transplant Institute completed a transplant of a genetically modified pig kidney (along with the pig's thymus gland underneath it) into a patient declared brain dead but maintained on a respirator. The patient had previously consented to be an organ donor, but his tissues were not considered suitable for transplant. The kidney came from an animal with a knocked-out gene for the production of alpha gal sugars, which has been implicated in immune response to mammalian tissue. In order to ensure that renal function was only supported by the pig kidney, the team removed both of the patient's kidneys. The team has reported that the kidney has maintained optimal functioning for over a month, as evidenced by routine testing of creatinine and weekly biopsies. The team plans to monitor the patient for another month, pending approval by ethics board and his family.

In March 2024, Richard Slayman, a patient whose transplanted human kidney had failed, received a genetically engineered pig kidney xenotransplant from surgeons at Massachusetts General Hospital. This kidney has 69 genomic edits (3 gene knockouts, 7 human gene insertions and 59 copies of the porcine retrovirus knockout) made by eGenesis, Inc. Slayman died a few months later of unrelated causes, with no apparent rejection of the kidney. Meanwhile, in April 2024, Lisa Pisano became the second person to receive such a kidney transplant. Because of "unique challenges" related to a mechanical heart pump she received along with the kidney, her kidney had to be removed due to "insufficient blood flow" late in May. Medication also deteriorated the kidney, which led to its rejection.

In 2025, Tim Andrews and Bill Stewart received gene-edited pig kidneys from surgeons at Massachusetts General Hospital. Andrews lived with the kidney for 271 days, doubling the previous record of 130 days for a pig kidney transplant, but just short of the xenotransplant record of 273 days for a chimpanzee kidney transplant in 1964. The kidney was removed in October 2025 due to rejection, and Andrews later received a human kidney transplant in January 2026. "Based on lessons from these early cases, the U.S. Food and Drug Administration (FDA) has granted approval to biotech company eGenesis to launch a clinical trial that will transplant gene-edited pig kidneys into 30 patients who are 50 or older and on dialysis while awaiting a human kidney."

=== Genetically engineered non-human heart to a human ===
In January 2022, doctors led by cardiothoracic surgeon Bartley P. Griffith and Muhammad M. Mohiuddin at the University of Maryland Medical Center and University of Maryland School of Medicine performed a heart transplant from a genetically modified pig to a terminally ill patient, David Bennett Sr., who was ineligible for a standard human heart transplant. The pig had undergone specific gene editing to remove enzymes responsible for producing sugar antigens that lead to hyperacute organ rejection in humans. The US medical regulator gave special dispensation to carry out the procedure under compassionate use criteria. The recipient died two months after the transplantation.

In June and July 2022, surgeons at NYU Langone Health performed two genetically modified pig heart transplants into recently deceased humans. The hearts were from pigs that had the identical 10 genetic modifications used in the University of Maryland Medical Center heart xenotransplantation in January 2022. All three hearts came from Revivicor, Inc., a facility based in Blacksburg, Va., and a subsidiary of United Therapeutics.

On 20 September 2023, surgeons at the University of Maryland Medical Center in Baltimore performed a heart transplant from a genetically modified pig to Lawrence Faucette, a patient with terminal heart disease who was ineligible for a traditional heart transplant. On 30 October 2023, Faucette died after showing signs of organ rejection.

== Potential uses ==
A worldwide shortage of organs for clinical implantation causes about 20–35% of patients who need replacement organs to die on the waiting list. Certain procedures, some of which are being investigated in early clinical trials, aim to use cells or tissues from other species to treat life-threatening and debilitating illnesses such as cancer, diabetes, liver failure and Parkinson's disease. If vitrification can be perfected, it could allow for long-term storage of xenogenic cells, tissues and organs so that they would be more readily available for transplant.

Xenotransplants could save 100,000 patients waiting for donated organs. The animal organ, for example, from a pig could be (and has been) genetically altered with human genes to trick a patient's immune system into accepting it as a part of its own body. They have re-emerged because of the lack of organs available and the constant battle to keep immune systems from rejecting allotransplants. Xenotransplants are thus potentially a more effective alternative.

Xenotransplantation of human tumor cells into immunocompromised mice is a research technique frequently used in oncology research. It is used to predict the sensitivity of the transplanted tumor to various cancer treatments; several companies offer this service, including the Jackson Laboratory.

Human organs have been transplanted into animals as a powerful research technique for studying human biology without harming human patients. This technique has also been proposed as an alternative source of human organs for future transplantation into human patients. For example, researchers from the Ganogen Research Institute transplanted human fetal kidneys into rats which demonstrated life supporting function and growth.

== Potential animal organ donors ==
Since they are the closest relatives to humans, non-human primates were first considered as a potential organ source for xenotransplantation to humans. Chimpanzees were originally considered the best option since their organs are of similar size, and they have good blood type compatibility with humans, which makes them potential candidates for xenotransfusions. However, since chimpanzees are listed as an endangered species, other potential donors were sought. Baboons are more readily available, but impractical as potential donors. Problems include their smaller body size, the infrequency of blood group O (the universal donor), their long gestation period, and their typically small number of offspring. In addition, a major problem with the use of nonhuman primates is the increased risk of disease transmission, since they are so closely related to humans.

Pigs (Sus scrofa domesticus) are currently thought to be the best candidates for organ donation. The risk of cross-species disease transmission is decreased because of their increased phylogenetic distance from humans. Pigs have relatively short gestation periods, large litters, and are easy to breed, making them readily available. They are inexpensive and easy to maintain in pathogen-free facilities, and current gene editing tools are adapted to pigs to combat rejection and potential zoonoses. Pig organs are anatomically comparable in size, and new infectious agents are less likely since they have been in close contact with humans through domestication for many generations. Treatments sourced from pigs have proven to be successful such as porcine-derived insulin for patients with diabetes mellitus. Increasingly, genetically engineered pigs are becoming the norm, which raises moral qualms, but also increases the success rate of the transplant. Current experiments in xenotransplantation most often use pigs as the donor, and baboons as human models. In 2020, the U.S. Food and Drug Administration approved a genetic modification of pigs so they do not produce alpha-gal sugars. Pig organs have been used for kidney and heart transplants into humans.

== Barriers and issues ==
=== Immunologic barriers ===
As of 20 September 2025, no xenotransplantation trials have been successful for more than 238 days due to the many obstacles arising from the response of the recipient's immune system, although at least two patients have not yet rejected their xenotransplants and are still off dialysis.. Xenozoonoses are one of the biggest threats to rejections, as they are xenogeneic infections. The introduction of these microorganisms are a big issue that lead to the fatal infections and then rejection of the organs. This response, which is generally more extreme than in allotransplantations, ultimately results in rejection of the xenograft, and can in some cases result in the immediate death of the recipient. There are several types of rejection organ xenografts are faced with, these include hyperacute rejection, acute vascular rejection, cellular rejection, and chronic rejection.

A rapid, violent, and hyperacute response comes as a result of antibodies present in the host organism. These antibodies are known as xenoreactive natural antibodies (XNAs).

==== Hyperacute rejection ====
This rapid and violent type of rejection occurs within minutes to hours from the time of the transplant. It is mediated by the binding of XNAs (xenoreactive natural antibodies) to the donor endothelium, causing activation of the human complement system, which results in endothelial damage, inflammation, thrombosis and necrosis of the transplant. XNAs are first produced and begin circulating in the blood in neonates, after colonization of the bowel by bacteria with galactose moieties on their cell walls. Most of these antibodies are the IgM class, but also include IgG, and IgA.

The epitope XNAs target is an α-linked galactose moiety, galactose-alpha-1,3-galactose (also called the α-Gal epitope), produced by the enzyme alpha-galactosyltransferase. Most non-primates contain this enzyme thus, this epitope is present on the organ epithelium and is perceived as a foreign antigen by primates, which lack the galactosyl transferase enzyme. In pig to primate xenotransplantation, XNAs recognize porcine glycoproteins of the integrin family.

The binding of XNAs initiate complement activation through the classical complement pathway. Complement activation causes a cascade of events leading to: destruction of endothelial cells, platelet degranulation, inflammation, coagulation, fibrin deposition, and hemorrhage. The result is thrombosis and necrosis of the xenograft.

Hyperacute rejection is a severe, immediate immune response that occurs when a transplanted organ, such as a pig kidney, is rapidly attacked and destroyed by the recipient's immune system. In the context of pig kidney xenotransplantation, this type of rejection is triggered by pre-existing antibodies in the recipient's blood that recognize and bind to antigens on the surface of the pig kidney cells. These antigens, which are foreign to the human immune system, include certain carbohydrates and proteins that are not present in human tissues. The binding of these antibodies activates the complement system, leading to a cascade of events that cause widespread clotting and inflammation in the transplanted organ's blood vessels. As a result, the kidney quickly becomes ischemic (lacking adequate blood flow) and undergoes acute damage, often resulting in the organ's immediate loss.

Hyperacute rejection can severely affect the recipient’s body by leading to the rapid and complete failure of the transplanted kidney. This failure not only undermines the purpose of the transplant, which is to restore kidney function, but also poses serious health risks to the recipient. The sudden loss of kidney function can result in the accumulation of waste products and fluids in the body, causing symptoms such as swelling, electrolyte imbalances, and potential life-threatening complications. Furthermore, hyperacute rejection necessitates immediate medical intervention, often leading to the removal of the rejected kidney and the need to explore alternative treatment options, such as returning to dialysis or seeking another transplant.

==== Overcoming hyperacute rejection ====
Since hyperacute rejection presents such a barrier to the success of xenografts, several strategies to overcome it are under investigation:

Interruption of the complement cascade

- The recipient's complement cascade can be inhibited through the use of cobra venom factor (which depletes C3), soluble complement receptor type 1, anti-C5 antibodies, or C1 inhibitor (C1-INH). Disadvantages of this approach include the toxicity of cobra venom factor, and most importantly these treatments would deprive the individual of a functional complement system.

Transgenic organs (Genetically engineered pigs)

- 1,3 galactosyl transferase gene knockouts – These pigs do not contain the gene that codes for the enzyme responsible for expression of the immunogeneic gal-α-1,3Gal moiety (the α-Gal epitope).
- Increased expression of H-transferase (α-1,2-fucosyltransferase), an enzyme that competes with galactosyl transferase. Experiments have shown this reduces α-Gal expression by 70%.
- Expression of human complement regulators (CD55, CD46, and CD59) to inhibit the complement cascade.
- Plasmaphoresis, on humans to remove 1,3 galactosyltransferase, reduces the risk of activation of effector cells such as CTL (CD8 T cells), complement pathway activation and delayed type hypersensitivity (DTH).

==== Acute vascular rejection ====
Also known as delayed xenoactive rejection, this type of rejection occurs in discordant xenografts within 2 to 3 days, if hyperacute rejection is prevented. The process is much more complex than hyperacute rejection and is currently not completely understood. Acute vascular rejection requires de novo protein synthesis and is driven by interactions between the graft endothelial cells and host antibodies, macrophages, and platelets. The response is characterized by an inflammatory infiltrate of mostly macrophages and natural killer cells (with small numbers of T cells), intravascular thrombosis, and fibrinoid necrosis of vessel walls.

Binding of the previously mentioned XNAs to the donor endothelium leads to the activation of host macrophages as well as the endothelium itself. The endothelium activation is considered type II since gene induction and protein synthesis are involved. The binding of XNAs ultimately leads to the development of a procoagulant state, the secretion of inflammatory cytokines and chemokines, as well as expression of leukocyte adhesion molecules such as E-selectin, intercellular adhesion molecule-1 (ICAM-1), and vascular cell adhesion molecule-1 (VCAM-1).

This response is further perpetuated as normally binding between regulatory proteins and their ligands aid in the control of coagulation and inflammatory responses. However, due to molecular incompatibilities between the molecules of the donor species and recipient (such as porcine major histocompatibility complex molecules and human natural killer cells), this may not occur.

==== Overcoming acute vascular rejection ====
Due to its complexity, the use of immunosuppressive drugs along with a wide array of approaches are necessary to prevent acute vascular rejection, and include administering a synthetic thrombin inhibitor to modulate thrombogenesis, depletion of anti-galactose antibodies (XNAs) by techniques such as immunoadsorption, to prevent endothelial cell activation, and inhibiting activation of macrophages (stimulated by CD4^{+} T cells) and NK cells (stimulated by the release of Il-2). Thus, the role of MHC molecules and T cell responses in activation would have to be reassessed for each species combo.

==== Accommodation ====
Accommodation, which is the survival of the xenograft despite the presence of circulating XNAs, is possible if hyperacute and acute vascular rejection are avoided. The graft is given a break from humoral rejection when the complement cascade is interrupted, circulating antibodies are removed, their function is changed, or there is a change in the expression of surface antigens on the graft. This allows the xenograft to up-regulate and express protective genes, which aid in resistance to injury, such as heme oxygenase-1 (an enzyme that catalyzes the degradation of heme).

==== Cellular rejection ====
Rejection of the xenograft in hyperacute and acute vascular rejection is due to the response of the humoral immune system, since the response is elicited by the XNAs. Cellular rejection is based on cellular immunity, and is mediated by natural killer cells that accumulate in and damage the xenograft and T-lymphocytes which are activated by MHC molecules through both direct and indirect xenorecognition.

In direct xenorecognition, antigen presenting cells from the xenograft present peptides to recipient CD4^{+} T cells via xenogeneic MHC class II molecules, resulting in the production of interleukin 2 (IL-2). Indirect xenorecognition involves the presentation of antigens from the xenograft by recipient antigen presenting cells to CD4^{+} T cells. Antigens of phagocytosed graft cells can also be presented by the host's class I MHC molecules to CD8^{+} T cells.

The strength of cellular rejection in xenografts remains uncertain, however, it is expected to be stronger than in allografts due to differences in peptides among different animals. This leads to more antigens potentially recognized as foreign, thus eliciting a greater indirect xenogenic response.

==== Overcoming cellular rejection ====
A proposed strategy to avoid cellular rejection is to induce donor non-responsiveness using hematopoietic chimerism. Donor stem cells are introduced into the bone marrow of the recipient, where they coexist with the recipient's stem cells. The bone marrow stem cells give rise to cells of all hematopoietic lineages, through the process of hematopoiesis. Lymphoid progenitor cells are created by this process and move to the thymus where negative selection eliminates T cells found to be reactive to self. The existence of donor stem cells in the recipient's bone marrow causes donor reactive T cells to be considered self-reactive and undergo apoptosis.

==== Chronic rejection ====
Chronic rejection is slow and progressive, and usually occurs in transplants that survive the initial rejection phases. Scientists are still unclear how chronic rejection exactly works, research in this area is difficult since xenografts rarely survive past the initial acute rejection phases. Nonetheless, it is known that XNAs and the complement system are not primarily involved. Fibrosis in the xenograft occurs as a result of immune reactions, cytokines (which stimulate fibroblasts), or healing (following cellular necrosis in acute rejection). Perhaps the major cause of chronic rejection is arteriosclerosis. Lymphocytes, which were previously activated by antigens in the vessel wall of the graft, activate macrophages to secrete smooth muscle growth factors. This results in a build up of smooth muscle cells on the vessel walls, causing the hardening and narrowing of vessels within the graft. Chronic rejection leads to pathologic changes of the organ, and is why transplants must be replaced after so many years. It is also anticipated that chronic rejection will be more aggressive in xenotransplants as opposed to allotransplants.

==== Dysregulated coagulation ====
Successful efforts have been made to create knockout mice without α1,3GT; the resulting reduction in the highly immunogenic αGal epitope has resulted in the reduction of the occurrence of hyperacute rejection, but has not eliminated other barriers to xenotransplantation such as dysregulated coagulation, also known as coagulopathy.

Different organ xenotransplants result in different responses in clotting. For example, kidney transplants result in a higher degree of coagulopathy, or impaired clotting, than cardiac transplants, whereas liver xenografts result in severe thrombocytopenia, causing recipient death within a few days due to bleeding. An alternate clotting disorder, thrombosis, may be initiated by preexisting antibodies that affect the protein C anticoagulant system. Due to this effect, porcine donors must be extensively screened before transplantation. Studies have also shown that some porcine transplant cells are able to induce human tissue factor expression, thus stimulating platelet and monocyte aggregation around the xenotransplanted organ, causing severe clotting. Additionally, spontaneous platelet accumulation may be caused by contact with pig von Willebrand factor.

Just as the α1,3G epitope is a major problem in xenotransplantation, so too is dysregulated coagulation a cause of concern. Transgenic pigs that can control for variable coagulant activity based on the specific organ transplanted would make xenotransplantation a more readily available solution for the 70,000 patients per year who do not receive a human donation of the organ or tissue they need.

=== Physiology ===
Extensive research is required to determine whether animal organs can replace the physiological functions of human organs. Many issues include:

- size – with pigs for example, organs are taken from young pigs to be of suitable size for donation, and these may still be able to grow afterwards
- longevity – the lifespan of most pigs is roughly 15 years, currently it is unknown how xenotransplanted organs age
- hormone and protein differences – some proteins will be molecularly incompatible, which could cause malfunction of important regulatory processes. These differences also make the prospect of hepatic xenotransplantation less promising, since the liver plays an important role in the production of so many proteins
- environment – for example, pig hearts work in a different anatomical site and under different hydrostatic pressure than in humans
- temperature – the body temperature of pigs is 39 °C (2 °C above the average human body temperature). Implications of this difference, if any, on the activity of important enzymes are currently unknown.

=== Xenozoonosis ===
Xenozoonosis, also known as zoonosis or xenosis, is the transmission of infectious agents between species via xenograft. Animal to human infection is normally rare, but has occurred in the past. An example of such is the avian influenza, when an influenza A virus was passed from birds to humans. Xenotransplantation may increase the chance of disease transmission for 3 reasons: (1) implantation breaches the physical barrier that normally helps to prevent disease transmission, (2) the recipient of the transplant will be severely immunosuppressed, and (3) human complement regulators (CD46, CD55, and CD59) expressed in transgenic pigs have been shown to serve as virus receptors, and may also help to protect viruses from attack by the complement system.

Examples of viruses carried by pigs include porcine herpesvirus, rotavirus, parvovirus, and circovirus. Porcine herpesviruses and rotaviruses can be eliminated from the donor pool by screening, however others (such as parvovirus and circovirus) may contaminate food and footwear then re-infect the herd. Thus, pigs to be used as organ donors must be housed under strict regulations and screened regularly for microbes and pathogens. Unknown viruses, as well as those not harmful in the animal, may also pose risks. Of particular concern are PERVs (porcine endogenous retroviruses), vertically transmitted microbes that embed in swine genomes. The risks with xenosis are twofold, as not only could the individual become infected, but a novel infection could initiate an epidemic in the human population. Because of this risk, the FDA in 2006 suggested any recipients of xenotransplants shall be closely monitored for the remainder of their life, and quarantined if they show signs of xenosis. Since then PERVs have been eliminated from the pig genomes in successfully donated pig kidneys.

Baboons and pigs carry myriad transmittable agents that are harmless in their natural host, but extremely toxic and deadly in humans. HIV is an example of a disease believed to have jumped from monkeys to humans. Researchers also do not know if an outbreak of infectious diseases could occur and if they could contain the outbreak even though they have measures for control. Another obstacle facing xenotransplants is that of the body's rejection of foreign objects by its immune system. These antigens (foreign objects) are often treated with powerful immunosuppressive drugs that could, in turn, make the patient vulnerable to other infections and actually aid the disease. This is the reason the organs would have to be altered to fit the patients' DNA (histocompatibility).

In 2005, the Australian National Health and Medical Research Council (NHMRC) declared an eighteen-year moratorium on all animal-to-human transplantation, concluding that the risks of transmission of animal viruses to patients and the wider community had not been resolved. This was repealed in 2009 after an NHMRC review stated "... the risks, if appropriately regulated, are minimal and acceptable given the potential benefits.", citing international developments on the management and regulation of xenotransplantation by the World Health Organisation and the European Medicines Agency.

==== Porcine endogenous retroviruses ====
Endogenous retroviruses are remnants of ancient viral infections, found in the genomes of most, if not all, mammalian species. Integrated into the chromosomal DNA, they are vertically transferred through inheritance. Due to the many deletions and mutations they accumulate over time, they usually are not infectious in the host species, however the virus may become infectious in another species. PERVs were originally discovered as retrovirus particles released from cultured porcine kidney cells. Most breeds of swine harbor approximately 50 PERV genomes in their DNA. Although it is likely that most of these are defective, some may be able to produce infectious viruses so every proviral genome must be sequenced to identify which ones pose a threat. In addition, through complementation and genetic recombination, two defective PERV genomes could give rise to an infectious virus. There are three subgroups of infectious PERVs (PERV-A, PERV-B and PERV-C). Experiments have shown that PERV-A and PERV-B can infect human cells in culture. To date no experimental xenotransplantations have demonstrated PERV transmission, yet this does not mean PERV infections in humans are impossible. Pig cells have been engineered to inactivate all 62 PERVs in the genome using CRISPR Cas9 genome editing technology, and eliminated infection from the pig to human cells in culture.

=== Ethics ===
Xenografts have been a controversial procedure since they were first attempted. Many, including animal rights groups, strongly oppose killing animals to harvest their organs for human use. In the 1960s, many organs came from the chimpanzees, and were transferred into people that were deathly ill, and in turn, did not live much longer afterwards. Modern scientific supporters of xenotransplantation argue that the potential benefits to society outweigh the risks, making pursuing xenotransplantation the moral choice. None of the major religions object to the use of genetically modified pig organs for life-saving transplantation. Religions such as Buddhism and Jainism, however, have long espoused non-violence towards all living creatures. In general, the use of pig and cow tissue in humans has been met with little resistance, save some religious beliefs and a few philosophical objections. Experimentation without consent doctrines are now followed, which was not the case in the past, which may lead to new religious guidelines to further medical research on pronounced ecumenical guidelines. The "Common Rule" is the United States bio-ethics mandate as of 2011.

==== History of xenotransplantation in ethics ====
At the beginning of the 20th century when studies in xenotransplantation were just beginning, few questioned the morality of it, turning to animals as a "natural" alternative to allografts. While satirical plays mocked xenografters such as Serge Voronoff, and some images showing emotionally distraught primates – whom Voronoff had deprived of their testicles – appeared, no serious attempts were yet made to question the science based on animal rights concerns. Xenotransplantation was not taken seriously, at least in France, during the first half of the 20th century.

With the Baby Fae incident of 1984 as the impetus, animal rights activists began to protest, gathering media attention and proving that some people felt that it was unethical and a violation of the animal's own rights to use its organs to preserve a sick human's life. Treating animals as mere tools for the slaughter on demand by human will would lead to a world they would not prefer. Supporters of the transplant pushed back, claiming that saving a human life justifies the sacrifice of an animal one. Most animal rights activists found the use of primate organs more reprehensible than those of, for example, pigs. As Peter Singer et al. have expressed, many primates exhibit greater social structure, communication skills, and affection than mentally deficient humans and human infants. Despite this, it is considerably unlikely that animal suffering will provide sufficient impetus for regulators to prevent xenotransplantation.

==== Informed consent of patient ====
Autonomy and informed consent are important when considering the future uses of xenotransplantation. A patient undergoing xenotransplantation should be fully aware of the procedure and should have no outside force influencing their choice. The patient should understand the risks and benefits of such a transplantation. A public health dimension can also be considered.

The Ethics Committee of the International Xenotransplantation Association pointed out in 2003 that one major ethical issue is the societal response to such a procedure.

The application of the four bioethics principles is standardized in the moral conduct of laboratories. The four principles emphasize informed consent, the Hippocratic Oath to do no harm, using skills to help others, and protecting the right to quality care.

Though xenotransplantation may have future medical benefits, it also has the serious risk of introducing and spreading the infectious diseases, into the human population. Guidelines have been drafted by governments with the purpose of forming the foundation of infectious disease surveillance. United Kingdom guidelines state that patients have to agree to "the periodic provision of bodily samples that would then be archived for epidemiological purposes", "post-mortem analysis in case of death, the storage of samples post-mortem, and the disclosure of this agreement to their family", "refrain from donating blood, tissue or organs", "the use of barrier contraception when engaging in sexual intercourse", "keep both name and current address on register and to notify the relevant health authorities when moving abroad" and "divulge confidential information, including one's status as a xenotransplantation recipient to researchers, all health care professionals from whom one seeks professional services, and close contacts such as current and future sexual partners." The patient must abide by these rules throughout their lifetime or until the government determines that there is no need for public health safeguards.

==== Xenotransplantation guidelines in the United States ====
The Food and Drug Administration (FDA) has also stated that if a transplantation takes place, the recipient must undergo monitoring for the rest of their lifetime and waive their right to withdraw. The reason for requiring lifelong monitoring is due to the risk of acute infections that may occur. The FDA suggests that a passive screening program should be implemented and should extend for the life of the recipient.

== See also ==
- Bartley P. Griffith, the first surgeon to successfully transplant a pig heart into a human
- Allograft
- Isograft
- Medical grafting
- Hybrid (biology) – Offspring of cross-species reproduction
- Horizontal gene transfer – Transfer of genes from unrelated organisms
- Xenopregnancy
- Xenotransfusion
