= Syngenic =

Genetically identical or immunologically compatible in terms of transplantation

The word "syngenic" or "syngeneic" (from the Greek word for a relative) means genetically identical, or sufficiently identical and immunologically compatible as to allow for transplantation. For example, it may be used for something transplanted from an identical twin. When the cells are collected from the same patient on whom they will be used, a graft is called autologous. Syngeneic refers to a graft transferred between genetically identical animals or people. A syngeneic graft is known as an isograft.

Related terms include:

autogeneic, referring to autotransplantation, also termed autograft, (from one part of the body to another in the same person)
allogeneic, referring to allotransplantation or an allograft (from other individual of same species).
xenogeneic, referring to xenotransplantation or a xenograft (from other species).
