= Dhaniram Baruah =

Indian heart surgeon

- Education: MD; Glasgow University; Fellow, Royal College of Surgeons of England
- Known for: First pig-to-human heart transplantation
- Medical career
- Profession: Surgeon
- Field: Cardiac Surgery
- Institutions: University of Maryland Medical Center
- Sub-specialties: Cardiothoracic surgery Heart transplantation Lung transplantation Cardiac surgery

Dhaniram Baruah is an Indian heart surgeon from Assam, known for his work in the field of xenotransplantation. He is popularly known as India's Pig Heart Doctor. On 1 January 1997, he became the first heart surgeon in the world to transplant a pig's heart in a human body. Although the recipient died subsequently, it was a precursor to the first successful pig-to-human heart transplant performed 25 years later by Bartley P. Griffith in January 2022. While Griffith used a genetically modified pig's heart, Barua had transplanted a normal pig heart. Barua is also the founder of Dr Dhaniram Baruah Heart Institute & Research Centre. He can only communicate through hand gestures after a brain stroke left him unable to speak.

== Experiments, claims and controversies ==
Throughout his career Barua has courted controversies due to his maverick ideas and unconventional methods. The pig heart transplanted by Barua in his patient Purna Saikia worked for seven days, after which due to implications of infections, and the transplant was rejected by the recipient's body. Barua was sent to jail for 40 days in 1997 for negligence and violation of medical ethics. His clinic and research center was burnt down by an angry mob. He was also called a mad man and ostracised from the local community. But undeterred he continued his experiments, and claimed that successful transplantation of a pig heart in a human body was feasible. He later claimed damages from the Government for his humiliation and unjust treatment. He also claimed to have found a cure for HIV/AIDS.

== Legacy ==
Barua claims to have cured 86 patients of HIV/AIDS for which no conventional medicine is available. He has written a two-volume book titled "AIDS Reaching the Unreachable with Baruah Combat Genes".

== See also ==
- David Bennett Sr.
