= Richard Slayman =

American patient (1961/1962 – 2024)

Richard Slayman (1961/1962 – May 11, 2024) was an American patient, known to be the first patient to receive a genetically modified pig kidney transplant.

== Background ==
Slayman, a supervisor for the state transportation department from Weymouth, Massachusetts, had received a human kidney in 2018. When it began to fail in 2023 and he developed congestive heart failure, his doctors suggested he try one from a modified pig, which he received in a procedure at Massachusetts General Hospital on March 16, 2024.

=== Death ===
Slayman died on May 11, 2024, at the age of 62. The hospital said in a statement that they "have no indication" the death was caused by the transplant. The autopsy result, released with the family's permission, revealed that his death was caused by issues with his heart, not the transplanted kidney.
