= Bartley P. Griffith =

American heart surgeon (born 1949)

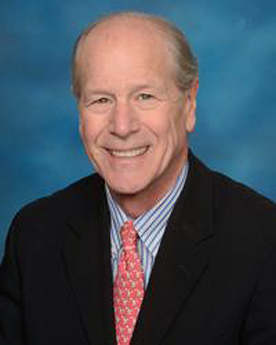
- Griffith in 2022
- Born: 1949 (age 76–77)
- Education: Bucknell University (1970), Jefferson Medical College, Thomas Jefferson University (MD) (1974)
- Known for: First successful heart transplant (about 2 month survival) from a pig to a human patient; the pig had been genetically modified to work better
- Medical career
- Profession: Surgeon
- Field: Professor of Cardiac Surgery
- Institutions: University of Maryland Medical Center; University of Pittsburgh School of Medicine
- Sub-specialties: Cardiothoracic surgery Heart transplantation Lung transplantation Cardiac surgery

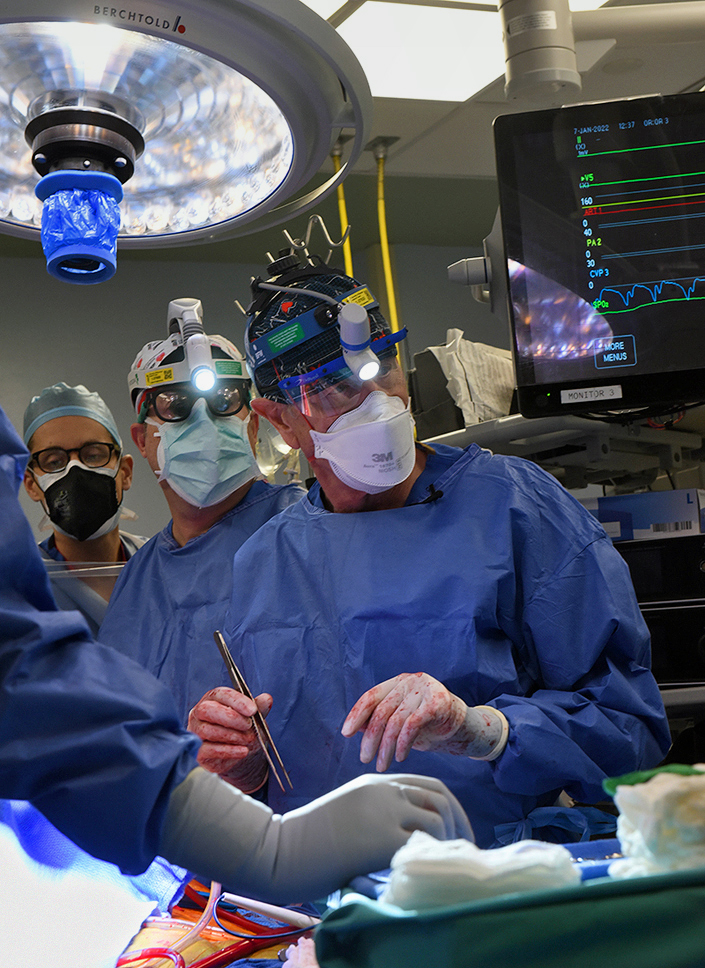
Griffith during a transplant operation

Bartley P. Griffith (born 1949) is an American heart surgeon. He is the first person to successfully transplant a pig heart into a human being.

== Pig heart transplants ==
Griffith joined Muhammad Mohiuddin's MD Xenoheart laboratory in 2018. Together, they were able to demonstrate that the heart of a genetically altered pig could support life when transplanted into an orthotopic (normal) position in the chest for up to 9 months. Griffith and Mohiuddin performed the first successful xenotransplantation (one species to another) of a genetically modified pig heart to a human on January 7, 2022. The recipient was 57-year-old David Bennett Sr. The procedure occurred at the University of Maryland Medical Center. Due to complications, David Bennett Sr died on March 8, 2022.

On September 20, 2023, Bartley P. Griffith performed his second pig heart transplant.

== See also ==
- Christiaan Barnard
- Xenotransplantation
- Heart transplantation
- Dhaniram Baruah
