= Homing (hematopoietic) =

Migration of cells toward their organ of origin

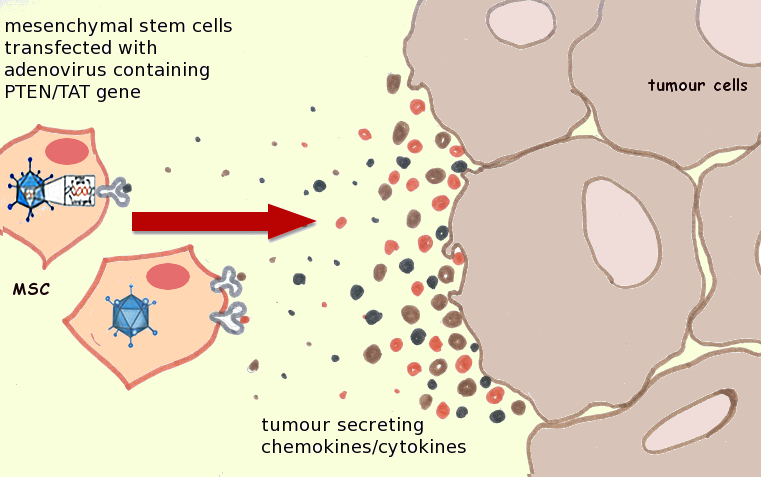
Mesenchymal stem cells migrating to tumour cells via chemoattraction

Homing is the phenomenon whereby cells migrate to the organ of their origin. By homing, transplanted hematopoietic cells are able to travel to and engraft (establish residence) in the bone marrow. Various chemokines and receptors are involved in the homing of hematopoietic stem cells.

== Sites ==
- Bone marrow
- Lymph nodes
- Skin
