= Allotransplantation =

Transplantation between individuals of the same species

Allotransplants
- MeSH: D014184

Allotransplant (allo- meaning "other" in Greek) is the transplantation of cells, tissues, or organs to a recipient from a genetically non-identical donor of the same species. The transplant is called an allograft, allogeneic transplant, or homograft. Most human tissue and organ transplants are allografts.

It is contrasted with autotransplantation (from one part of the body to another in the same person), syngenic transplantation of isografts (grafts transplanted between two genetically identical individuals) and xenotransplantation (from other species).

Allografts can be referred to as "homostatic" if they are biologically inert when transplanted, such as bone and cartilage.

An immune response against an allograft or xenograft is termed rejection. An allogenic bone marrow transplant can result in an immune attack on the recipient, called graft-versus-host disease.

== Procedure ==
Material is obtained from a donor who is a living person, or a deceased person's body receiving mechanical support or ventilation, or a deceased person's body whose heart stopped beating. Screening for pathology and risk factors for communicable diseases such as HIV and Hepatitis B and C is then conducted.

In the US, donor tissue must be recovered and processed adhering to the Current Good Tissue Practices rule. In most cases, it is sent to tissue banks for processing and distribution. Each year, Food and Drug Administration regulated and American Association of Tissue Banks-accredited tissue banks distribute 1.5 million bone and tissue allografts.

== Transplantable organs and tissues ==
A variety of organs and tissues can be used for allografts, including:

- Anterior cruciate ligament (ACL) repair
- Joint reconstruction in the knee and ankle
- Meniscal replacement
- Reconstruction due to cancer or trauma
- Ridge augmentation in dental procedures
- Shoulder repair
- Spinal fusion
- Urological procedures
- Skin transplants
- Corneal transplants
- Heart transplants
- Heart valves
- Lung transplantation
- Intestinal transplantation (isolated small bowel, intestine & liver, multivisceral)
- Liver transplants
- Kidney transplants
- Pancreas transplantation
- Islet cell transplantation
- Bone marrow transplants
- Bone allograft
- Ligament or tendon allograft

== Laws and regulations ==
=== United States ===
In the US, the Food and Drug Administration (FDA) has regulated human tissue intended for transplants since 1993. In order to ensure the quality of donor tissue and reduce contamination and disease transmission risks, three regulations addressing manufacturing activities associated with human cells, tissues, and cellular and tissue-based products (HCT/Ps) were promulgated in May 2005:

- companies producing and distributing HCT/Ps must register with the FDA.
- "Donor Eligibility" rule: prescribes criteria for donor eligibility.
- "Current Good Tissue Practices" rule: oversees overall processing and distribution practices of each company.

== Other transplant options ==
- Autograft, tissue transplanted from one site to another on the same patient. An autograft reduces the risk of rejection but requires a second surgery site, adding pain, risk and possible longer aftercare.
- Xenograft, a transplant from another species
- Isograft, a transplant from a genetically identical donor, such as an identical twin.
- Synthetic and metal implants. Unlike allografts, such grafts do not corporate into the body.

== Risks ==
As with many operations, allotransplantation risks some side effects. A limiting factor in tissue allotransplantation for reconstructive surgery deals with the side effects of immunosuppression (metabolic disorders, malignancies, opportunistic infections) which is a predominant issue. The risk of transmitting infection is high.

== See also ==
- Allograft diseases
- Medical grafting
