= Autotransplantation =

Surgically moving tissue to a different part of the same body

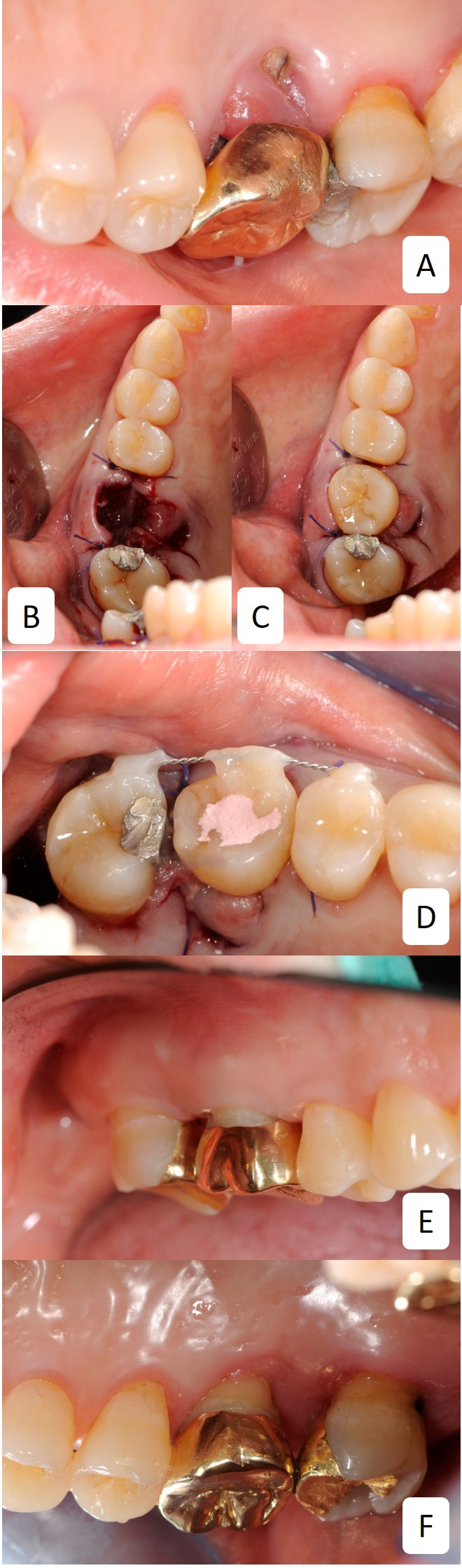
- Autotransplantation of wisdom tooth
- MeSH: D014182

Autotransplantation or autologous transplantation is the surgical transplantation of organs, tissues or even particular proteins from one site in an individual's body to another site within the same person (auto- meaning "self" in Greek).

The autologous tissue (also called autogenous, autogeneic, or autogenic tissue) transplanted by such a procedure is called an autograft or autotransplant.

It is contrasted with allotransplantation (from a genetically distinct individual of the same species), syngeneic transplantation (from a genetically identical individual of the same species), and xenotransplantation (from an individual of a different species).

Autotransplantation is applied across many medical specialties, including dental autotransplantation (surgical relocation of teeth within a person), organ autotransplantation (such as kidney autotransplantation for complex renal conditions), and autologous stem-cell transplantation where the patient’s own cells are collected and later reinfused. Examples include bone reconstruction from the iliac crest, tooth relocation in dentistry, and kidney repositioning for nutcracker syndrome or complex vascular reconstruction.

== Autologous blood donation ==
In blood banking terminology, autologous blood donation refers to a blood donation marked for use by the donor, typically for a scheduled surgery. (Generally, the notion of "donation" does not refer to giving to oneself, though in this context it has become somewhat acceptably idiomatic.) They are commonly called "autos" by blood bank personnel, and it is one major form of the more general concept of autotransfusion (the other being intraoperative blood salvage).

Some advantages of autologous blood donation are:

- Blood type will always match, even with a rare blood type or antibody type.
- If only autologous blood is used during surgery the risk of exposure to infectious disease such as hepatitis or HIV from blood is eliminated.
- The risk of allergic reactions is reduced.

The disadvantages are:

- Higher cost due to individualized processing, record-keeping, and management.
- In most cases, the blood is discarded if it is not used instead of being added to the general supply.
- Blood donation prior to colorectal cancer surgery seemed causative for a worse overall and colorectal cancer specific survival.

Autologous blood is not routinely tested for infectious disease markers (e.g., HIV, hepatitis) unless collected in one location and shipped to another, per FDA regulation 21 CFR 640.3.

There is also a risk that, in an emergency or if more blood is required than has been set aside in advance, the patient could still be exposed to donor blood instead of autologous blood. Autologous donation is also not suitable for patients who are medically unable to or advised not to give blood, such as cardiac patients or small children and infants.

== Bone autograft ==
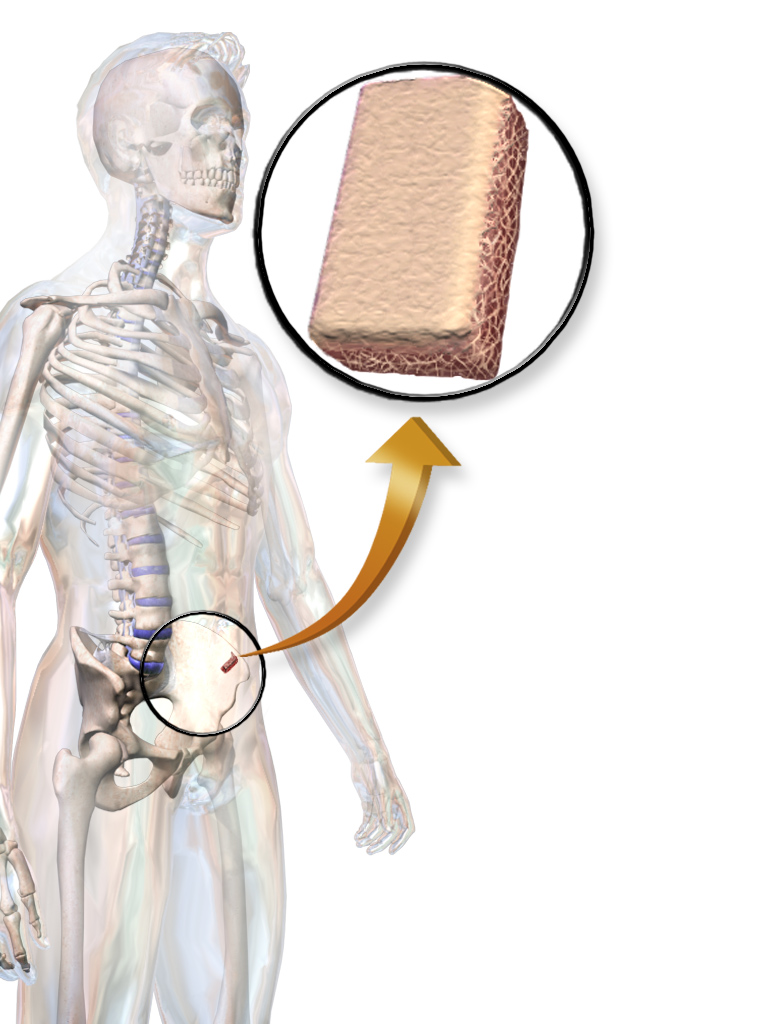
Illustration depicting bone autograft

In orthopaedic medicine, a bone graft can be sourced from a patient's own bone in order to fill space and produce an osteogenic response in a bone defect. However, due to the donor-site morbidity associated with autograft, other methods such as bone allograft and bone morphogenetic proteins and synthetic graft materials are often used as alternatives. Autografts have long been considered the gold standard in oral surgery and implant dentistry due to superior osteogenic, osteoinductive, and osteoconductive properties, achieving fusion rates of 85–95%. However, donor-site morbidity (pain, infection, hematoma) affects 15–30% of patients, leading to increased use of morphogen-enhanced bone graft substitutes with comparable regeneration but higher cost.

=== Dental autotransplantation ===
Dental autotransplantation is the surgical relocation of a tooth (typically a third molar or premolar) from one site to another in the same individual, most commonly to replace a missing or traumatized tooth. Success rates range from 80–98%, with 10-year survival up to 91–100% when performed on teeth with open apices (2/3–3/4 root development).

The procedure uses cone-beam CT (CBCT) for 3D planning and tooth replica guidance, minimizing extra-oral time (<15 minutes) and preserving the periodontal ligament. It is the only restorative option that maintains alveolar bone growth in adolescents and outperforms implants in patients under 20 due to continued eruption and proprioception.

Complications (ankylosis, resorption) occur in <5% of cases with proper case selection and atraumatic technique.

== Organ autotransplantation ==
Autotransplantation of selected organs is often preceded by ex vivo (also bench, back-table, or extracorporeal) surgery. For example, ex vivo liver resection and autotransplantation is used in the treatment of selected cases of conventionally unresectable hepatic tumors. It can also be implemented in rare scenarios of a blunt abdominal trauma. Kidney autotransplantation is used to preserve renal function in selected complex conditions such as renal artery aneurysms, ureteral injury or strictures, and loin pain–hematuria syndrome, and may be performed with traditional or minimally invasive techniques. Robotic-assisted laparoscopic kidney autotransplantation has achieved 93.1% complete pain relief and 90% overall symptom improvement at median follow-up of 8 years, with mean arterial pressure dropping from 143/82 mmHg to 127/72 mmHg. The uses of ex vivo surgery followed by autotransplantation were reported also for heart, lungs and intestines, including multivisceral approaches.

Induced pluripotent stem cells (iPSCs), capable of differentiating into any cell type, combined with nanotechnology-based immune modulation show promise for generating patient-specific organs, potentially eliminating donor shortages. Reprogramming technology would be used to obtain a personalized, patient-specific, cell product without problems related to histocompatibility of the transplanted tissues and organs. However, the ability to generate such tissues and organs will depend on successful strategies to overcome immunogenicity of the manipulated product.

== Hematopoietic stem cell autotransplantation ==
Autologous stem-cell transplantation involves harvesting a person's own peripheral blood mononuclear cells (PBMCs) by apheresis collection following mobilization of stem cells from the bone marrow into the peripheral blood and reinfusing them after high-dose chemotherapy to restore bone marrow function in certain malignancies. This is typically used for treatment of multiple myeloma or aggressive lymphoma. Stem cells are cryopreserved after collection for infusion after the patient undergoes high-dose chemotherapy. Stem cell rescue permits the use of higher doses of chemotherapy than would be tolerated otherwise. In transplant-eligible multiple myeloma, autologous stem-cell transplantation (ASCT) extends median overall survival by 8–10 years compared to non-transplant regimens, with only 20–30% of eligible U.S. patients proceeding due to access barriers. Tandem ASCT remains superior to single ASCT in high-risk cytogenetic disease, and second ASCT at relapse outperforms allogeneic transplantation.

== See also ==
- Autotransfusion
- Replantation
- Rotationplasty
- Spleen transplantation
- Stem cell fat grafting
