= Isograft =

An Isograft is a graft of tissue between two individuals who are genetically identical (i.e. monozygotic twins). Transplant rejection between two such individuals virtually never occurs, making isografts particularly relevant to organ transplantations; patients with organs from their identical twins are incredibly likely to receive the organs favorably and survive. Monozygotic twins have the same major histocompatibility complex, leading to the low instances of tissue rejection by the adaptive immune system. Furthermore, there is virtually no incidence of graft-versus-host disease.

In 1994 a research article demonstrated that islet isografts were being transplanted into young diabetic mice [STZ induced diabetic NOD mice] and the mice survived at least about 20 days post transplantation.
