= Tadeusza Kościuszki street, Bydgoszcz =

Street in Bydgoszcz, Poland

Tadeusza Kościuszki street
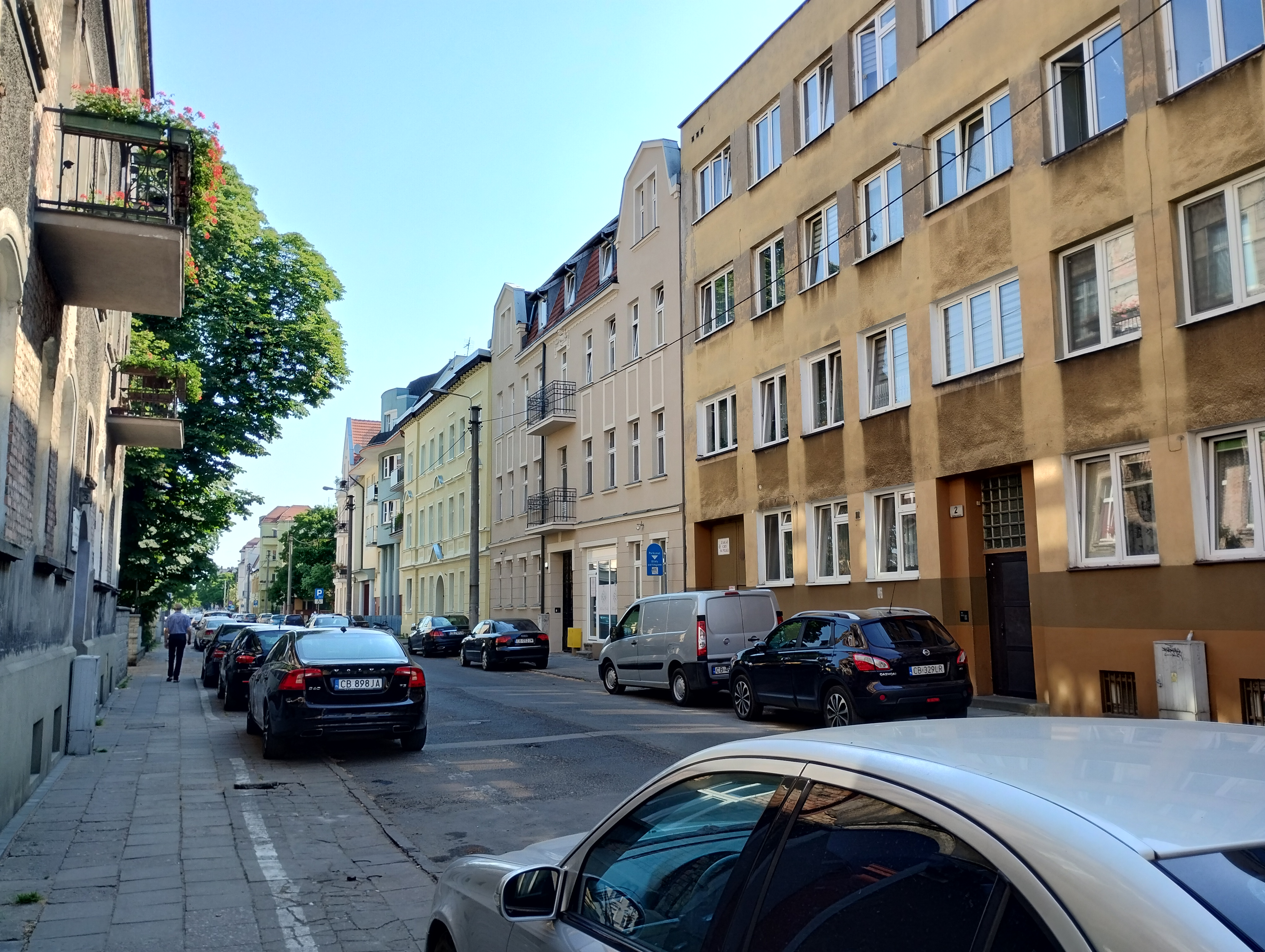
- Eastern frontages, view from Świętojańska street crossing

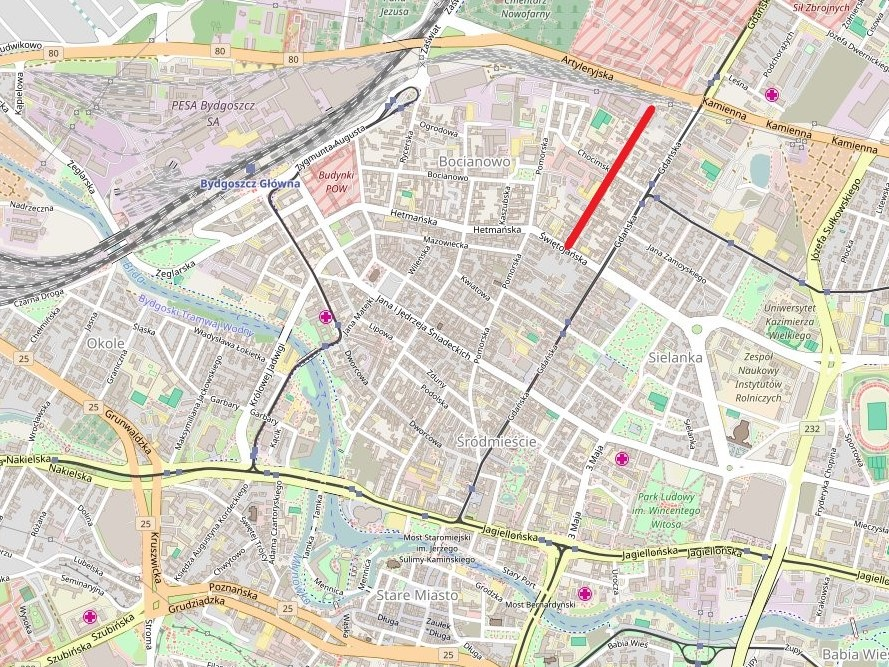
- Tadeusza Kościuszki street highlighted on a map
- Native name: Ulica Tadeusza Kościuszki w Bydgoszczy (Polish)
- Former names: Königstraße, Markgraf Gero Straße
- Part of: Bocianowo district
- Namesake: Tadeusz Kościuszko
- Owner: City of Bydgoszcz
- Length: 600 m (2,000 ft)
- Width: c. 10 metres (33 ft)
- Location: Bydgoszcz, Poland
- Coordinates: 53°08′07″N 18°00′38″E

Construction
- Construction start: 1880s

Tadeusza Kościuszki street is a 600 metres (2,000 ft) long avenue in the northern part of Bydgoszcz. Its houses display various architectural styles (Eclecticism, Neo-classicism, Art Nouveau, Modernism). The path is a witness of the end-of-19th-century industrial activity of the city.

== Location ==
Located downtown, the street follows a south west to north east track, parallel to Gdańska street. Starting from Świętojańska street, it crosses Chocimska Street and ends when reaching a derelict railway to the north.

== History ==
The street first appeared on maps between 1880 and 1900. At the time, the railway from Bydgoszcz main station to Fordon and Toruń, running along present day Kamienna street, prevented any further extension to the north. Nowadays, this railroad track disappeared: the only left vestiges end up at the crossing Kościuszki street.

The opening of the street enabled, above all, to develop the area located between Gdańska Street in the east and several barracks, to the north and the west (Pomorska street).

=== Naming ===
During its existence, the street bore the following names:

- 1880s-1920: Königstraße (English: King's street)
- 1920-1939: Ulica Tadeusza Kościuszki
- 1939-1945: Markgraf Gero Straße
- Since 1945 Ulica Tadeusza Kościuszki.

== Main areas and edifices ==
=== Tenement at 14 Świętojańska Street, corner with Kościuszki street ===
1912

Early Modern architecture

The first owner was Veronika Szeszinski, the widow of laborer (German: arbeiter).

Although the straight lines of the facade tend to reveal early modernist trends, one can still notice the Art Nouveau influence in the round bay window or the wooden pitch roof visible on top of the frontage onto Kościuszki street. Furthermore, the entrance on Świętojańska street kept preserved a beautiful wrought iron grille bearing the date of "1907".

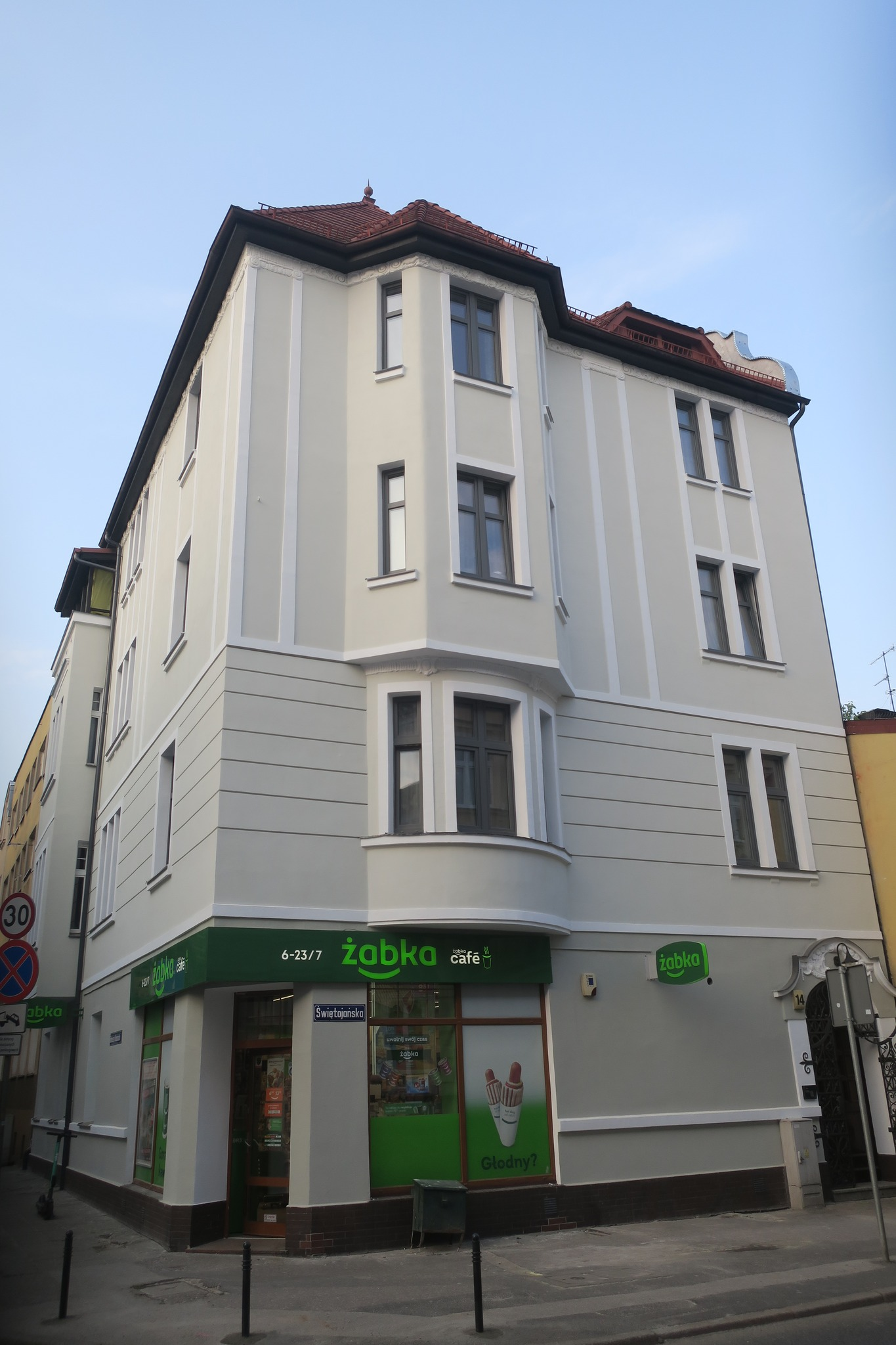
View from the street

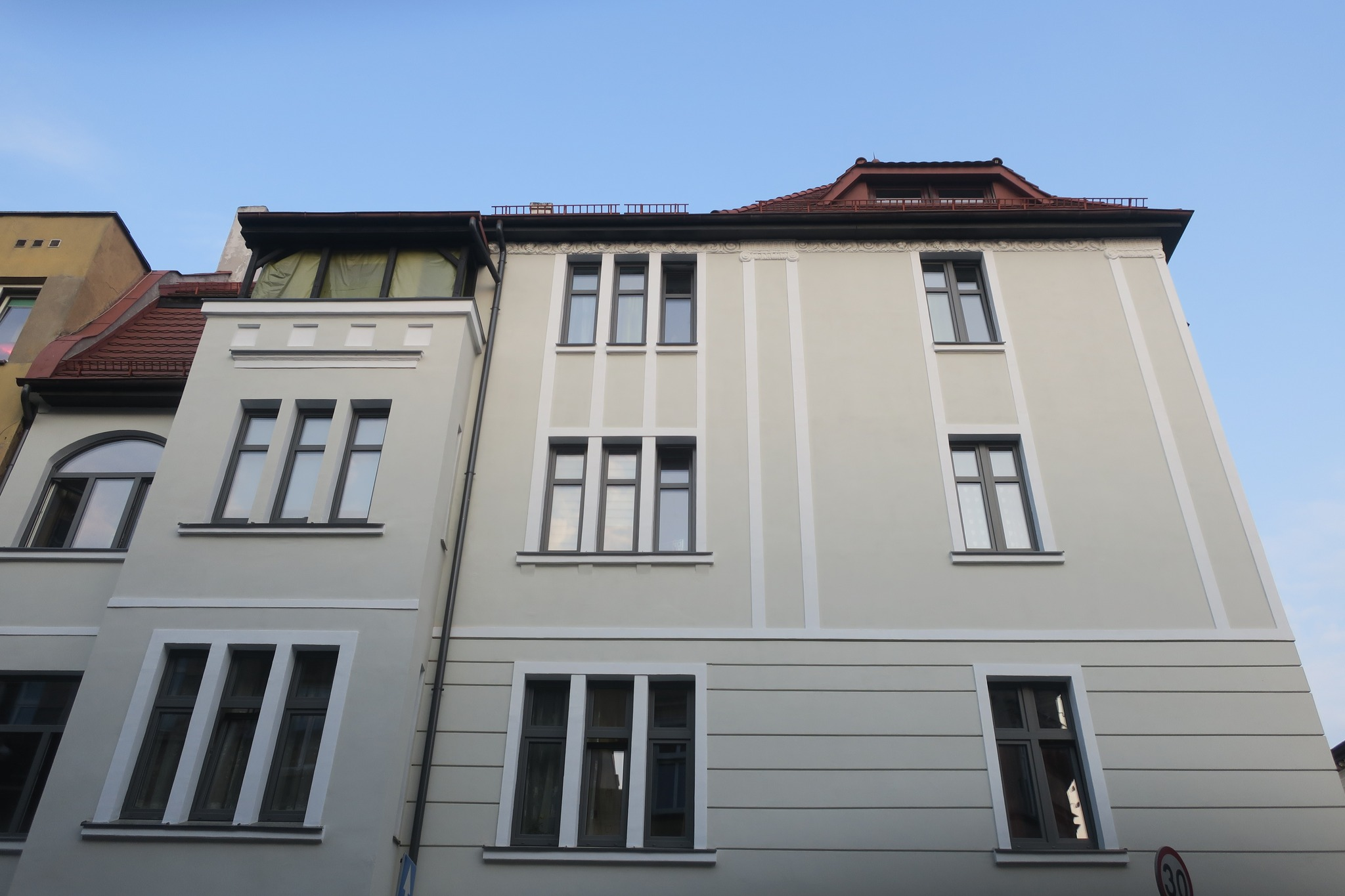
Facade on Kościuszki street

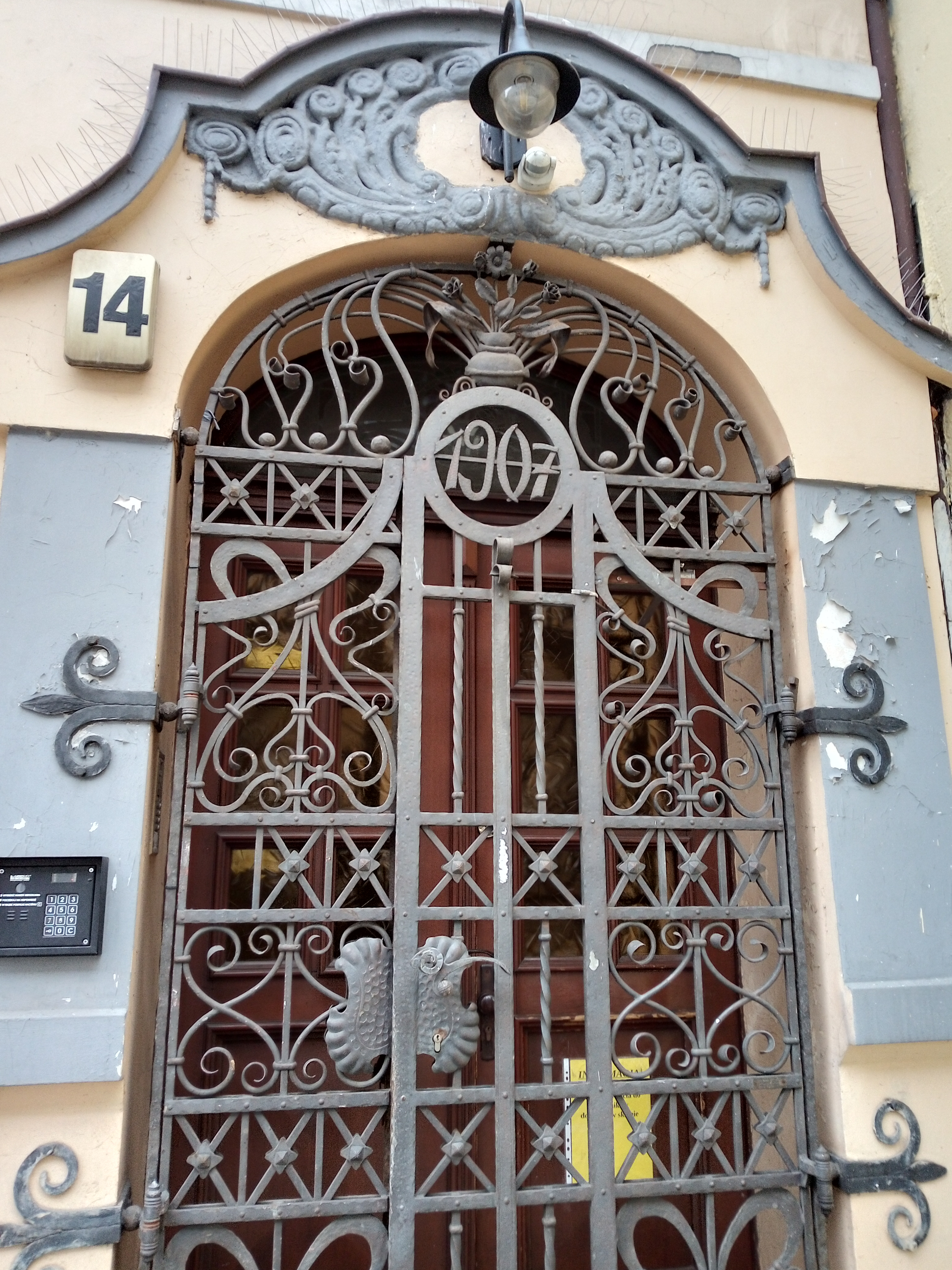
Grilled entrance door

=== Tenement at 16 Świętojańska Street, corner with Kościuszki street ===
1888-1889

Eclecticism

The commissioner of the building was Julius Schlauke, living at "10 Brunnenstraße" (today's Chwytowo street). He was a restaurateur in the nearby city of Ostromecko, east of Bydgoszcz, located along the Vistula river.

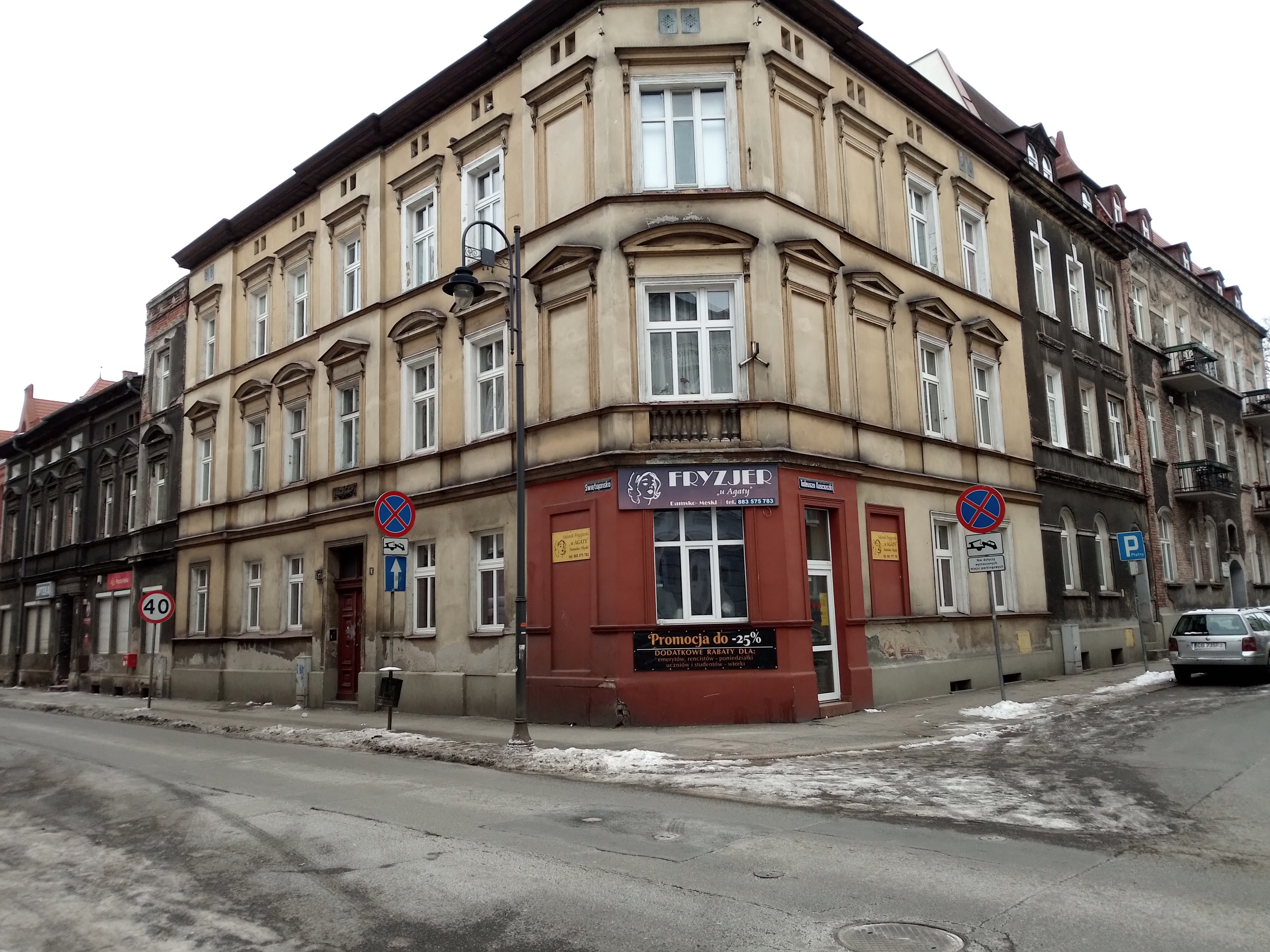
Corner view of the building

=== Tenement at 1 ===
1904

Eclecticism

The owner was Ludomira Schirmer, the widow of a mail employee.

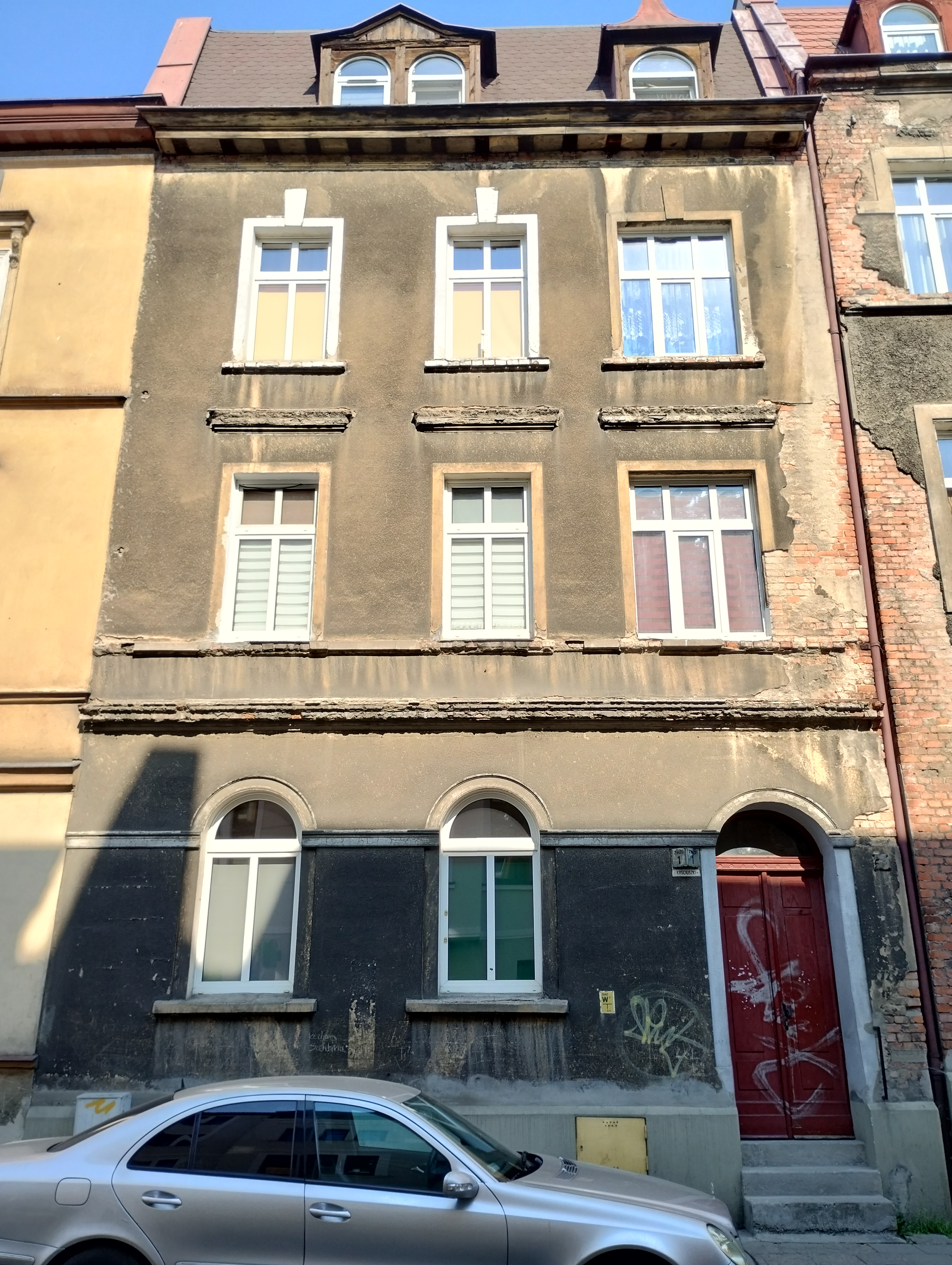
View of the facade from the street

=== Tenement at 2 ===
1930s

Modernism

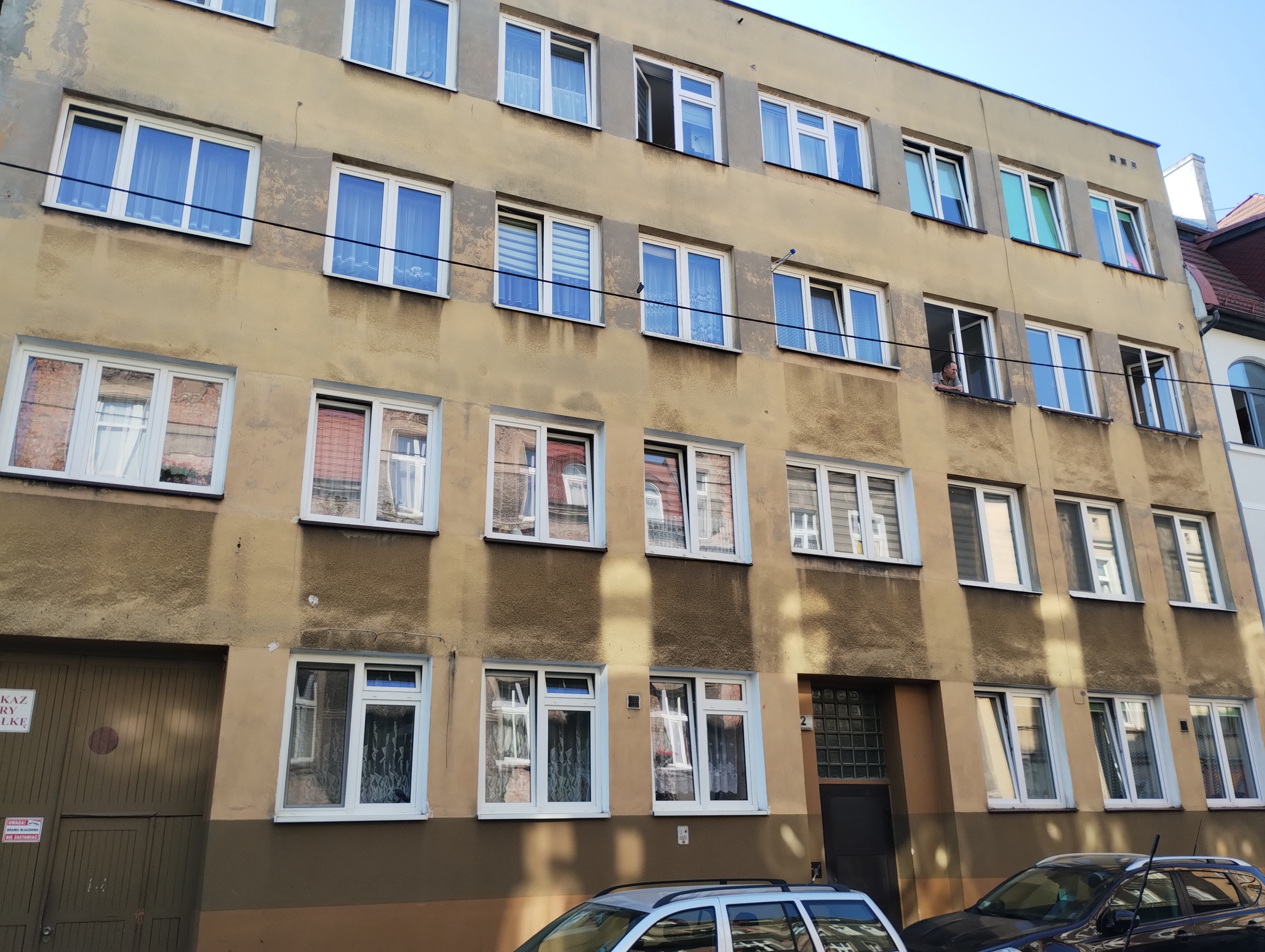
View of the facade from the street

=== Tenement at 3 ===
1905

Art Nouveau

Then registered at "2 Königstraße", the owner was Ludomira Schirmer, also landlord at Nr 1.

Although damaged, the top of the facade still displays some Art Nouveau motifs: some floral patterns and festoons.

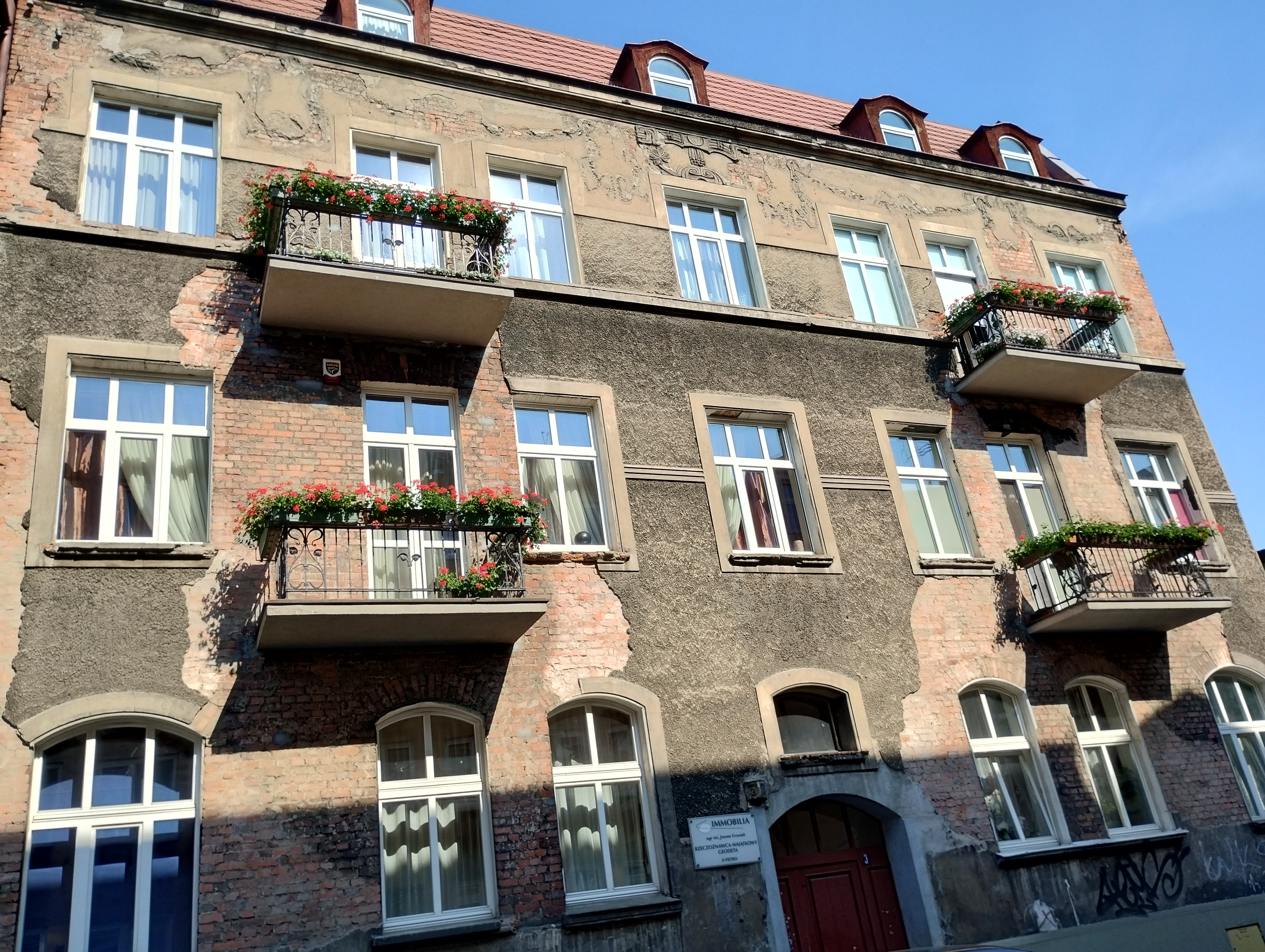
Main frontage on the street

=== Tenement at 4 ===
1905-1907, by Władysław Gatza and Anton Czarnecki

Art Nouveau

Then registered at "58 Königstraße", the first landlord was Konstantin Bogulawski, a journeyman roofer.

Recently renovated in 2022, the building had probably more decorations. The facade displays balconies, stacked above the entrance, closed by an wrought iron grille gate. The top of the frontage is decorated with an Art Nouveau festoon motif and balanced by the presence on both sides of wall gables.

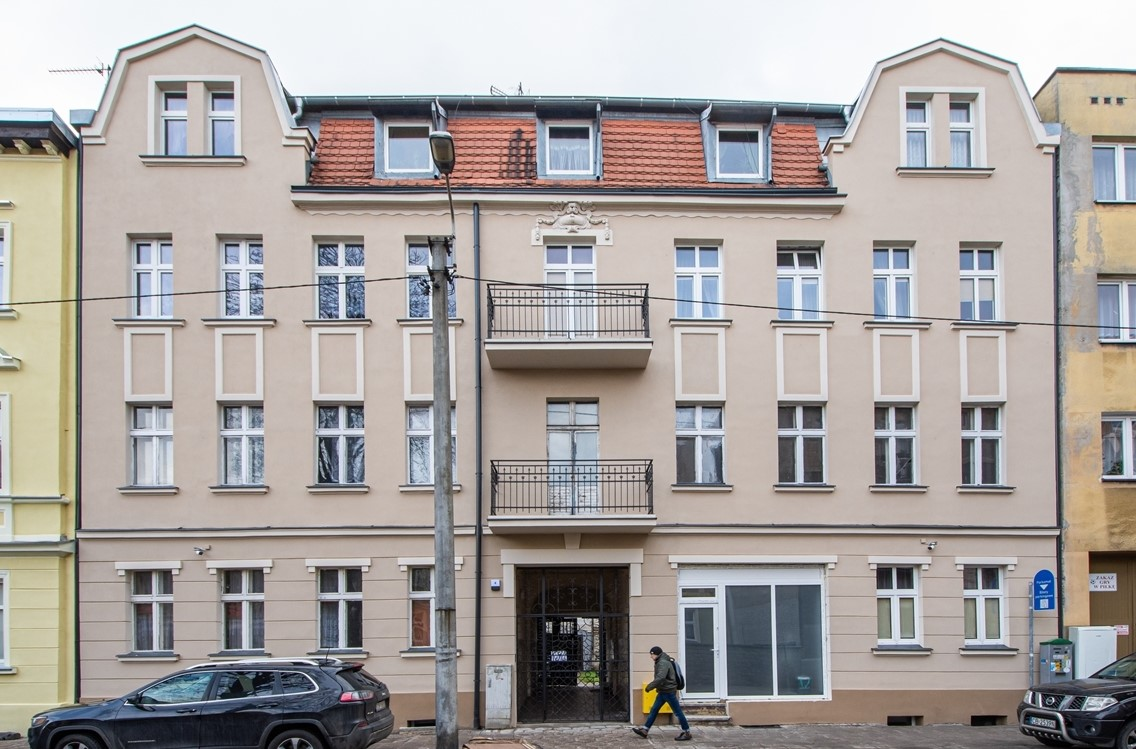
Refurbished frontage

=== Villa at 5 ===
1892-1893

Eclecticism

Adolf Hartkopf, a secretary in the railways, was the fist landlord of this large villa. Living at Nr.5, Hartkopf was also owner of the adjoining villa at Nr.7.

The large house is slightly offset from the street main frontage, creating a small front yard. The eclectic facade boasts architectural details: pediments on windows, a corbel table and an adorned pedestal supporting a finial.

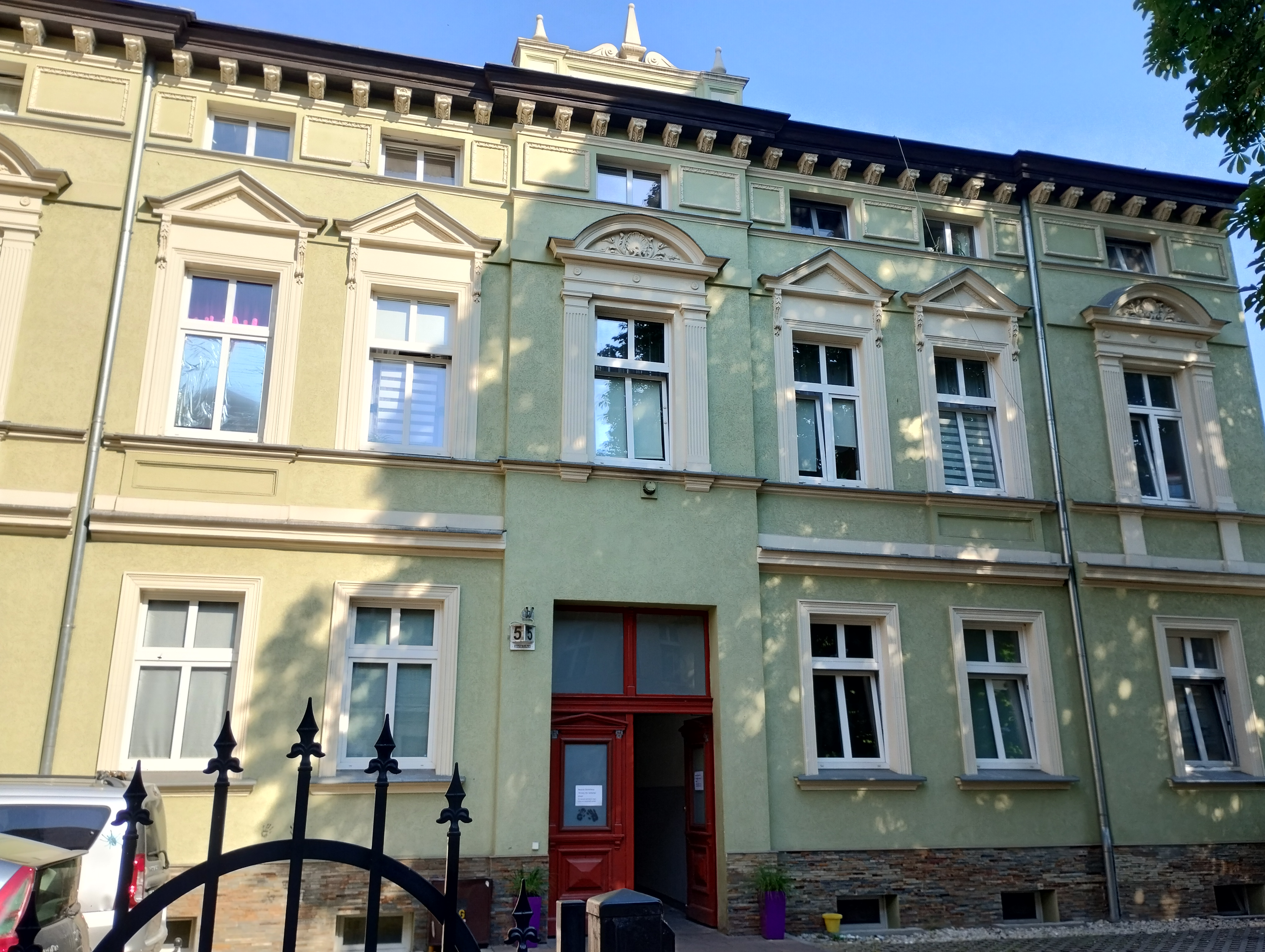
View from the street

=== Tenement at 6 ===
1893

Eclecticism

The building then registered at "57 Königstraße" was commissioned by Andreas Krahn, a postman, living at Nr. 9.

Renovated in 2022, the facade boasts lean and symmetrical features: one can notice in particular the large entrance door, topped by a fanlight.

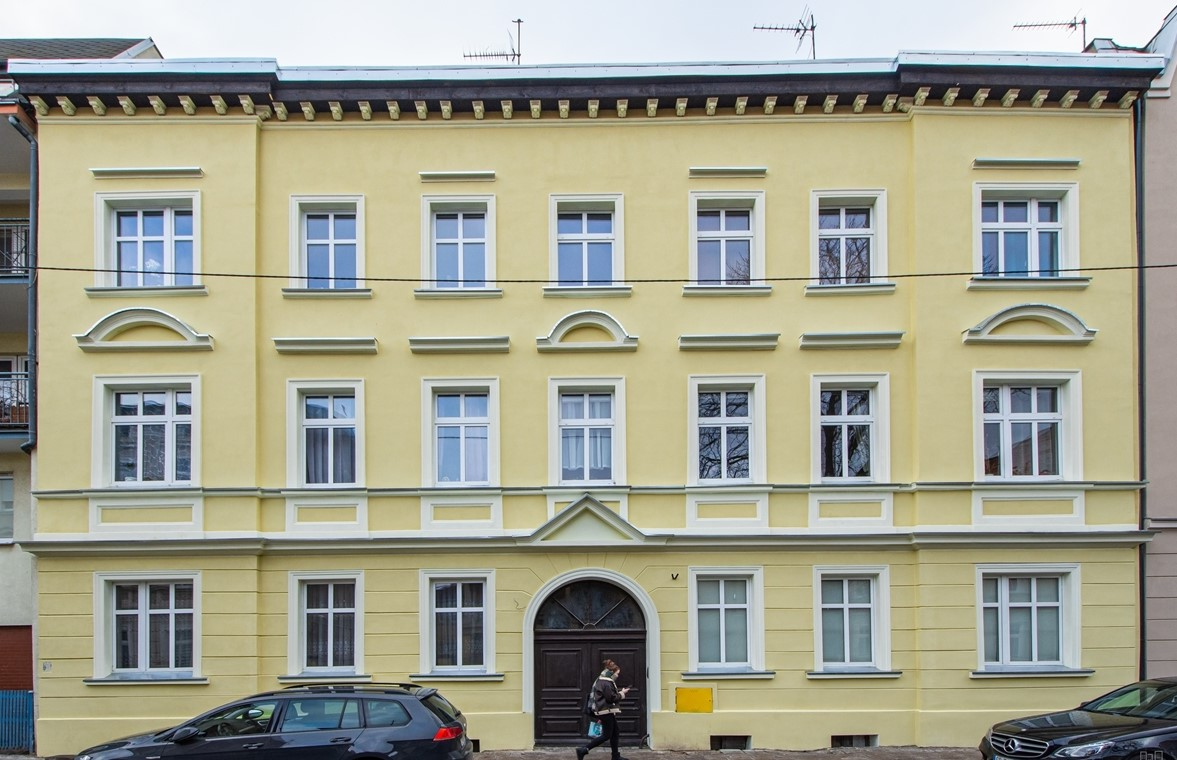
Main frontage

=== Villa at 7 ===
1889-1890

Eclecticism

Adolf Hartkopf owned and lived in this villa before moving to his next acquisition at Nr. 5 a few years after the construction of this house in the early 1890s.

The villa architecture singles out from the rest of the street abodes. With its large roof overhanging a columned loggia, its style evokes American colonial architecture.

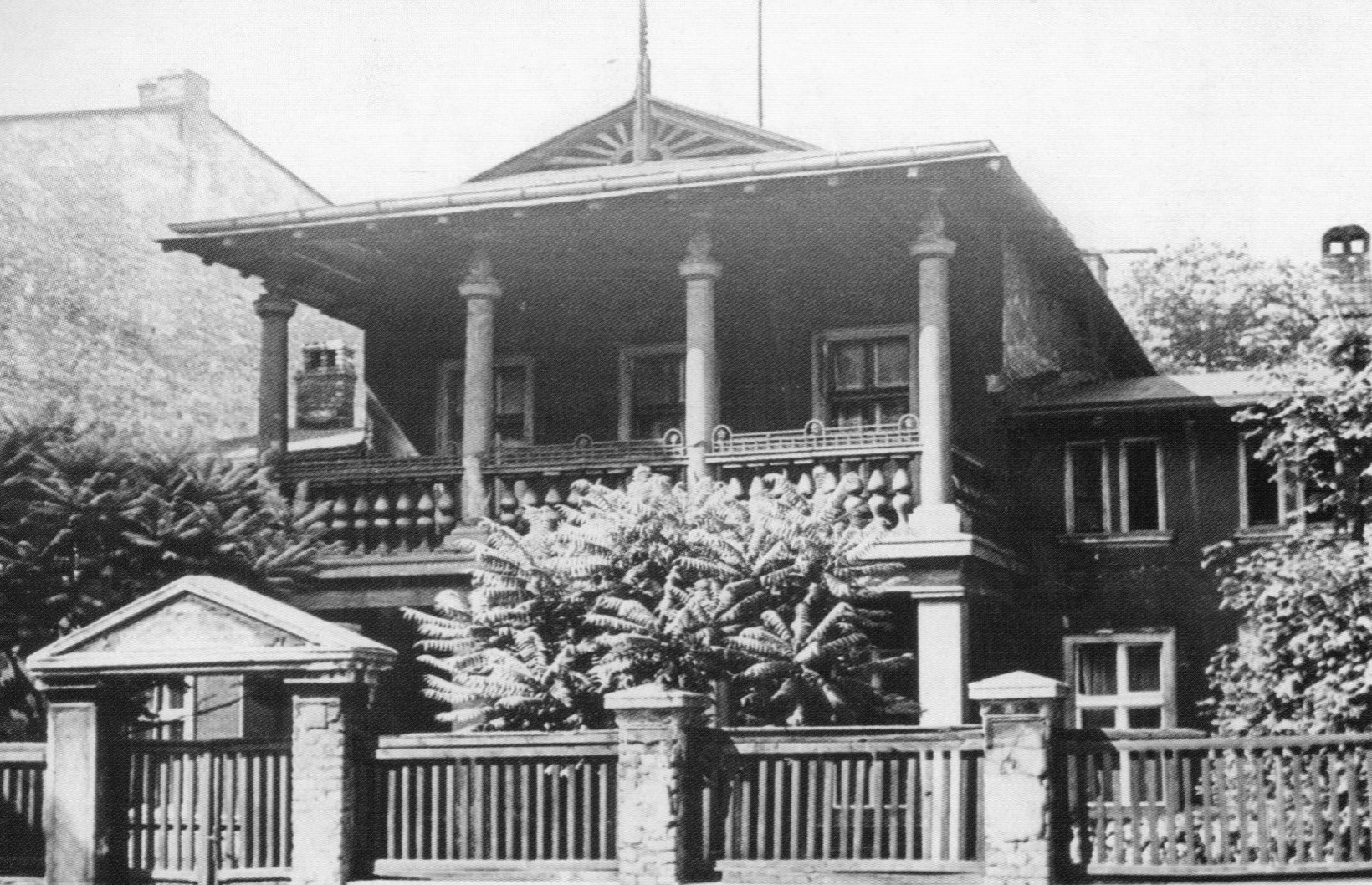
The villa ca 1930s

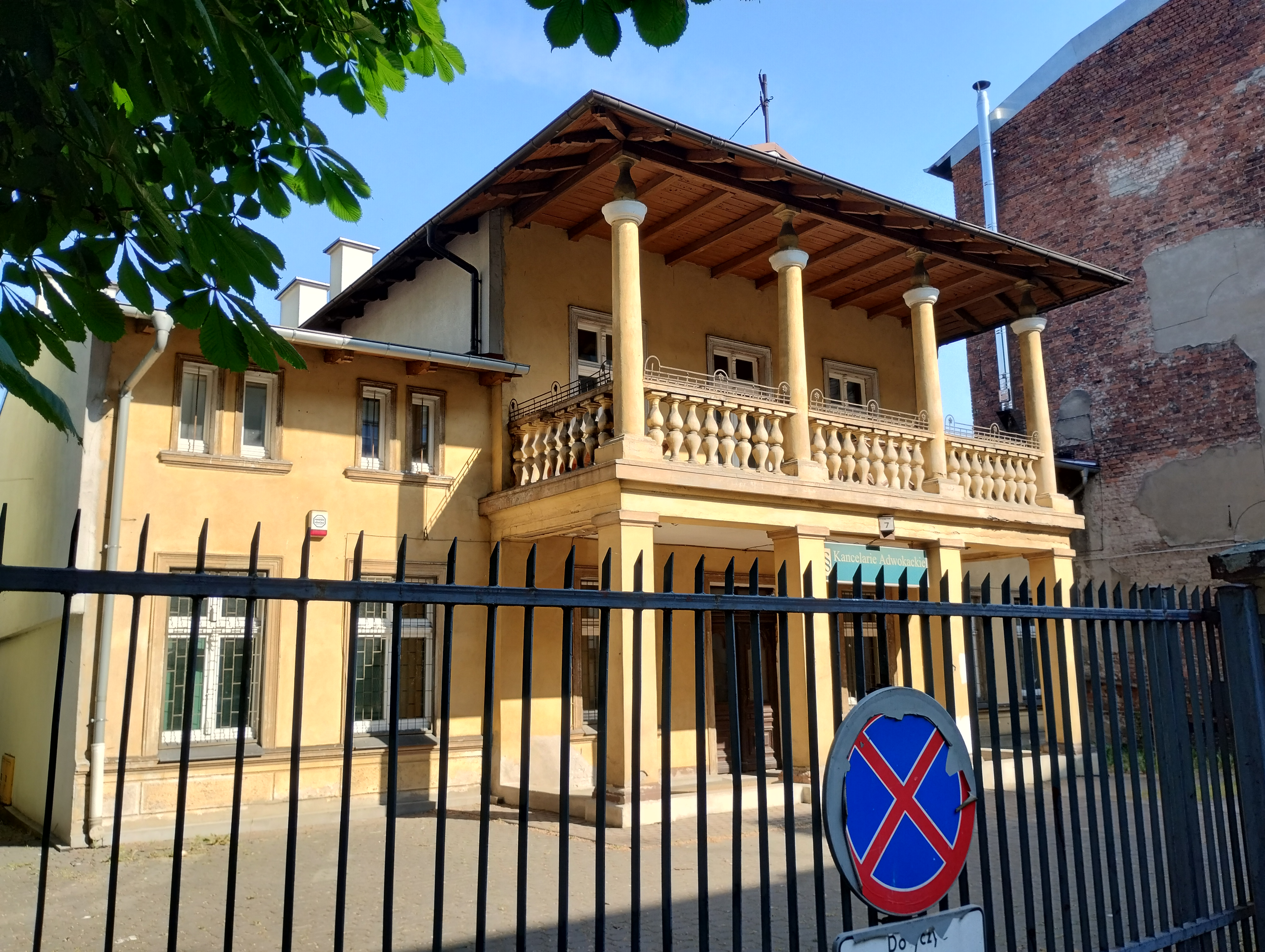
The house today

=== Tenement at 9 ===
1889-1891

Eclecticism

The building was commissioned by Andreas Krahn, a postman, also landlord of the tenement at Nr.6. The local architect Anton Hoffmann lived there in the late 1880s.

The edifice, revamped in 2022, features in particular a bossage ground floor, the original entrance grill flanked by pilasters, pediments on the first floor and a corbel table.

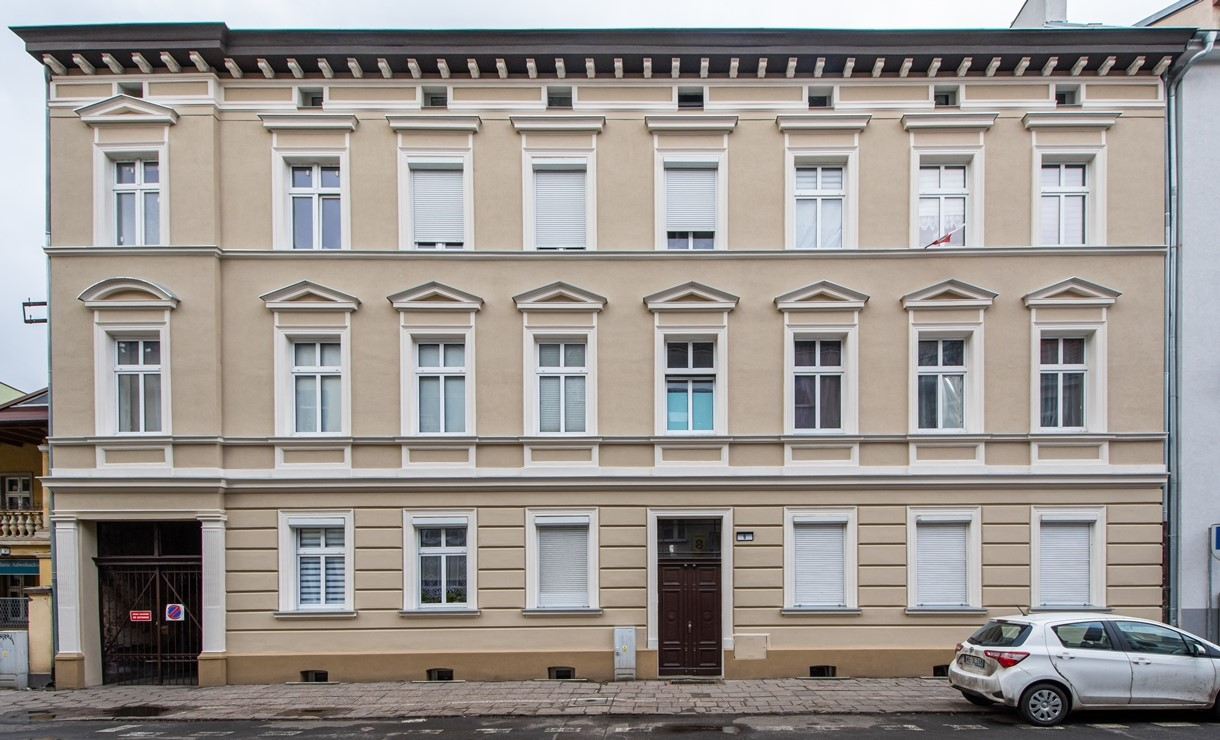
Main frontage

=== Tenement at 10 ===
1910-11, by Paul Prokopp

Late Art Nouveau

The trading company "Hermann Onck" was the commissioner of the building.

Refurbished in 2022, the tenement presents two almost-similar shifted bodies boasting balconies, avant-corps, oeil-de-boeufs and wall gables.

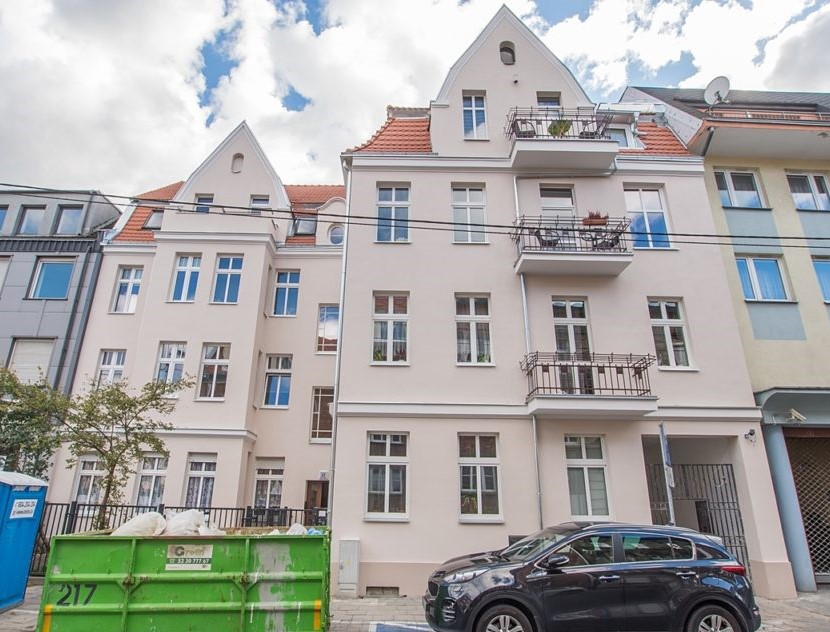
Main frontage

=== Tenement at 11 ===
1930s

Modernism

The current building replaced another which has been standing on that plot since the 1880s.

The features of the tenement, refurbished in the early 2020s, are closer to the Art Deco Streamline Moderne, en vogue in this period.

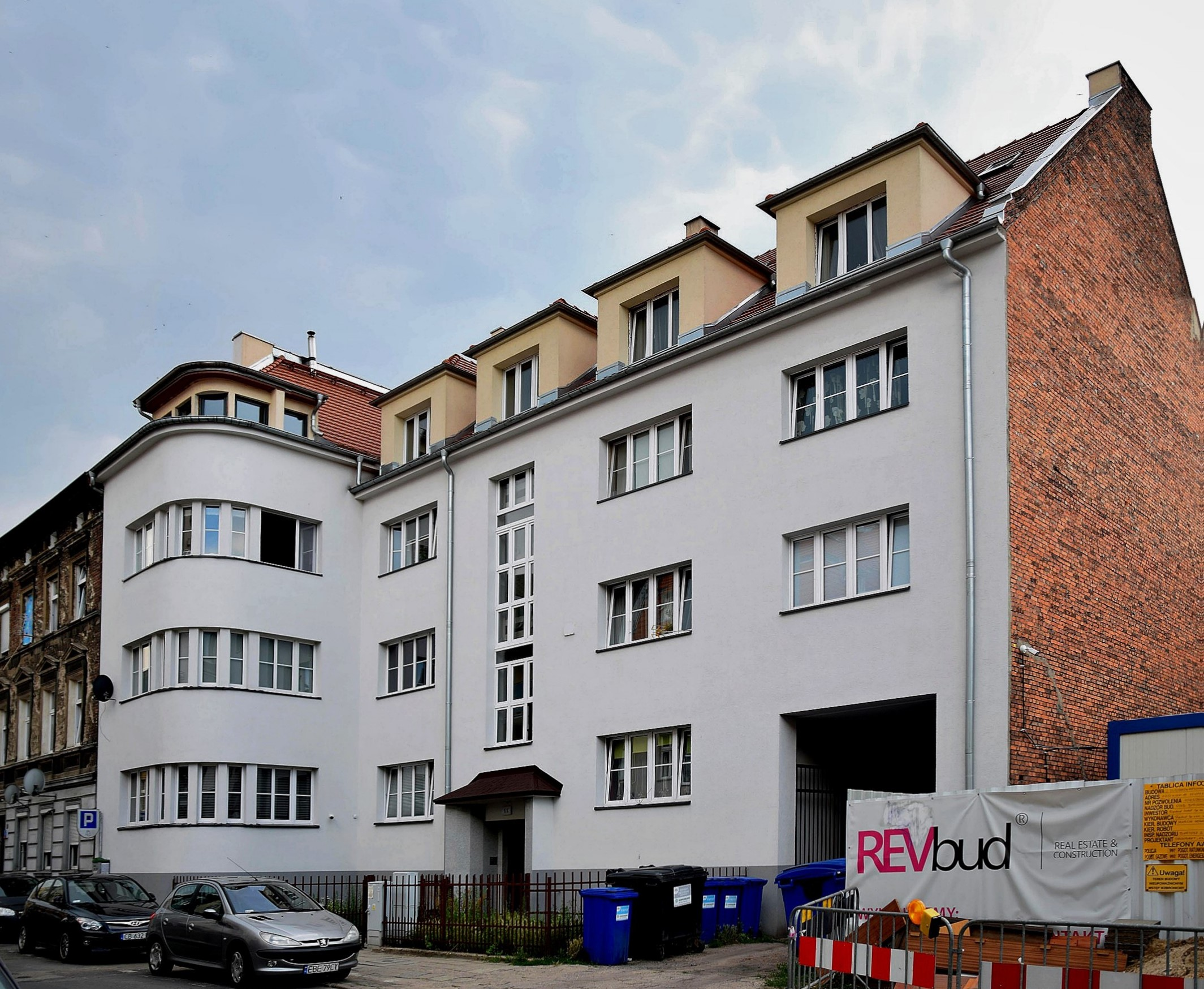
View of the facade from the street

=== Tenement at 18 ===
1911-1912, by Georg Baesler

Late Art Nouveau, early Modernism

The building had for first landlord Johann Kujawski, declared as "masonry builder".

The tenement mixes Art Nouveau details (ornated main door, round top windows, round bay window, festoons and floral cartouches) and early modernist features (vertical lines, oblong openings).

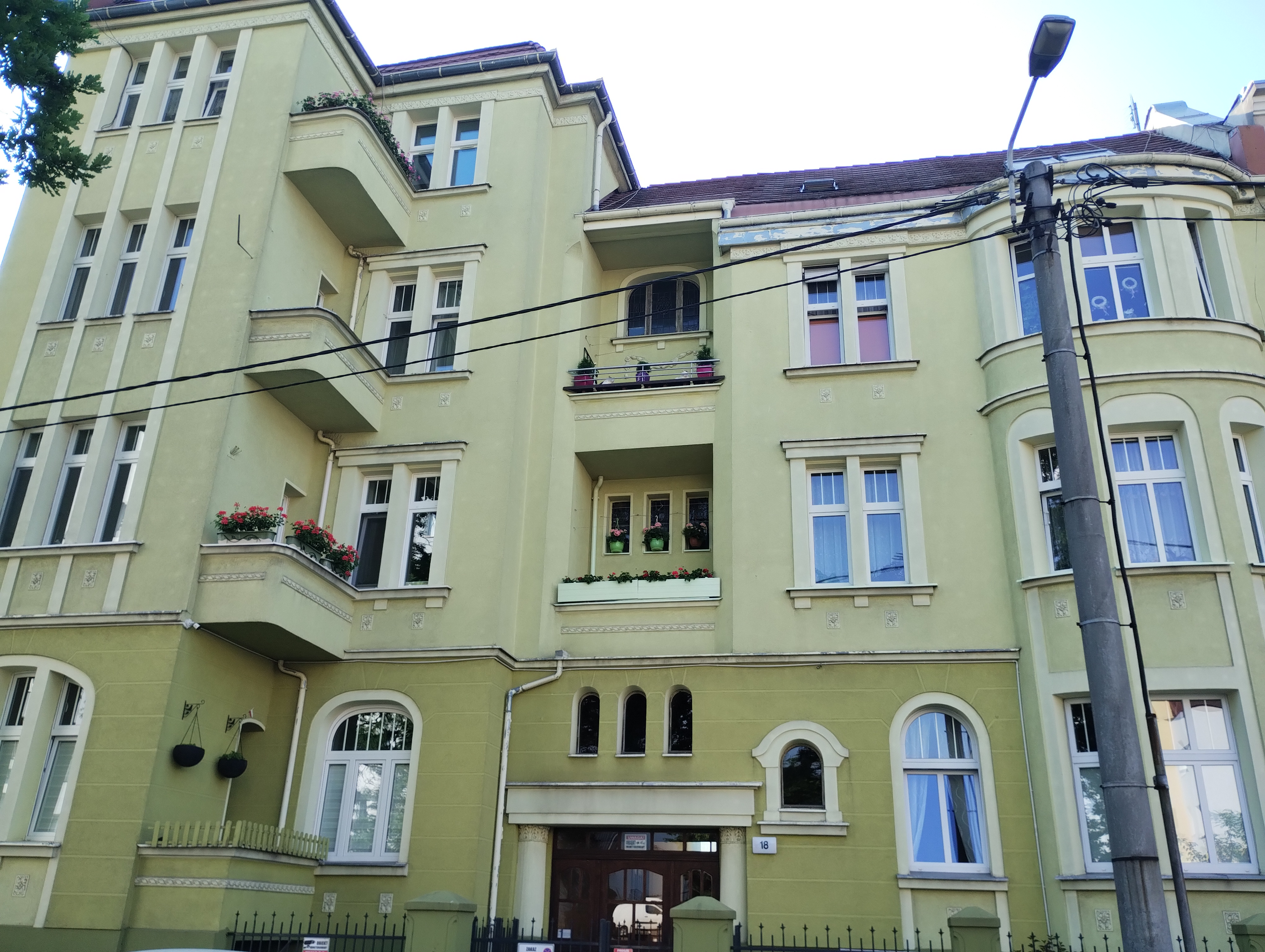
Main frontage

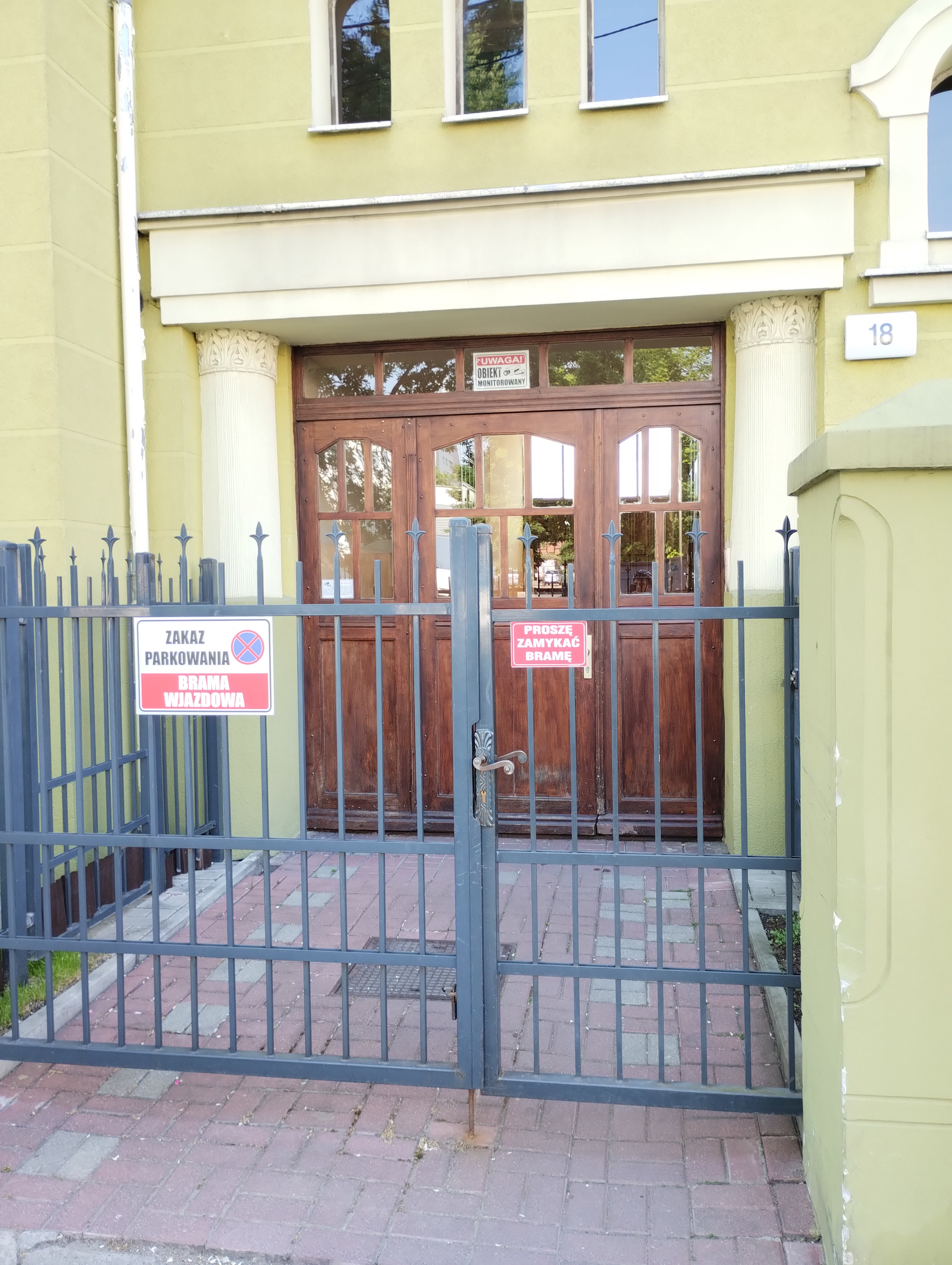
Door at 18

=== Building at 20 ===
1886-1887

Eclecticism

The edifice is one of the oldest original ones in the street. It was ordered by Adolf Grabarski, a builder living at "27 Prinzenhöhe" (today's Lubelska street).

The one-storey building, renovated in 2019, presents eclectic architectural details.

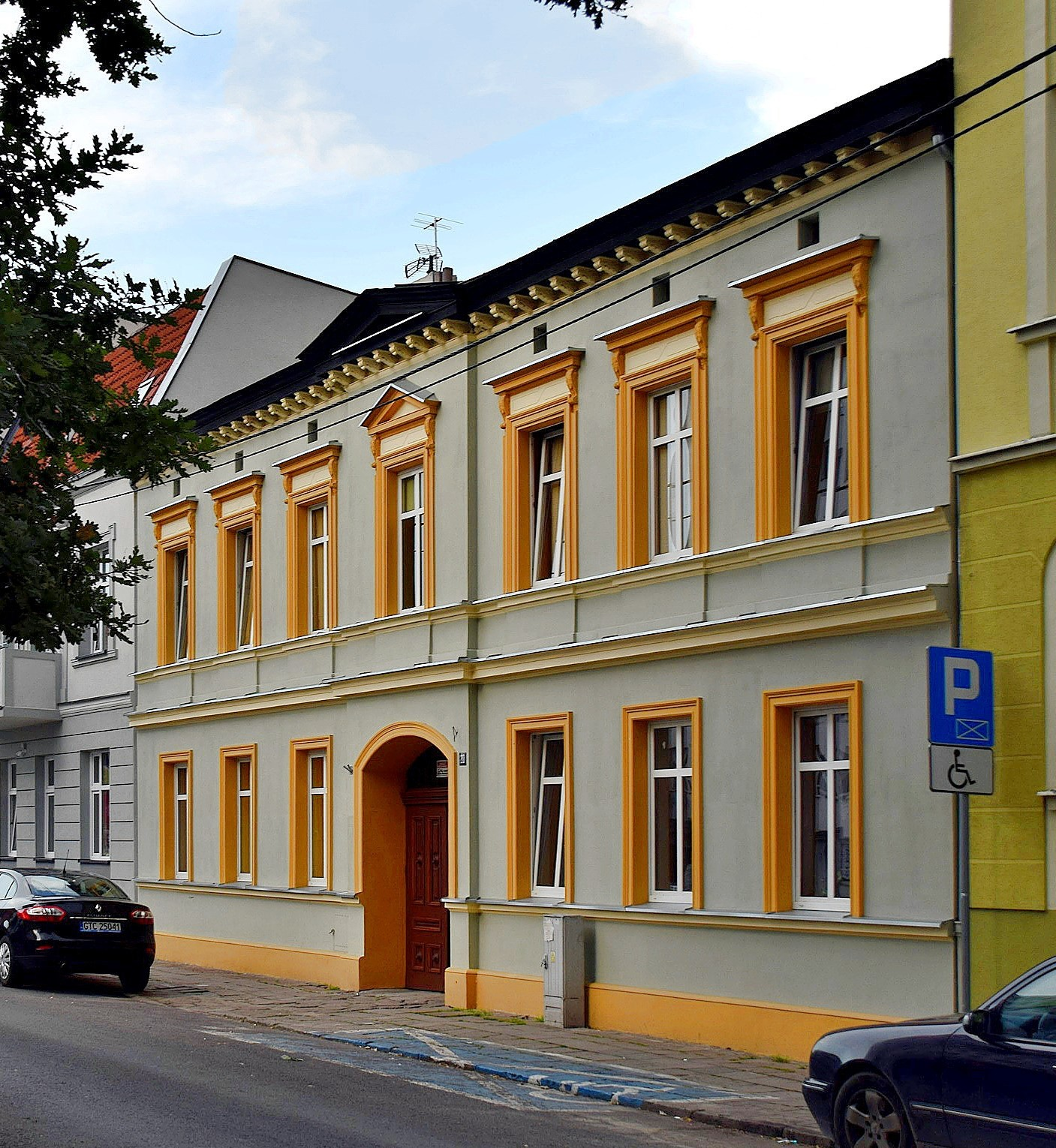
Nr.20 from the street

=== Tenement at 22 ===
1905

Art Nouveau

August Winter, a merchant, was the first owner of the edifice.

The revamped ensemble comprises:

- on the left side, a one-level house with a wrought-iron balcony and an Art Nouveau wooden entrance door;
- on the right side, a two-storey tenement featuring pilasters and an adorned top gable.
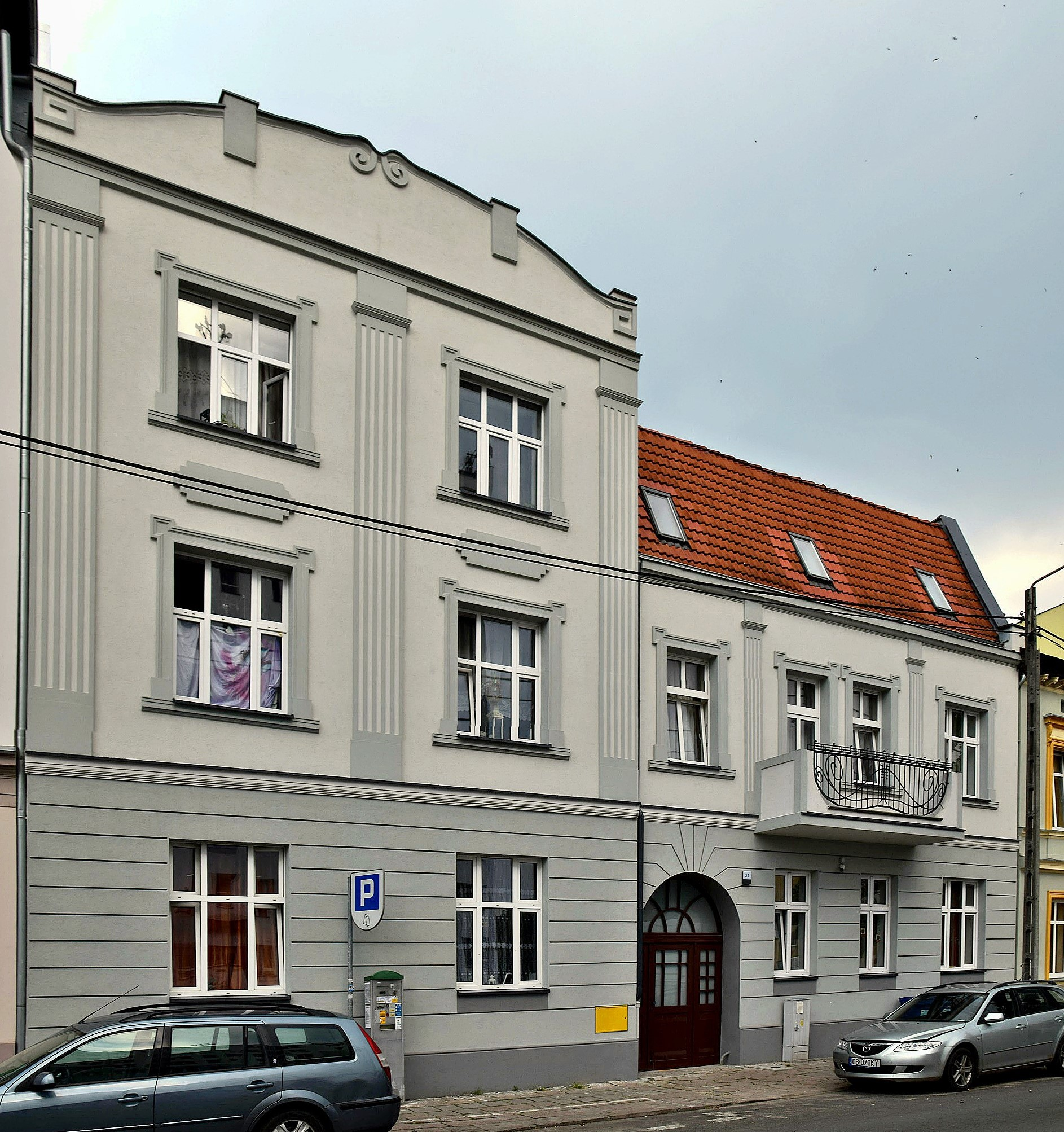
Ensemble at Nr.22

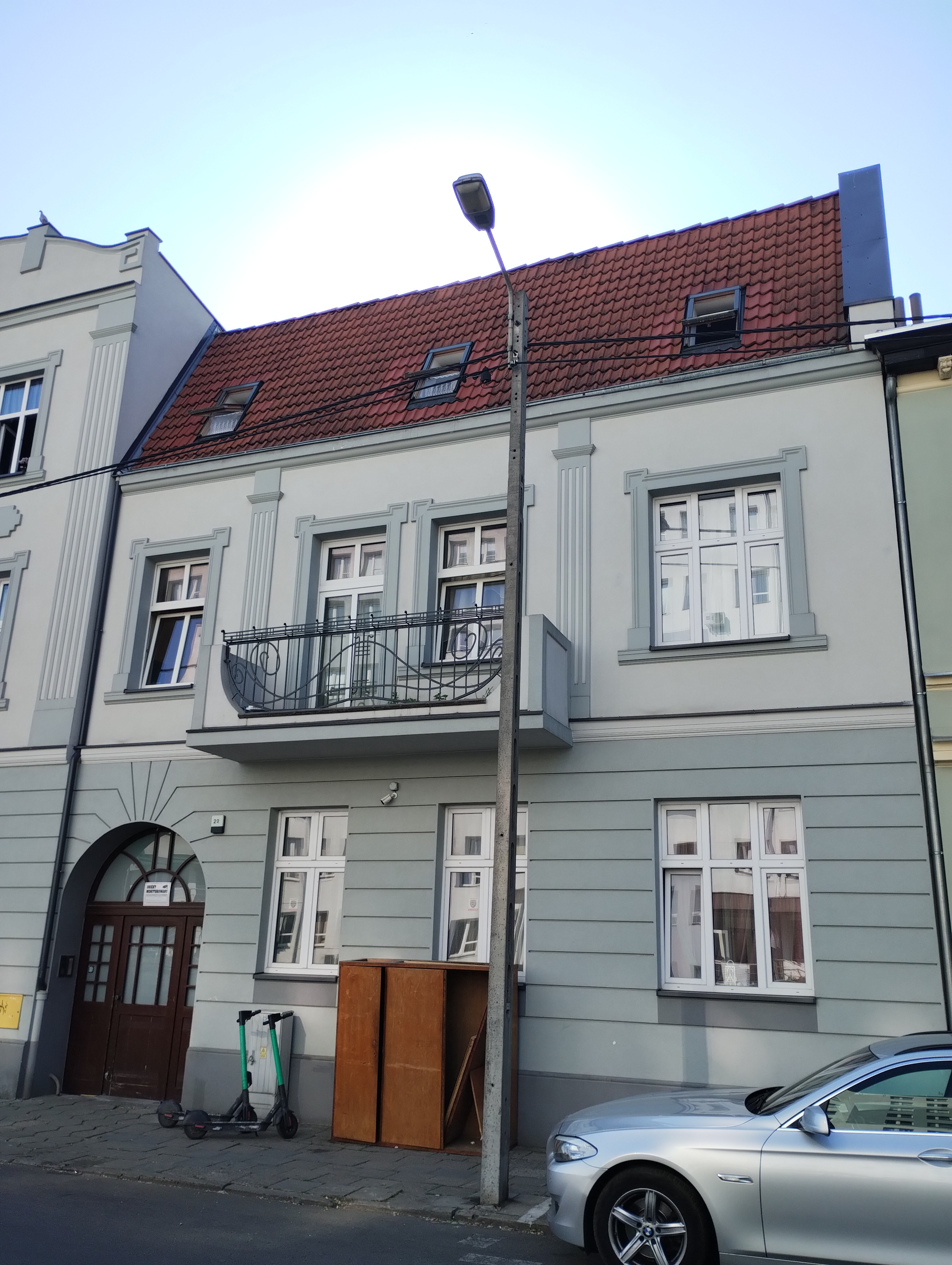
House at Nr.22

=== Tenement at 24 ===
1910-1911

Late Art Nouveau, early Modernism

The tenement, then at "48 Königstraße", had been commissioned by Johann Czaplewski, a master painter, who had his studio there.

The large renovated building exposes few Art Nouveau details, but displays many architectural elements such as a large bay window overhanging the ornamented door, the two wall gables and the top eyelid dormers.

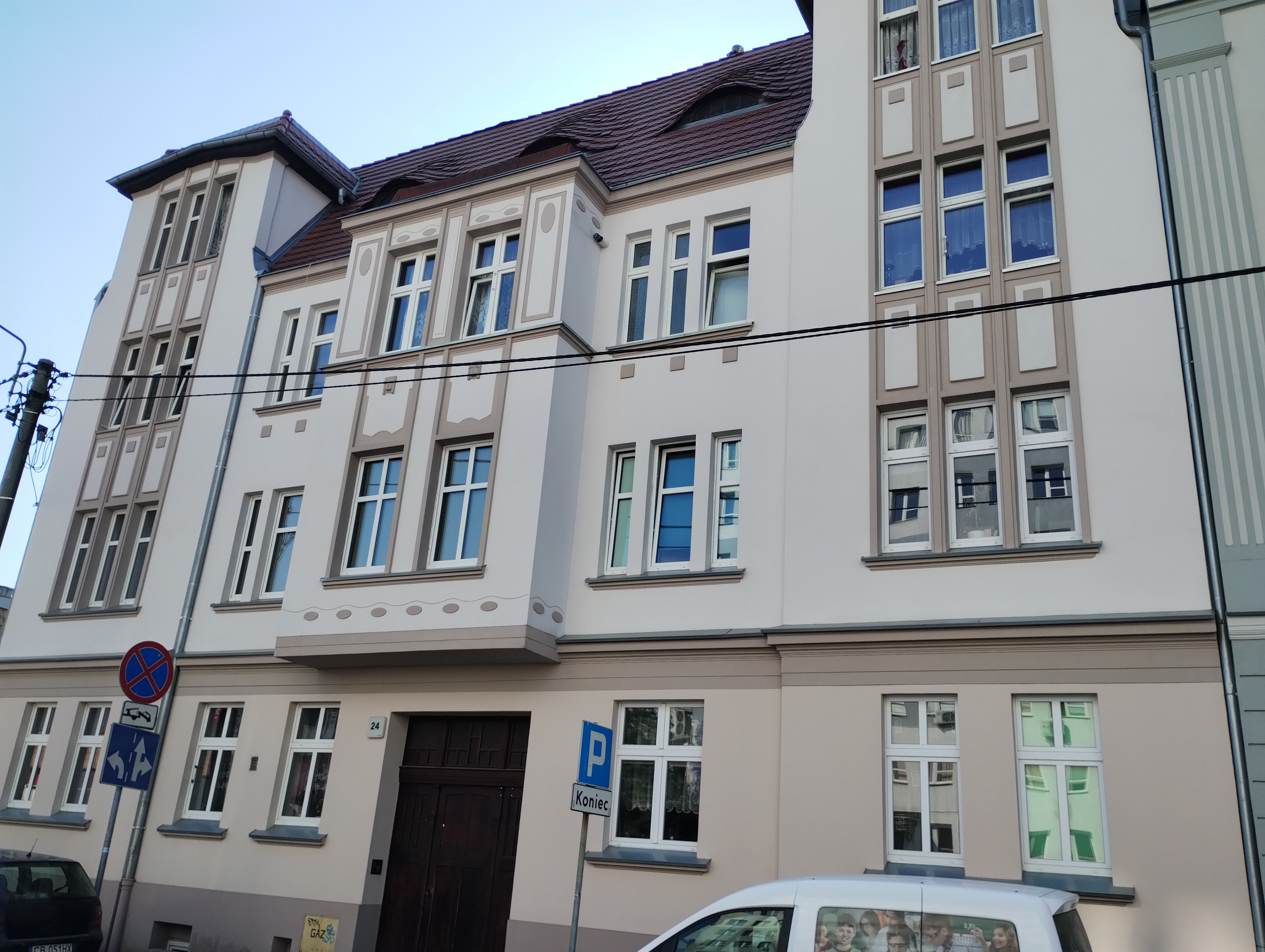
Main frontage

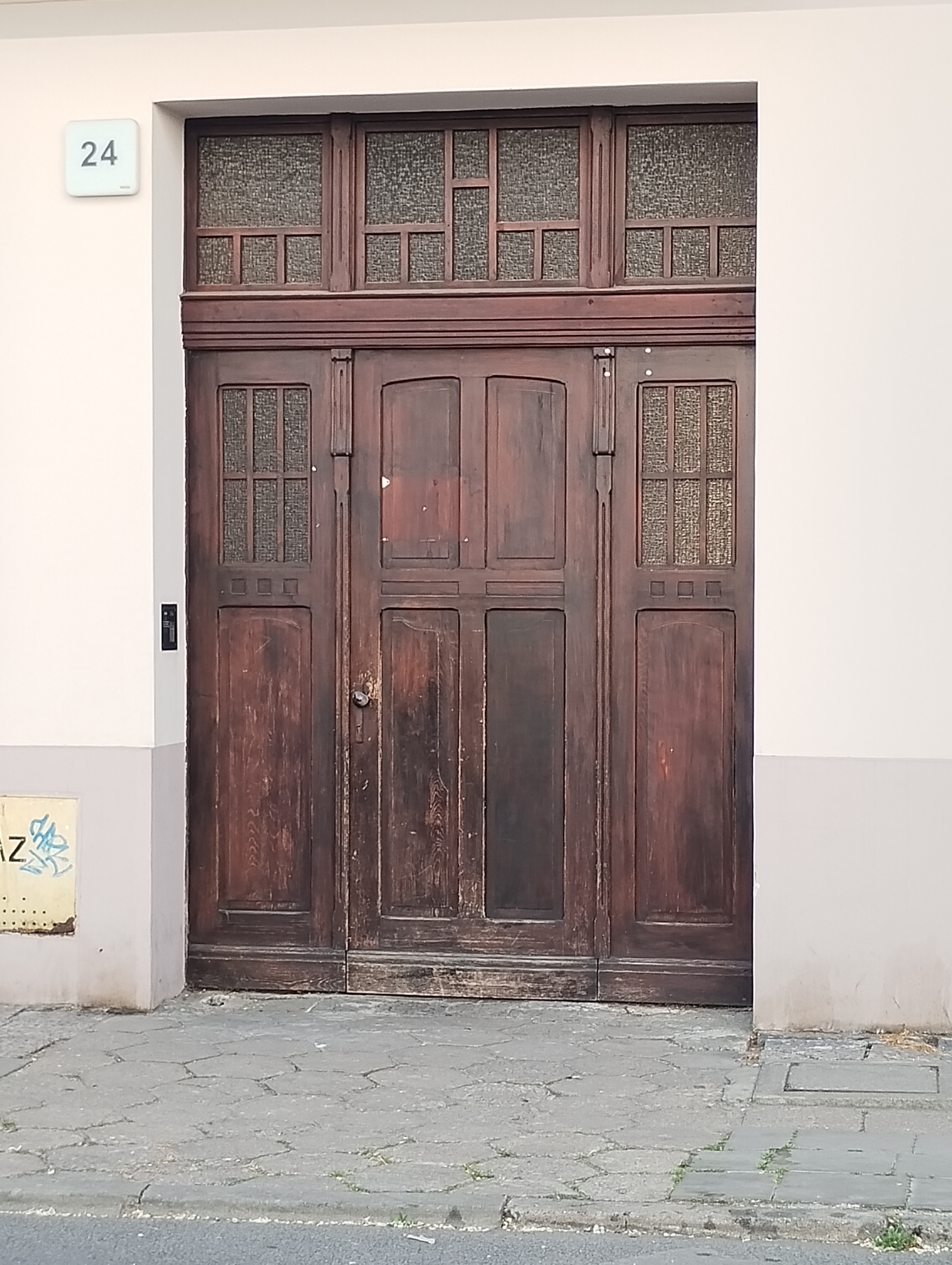
Adorned wooden door

=== Former cigar factory "Orianda" ===
In the 1910s, this large plot was occupied by the cigars and cigarettes factory Orianda, owned by Stefan Stawiński. From 1915 onwards, the company had a branch in Brodnica.

Stefan Stawiński personally bought tobacco in Russia and imported it to his factories in Bydgoszcz and Brodnica. Over the following years, the company developed dynamically. and in 1925, Stawiński expanded his business to kitchenware, under the same name.

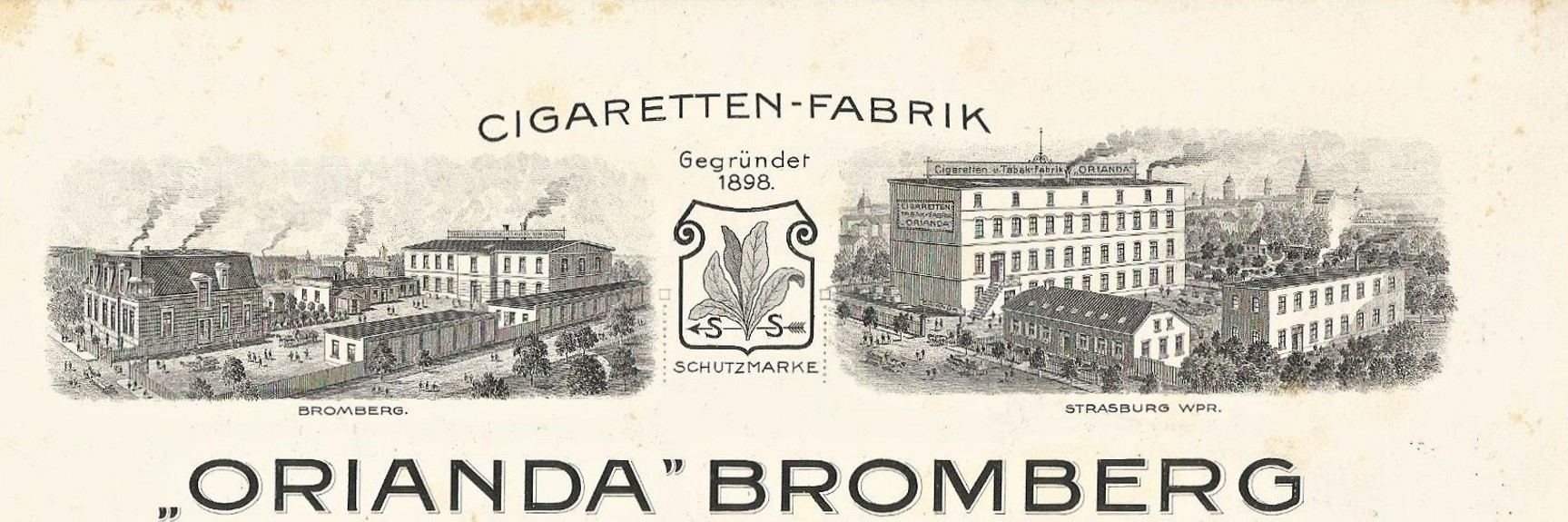
Advertisement for "Orianda", ca 1920s

=== Former factory building at 27, corner with Chocimska street ===
1906, by Paul Sellner

In 1906, a 5 hectares (12 acres) plot of land at the corner of Kościuszki and Chocimska streets, in downtown district, was bought by shoe-business entrepreneur Antoni Weynerowski to increase the capacity of his former workshop in 34 Swiętej Trojcy street (non existent today). Antoni asked architect Paul Sellner to design a modern factory complex with two storeys, an attic, facilities for workers and a freight elevator.

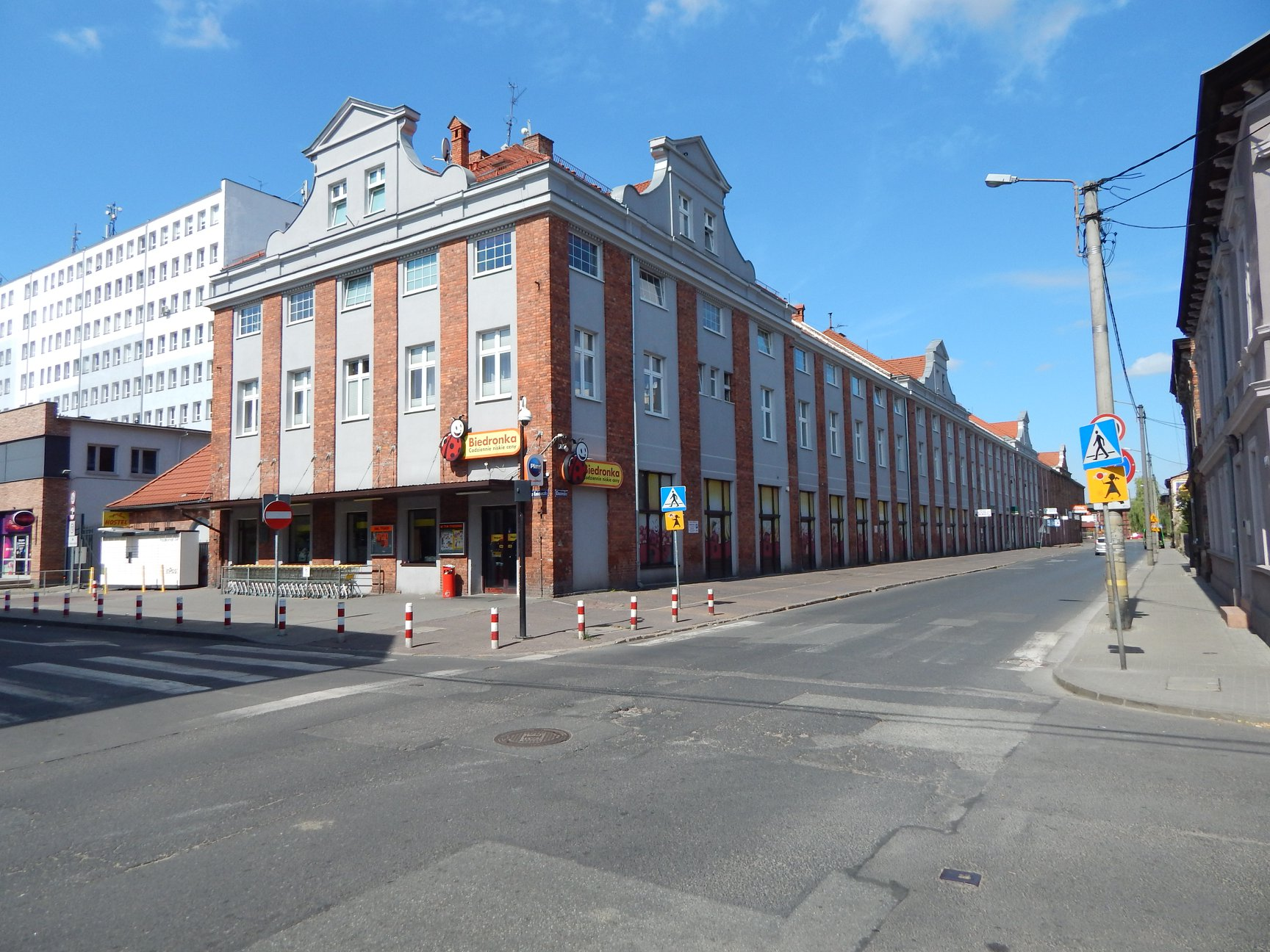
View from street crossing

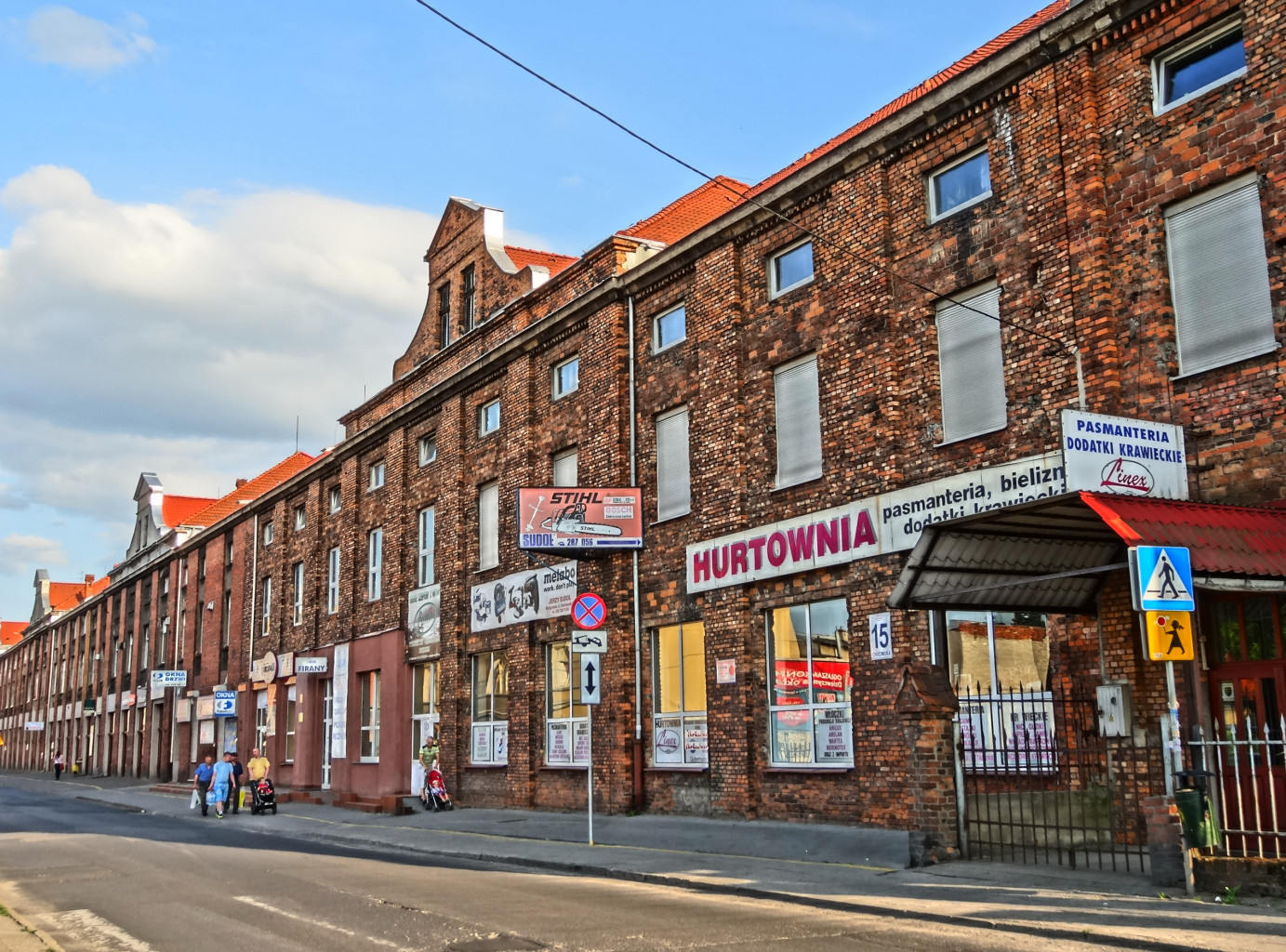
Facade Chocimska street

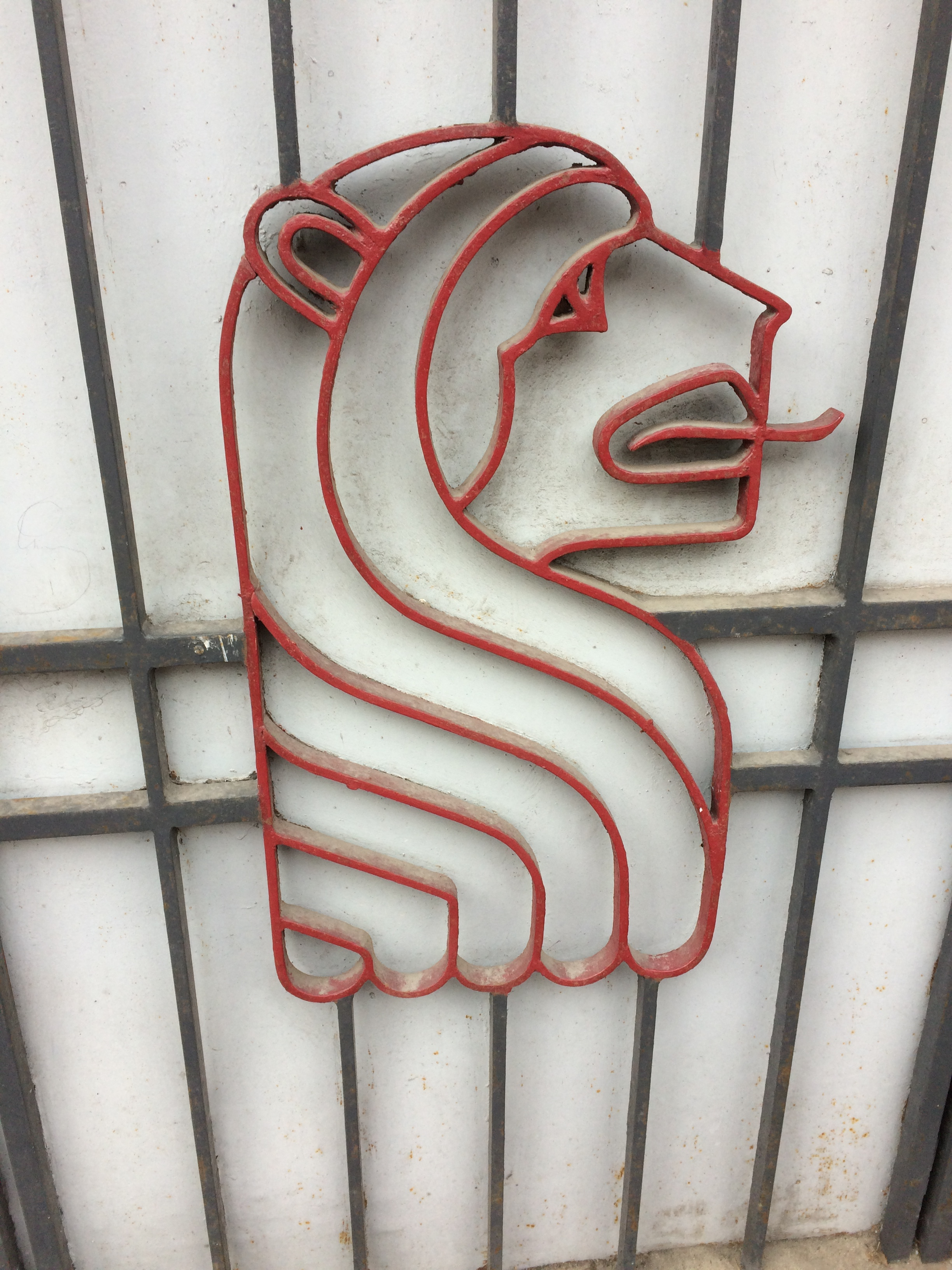
"Kobra" logo, on Kościuszki street

=== Tenement at 11 Chocimska street, corner with Kościuszki street ===
1896–1897

Eclecticism

The tenement was first listed at "Königstraße 45" (today's Kościuszki street), owned by a merchand, Friedrich Guse. At the turn of the 20th century, another merchant, Antoni Cywiński, purchased and kept it till the start of WWII.

Distinctive style facades with eclectic details (pediments, empty cartouches, bossage on the corner elevation) mixed with plain orange bricks.

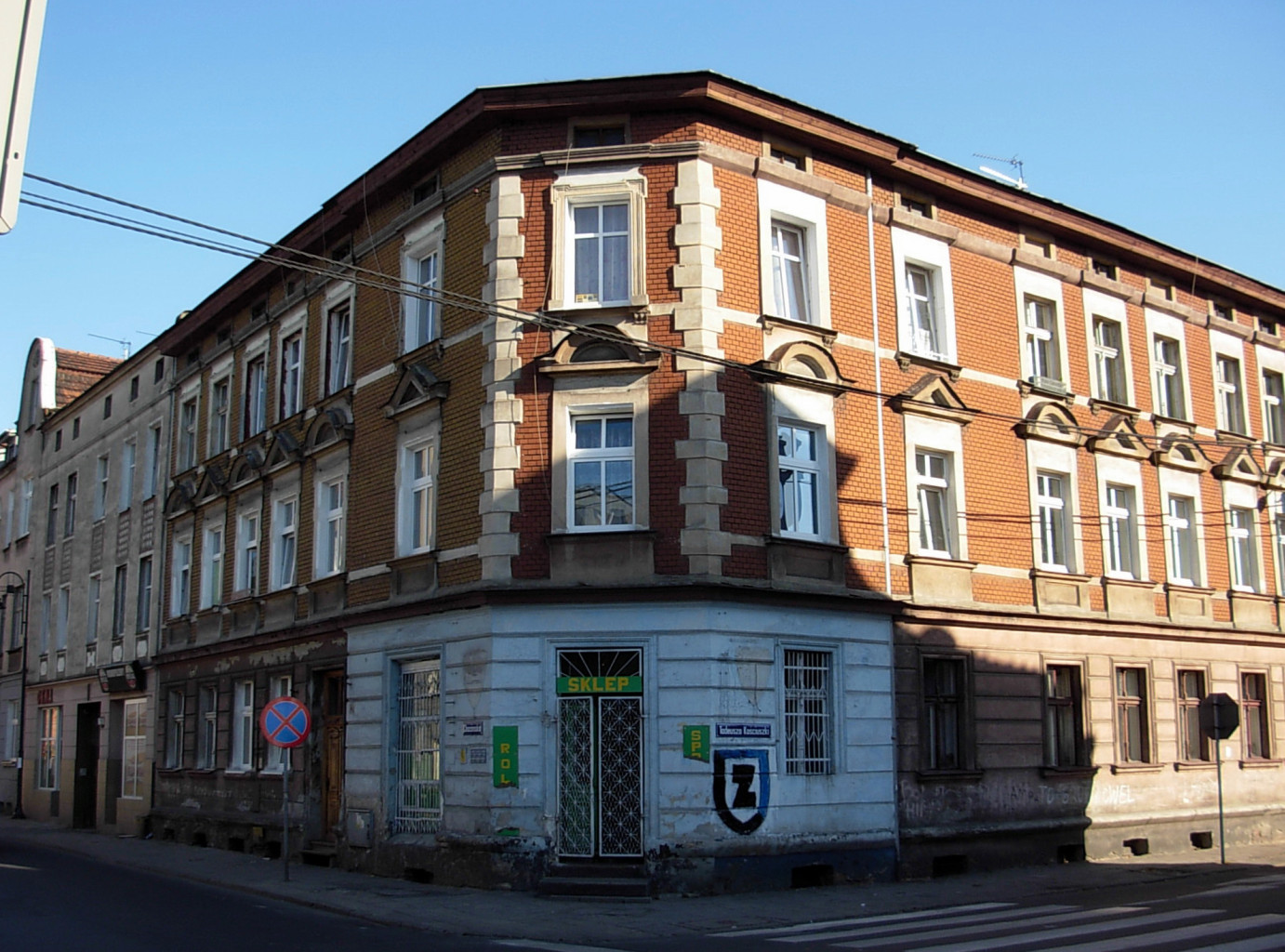
Corner view

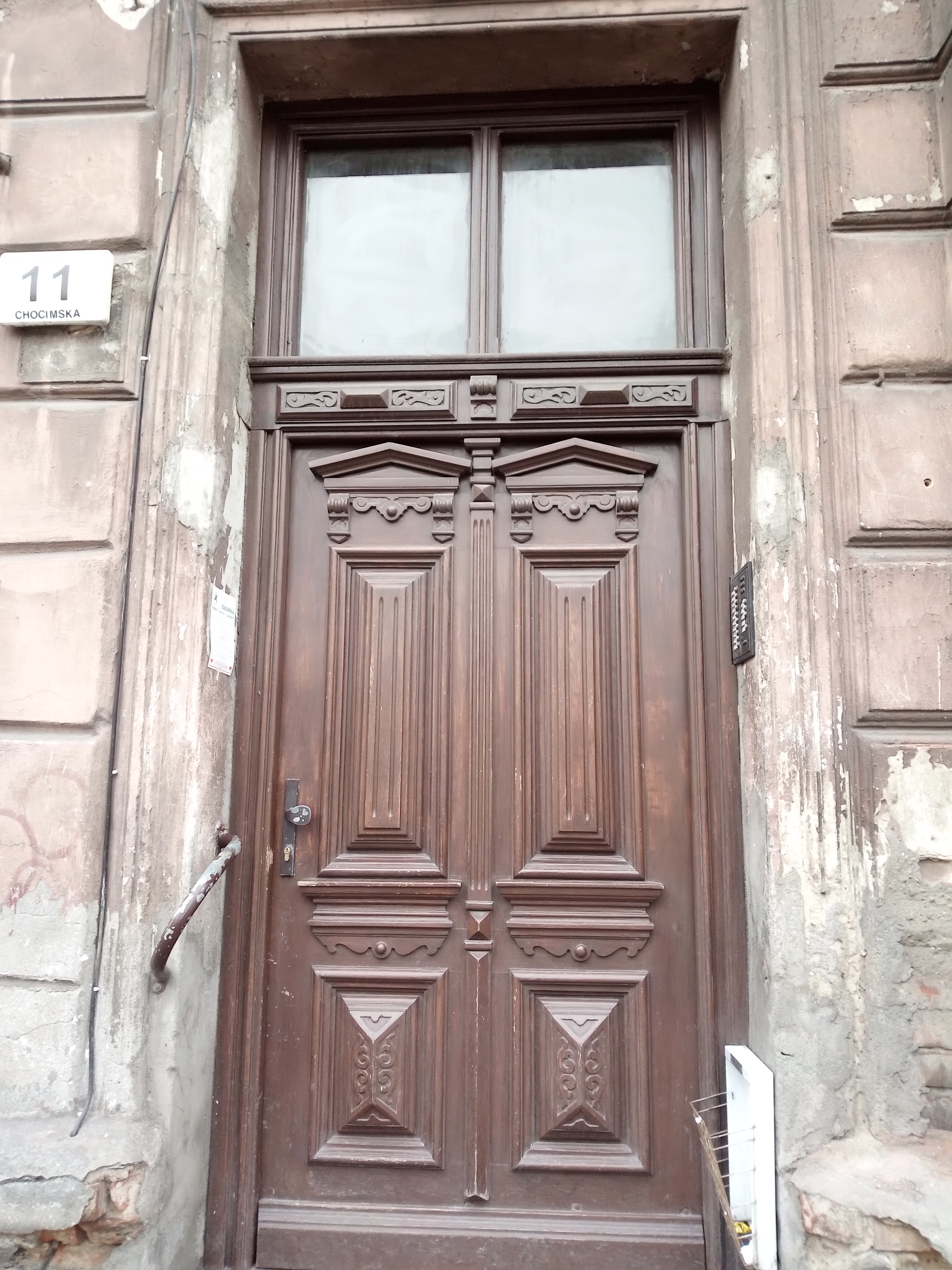
Door onto Chocimska street

=== Tenement at 16 Chocimska street, corner with Kościuszki street ===
1895

Eclecticism

The tenement was initially the property of Franz ßawlowski, a mason living at today's 26 Chocimska street, who put it for renting.

Nicely renovated in 2017, both elevations exhibit stuccoed motifs around the openings, a corbel table on the eaves as well as a delicate mascaron above the entrance on Chocimska street.

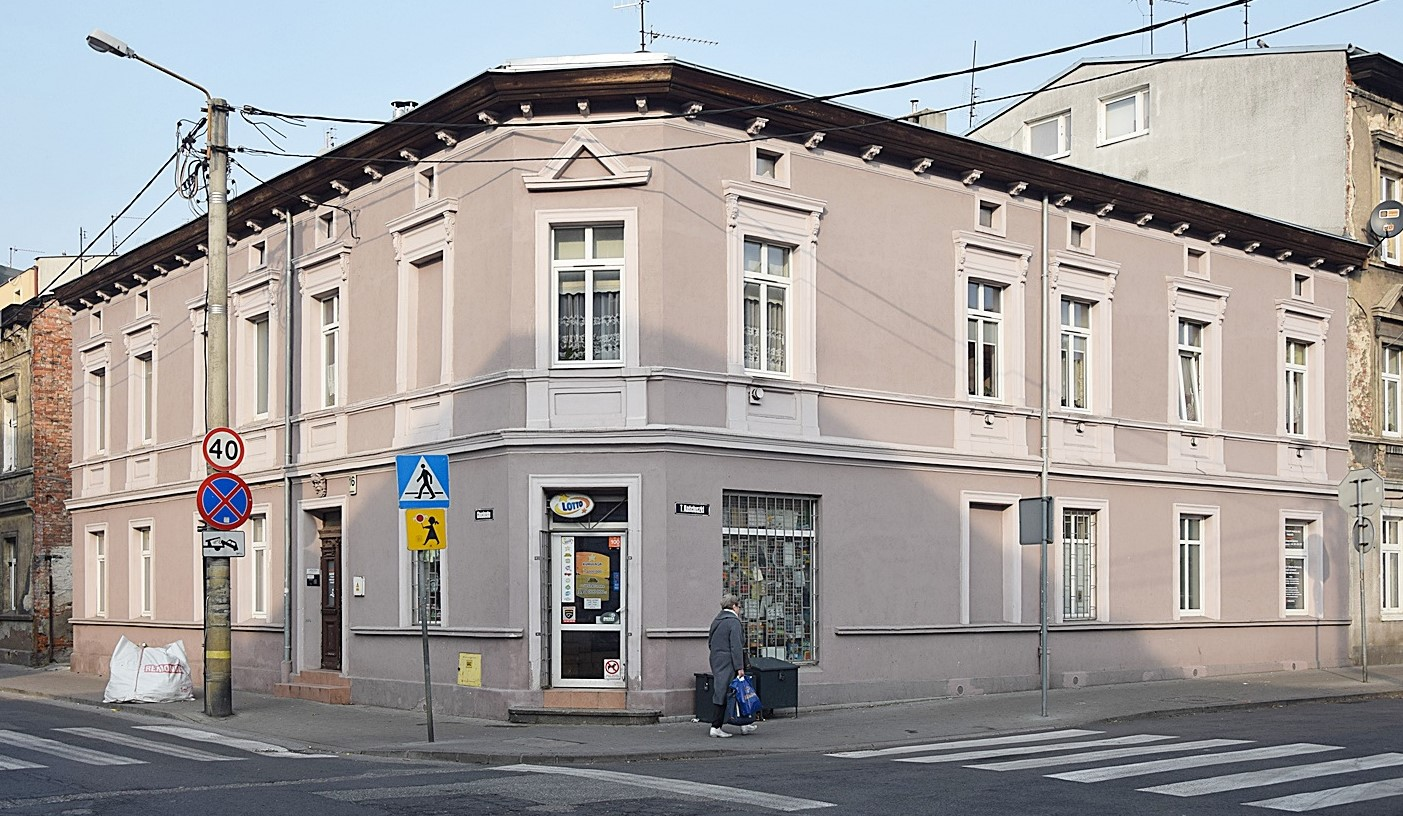
View from street crossing

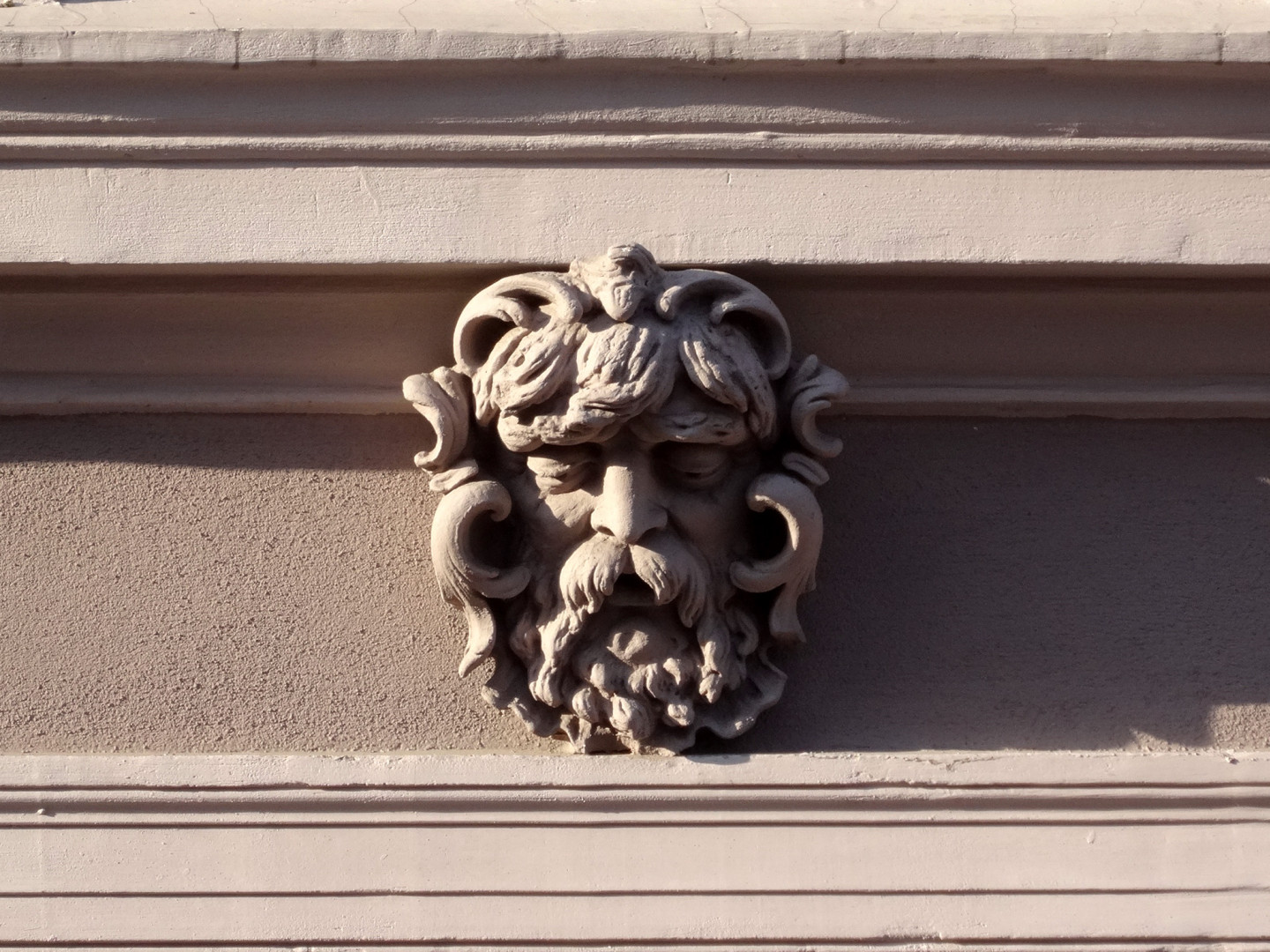
Mascaron

=== Zbylski house, at 28/30 ===
1880s

Eclecticism

Joseph Zbylski was a railway worker. The Zbylski family kept ownership of the building till the mid-1925s.

The house still keeps his front yard and its original fencing.

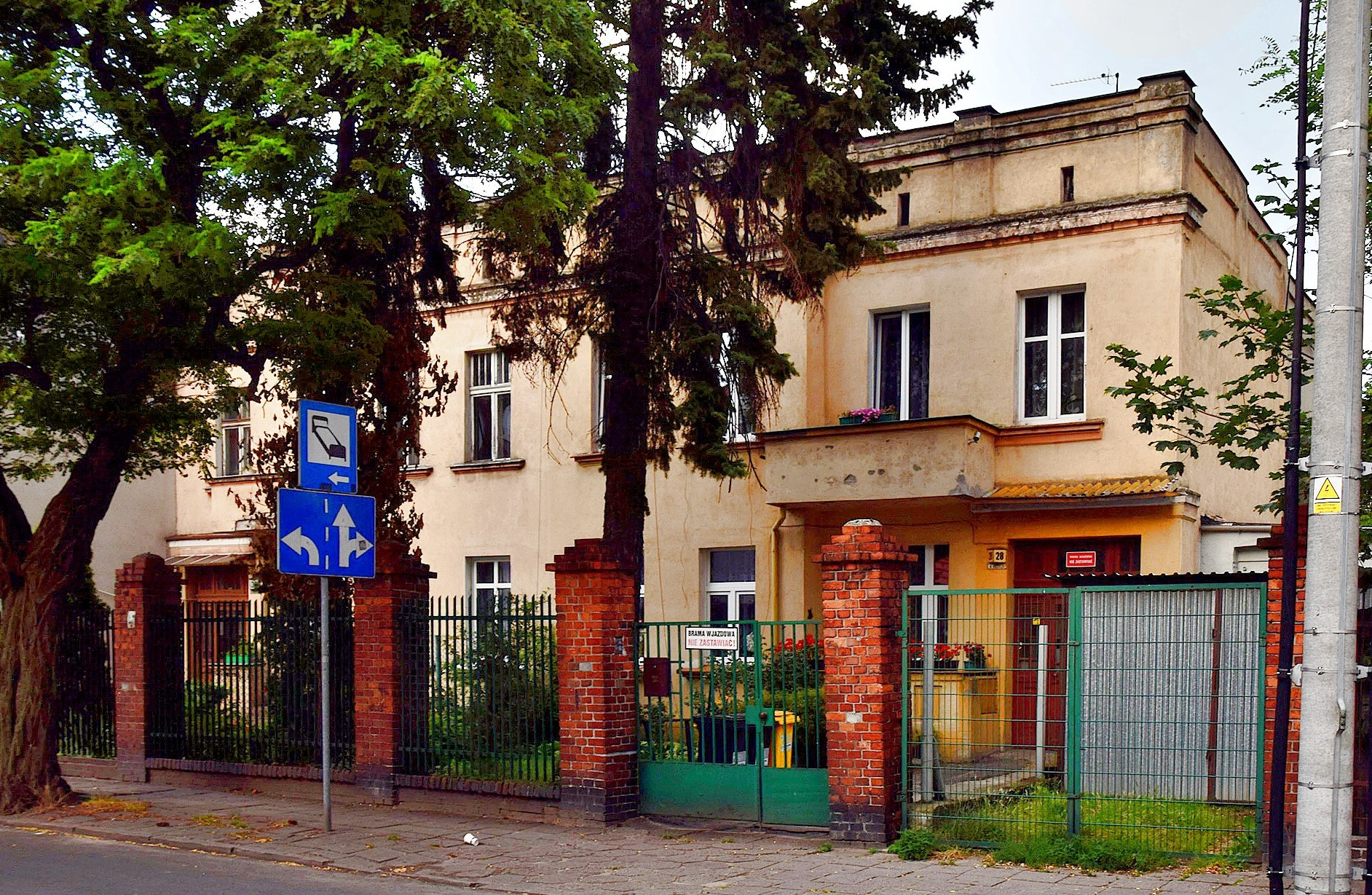
The house seen from the street

=== Tenement at 29 ===
1896

The building was commissioned by Franz Pawlowski, a mason builder, at the same time as the tenement he had built at present day 16 Chocimska street. Franz Pawlowski lived at today's 26 Chocimska street.

The tenement, in need of restoration, still holds some fragments of decoration, mainly pediments and cartouches.

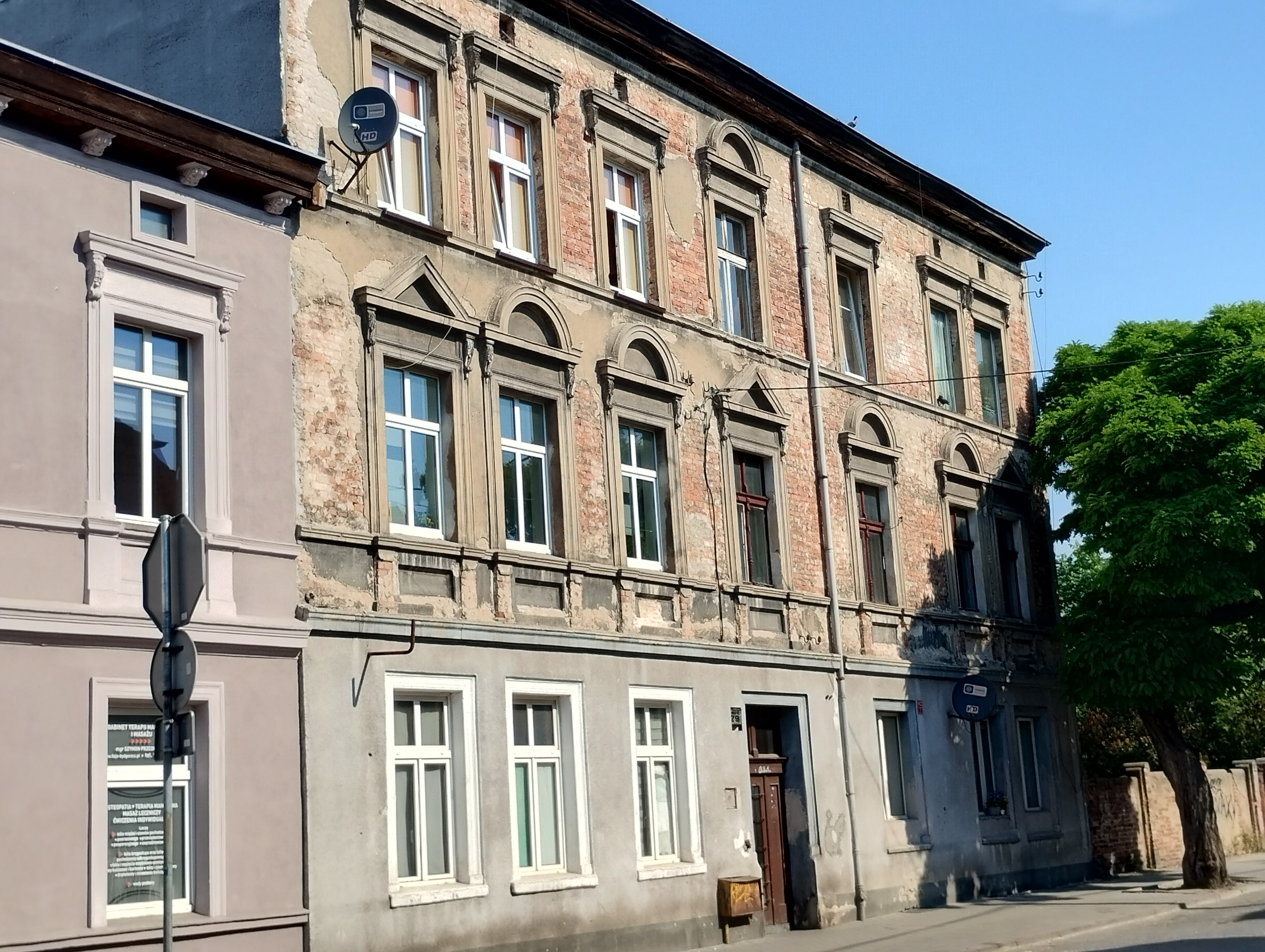
Main frontage on the street

=== House at 34 ===
1882

The house retains a nice large wooden entrance door.

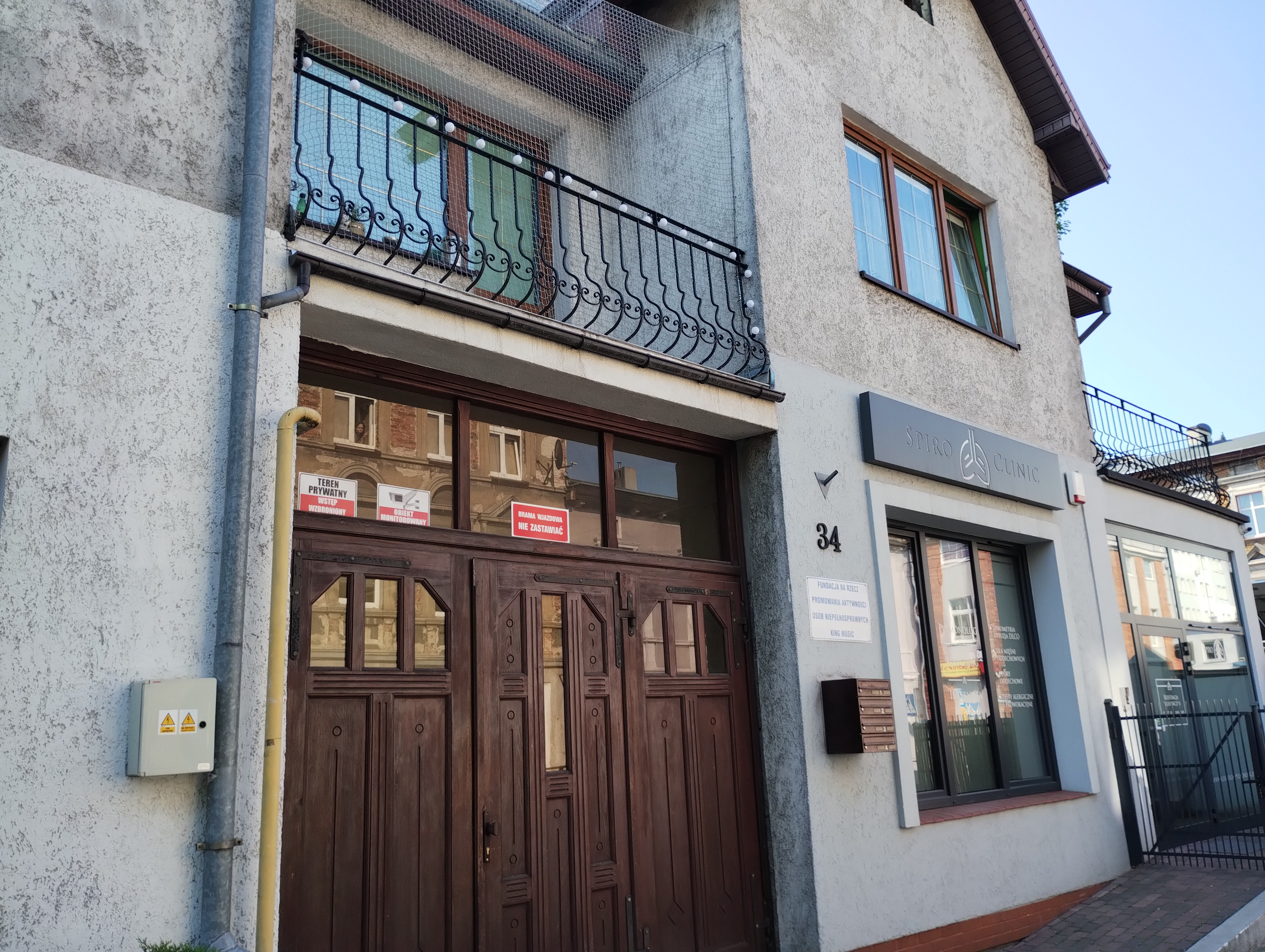
Entrance door

=== Former Middle school Nr.24, at 37a ===
The ensemble was closed down in 2017, following the Polish education system reform. Part of the building now houses a vocational school (Polish: Zasadnicza Szkoła Zawodowa Wiedza) and "Orlik", a sport complex.

In 2013, a mural portraying detective Sherlock Holmes was unveiled, in reference to the nearby "Londynek" area.

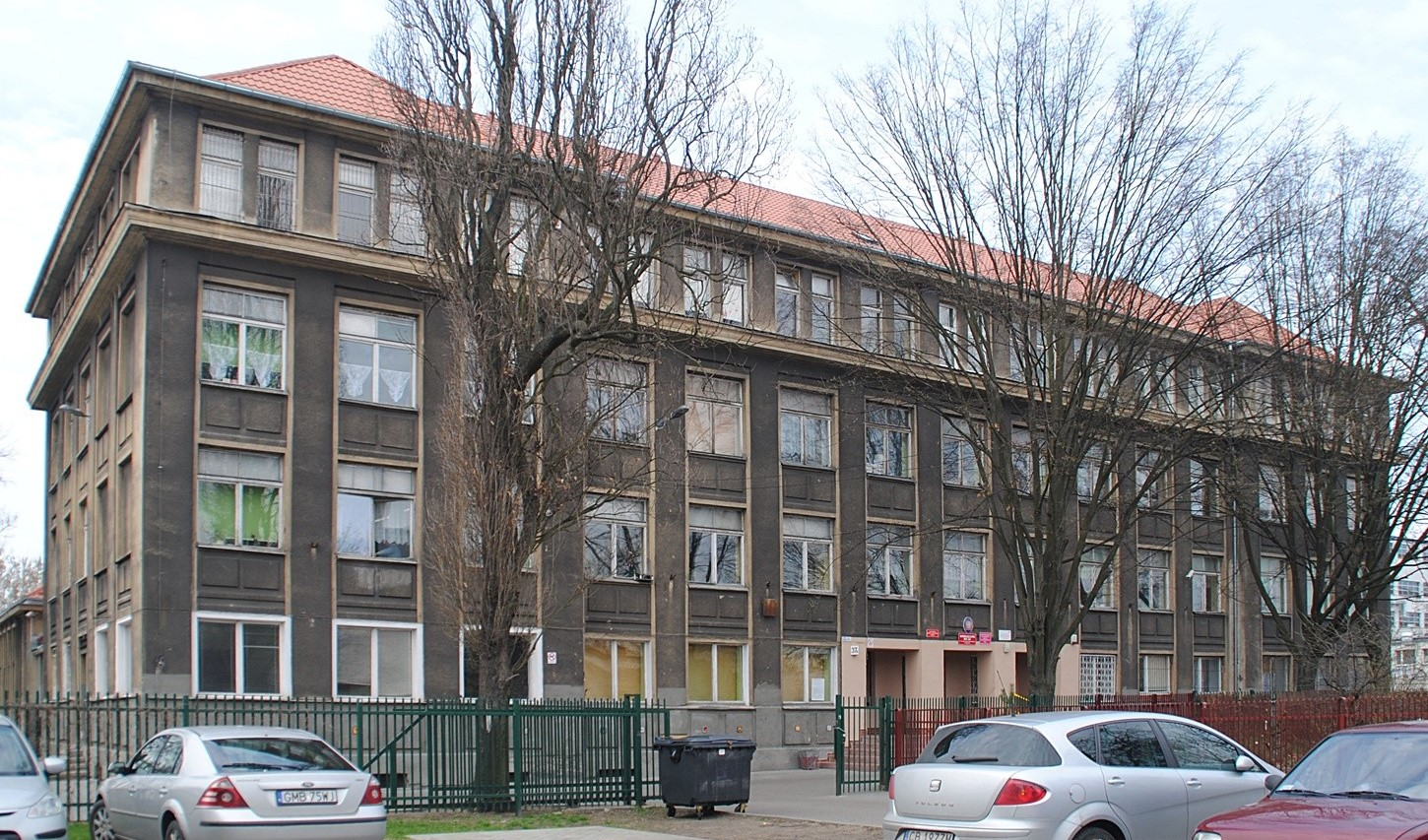
Main building

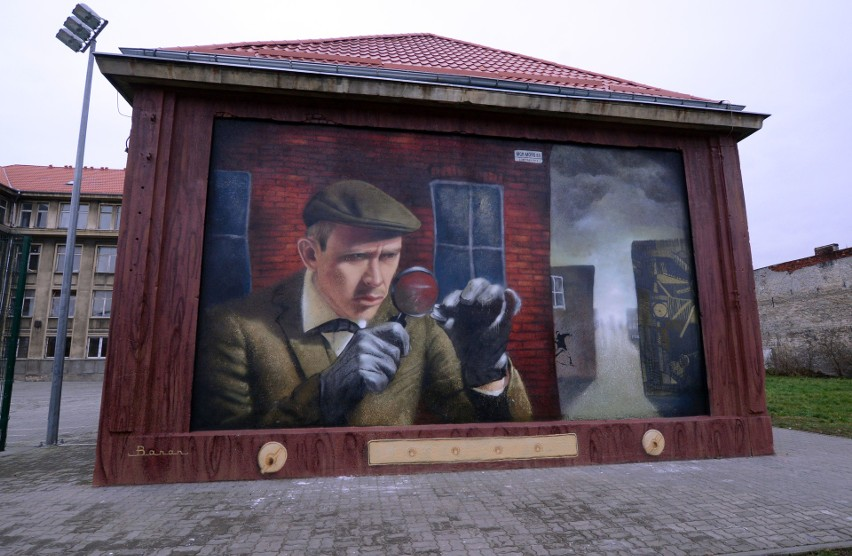
Sherlock Holmes mural

=== Tenement at 42 ===
1893

This building at then "39 Königstraße" was ordered by Wilhelm Bablitz, a master cooper. Bablitz was living at "18 Kujawierstraße" (today's Kujawska street).

The tenement is in dire state and retains very few architectural details.

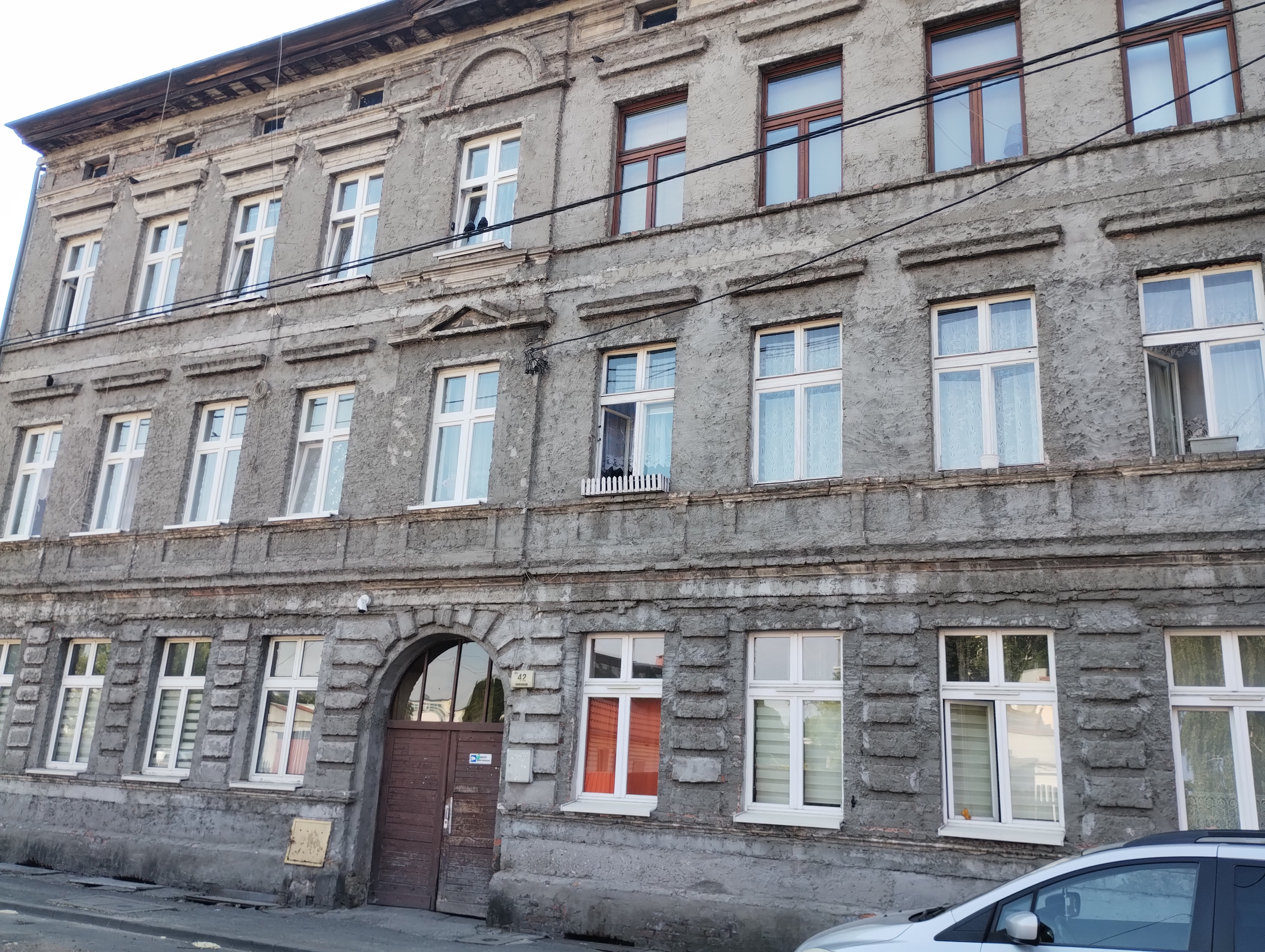
Main frontage on the street

=== Tenement at 46 ===
1891

The edifice has been renovated in the 2010s.

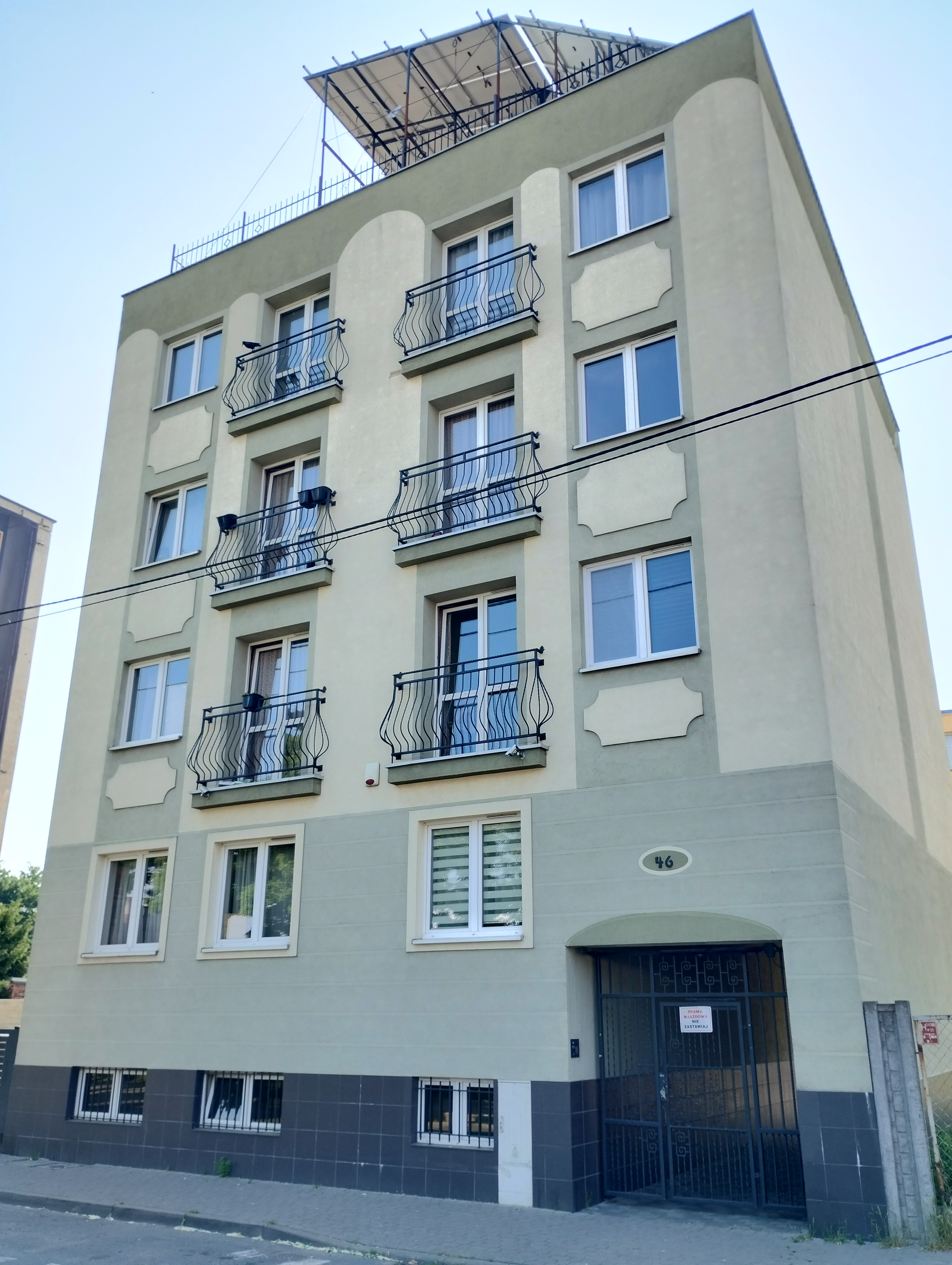
View of the building from the street

=== Tenement at 51 ===
1880s, by Anton Hoffmann

Eclecticism

One of the oldest edifices in the street, it has been designed by local architect Anton Hoffmann.

The tenement needs renovation, but still exhibits eclectic architectural details.

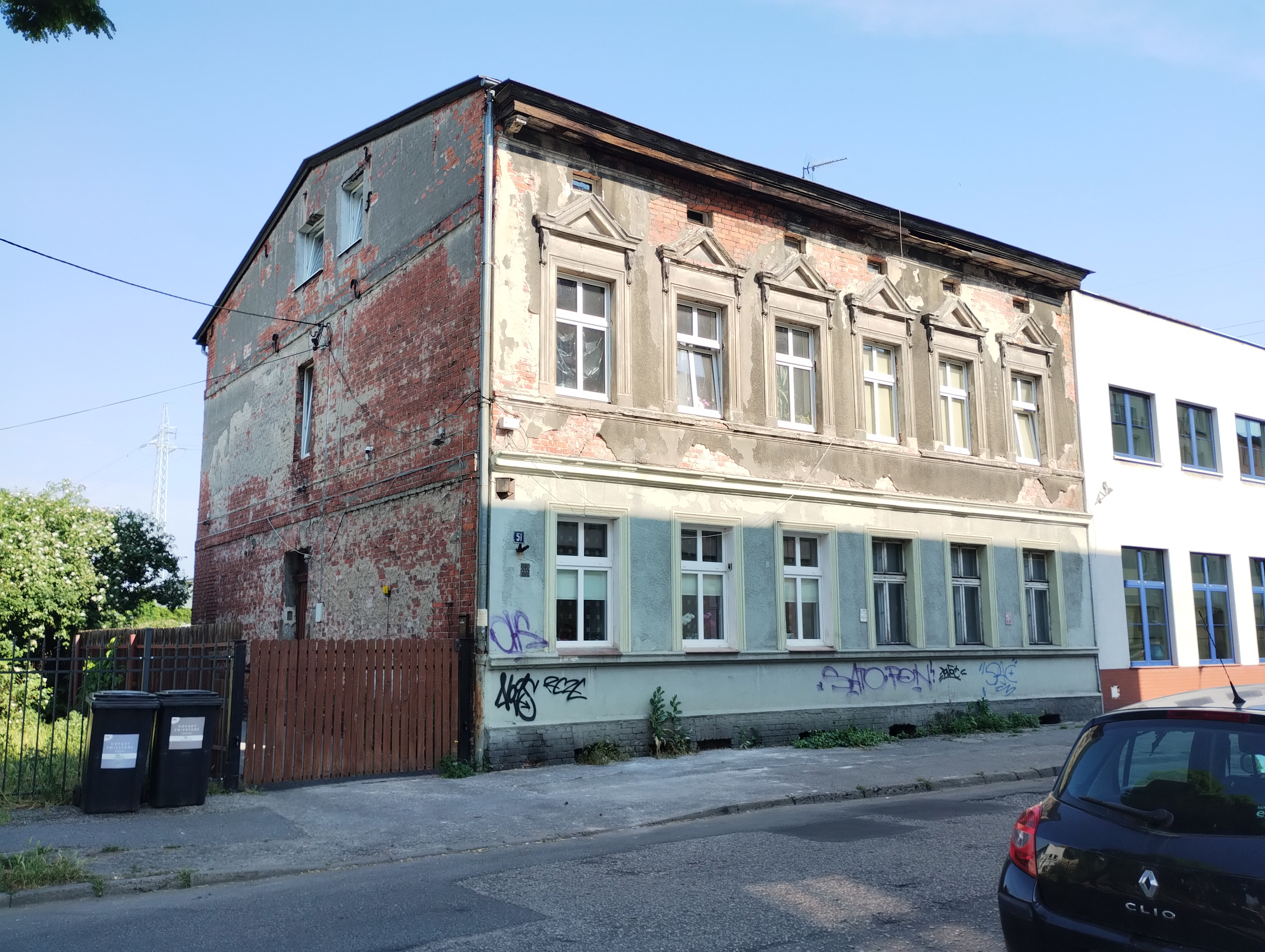
View from the street

=== Tenement at 52 ===
1895

Eclecticism

August Käding, working as a pointsman, was the first owner of the building. He was living at "72 Danzigerstraße" (present day 129 Gdańska street.

Many decorative elements has been lost, leaving the slight avant-corps, the large entrance door and some window pediments.

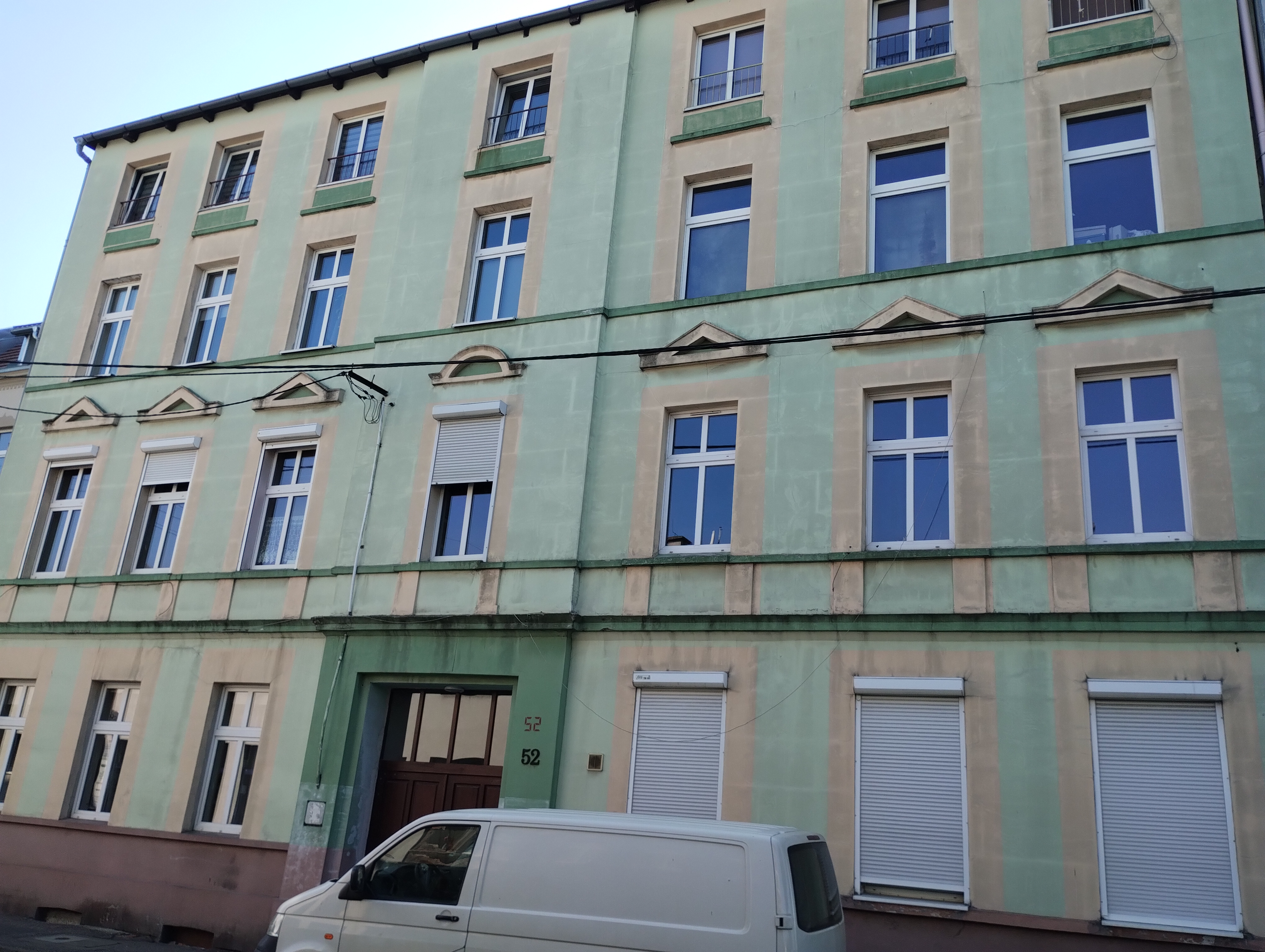
Facade on the street

=== Former Jutrzenka factory, at 53/55 ===
Jutrzenka is a food industry enterprise, set up in 1951 in Bydgoszcz from the aggregation of nationalized companies dating from the pre-war period. It has been incorporated in 2014 into the Colian Holding, seated in Opatówek in the Greater Poland Voivodeship.

Initially the site had been producing hardtacks for the army: during WWII, it was operated by "Heinis Knakebrot-Backerei G.m.b.H.". In 1950, it became the "Jutrzenka plant Nr 1". Its activity was transferred to a newer factory and now the plot is the seat of "Colian Logistic".

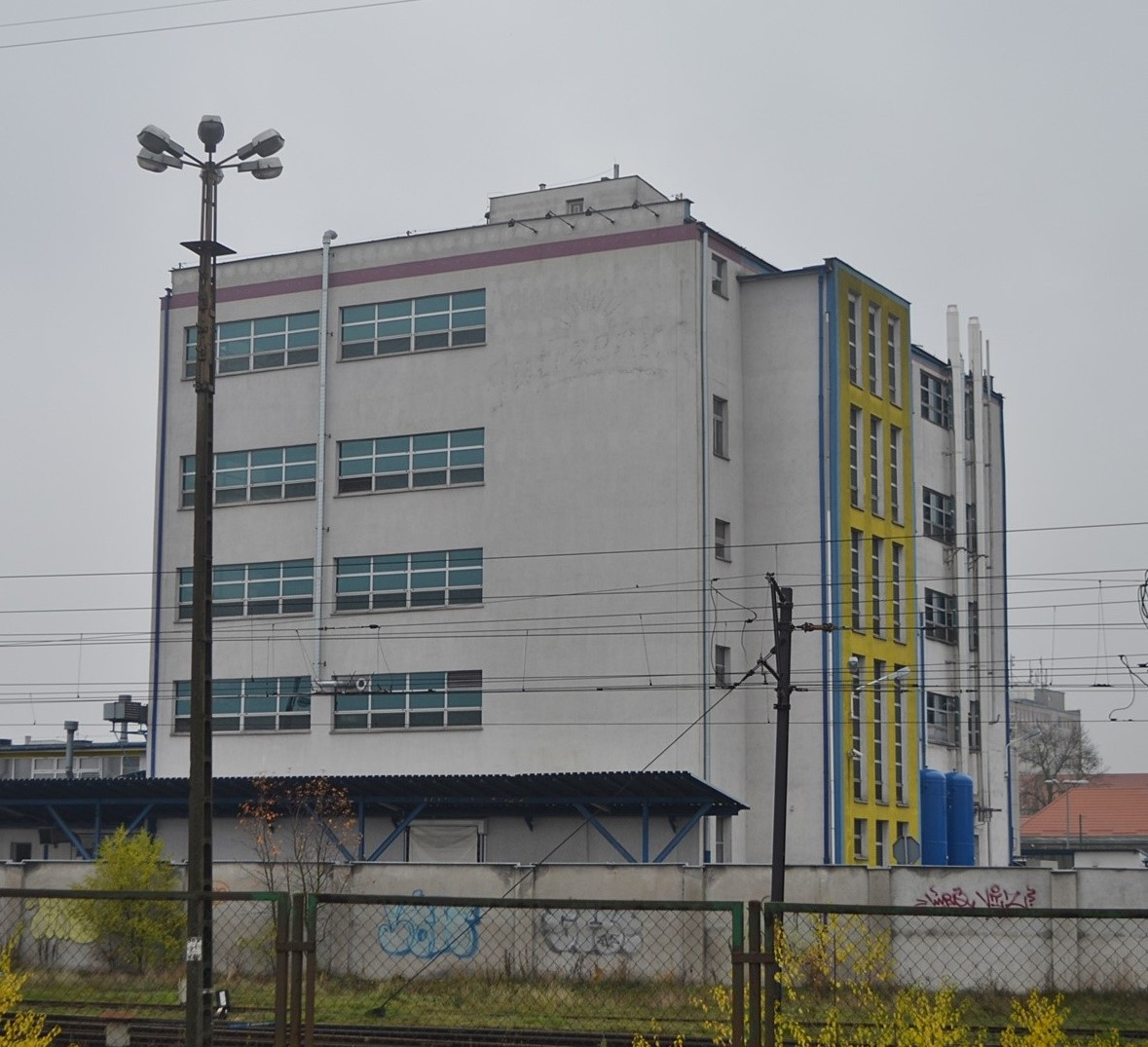
The factory in the 2000s

=== Tenement at 54 ===
1915, by Anton Czarnecki

Art Nouveau, early Modernism

The tenement, then at "34 Königstraße", was first owned by Wladisław (Wladislaus) Czarnecski, a master builder.

The building displays the same details as at its inception, in particular a remarkably Art Nouveau-adorned portal.

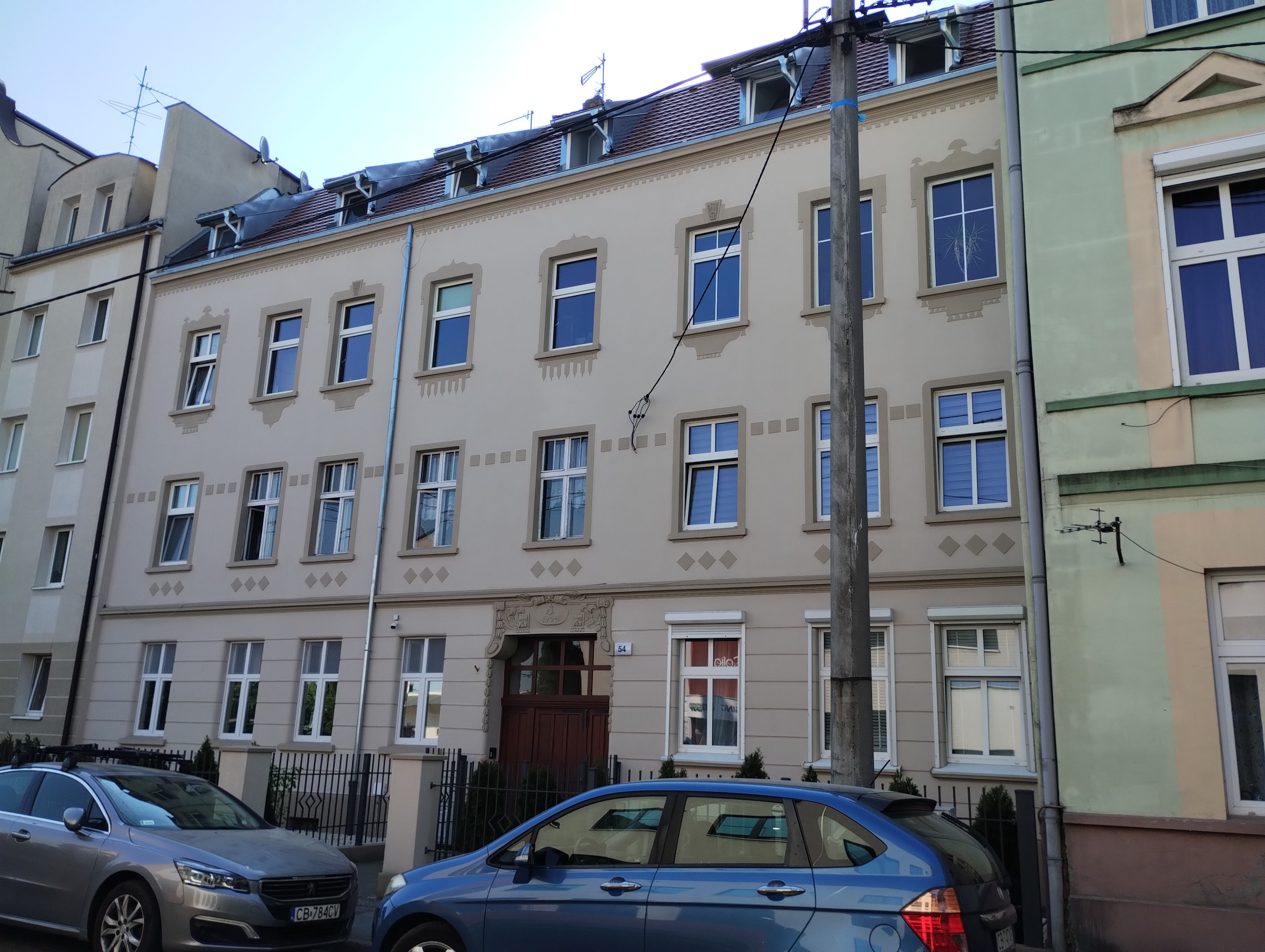
Main frontage

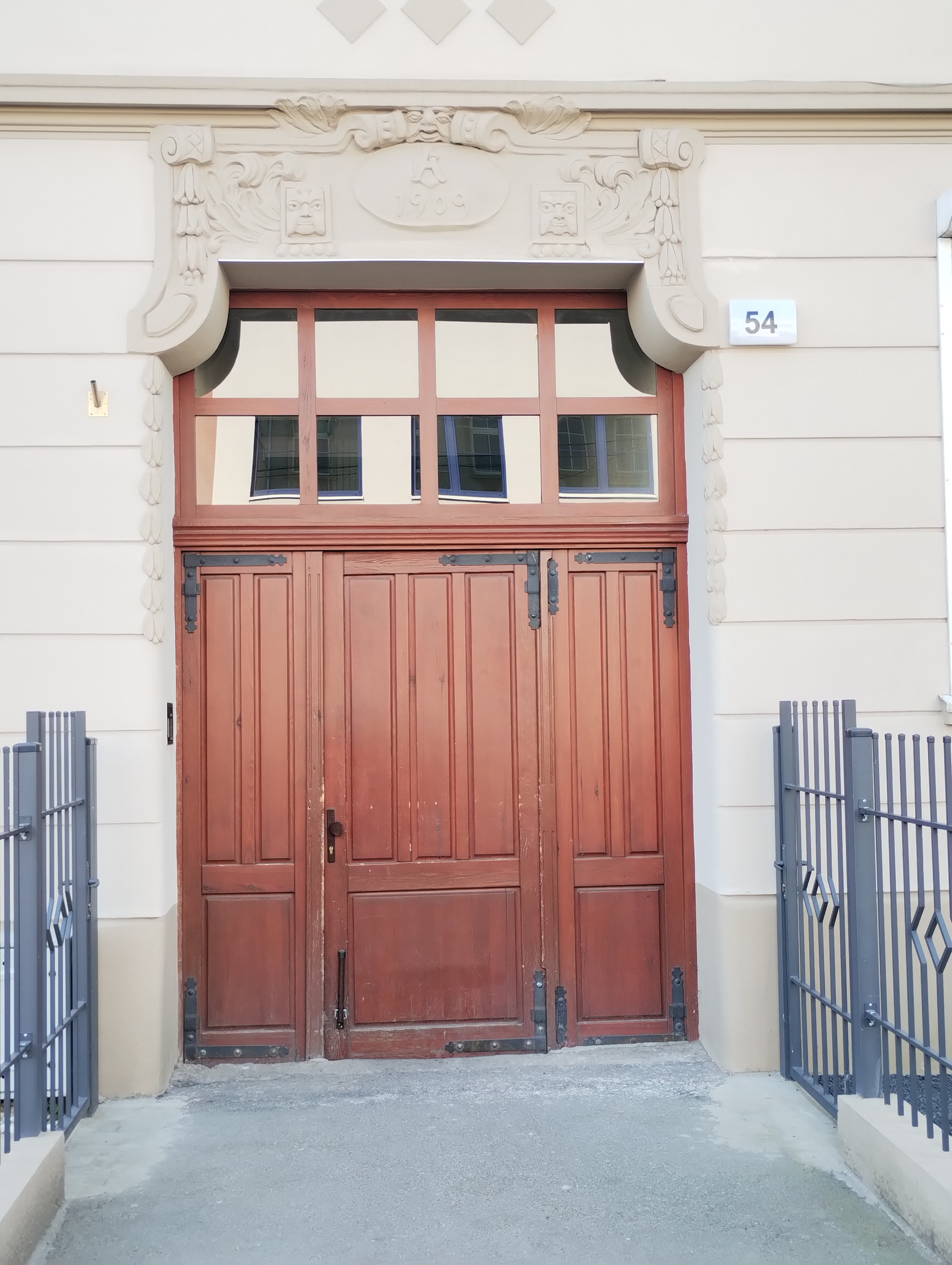
Adorned wooden door

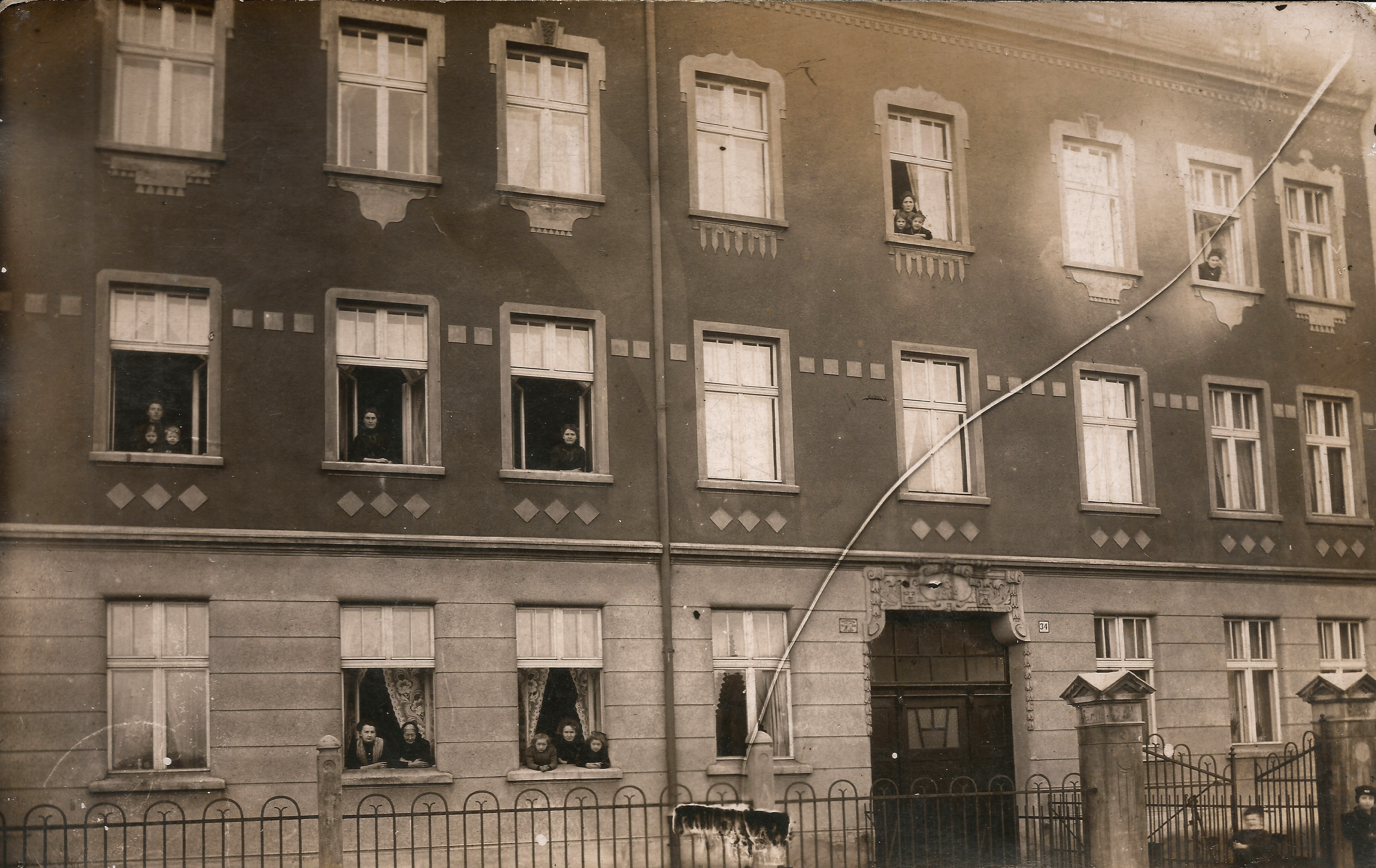
The building in the late 1910s

=== Tenement at 58 ===
1909

Early Modernism

First registered landlord was Friedrich ßansegrau, a carpenter.

Apart from the light ground floor bossage, few elements are noticeable on the facade.

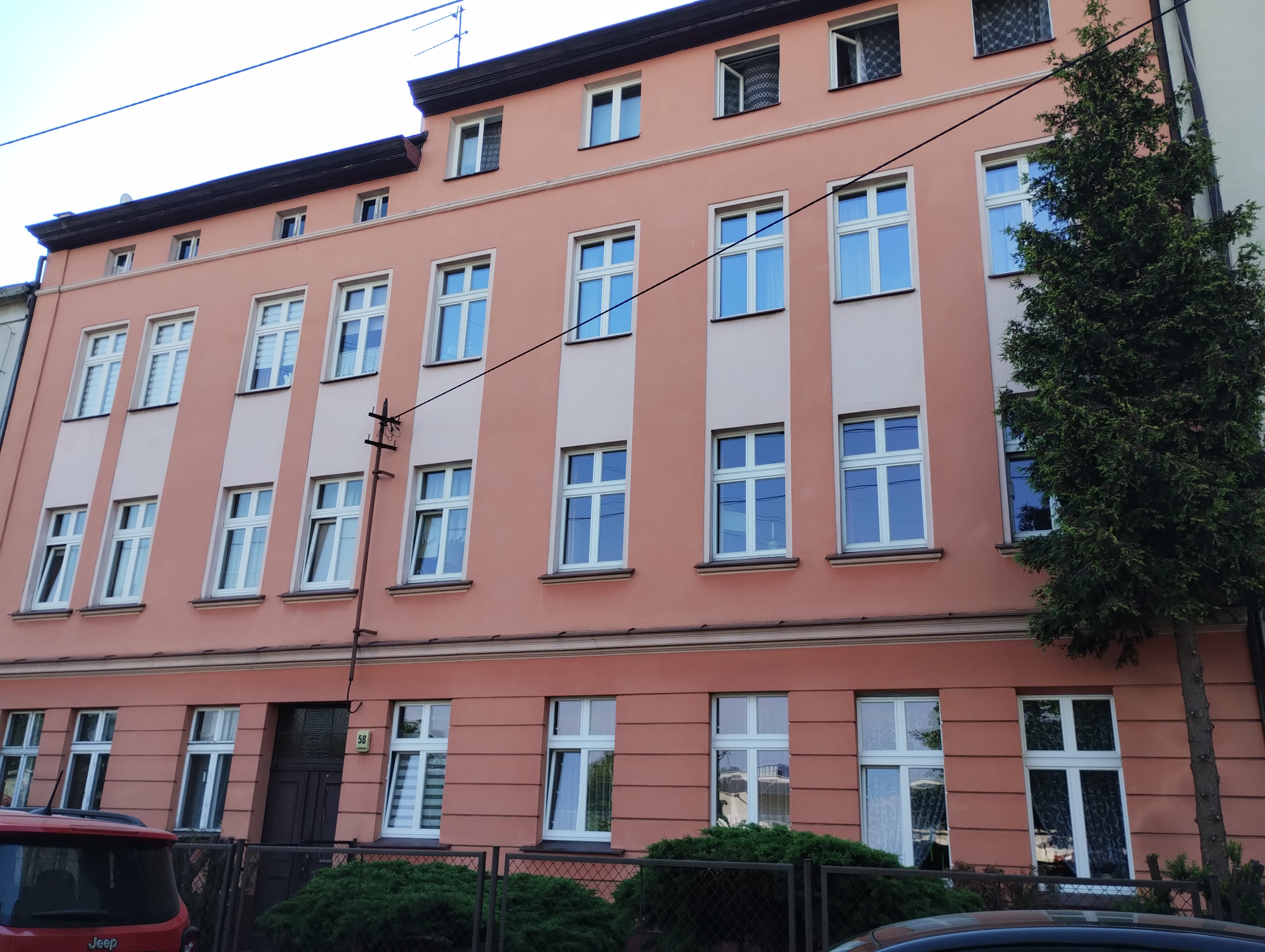
Main frontage on the street

=== Former oil factory at 60 ===
Ernst Schmidt Oil refinery, fat factory and resin oil distillation (German: Ölraffinerie, Fettfabrik und Harzöldestillation von Ernst Schmidt) was located on the plot between Kościuszki street, Gdańska street and the railway tracks.

In 1890, Ernst Schmidt, living at 14 Dworcowa Street, launched a drive belt factory. In 1904, he expanded its activity to the production of chemical and technical preparations. For this purpose, Schmidt built at then "29/31 Königstraße" a factory complex with a 900 square metres (0.22 acres) hall equipped with a steam drive.

The oil factory was established in 1904, the resin distillation plant two years later. The raw materials and oil distillates were imported (America, Russia, Bohemia). Best seller products were carbolineum and automotive lubricants.

The firm was disbanded after the end of the First World War: the vast plot was constructed with tenements onto Kościuszki and Gdańska street. The buildings on Kościuszki street are today in a derelict state.

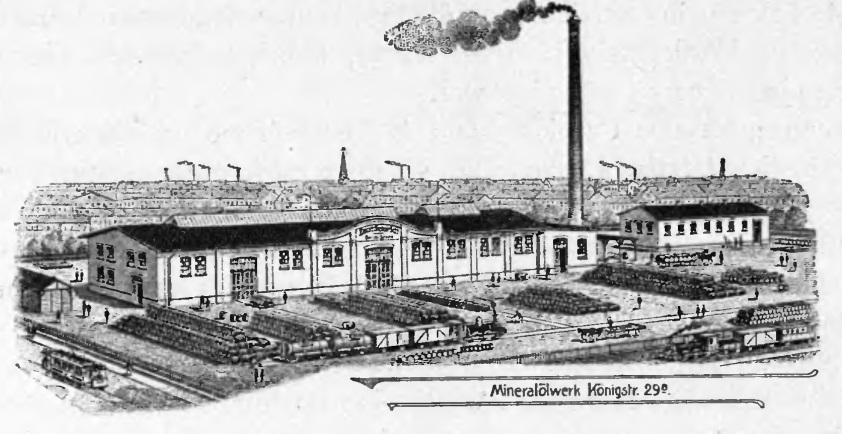
Picture of the plant ca 1906

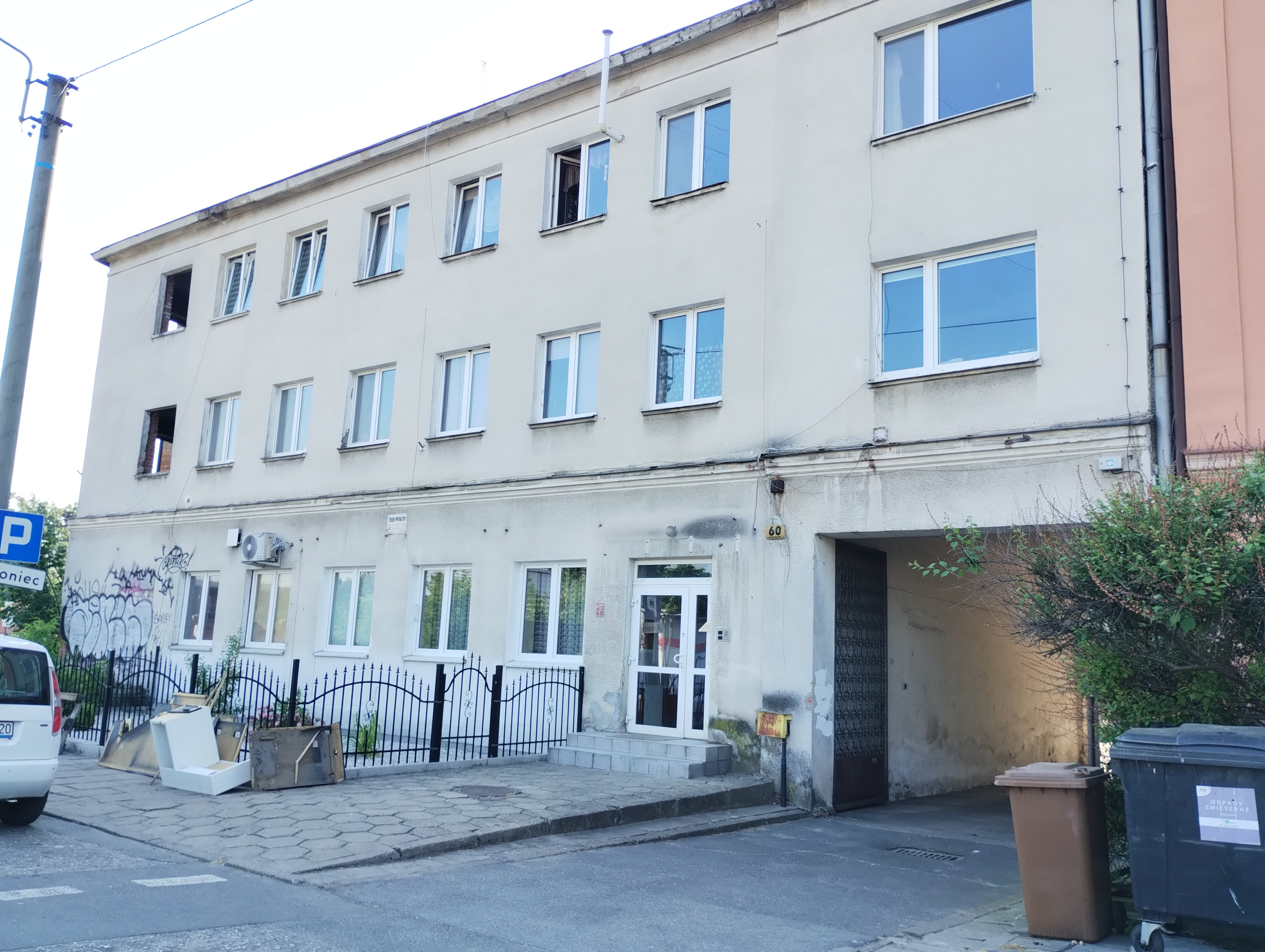
Partly Partly abandoned tenement at 60

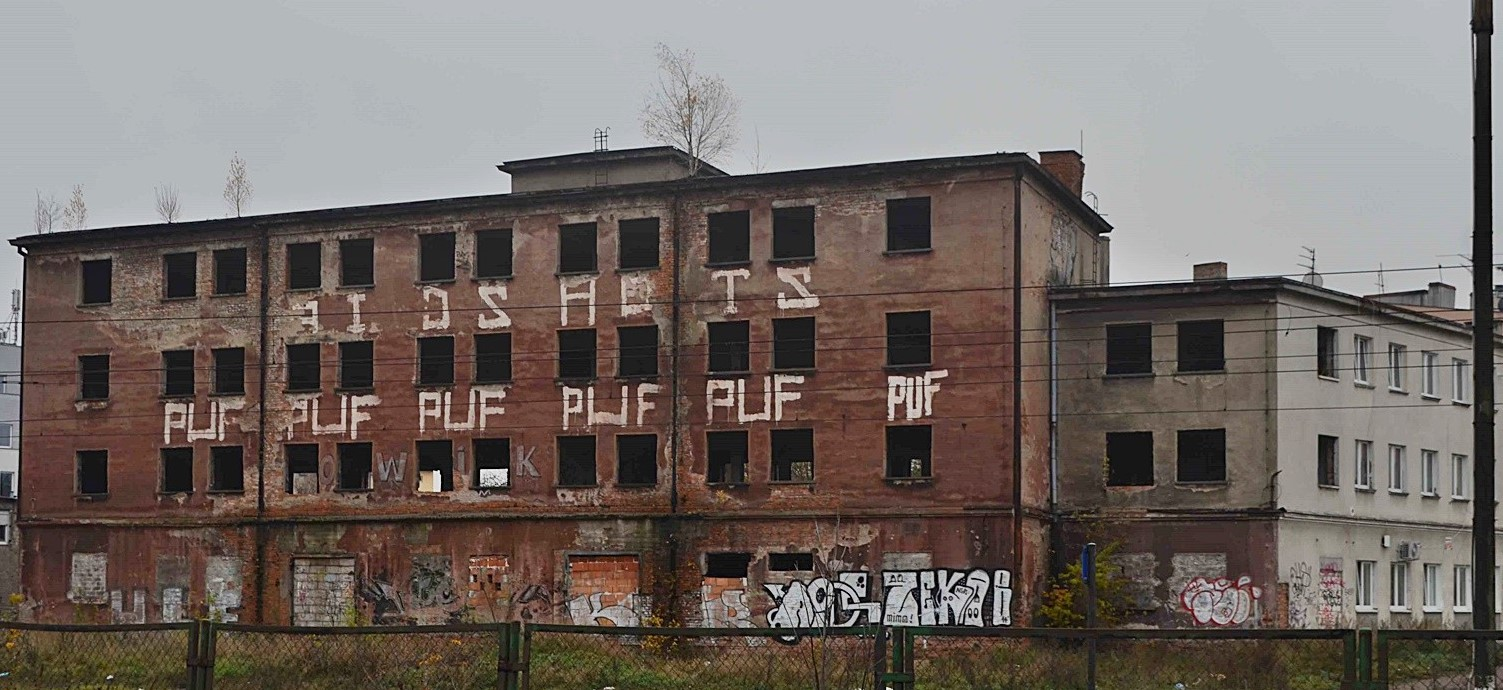
Derelict building facing the railway tracks

== See also ==
- Bydgoszcz
- Chocimska Street, Bydgoszcz
- Świętojańska Street, Bydgoszcz
- Jutrzenka (company)
- Antoni Weynerowski
- 2017 education reform in Poland

== Bibliography ==
- Umiński, Janusz (1996). Bydgoszcz. Przewodnik [Bydgoszcz. Guide] (in Polish). Bydgoszcz: Regionalny Oddział PTTK "Szlak Brdy".
