= Świętojańska Street, Bydgoszcz =

Street, Bydgoszcz, Poland, 19th-20th century

Coordinates: 53°07′58″N 18°00′29″E

Świętojańska Street in Bydgoszcz
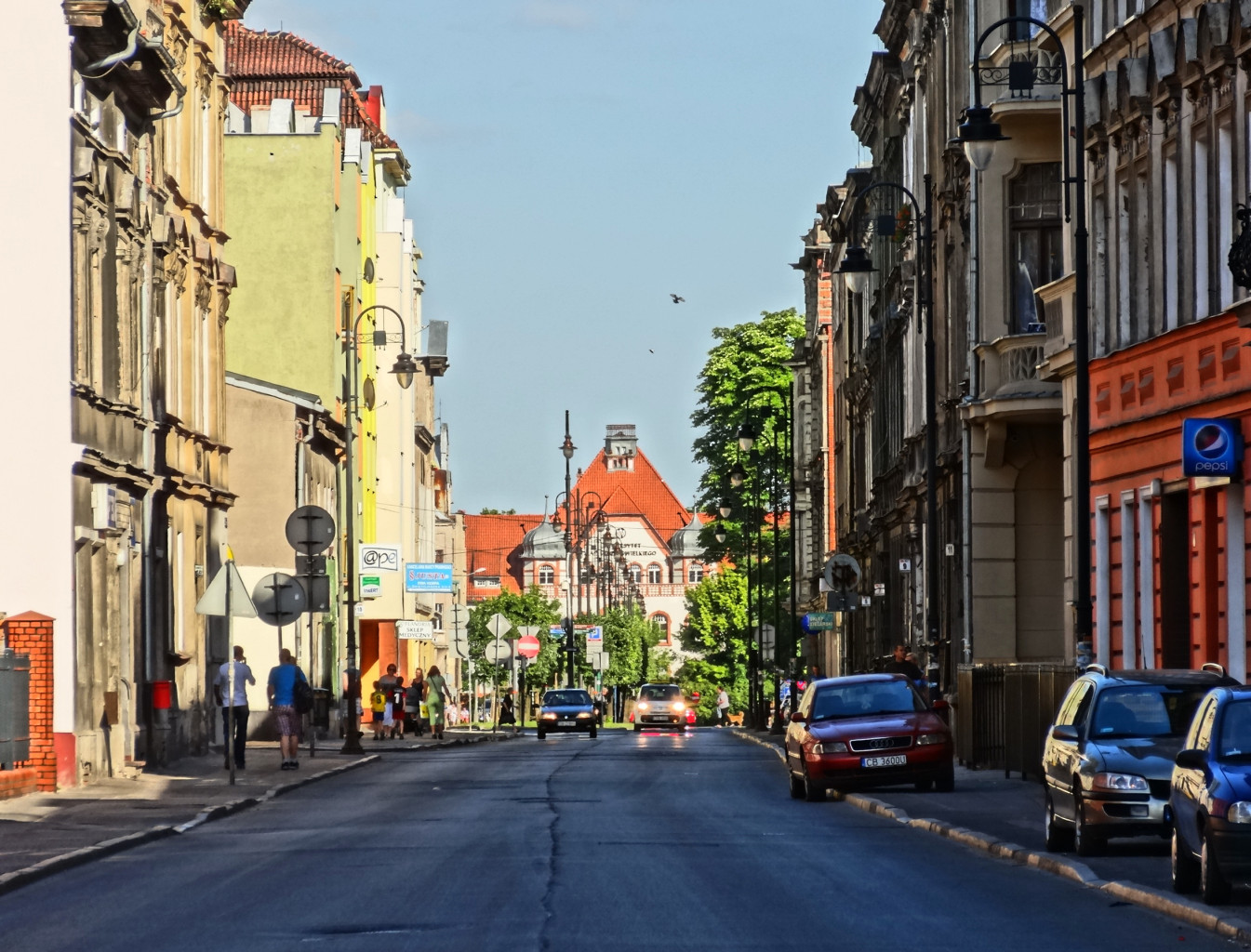
- Eastward view

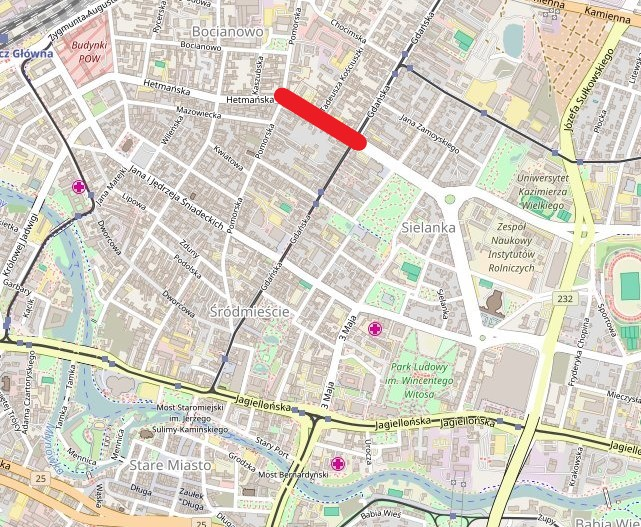
- Świętojańska street highlighted on a map
- Native name: Ulica Świętojańska w Bydgoszczy (Polish)
- Former name: Johannis Straße
- Part of: Bocianowo/Śródmieście districts
- Owner: City of Bydgoszcz
- Length: 290 m (950 ft)
- Width: ca. 10m
- Location: Bydgoszcz, Poland

Construction
- Construction start: Late 1870s

Świętojańska Street is an historical avenue in downtown Bydgoszcz. Its frontages display various architectural features. A couple of them are listed on the Kuyavian-Pomeranian Voivodeship heritage list.

== Location ==
The street is laid on a south-east to north-west axis. It starts at Gdańska Street in the east, extending the Adam Mickiewicz Avenue and ends at the crossing with Pomorska Street in the west. At mid-length its path intersects Kościuszki street.

== History ==
Like many of the streets in the area, Świętojańska was laid in the late 1870s, boosted by the development of the city in the second half of the 19th century, thanks to the rising of the industrial and railway activities.

Even though the axis appears on a map of 1876, it did not bear any name at the time. In the first reference of the street in a 1878 address book, only five plots are listed. Most of the tenements were erected before the start of the 20th century.

During its existence, the street did not dramatically change naming, as both Prussian-German and Polish authorities kept the designation Jan-Johan in the calling.

Hence one can track the following names:

- from 1878 to 1920, Johannis Straße;
- from 1920 to 1939, Ulica Świętojańska;
- 1939–1945, Johannis Straße;
- Since 1945, Ulica Świętojańska.

Current (and previous) naming refers to Saint John or "Święty Jan (Ewangelista)" in Polish.

== Main areas and edifices ==
Tenement at 83 Gdańska Street, corner with Świętojańska street

Registered on Kuyavian-Pomeranian Voivodeship heritage list, Nr.601311-Reg.A/1056, February 26, 1997.

1890, by Józef Święcicki

Eclecticism

The building at then Danzigerstraße 48 had Otto Riedel, a baker, as first landlord, until World War I.

Typical from Józef Święcicki, the style of both elevations boasts eclecticism, close to Neo-baroque in the richness of the details, among others: cartouches, wrought iron balconies, bossage, bay window capped with an ogee roof and round top corbel table openings.

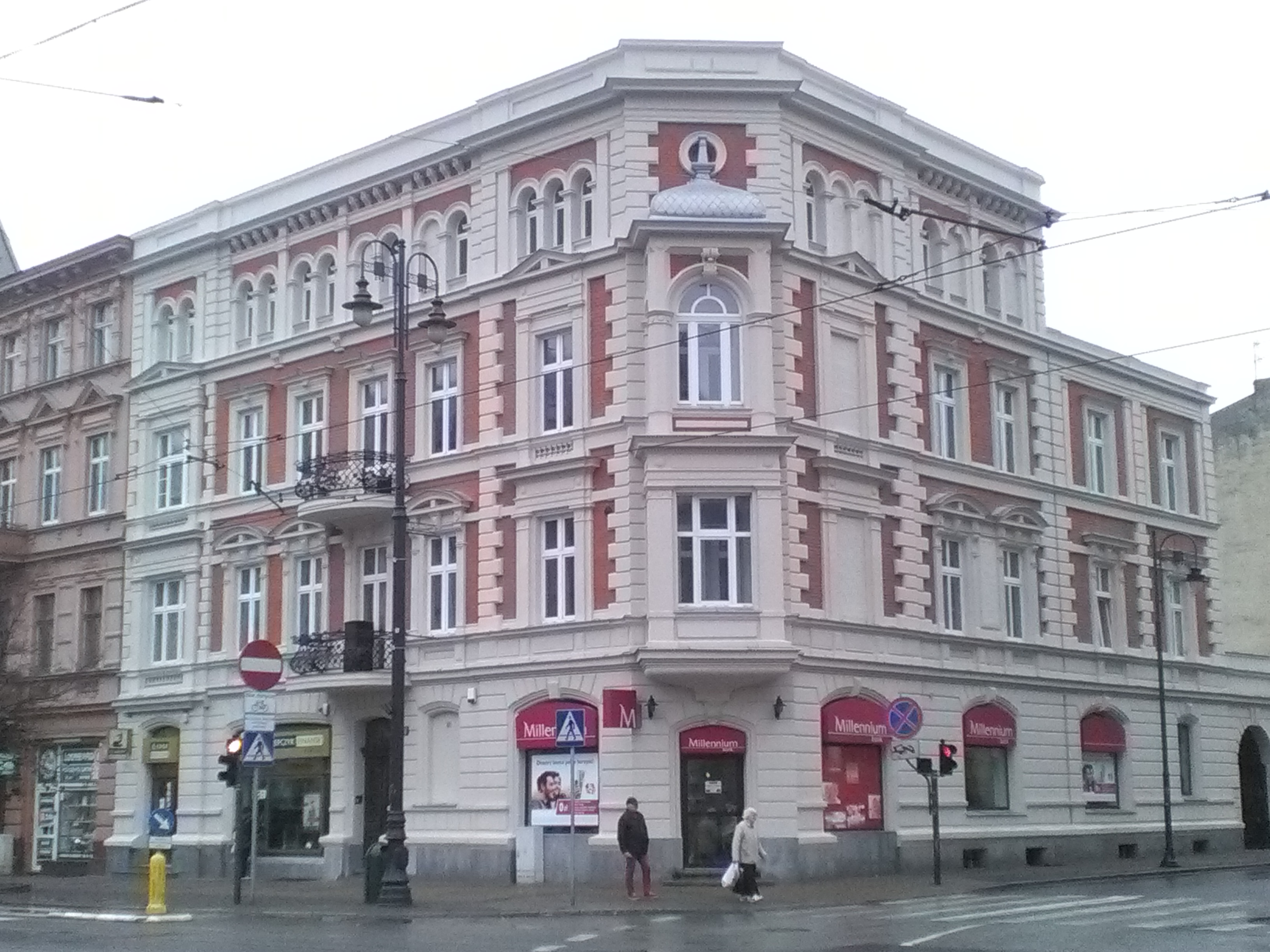
Main frontage

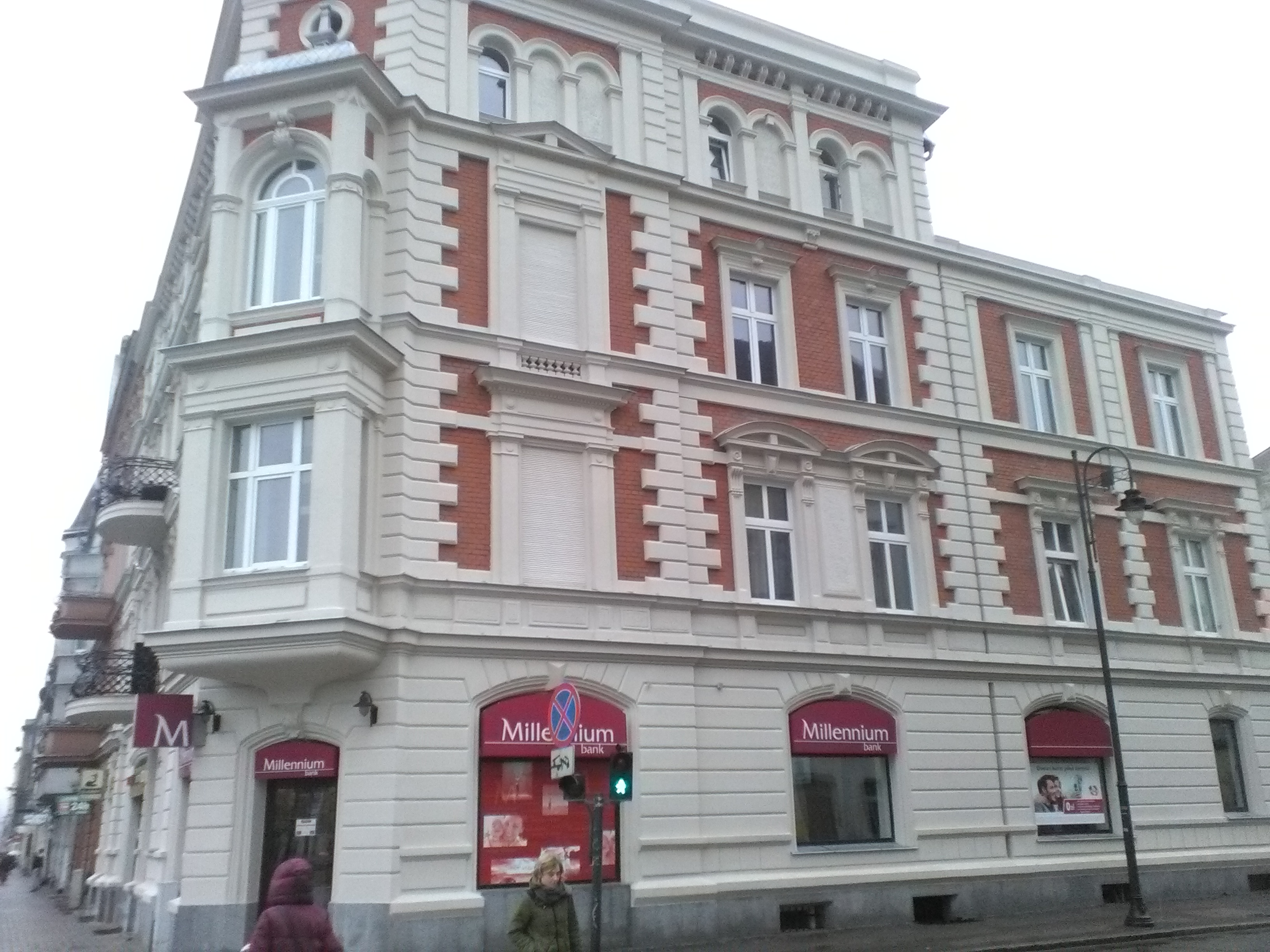
Facade on Świętojańska Street

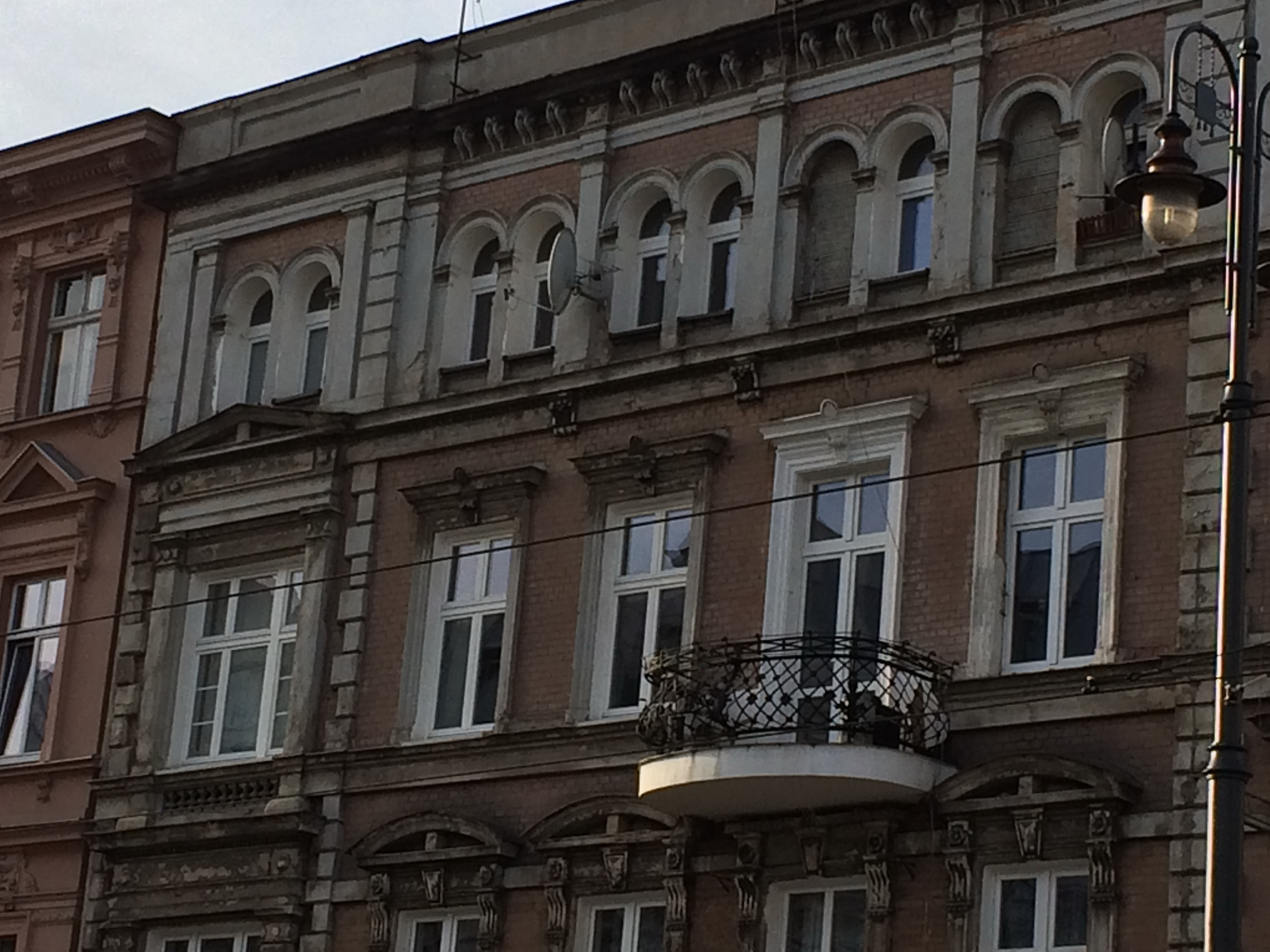
Detail of a balcony

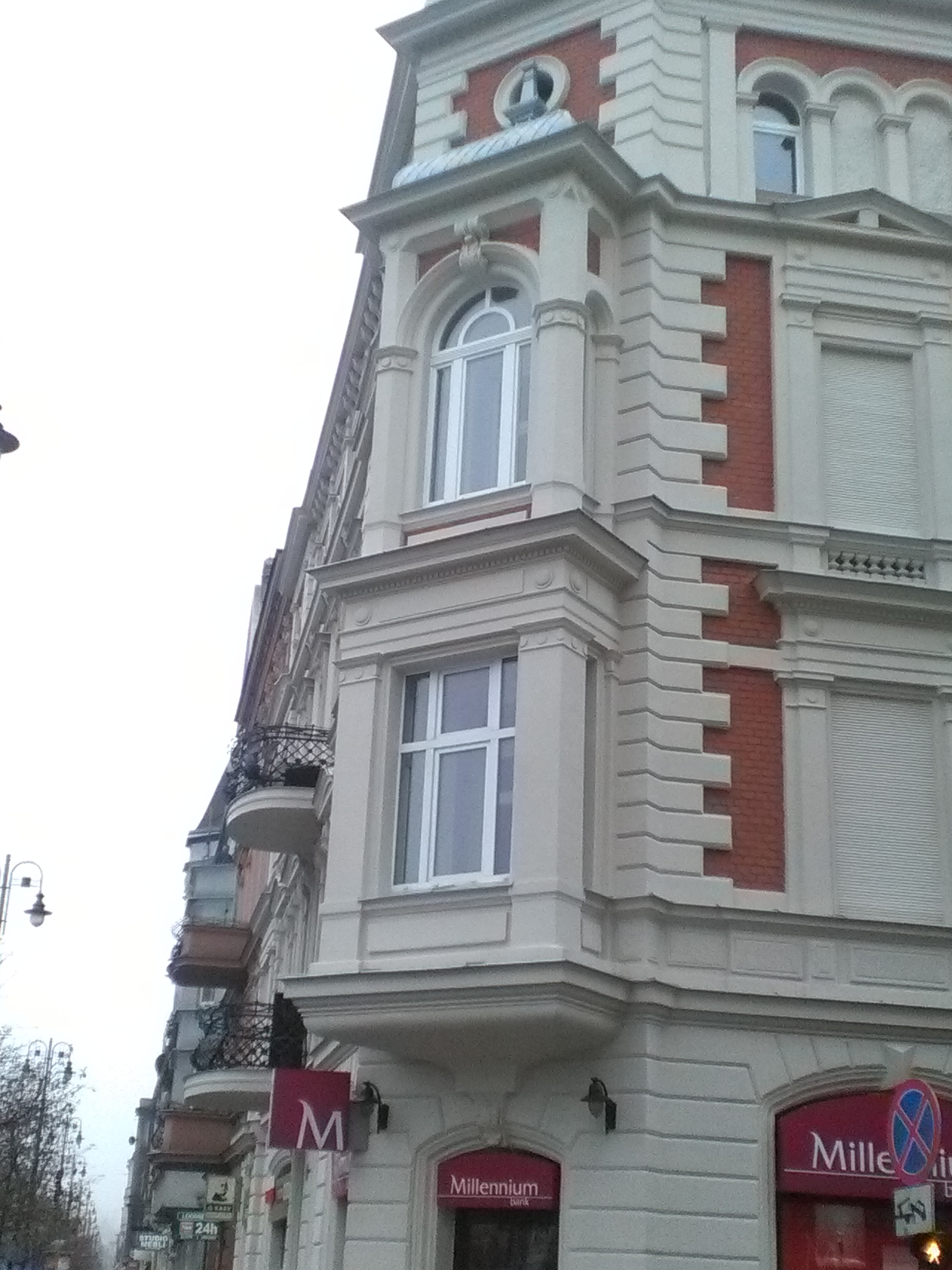
Detail of the bay window

Otto Riedl Tenement at 2, corner with Gdańska Street

1911–1912, by Paul Sellner

Modern architecture

In the 1930s, Vincent Bigoński has established here a bakery that operated till 2020.

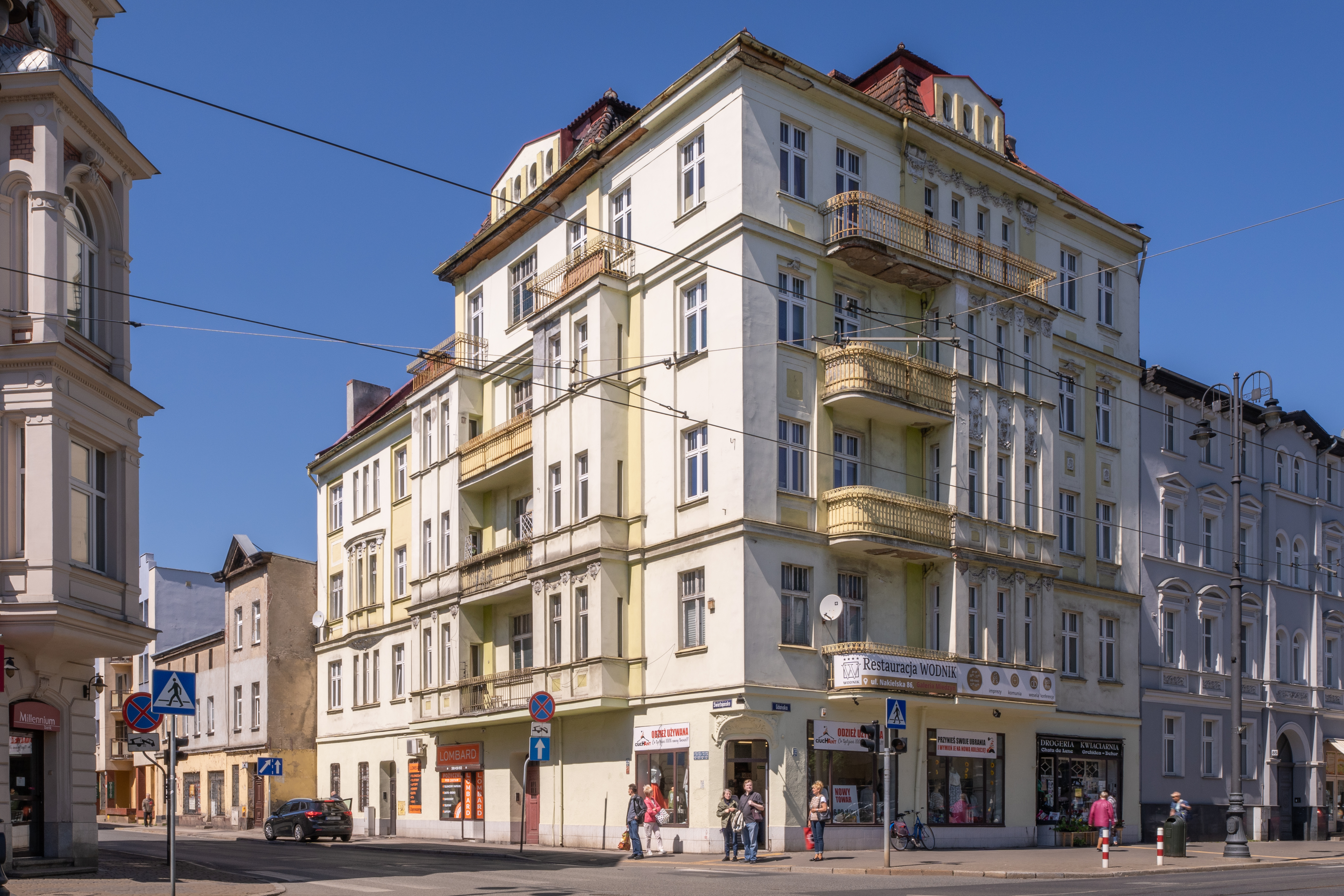
Frontages of Otto Riedl Tenement

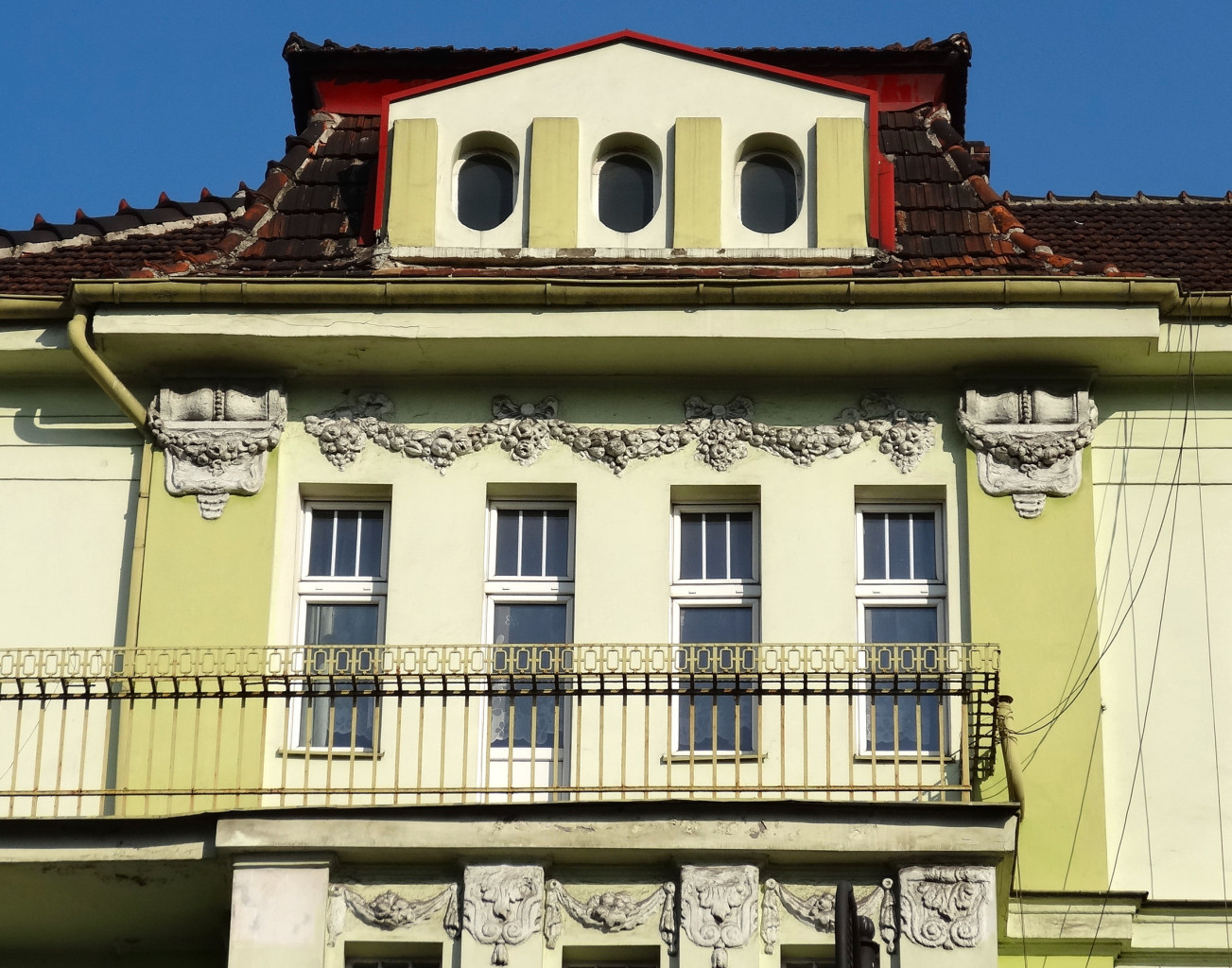
Detail of gable and balcony

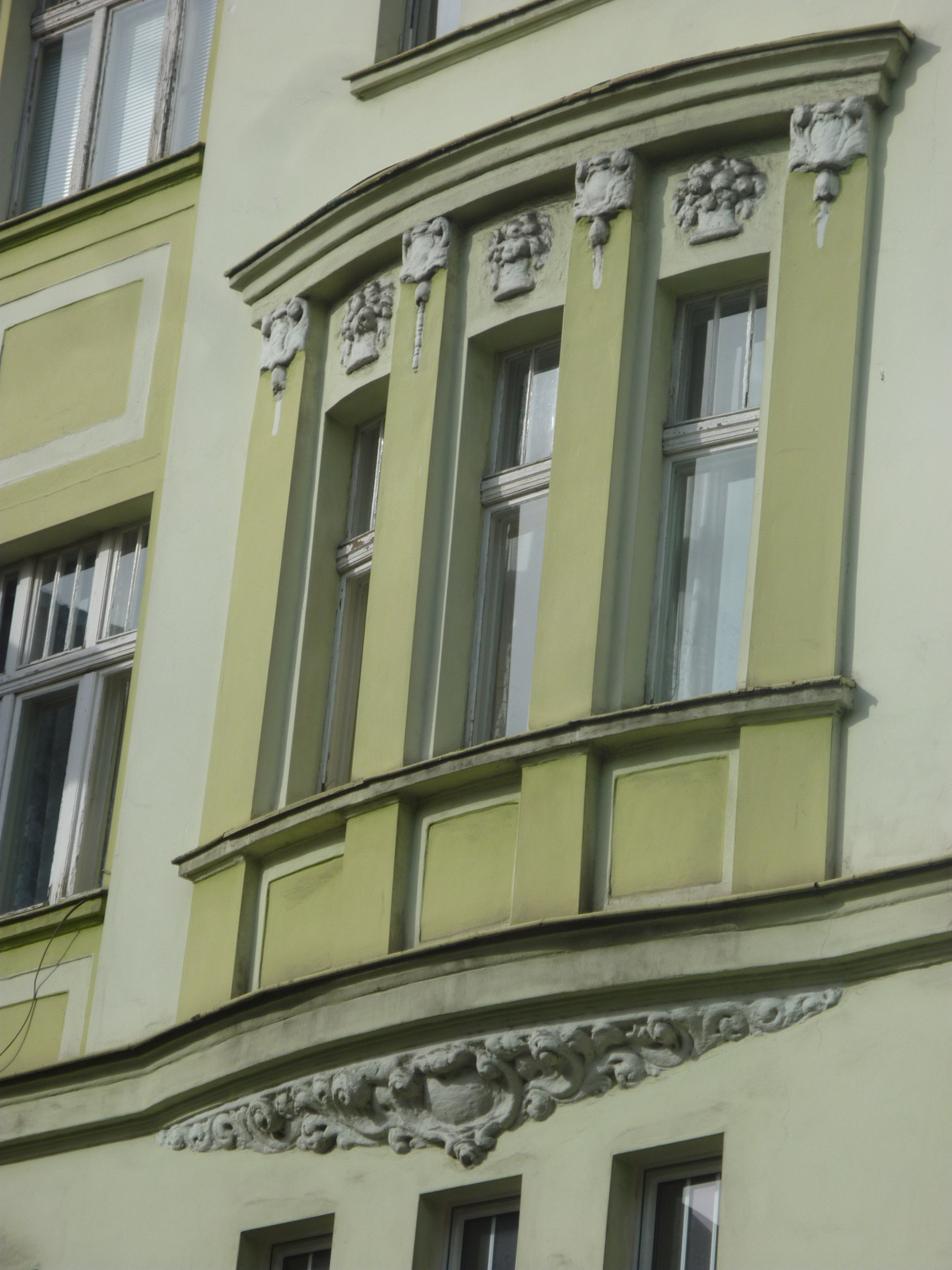
motifs detail

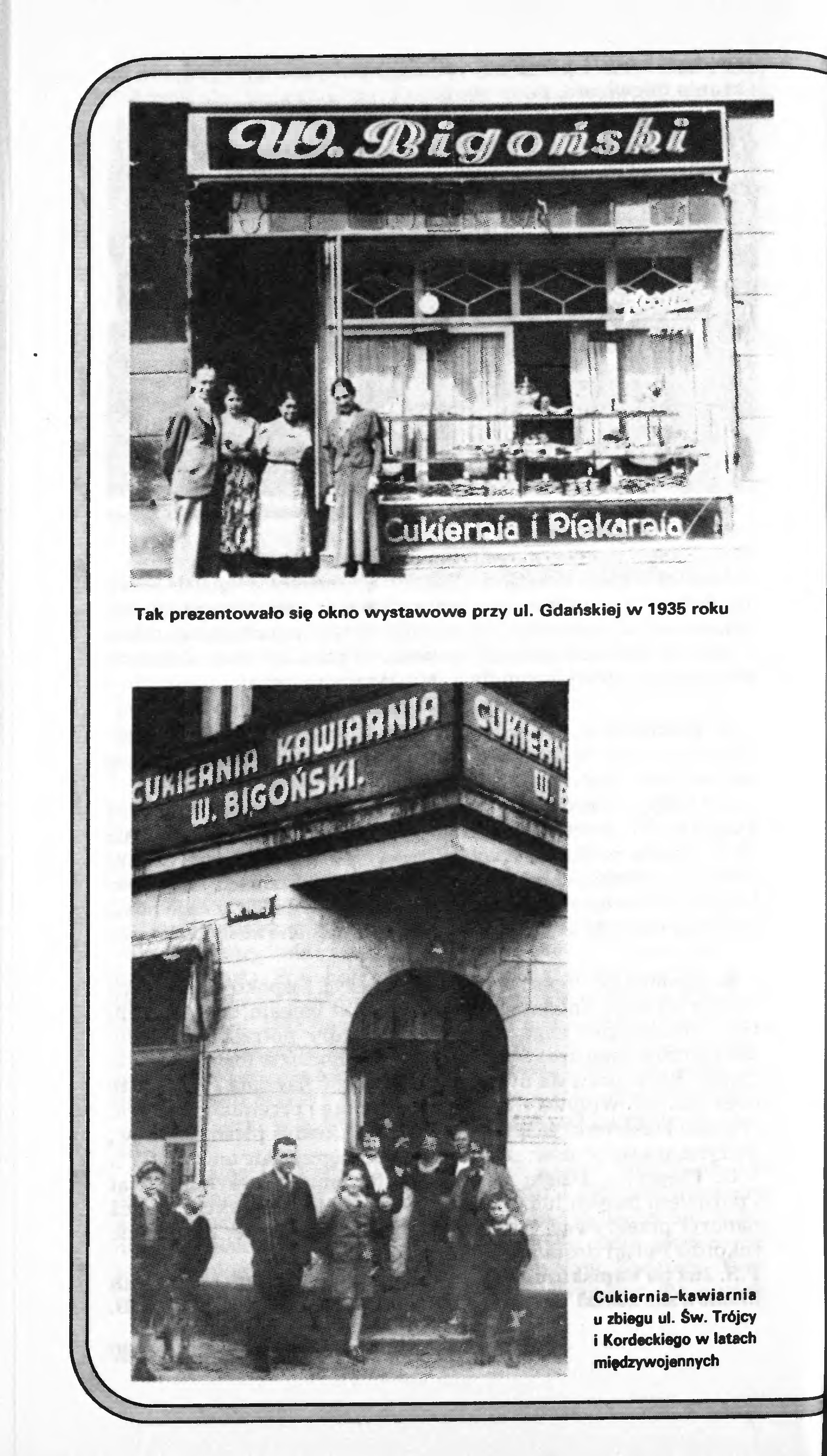
Pictures from 1935

Tenement at 1

1937

Modernism

The facade recalls other similar edifices from the same period, such as tenements at 100 Gdańska Street by Paweł Wawrzon, at 17 Jana Zamoyskiego Street by Jan Kossowski or at 5 Libelta street by Bogdan Raczkowski.

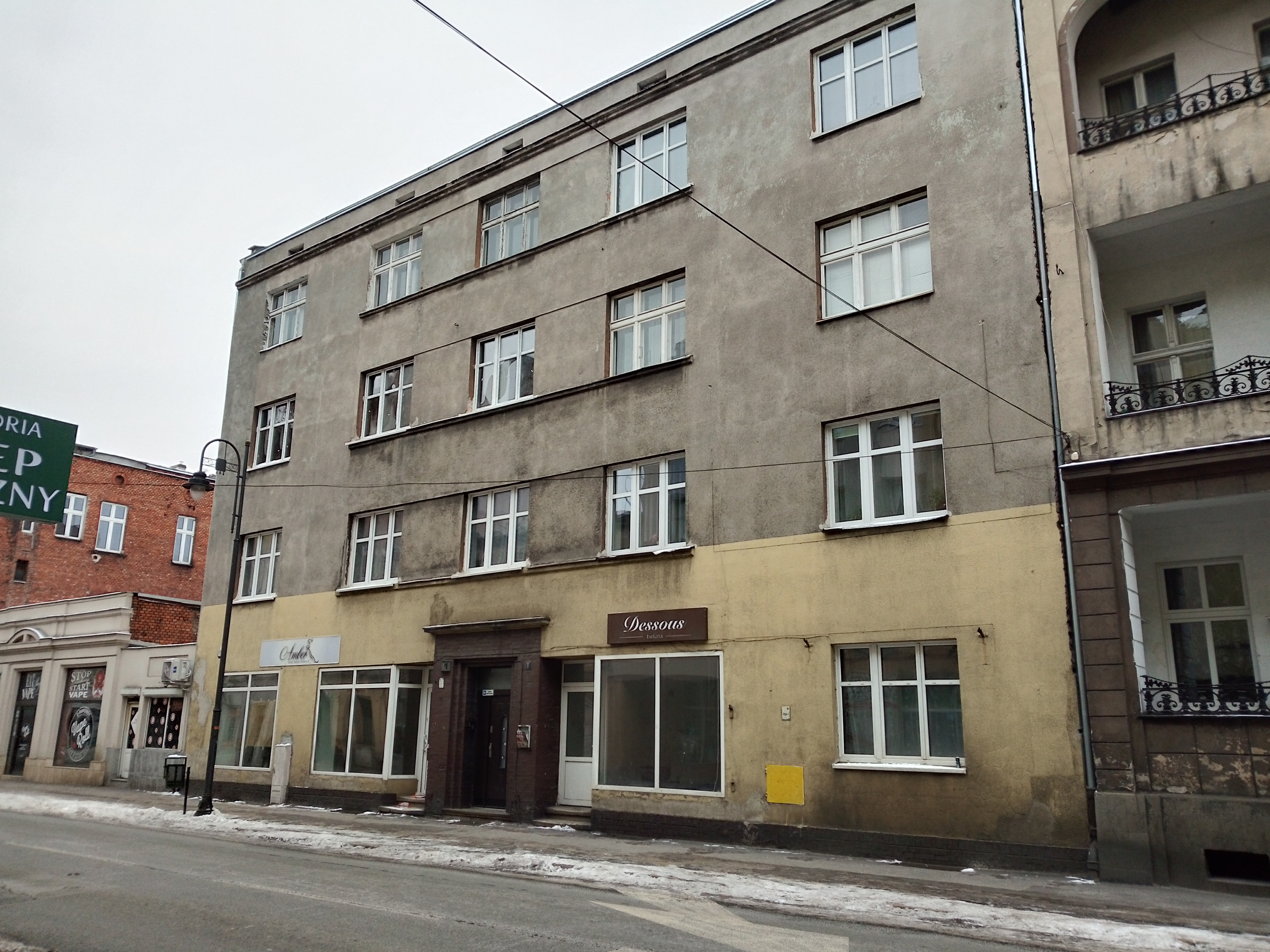
View from the street

Tenement at 3

1893

Eclecticism

The first registered landlord was Alexander Grabowski, a locksmith. During the construction, Józef Święcicki worked on the building on the second floor.

The facade displays a nice wooden carved double door with a fanlight. One can notice in addition on both sides the stacked balconies-loggias embellished with a fine wrought iron railing.

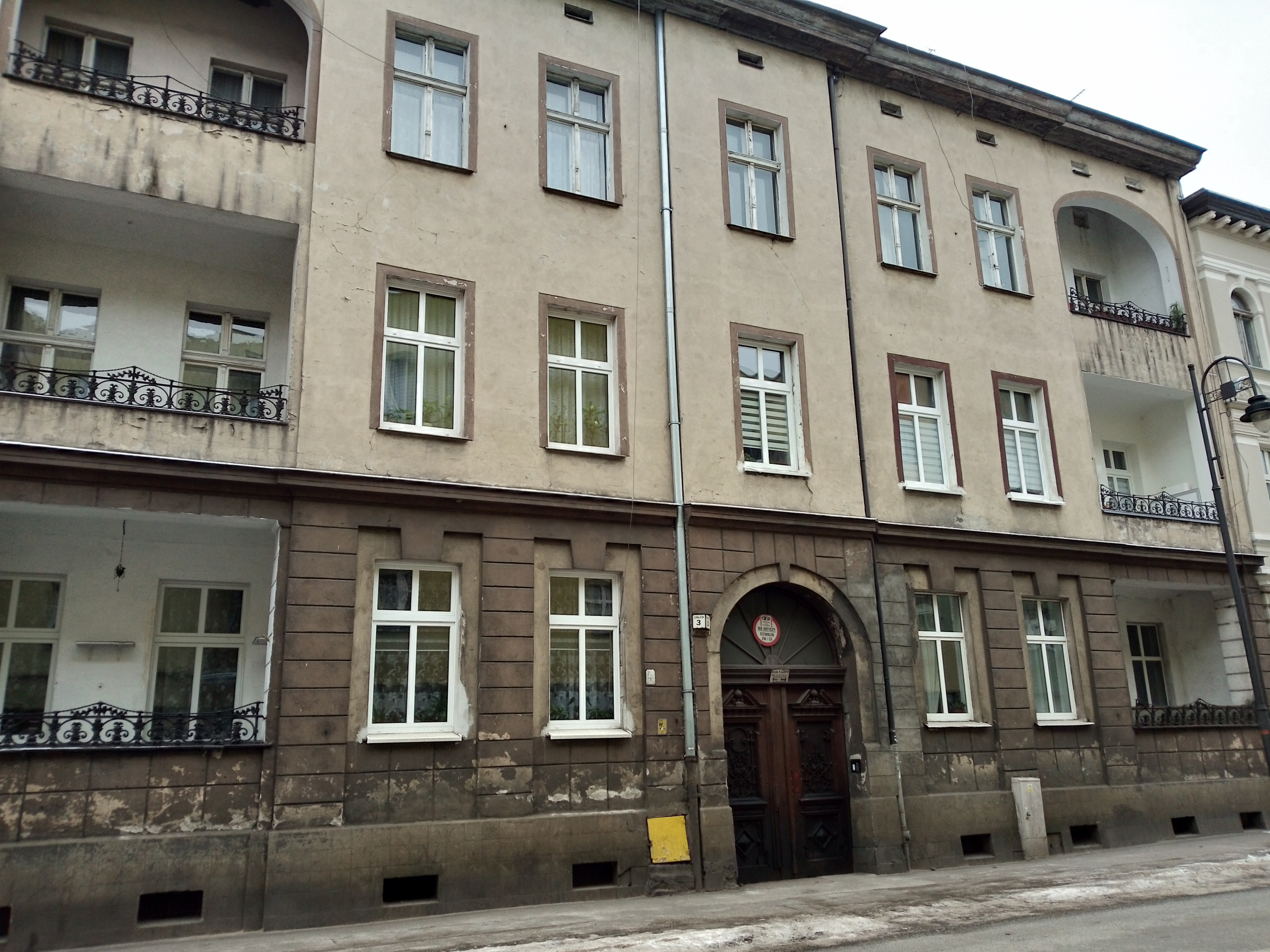
Main frontage onto the street

Tenement at 5

1890

Eclecticism

The first owner at then "13 Johannisstrasse" listed at its inception was Justine Kirchner, a rentier. At the same time, Józef Święcicki worked on the building on the second floor for A. Kasprowicz, a rentier.

The frontage has been refurbished and boasts bossage details, adorned pediments and a dentil running along the top of the facade.

Elevation onto the street

Tenement at 7

1890-1891

Eclecticism

The commissioner of the tenement was Emil ßeßolt, registered as a secretary. He lived at the abutting Nr.9 (then "15 Johannisstrasse").

The building's elevation mirrors the neighbouring one at Nr.5, with the same architectural details (bossage, pediments and a dentil running along the top of the facade).

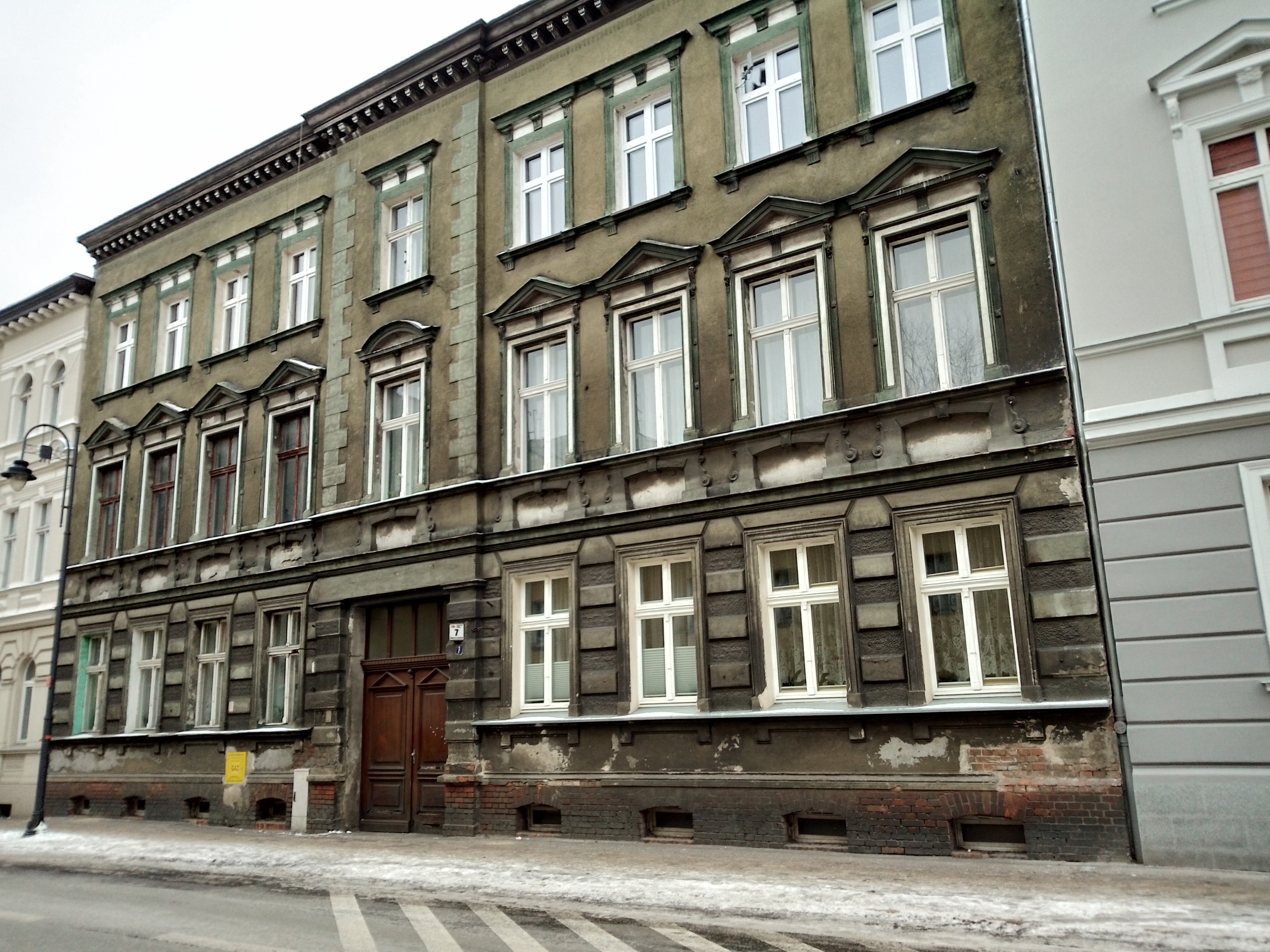
Elevation onto the street

Tenement at 9

1889-1890

Eclecticism

Emil ßeßolt, a secretary, lived there: he also owned the building at Nr.7.

The building's elevation continues the decoration one can find at Nos 5 or 7, with bossage, pediments and a dentil. Renovated in 2020/2021, one can also notice the pair of lesenes flanking the main entrance.

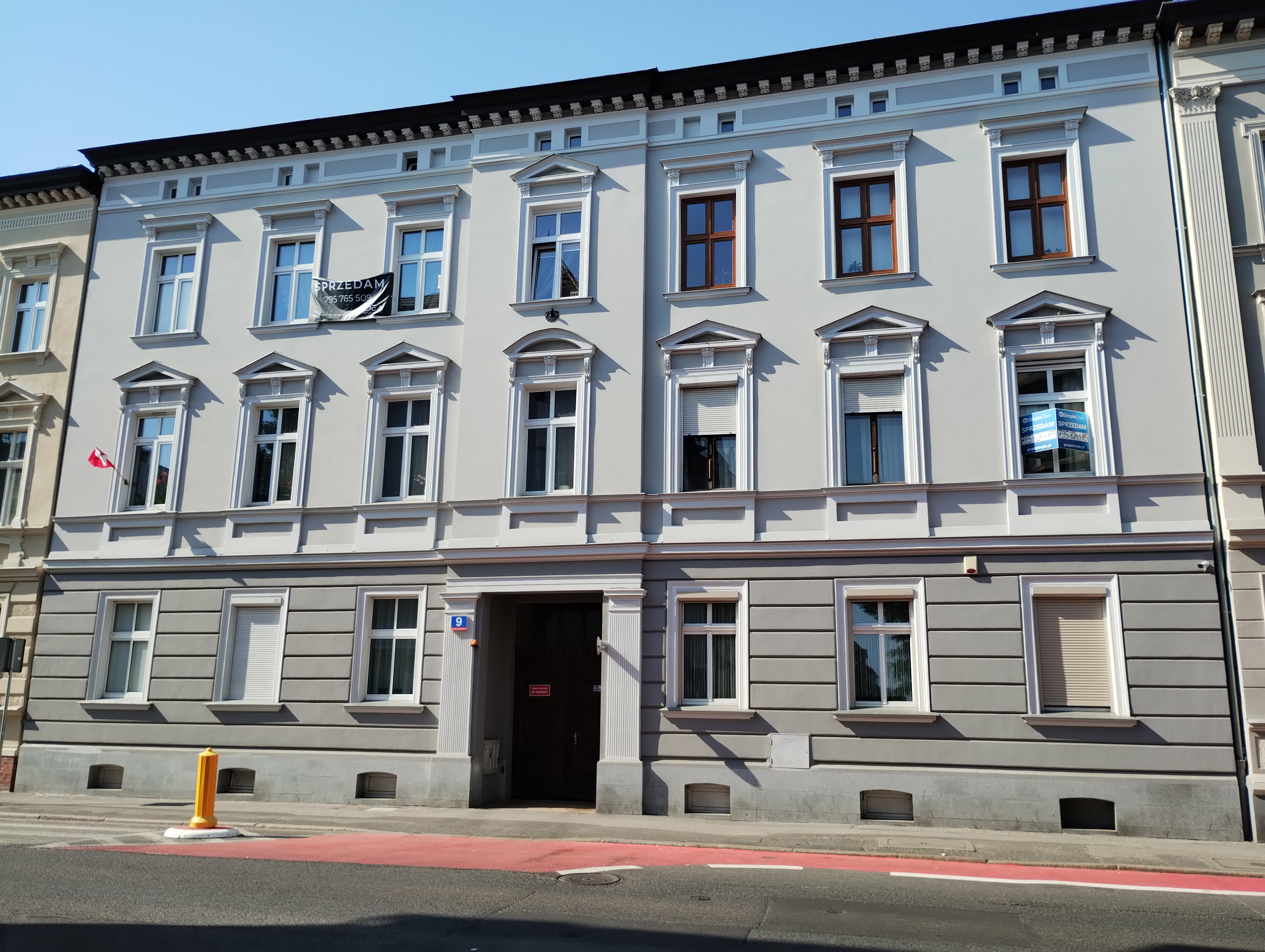
View of the main frontage

August Leu tenement at 11

1887-1888

Eclecticism

August Leu (or Lew) was a master bricklayer. He lived at "26 Sedanstraße", today's Chocimska street.

Like the preceding buildings, the restored elevation displays eclectic features. However, specific to this tenement are the lesenes framing both ends of the facade, the embellished cartouches, the columns flanking the main entrance and the balustrades at each upper floor overlooking the main door.

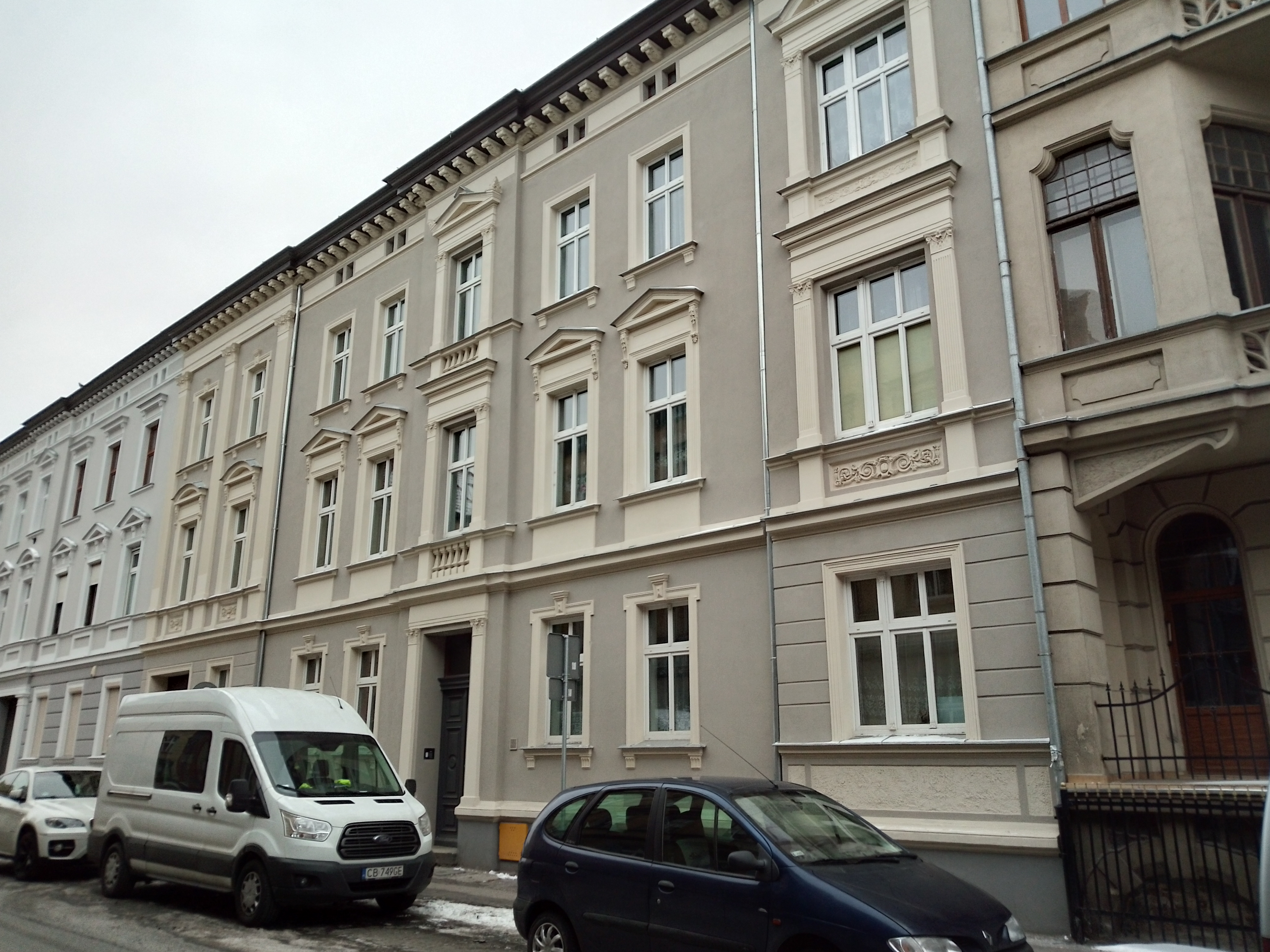
Main frontage

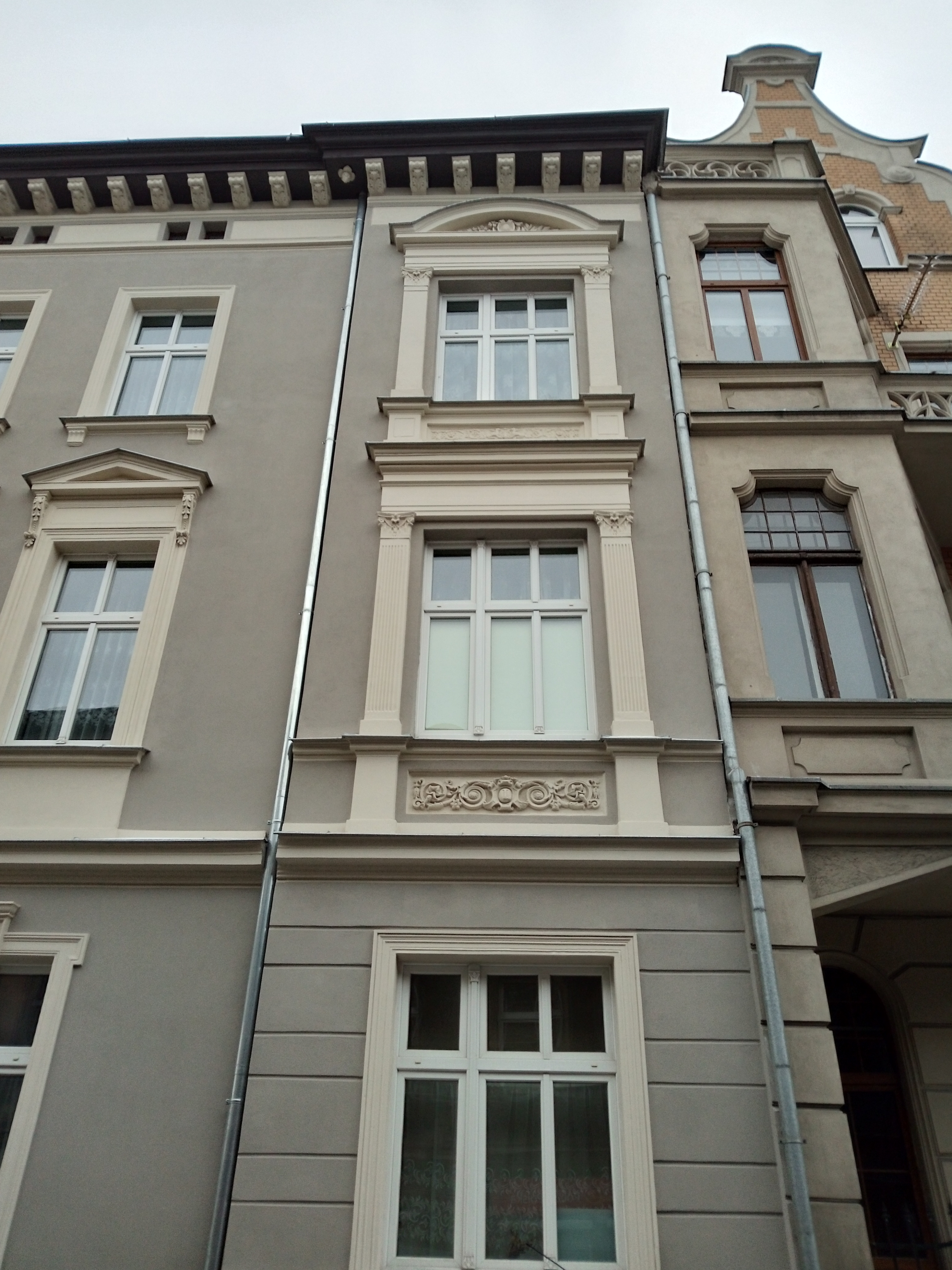
Left side detail

Bruno Böhm tenement at 13

Registered on Kuyavian-Pomeranian Voivodeship heritage list, Nr.725835, A/1527 issued on May 5, 2009

1899-1903

Eclecticism

Bruno Böhm was a member of the Prussian Commercial Council (German: Königl Gewerberat), who lived there till WWI.

The elevation displays a variety of architectural features, standing out among the other façades in the street. Hence one can appreciate balconies and terraces with sculpted balustrades, mullion windows, a grilled entrance door and elaborated ogee shaped front-gables.

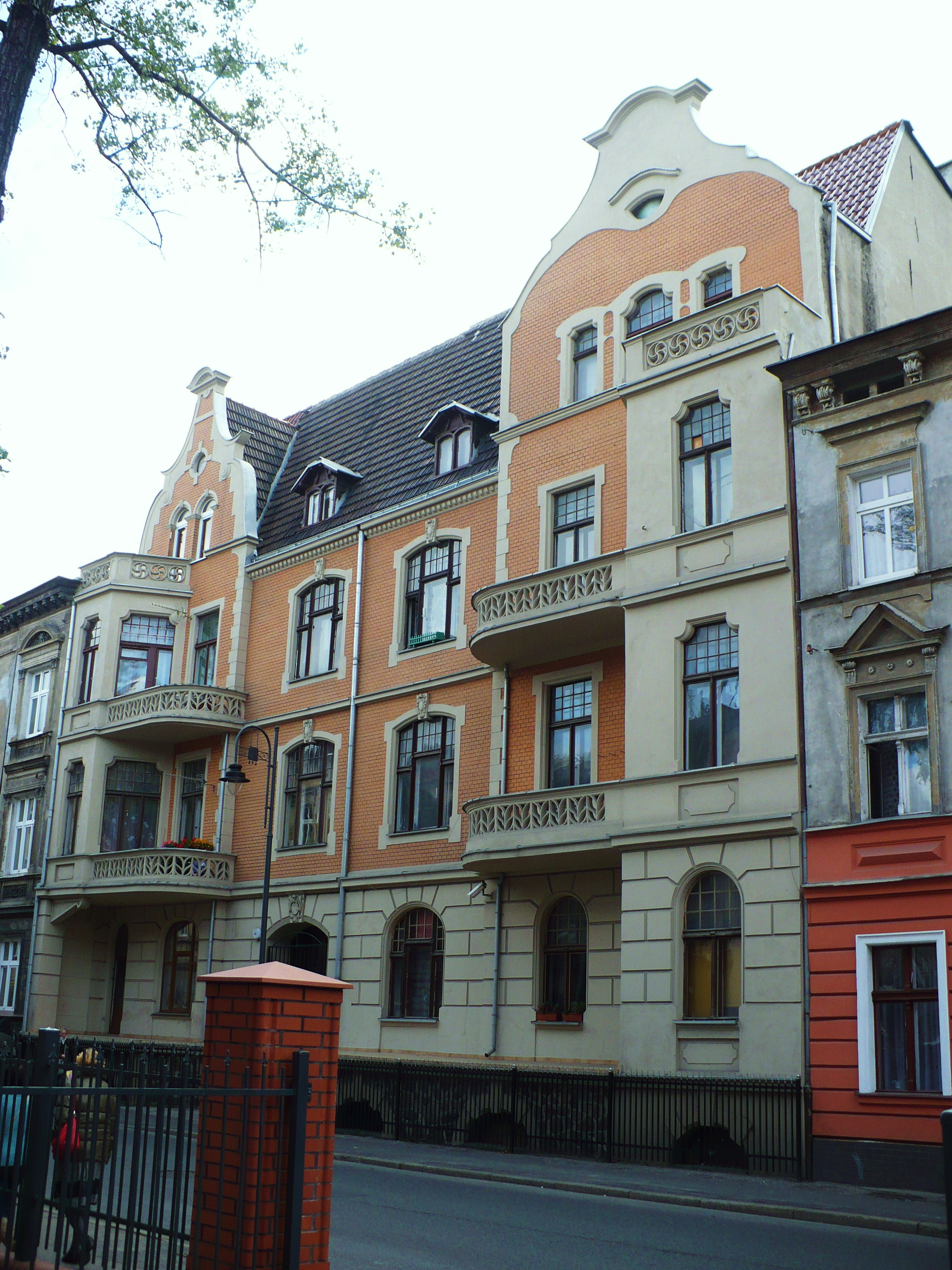
Main frontage

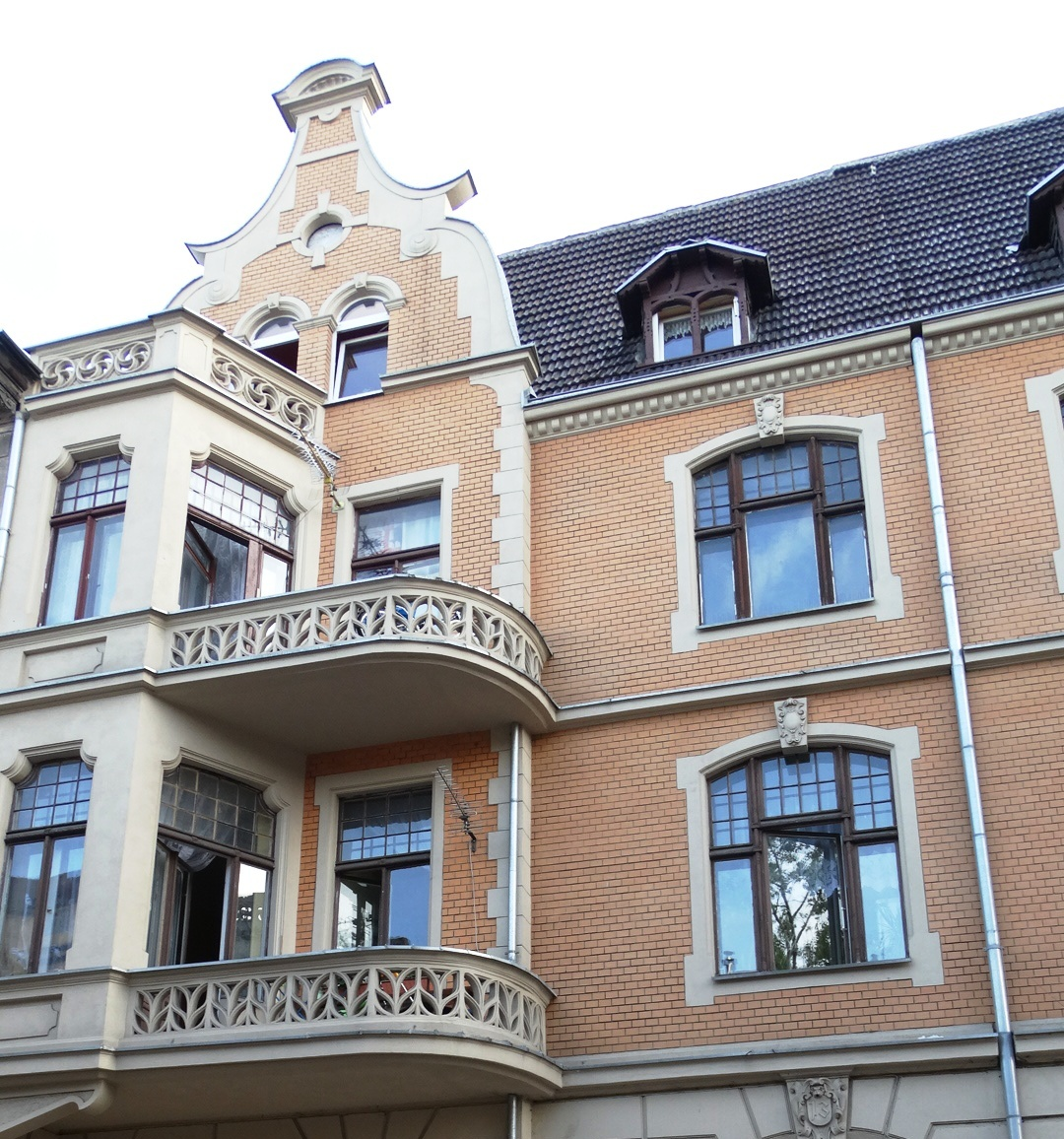
Detail of the balcnies, terraces and left gable

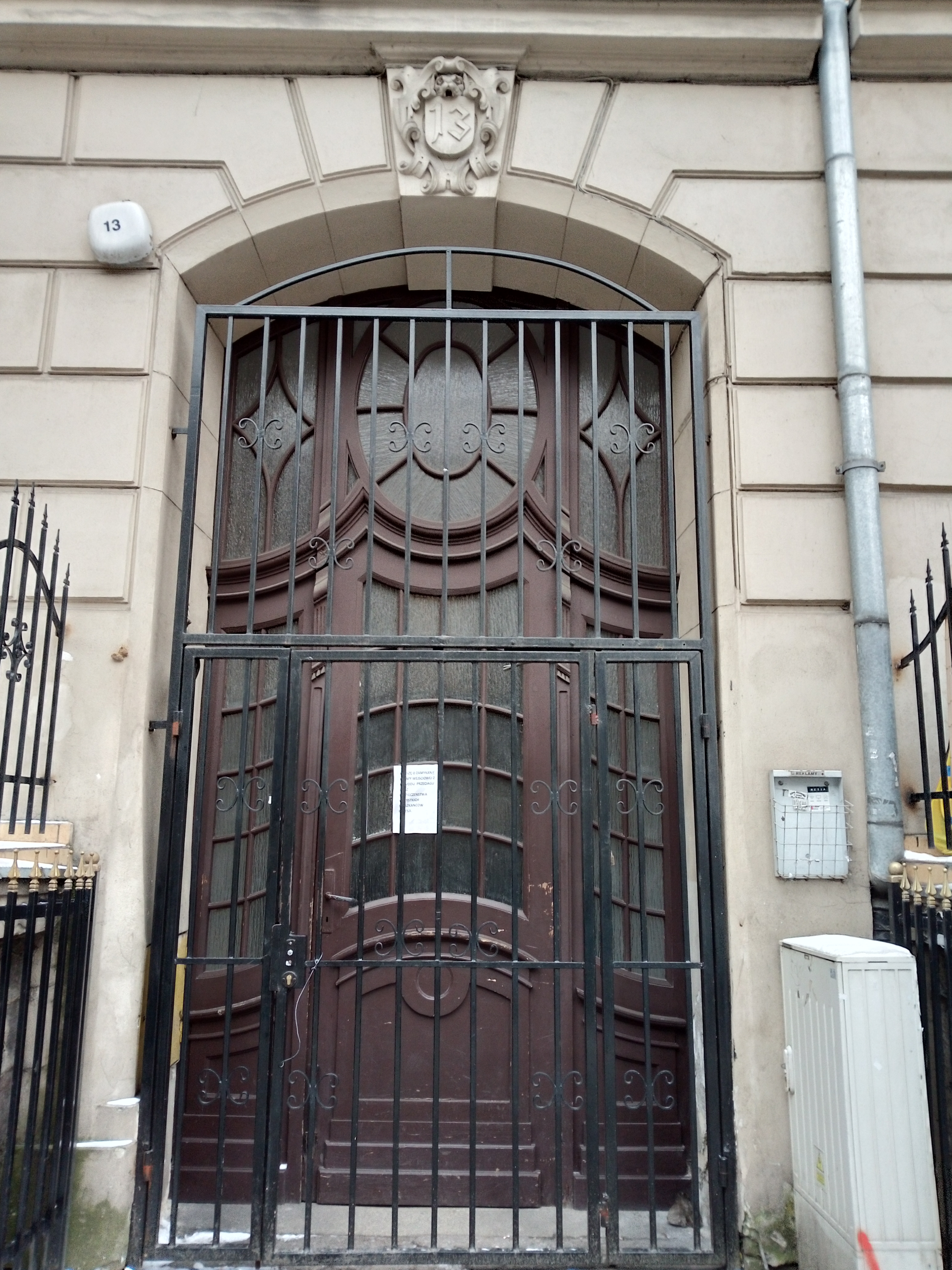
Adorned grilled door

Tenement at 14, corner with Kościuszki street

1912

Early Modern architecture

The first owner was Veronika Szeszinski, the widow of laborer (German: arbeiter).

Although the straight lines of the facade tend to reveal early modernist trends, one can still notice the Art Nouveau influence in the round bay window or the wooden pitch roof visible on top of the frontage onto Kościuszki street. Furthermore, the entrance on Świętojańska street kept preserved a beautiful wrought iron grille bearing the date of inception "1907".

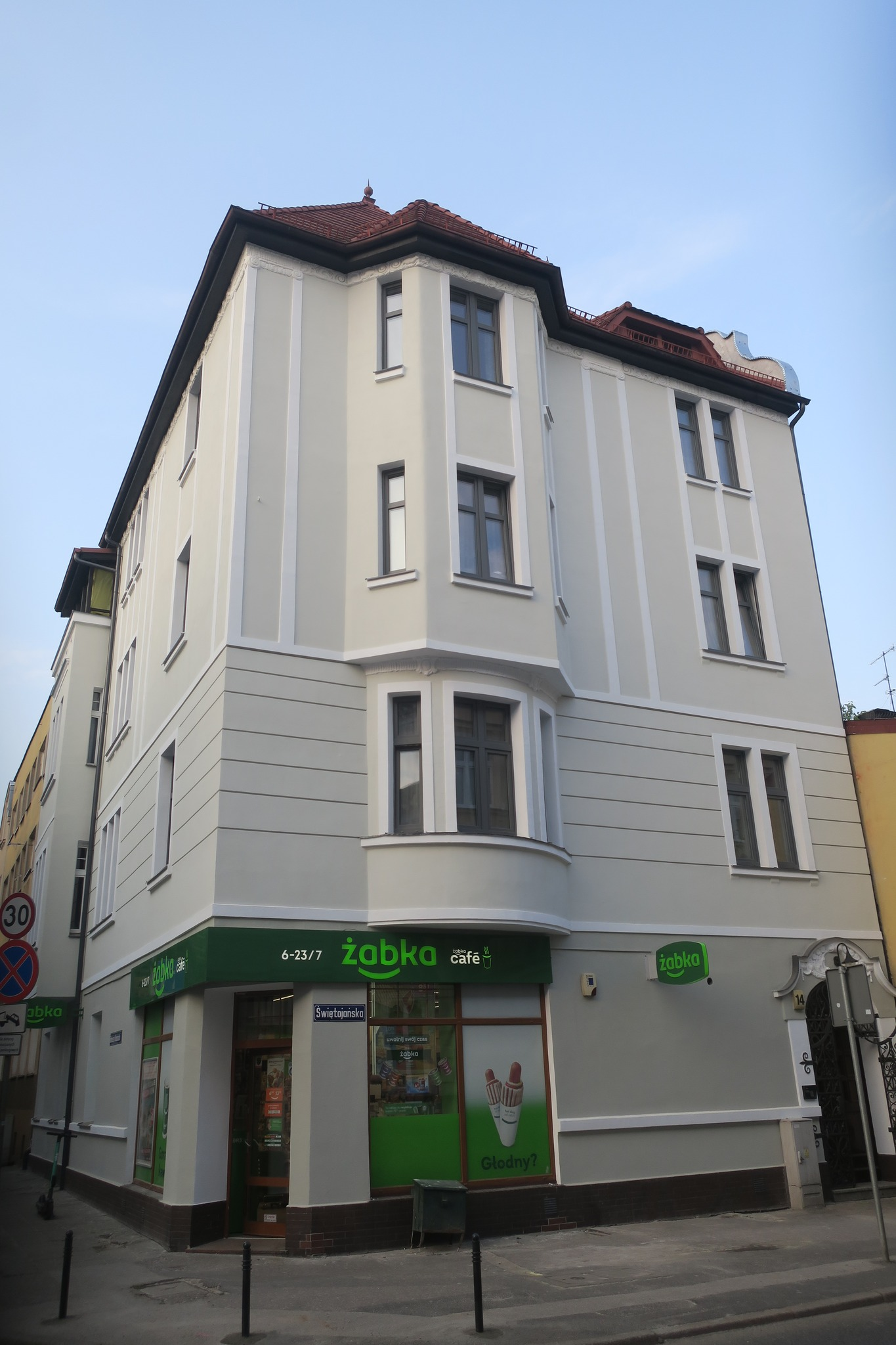
View from the street

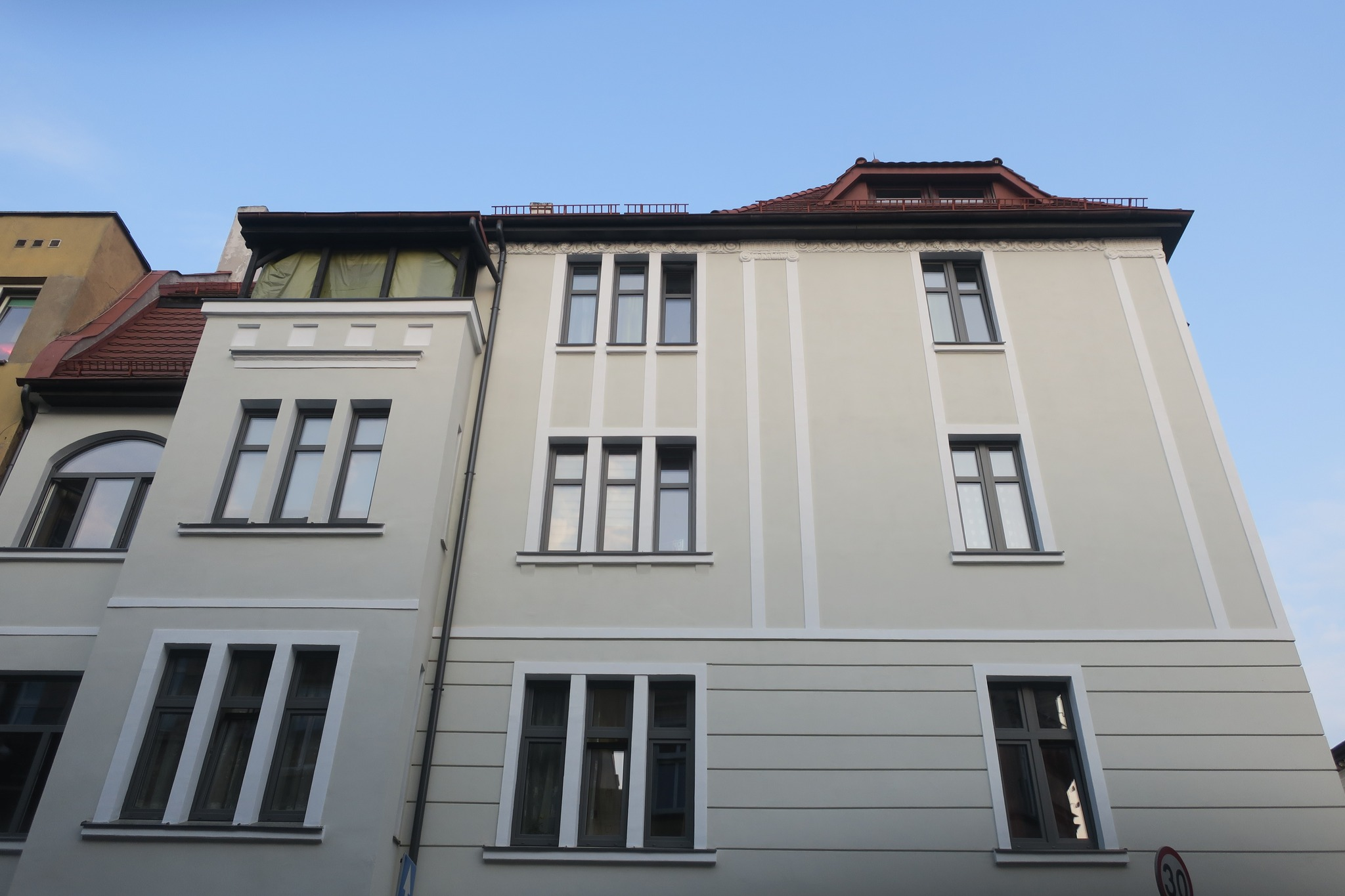
Facade on Kościuszki street

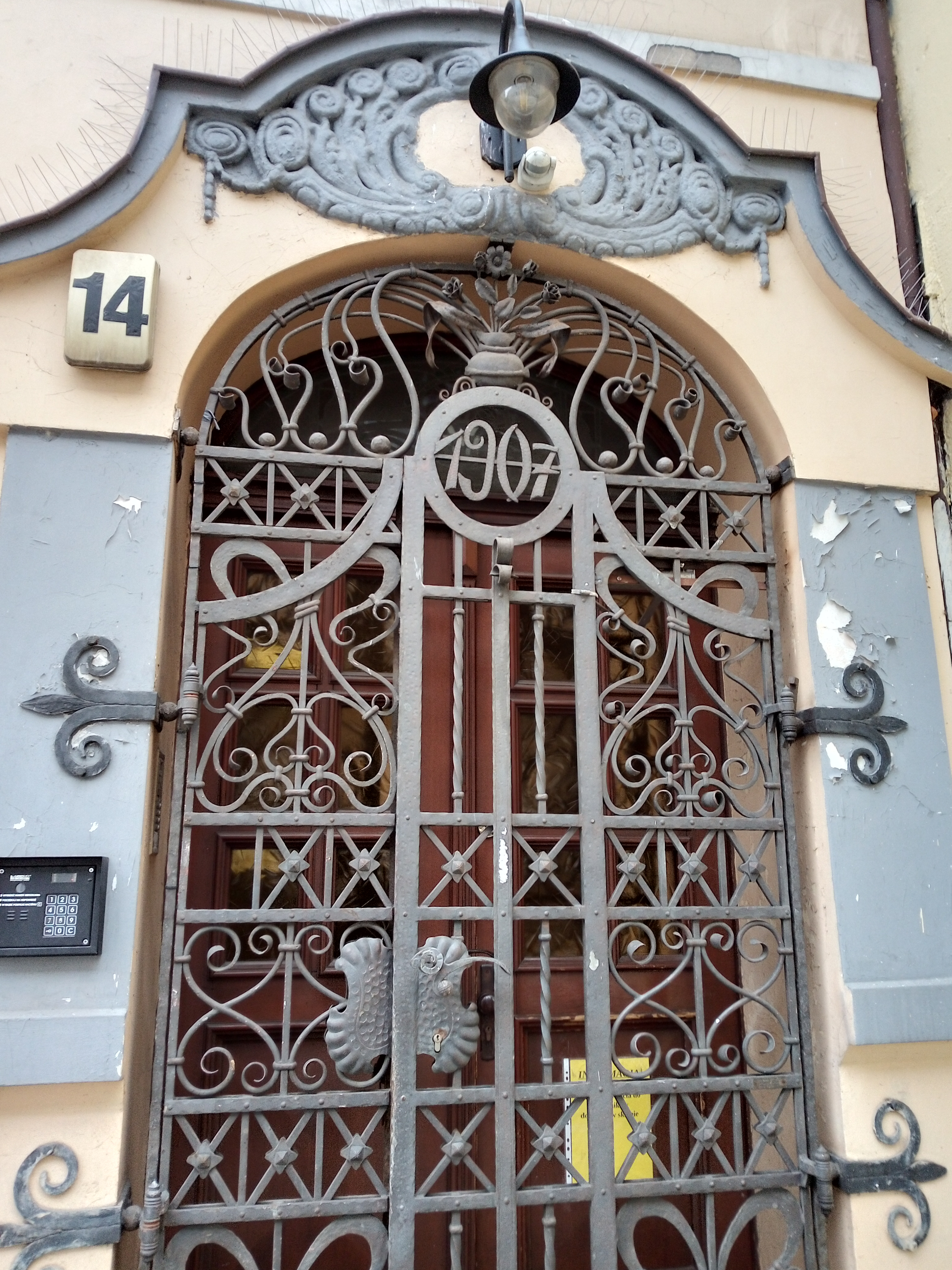
Grilled entrance door

Tenement at 15

1896

Eclecticism

The first identified landlord was Bartholomäus Ferrari, a baker, who lived at "33 Rinkauerstraße", today's crossing with Pomorska street.

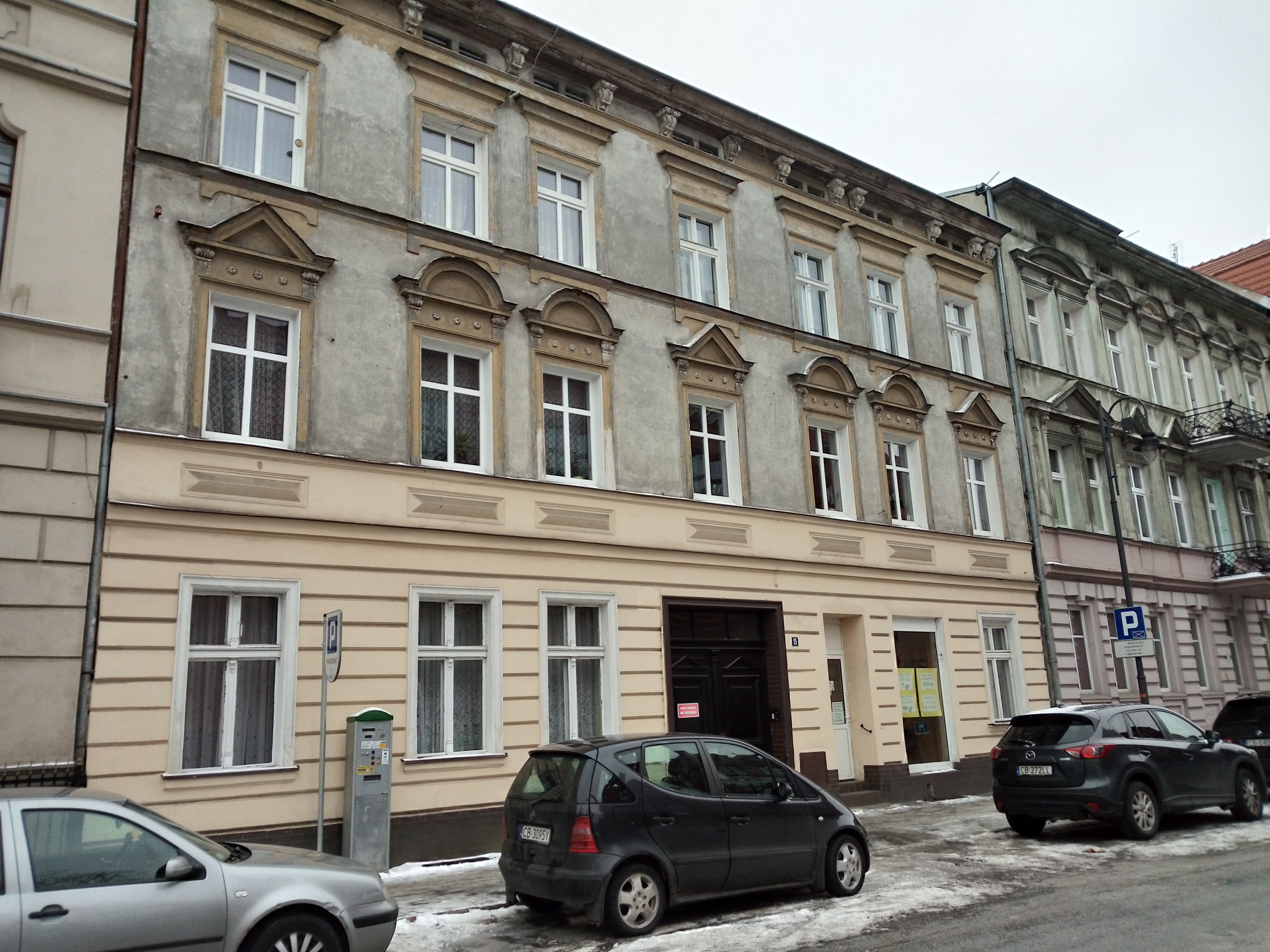
Main elevation

Tenement at 16, corner with Kościuszki street

1888-1889

Eclecticism

The commissioner of the building was Julius Schlauke, living at "10 Brunnenstraße" (today's Chwytowo street). He was a restaurateur in the nearby city of Ostromecko, east of Bydgoszcz, located along the Vistula river.

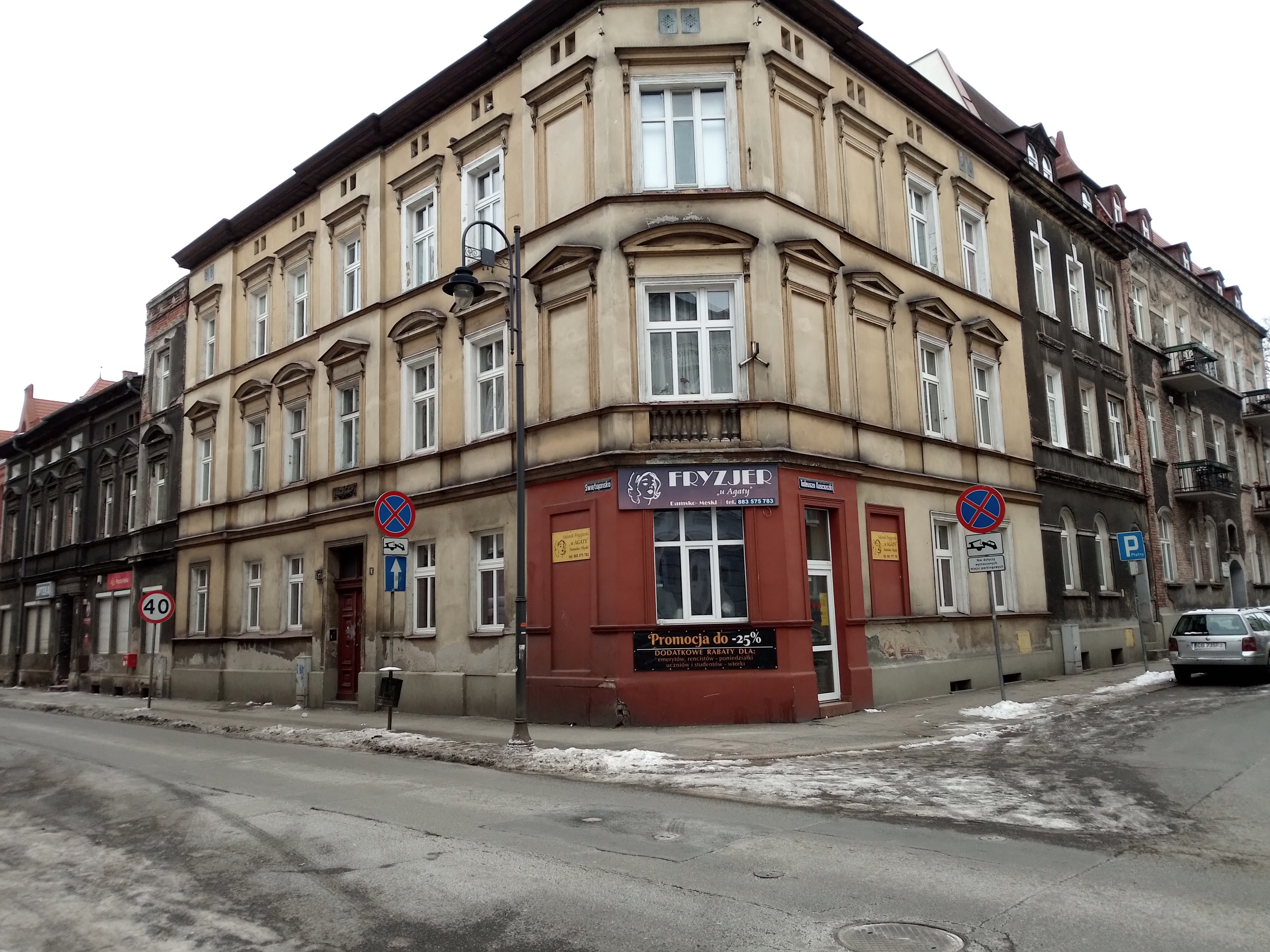
Corner view of the building

Tenement at 17

1895-1897

Eclecticism

Bartholomäus Ferrari, owner of the tenement at Nr.15 and living at "33 Rinkauerstraße", also possessed this building.

Both edifices have been erected at the same period: they logically features the same architectural style (bossage, pediments, corbels). However, the facade at N.17 draws attention with its two balconies adorned with a stylish wrought iron fencing.

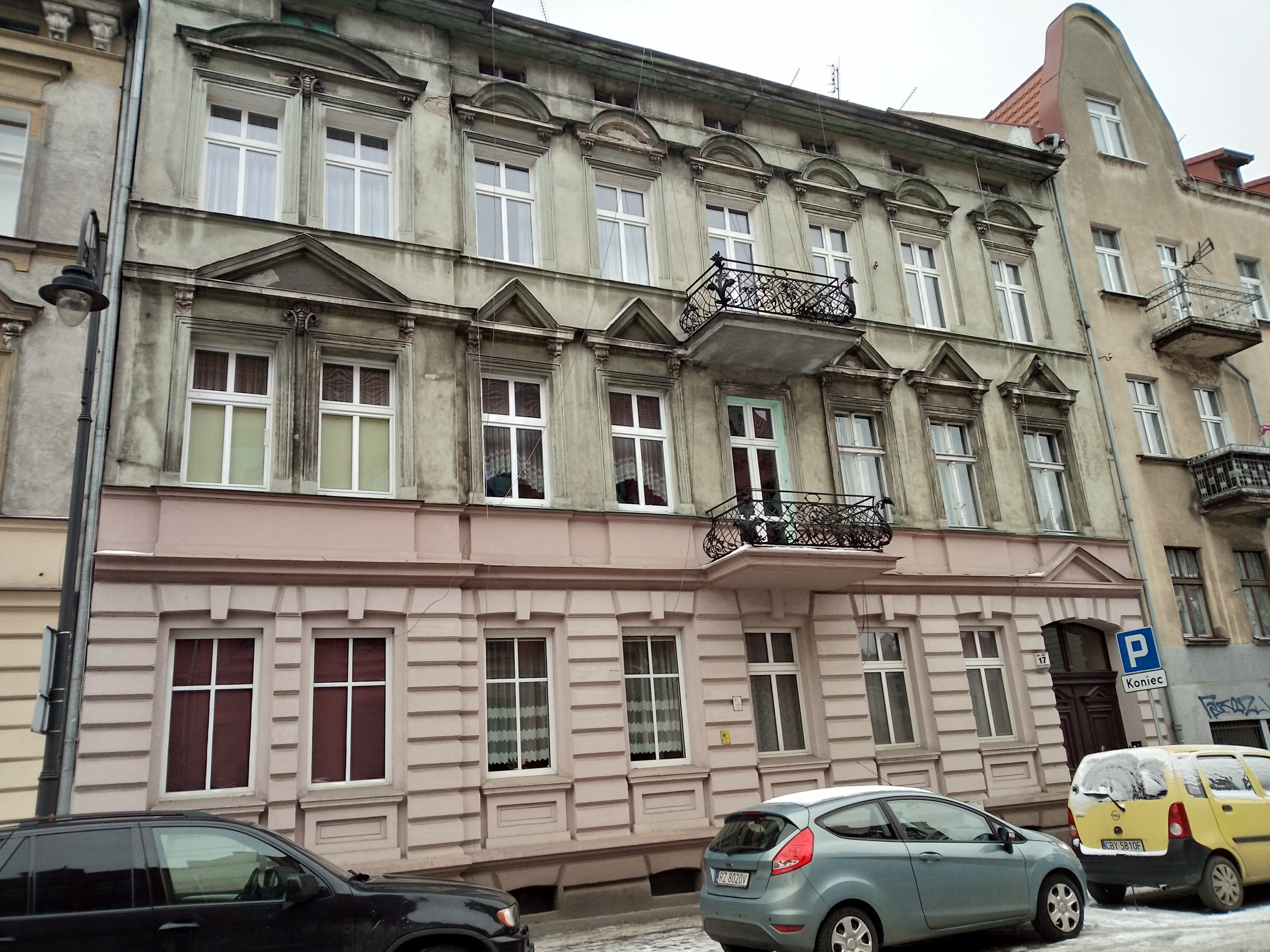
Main elevation

Tenement at 18

1888

Eclecticism

Adolf Artkopf, a railway secretary, is registered as the first landlord.

One of the oldest standing building in the street, the facade offers to the viewer some details, albeit it needs renovation. One can mention the front entrance, flanked by lesenes and a heavy lintel, as well as the winged figure ornamenting the first floor pediment above the door.

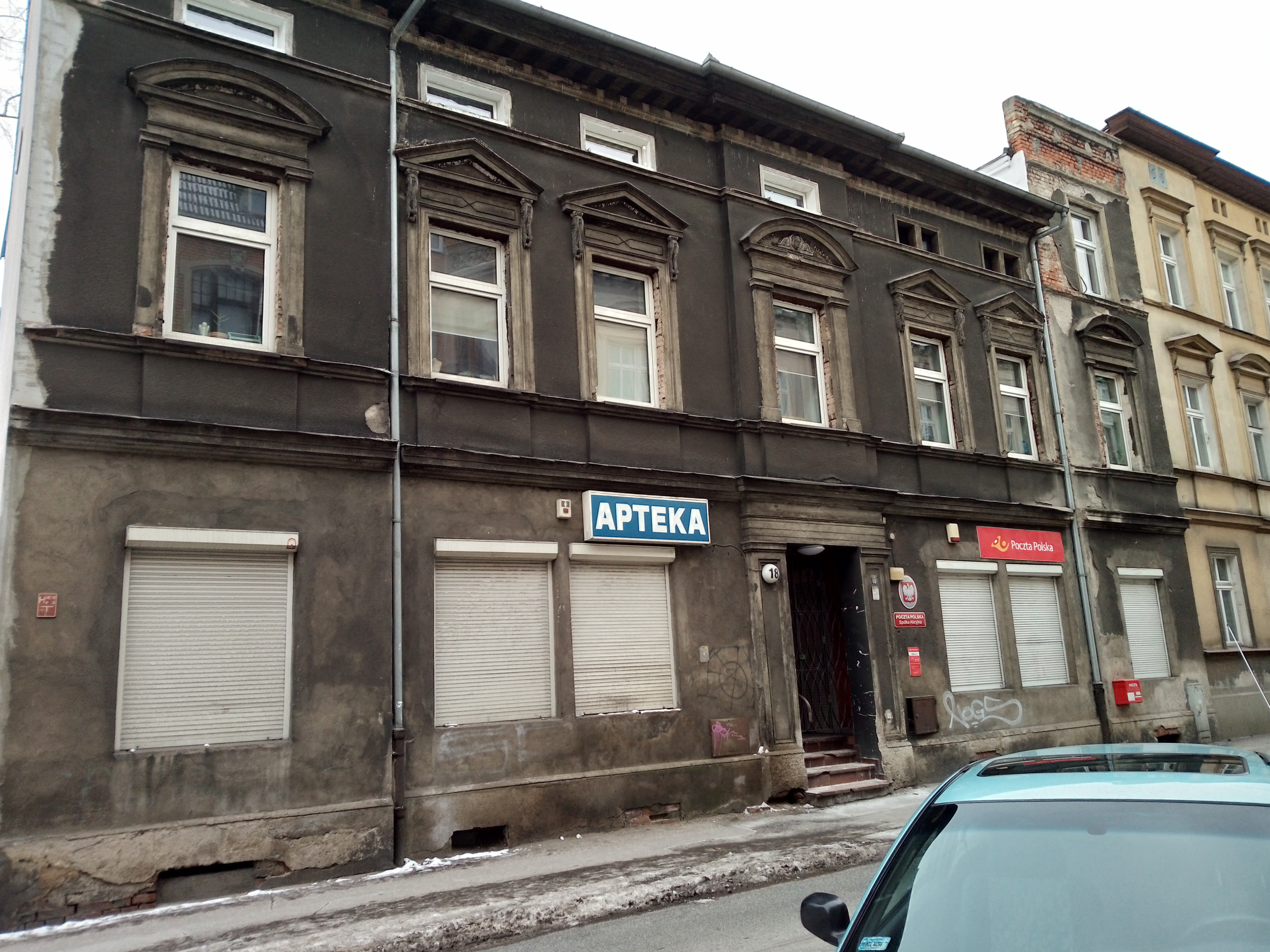
Facade onto the street

Tenement at 19

1910-1912

Early Modern architecture, elements of Art Nouveau

The owner was Reinhold Jacobi, a merchand living at "9 Viktoriastraße", present day 3 Królowej Jadwigi street.

On the frontage, the early modernist trends are still under the influence of Art Nouveau, in particular in the round shaped wall gables and the bedecked portal. On the other hand, the balconies display straight modernist features.

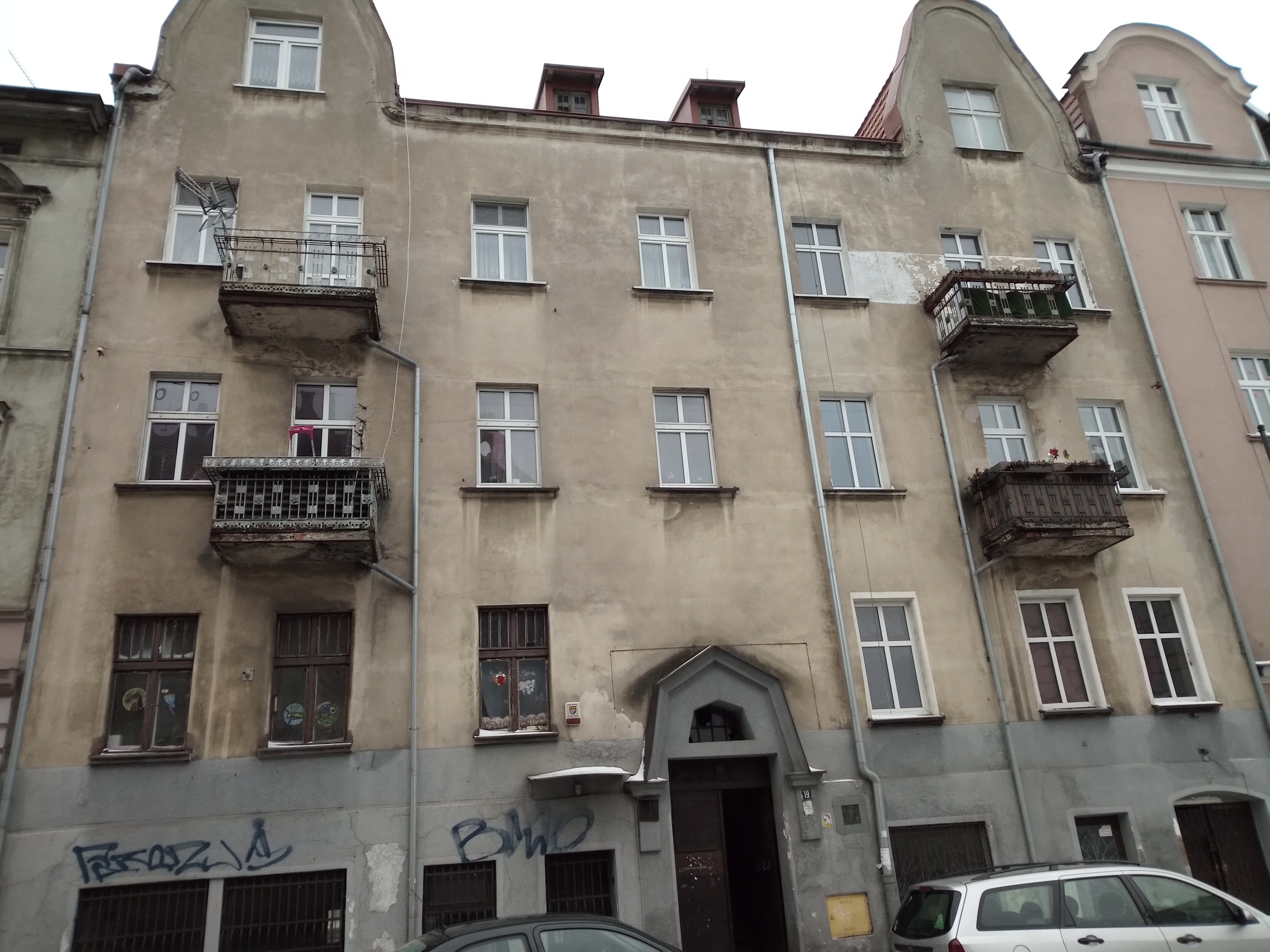
View from the street

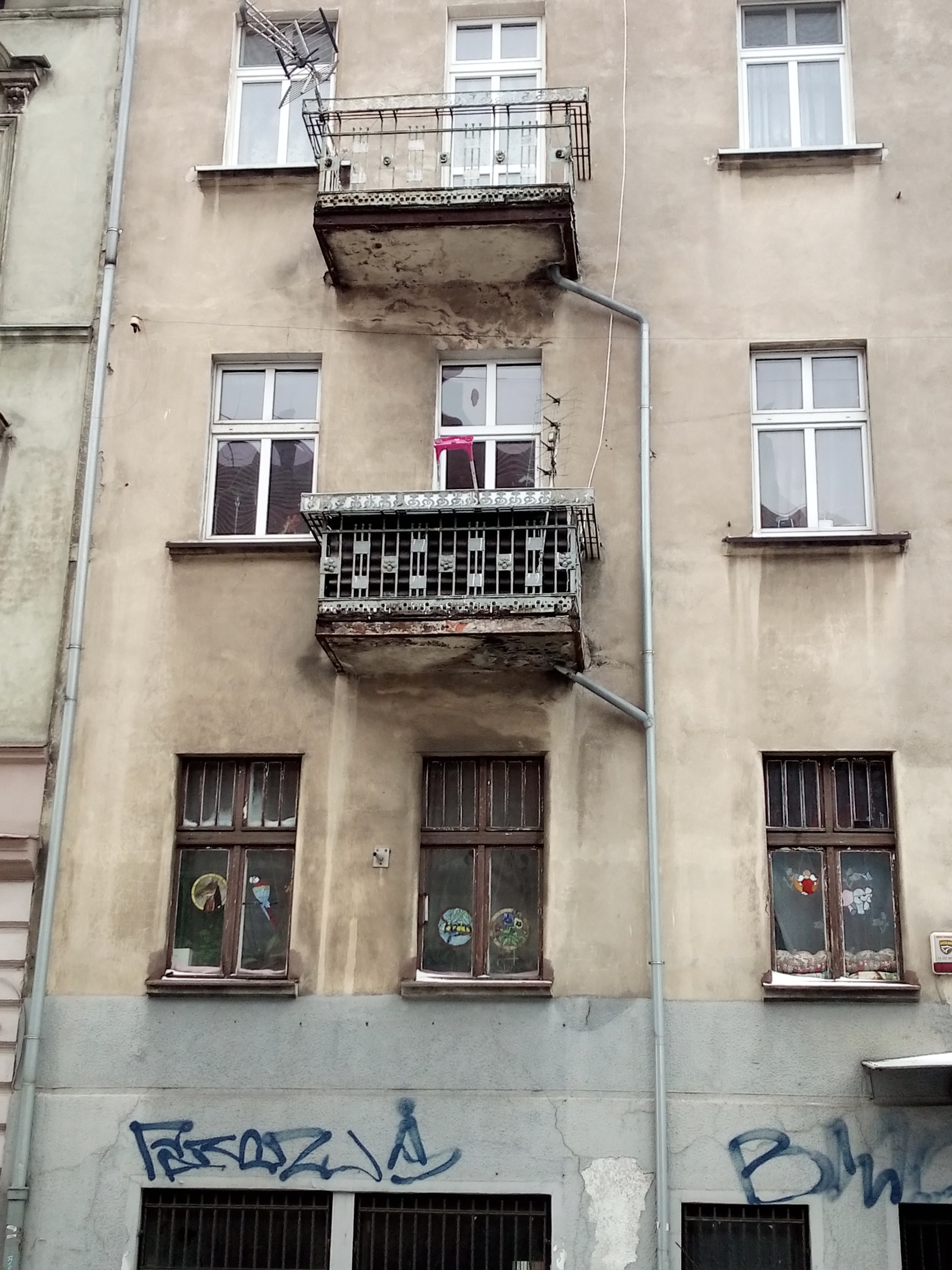
Detail of the balconies

Building of the Collegium Medicum at 20

Registered on Kuyavian-Pomeranian Voivodeship heritage list, Nr.601421-A/1064 issued on June 30, 1995.

1887–1888, by Carl Meyer

Historicism

The building was erected as an elementary school, called "Johannischule", due to its location. The project was performed by Carl Meyer, then the municipal construction counselor: it was the first large building dedicated to education constructed in downtown district. As originally planned, the institution consisted of two separate schools (girls and boys), hence its official name "Doppel Volksschule" (English: Double elementary school). Each school had a separate main entrance, with the same room lay out and identical functions. In these schools, instruction was performed in German, for children between 6 and 14 years old. At its creation, there were only 7 similar schools in the city, but in 1911, this number had doubled.

In 1913, the school was struggling with housing problems and had to create an auxiliary boy school (German: Hilfschule) in a building at "49 Bahnhofstrasse", today's 100 Dworcowa Street, owned by Albin Cohnfeld. After the necessary adaptation works completed on August 1, 1913, the school department operated at least until April 1, 1918. After the recreation of the Polish State, two non-German schools were set up here in 1921-1922:

- a Catholic school headed by Paweł Sekura, operating at least until 1926–1927;
- a former Evangelical school, led by Fritz Hopp. It ceased to operate in 1924.

In the late 1920s, the place was taken over by a Polish mixed school, run till 1936/37 by Hieronim Ewaid, the previous head of the General School at Dąbrowskiego street in Szwederowo district.

At the end of WWII, the Primary School Nr.4 was set up there, named after Maria Konopnicka.

In the 1960s, part of the edifice harboured the School Youth Hostel, which has been operating till the mid-1990s.

In the 1970s, were established here a "Basic Vocational School" and a "Vocational High School" specialized in mechanical engineering.

In 2003, the municipal authorities handed over the facility to the Medical Academy of Bydgoszcz, renamed "Collegium Medicum" the following year after its merging with Nicolaus Copernicus University in Toruń. Therefore, since 2010, the building has been housing university units, such as: Physical Education and Sport College, Social Medicine College, the Department of Fundamentals of Physical Culture and the Department of Manual Therapy.

The brick edifice presents an axis of symmetry in its middle part, as a reminder of its initial design for two separate entities. The building architecture uses neo-gothic style, with reference to historicism. It possesses cellars, two levels and a hip roof with dormers. Each entrance is underlined by an avant-corps topped with a stepped gable, each door being framed by an ogival portal. On the first floor, one can appreciate a cordon frieze. The facades are topped with an arcaded frieze and a cornice.

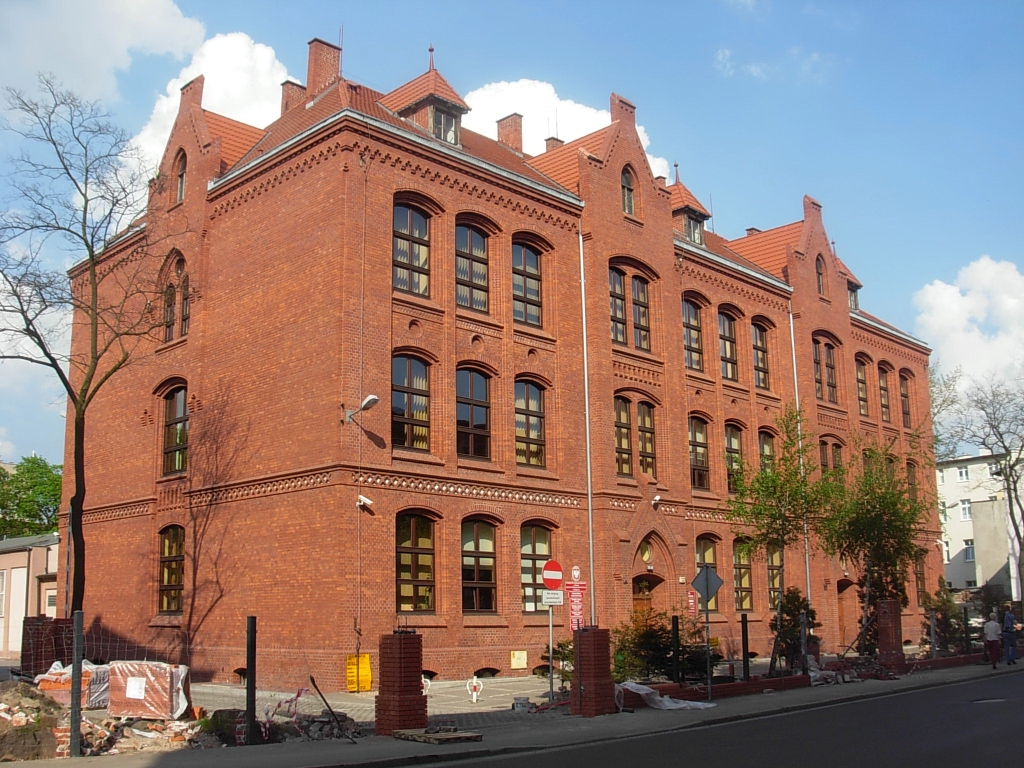
View from the street

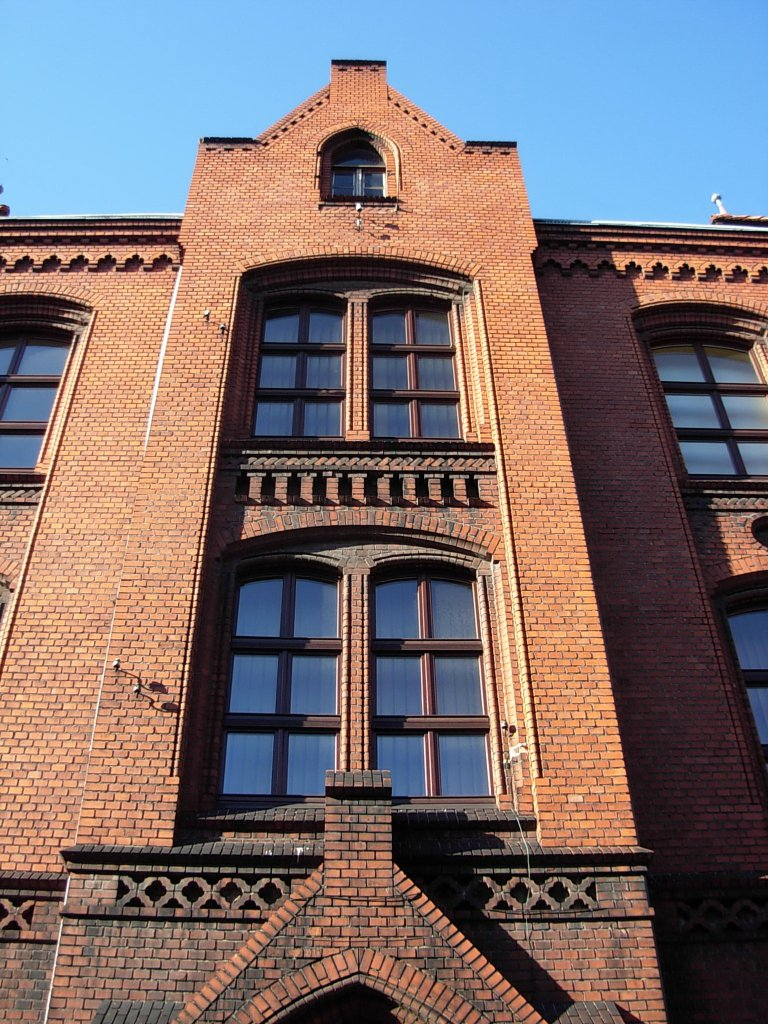
Avant-corps

Tenement at 21, corner with Pomorska Street

1910–1912

Modern architecture

The initial tenement comprised two houses, one on Pomorska street (Rinkauerstraße 33) and the other on Świętojańska street (Johannisstraße 22). The former address was first owned by Bartholomäus Ferrari, a baker, in 1893, while for the latter, the first landlord was Theofil Krüger, a merchant, after completion of the actual corner house.

The facade lacks adornment, except the three pairs of balconies. On the roof, one can notice symmetrical display of various dormers: gable fronted, eyebrow, curved shaped gable wall ones and shed dormers.

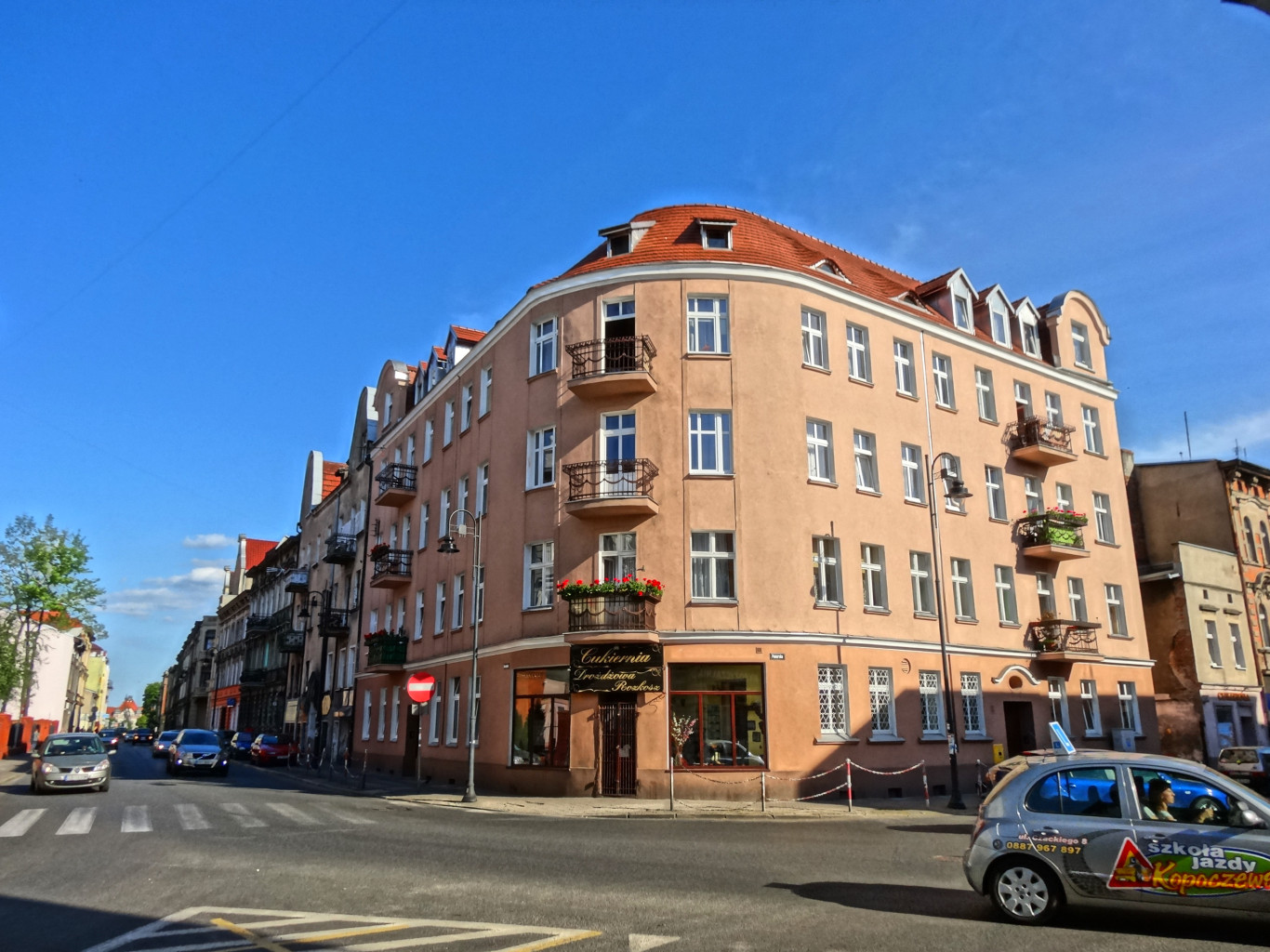
Corner view

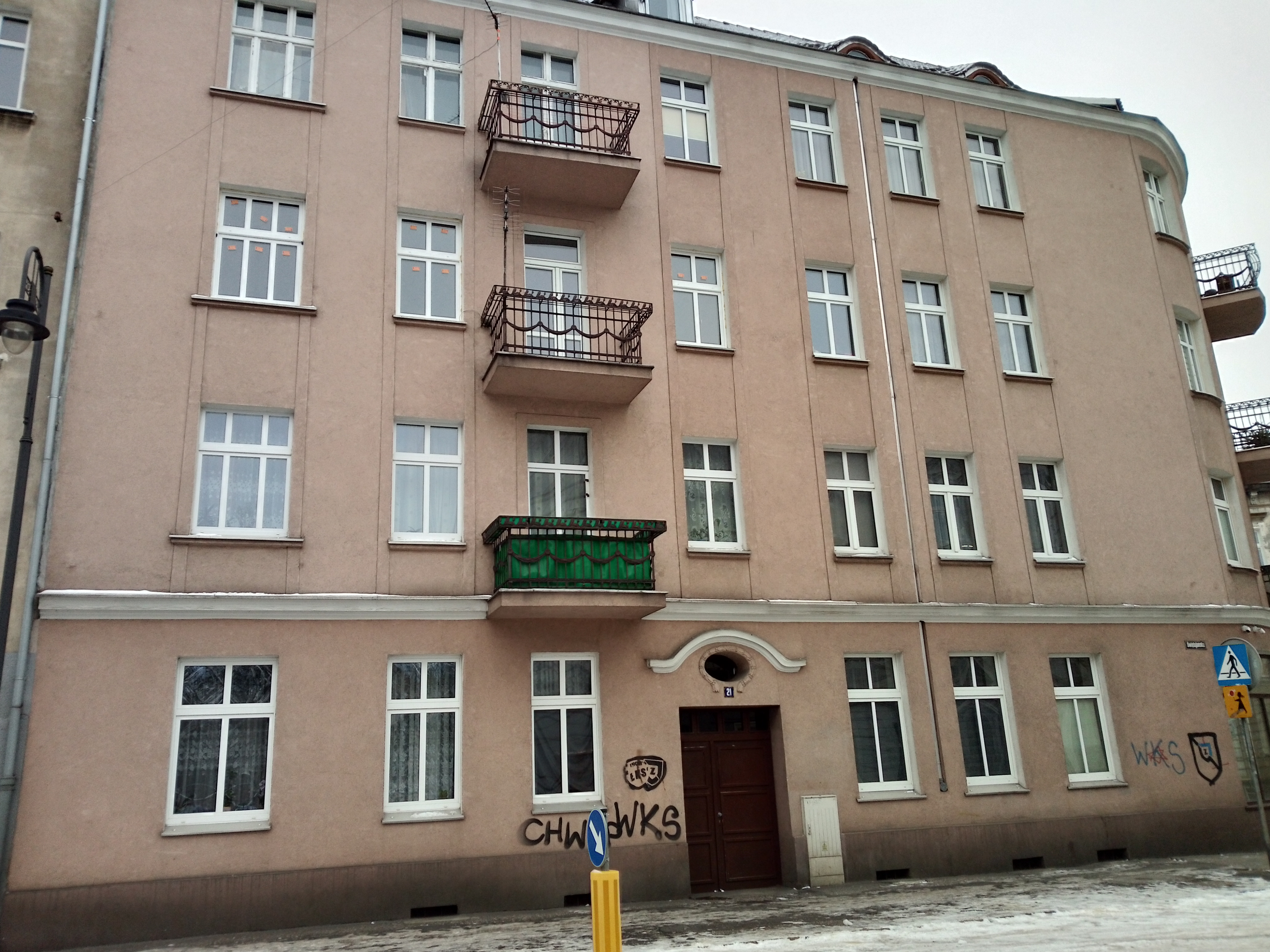
Main elevation on Świętojańska street

Tenement at 22, corner with 74 Pomorska Street

1896–1897

Neo-Renaissance & elements of Neo-Baroque

Julius Hoffman, a secretary, was the first owner of the double house ("1 Johannisstraße 1" and "12 Verl. Rinkauerstraße 12") in 1897, the plot being empty till that time. Two years later, the tenement housed a hardware store. Today, the renovated building is a hotel, Hostel przy Świętojańskiej.

On the one hand, window symmetrical disposition, overall balanced facades, smooth stone walls are characteristics of Neo-Renaissance style, as well as ornately carved stone window trim varying in design at each story and small, square windows on top floor. On the other hand, some elements of Neo-Baroque are popping up on the facade decoration: very complex ornamentation of pediments and wrought iron balconies, large flower motifs on the second floor, topped on each side by a long plain balustrade standing on the roof.

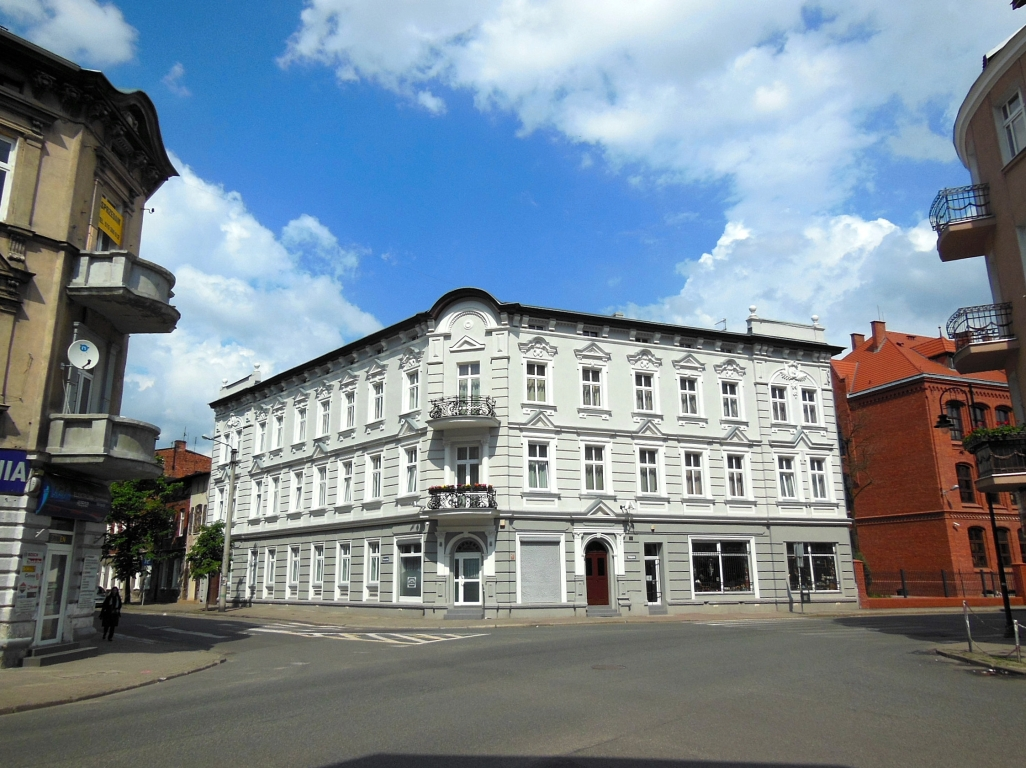
Corner view from street intersection

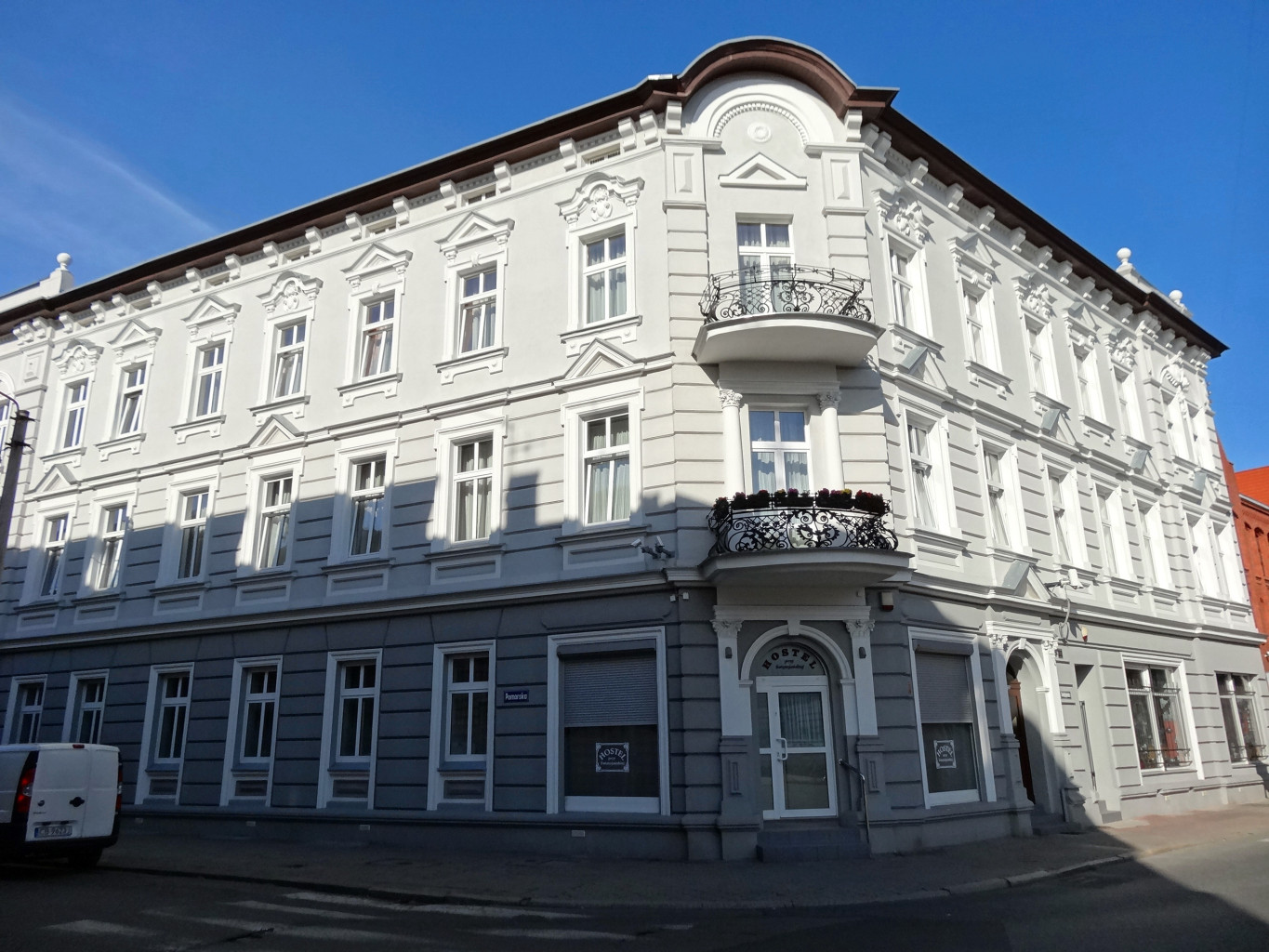
Main elevations

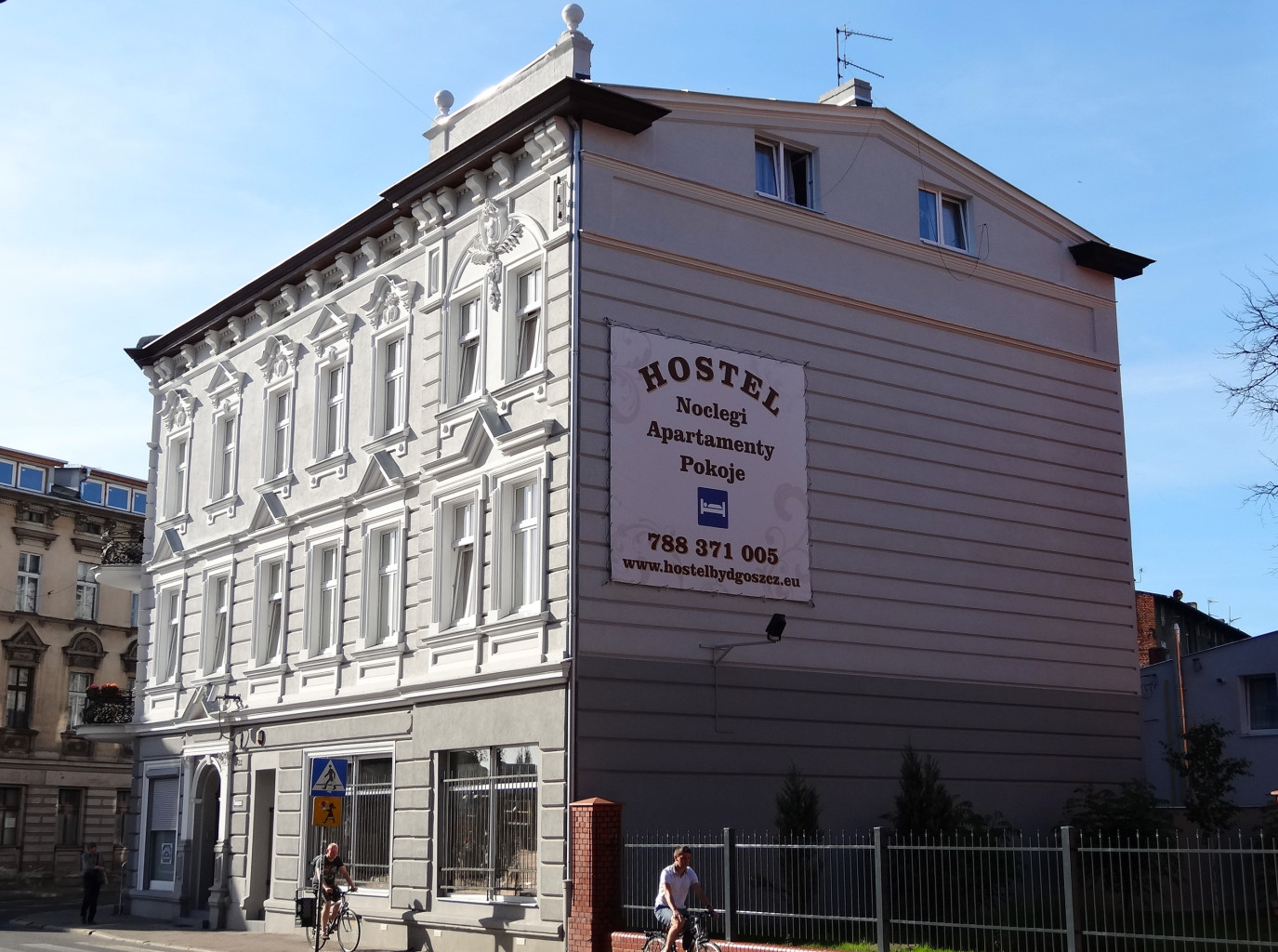
Facade on Świętojańska street

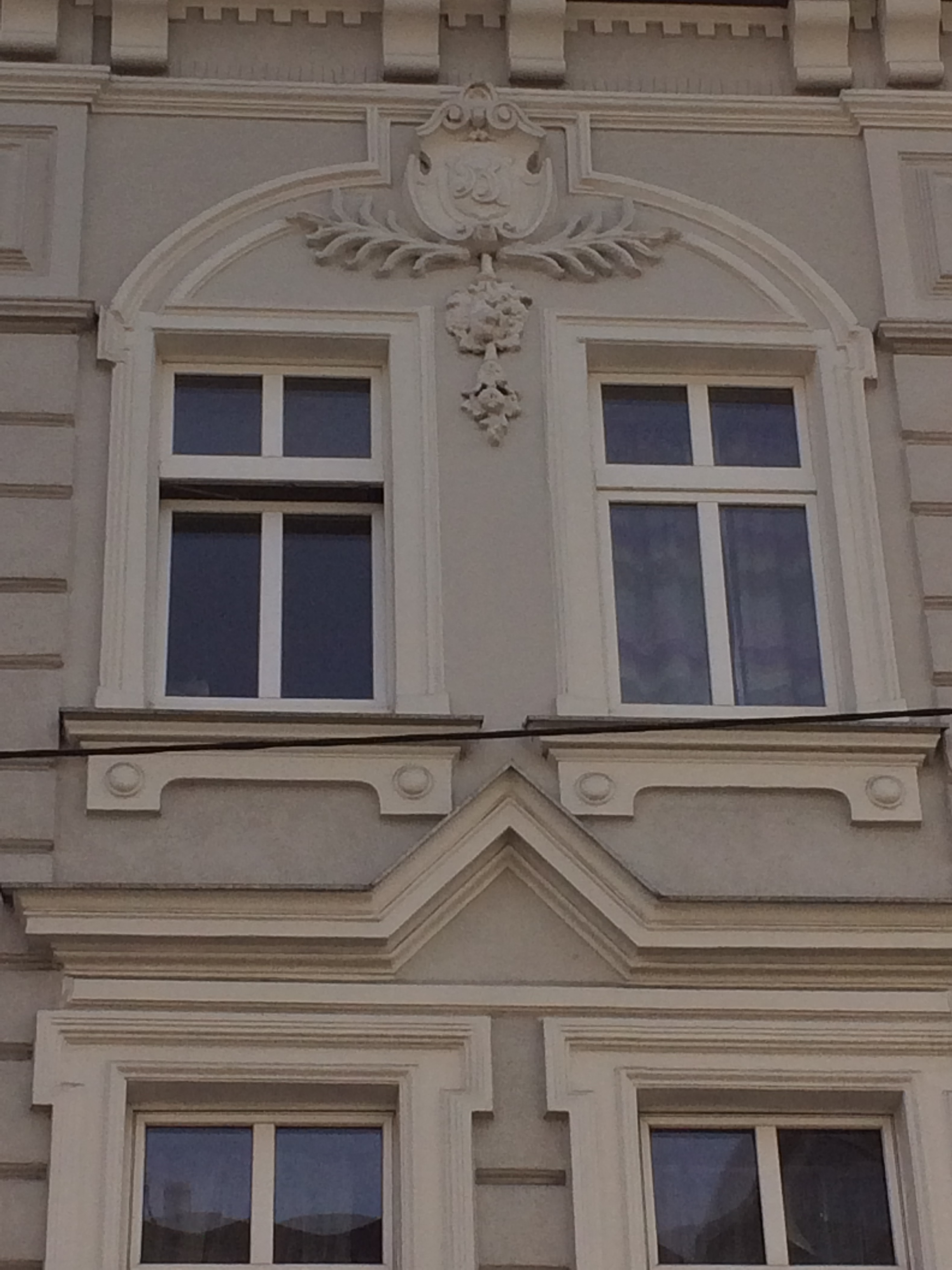
Motif detail

== See also ==
- Bydgoszcz
- Nicolaus Copernicus University Ludwik Rydygier Collegium Medicum in Bydgoszcz
- Bydgoszcz Architects (1850–1970s)

== Bibliography ==
- (in Polish) Umiński, Janusz (1996). Bydgoszcz. Przewodnik. Bydgoszcz: Regionalny Oddział PTTK "Szlak Brdy".
