= List of Residences in Pill Hill Historic District, Rochester, Minnesota =

This is a list of the residences in the Pill Hill Residential Historic District in Rochester, Minnesota. It is intended to be a complete list of the properties in the district, which is on the National Register of Historic Places in Olmsted County, Minnesota, and also lists some of the significant architectural and historical features in the district. The district was listed on National Register on November 29, 1990.

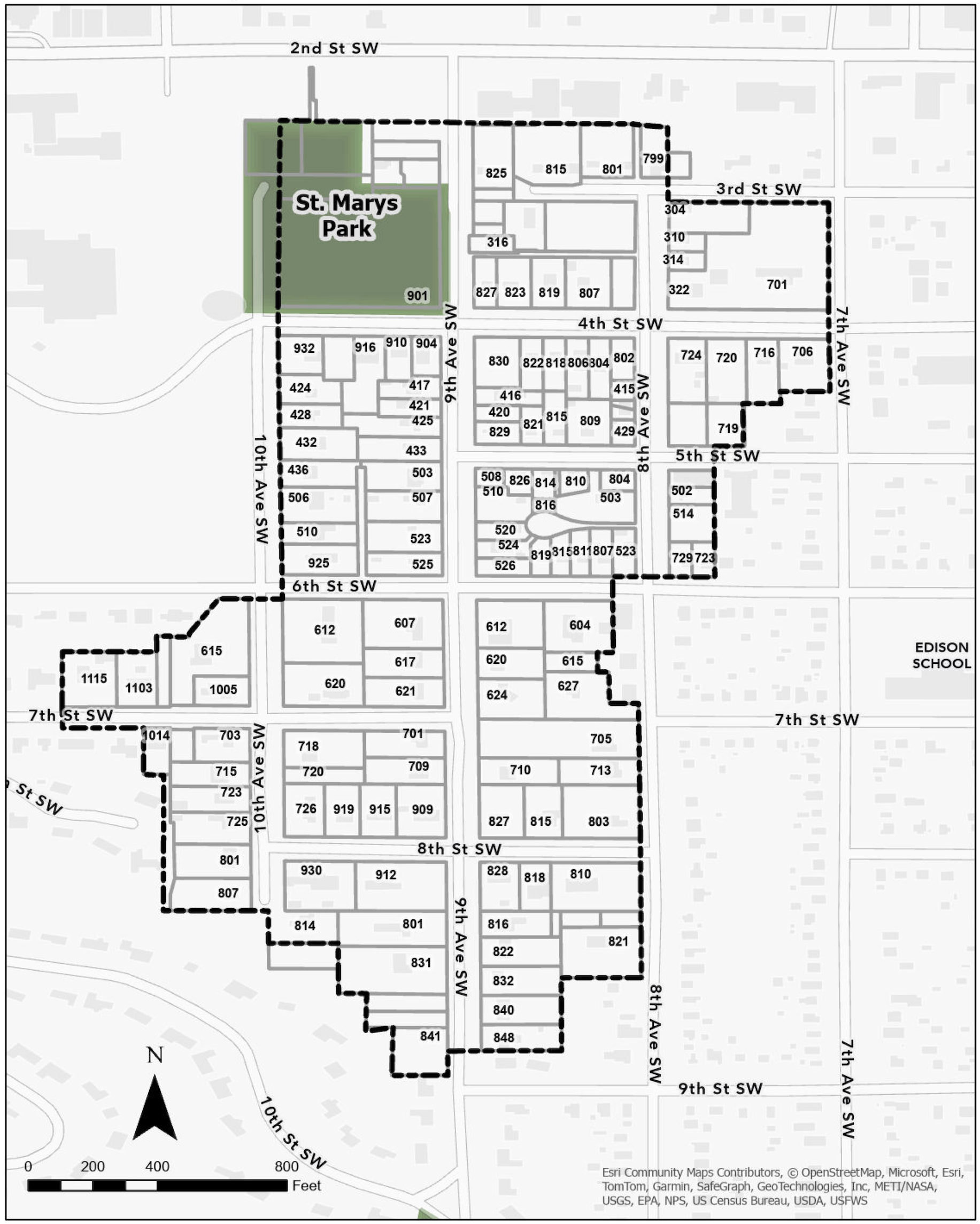
Map of Pill Hill per City of Rochester

== List of Residences ==
Address	Image	Name of Residence	Architect/Builder	Date Constructed	Architectural Style	Selected Character-Defining Architectural Features	Historic Owners, Residents, and Significance
799 3rd St SW		Mrs. Maud Mellish House	Ellerbe	1923; damaged by fire 1986 and repaired with rear addition	Prairie	Low-pitched roof with broad eaves; chimney detail; horizontal banding between 1st and 2nd floors; tall, horizontally grouped windows.	Maud Mellish Wilson was an important figure in the history of the Mayo Clinic. She married renown Mayo Clinic pathologist Louis B. Wilson in the 19020s and they moved to Walnut Hill.
801 3rd St SW		Dr. John E. Crewe House	Ellerbe	1915	Craftsman	Symmetrical façade with triple sets of windows on 1st and 2nd floors; horizontal banding; heavily bracketed front entry awning.	Dr. John E. Crewe had been the medical director at the Kahler Hotel and Harwood Hospital. Not employed at Mayo Clinic, he was known for the "Milk Cure," studying milk's effects on health and nutrition.
815 3rd St SW		Dr. William F. Braasch House	Ellerbe, architect; Garfield Schwartz, contractor	1915	Tudor Revival	Distinctive gables and roofline; 3 over 1 double hung windows; brick planters on 1F windows; brackets. The garage, to the side, complements the main House.	Dr. William F. Braasch founded and became head of the Mayo Clinic's Urology Section in 1914. He was an early pioneer of transurethral prostatic resection and developed the median bar excisor in 1918. He married Nellie Stinchfield in 1908, the daughter of Augustus Stinchfield, one of the co-founders of the Mayo Clinic.
820 3rd St SW		Dr. William C. MacCarty House	Harold H. Crawford (remodel 1945)	1915 (ca.)	Colonial Revival	Wings to either side of the main façade; deep setback; shutters framing the multi-pane windows.	Dr. William C. MacCarty became head of the Surgical Pathology Section of the Mayo Clinic in 1909. He was a founding member of the American Society for Clinical Pathology in 1922 and a past president of the ASCP.
825 3rd St SW				1955			
701 4th St SW		Dr. and Mrs. William J. Mayo House	Ellerbe and Associates	1916-1918	Elizabethan Revival	Nearly every element of the house is notable, from the large central tower to the distinctive stonework to the elegant fenestration.	William J. Mayo was one of the seven co-founders of the Mayo Clinic. In 1938, Dr. and Mrs. Mayo donated the home to Mayo Clinic as a meeting place “for the good of mankind.” Known since as the Mayo Foundation House, the home is reserved for Mayo Clinic meetings and events, and not open to the public.
701 4th St SW		Dr. William J. Mayo Carriage House	Ellerbe	1916	Craftsman	Front long shed dormer, banks of windows, arched stone gate. Back: arched 1F garage door and windows, crenellated roof, tall chimney.	The carriage house has an upper floor that was used as servant's quarters. Tunnels from the basement led to both Damon House and the main House, allowing easy servant access.
706 4th St SW		Dr. Leonard G. Rowntree House	Ellerbe (original); Edwin Lundie (remodel)	1922; remodeled 1932	Colonial Revival	Pent roof divides first floor stonework and 2nd floor wood shingles. Symmetrical design centers prominent front entry with sidelight door. 6 over 6 double-hung windows with shutters.	Dr. Leonard G. Rowntree became section head in the Mayo Clinic's Division of Medicine in 1920, where he was credited with founding the clinic's research tradition.
716 4th St SW		Victor A. Qvale House	Horace Cook, contractor	1895	Queen Anne	Roofline and side gables demonstrate original elevations. Very well-maintained. This is a very early home for the area.	Victor A. Qvale was a Rochester druggist. This house is one of only three surviving houses in Pill Hill that were built in the 1800s, and is the only example of the Queen Anne architectural style in Pill Hill.
720 4th St SW		George J. Allen House	Clausson, builder	1913-14	Craftsman	Triple-window grouping and original fenestration; horizontal banding; central roof gable; distinctive detailing on front entry.	George J. Allen was a Rochester attorney who also served as City Attorney.
724 4th St SW		Dr. Emil H. Beckman House	Ellerbe, architect; Garfield Schwartz, contractor	1914	Tudor Revival	Excellent Tudor detailing on the front gables; 6 over 1 double hung windows with defined trim and planter box; brick 1stfloor with stucco 2nd floor.	Dr. Emil H. Beckman was a prominent surgeon at St. Mary's Hospital at Mayo Clinic starting in 1911. With Dr. Charles Mayo, he was known for early advances in surgery. He died unexpectedly in 1916. The second owner, Dr. James C. Masson, became section head in the Mayo Clinic's Division of Surgery in 1915. Dr. Masson's daughter wrote a popular book on her life growing up in this House.
802 4th St SW		Paul C. Fuller House		1907	Colonial Revival	Stone foundation (rear façade); Colonial Revival symmetry; central 3F gable.	Paul C. Fuller was a Rochester druggist. The three shields logo used by Mayo Clinic was pitched by Sonja Dawson, an owner of this house, while hosting an event there in the 1970s.
804 4th St SW				1965	Split-level		
806 4th St SW		George Weber House		1914	Craftsman Bungalow	Brick balustrade and detailing on columns on the open front porch; rafter tails; triple sets of windows on both 1st and 2nd floors; some work on porch fascia and shingle repair will only improve the condition/integrity.	George Weber co-founded Weber-Judd Drug in 1885.
807 4th St SW		J.T. Collin House		1910 (ca.)	Vernacular brick with Colonial Revival influences	Colonial Revival pediment entry; brick detailing at windows and at entry; multi-colored brick adds visual interest in the veneer.	J.T. Collin was a Rochester insurance agent who may have rented a room to various doctors.
818 4th St SW		Fred. H. Russell House		1922	Craftsman	2nd floor window pairings; deep soffits; multi-color brick porch foundation.	Fred H. Russell was the former president of the First National Bank in Eyota, MN. The second owner, Dr. Henry (Hank) L. Williams, was an otolaryngologist (ENT) at Mayo Clinic, served as department chair (1951–1958), and was of the first to use antihistamines in the treatment of rhinitis. Lou Gehrig was a visitor at this property.
819 4th St SW		Dr. U.S. Couseller House		1918 (ca.)	Craftsman	Open brick front porch; simplified columns; triple sets of central picture windows symmetrically framed by 6 over 1 double hung windows on both the 1st and 2nd floors.	
822 4th St SW		Dr. Arthur H. Sanford House (1 of 2)		1903 (ca.)	Foursquare	Front porch stonework and columns; 1F picture windows with leaded glass; 2F dentils; overall scale and symmetry.	Dr. Arthur H. Sanford was a bacteriologist in the Mayo Clinic and became director of the clinical laboratories in 1911. Along with Dr. Charles Sheard, he developed the Sheard-Sanford photelometer, the first method known to measure the blood's hemoglobin. Past president of the American Society for Clinical Pathology.
823 4th St SW		Dr. Dorr F. Hallenbeck House	Hoffman & Mosse, architects	1915	Colonial Revival	Front entrance with sidelights and double-columned pediment; 1F windows with 6 over 1 double hungs flanked by 4 over 1 side windows (repeated in center window on 2F); window pairs 2F; prominent soffits.	Dr. Dorr F. Hallenbeck became section head in Medicine at the Mayo Clinic in 1913. His son, Dr. George Hallenbeck, performed Mayo Clinic's first solid organ transplant (kidney, 1963) and removed President Lyndon B. Johnson's gallbladder (1965).
827 4th St SW		Presburry W. Moore House		1903	Brick Vernacular Ell cottage	Greek revival returns on front gable.	Presburry W. Moore worked as a Mayo Clinic accountant. In 1913 Mayo surgeon Dr. Emil H. Beckman also lived here.
830 4th St SW		Dr. Louis B. Wilson House	Ellerbe (remodel)	1909; remodels in 1917 and 1946	Georgian Revival	Front door with leaded glass; front porch columns; prominent rafter tails.	Dr. Louis B. Wilson came to the Mayo Clinic in 1905 as chief pathologist and director of laboratories. He is known for developing the frozen section technique (1905) still in use today. Mayo Clinic's first animal lab for experimental surgery was equipped in a barn on this property in 1908 (the barn is since demolished). Dr. Wilson married Maud Mellish in the 1920s and they moved to Walnut Hill.
904 4th St SW				1956	Ranch		
910 4th St SW				1954	Ranch		
916 4th St SW		Mr. G. Slade Schuster House	Ellerbe	1950	Ranch		G. Slade Schuster was an administrator at the Mayo Clinic and also a banker. The house was designed by an Ellerbe intern who was an alumnus of the Frank Lloyd Wright Taliesen Fellowship, so the property exhibits many of Wright's trademarks.
932 4th St SW		Dr. Harry H. Bowing House		1930 (ca.)	Spanish Colonial Revival	Stone portal entry with columns and pilasters; red clay tile, multiple-gabled roof; decorative arched chimneys; arched 1F fenestration; 2F banks of windows with shutters.	Dr. Harry H. Bowing was head of the Mayo Clinic's Radium Therapy (Radiation Oncology) Section, and was the medical director of the Curie Hospital in downtown Rochester, a hospital for Mayo Clinic patients needing X-ray or radium treatments. He sent Marie Curie radium ampules for her work in the 1920s.
719 5th St SW		Robert C. Drips House	Harold H. Crawford	1927	Tudor Revival	Limestone and brick retaining walls; prominent arched front entry; distinctive window trim that matches Tudor detailing; brick banding; red tile roof; matching garage.	R.C. Drips Grocery Company was founded in 1907 after Drips moved to Rochester from Wisconsin. In 1913, his two sons joined their father in the wholesale grocery. It was family run through 1964.
804 5th St SW			Harold H. Crawford	1958	Colonial Revival		
809 5th St SW		Dr. Alexander B. Moore House		1920 (ca.)	Vernacular Craftsman Ell	Craftsman detailing at front entrance; deep soffits; original 3 over 1 double hung windows.	D. Alexander B. Moore became an associate in the Mayo Clinic's Roentgenology Section in 1910 and contributed significantly to the department's early development. Moore became the section head in Radiology in 1926 and oversaw the department's transition into the Plummer Building in 1928.
810 5th St SW				1959	Ranch		
814 5 St SW				1918	Colonial Revival	Central door with sidelights.	
815 5th St SW		Dr. Walter C. Alvarez House		1921-1927	Craftsman	Original 1F and 2F windows; deep bracketing; operational shutters.	Dr. Walter C. Alvarez joined the Mayo Clinic in 1926 and retired in 1950. His son, Dr. Luis Walter Alvarez, won the Nobel Prize in Physics in 1968, was a key contributor to the Manhattan Project, and developed the Alvarez hypothesis of dinosaur extinction with his son, geologist Dr. Walter Alvarez.
816 5th St SW				1950 (ca.)	Vernacular		
821 5th St SW				1909 (ca.)	Bungalow	2F paired double hung windows; original storms; 2F shed gable.	
826 5th St SW		originally the Dr. J.R. Learmonth House; now demolished		1918, original demolished; new construction in 2020s	Modern vernacular (new construction)		One of the few lost homes since the National Register listing was achieved.
829 5th St SW		Charles Dabelstein		1922 (ca.)	Craftsman with Colonial Revival entrance	Pedimented front entrance; 6 over 1 double hung windows (paired on the right side); board and batten siding on the 1F with shingles on the 2nd; shutters; rafter tails.	Charles Dabelstein was a banker at Olmsted County Savings.
723 6th St SW				1925	Foursquare		
729 6th St SW				1928	Vernacular		
807 6th St SW				1916	Vernacular		
811 6th St SW				1916	Foursquare		
815 6th St SW				1910	Vernacular		
819 6th St SW				1918	Vernacular		
925 6th St SW		Dr. George B. Eusterman House	Harold H. Crawford	1923; remodel 2025 added extra garage stalls	Spanish Colonial Revival	Brick arches above 1F multi pane windows and sills below 2F windows; triple gables; very tall chimney; prominent entry with deep roof and brick pediments approached by side drive.	Dr. George B. Eustermann joined the Mayo Clinic 1919 and was Mayo's first doctor to demonstrate the detection of cancer by use of X-ray. He served as Division Head in Medicine in 1919. President Franklin Delano Roosevelt was a guest at this property.
1005 7th St SW				1954	Colonial Revival		
1014 7th St SW		Thaddeus L. Szlapka House / Dr. Bert E. Hempstead House	Harold H. Crawford	1920	Colonial Revival	Prominent entry with arch above; symmetrical with one-story wings to each side; triple dormers.	Dr. Bert E. Hempstead joined Mayo Clinic's Section of Otolaryngology and Rhinology in 1921. A later resident, Dr. Hugh Butt, was head of the department of gastroenterology and internal medicine at Mayo Clinic from 1967 to 1974. Dr. Butt became good friends with Ernest Hemingway during Hemingway's period of care at Mayo Clinic. Hemingway frequented this property, including having Christmas dinner here in 1960.
1103 7th St SW				1968	Ranch, two-story		
1104 7th St SW		Dr. Byrl R. Kirklin House	Harold H. Crawford; Garfield Schwartz, contractor	1927	Spanish Colonial Revival	Original windows with shutters; bracketed balcony; pair of tall, arched windows; exterior chimney; arched pediment over door; red clay tile roof;	Dr. Byrl R. Kirklin became Mayo Clinic's second Director of Radiology, serving as its chair from 1930 to 1953. He was a pioneer in cholecystography (imaging of the gallbladder) and served as secretary-treasurer of the American Board of Radiology from 1934 to 1957. His son, pioneering cardiac surgeon John Kirklin, grew up in this House. It is the only contributing property on the National Register not protected under the local landmark district by the City of Rochester.
1115 7th St SW		Elmer Danewick House		1917	Prairie	Bracketed and arched entry with red clay tiles; horizontal banding effect from 2F shingles and decorative band between 1F and 2F; red clay tile roof.	
803 8th St SW		Garfield Schwartz House (2 of 2)	Ellerbe	1928	Spanish Colonial Revival	Combination of stucco and stone surface with multicolored clay time roof; 6 over 6 double hung windows with functional shutters and brick detailing; iron balcony over front door; detailing on drainpipe.	Garfield Schwartz was a prominent general contractor responsible for constructing many of the Pill Hill Houses as well as Mayowood. In addition to building the majority of Pill Hill homes, Garfield Schwarz & Co. built every Mayo Clinic building from 1914 to 1948, including the iconic Plummer Building.
810 8th St SW		Dr. Verne C. Hunt House	Harold H. Crawford	1926	Tudor Revival	Prominent, detailed chimneys; multi pane windows with stone detailing; slightly inset main bay window and front door with arched surround.	Dr. Verne C. Hunt was appointed a Division Head in Surgery at the Mayo Clinic in 1919. The House was later owned by Dr. Fred W. Rankin, a surgeon who married Edith Mayo, Charles Mayo's oldest daughter.
815 8th St SW		Dr. Fredrick A. Willius House	Harold H. Crawford	1931	Tudor Revival	Tall, multipaned and diamond casement windows; recessed front door with arch above and a 2nd floor bay window above; roofline bracketing; massive stone chimney on front elevation.	Dr. Fredrick A. Willius joined the Mayo Clinic in 1920 and was a notable cardiologist. He founded the division of cardiology at Mayo and was chief until his retirement in 1945. The Willius Society, a current medical history society at Mayo Clinic, is named in his honor.
818 8th St SW			Harold H. Crawford (remodel 1930, demolished)	1885 (ca.) original demolished; current structure built in 2009	Chateau style (new construction)		The original house (now demolished) was previously the oldest house in Pill Hill.
827 8th St SW		Dr. William A. Plummer House	Ellerbe	1927	Colonial Revival	Multi paned windows, primarily 6 over 6 double hung but with some taller narrow accents; sunroom at base of sloped roof to the right; arch over main 2F windows; narrow triple dormers in 3F.	Dr. William Plummer came to the Mayo Clinic in 1910 following his brother, Dr. Henry Plummer.
828 8th St SW		Mr. John Schwartz House / Dr. W.B. Start House / Dr. W.M. Craig House	Ellerbe, architect; Garfield Schwartz, builder	1924	Tudor Revival	Strong slope to the front façade roof; brick detailing around windows and to the left side; triple banks of multi pane windows.	The house was originally built under the name of the contractor, Garfield Schwartz, then Dr. W.B. Start, then Dr. Winchell M. Craig, a pioneering neurosurgeon at the Mayo Clinic.
909 8th St SW		Dr. William L. Benedict House	Harold H. Crawford	1925	Tudor Revival	Impressive entryway with 2.5-story Tudor detailing to the right; otherwise generally 6 over 1 double hung windows; detailed exterior chimneys at each gable; varied brickwork coursings; matching garage.	Dr. William L. Benedict became head of the Section on Ophthalmology at the Mayo Clinic in 1917.
912 8th St SW		Harry J. Harwick House	Ellerbe; later remodel (ca. 2021)	1922	Colonial Revival	Intricate front door pediment repeated in dormers; symmetrical double hung windows with deep sills; triple gables on the 3F; multiple chimneys.	Harry J. Harwick was the Mayo Clinic's first business manager, hired to establish its systems. He was one of the incorporators of the Mayo Foundation as well as the Kahler Corporation. Mayo Clinic's Harwick Building is named in his honor.
915 8th St SW				1952	Split-level, two-story		
919 8th St SW		M.C. Lawler House	Harold H. Crawford	1926	Craftsman	Sloped and bracketed roof to over arched top front door; porch wraps around corner; mostly 6 over 1 double hung windows but 8 pane casements in the corner; operable shutters; dentils over 1F main bank of windows; wood paneling at gables.	Martin C. Lawler opened the One-Price Clothing Store with Daniel Stern in the late 1800s. He later opened MC Lawler, a prominent men's clothing store.
930 8th St SW		Dr. John J. Pemberton House	Ellerbe	1922	Colonial Revival	Entry portico with Palladian window above; bracketing at roofline; chimney at each gable; detailed window trim.	Dr. John J. Pemberton was appointed attending surgeon and division head in surgery at the Mayo Clinic in 1918 and specialized in thyroid surgery. From 1942 to 1945 he was president of the Mayo Clinic staff.
304 8th Ave SW		Dr. H. Waltman Walters House	Ellerbe	1922	Colonial Revival	3F balcony with wood awning; long, sloped roof; 1F side sunroom with arched top, floor to ceiling windows.	Dr. H. Waltman Walters was appointed first assistant in one of the sections on Surgery at the Mayo Clinic in 1922 and was head of surgery from 1924 to 1960. He married Phoebe Mayo in 1921, the youngest daughter of Dr. Will Mayo and Hattie Damon Mayo.
310 8th Ave SW		E.M. Pomroy House	Ellerbe	1916	Craftsman	Arched front door with sidelights; open screened arches to the porch; 2F shed dormer; detailing on drainpipe.	E. M. Pomroy was Dr. William J. Mayo's steward.
314 8th Ave SW		F.O. Dahle House	Ellerbe	1916	Craftsman	Arched front door with sidelights; open screened arches to the porch; 2F shed dormer; detailing on drainpipe.	F.O. Dahle was Dr. William J. Mayo's chauffeur. He was known for possessing one of the first home movie cameras and used color film (rare at the time) to record the Mayo family's journeys.
322 8th Ave SW		Mrs. Hattie Damon Mayo House / "Damon House" / "Hattie's House"	Ellerbe	1937	Elizabethan Revival	The entrance is especially distinct, with its curved copper roof and glass block, Moderne sidelights. Also deep windows with stonework; slate roof with single dormer; unusual garage.	Hattie Damon Mayo married Willam J. Mayo in 1884. Their various homes included this home ("Damon House"), the Balfour House, and the adjacent Mayo Foundation House. They moved into this smaller house later in 1937, when Dr. Mayo started using a wheelchair and needed a smaller space. After Dr. Will died, the house became known as "Hattie's House."
415 8th Ave SW				1941	Saltbox Cottage		
419-421 8th Ave SW		Thomas S. Parkin Duplex	Harold H. Crawford	1919	Colonial Revival	Intersecting gambrel roofs from front and side elevation; 6 over 6 multi pane windows; double front dormer. One of the few duplexes in the area.	
429 8th Ave SW		William W. Churchill House	Harold H. Crawford	1916	Prairie	Open brick porch with brackets; 6 over 1 double hung windows; brick banding at floor levels of each story and above 1F windows; 2F Tudor detailing; brick and stucco front wall.	William W. Churchill was originally a bookkeeper at, then president of, the First Bank of Rochester.
502 8th Ave SW				1916	Colonial Revival	Shallow pediment around the front door; 2F shed gable.	
503 8th Ave SW		Dr. Walter D. Shelden House		1910	Neoclassical	Double front Doric columns; 2F balcony spanning the full length between columns; circular and oval windows.	Dr. Walter D. Shelden became Mayo Clinic's first neurologist in 1913. He became head of the Neurology Section and held the post through 1930.
514 8th Ave SW		Harold H. Crawford House	Harold H. Crawford	1926	Tudor Revival	Inset entrance with wood and brick detailing; complex roofline; stone, brick, and stucco surfaces; grouped multi-pane casement windows (mainly 6-pane).	Harold H. Crawford was one of Rochester's most prominent architects. He was known for making elaborately detailed drafts of properties without the assistance of a draftsman, and for his collaborations with contractor Garfield Schwartz. Many of his original hand-drawn architectural drafts are available for viewing at the History Center of Olmsted County.
523 8th Ave SW				1939	Colonial Revival	Shutters with pine tree cut-outs; teardrop detailing between 1F and 2F.	
615 8th Ave SW		Dr. Norman M. Keith House	Harold H. Crawford	1922	Colonial Revival	Multi-pane windows; side addition with roof deck and exterior chimney.	Dr. Norman M. Keith was a division head in Medicine at Mayo Clinic in 1923. His son, Sandy Keith, a politician, state senator, and Chief Justice of the Minnesota Supreme Court, grew up in the home.
627 8th Ave SW		Edward C. Kendall House	Harold H. Crawford	1919	Colonial Revival	Central front entrance with Doric pilasters, sidelights, and fanlight; strong front symmetry.	Edward C. Kendall became head of the section on biochemistry at the Mayo Foundation in 1914. He was awarded the Nobel Prize in Physiology or Medicine in 1950 for the discovery of Cortisone while working at Mayo.
705 8th Ave SW		Frank P. Fryer House / Dr. Halbert Dunn House	Harold H. Crawford (remodel 1929); Walsh Bishop Associates (addition 1985)	1909; remodel 1929; addition 1985	Vernacular	Brick vestibule and central chimney.	Frank P. Fryer was a barber. Dr. Halbert Dunn was a doctor at Mayo Clinic and purchased the house in 1929. The owner who commissioned the addition in 1985 was Dr. William E. Mayberry, who served as Mayo Clinic's CEO from 1976 to 1987.
713 8th Ave SW				1908	Vernacular	Garage/carriage house likely original.	
821 8th Ave SW		Dr. Albert C. Broders House (2 of 2)	Harold H. Crawford; Garfield Schwartz, contractor	1936	Colonial Revival	Multi-pane windows with functional shutters; long driveway approach and beautiful site.	Dr. Albert C. Broders was the director of surgical pathology at the Colonial and Kahler Hospitals in 1922. He developed the morphologic grading system for cancer that is still used today.
316 9th Ave SW				1895	Vernacular	Stone wall and base; massive stone and brick chimney.	One of only three surviving houses in Pill Hill that were built in the 1800s.
416 9th Ave SW		F.J. O'Brien House		1935	Colonial Revival	4 over 4 double hung windows with shutters; arched pediment over door; strong symmetry.	F.J. O'Brien was a Rochester attorney.
417 9th Ave SW		Dr. Frederick Le Roy Smith House		1930 (ca.)	Prairie	Banks of 6 over 1 windows with original storms and brick detailing; strong banding and 2F corner detailing; deep eaves; arched top door with brick detailing.	Dr. Frederick Le Roy Smith became an associate in the Section on Postoperative Treatment at the Mayo Clinic in 1917.
420 9th Ave SW		Dr. Axel A. Thorson House	Harold H. Crawford	1929	Picturesque with Tudor influence	Quoined entrance; 1F 6 over 1 windows; central chimney with dashing.	
421 9th Ave SW		A.M. Bach House	Harold H. Crawford	1936	Tudor Revival	Multipaned casement windows; 1F and 2F bay windows; 2F bracketing; sloped roof over front door; detailed chimney.	
425 9th Ave SW		Dr. G.T. Joyce House	Harold H. Crawford	1920	Craftsman	Roof brackets; brick window trim.	
433 9th Ave SW		Dr. Monte C. Piper House	Harold H. Crawford	1927	Tudor Revival	6 over 6 double hung windows with subtly arched tops and brick detailing. Front door flanked by stone quoins and detailing above; Tudor accent above the front door on the 2F; prominent and highly detailed chimney.	Dr. Monte C. Piper became an associate in the Division of Medicine at the Mayo Clinic in 1921.
503 9th Ave SW		Dr. Archibald H. Logan House	Ellerbe, architect; Garfield Schwartz, builder.	1915	Prairie	Banks of tall 3 over 1 windows; strong horizontal banding between 1F and 2F; red clay time roof; subtle tapering on exterior walls; offset entry.	Dr. Archibald H. Logan was appointed Division Head in Medicine at the Mayo Clinic in 1911.
507 9th Ave SW		Dr. Porter P. Vinson House		1918, 1928 addition	Craftsman	Unusual "Y" window detailing with heavy sills; brick front steps; peak over front door; some recessed half timbering to left side.	Dr. Porter P. Vinson was appointed first assistant in a Section on Medicine at the Mayo Clinic in 1921. He is known, in collaboration with Dr. Henry Plummer, for the eponymous Plummer-Vinson syndrome.
508 9th Ave SW		Dr. Arlie R. Barnes House	Ellerbe; Edwin Lundie (1928 remodel)	1921 (ca.); 1928 remodel	Colonial Revival	Prominent pedimented entry with arched fan over door; original fenestration with 6 over 1 double hung windows; shutters with heart cut-outs as a sly comment on the doctor's specialty; long front shed dormer.	Dr. Arlie R. Barnes entered the Mayo Foundation in 1920 as a fellow in Medicine and was an early cardiologist. He was the president of the American Heart Association from 1947 to 1948.
510 9th Ave SW		Dr. Lloyd H. Ziegler House		1927	Tudor Revival	Central main chimney with brick top; narrow central 3F window; stone around an arched top door.	Dr. Lloyd H. Ziegler trained at Mayo Clinic in 1924 and worked on staff at Mayo in Neurology from 1926 to 1930. He was a founding member of the American Board of Psychiatry and Neurology.
520 9th Ave SW				1952			
523 9th Ave SW		Dr. Harold I. Lillie House	Ellerbe; remodeled in 1950	1922	Tudor Revival	Banks of windows; arched top front door.	Dr. Harold I. Lillie was chair of Otolaryngology and Rhinology at Mayo Clinic from 1917 to 1951. He oversaw the early formation of the department and its residency program.
524 9th Ave SW		Dr. James P. Arneill House	Harold H. Crawford	1929	Storybook	Brickwork around front door; banks of 4 over 4 original windows, including 2F bay; storybook influence of curved roof over door and wave-cut wood at center peak; prominent brick and stone central chimney.	Dr. Arneill lived here only a short time, selling the house to Dr. Howard K. Gray, a Mayo Clinic surgeon and son of Carl Raymond Gray. Dr. Gray removed a gastric ulcer from James Roosevelt, son of Franklin D. Roosevelt, in 1938 and it is said that James recovered from surgery in this house.
525 9th Ave SW		Dr. Henry W. Meyerding House		1907	Colonial Revival	Eyebrow window in roof; pedimented door with arched top; original 6 over 6 double hung windows; raised on slight hill so stone wall is an important factor.	Dr. Henry W. Meyerding was an orthopedic surgeon at Mayo Clinic. He became famous in 1944 for the separation of a parasitic twin in the "Two Boys with One Head," Ernie and Len DeFort. He married Lura Stinchfield in 1912, the daughter of Augustus Stinchfield, one of the co-founders of the Mayo Clinic.
526 9th Ave SW		Dr. Louis T. Austin House	Harold H. Crawford	1926	French Eclectic	Stone corner quoins; prominent stone and brick central chimney; side brick arch.	Dr. Louis T. Austin became an associate in Dental Surgery at the Mayo Clinic in 1919 and was one of the first dentists there.
604 9th Ave SW		Dr. Henry F. Helmholz House	Scott & Mayer, architects; Heffron & Fitzgerald, builders	1922	Tudor Revival	Complex roofline; sleeping porch wing; sandstone window ornamentation; irregular stone at base; arched top window at peak; some diamond patterned windows.	Dr. Henry F. Helmholz became head of pediatrics at the Mayo Clinic in 1921. He was the ninth president of the American Academy of Pediatrics.
607 9th Ave SW		Clarence W. Blakely House		1928; 1976 addition	Spanish Colonial Revival	1F windows with detailed arches above; main door has arched fanlight above; balcony over door; red clay tile roof with deep soffits.	Clarence W. Blakely and his father Amherst Blakely were important figures in the newspaper business in Rochester in the 1890s. They merged their Record and Union with the Rochester Post in 1899 to form the Post and Record, which in 1925 was merged with the Rochester Daily to become the Rochester Post Bulletin.
612 9th Ave SW				1954			
617 9th Ave SW		Dr. Edward C. Rosenow House	Harold H. Crawford in collaboration with Frederick M. Mann; later remodels also Crawford	1919, remodel 1928 (Crawford), remodel ca. 1940s to replace Prairie features with Georgian Revival features (also Crawford).	Georgian Revival, although originally Prairie prior to remodel	Horizontal band between 1F and 2F. Brick trim around windows. Deep eaves. Side bay window.	Dr. Edward C. Rosenow became head of the Division of Experimental Bacteriology at the Mayo Foundation in 1915. He invented a mixed polyvalent flu serum that served as the basis for modern vaccines, for which he was nominated for the Nobel Prize in Physiology or Medicine in 1938 and 1948. Dr. John I. Emmett, Mayo Clinic urologist, commissioned the 1940s renovation from Harold Crawford.
620 9th Ave SW		Dr. Samuel F. Haines House	Harold H. Crawford	1930	Colonial Revival	Main entrance with sidelights and arched portico, flanked by small multi pane windows; gabled slate roof.	Dr. Samuel F. Haines worked with Dr. Henry Plummer in endocrinology and thyroid disease at Mayo Clinic. In 1956, he received a special certificate from the American Goiter Association for "long and meritorious service.''
621 9th Ave SW		Mr. Garfield S. Schwartz House / Dr. Stuart W. Harrington House	Ellerbe	1921	Tudor Revival	Multiple half-timbered gables; diamond patterned casements.	Garfield Schwartz lived in the house for just one year before selling it to Dr. Harrington, who was appointed section head on General Surgery at the Mayo Clinic in 1920.
624 9th Ave SW		Dr. H. Milton Conner House	Harold H. Crawford; later addition (circa 2020)	1929	Tudor Revival	Projecting brick and stone entry with small windows; elaborate limestone chimney; multi pane windows with bay at left.	Dr. Harry Milton Conner served in the departments of both Surgical Pathology (1918) and Medicine (1920) at the Mayo Clinic.
701 9th Ave SW		Dr. Mandred W. Comfort House		1934	Colonial Revival	Wood shingle roof (at time of survey, now replaced with asphalt); prominent front door with central lantern; large shutters; dentils at roofline.	Dr. Mandred W. Comfort Served was a Mayo Clinic gastroenterologist who served as president of the American Gastroenterological Association in 1957.
709 9th Ave SW		Dr. Albert.M. Snell House	Edwin Lundie	1934 (ca.)	Colonial Revival	L-plan; triangle pediment over front door.	Dr. Albert M. Snell joined Mayo Clinic in 1924 and served as the president of the Central Society for Clinical Research in 1932. Dr. Snell was a Medical Director at the Mayo Clinic in the 1940s.
710 9th Ave SW		Dr. Frederick P. Moersch House	Harold H. Crawford	1932	Tudor Revival	Prominent stone and brick front chimney; stone detailing around door; curved bay window on left.	Dr. Frederich P. Moersch was a neurologist at the Mayo Clinic starting in 1921, and was the first doctor to describe stiff-person syndrome along with Dr. Henry Woltman.
801 9th Ave SW		Dr. Melvin S. Henderson House	Ellerbe	1929	Tudor Revival	Curved stone wall; polygonal bay on left side; diamond patterned windows.	Dr. Melvin S. Henderson joined the Mayo Clinic and founded its department of orthopedic surgery. He became the first president of the American Board of Orthopedic Surgeons when it was established at the Kahler Hotel.
816 9th Ave SW		Albert J. Lobb	Harold H. Crawford	1928	Colonial Revival	Double story front porch running the whole width of the house; elaborate Corinthian columns on porch and flanking front door.	Albert J. Lobb was a lecturer and assistant professor in political science and law at the University of Minnesota (1916–1920) and comptroller and secretary of the Board of Regents at UMN until entering the Mayo Clinic in 1925 as an associate in General Administration.
822 9th Ave SW		Dr. Gordon B. New	Ellerbe	1927; 1945 remodel	Colonial Revival	Main door with sidelights; window above on 2F with metalwork and arched fan above. Decorative panel under 1F windows.	Dr. Gordon B. New came to the Mayo Clinic in 1910 as an ENT doctor. He became an early pioneer of plastic surgery, due to his interest in helping his patients regain features after surgery.
831 9th Ave SW		Dr. Alfred W. Adson House	Harold H. Crawford, architect; Garfield Schwarz, builder.	1929	Tudor Revival	Stone quoin ornamentation at entrance; 2F bay above entrance; attached garage with arched door; half-timbering on both bricks and stucco; staggered multipaned windows at ell; exterior stone and brick chimney	Dr. Alfred W. Adson founded and led the department of neurosurgery at Mayo Clinic, and is known for the ubiquitous Adson forceps used in surgeries worldwide. The property includes a local 1850s log cabin that was disassembled and built into a recreation room. Jack Dempsey, American heavyweight boxer, was a guest at this property and carved his initials on a wall inside. Adson's son, Dr. Martin Adson, was a surgeon and served as president of the Mayo staff in 1977. The second owner, Dr. Bruce Douglass, started Mayo's section on Occupational Health and established the MN Zoological Society while living here, which sponsored the development of the Minnesota Zoo.
832 9th Ave SW		Dr. John L. Crenshaw House	Ellerbe	1921	Colonial Revival	Central front door; bay window.	Dr. John L. Crenshaw joined the Mayo Clinic in 1910 as a urologist. His wife, Nell Crenshaw, served as a field nurse during WWI in one of the French hospitals established by the Mayo brothers.
840 9th Ave SW		Dr. Albert C. Broders House	Ellerbe	1919	Colonial Revival	Central front entry with paired windows above; small balcony over bay window on north side.	Dr. Albert C. Broders was the director of surgical pathology at the Colonial and Kahler Hospitals in 1922 for the Mayo Clinic. He developed the morphologic grading system for cancer that is still used today. After ten years at this house, he commissioned Harold Crawford to design a larger home on 8th Avenue SW.
841 9th Ave SW		Dr. Harry G. Wood House	John McG. Miller	1928	Tudor Revival	2F balcony over front door; diamond pattened windows flank front entrance.	Dr. Harry J. Wood was a doctor at the Mayo Clinic in the division of medicine.
848 9th Ave SW		Dr. Henry W. Woltman House	Ellerbe	1929	Colonial Revival	Bay window that matches roof over the side entrance; triple dormers.	Dr. Henry W. Woltman was a specialist in both Neurology and Psychiatry at Mayo Clinic starting in 1919. He was the first doctor to describe stiff-person syndrome along with Dr. Frederich P. Moersch.
424 10th Ave SW		G.O. Lohse House	Ellerbe	1937	Colonial Revival	Front door with sidelights; 6 over 6 double hung windows	Lohse was a partner in Pahlen and Lohse, funeral directors.
428 10th Ave SW				1941 (ca.)			
432 10th Ave SW		Dr. Arthur U. Desjardins House	Frederick M. Mann, architect	1929	French Eclectic	Dramatic slate roof; side entrance with door surrounded by stone; brick detailing around doors and windows (where visible)	Dr. Arthur U. Desjardins became section head of Radiation Therapy at the Mayo Clinic in 1920, where he worked until 1949. He was an authority on radiotherapy for Hodgkins disease.
436 10th Ave SW		Dr. Charles S. McVicar House	Harold H. Crawford	1926	Colonial Revival	Inset door with stone surround; octagonal window with stone detailing above; small single dormer; double chimney on right and single on left.	Dr. Charles S. McVicar was a gastroenterologist who joined Mayo Clinic in 1921 and served as section head. He died in 1929.
506 10th Ave SW		Dr. Arthur H. Sanford House (2 of 2)	Hoffman and Mosse, architects; remodel in 1928 by Harold H. Crawford	1914	Craftsman	Strong multi pane fenestration with prominent trim; detailed central 2F peak; prominent entry with brick pillars.	Dr. Arthur H. Sanford was a bacteriologist in the Mayo Clinic and became director of the clinical laboratories in 1911. Along with Dr. Charles Sheard, he developed the Sheard-Sanford photelometer, the first method known to measure the blood's hemoglobin. Past president of the American Society for Clinical Pathology.
510 10th Ave SW		Dr. Willis S. Lemon House "Twin Gables"	Harold H. Crawford	1919	Tudor Revival	Casement windows; arched entry door.	Dr. Willis S. Lemon established and lead the special thoracic section at Mayo Clinic in 1918.
612 10th Ave SW		Fred S. Haines House (1 of 2) / Dr. P. L. O'Leary House	Ellerbe (remodel 1930); Harold H. Crawford (carriage house)	1912; 1930 remodel	Georgian Revival	1F fenestration of picture windows with 5 multi pane transoms above and multi-pane sidelights; double central gables; double porch.	Fred S. Haines worked in real estate and was the president of the Rochester Telephone Co. Second owner was Dr. Paul A. O'Leary, an associate in Dermatology and Syphilology at the Mayo Clinic who commissioned the remodel. The only residence in Pill Hill to have designs represented by both Ellerbe and Crawford.
615 10th Ave SW		Mr. Cornelius M. Judd House / Margaret Alseth House	Ellerbe	1910	Prairie	Tall banks of casement windows; open patio/porch area; subtly arched front door with sidelights and arched roof above; decorative band separates 1F and 2F.	Cornelius M. Judd was president of the Weber-Judd Drug Company.
620 10th Ave SW		Dr. George E. Brown House	Harold H. Crawford (remodel 1919)	1910 (ca.)	Neoclassical	Long walk through stone arched gate to home; side entrance; leaded glass tops to larger windows; detailed entrance and porch; very deep eaves.	Dr. George E. Brown was appointed an associate in the Division of Medicine at the Mayo Clinic in 1922.
703 10th Ave SW		Dr. Walter M. Boothby House	Harold H. Crawford; Otto Winkle, builder	1930	Colonial Revival	Central entry with peaked roof; central chimney; 2F projects slightly.	Dr. Walter M. Boothby entered the Mayo Clinic in 1916 and lead its metabolism section. He contributed to multiple pioneering aviation medicine innovations used in WWII, including a high-altitude oxygen mask known as the BLB mask (for Boothby-Lovelace-Bulbulian) with William Randolph Lovelace II and Arthur H. Bulbulian.
715 10th Ave SW				1887 (ca.); 1930 addition	Vernacular	Original windows and bay.	The oldest surviving house in Pill Hill.
718 10th Ave SW		Dr. Howard R. Hartman House		1924 (ca.)	Craftsman	Sun porch; tapered columns.	Dr. Howard R. Hartman became an associate in the Division of Medicine at the Mayo Clinic in 1919.
720 10th Ave SW		Thomas S. Parkin House	Harold H. Crawford in collaboration with Frederick M. Mann	1916	Colonial Revival	Deep brackets and curve above inset door; 3F eyebrow windows.	Thomas S. Parkin owned a candy shop. The house was later owned by Dr. Louis A. Buie, who joined Mayo Clinic in 1919 in the division of medicine.
723 10th Ave SW		Fred Altona House		1915	Foursquare	Oriel window; 1F picture window with leaded glass.	
725 10th Ave SW		Jonathan R. Randall House	Clarence J. Brown, architect	1915	Colonial Revival	Triple eyebrow windows above shed dormer; low gambrel roof; functioning 1F shutters; rectangular side bay window.	Jonathan Randal was secretary-treasurer of the TJ Dansingburg Co, a building materials firm. Second owner was Dr. Hermon C. Bumpus, an associate in the Urology department at Mayo Clinic.
726 10th Ave SW		Dr. Harold C. Habein House		1934	Colonial Revival	Curved multi pane bay window; wood shingle sheathing; peaked pedimented entry door flanked by columns.	Dr. Harold C. Habein was the Mayo Clinic doctor who diagnosed Lou Gehrig with ALS (Lou Gehrig's Disease), a rare condition with which Dr. Habein was familiar because his own mother had recently died from the disease.
801 10th Ave SW		Dr. Herman G Bumpus House	Ellerbe	1938	Garrison Colonial	Modern features: wide porch, 2F jut out.	Dr. Herman G. Bumpus established the Section of Urology at Mayo Clinic in 1915. This house would have appeared extremely modern when it was built in the 1930s, and is considered a precursor to the homes more reminiscent of the 1960s and 1970s.
807 10th Ave SW		Dr. Claude F. Dixon House		1923	Colonial Revival	Recessed entry; side bay.	Dr. Claude F. Dixon joined Mayo Clinic in 1926 and was the senior surgeon at the Colonial Hospital. He is known for development of the anterior resection procedure for rectal cancer surgery. Dr. Dixon performed a cholecystectomy (gallbladder removal) on Helen Keller in 1937.
814 10th Ave SW		Dr. M.J. Anderson House		1921 (ca.)	Colonial Revival	Front whitewashed chimney flanked by a pair of multi pane windows.	Dr. M. J. Anderson entered as a fellow in 1925 and joined the staff of the Mayo Clinic in 1928. He married Alice Stinchfield in 1918, the daughter of Augustus Stinchfield, one of the co-founders of the Mayo Clinic.

== Non-Residential Structures ==
Address	Image	Name of Structure	Architect/Builder	Date Constructed	Historic Significance
901 4th St SW		St. Mary's Hill Park		1906	The park site also formerly included a second water tower, the "City Water Tower" constructed in 1887. This structure was listed on the National Register nomination, but has since been demolished. The St. Mary's Hill Park Water Tower still remains.
909 4th St SW		St. Mary's Hill Park Water Tower	LP Wolff, architect; Bland Engineering Co, builder.	1923-24	The need for water services in Pill Hill was re-affirmed in 1918, when "Willson's Castle" burned to the ground partially due to lack of getting enough water pressure to put the fire out.
