= Garfield Schwartz =

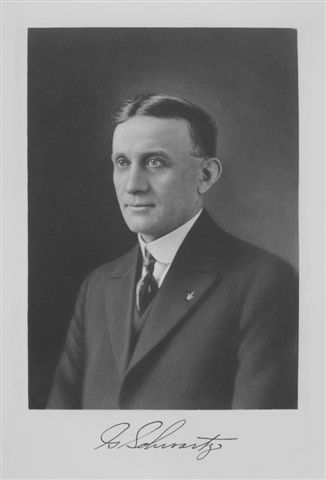
Garfield Schwartz, circa 1920s. Image courtesy Ken Allsen.

Garfield Schwartz (1882-1956) was the founder and president of the Garfield Schwartz & Co. Builders (est. 1909), which became the largest construction firm in Minnesota in the first half of the 20th century. His construction firm was especially active in Rochester, Minnesota, where it constructed every Mayo Clinic building from 1914-1948, including the iconic Plummer Building. G. Schwartz & Co. constructed over 500 buildings with over $30,000,000 in total business in southeastern Minnesota. The firm was also known for having built the majority of homes in the Pill Hill Residential Historic District in Rochester, a neighborhood now recognized on the National Register of Historic Places for its significant architecture. Schwartz & Co. constructed works by prominent architects Harold Crawford and Ellerbe and Associates in Pill Hill and throughout Rochester. Garfield Schwarz worked closely with prominent figures in the history of Rochester, including William J. Mayo, Charles H. Mayo, and John Kahler. He died in 1956 and is buried in Oakwood Cemetery.

== Notable works ==
- 1914 building, the original building of the Mayo Clinic (demolished)
- Plummer Building, now a National Historic Landmark
- Numerous Residences in the Pill Hill Residential Historic District, now on the National Register of Historic Places
- Mayowood Estate
- Mayo Civic Auditorium
- Rochester City Hall
- Conley–Maass Building
- Libby Canning Plant
- Kahler Hotel
- Zumbro Hotel
- Franklin Heating Station (Mayo Clinic)
- Northrop School
- Edison School
- Hawthorne School
- Lourdes High School (demolished 2025-2026)
