= Fredrick Arthur Willius =

American cardiologist

Fredrick Arthur Willius MD, FACP
- Born: November 24, 1888; Saint Paul, Minnesota, US
- Died: October 19, 1972 (aged 83); Rochester, Minnesota, US
- Education: University of Minnesota (BS), University of Minnesota Medical School (MD, MS in Medicine)
- Occupations: Cardiologist, professor
- Years active: 1915–1953
- Spouse: Stella Mae Popple (m. 1917)
- Medical career
- Field: Cardiology, History of medicine
- Institutions: Mayo Clinic
- Sub-specialties: Electrocardiography
- Research: Coronary heart disease, Angina, Senescence, Thrombosis
- Notable works: Cardiac Classics. A Collection of Classic Works on the Heart and Circulation, with Comprehensive Biographic Accounts of the Authors with Thomas E. Keys; A History of the Heart and the Circulation with Thomas J. Dry
- Awards: Rollin E. Cutts Prize in Surgery (1913)

Academic background
- Thesis: Experimental Diabetes and Pancreatic Transplantation (1914)
- Doctoral advisor: Henry Stanley Plummer

Signature
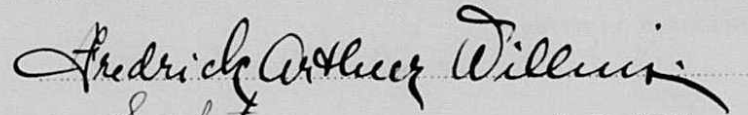

Dr. Fredrick Arthur Willius (November 24, 1888 – October 19, 1972) was an American cardiologist and medical historian. He earned both his Bachelor of Science and Doctor of Medicine degrees from the University of Minnesota before joining the Mayo Clinic in 1917. At Mayo, Willius collaborated with Henry Stanley Plummer, through whom he was introduced to the emerging field of electrocardiography. This area would become central to Willius’s professional contributions.

In 1923, Will and Charles Mayo appointed Willius as the head of the newly established Cardiology Department, a position he held until his retirement in 1945. During his tenure, he played a pivotal role in advancing the field of electrocardiography and contributed to several influential studies that significantly impacted cardiology and internal medicine. Notably, Willius and his colleagues were among the first to publish research establishing a definitive link between cigarette smoking and coronary artery disease, challenging prevailing scientific assumptions of the time.

Beyond his clinical work, Willius was an active scholar in both cardiology and medical history. His first major historical publication, Cardiac Classics, co-authored with Mayo Clinic librarian Thomas E. Keys, compiled and analyzed historical texts on cardiac science, contextualizing them within the scientific understanding of their respective eras. His subsequent work, A History of the Heart and the Circulation, offered a comprehensive academic account of the evolving understanding of cardiovascular physiology and its implications for modern medicine. In recognition of his contributions to the history of medicine, the Mayo Clinic established the Willius Society, dedicated to the study and promotion of medical history.

== Biography ==
=== Early life and education ===
Fredrick Arthur Willius was born in St. Paul, Minnesota, to Gustav Otto Conrad Willius (25 November 1831 – 26 September 1924) and his wife Emma (née Klausmeyer, 30 August 1855 – 26 April 1933). Known in childhood as Fritz, Willius received his early education at Van Buren Elementary School in Dayton's Bluff. In 1906, shortly after beginning his third year at Mechanic Arts High School, Willius was struck with an attack of acute appendicitis. When the first operation proved unsuccessful and complications set in, he was operated on by Dr. Arnold Schwyzer on the family's kitchen table. Willius later cited this experience as a key influence in his decision to pursue a career in medicine, despite his father's preference that he study architecture. Fredrick graduated from high school with honors, at which point he enrolled in the University of Minnesota, intending to study medicine. He graduated from the university in 1912 as a Bachelor of Science, and in 1914 as a Doctor of Medicine. He was a member of Phi Rho Sigma Medical Society, as well as the Sigma Xi Scientific Research Honor Society. During the final year of his doctorate program at the University of Minnesota, he participated in research with James F. Corbett on the causes and pathology of diabetes mellitus, for which he was awarded the Rollin E. Cutts Medal for experimental surgery. After graduation, Willius entered into a twelve-month internship at the University Hospital, and in 1915, he began his three-year fellowship in surgery at the Mayo Clinic in Rochester, Minnesota.

=== Medical career ===
Entering into his fellowship, Willius was assigned to work with Henry Stanley Plummer, the clinic's resident diagnostician, who would become a mentor and personal friend. Among his peers in the fellowship program were S. W. Harrington, Alfred Washington Adson, Hermon Carey Bumpus, Jr. (son of Hermon Carey Bumpus), and Stanley J. Seeger, Sr., (father of Stanley J. Seeger). While in this program, Willius realized his interest lay in internal medicine and not surgery, which led to a change of specialty. In addition to his medical training and work at the Clinic, as a fellow, Willius was also responsible for helping operate the ambulance service, which at the time consisted of horse-drawn buggies.

Plummer and his colleague John M. Blackford had, in 1914, installed at the Mayo Clinic one of the first ECG machines in the country, only five years after Alfred Cohn's successful adoption of the technology at Mount Sinai Hospital in New York City. The following year, Willius was appointed first assistant in Medicine, and assigned to work with Blackford and Plummer in the newly established ECG lab. In 1917, he published his first paper with Blackford, on chronic heart-block, which helped establish his credentials as an expert in the field of echocardiography. Later that year, Blackford left Mayo to help start the Virginia Mason Medical Center in Seattle, Washington, at which point Willius was promoted to head of the lab. By 1920, Willius had received his Master of Science in Medicine, and been promoted to Associate in medicine, where his passion for cardiology and diseases of the heart had become apparent.

In 1923, Willius was asked by Plummer, Will Mayo, and Charles Mayo to organize a new section at the Mayo Clinic: cardiology. Willius would remain chief of the cardiology section until his retirement in 1945, after which he remained a senior consultant for more than a decade. Much of the early work at the section revolved around creating standards with which to evaluate patients, both in terms of clinical practice, as well as collecting pertinent medical data to advance the field. Willius laid out strict rules for how patients were to be seen in his section:

"The patient is first received by one of the examining physicians, who is a graduate student in the Mayo Foundation for Medical Education and Research. He records the patient's history, makes a complete physical examination, and writes a tentative diagnosis and opinion. The patient is then seen by the head of the section or by his associate or first assistant, who indicates the special investigations that are to be undertaken. On completion of the special examinations the patient is seen by the head of the section or his associate, who carefully reviews the history and the records of the physical examination, and correlates laboratory records and other data. A diagnosis is made and the treatment outlined".

In addition to his clinical duties, Willius was made an instructor at the Mayo Graduate School of Medicine (now the Mayo Clinic College of Medicine and Science) in 1920. In 1922, he was promoted to assistant professor, in 1927 to associate professor, and in 1945, upon his retirement from practice, to full professor. While focusing on his clinical and educational roles, Willius also engaged in cardiological research, including continuing his research into the use and effectiveness of EKG technology. As his career advanced, he also developed an interest in the formation and pathology of thromboses, the therapeutic use of digitalis, and the effect of syphilis on the human heart. In 1938, Willius and his colleagues John English and Joseph Berkson were among the first clinicians to accurately predict a direct link between tobacco smoking and heart disease, and this research later contributed to reversing decades of false information about the dangers of smoking.

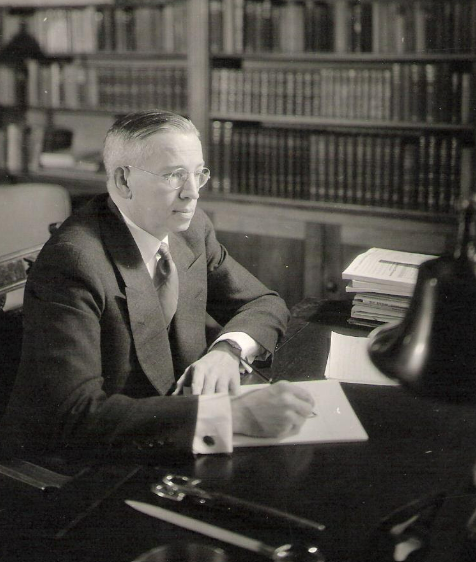
Dr. Willius at home in his study towards the end of his life

=== Retirement and legacy ===
In retirement, Willius's academic focus shifted from cardiology to the history of medicine. In 1941, Willius and Thomas Keys published Cardiac Classics. A Collection of Classic Works on the Heart and Circulation, with Comprehensive Biographic Accounts of the Authors, an exploration of the history of the heart as it pertained to medicine. From William Harvey to James B. Herrick, the book reproduced work by fifty-one scholars, scientists, and doctors who contributed to our understanding of the hear and its workings, and who helped make modern cardiology what it is. In addition, the lives of the selected authors are outlined in detail, further explaining the context of their discoveries and their meaning to scholars today. In 1949, along with his writing partner Thomas J. Dry, Willius wrote A History of the Heart and the Circulation. At once a historical and a medical text, the book explores the intersection between the heart, blood, and medical knowledge, spanning the centuries from ancient times to the present. While of a similar vein to Willius's first volume, this adopts more holistic approach to the study of history, and focuses on exploring and analyzing the trajectory of the science of medicine as a whole, rather than reproducing verbatim the works of previous scholars.

Willius was elected president of the Minnesota chapter of the American Heart Association in 1925. His lifelong organizational ties also included the American Medical Association, the Minnesota Medical Association, the Olmsted-Fillmore-Houston-Dodge Counties Medical Society, the Southern Minnesota Medical Association, the American College of Physicians, the American College of Surgeons, the Minnesota Society for the Study of the Heart and Circulation (President 1925 and 1941), the Central Society for Clinical Research (Charter member), the Central Interurban Clinical Club, the Minnesota Society of Internal Medicine, and the Alumni Association of the Mayo Foundation.

In 1957, Willius was invited by the Royal College of Surgeons to give a speech on the legacy and contributions of William Harvey to his field of cardiology, and medicine as a whole. Due to ill health, he was unable to attend the conference, but his speech was delivered in his stead by his friend and colleague Thomas Forrest Cotton.

A lifelong smoker, Willius suffered from emphysema for much of his later life, but he died from bladder cancer on October 19, 1972. In 2012, a group of Mayo Fellows and residents established the Willius Society: A History of Medicine Organization for Mayo Clinic Residents and Fellows, in honor of Dr. Willius and his "appreciation of medical history and the great physicians of ages past, as well as for his dedication to those who would come after him."

== Family and personal life ==
Willius's father Gustav and uncle Ferdinand were German immigrants who settled in St. Paul and established themselves in banking and finance. The Willius name (English: /ˈwɪliəs/; German: [ˈvɪlɪʊs]) is a Latinized form of Wille, and the family, which is originally native to Kassel, has borne it since at least the 18th century. Through his father's family, Willius was a third cousin of the scientist Albert Wigand, the general Adolf von Deines, and the physician Georg Ledderhose. In addition to his banking career, Fredrick's uncle Ferdinand was also appointed Prussian Consul in Saint Paul in 1867. Emma Klausmeyer's father was Wilhelm Klausmeyer, himself an immigrant from Bavaria, who was a choir director, a pianist, and a member of the faculty of the Cincinnati Conservatory of Music. Fredrick's maternal uncle Alfred Klausmeyer was the founder of the Anchor Buggy Company, an early American manufacturer of automobiles.

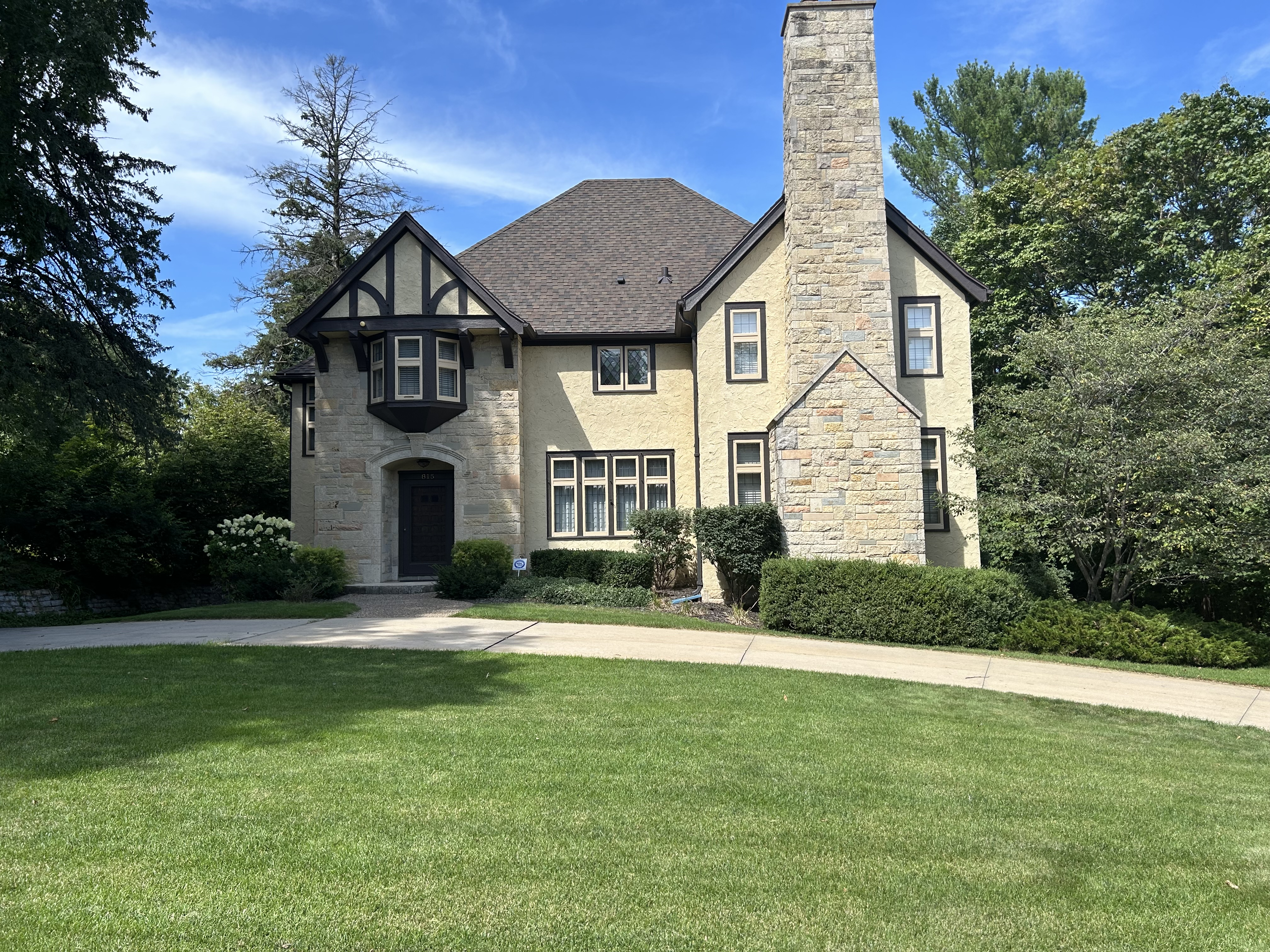
The second Willius family home at 815 8th St. SW, Rochester.

On September 26, 1917, Willius married Stella Mae (née Popple, March 14, 1891 – June 22, 1986). Stella was the daughter of Herbert Eugene Popple (January 1858 – October 15, 1935) and Jennie Johnson (née Johanne Kristoffersdatter, November 14, 1856 – May 27, 1952). Stella was born and raised on her parents' farm in Stewartville, Minnesota, and moved to Rochester in 1916. Stella's elder sister Corena had married Dr. William Plummer, the brother of Willius' mentor Henry Plummer in 1911. This familial connection helped Stella find work at the Mayo clinic, as a technician in the pathology laboratory. It was while working at Mayo that the young couple became acquainted, and they were married shortly after. Their marriage produced three daughters.

- Jane Eleanor (September 8, 1918 – May 18, 2002) married Rudolph Matas Landry, the grandson and namesake of Dr. Rudolph Matas.
- Mary Elizabeth (August 6, 1920 – December 11, 2015)
- Dorothy Corinne (November 19, 1925 -)

The young family initially made their home in a timber-framed house at 319 5th Ave SW, just outside the area that would become known as Pill Hill, due to the high concentration of physicians living there. In 1930, Willius commissioned the architect Harold Hamilton Crawford to build a new, larger home in the Tudor Revival style, firmly within the bounds of Pill Hill at 815 8th St. SW.

== Publications ==
=== Books ===
- Willius, Fredrick A. Clinical Electrocardiography. Philadelphia; London: W.B. Saunders, 1922.
- ---. Clinical Electrocardiograms: Their Interpretation and Significance. Philadelphia; London: W.B. Saunders, 1929.
- ---. Cardiac Clinics: A Mayo Clinic Monograph. St. Louis: C.V. Mosby, 1941.
- ---; Keys, Thomas E. Cardiac Classics: A Collection of Classic Works on the Heart and Circulation, with Comprehensive Biographic Accounts of the Authors. London: H. Kimpton, 1941.
- ---; Dry, Thomas J. A History of the Heart and the Circulation. Philadelphia: W.B. Saunders, 1948.
- ---. Aphorisms of Dr. Charles Horace Mayo, 1865–1939, and Dr. William James Mayo, 1861–1939. Rochester, Minn.: Whiting Press, 1951.
- ---. Henry Stanley Plummer: A Diversified Genius. Springfield, Ill.: Charles C. Thomas, 1960.
- ---; Keys, Thomas E. Classics of Cardiology: A Collection of Classic Works on the Heart and Circulation with Comprehensive Biographic Accounts of the Authors. (2nd ed.) New York.: Dover Publications, Inc., 1961
- ---; Keys, Thomas E. Classics of Cardiology: A Collection of Classic Works on the Heart and Circulation with Comprehensive Biographic Accounts of the Authors. (3rd ed.) Malabar, Florida.: Robert E. Krieger Publishing Company, 1983

=== Notable articles ===
- Blackford, J.M. and F.A. Willius. Auricular flutter. Arch Intern Med (Chic). 1918; XXI(1):147–165.
- Willius, F. A. Arborization block. Arch Intern Med (Chic). 1919;23(4):431–440.
- Willius, F. A., L. B. Wilson and W. M. Boothby. The heart in exophthalmic goiter and adenoma with Hyperthyroidism. Med Clin N Am. 1923;7:189.
- Brown, G.E. and F.A. Willius. Coronary sclerosis: an analysis of eighty-six necropsies. Am. Jour. Med. Sc. 1924; 168, 165-180.
- Haines, S.F. and F.A. Willius. The status of the heart in myxedema. Am. Heart Jr., 1925; i: 67–72.
- Willius, F.A. and S. Amberg. Two cases of secondary tumor of the heart in children, in one of which the diagnosis was made during life. Med. Clin. N. Amer. May 1930; 13:1307-1316.
- Willius, F. A. The heart in old age: a study of seven hundred patients seventy-five years of age and older. Am. Jour, Med. Sc. July 1931; 182:1-12.
- Willius, F.A., H.L. Smith and P.H. Sprague. The incidence and degree of coronary and aortic sclerosis in 5,060 consecutive postmortem examinations. Proc. Staff Meetings of Mayo Clinic March 1 1933; 8:140-144.
- Smith, H.L. and F.A. Willius. Adiposity of the Heart: A Clinical and Pathologic Study of One Hundred and Thirty-six Obese Patients. Arch Intern Med (Chic). 1933;52(6):911–931.
- Boland, E.W. and F.A. Willius. Changes in the Liver Produced by Chronic Passive Congestion: With Special Reference to the Problem of Cardiac Cirrhosis. Arch Intern Med (Chic). 1938;62(5):723–739.
- Dry, T.J. and F.A. Willius. Calcareous Disease of the Aortic Valve: A Study of Two Hundred Twenty-Eight Cases. American Heart Journal. 1939;17(2):138–157.
- English, J.P. F.A. Willius, and J. Berkson. Tobacco and Coronary Disease. JAMA. 1940;115(16):1327–1329.
- Parker, R.L., T.J. Dry, F.A. Willius and R.P. Gage. Life Expectancy in Angina Pectoris. JAMA. 1946;131(2):95–100.
