= Pill Hill, Rochester, Minnesota =

Historic District in Rochester, Minnesota, United States

- Pill Hill Historic District
- U.S. National Register of Historic Places
- U.S. Historic district
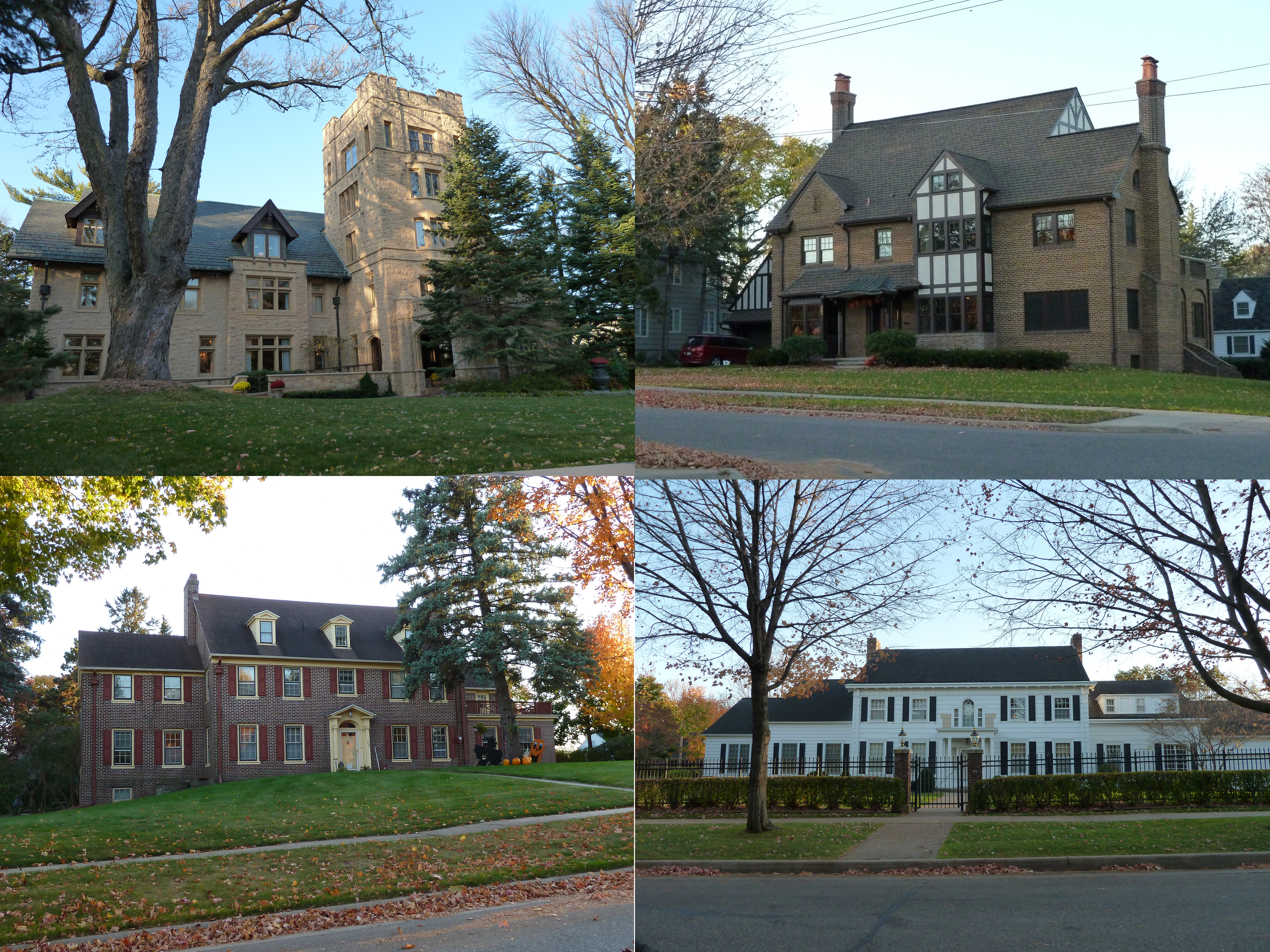
- Several houses from the Historic District

- Location within Minnesota Location within the United States
- Location: Rochester, Minnesota
- Coordinates: 44°01′01″N 92°28′31″W
- Architect: Harold Crawford; Ellerbe & Associates; Garfield Schwarz (builder)
- Architectural style: Colonial Revival, Prairie School, Tudor Revival
- NRHP reference No.: 85003768
- Added to NRHP: November 29, 1990

Pill Hill is a National Register of Historic Places district in Rochester, Minnesota. The residential neighborhood encompasses almost 130 houses built on a limestone bluff, predominantly for staff of the nearby Mayo Clinic. "Pill Hill" was initially an irreverent term coined by early local residents which was eventually embraced by the community. Its period of significance is approximately 1885-1937, with the vast majority of the homes being constructed in an approximately 30-year span in the first third of the 1900s. The neighborhood contains houses that showcase a diverse spectrum of Western architectural tradition, with numerous examples of Colonial revival, Tudor revival, Craftsman style, Prairie school, and Spanish revival homes, and also including fewer examples of Elizabethan revival, French eclectic, Neoclassical, Queen Anne, and Storybook, among others. Notable Minnesotan architects have works represented in the neighborhood, including Harold Crawford (36 houses, including 5 remodels), Ellerbe and Associates (approximately 30 houses), and Edwin Lundie (three houses). The original owners of the homes and past residents also contribute to the neighborhood's historic significance, including Nobel prizewinners Edward Calvin Kendall and Luis Walter Alvarez, as well as numerous pioneers and leaders in medicine who worked at the adjacent Mayo Clinic including William J. Mayo, John W. Kirklin, Fredrick A. Willius, Louis B. Wilson, and Alfred W. Adson, among many others.

In 1990, Pill Hill was added to the National Register of Historic Places. Homeowners in the neighborhood started a grassroots campaign in 2023 and were successful in achieving a local historic landmark district designation for Pill Hill from the City of Rochester in 2025.

== List of Residences in the Pill Hill Historic District ==
See List of Residences in Pill Hill Historic District, Rochester, Minnesota.

== Boundary ==
The boundaries of Pill Hill are roughly 3rd and 9th streets and 7th and 10th avenues Southwest. The Mayo Foundation House, the historic home of William J. Mayo, is within the district and serves as the neighborhood's boundary to the northeast. The Plummer House, the historic home of Henry S. Plummer, lies just outside Pill Hill to the southwest and is a separately-listed historic landmark. More generally the neighborhood is found between U.S. 52, U.S. 63 (Broadway), Memorial Parkway, and 2nd Street SW. Saint Mary's Hospital is at the bottom of the hill to the northwest of the district.

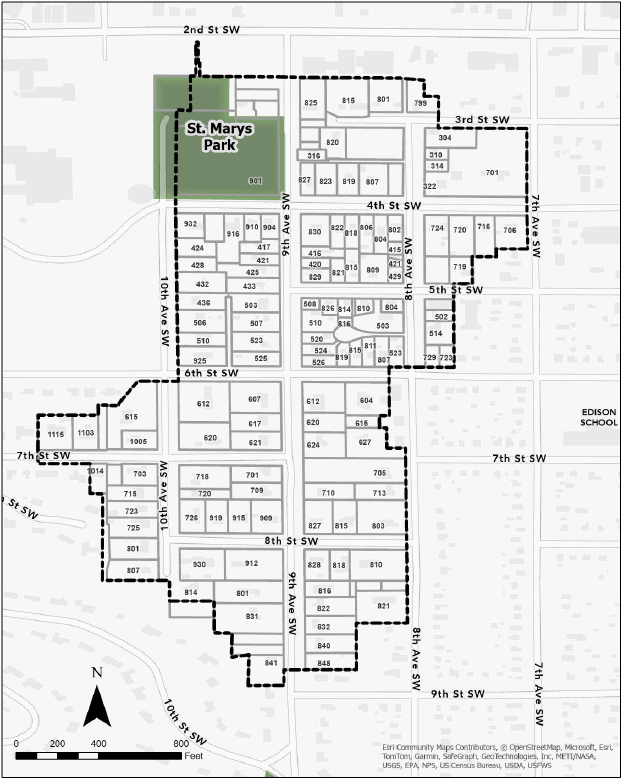
Boundary map of the Pill Hill Historic District as accepted by the City of Rochester, MN in 2025. It closely matches the National Register listing.
