= Hugh Butt =

American physician

- Education: University of Virginia; University of Minnesota
- Occupation: Physician

Hugh Roland Butt (January 8, 1910 – August 16, 2008) was an American physician who developed methods to treat hemorrhaging patients with vitamin K.

Butt was born in Belhaven, North Carolina. He earned his M.D. from the University of Virginia in 1933 and a master's degree in medicine from the University of Minnesota in 1937.

Butt was a resident at the Mayo Clinic when he made his most notable finding that Vitamin K stopped bleeding in patients with jaundice, previously a fatal condition. He later worked with dicumarol isolated by Paul Link, and conducted the first human studies that demonstrated its blood thinning properties. He worked at the Mayo Clinic his entire career, including terms on both the board of governors and board of trustees and was widely considered the last link to its founders (he was supervised by William Mayo). After becoming an assistant professor in 1943, Butt studied liver disease, especially cirrhosis. He was appointed full professor in 1952, after which he began focusing on administrative issues. He was a leading advocate of continuing education for doctors.

Butt served as president of the American College of Physicians in 1971 and 1972, and retired in the 1980s. He died in Rochester, Minnesota.
