= Viola Cooperative Creamery =

- U.S. National Register of Historic Places
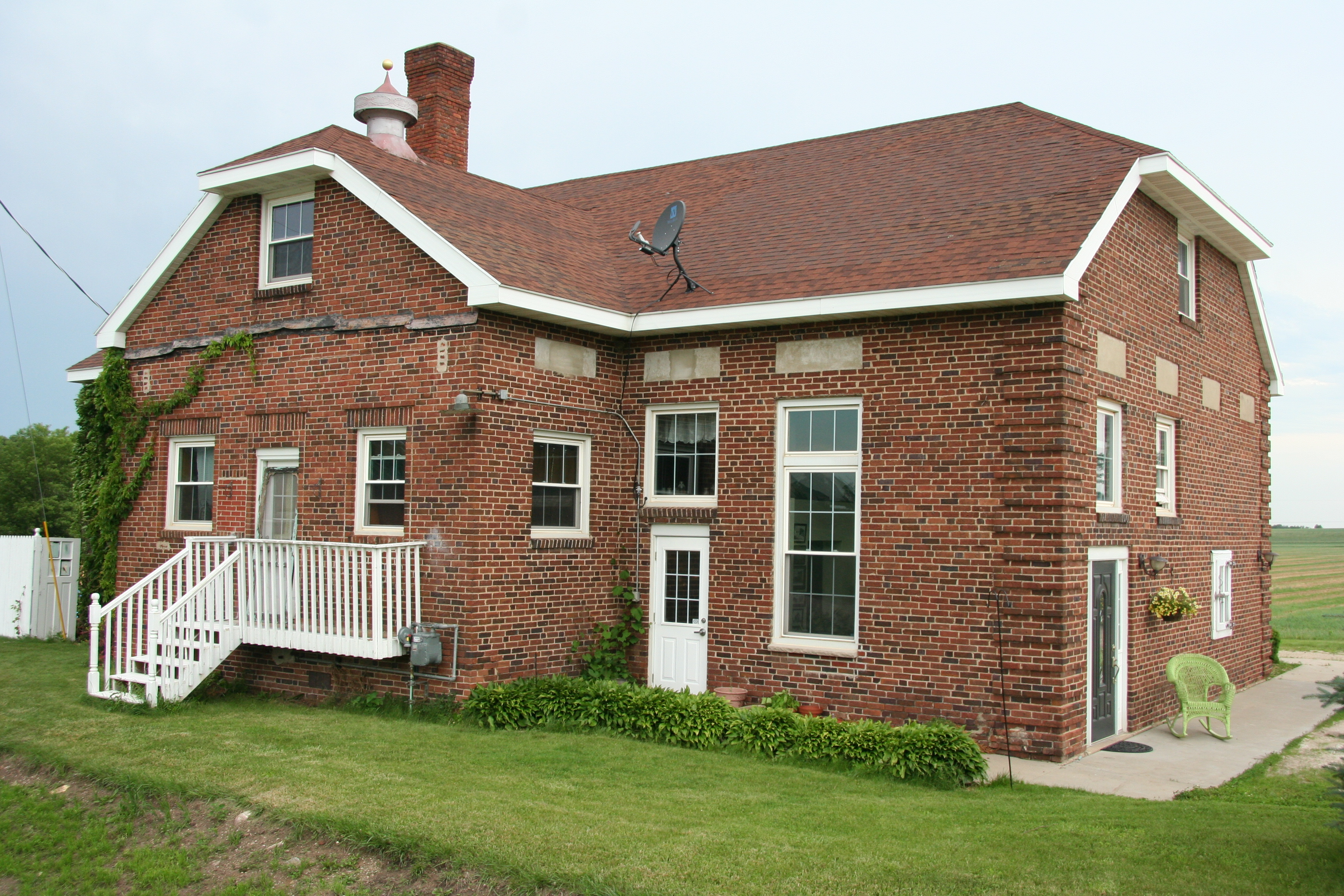
- The building in 2010, seen from the southeast

- Location within Minnesota Location within the United States
- Nearest city: Viola, Minnesota
- Coordinates: 44°3′52.52″N 92°16′9.54″W
- Built: 1924
- Architect: Crawford, Harold H.
- Architectural style: Colonial Revival
- NRHP reference No.: 99001310
- Added to NRHP: November 12, 1999

The Viola Creamery is a rural building on the National Register of Historic Places in Viola, Minnesota, United States. It was designed by architect Harold Crawford and in built in 1924.

== History ==
This brick building replaced the previous creamery, a wood-frame building which burned down in the winter of 1923. The creamery produced specialty butter used in restaurants as distant as New York City.

In 1947, the last shipment of butter stamped "Viola Creamery Specials" left the creamery destined for Chicago. During World War II, higher demand and competition for refrigerated milk trucks made larger creameries viable. Most smaller specialty creameries were forced to close.

Between 1946 and 1961, the creamery was used for various purposes, including a cabinet-making shop and a boat-building business.

In 1961, the creamery was purchased and used to produce honey, handling every step of the process from hive to jar. This business operated until it was closed down by the United States Department of Agriculture in 1987.

Between 1987 and 1998, the creamery remained vacant and slowly deteriorated. Vandals began to destroy the building. Windows were broken out and the 12-foot-tall (3.7 m) cupola was stolen from the roof. Because of the gaping hole left behind, hundreds of pigeons took over the second level of the building and mice inhabited the rest.

In August 1998, the creamery was purchased by Don Helgerson, a bricklayer by trade. He began to restore the creamery to its original condition and had it placed on the National Register of Historic Places in 1999.

In 2002, the creamery was renovated into a fine-dining restaurant, the Viola Creamery Steakhouse, which closed three years later in the winter of 2005.

In April 2007, the creamery was purchased and converted into a single-family residential home.
