= Harold Crawford (architect) =

American architect (1888–1981)

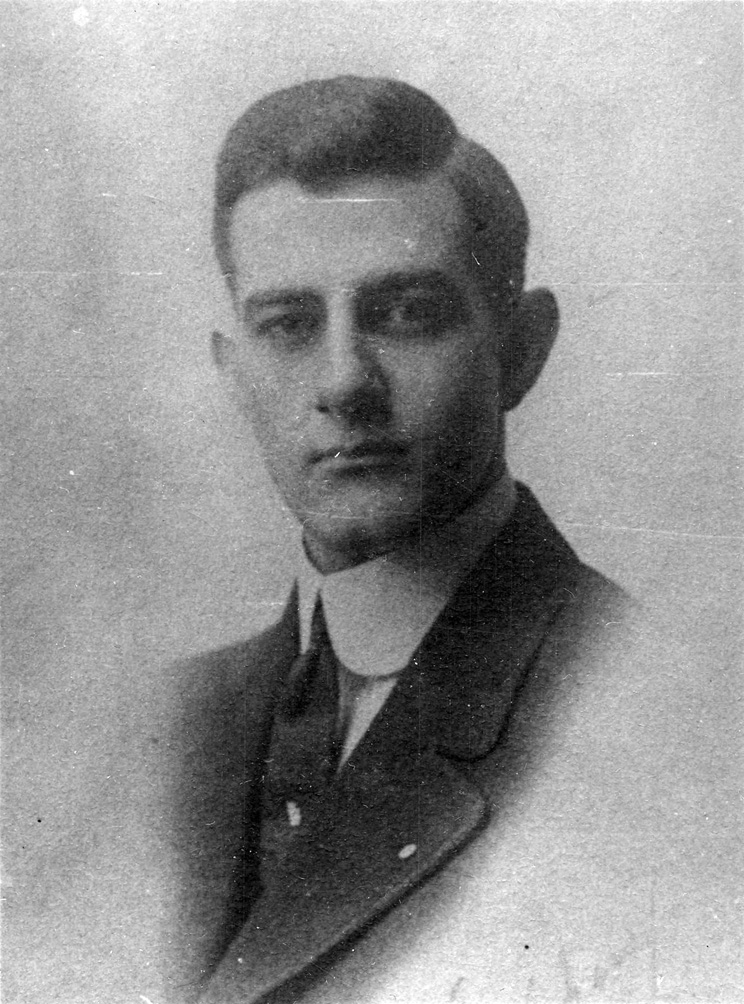
- Crawford c. 1920
- Born: April 6, 1888; Beaver Creek, Minnesota
- Died: May 8, 1981 (aged 93); Rochester, Minnesota
- Resting place: Rochester, Minnesota
- Education: Harvard University
- Occupation: Architect
- Years active: 1916–1965
- Spouse: May Fisher (m. 1919)
- Children: 1
- Projects: Pill Hill, Rochester, Minnesota

Harold Hamilton Crawford (April 6, 1888 – May 8, 1981) was an American architect known for his contributions to early 20th-century architecture in the Midwest, particularly in Rochester, Minnesota, with a long career spanning from 1916-1965. Notable works include the former Rochester Public Library building in downtown Rochester now known as the Mitchell Student Center and part of the Mayo Clinic Alix School of Medicine; as well as numerous residences in the Pill Hill Residential Historic District in Rochester, Minnesota, currently recognized on the National Register of Historic Places.

== Early life and education ==
Crawford was born on April 6, 1888, in Beaver Creek, Minnesota, to parents Isaac Franklin "Frank" Crawford (1861–1922) and Carrie Salome Seymour (1860–1936, born in Orion Township near Eyota, MN). He spent some of his early teenage years in Lead, South Dakota, living with his aunt and uncle. He was enrolled as a freshman at the high school in Lead and eventually transferred back to Minnesota to complete high school at Rochester High School. In 1908, Crawford was accepted into the School of Architecture at the University of Illinois, where he was exposed to the architectural styles of Louis Sullivan, Dankmar Adler, Daniel Burnham, and Frank Lloyd Wright in nearby Oak Park. At Illinois, Crawford worked directly under Chicago architects James M. White, James B. Dibelka, and Leon M. Stanhope. He received his Bachelor of Art and Architecture degree in 1913, and worked briefly at the Chicago Building Inspection Department under Mr. Stanhope. From 1914 to 1916, Crawford pursued and was awarded a master's degree in art and architecture from Harvard University. While in Boston, he became friends and colleagues with prominent architect Frank Chouteau Brown, helping spark his enthusiasm for residential design. While at Harvard, he studied drawing under Hermann Dudley Murphy and watercolor painting under Herbert Langford Warren. In 1916, he returned home to Rochester, Minnesota, to be near and care for his mother and start his architectural practice.

== Career and architectural style ==
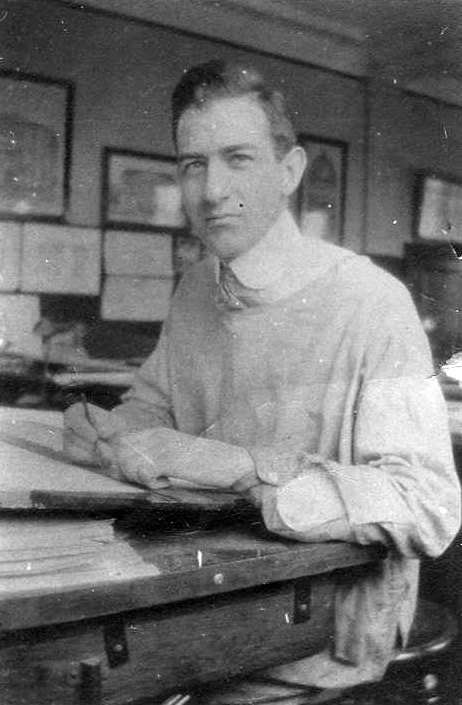
Photograph of Harold H. Crawford at the drafting table, c. 1920

After returning to Rochester, Crawford’s first commission was for Dr. Christopher Graham, a founding member of the Mayo Clinic. This commission and others helped to establish Crawford's reputation as a prominent residential architect, eventually designing many homes for Mayo Clinic physicians, especially in the Pill Hill Residential Historic District and surrounding neighborhood. During World War I, Crawford joined the army as a second lieutenant. One of his first commissions after the War was for Parish Hall at Cavalry Episcopal Church. Crawford is attributed to over 180 structures, the slight majority of which (ninety eight) were residential. He designed seventy houses in southwest Rochester and twenty three outside of Rochester. In his residential projects, he was known for often being on site with his clients and making final design decisions and changes at the job site. His portfolio also included numerous non-residential structures including commercial and agricultural buildings, government buildings, schools, creameries, medical buildings, churches, and apartment buildings. He was known for making elaborately detailed drafts of properties without the assistance of a draftsman. A frequent collaborator in the construction of Crawford's designs was Garfield Schwarz, whose company also constructed every Mayo Clinic building from 1914-1948, including the iconic Plummer Building.

Crawford's architectural style was diverse, producing works adhering to principles found in many different schools including Tudor Revival, Dutch Colonial, Craftsman, Georgian, Mediterranean Revival, and Art Deco, or sometimes borrowing ideas from multiple schools as in the Eclectic School. His use of eclectic details was generally restrained in his works. His most common residential style was Colonial (thirty six structures), followed by Tudor revival (twenty three structures), for which he is perhaps best known. His signature residential style eventually became known by its exterior details of brickwork, stucco, stone, and half timbering, alongside elaborate brick chimneys, slate roofs, and wrought iron balconies. A reddish brown Chicago brick was the most common material used in his non-residential utilitarian structures. His practice slowed after World War II and he shifted towards fewer works performed mostly for his personal friends. He retired around 1965.

== Personal life ==
Crawford met his future wife, May Fisher (1886–1945), while on an architectural assignment at the home of Dr. Georgine M. Luden at 618 3rd St SW, where May was residing at the time. They were married on September 10th, 1919 in Dr. Luden's home. Harold and May adopted their daughter Margaret in November of 1920, after Margaret's biologic mother, a patient of Dr. Luden's, had died from cancer when Margaret was an infant. Crawford designed his own home (1926) at 514 8th Ave SW, an Arts & Crafts style cottage where the Crawford family lived, along with his mother Carrie, and rented out the lower level; their first tenant in 1927 was Philip Showalter Hench. Crawford was an active member of the community in Rochester, including membership at the Masonic Lodge, Rochester Art Center, Rochester Rotary Club, Rochester Golf and Country Club, and Calvary Episcopal Church. Crawford died on May 8, 1981 at the Methodist Campus of Mayo Clinic Hospital and is buried at Oakwood Cemetery in Rochester.

== Selected works ==
=== Residential structures ===
- Residence for Edward Calvin Kendall, 627 8th Ave SW, (1919)
- Residence for Edward Rosenow, 617 9th Ave SW (1919)
- Residence for Benjamin I. Scott, 8429 55th St SW in Rock Dell, MN (1921)
- Residence for George B. Eusterman, 925 6th St SW, Rochester (1923)
- Residence for W. L. Benedict, 909 8th St SW, Rochester (1924)
- Residence for Donald Balfour, “Cairnbrae” 5500 Heather Dr SW, Rochester (1925)
- Residence for Louis B. Wilson, “Walnut Hill” at Assisi Heights, Rochester (1925)
- Furlow Apartments, 512 4th St SW, Rochester (1926)
- Residence for Verne C. Hunt, 810 8th St SW, Rochester (1926)
- Residence for Harold Crawford, 514 8th Ave SW, Rochester (1926)
- Residence for Newton E. Holland, 834 7th Ave SW, Rochester (1927)
- Residence for Byrl R. Kirklin, father of John W. Kirklin, 1104 7th St SW, Rochester (1927)
- Residence for Alfred Washington Adson, 831 9th Ave SW, Rochester (1928)
- Residence for Louis T. Austin, 526 9th Ave SW, Rochester (1929)
- Residence for Samuel F. Haines, 620 9th Ave SW, Rochester (1930)
- Residence for Fredrick Arthur Willius, 815 8th St SW, Rochester (1930)
- Residence for Albert C. Broders, 821 8th Ave SW, Rochester (1936)
- Residence for James Watson Kernohan, 918 9th Ave SW, Rochester (1936)
- Residence for Charles H. Mayo, 2200 East 5th Street, Tucson, AZ (1937)
- Residence for Garfield Schwartz, 1127 7th St SW, Rochester (1954)
- Numerous additional residences in the Pill Hill Residential Historic District in Rochester, MN See List of Residences in Pill Hill Historic District, Rochester, Minnesota.

=== Non-residential structures ===
- Zumbro Creamery in Rock Dell, MN (1919)
- Trinity Lutheran Church in Hayfield, MN (1922)
- Mankato Clinic Building (Ridgley Bldg) 227 Main Street, Mankato, MN (1922)
- Creamery for Eyota Dairy Cooperative (1923)
- Viola Cooperative Creamery (1924)
- Dover School in Dover, MN (1925)
- Oronoco School in Oronoco, MN (1926)
- Rochester Bread Company, 300 11th Ave NW, Rochester (1928)
- Methodist Episcopal Church, 824 Church St, St. Charles, MN (1928)
- Folwell Elementary School, 603 15th Ave SW, Rochester (1930)
- Holland's Cafeteria,216 1st Ave SW, Rochester (1930)
- Rochester Post Office, formerly on the corner of 4th Ave and 4th St SW (1932) demolished 1978
- Rochester Public Library, 226 2nd St SW, Rochester (1936-37) now the Mitchell Student Center and part of the Mayo Clinic Alix School of Medicine
- Jefferson Elementary School, 10th Ave and 14th St SE, Rochester (1949)
- Longfellow Elementary School, 1615 Marion Rd SE, Rochester (1950)

=== Remodels and additions ===
- Residence for Christopher Graham, 813 3rd Ave SE, Rochester, remodel (1916) demolished
- Balfour Hall, Calvary Episcopal Church, Rochester (1919)
- Carriage house for Georgine Luden, 618 3rd St SW (1919)
- Residence for Fred S. Haines, 620 10th Ave SW, remodel (1919)
- Residence for Charles Horace Mayo, 3320 Mayowood Dr SW, “White Gables” remodel (1920)
- Carriage house for Donald Balfour, 427 6th Ave SW, Rochester (1928)
- Residence for Charles William Mayo, 3720 Mayowood Rd SW “Mayowood Historic Home” remodel (1930)
