= Augustus Stinchfield =

American physician (1842–1917)

- Born: December 21, 1842; Phillips, Maine, U.S.
- Died: March 15, 1917 (aged 74); Rochester, Minnesota, U.S.
- Education: Bowdoin College; University of Michigan

Augustus W. Stinchfield (December 21, 1842 – March 15, 1917) was an American physician and one of the co-founders—along with Drs. Charles Horace Mayo, William James Mayo, Christopher Graham, E. Starr Judd, Henry Stanley Plummer, Melvin Millet and Donald Balfour—of the Mayo Clinic in Rochester, Minnesota.

== Life and career ==
Stinchfield was born in Phillips, Maine and received his early education in the nearby town of Strong. He moved from Maine to Wisconsin as a young man and, in 1864, enlisted as a private in Company F of the 39th Wisconsin Infantry Regiment. After the Civil War, he attended Bowdoin College and the University of Michigan. He received his M.D. degree from Bowdoin College in 1868. After practicing medicine in Verona, Missouri, as well as Dundas and Eyota, Minnesota, Stinchfield was asked by William Worrall Mayo to join the Mayos' practice in 1892. William Worrall Mayo was retiring and wanted a mid-career physician to balance the growing private practice.

While the Mayo brothers excelled in surgery, Stinchfield was well qualified to handle the non-surgical duties of the practice. When Will Mayo approached the remaining partners in 1915 about changing the private practice to a not-for-profit practice, Stinchfield was the first to sign the agreement. When the remaining partners signed the transfer papers, this gift insured the long-term survival, development and growth of the Mayo Clinic.

== Bibliography ==
- "Psychological influences in health and disease", Tr. Minnesota State Medical Society, 1875, pp. 30–40
- "Sciatic neuritis", Northwest. Lancet, 14:184, 1894
- "Gastritis", Northwest. Lancet, 15:321–324, 1895
- "The treatment of pleurisy", Northwest. Lancet, 16:395, 1896
- "Nervous syndroms of Bright's disease", Northwest. Lancet, 16:449, 1896
- "Bronchitis and its complications", Northwest. Lancet, 17:452–455, 1897
- "Cardiac dilation", St. Paul Med. Jour. 2:610–615, 1900
