= Dr. William J. Mayo House =

Historic house in Minnesota, United States

- U.S. National Register of Historic Places
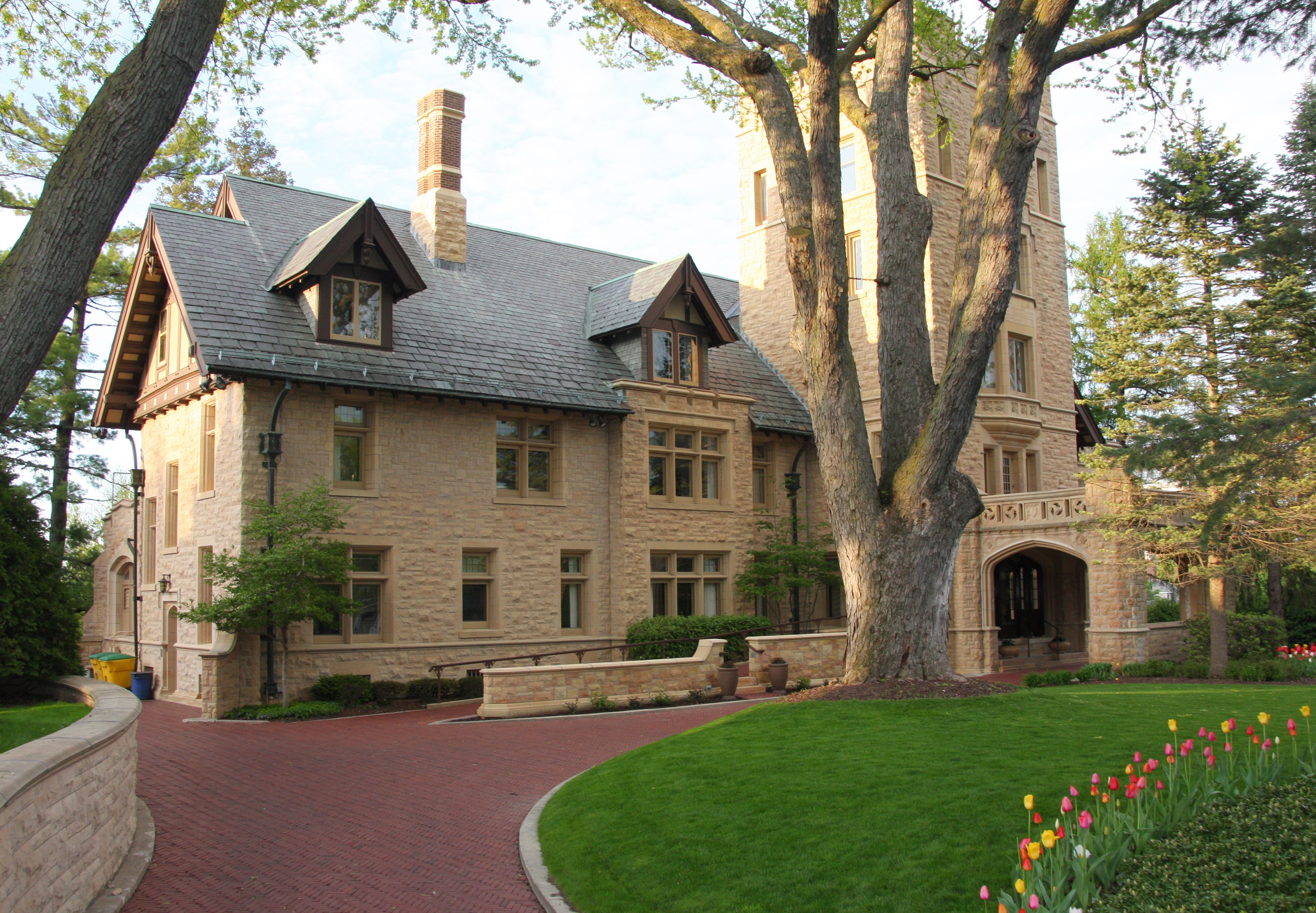
- The Foundation House in 2017

- Location within Minnesota Location within the United States
- Location: 701 4th St., SW, Rochester, Minnesota
- Coordinates: 44°1′8″N 92°28′15″W
- Area: less than one acre
- Built: 1916
- Architect: Ellerbe & Assoc.
- NRHP reference No.: 75001001
- Added to NRHP: March 26, 1975

The Dr. William J. Mayo House is a historic house on the U.S. National Register of Historic Places located in the Pill Hill Historic District in Rochester, Minnesota. Built in 1916, the house showcases a unique combination of Renaissance Revival and English Tudor styles, designed by the architectural firm Ellerbe and Associates for Dr. William J. Mayo, one of seven co-founders of the Mayo Clinic, and his wife, Hattie Damon Mayo. Also known as the Mayo Foundation House, it was listed on the U.S. National Register of Historic Places in 1975. The 24,000 square foot home contains 47 rooms on 6 floors; the exterior walls are made of Kasota limestone quarried in Minnesota; the roof is green slate from Lake Superior. It was donated by Dr. Mayo in 1938 "for the good of mankind" to serve as a meeting place for the Mayo Foundation, and has since been a regular meeting place for leaders in medicine and visiting dignitaries and U.S. presidents. It is currently owned and maintained by the Mayo Clinic and used for private functions; it is not open to the public.
