= Edwin Hugh Lundie =

American architect (1886-1972)

Edwin Hugh Lundie (October 13, 1886 – January 8, 1972) was an American architect who established his firm in 1917, in downtown Saint Paul, Minnesota. He designed homes, country estates, timber-frame cabins, and public spaces, until his death at age 85. “He consistently drew from the vernacular forms that connected him to his clients’ tastes,” favoring the historical architectural precedents of Norman, Tudor, early Scandinavian, and American colonial. In 1922, he became a member of the American Institute of Architects (AIA), and in 1948, he became Fellow, FAIA, “for his contribution to the advancement of the profession because of his achievement in design.” “Lundie belongs to a generation who came to the profession with a background in the grand manner of the Beaux-Arts but went on to pursue a career devoted to the domestic work – a regionalist in the best sense of the word with work connecting to Scandinavian sources that no doubt resonated with many of his clients because of their ancestry but also seemed admirably suited to the lake country of northern Minnesota.”

== Life and work ==
Edwin H. Lundie was born in Cedar Rapids, Iowa, and at the age of thirteen, he moved with his parents to Salem, South Dakota. Then, just out of high school, in 1904, he departed for Saint Paul, Minnesota, where he began his career in architecture as an apprentice in the Saint Paul firm of Cass Gilbert (1858-1934) with Mr. Gilbert's colleague Thomas Holyoke (1866-1925), from 1904 through 1911. When Mr. Gilbert moved entirely to his office in New York, Edwin Lundie worked briefly with Louis Lockwood (1864-1907) and continued as a draftsman for Thomas Holyoke while studying drawing at the Saint Paul School of Art. With the encouragement of Mr. Holyoke, in 1911, Edwin Lundie joined the staff of the firm of the French-trained Emmanuel Masqueray (1861-1917) as draftsman, with affiliation in the Atelier Masqueray, in Saint Paul, influenced through the American Society of Beaux-Arts Architecture. For the next several years Edwin Lundie assimilated into Masqueray’s office, and was steeped in the rigors of an enormous workload of complex and grand-scale architectural commissions, while readily absorbing the principles of architectural design.

Lundie became a lead draftsman remaining with Emmanuel Masqueray until the latter’s unexpected death in 1917. At this time, Edwin Lundie, with two of his fellow draftsmen, Frederick Slifer (1885-1948) and Frank Abrahamson (1885-1972), from the office of Monsieur Masqueray, formed a temporary partnership to divide and complete several of Masqueray’s remaining commissions. Lundie was individually responsible for overseeing the implementation and completion of Masqueray’s designs for the Cathedral of Saint Joseph in Sioux Falls, South Dakota, and the Chapel of Saint Thomas Aquinas, at the University of St. Thomas, in Saint Paul, Minnesota. This same year, in 1917, Edwin H. Lundie opened his own office in Saint Paul’s Endicott building, where he had been employed for the prior thirteen years, and where he would remain in private practice as an architect for the next five decades specializing in domestic architecture varying in scale from cottages to country estates.

“Lundie did not call on the repertoire of the more lavish Renaissance and Beaux-Arts forms that distinguished the careers of his previous employers. Instead, he took his classical training and inherent art talent in a different direction, favoring smaller, less formal designs on a more intimate scale. Lundie’s architecture was defined by the use of traditional materials, processes, and the talents of a variety of artisans.” While his architect peers were favoring modern or contemporary design commissions, “[Lundie] created a paradigm for an intimate cultural connectedness so often missing in the modernist, somewhat elitist proposition of service. That model would give greater importance to the transformation of convention, type, style, and image and put diminished importance on invention.”

Edwin Lundie’s approach to design was to convey the spirit of not only what was necessary to execute the authenticity of his creations, but also to exemplify the charm of engagement of human craftsmanship. He always wished to attract clients who represented what he called “an aristocracy of good taste,” and he chose his clients, whether for big projects or small, who he thought had an awareness and appreciation for fine things, who “want fine things done for them within what they can afford to do.” “A man of modesty, he struggled with the problem of how much the architect should lead. Ultimately, he thought of his clients first and served them well. His reassuring structures are models of his perfectionist bent, as well as expressions of his eye for beautiful materials: brick, stone, timber, wrought iron. He spent many hours with clients to realize their personal wishes, and then he would supervise the workmen closely to exact the best standards of craftsmanship from them. He had all the gifts, not the least of which was a lack of egotism, to make people’s dream houses come true.”

“He communicated his vision with clients and was inspired to express his ideas through presentation drawings and design. He was a true artist of the architectural perspective rendering genre, always paying meticulous attention to the chronological architectural period, studying and refining the details, and applying great sensitivity to the picturesque context of each client architectural situation.” Lundie was celebrated as an architect for his ability to design spaces that cater to human needs, emotions, behaviors, and well-being, blending functionality with charm. His innate talent lay in creating personalized environments for his discerning clientele. By integrating elements that evoke positive emotions, employing warm materials, and crafting cozy spaces, Lundie ensured that his designs resonated with the occupants on an emotional level. Furthermore, his emphasis on designing spaces in harmony with human scale and proportions aimed to establish a sense of balance and comfort within the environment. “He sustained a high level of humanness in his type and method. Through paradigm shifts in technology, new types and new methods come and go; a sense of humanity often escapes, but architecture is enhanced when it is sustained. Through finesse his designs extended toward what his clients found aesthetically pleasing and comfortable: a delivery of his integration of art and architecture.”

“In sharp contrast to the Modernists who were getting much of the attention during the height of his career, Lundie gravitated toward the classical. His work was inspired both by...the French Beaux-Arts movement and the practicality of the Colonial Revivalists: homes with even proportions, shutters and a cottage style that evoked a feeling of rural England or the French countryside. Lundie’s trademark became taking basic elements of the home and turning them into discrete works of art.” “Edwin Lundie designed houses that evoke a sense of the old way of building, elemental and beyond the whims of style. Whereas most Period Revival architects approached their work as a kind of theater, for Lundie it seems to have been more: a genuine effort to find meaning in the forms and techniques of the past.”

== Personal life ==
Edwin Hugh Lundie's parents were Samuel F. and Emma Lenora (Hitchcock) Lundie. He married Grace Holroyd Nash, October 17, 1917. The couple had one child, Ellen Louise (Mrs. Charles Edward Thompson).
