= Charles Horace Mayo =

American physician (1865–1939)

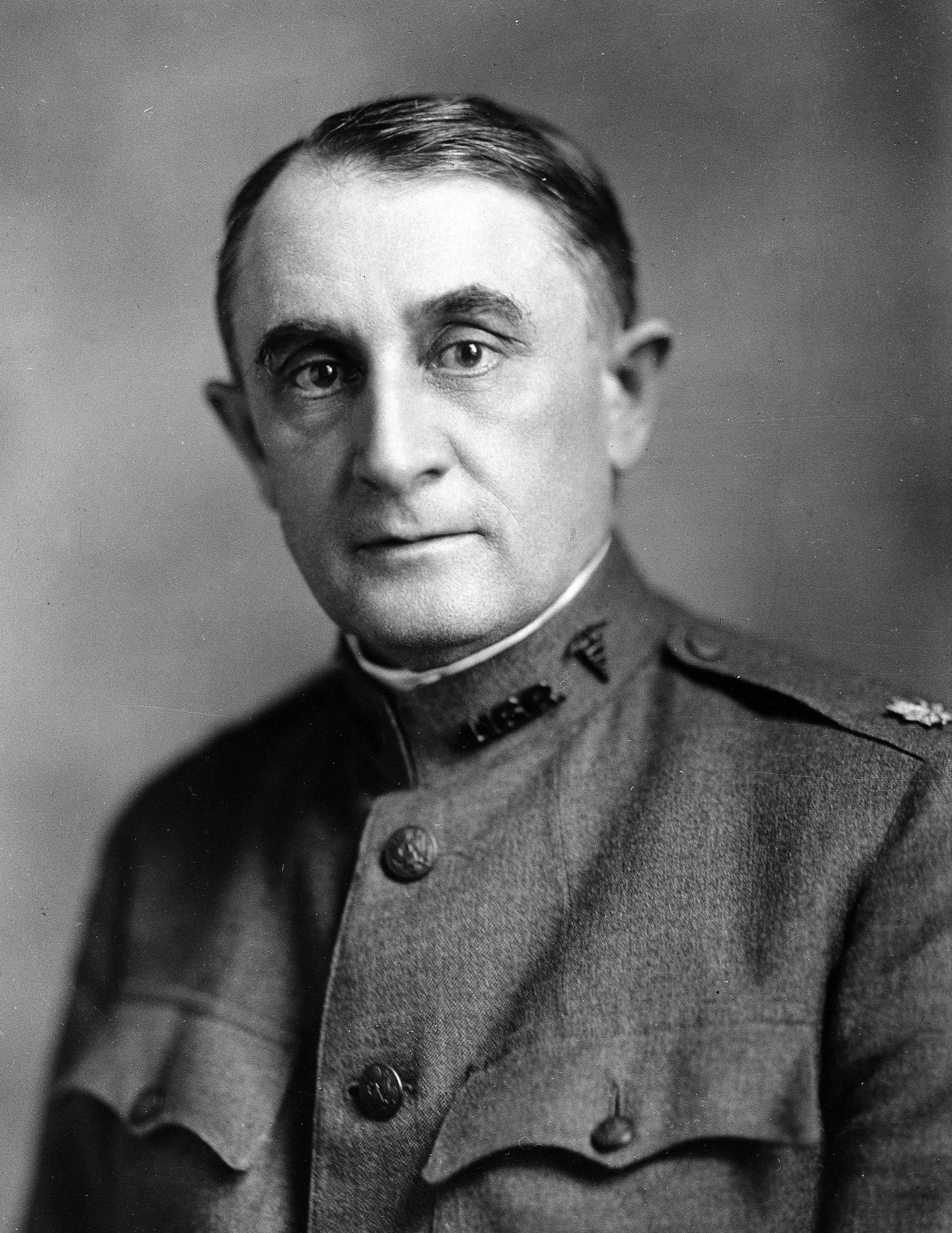
- Born: July 19, 1865; Rochester, Minnesota, U.S.
- Died: May 26, 1939 (aged 73); Chicago, Illinois, U.S.
- Resting place: Oakwood Cemetery, Rochester, Minnesota, U.S.
- Education: Northwestern University (MD)
- Occupation: ophthalmologist
- Known for: Founding of the Mayo Clinic
- Children: 1
- Scientific career
- Fields: Medicine, surgery

Charles Horace Mayo (July 19, 1865 – May 26, 1939) was an American medical practitioner and was one of the founders of the Mayo Clinic along with his brother William James Mayo, Augustus Stinchfield, Christopher Graham, Edward Star Judd Jr., Henry Stanley Plummer, Melvin Millet, and Donald Balfour.

== Career ==
Charles graduated with M.D. from Northwestern University in 1888. After postgraduate studies at New York Polyclinic Medical School, he joined his father, William Worrall Mayo, and older brother, William James Mayo, in their private medical practice in Rochester, Minnesota.

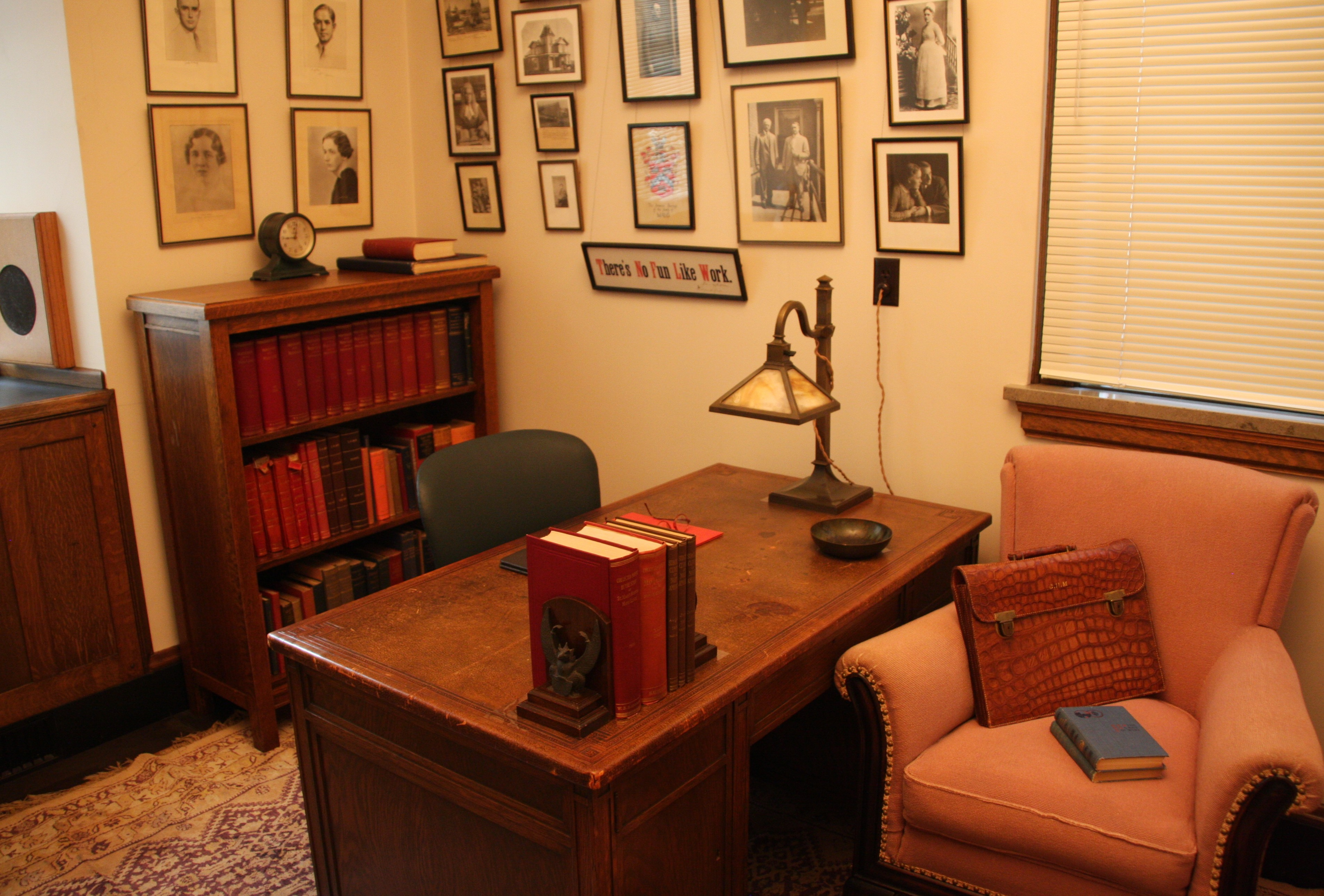
Last office of Charles Mayo as it was during his lifetime

The Mayos' first partner was Augustus Stinchfield, who was hired by William Worrall Mayo. Once in place as a partner in the private practice, W. W. Mayo retired at age 73. The private practice became the not-for-profit Mayo Clinic in 1919. At that point, the remaining partners went on salary, and the Mayo Properties Association was established. The world's first "integrated group practice" was established by the seven partners and staff.

The Mayo Clinic came to be regarded as one of the foremost medical treatment and research institutions in the world. Within Mayo's lifetime, it registered one million patients.

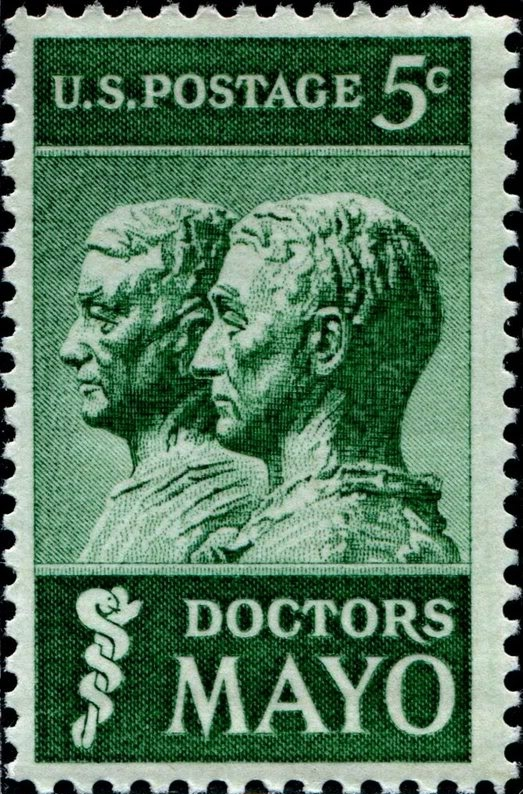
Doctors Mayo stamp

The idea of medical specialization was developed by this group of medical pioneers. A close and enduring relationship between the Mayo Clinic and the University of Minnesota Medical School developed. C. H. Mayo specialized in surgery of the thyroid and nervous system.

He was also responsible for the clinic's ophthalmic patients until 1908. He and early partners insisted on sterile conditions in the operating room, and that was one of many factors that contributed to the medical practice's early surgical successes.

Charles H. Mayo was professionally active in numerous medical and academic bodies. He was successively President of the Western Surgical Association (1904–1905), President of the Minnesota State Medical Association (1905–1906), President of the Section on Surgery of the International Congress on Tuberculosis (1908–1909), and President of the Clinical Congress of Surgeons of North America (1911–1912). In 1913, he became a Regent and Fellow of the American College of Surgeons, serving as its president from 1923 to 1925. He was President of the American Medical Association in 1916–1917, President of the Section on General Surgery of the Pan-American Medical Association from 1932 to 1934, and of the Minnesota Public Health Association from 1932 to 1936, becoming its Honorary President in 1936.

During World War I, Mayo and his brother served as chief surgical consultants for the U.S. Army. Commissioned a colonel in 1917, in 1921 he was commissioned brigadier general in the Officers' Reserve Corps of the U.S. Army, and subsequently held rank as brigadier general in the Army Medical Department (from 1926) and as brigadier general in the Auxiliary Army of the United States from 1931. From 1919 to 1936, when he retired, he was a member of the Senate of the University of Minnesota and professor of surgery in the UMN medical school.

Charles H. Mayo was engaged in numerous civic organizations. He was a professor of surgery at the University of Minnesota, active there and nationally in both Alpha Kappa Kappa and Sigma Xi fraternities.

== Personal life ==
Charles Mayo's wife was Edith Graham, of Rochester, Minnesota, whom he married in 1893. He belonged to the Episcopal Church, the Freemasons, Rochester Lodge #21 of the Grand Lodge of Minnesota, AF&AM, the Knights Templar, the Scottish Rite Masons, the Shriners, Kiwanis, and was active in numerous other professional, civic and social clubs.

Mayo retired in 1930 and died of pneumonia in 1939 in Chicago, Illinois. His two sons Charles William Mayo and Joseph Graham Mayo both worked at the clinic. Joseph Graham Mayo was killed in November 1936 in an accident when a train hit his car killing him and his hunting dog, Floosie. Mayo and his dog were buried in the same casket. A grandson, Charles Horace Mayo II, served a residency at the clinic.

== Recognition ==
Mayo received numerous distinctions both during and after his life:

- Army Distinguished Service Medal (1920)
- Officer of the Legion of Honour of France (1925)
- Officer of the Order of Public Instruction (Golden Palms) of France (1925)
- Officer of the Order of Arts and Letters of France (1925)
- Commander of the Order of the Crown of Italy (1932)
- The United States Postal Service released a stamp on September 11, 1964, depicting Charles Horace Mayo and his brother.

Awards and achievements
Preceded by Victor Emmanuel III of Italy	Cover of Time; 22 June 1925	Succeeded by Theodore E. Burton
