= William James Mayo =

American surgeon (1861–1939)

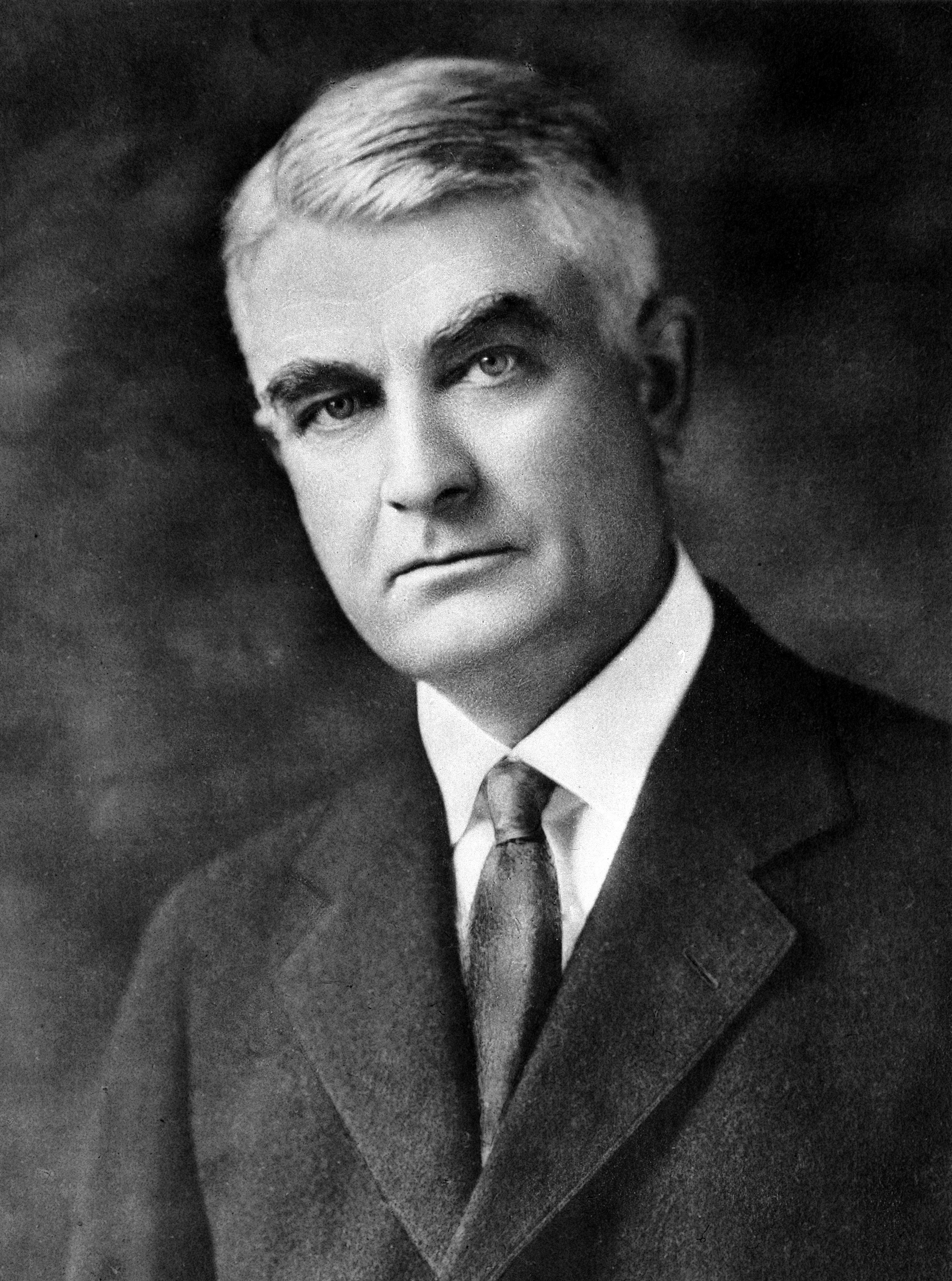
- Born: June 29, 1861; Le Sueur, Minnesota, U.S.
- Died: July 28, 1939 (aged 78); Rochester, Minnesota, U.S.
- Resting place: Oakwood Cemetery, Rochester, Minnesota, U.S.
- Education: University of Michigan (M.D.)
- Known for: One of the principal founders of the Mayo Clinic
- Awards: Distinguished Service Medal (U.S. Army)
- Scientific career
- Fields: Medicine & Surgery
- Workplaces: Mayo Clinic

William James Mayo (June 29, 1861 – July 28, 1939) was a physician and surgeon in the United States and one of the seven founders of the Mayo Clinic. He and his brother, Charles Horace Mayo, both joined their father's private medical practice in Rochester, Minnesota, after graduating from medical school in the 1880s. In 1919, that practice became the not-for-profit Mayo Clinic.

Augustus Stinchfield was also asked to join the medical practice in 1892 by William Worrall Mayo. Once Stinchfield was hired, W. W. Mayo retired at age 73. Others who were invited to be part of the enterprise were C. Graham, E. Starr Judd, Henry Stanley Plummer, Melvin Millet and Donald Balfour.

== Early years ==
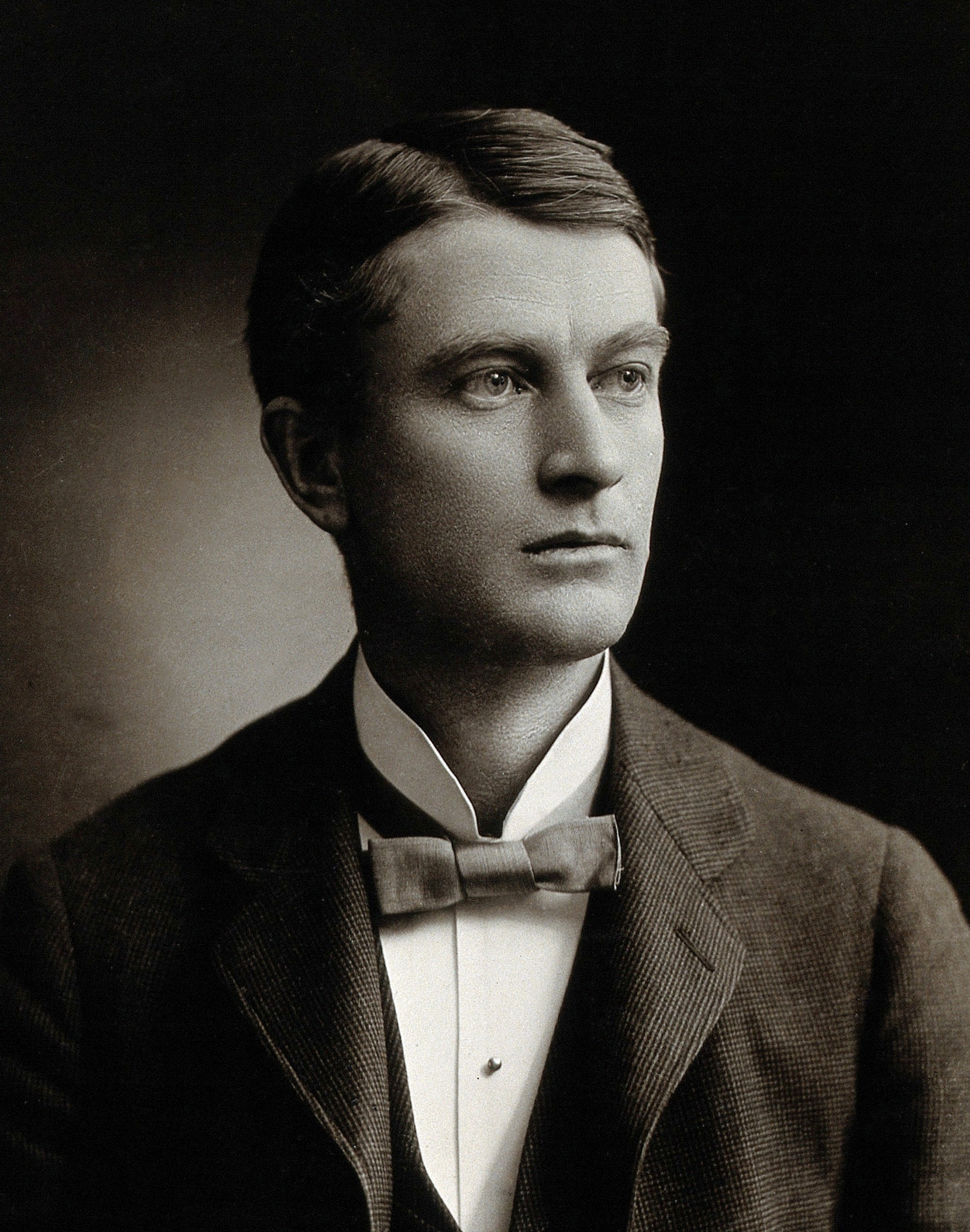
William James Mayo

William James Mayo was born to William Worrall Mayo and his wife Louise in Le Sueur, Minnesota, in his parents' home. As a child, William and his brother Charles frequently accompanied their father as he went about his business as a pioneer physician. They began by helping out with very menial tasks, and were gradually given more responsibility. Eventually, the boys were administering anesthesia and tying off blood vessels.

One night at the age of 16, Will accompanied his father to an abandoned hotel where one of the elder Mayo's patients worked as the caretaker. The patient had just died and Mayo was going to perform an autopsy. Will stood by and watched the procedure and after about an hour, it was time to go to another patient's home. Mayo asked his son to stay behind and clean up. "Sew up the incisions and then tuck the sheet around the corpse. When you finish, go right home." Will nervously began to stitch up the incisions on the body and recounted the incident many years later saying, "I'm about as proud of the fact that I walked out of there, instead of ran, as of anything else I ever made myself do".

== Education and career ==
Mayo earned his medical degree at the University of Michigan Medical School in 1883, where he became a founder of Nu Sigma Nu Medical Fraternity. Afterwards he returned to Rochester to practice medicine alongside his father and his brother Charles.

On August 21, 1883, a tornado struck Rochester, killing 29 people and seriously injuring over 55 others. One-third of the town was destroyed, but young Will and his family escaped serious harm. The relief efforts began immediately with a temporary hospital being established at the town's dance hall. The Mayo brothers were extensively involved in treating the injured who were brought there for help. Mother Alfred Moes and the Sisters of Saint Francis were called in to act as nurses (despite the fact they were trained as teachers and had little if any medical experience).

After the crisis had subsided, Mother Alfred Moes approached William Worrall Mayo about establishing a hospital in Rochester. On September 30, 1889, Saint Mary's Hospital opened. W.W. Mayo, 70 years old, became the consulting physician and surgeon at the hospital, and his two sons began seeing patients and performing surgery with the assistance of the Sisters of Saint Francis.

== Personal life and death ==
William J. Mayo married Hattie Marie Damon (1864–1952) in 1884. They had 5 children, two of whom survived infancy. Carrie born in 1887 and Pheobe in 1897 both married physicians at the Mayo Clinic.

He died in July 1939 of gastric carcinoma (stomach cancer) in Rochester, Minnesota. That type of tumor had been a major focus of his surgical practice. Mayo is buried with his family members near his parents and brother at Oakwood Cemetery in Rochester.

The United States Postal Service printed a stamp depicting him and his brother, Charles Horace Mayo, on September 11, 1964.

Will's father and his brother Charles H. Mayo were prominent Freemasons of the Grand Lodge of Minnesota, and members of Rochester Lodge #21. Will petitioned the lodge but his medical practice and time with his family did not allow him the time to join the fraternity.

The Dr. William J. Mayo House in Rochester is listed on the U.S. National Register of Historic Places.

== Military service ==
William J. Mayo served in World War I at the rank of colonel (O6), as chief adviser for U.S. Army surgical services in the office of the U.S. Army Surgeon General. His brother Charles was also a Colonel in the U.S. Army Medical Corps and alternated with William as the associate chief adviser for surgical care of U.S. Army soldiers. When President Woodrow Wilson organized the Committee of American Physicians for Medical Preparedness in 1916, William was named its chairman and Charles as one of its members. That committee subsequently became the General Medical Board of the Council for National Defense. William was made a member of its executive committee and Charles was his alternate.

During World War I, the Mayo Clinic continued to be busy. Many draftees were examined and war training classes were conducted for new physicians in the medical corps. William and Charles designed courses to educate military doctors on the latest scientific and surgical developments. The two brothers divided their time between Rochester and their duties in Washington, D.C. so that one of them would always be at the Clinic. This schedule took a toll on their health; Charles contracted pneumonia during one of his stints in Washington, and William developed hepatitis while in Rochester in 1918.

After hostilities ended in November 1918, both of the Mayo brothers were promoted to the rank of brigadier general (O7) in the U.S. Army Reserve. In addition, they both received the U.S. Distinguished Service Medal for their wartime service to the country.

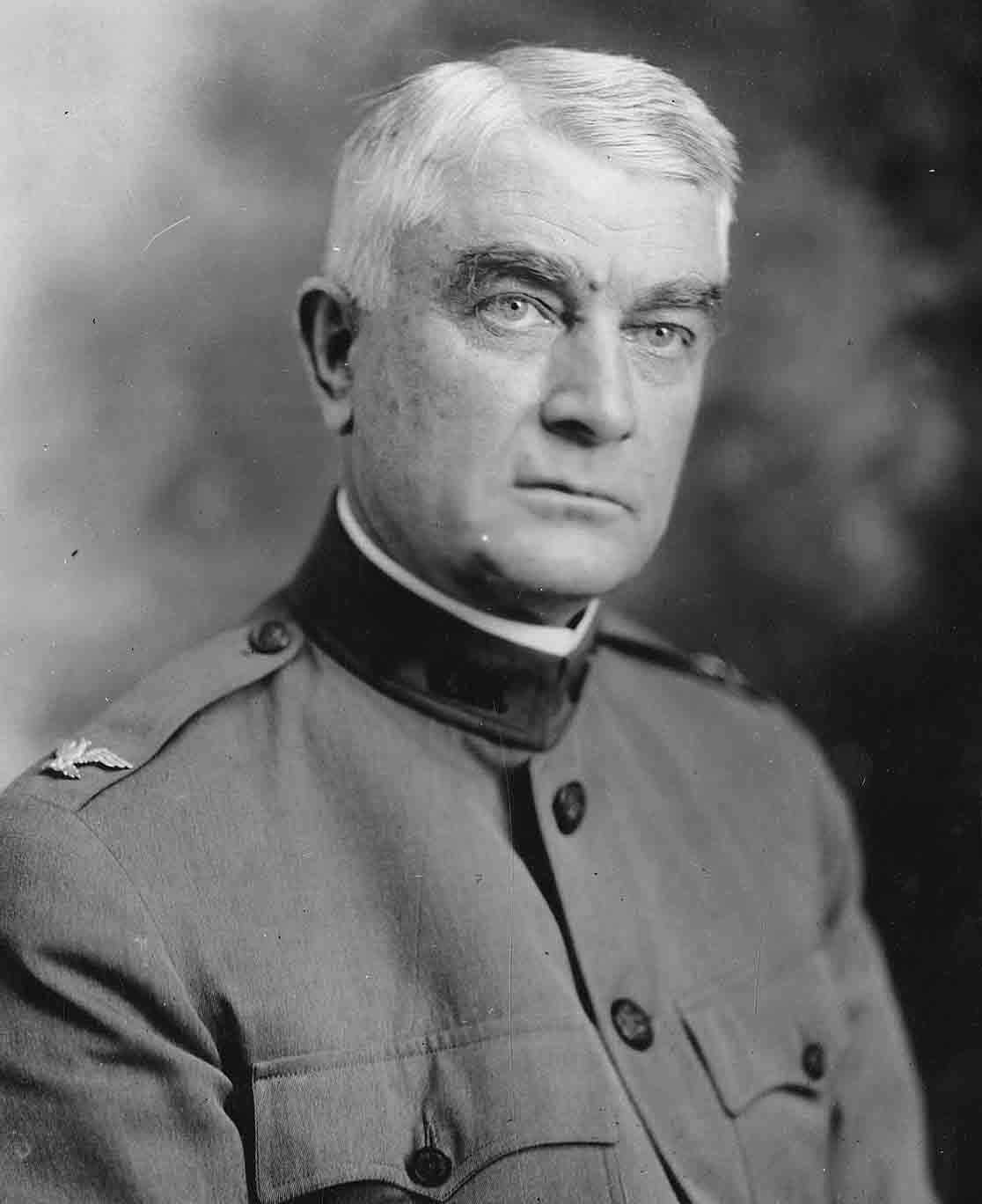
William J. Mayo as a colonel in the U.S. Army Medical Corps, 1917

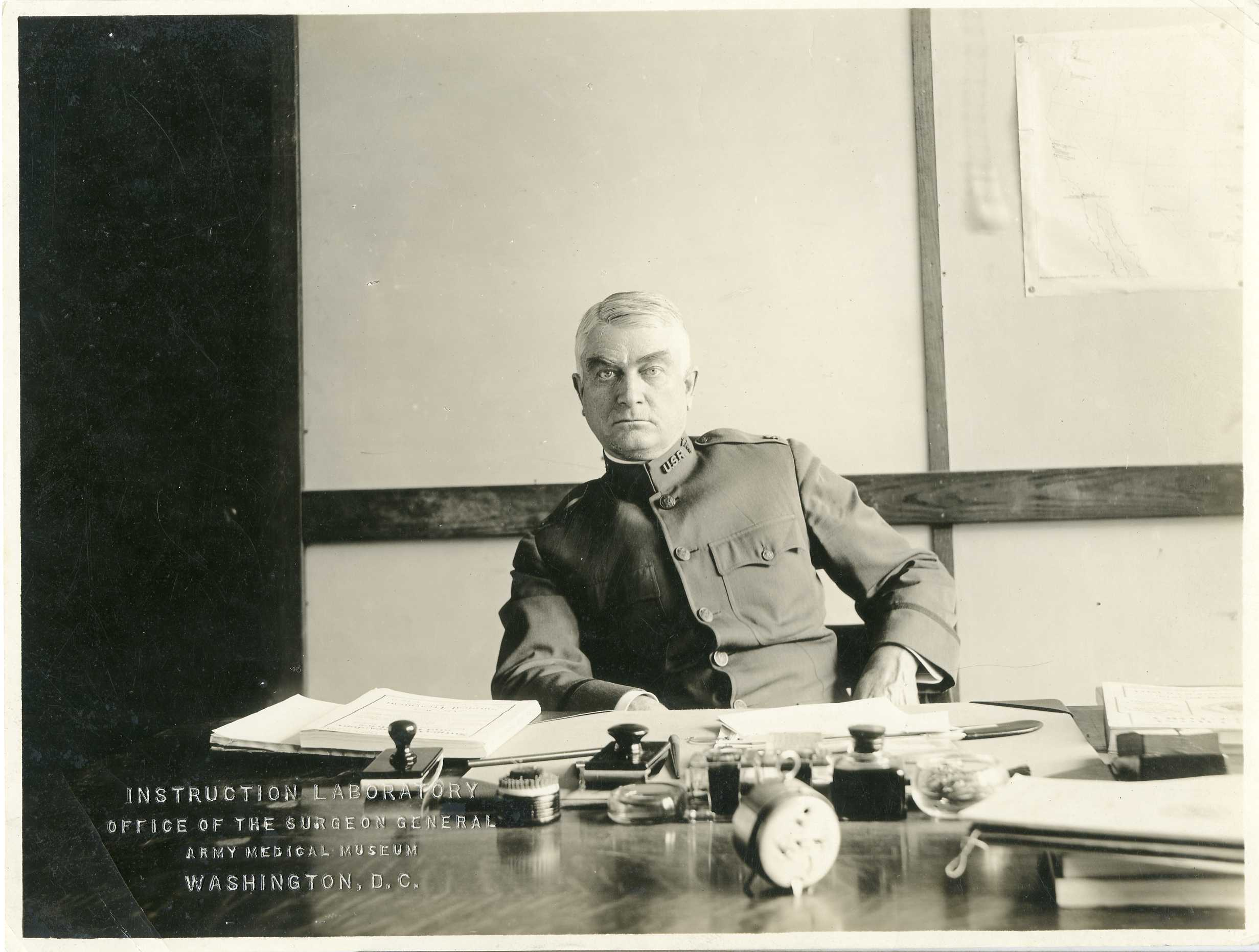
Mayo as a major in the Medical Corps

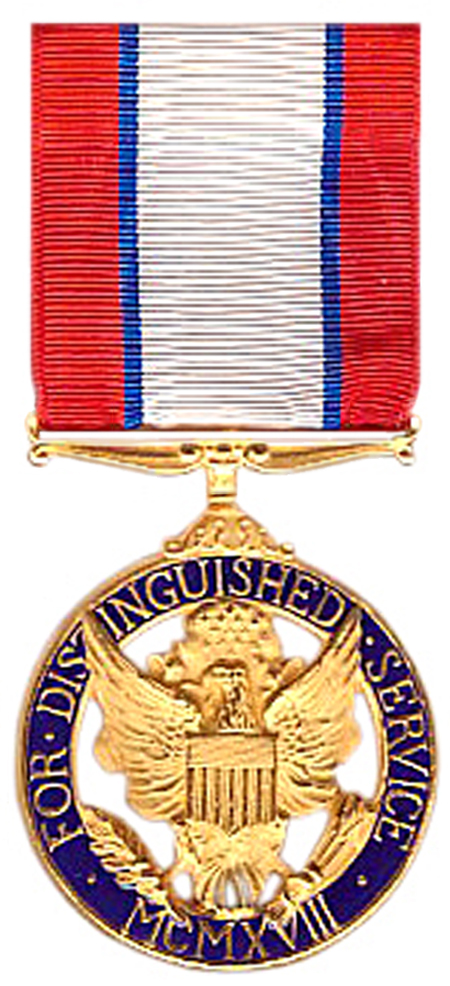
U.S. Distinguished Service Medal

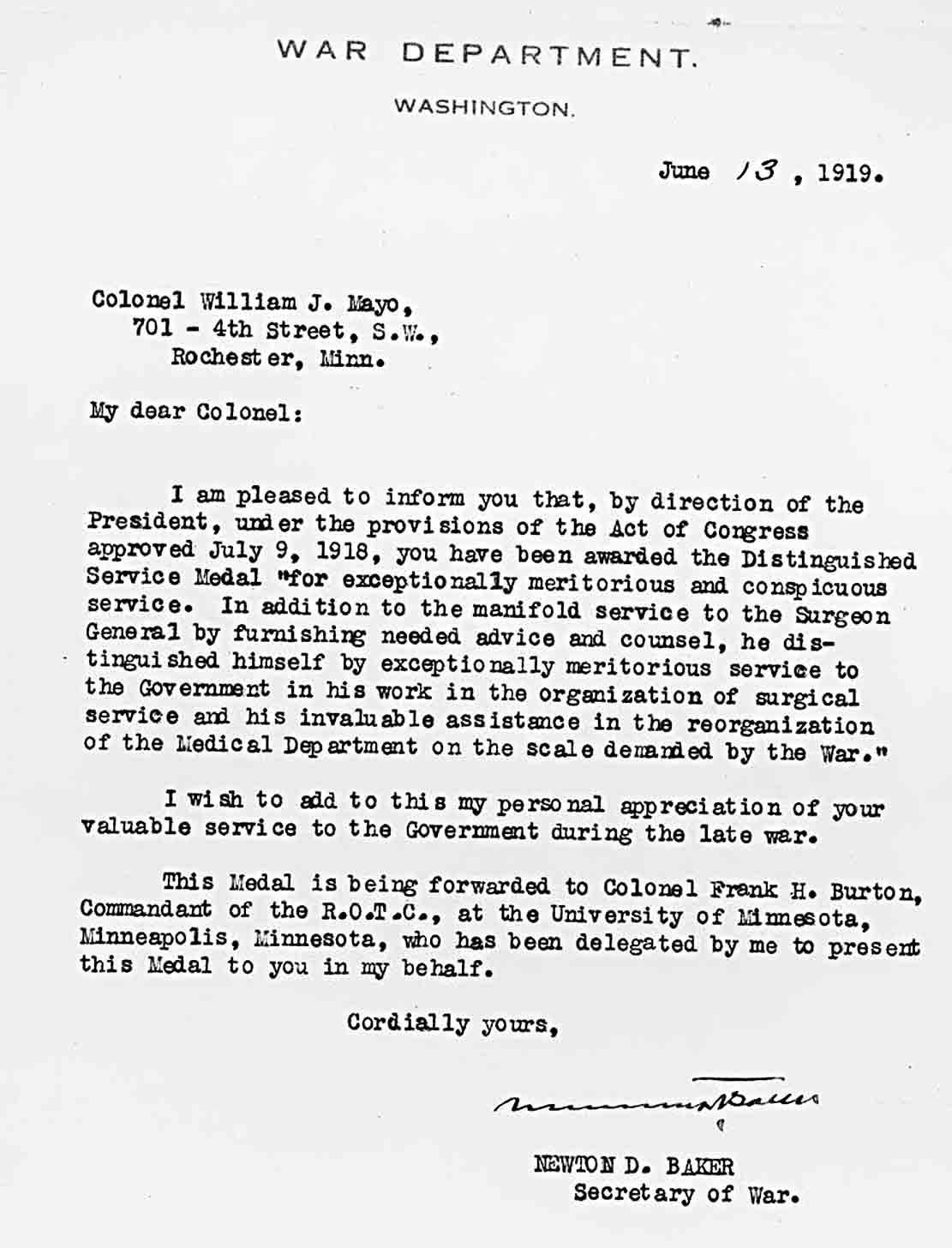
Letter from U.S. War Department to William Mayo for Distinguished Service Medal

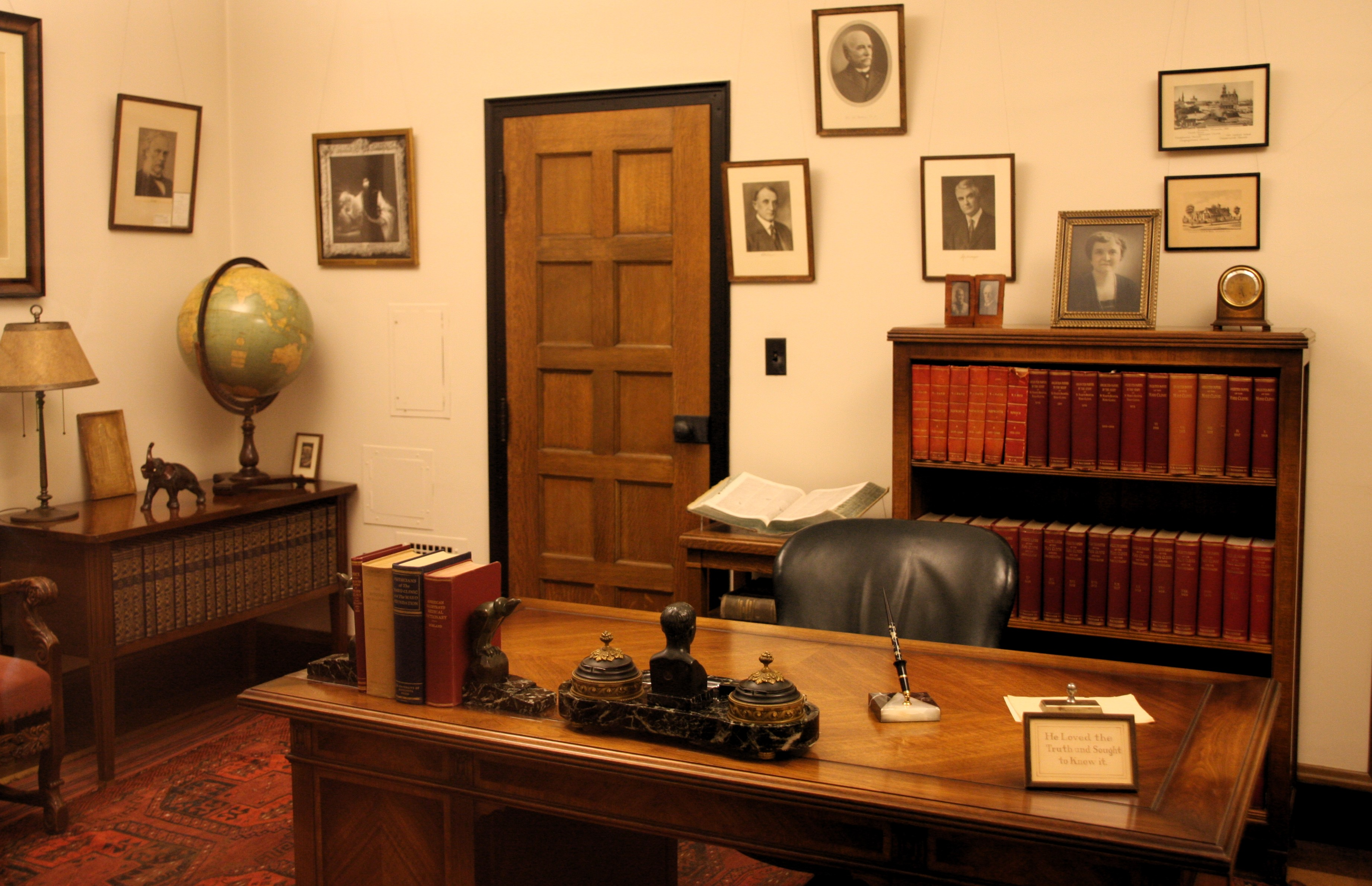
William James Mayo's last office in the Plummer Building, as it was during his lifetime.

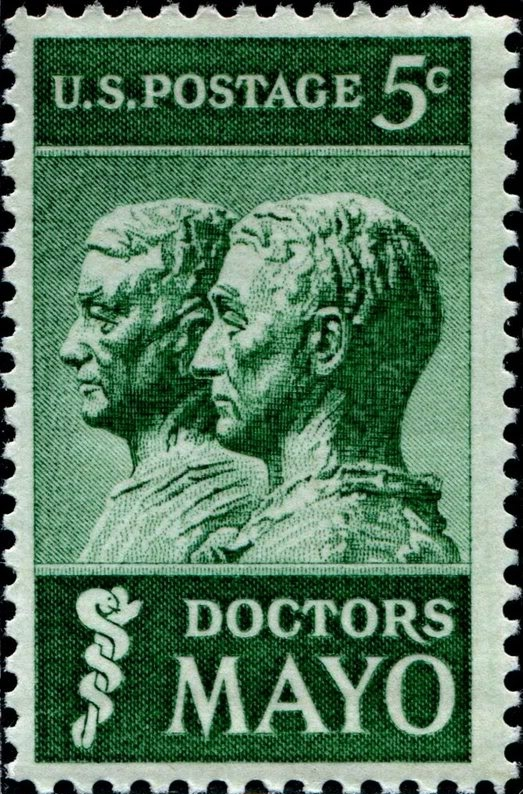
Doctors Mayo stamp

== Predictions ==
In September 1931, Mayo and other prominent individuals of the time were invited by The New York Times to make a prediction concerning the world in eighty years time in the future, in 2011, to celebrate the paper's hundred-and-sixtieth anniversary since its establishment in 1851. Mayo's prediction was that the life expectancy of developed countries would reach 70 years, compared to less than sixty years in 1931.

Contagious and infectious diseases have been largely overcome, and the average length of life of man has increased to fifty-eight years. The great causes of death in middle and later life are diseases of heart, blood vessels and kidneys, diseases of the nervous system, and cancer. The progress that is being made would suggest that within the measure of time for this forecast the average life time of civilized man would be raised to the biblical term of three-score and ten.

"Three-score and ten" means 70 years. The average life expectancy in the United States was approximately 78 years as of 2010, and it exceeded 80 years in other countries such as Japan.
