= List of people from Rochester, Minnesota =

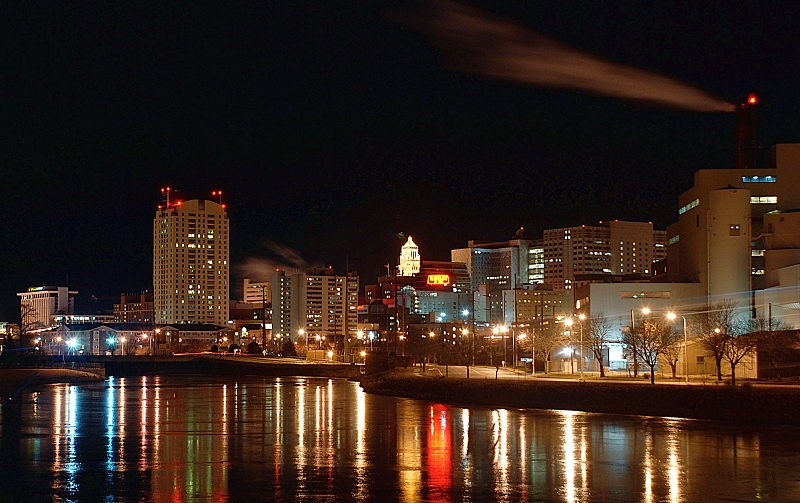
Rochester skyline at twilight

This is a list of people who were born or lived in Rochester, Minnesota.

== Arts, media and music ==
- José Argüelles, author, artist
- Dan Bakkedahl, actor, comedian
- Michele Carey, actress
- SungWon Cho, voice actor and YouTuber
- Darius Danesh, singer, songwriter, musician, actor, film producer
- Amanda Hocking, author
- Judy Onofrio, artist
- Johnny Pemberton, actor
- Emily Sandberg, model and actress
- Warren Skaaren, screenplay writer, producer
- Lea Thompson, actress
- John Towey, actor
- Sheree J. Wilson, actress
- Michael York, actor
- Yung Gravy (Matt Hauri), rapper

== Science and medicine ==
- Luis Walter Alvarez, winner of Nobel Prize for Physics 1968
- Harry Bisel, physician
- Sara C. Bisel, physical anthropologist
- Philip Showalter Hench, winner of Nobel Prize for Medicine 1950
- Edward Calvin Kendall, winner of Nobel Prize for Medicine 1950
- Charles Horace Mayo, physician
- William James Mayo, physician
- William Worrall Mayo, physician
- Henry Stanley Plummer, physician
- Augustus Stinchfield, physician
- Michael Stuart, physician and orthopedic surgeon
- Albert Szent-Györgyi, winner of Nobel Prize for Medicine 1937

== Law and politics ==
- Adolph Biermann, Minnesota state suditor
- Harry Blackmun, associate justice of the United States Supreme Court
- Walter Burdick, Minnesota farmer and legislator
- Michael C. Burgess, congressman
- Marshall Burt, Wyoming legislator, first member of the Libertarian Party to be elected to a legislature in over 20 years
- Barbara Cegavske, secretary of state of Nevada, former Nevada legislator
- Kerry Conley, Minnesota legislator and businessman
- Robert Rankin Dunlap, Minnesota lawyer and legislator
- John Moonan Fitzgerald, Minnesota jurist and legislator
- John Formella, Attorney General of New Hampshire
- Donald T. Franke, Minnesota jurist and legislator
- Don Frerichs, Minnesota legislator and businessman
- Allen John Furlow, Minnesota congressman, lawyer, and World War I veteran
- Julie Anne Genter, member of the New Zealand House of Representatives representing the Green Party of Aotearoa New Zealand
- Gil Gutknecht, member of Congress
- Stiles P. Jones, Minnesota state senator and lawyer
- John R. Kaley, Minnesota state representative and businessman
- Sandy Keith, lt. governor and state supreme court chief justice
- Frank B. Kellogg, U.S. secretary of state and winner of Nobel Peace Prize 1929
- Harold G. Krieger. Minnesota state senator and judge
- Gordon Moore, associate justice of the Minnesota Supreme Court
- Leilani Munter, stock car driver
- Carla Nelson, incumbent Minnesota state senator and former member of the Minnesota House of Representatives
- Richard Ojeda, member of the West Virginia Senate, candidate in the 2020 Democratic Party presidential primaries
- Edward Henry Ozmun, Minnesota lawyer, politician, and diplomat
- John Parkin, Wisconsin legislator
- John M. Peters, Iowa lawyer and legislator
- Mark Piepho, Minnesota legislator and businessman
- Nels Pierson, Minnesota legislator
- E. William Quirin, Minnesota legislator and businessman
- Dave Senjem, former majority leader of the Minnesota Senate, former minority leader of the Minnesota Senate
- Ozora P. Stearns, U.S. senator and mayor of Rochester
- Ken Zubay, Minnesota legislator and businessman

== Sports ==
- Mark Abboud, soccer player
- Rafael Butler, boxer
- Eric Butorac, tennis player
- Tyler Cain, basketball player
- Chris Chike, Esports athlete
- Phil DuBois, football player
- John Fina, football player
- Robert W. Fleming, Olympic hockey leader and Mayo Clinic executive
- Guy Gosselin, hockey player
- Matthew Hurt, basketball player
- Sada Jacobson (born 1983), Olympic fencing silver and bronze medalist
- Jim Johannson (1964–2018), ice hockey player, coach and executive
- John Johannson, ice hockey player
- Ken Johannson (1930–2018), Canadian-born American ice hockey player, coach and executive
- Dick Kimball, diving coach
- Bryce Lampman, hockey player
- Bethanie Mattek-Sands, tennis player
- Coco Miller, basketball player
- Scott Muller, canoer
- Shjon Podein, hockey player
- John Pohl, hockey player
- Michael Restovich, baseball player
- Bob Schmidt, football player
- Aaron Senne, baseball player
- Marcus Sherels, football player
- Jeff Siemon, football player
- Tommy Speer, fighter
- Eric Strobel, hockey player
- Colin Stuart, hockey player
- Mark Stuart, hockey player
- Mike Stuart, hockey player
- Darrell Thompson, football player
- Ben Utecht, football player
- Doug Zmolek, hockey player
- Raphaël Collignon, tennis player

== Other ==
- Michael A. Fitzgerald, entrepreneur and author
- Fred Hargesheimer, pilot, philanthropist
- John Jeremiah Lawler, Roman Catholic bishop
- Mary Alfred Moes, Roman Catholic nun
- Curt Rice, Norwegian linguist and rector of the Norwegian University of Life Sciences
- Sarah Burger Stearns, co-founder and first president of the Minnesota Woman Suffrage Association
- Igor Vovkovinskiy, tallest man in U.S.
