= Conley–Maass Building =

- Maass and McAndrew Company Building
- U.S. National Register of Historic Places
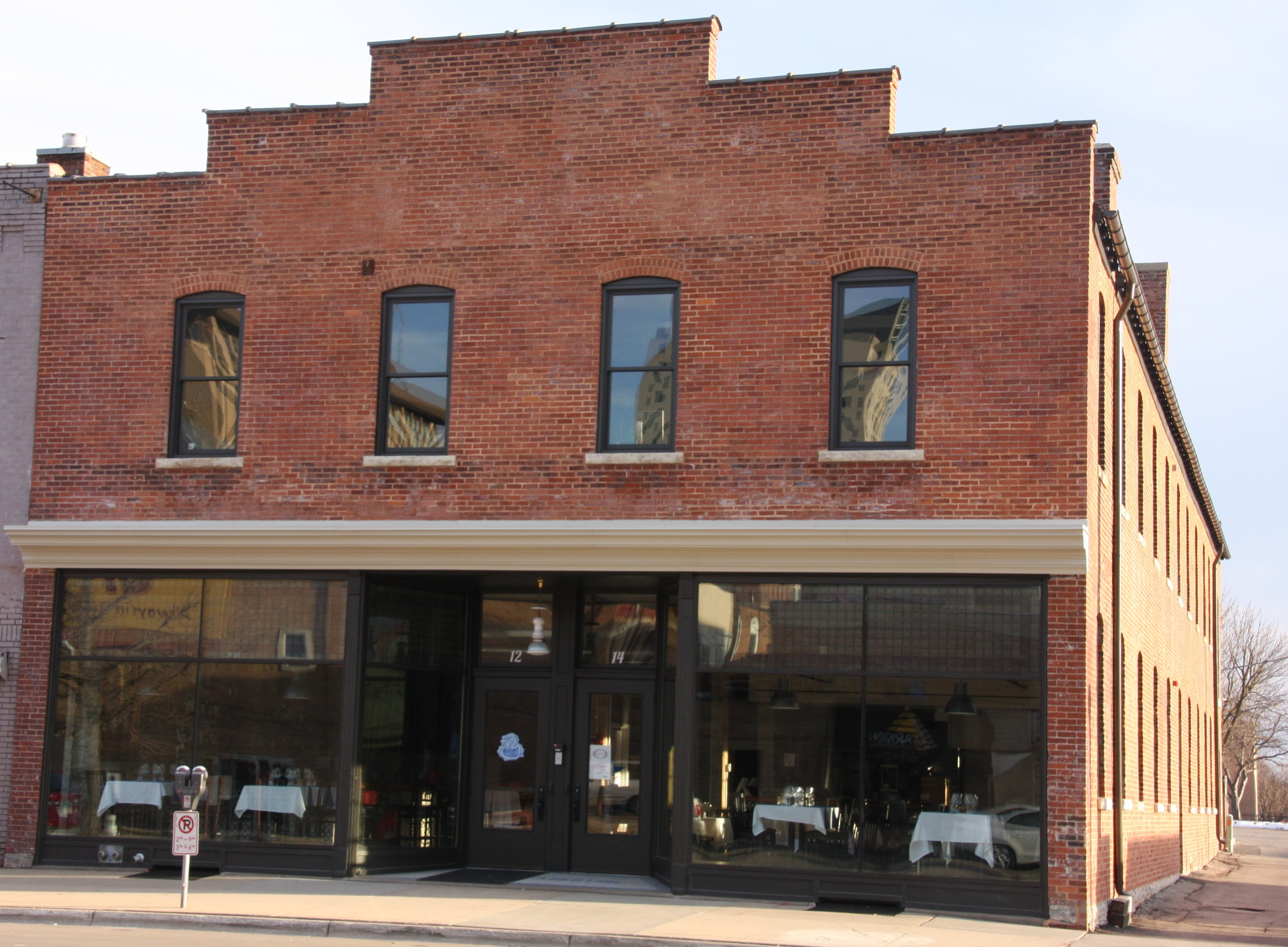
- The building in 2017

- Location within Minnesota
- Interactive map showing Conley-Mass’ location
- Location: 12-14 Fourth Street, S.W., Rochester, Minnesota
- Coordinates: 44°1′9″N 92°27′49″W
- Built: 1900
- NRHP reference No.: 16000278
- Added to NRHP: May 24, 2016

The Conley–Maass–Downs Building, also called the Maass and McAndrew Company Building, is one of the oldest remaining commercial buildings in Rochester, Minnesota.

== History ==
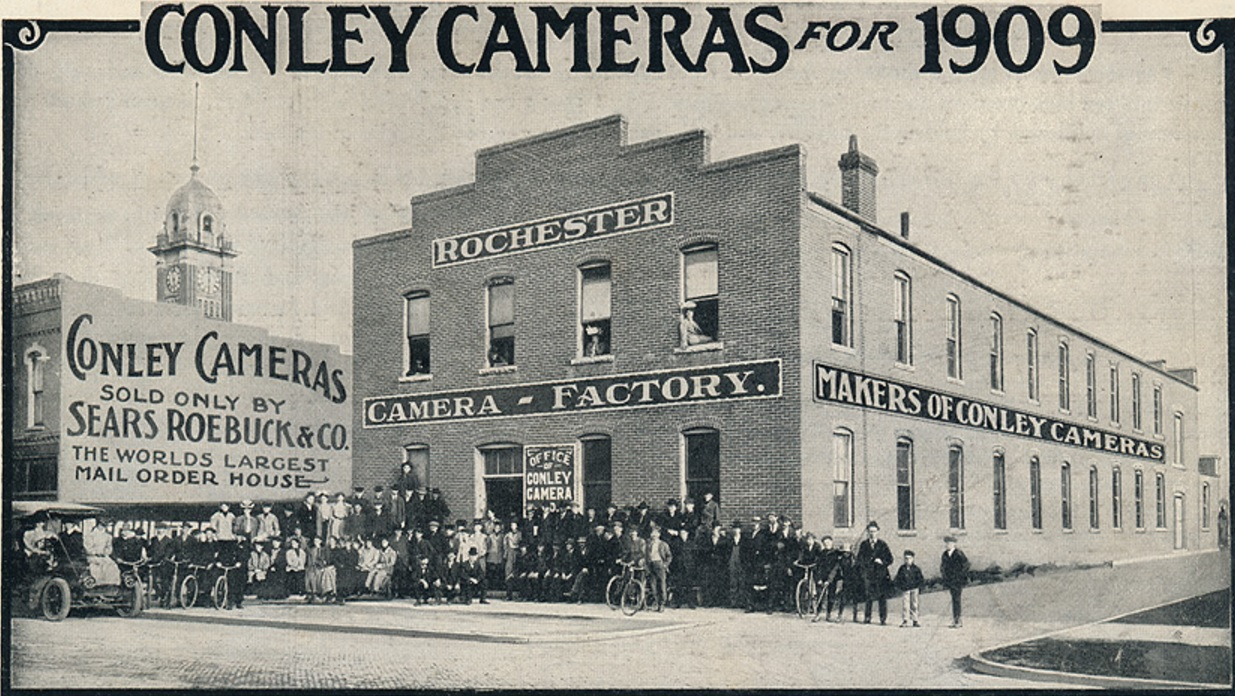
The building in the 1908 Sears catalog

Originally built in 1900 by the Rochester Woolen Mill Co to produce pants made from wool fabric from their mill. The woolen mill company went bankrupt in 1903, and the factory was purchased by the Conley Camera Company (established by Kerry Conley and his brother Fred) in 1904.

The Conley company and the building were featured in the 1908 Sears catalog. They remained until 1909 when they moved to a larger facility on the north side of Rochester.

Maass & McAndrew Plumbing and Heating purchased the building in 1910 and occupied it until 1955. Maass & McAndrew did much work for the Mayo Clinic and one of the family members, Frederic Maass, worked with Henry Stanley Plummer in designing the Plummer Building and later became Chief Engineer at Mayo.

It has also housed the Fraternal Order of Eagles, Veterans of Foreign Wars, the Loyal Order of Moose, The Salvation Army, Rochester Ballet School, Masque Theatre, and Words Players.

In 2016, the new owners Hunter and Traci Downs undertook a $2.2 million restoration project. The main level houses a restaurant called Bleu Duck Kitchen and the upper-level houses commercial office space. In 2021, Google announced occupancy within one of the commercial office spaces - marking the first Google location in Minnesota.
