= Kerry Conley =

American politician

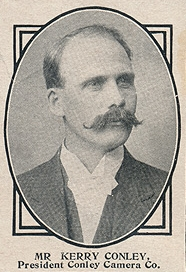
Kerry Conley

Kerry Ellsworth Conley (1 September 1866 – 5 March 1924) was Minnesota businessman, civic leader, and politician.

Together with his brother Fred, they founded the Conley Camera Company in Spring Valley, Minnesota at 510 Main Street. The brothers were childhood friends with Richard Sears, and the company secured a contract to sell cameras through Sears, Roebuck, Inc. catalogs. To help fill the increased demand, as well as being able to advertised the cameras as "Made in Rochester" in an attempt to associate their cameras with Kodak, they moved the business to Rochester, Minnesota in 1904 and purchased a factory. The production soon expanded and they built a larger factory in 1910. The Conley brothers eventually sold their company to Sears.

Kerry Conley served in a number of political offices, including the Minnesota State House of Representatives. He also owned The Hotel Arthur with Arthur C Gooding in Rochester, which was designed by his son Walter Conley. Kerry later owned a company which produced cut glass windows. Kerry died unexpectedly from a heart attack while playing volleyball at the local YMCA.

About 1909, he built an American Foursquare style home designed to showcase many examples of ornate glass and woodwork, which stood until 2014. The former factory still stands at 14 Fourth Street SW in Rochester.
