= Reading Public Library =

Coordinates: 40°20′0.5″N 75°55′42.0″W

- Reading Public Library, main branch, built 1913
- Location: Reading, Pennsylvania, USA
- Established: 1763
- Branches: 1 Main Branch, 3 Sub Branches, 1 Bookmobile

Access and use
- Circulation: 500,000
- Population served: 87,812 (City of Reading); 415,000 (Berks County)

Other information
- Budget: $2.9M
- Director: Melissa Adams
- Employees: 60
- Website: http://www.readingpubliclibrary.org

The Reading Public Library (RPL) is the main public library of the City of Reading, Pennsylvania and the district library center (DLC) of Berks County. RPL's services and collections serve the City of Reading, its suburbs, greater Berks County, and beyond.

== History ==
Founded as an English subscription library in 1763, Reading Public Library is one of the oldest, though not continuously operating, libraries in the United States. It wasn't until 1913 that the Main Library as it currently stands was built through the generosity of Andrew Carnegie. After a major fundraising campaign in 1989, the Main Library was renovated and modernized through a variety of projects during 1990–1993. It is the sixth oldest public library in the United States.

== Recognition by IMLS ==
In May 2018, Reading Public Library was selected as a recipient of the National Medal for Museum and Library Service by the Institute of Museum and Library Services. This award represents institutions that offer "dynamic programming and services that exceed expected levels of service" and that also "bring about change that touches the lives of individuals and helps communities thrive" through outreach to and engagement with the service population.

== Branch Libraries ==
An increase in the number of users and the changing collection needs over the years have prompted the construction of three Branches. Southeast Branch Library (1974), Northeast Branch Library (1974), and Northwest Branch Library (1939). City Bookmobile services were added in 1951. The Main Library, all three Branches, and the Bookmobile readily share books and other materials to further facilitate complete coverage of the community's needs.

== Website ==
Postcard of the library, date unknown

The Reading Public Library website provides access to the library's catalog and to online collections and subscription databases. It also includes information on upcoming events such as free book talks, instruction sessions, and visiting speakers and authors.

In conjunction with Access Pennsylvania, RPL gives library cardholders free access via POWER Library to hundreds of current and historical magazines, newspapers, journals, and reference books in subscription databases, including EBSCOhost, Grove Art Online, Grove Music Online, and ERIC.

== Resources and services ==
=== Resources ===
RPL offers a wide variety of print resources (Fiction, Nonfiction, Reference, Large Print, Spanish, Magazines, Government Documents) and non-print resources (CDs, CD-ROMs, DVDs, Video Cassettes, Microfilm, Databases, Reading Eagle Archives).

=== Services ===
Among RPL's many services are a fully staffed Reference Department, Inter-Library Loan capabilities, a Pennsylvania Room dedicated to history and genealogy of the local area, award-winning Children's Young Adult Departments, regularly scheduled Instruction & Programming, and freely available Public Internet Access via desktop computers and wifi).

== See also ==
- Pennsylvania Department of Education
  - Office of Commonwealth Libraries
- Access Pennsylvania (Union catalog of Pennsylvania's school, public, academic and special libraries)
- POWER Library (Databases available to Pennsylvania library members)
- State Library of Pennsylvania
- List of Berks County Libraries
