= Rochester Public Library (Minnesota) =

Coordinates: 44.021930°N 92.460900°W

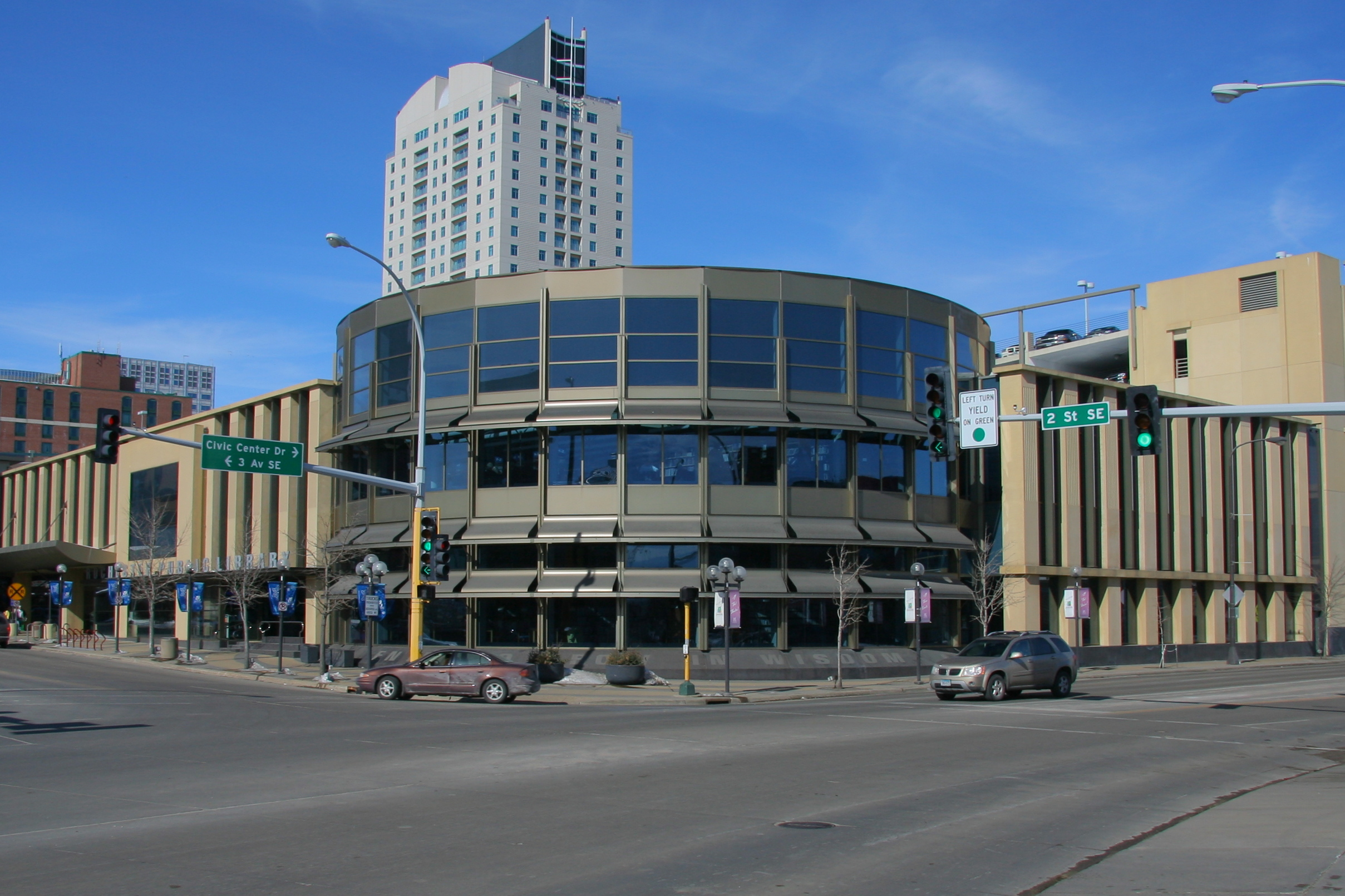
- Rochester Public Library
- Location: 101 2nd Street SE; Rochester, Minnesota 55904-3776
- Established: 1895; 131 years ago

Other information
- Director: Karen Lemke [started March 2022]
- Public transit access: RPT
- Website: http://www.rplmn.org

The Rochester Public Library is a library in Rochester, Minnesota. It is a member of Southeastern Libraries Cooperating, the southeast Minnesota library region. It is the largest public library in an 11-county consortium.

== National Medal ==
In May 2018, Rochester Public Library was given the National Medal for Museum and Library Service, the highest honor for institutions that make significant and exceptional contributions to their communities. It was one of only five libraries nationally to receive this distinction.

== History ==
In 1895, the Rochester Public Library was officially established, led by local attorney Burt W. Eaton. A local library society was confirmed by the city council on April 29, 1895. The library was first set up in the City Hall building, and by the end of that year it contained 10,744 volumes (according to its first-ever Annual Report). In 1966, a bookmobile service was created, holding 5,000 volumes at a cost of about $22,000. The current Library location opened on October 4, 1995.

The library routinely organize several events for the public which routinely includes Book Club, Origami club, Writers Club, Movie night, and several art classes for the kids.

One Sunday, September 22, 2019, the library's water heater broke, spilling thousands of gallons throughout the building from the third floor mechanical space. Restoration of the infrastructure was almost complete in March 2020 when the library closed due to the COVID-19 pandemic. The library started opening seven days a week, year round, starting in June 2021.

== Bike Share Program ==
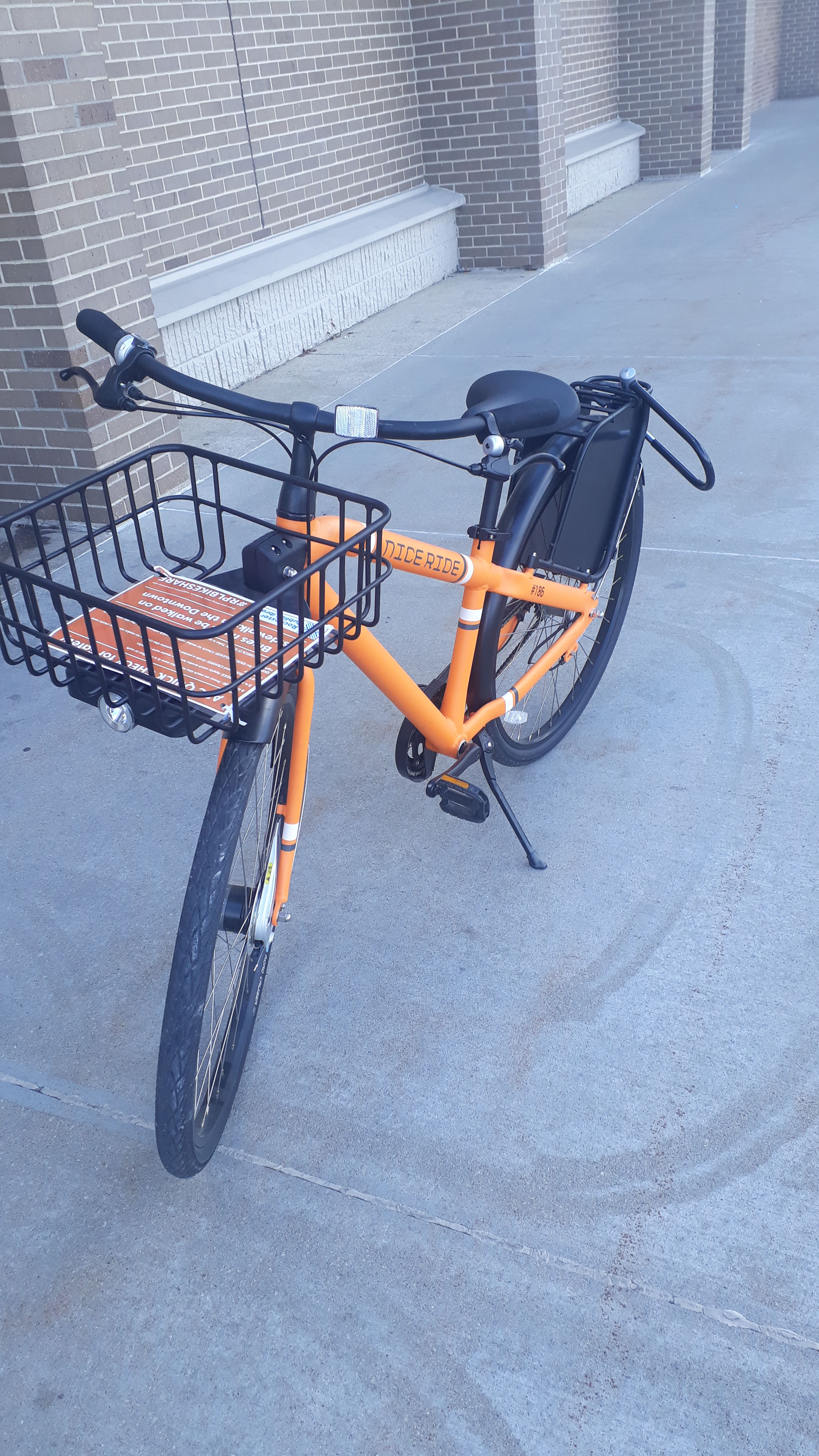
Bike share bike

Rochester Public Library offers Bike share program for its members and visitors to borrow the bike for a day or week. In 2019, RPL has also started electric cargo bike. This service was discontinued after the 2022 season.
