= Nashville Public Library =

Library system in Tennessee, US

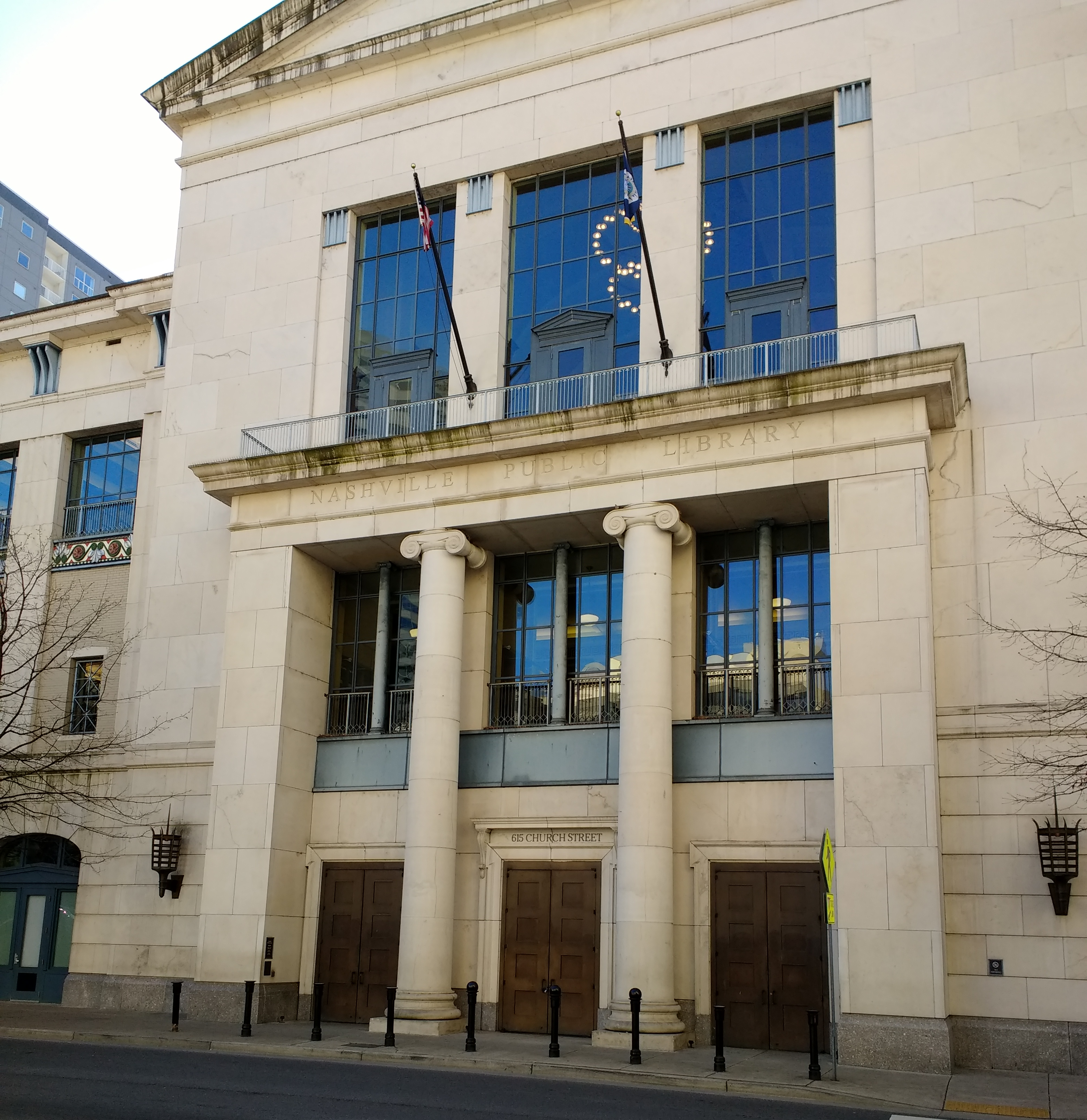
- Main Library in 2017
- 36.1621°N 86.7817°W
- Location: Nashville, Tennessee, United States
- Type: Public library
- Established: 1901
- Branches: Main Library, 20 Branches, Metropolitan Government Archives of Davidson County, Talking Library

Access and use
- Population served: 1.5 million (Davidson County)

Other information
- Budget: 32,080,600
- Director: Terri Luke (Interim)
- Employees: 366
- Website: https://library.nashville.org

Nashville Public Library (NPL) is the public library system serving Nashville, Tennessee and the metropolitan area of Davidson County. In 2010, the Nashville Public Library was the recipient of the National Medal for Museum and Library Service. The library was named the Gale/Library Journal 2017 Library of the Year.

== History ==
A succession of public libraries, known by a variety of names, served the people of Nashville. The early libraries were generally small, offered a narrow range of services, and operated on a fee schedule. In 1897, the Tennessee General Assembly authorized cities of a certain size to establish and maintain free public libraries and reading rooms. With this authority, in 1901 the Howard Library became Nashville’s first free circulating library. Also in 1901, Andrew Carnegie offered to donate $100,000 for a new library building if the city would take care of its maintenance. The city accepted those terms, and in 1904, the Carnegie Library Building was completed on Polk Avenue. Andrew Carnegie enabled the building and opening of an additional three branches between 1912 and 1919. Two buildings are still in use today, the North Branch and the East Branch.

The Carnegie Library Building was razed and replaced with the Ben West Public Library in 1963. The Main Library was housed in the Ben West building for 38 years.

The new Main Library Building, designed by Robert A.M. Stern Architects, was opened in 2001. Previously on the site for the Main Library was a downtown shopping mall called Church Street Center.

Beginning in the 1940s, bookmobiles were used across Davidson County. Their extensive routes reached many residents, including those living in rural areas. The first bookmobile was formed by the Library State Project in 1941. In 1947, the Nashville Public Library created its bookmobile known as "library-on-wheels". It made weekly rounds throughout the county until the program ended in 2008.

=== Segregation ===
In 1912, Andrew Carnegie offered another $50,000 to the Nashville City Council for the creation of two new library branches: one for white residents and the other for African-Americans. At the time, Nashville's library only allowed African-Americans to check out books from bookmobiles. Carnegie had previously donated $20,000 to construct the first library at Fisk University, known today as the Carnegie Academic Building.

The Negro Branch of the Carnegie Library (later the Negro Branch of the Nashville Public Library) opened in 1916. At the time, about a third of the city's population was African-American. It was one of the few libraries in the South that rendered library services to African-Americans. The library closed in 1949, years before Nashville desegregated its libraries.

The Hadley Park Branch Library opened in 1952 and was built to serve the African-American community. It continues to serve a predominantly African-American population today.

== Branches ==
There are 20 library branches in the Nashville Public Library system. They are:

- Bellevue Branch Library
- Bordeaux Branch Library
- Donelson Branch Library
- East Branch Library
- Edgehill Branch Library
- Edmondson Pike Branch Library
- Goodlettsville Branch Library
- Green Hills Branch Library
- Hadley Park Branch Library
- Hermitage Branch Library
- Inglewood Branch Library
- Looby Branch Library
- Madison Branch Library
- North Branch Library
- Old Hickory Branch Library
- Pruitt Branch Library
- Richland Park Branch Library
- Southeast Branch Library
- Thompson Lane Branch Library
- Watkins Park Branch Library

== Programs and services ==
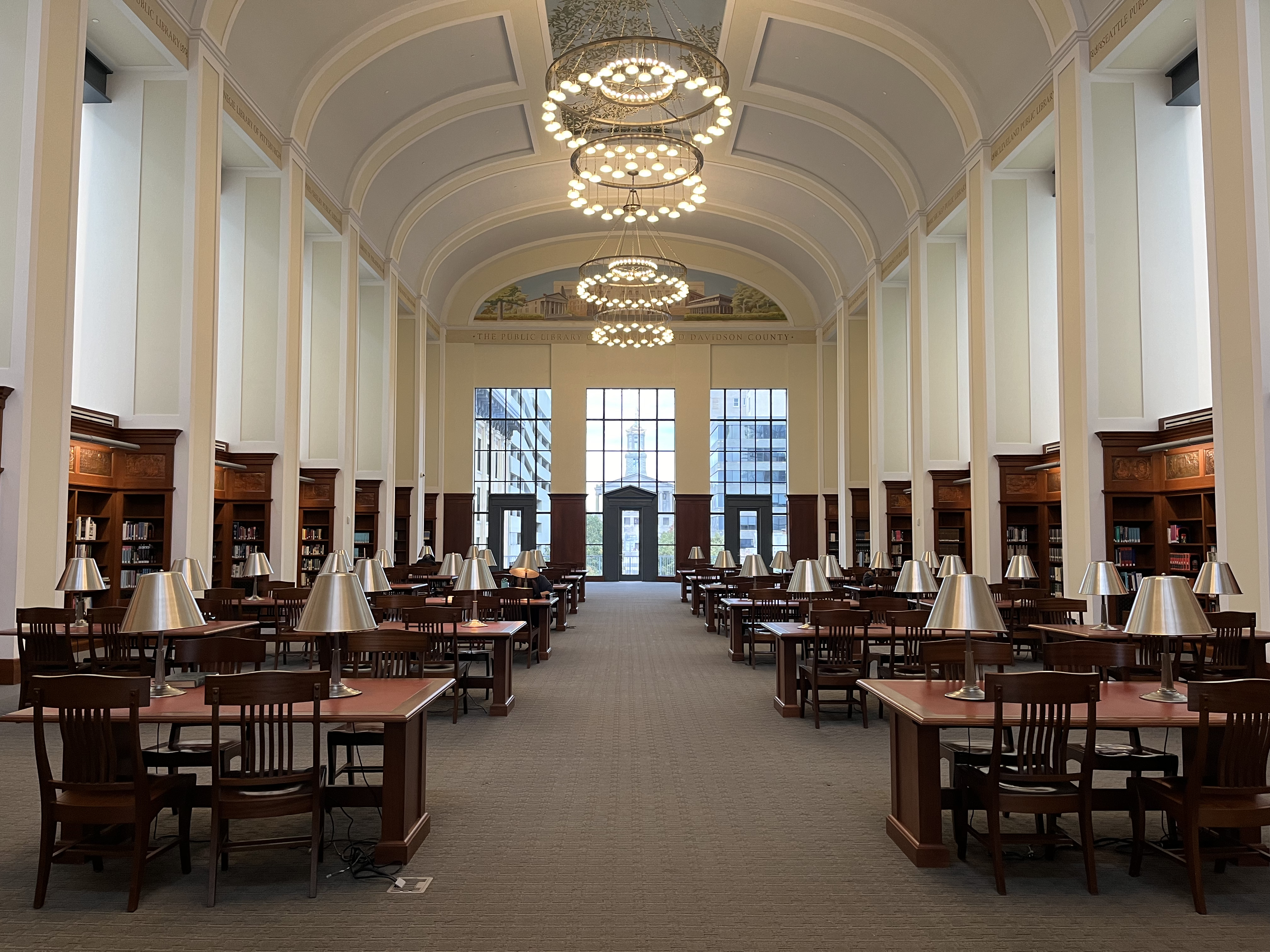
Main library reading room in 2023

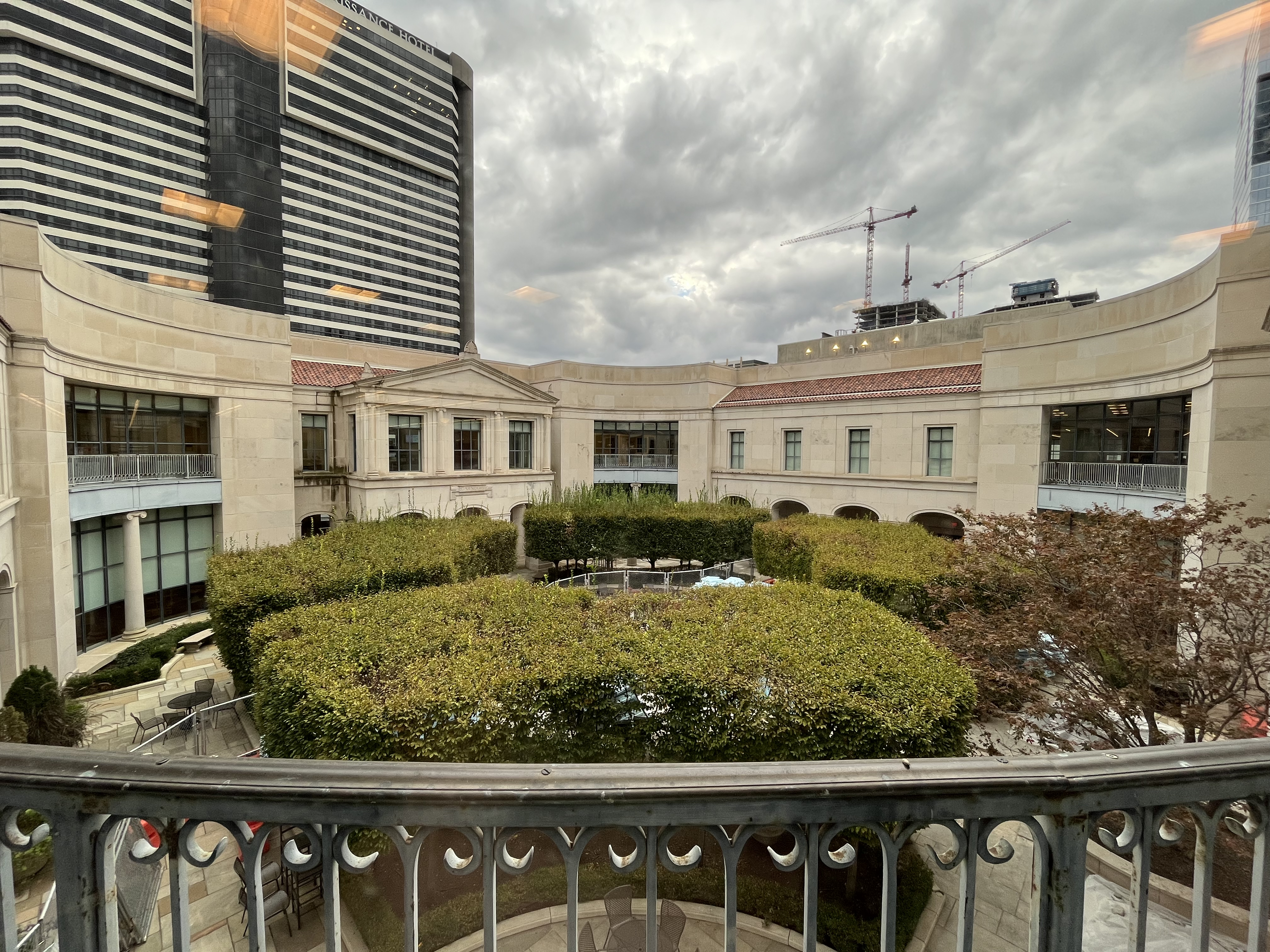
Main library courtyard in 2023

The Nashville Public Library features a variety of public programming. The library offers puppet shows in the Main Library as well as throughout the Nashville community.

The library offers digital collections, e-book and audiobook downloads, language learning services, and computer classes. There are a variety of book clubs hosted throughout the library system.

In 2010, the Nashville Public Library began partnering with Metropolitan Nashville Public Schools to offer students access to the public library materials. Called "Limitless Libraries," this program offers access to approximately 1.5 million information resources.

The Main Library's Special Collections Division contains several archival and oral history collections highlighting Nashville history. Among the highlights are the Civil Rights Room, documenting the Civil Rights Movement in Nashville, and an oral history collection documenting the 2010 Tennessee floods.

In 2017, NPL eliminated overdue fines in order to increase accessibility of book borrowing.

Be Well at NPL is a program that increases access to free wellness classes and resources to address health improvement priorities of Davidson County. NPL received a community engagement award through the National Institutes of Health, National Library of Medicine and NNLM-SEA to promote health literacy and equity across the city of Nashville. Since its inception, the program has grown tremendously and became successful, serving over 32,000 Nashvillians and library visitors with free programs that include mental health education, meditation, yoga, physical health, community gardening, family support classes, and more. Your Mind Matters, an initiative promoting mental health literacy, has received national recognition and is promoted by the American Library Association as the first of its kind.

== Friends of the Library and Library Foundation ==
Friends of the Nashville Public Library is a non-profit that offers memberships and supports the library through book sales. The Friends of the Nashville Public Library offer support for the summer reading program as well other programs and collection development.

The Nashville Public Library Foundation is a non-profit founded in 1997 to raise funds for the Nashville Public Library. Depending on private donors, the Nashville Public Library Foundation offers funds for various programs, services, and building improvements in the library system. These include funding of the Bringing Books to Life pre-school literacy program, the Special Collections' Civil Rights Room, and $5 million in collection development funds.

On December 2, 2015, The Nashville Public Library unveiled the new Kidman-Urban Puppet Stage in the children's section of the library, made possible by a donation from Nicole Kidman and Keith Urban, long time supporters of the library.
