= Chateau Theatre =

- Chateau Dodge Theatre
- U.S. National Register of Historic Places
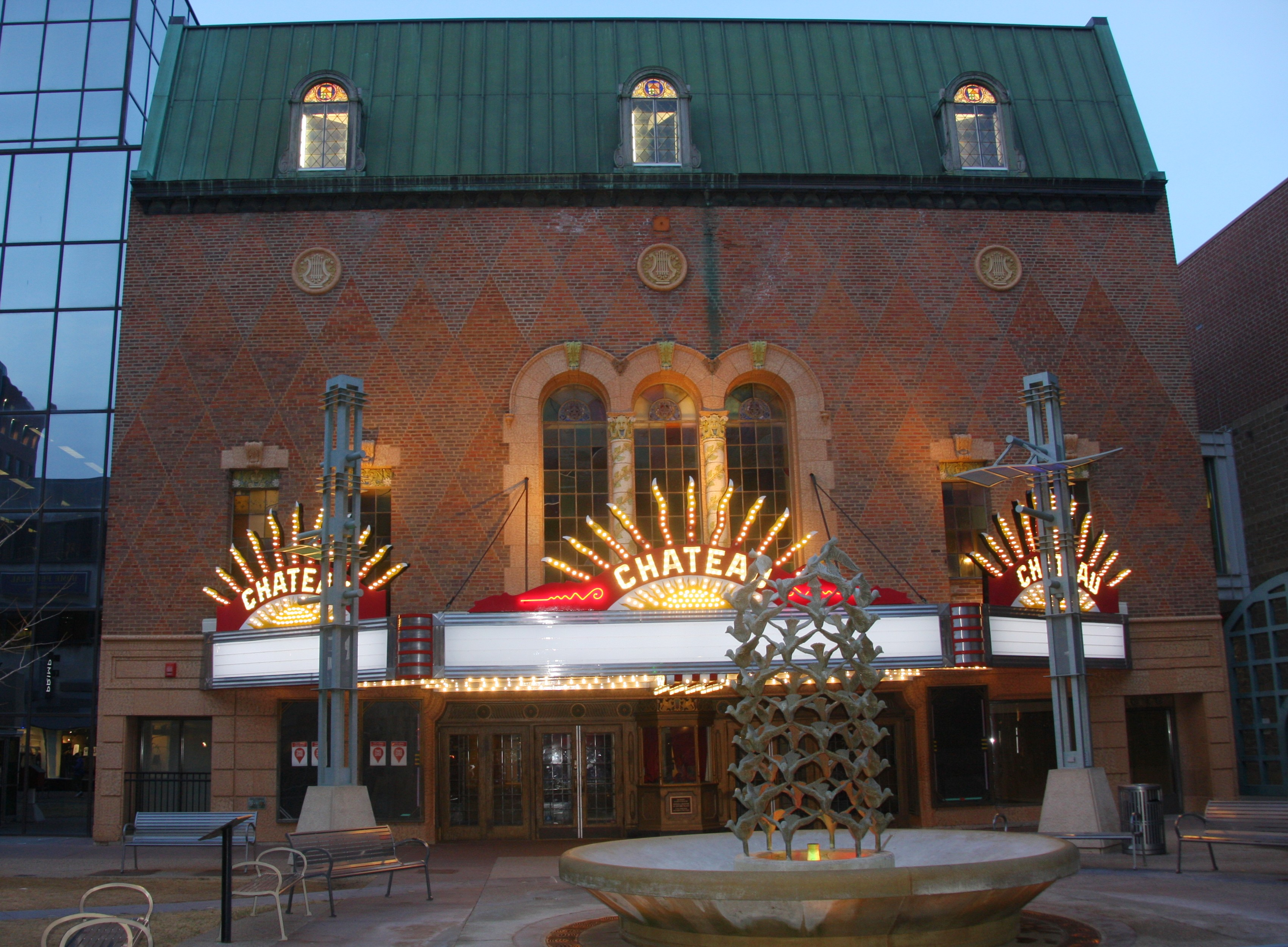
- Chateau Theatre in 2017

- Location within Minnesota Location within the United States
- Location: 15 1st Street SW, Rochester, Minnesota
- Coordinates: 44°1′22″N 92°27′50″W
- Built: 1927; 99 years ago
- Architect: Ellerbe Architects; Heffron & Fitzgerald, et al.
- Architectural style: French chateau
- NRHP reference No.: 80002098
- Added to NRHP: July 17, 1980

The Chateau Theatre originally opened as a vaudeville house in Rochester, Minnesota, in 1927 with an interior decorated as a medieval village. The theater was converted to a movie house eventually remodeled and reopened as a Barnes & Noble bookstore.

== History ==
In April 1927, Dr. Charles Mayo laid the building's cornerstone. The structure was originally called the Chateau Dodge Theatre because the Dodge Lumber Company had previously occupied this site. With construction costs of a then-unheard-of $400,000, the theatre opened on October 26, 1927, showing the movie Spring Fever.

The Chateau Theatre was one of Rochester's first air-conditioned buildings, presenting plays, concerts, operas, silent and later talking movies, and vaudeville. In 1940, 25 cents' admission provided audiences three acts of music/magic/juggling, newsreels, comedy, and a main show. Chateau headliners over the years included actresses Ethel Barrymore and Tallulah Bankhead, the husband-wife acting team of Lynn Fontanne and Alfred Lunt, cinema cowboy Tom Mix, Mary, the rhinoceros from Johnny Weissmuller's Tarzan, and bandleader Paul Whiteman ("The King of Jazz").

The Preservation Alliance of Minnesota calls the Chateau Theatre Minnesota's "last and best example of 'atmospheric theater". Its principal architecture is Art Deco, a design popularized first in Europe and later the U.S. (most famously in Hollywood and Miami) from the mid-1920s to the late 1930s.

== Modern appearance ==
The original theatre mezzanine and inner lobby are gone; all that remains are the railings and doorways to the restrooms and lounge areas. Originally, the main theatre floor had raked seating; that is, with the rows farther from the stage rising toward the rear. The theatre originally had 1,487 red velvet seats, compared to today's theaters which generally seat 200 at most.

The original film projection booth sits above the second floor balcony, hidden behind the giant Barnes & Noble mural. Because of the theatre's historic nature and a desire not to disturb its decorative side walls — which replicate an early French (Normandy) village — the floor is attached only at the building's front and back walls while also supported by main floor pillars. The castle, with 40 balconies and 20-foot-high (6.1 m) turrets, resembles a 10th-century French castle (chateau). Originally passageways extended for actors to appear at the numerous windows and balconies.

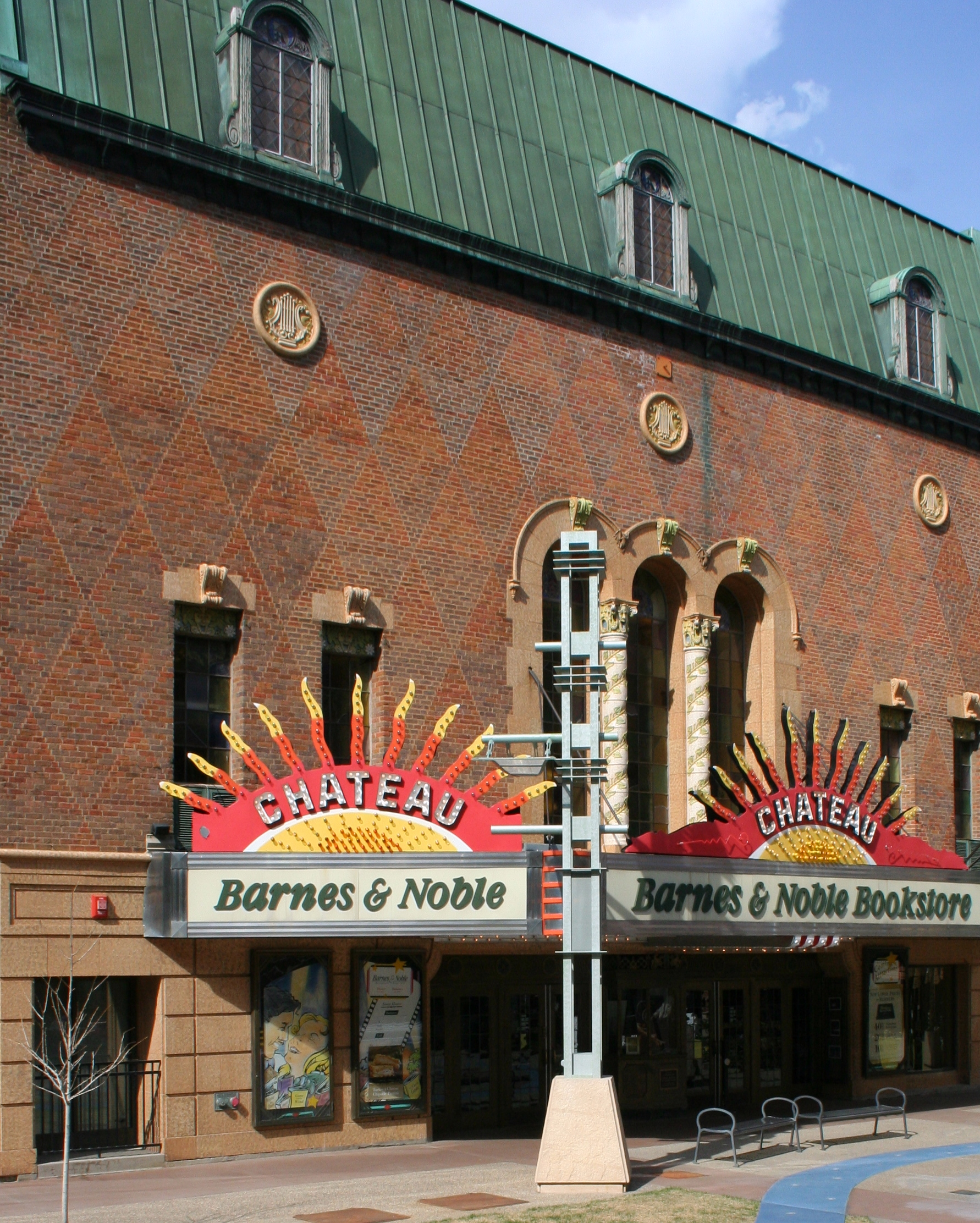
The theatre when it was a Barnes & Noble bookstore

The theatre ceiling is still the same dark blue as the original. The constellations, which once twinkled as dramatic scenes gradually changed from day to night, are still visible although difficult to see because of the larger spotlights later installed by Barnes & Noble. In addition to a "moon machine," also still present but no longer functioning is a cloud machine, once used to project shadows of clouds across the ceiling. The pipe organ playing for melodrama and silent movies was located on the west side of the current children's book section; organ pipes were housed in the castle gate. The proscenium arch at the top of the escalator rises above the Chateau Theatre's former stage, which measured 33 feet (10 m) across and along with the organ rose to audience eye level at the start of each performance. Along with multiple dressing rooms, backstage included metal stairs climbing five flights, with showers and toilets at every other level.

In 1979 the "World Wide Friends of the Chateau" was formed and was instrumental in preserving the theatre from demolition. Although the theatre was added to the National Register of Historic Places in 1980, it closed on October 2, 1983, with the 1934 movie classic It Happened One Night, starring Clark Gable and Claudette Colbert. Following nearly eleven years of debate. negotiation, and ultimately $4 million of renovation, Barnes & Noble reopened the doors of the Chateau Theatre on July 1, 1994.

The building was added to the National Register of Historic Places in 1980.

On January 2, 2015, the Barnes & Noble inside the Chateau Theatre closed.
