= National Medal for Museum and Library Service =

Award given to American libraries and museums

The National Medal for Museum and Library Service is an award given annually by the Institute of Museum and Library Services (IMLS) to American libraries and museums with outstanding service to their communities. The IMLS refers to the medal as "the nation’s highest honor conferred on museums and libraries for service to the community." The award is typically presented by the first lady of the United States.

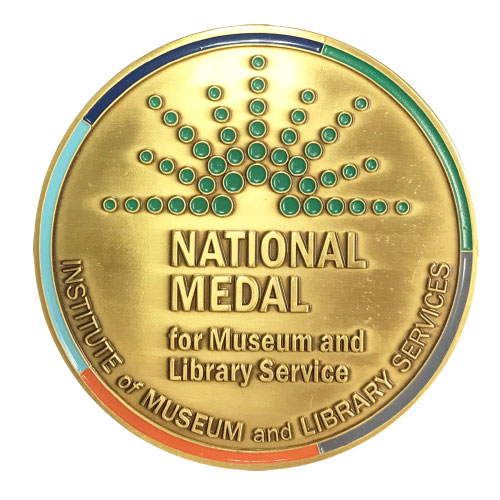
U.S. highest honor for institutions that make significant and exceptional contributions to their communities.

From 1994 to 1999, the award was known as the National Award for Museum Service and given to museums only. From 2000 to 2006, it was awarded to three museums and three libraries annually, and was known as the "National Award for Museum and Library Service". From 2007 to the present, it has borne its present name, and been awarded to up to five museums and five libraries.

The lists of awardees for 1994–2009 are drawn from the 2009 medals booklet, published by the IMLS.

== 1994 ==
- Brukner Nature Center, Troy, Ohio
- The Cummer Museum of Art and Gardens, Jacksonville, Florida
- Missouri Historical Society, St. Louis, Missouri

== 1995 ==
- Brooklyn Children's Museum, Brooklyn, New York
- The Mexican Fine Arts Center Museum, Chicago, Illinois
- Montshire Museum of Science, Norwich, Vermont
- The Wing Luke Asian Museum, Seattle, Washington

== 1996 ==
- The Corcoran Gallery of Art, Washington, DC
- The Field Museum, Chicago, Illinois
- The Natural Science Center of Greensboro, Greensboro, North Carolina

== 1997 ==
- The Children's Museum of Indianapolis, Indianapolis, Indiana
- The Museum of Fine Arts, Houston, Texas
- National Aquarium in Baltimore, Baltimore, Maryland

== 1998 ==
- Belknap Mill Society, Laconia, New Hampshire
- Henry Ford Museum & Greenfield Village, Dearborn, Michigan
- New Jersey Historical Society, Newark, New Jersey

== 1999 ==
- Lincoln Park Zoo, Chicago, Illinois
- Nevada Museum of Art, Reno, Nevada
- St. Simons Island Lighthouse Museum, St. Simons Island, Georgia

== 2000 ==
In 2000, the first year that the award was given to libraries, the following seven institutions received it:

- Albright-Knox Art Gallery, Buffalo, New York
- Alutiiq Museum & Archaeological Repository, Kodiak, Alaska
- B.B. Comer Memorial Library, Sylacauga, Alabama
- Queens Borough Public Library, Jamaica, New York
- Simon Wiesenthal Center Library and Archives, Los Angeles, California
- Urie Elementary School Library, Lyman, Wyoming
- Youth Museum of Southern West Virginia, Beckley, West Virginia

== 2001 ==
- Alaska Resources Library and Information Services, Anchorage, Alaska
- Children's Discovery Museum of San Jose, San Jose, California
- Hancock County Library System, Bay St. Louis, Mississippi
- Miami Museum of Science, Miami, Florida
- New England Aquarium, Boston, Massachusetts
- Providence Public Library, Providence, Rhode Island

== 2002 ==
- Boundary County District Library, Bonners Ferry, Idaho
- Hartford Public Library, Hartford, Connecticut
- Please Touch Museum, Philadelphia, Pennsylvania
- Southern Alleghenies Museum of Art, Loretto, Pennsylvania
- Southwest Georgia Regional Public Library System, Bainbridge, Georgia
- Wildlife Conservation Society/Bronx Zoo, Bronx, New York

== 2003 ==
- Bozeman Public Library, Bozeman, Montana
- Carnegie Science Center, Pittsburgh, Pennsylvania
- Free Library of Philadelphia, Philadelphia, Pennsylvania
- Pocahontas County Free Libraries, Marlinton, West Virginia
- San Angelo Museum of Fine Arts, San Angelo, Texas
- USS Constitution Museum, Boston, Massachusetts

== 2004 ==
- Chicago Botanic Garden, Chicago, Illinois
- Flint Public Library, Flint, Michigan
- Mayagüez Children's Library, Mayagüez, Puerto Rico
- The Regional Academic Health Center Medical Library of the University of Texas Health Science Center, San Antonio, Texas
- Western Folklife Center, Elko, Nevada
- Zoological Society of San Diego, San Diego, California

== 2005 ==
- COSI Toledo, Toledo, Ohio
- Johnson County Library, Overland Park, Kansas
- Levine Museum of the New South, Charlotte, North Carolina
- Mathews Memorial Library, Mathews, Virginia
- Pratt Museum, Homer, Alaska
- Saint Paul Public Library, Saint Paul, MN

== 2006 ==
- Artrain USA, Ann Arbor, Michigan
- Frankfort Community Public Library, Frankfort, Indiana
- John G. Shedd Aquarium, Chicago, Illinois
- Lincoln Children's Zoo, Lincoln, NE
- Public Library of Charlotte and Mecklenburg County, Charlotte, North Carolina
- San Antonio Public Library, San Antonio, Texas

== 2007 ==
- Birmingham Civil Rights Institute, Birmingham, Alabama
- Brookfield Zoo of the Chicago Zoological Society, Brookfield, Illinois
- Georgetown County Library, Georgetown, South Carolina
- Kim Yerton Branch of the Humboldt County Library, Hoopa, California
- Memphis Public Library & Information Center, Memphis, Tennessee
- National Museum of Women in the Arts, Washington, DC
- The Newberry Library, Chicago, Illinois
- Ocean County Library, Toms River, New Jersey
- Oregon Museum of Science and Industry, Portland, Oregon
- Vermont Historical Society, Barre, Vermont

== 2008 ==
- Buffalo Bill Historical Center, Cody, Wyoming
- The Franklin Institute, Philadelphia, Pennsylvania
- General Lew Wallace Study and Museum, Crawfordsville, Indiana
- Jane Stern Dorado Community Library, Dorado, Puerto Rico
- Kansas City Public Library, Kansas City, Missouri
- Lower East Side Tenement Museum, New York, New York
- Miami-Dade Public Library System, Miami, Florida
- Norton Museum of Art, West Palm Beach, Florida
- Skidompha Public Library, Damariscotta, Maine
- Skokie Public Library, Skokie, Illinois

== 2009 ==
- Braille Institute Library Services, Los Angeles, California
- Children's Museum of Pittsburgh, Pittsburgh, Pennsylvania
- Cincinnati Museum Center at Union Terminal, Cincinnati, Ohio
- Gail Borden Public Library, Elgin, Illinois
- Indianapolis Museum of Art, Indianapolis, Indiana
- Multnomah County Library, Portland, Oregon
- Museum of Science & Industry, Tampa, Florida
- Pritzker Military Museum & Library, Chicago, Illinois
- Stark County District Library, Canton, Ohio
- Tennessee Aquarium, Chattanooga, Tennessee

== 2010 ==
In 2010, the award was given to the following ten libraries and museums:

- Conner Prairie Interactive History Park, Fishers, Indiana
- Explora, Albuquerque, New Mexico
- Japanese American National Museum, Los Angeles, California
- Mississippi Museum of Art, Jackson, MS
- Nashville Public Library, Nashville, Tennessee
- The New York Botanical Garden, Bronx, New York
- Patchogue-Medford Library, Patchogue, New York
- Peter White Public Library, Marquette, Michigan
- Rangeview Library District and Anythink Libraries, Adams County, Colorado
- West Bloomfield Township Public Library, West Bloomfield Township, Michigan

== 2011 ==
In 2011, the award was given to the following ten libraries and museums:

- Alachua County Library District, Gainesville, Florida
- Brooklyn Museum, Brooklyn, New York
- Columbus Metropolitan Library, Columbus, Ohio
- EdVenture Children's Museum, Columbia, South Carolina
- Erie Art Museum, Erie, Pennsylvania
- Hill Museum & Manuscript Library, Collegeville, Minnesota
- Lewis Ginter Botanical Garden, Richmond, Virginia
- Madison Children's Museum, Madison, Wisconsin
- San Jose Public Library, San Jose, California
- Weippe Public Library & Discovery Center, Weippe, Idaho

== 2012 ==
In 2012, the award was given to the following ten libraries and museums:

- Bootheel Youth Museum, Malden, Missouri
- Contra Costa County Library, Pleasant Hill, California
- Cumberland County Public Library, Fayetteville, North Carolina
- Garfield Park Conservatory, Chicago, Illinois
- Long Island Children's Museum, Garden City, New York
- Museum of Contemporary Art, North Miami, Florida
- Naturita Community Library, Naturita, Colorado
- Pacific Science Center, Seattle, Washington
- Park View High School Library Media Center, Sterling, Virginia
- Shaler North Hills Library, Glenshaw, Pennsylvania

== 2013 ==
In 2013, the award was given to the following ten libraries and museums, and presented by First Lady Michelle Obama:

- Boston Children's Museum, Boston, Massachusetts
- Columbus Museum of Art, Columbus, Ohio
- Delta Blues Museum, Clarksdale, Mississippi
- Discovery Science Center, Santa Ana, California
- Marshalltown Public Library, Marshalltown, Iowa
- National Czech & Slovak Museum & Library, Cedar Rapids, Iowa
- Pierce County Library System, Tacoma, Washington
- Public Library of Cincinnati and Hamilton County, Cincinnati, Ohio
- Rancho Cucamonga Public Library, Rancho Cucamonga, California
- Waukegan Public Library, Waukegan, Illinois

== 2014 ==
In 2014, the award was given to the following ten libraries and museums:

- Chicago Public Library, Chicago, Illinois
- Brooklyn Botanic Garden, Brooklyn, New York
- Las Vegas-Clark County Library District, Las Vegas, Nevada
- Mid-Continent Public Library, Independence, Missouri
- Mystic Aquarium, Mystic, Connecticut
- North Carolina Museum of Natural Sciences, Raleigh, North Carolina
- Octavia Fellin Public Library, Gallup, New Mexico
- Sam Noble Oklahoma Museum of Natural History, Norman, Oklahoma
- The Children's Museum of Indianapolis, Indianapolis, Indiana
- Yiddish Book Center, Amherst, Massachusetts

== 2015 ==
In 2015, the award was given to the following ten libraries and museums:

- Amazement Square, Lynchburg, Virginia
- Cecil County Public Library, Elkton, Maryland
- Craig Public Library, Craig, Alaska
- Embudo Valley Library and Community Center, Dixon, New Mexico
- Los Angeles Public Library, Los Angeles, California
- Louisiana Children’s Museum, New Orleans, Louisiana
- Museum of Northern Arizona, Flagstaff, Arizona
- New York Hall of Science, Queens, New York
- The Schomburg Center for Research in Black Culture, New York, New York
- The Tech Museum of Innovation, San Jose, California

== 2016 ==
In 2016, the award was given to the following ten libraries and museums:

- Brooklyn Public Library, Brooklyn, New York
- The Chicago History Museum, Chicago, Illinois
- Columbia Museum of Art, Columbia, South Carolina
- Lynn Meadows Discovery Center for Children, Gulfport, Mississippi
- Madison Public Library, Madison, Wisconsin
- Mid-America Science Museum, Hot Springs, Arkansas
- North Carolina State University Libraries, Raleigh, North Carolina
- Otis Library, Norwich, Connecticut
- Santa Ana Public Library, Santa Ana, California
- Tomaquag Museum, Exeter, Rhode Island

== 2017 ==
In 2017, the award was given to the following ten libraries and museums:

- Alaska State Museums, Juneau, Alaska
- Aspen Art Museum, Aspen, Colorado
- Cedar Rapids Public Library, Cedar Rapids, Iowa
- Illinois Holocaust Museum & Education Center, Skokie, Illinois
- Leigh Yawkey Woodson Art Museum, Wausau, Wisconsin
- Long Beach Public Library, Long Beach, California
- Peralta Hacienda Historical Park, Oakland, California
- Richland Library, Columbia, South Carolina
- University of Minnesota Libraries, Minneapolis, Minnesota
- Waterville Public Library, Waterville, Maine

== 2018 ==
In 2018, the award was given to the following ten libraries and museums:

- Children's Museum of Denver at Marsico Campus, Denver, Colorado
- Detroit Historical Museum, Detroit, Michigan
- El Paso Museum of Art, El Paso, Texas
- Georgetown Public Library, Georgetown, Texas
- History Museum at the Castle, Appleton, Wisconsin
- Orange County Library System, Orlando, Florida
- Pueblo City–County Library District, Pueblo, Colorado
- Reading Public Library, Reading, Pennsylvania
- Rochester Public Library, Rochester, Minnesota
- University of Oregon Museum of Natural and Cultural History, Eugene, Oregon

== 2019 ==
In 2019, the award was given to the following ten libraries and museums:

- Jamestown S'Klallam Tribal Library, Sequim, Washington
- Inter-university Consortium for Political and Social Research at University of Michigan, Ann Arbor, Michigan
- New Haven Free Public Library, New Haven, Connecticut
- Gulfport Public Library, Gulfport, Florida
- Meridian Library District, Meridian, Idaho
- Barona Cultural Center and Museum, Lakeside, California
- Children's Museum, San Diego, California
- Historical Society of Central Florida, Orlando, Florida
- Lorraine Civil Rights Museum, Memphis, Tennessee
- South Carolina Aquarium, Charleston, South Carolina

== 2020 ==
No awards were made in 2020.

== 2021 ==
In 2021, the award was given to the following six libraries and museums:

- Cabell County Public Library, Huntington, West Virginia
- Highwood Public Library, Highwood, Illinois
- Memphis Public Libraries, Memphis, Tennessee
- High Desert Museum, Bend, Oregon
- Mississippi Children's Museum, Jackson, Mississippi
- Museo de Arte de Ponce, Ponce, Puerto Rico

== 2022 ==
In 2022, the award was given to the following six libraries and museums:

- Amistad Research Center, New Orleans, Louisiana
- St. Louis County Library, St. Louis, Missouri
- Wilmington Institute Free Library, Wilmington, Delaware
- Asheville Art Museum, Asheville, North Carolina
- Burke Museum of Natural History and Culture, Seattle, Washington
- Oakland Museum of California, Oakland, California

== 2023 ==
In 2023, the award was given to the following eight libraries and museums:

- Kuskokwim Consortium Library, Bethel, Alaska
- LA County Library, Los Angeles, California
- Long Branch Free Public Library, Long Branch, New Jersey
- Toledo-Lucas County Public Library, Toledo, Ohio
- Center of Science and Industry (COSI), Columbus, Ohio
- Jim Gatchell Memorial Museum, Buffalo, Wyoming
- Museum of Discovery and Science, Fort Lauderdale, Florida
- Riverside Art Museum, Riverside, California

== 2024 ==
In 2024, the award was given to the following ten libraries and museums:

Libraries:

- The Copper Queen Library (Bisbee, AZ)
- DC Public Library (Washington, DC)
- Griswold Memorial Library (Colrain, MA)
- Harris County Public Library (Houston, TX)
- Kent District Library (Comstock Park, MI)

Museums:

- Arizona-Sonora Desert Museum (Tucson, AZ)
- Children’s Museum Houston (Houston, TX)
- Discovery Museum (Acton, MA)
- The Louis Armstrong House Museum (Queens, NY)
- Phipps Conservatory and Botanical Gardens (Pittsburgh, PA)
