= Rochester, Minnesota =

- City
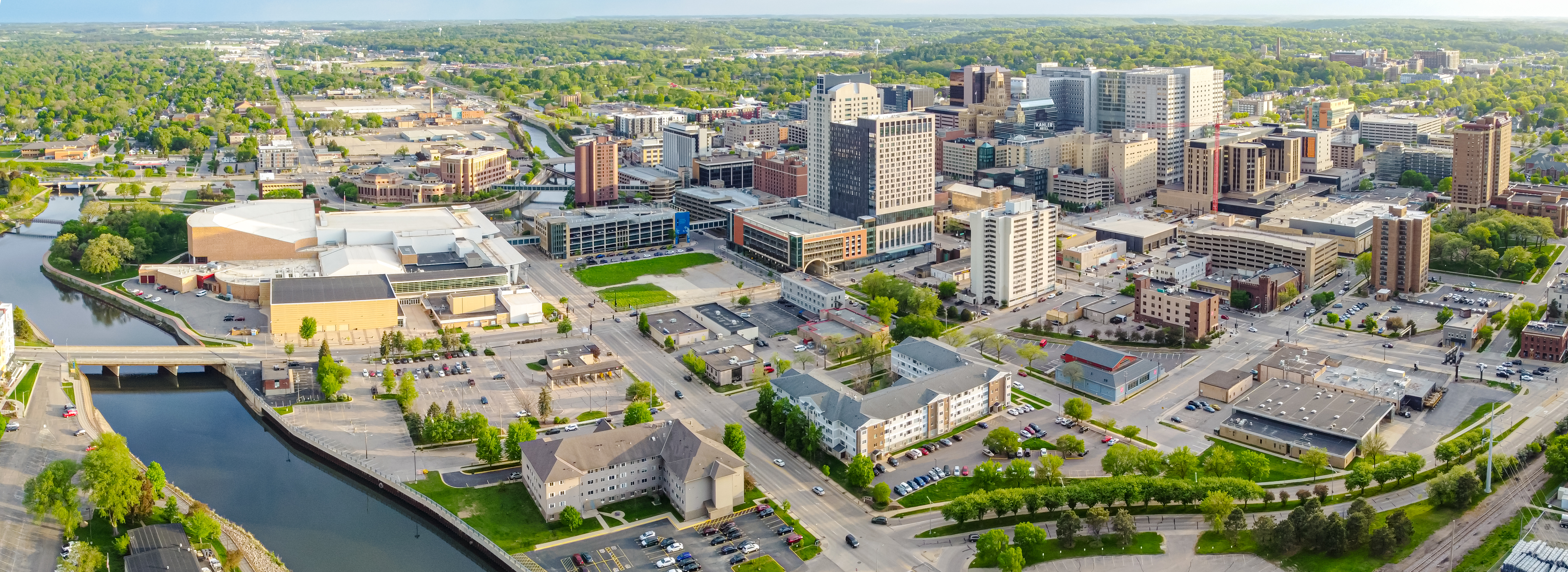
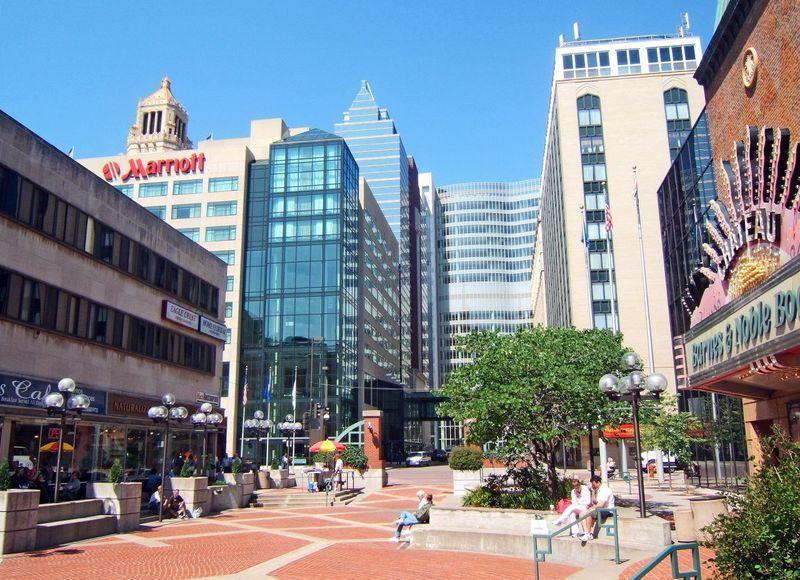
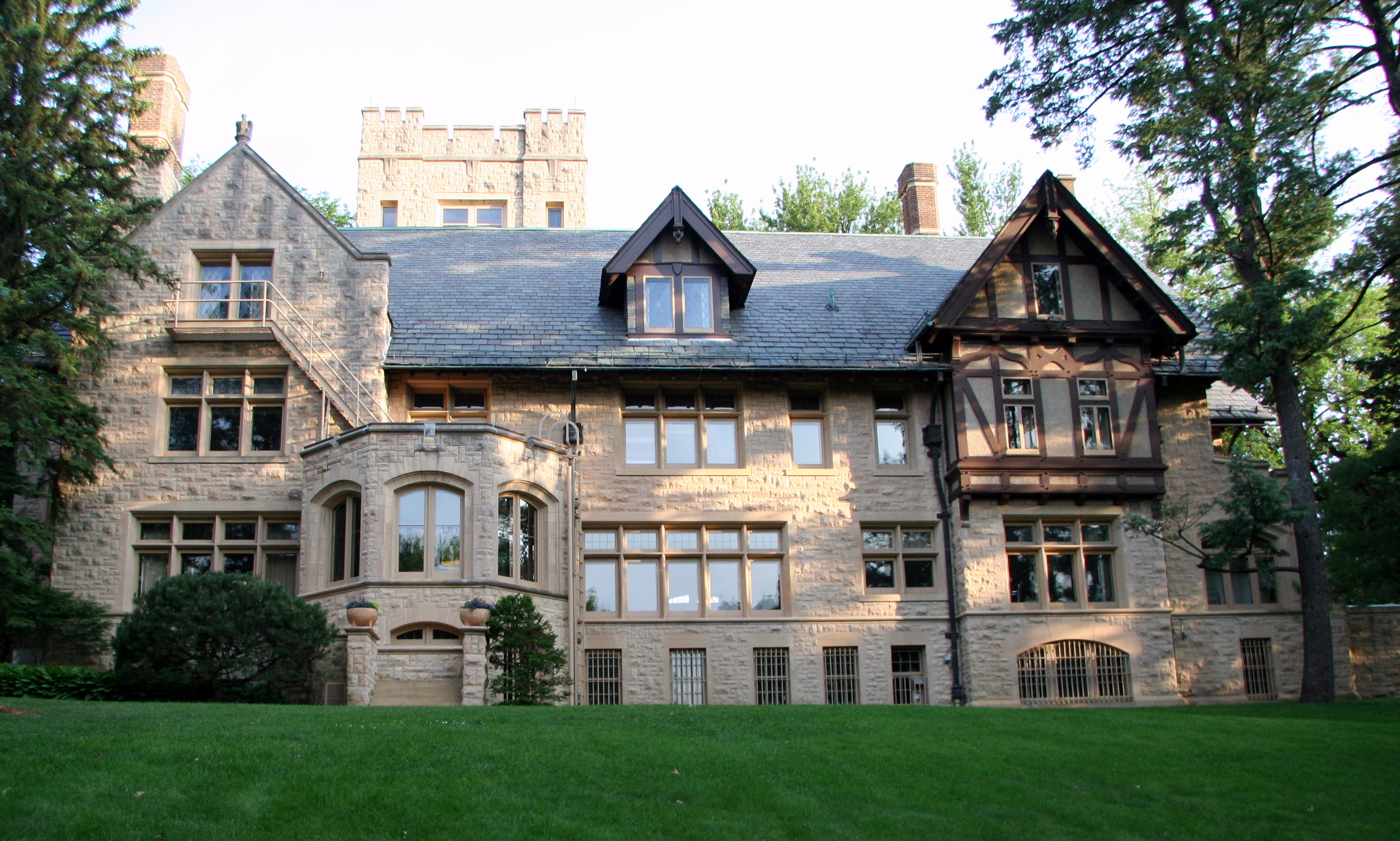
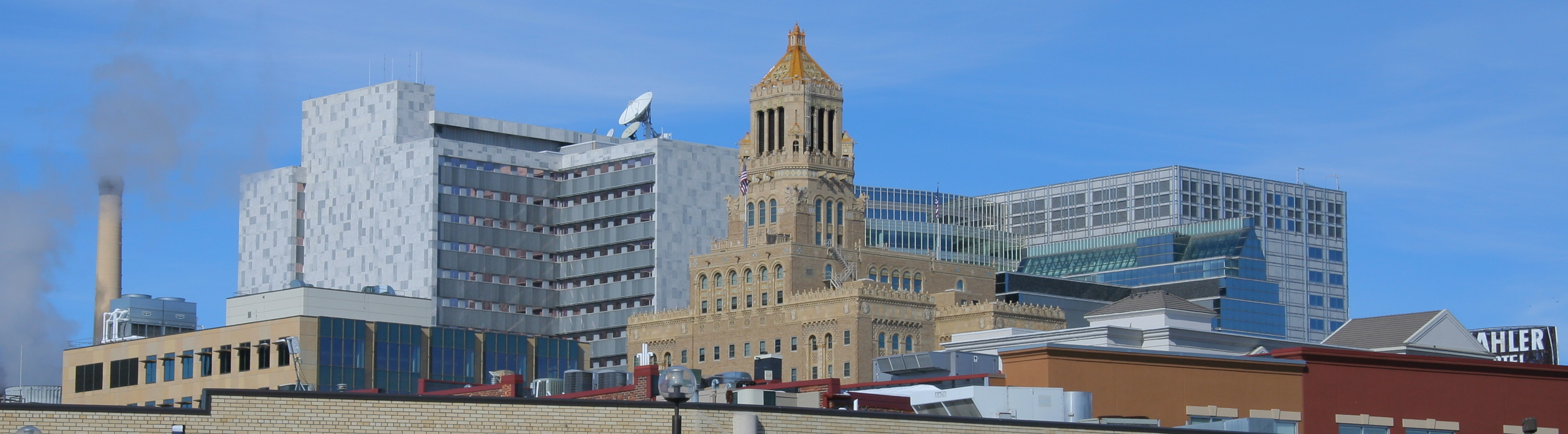
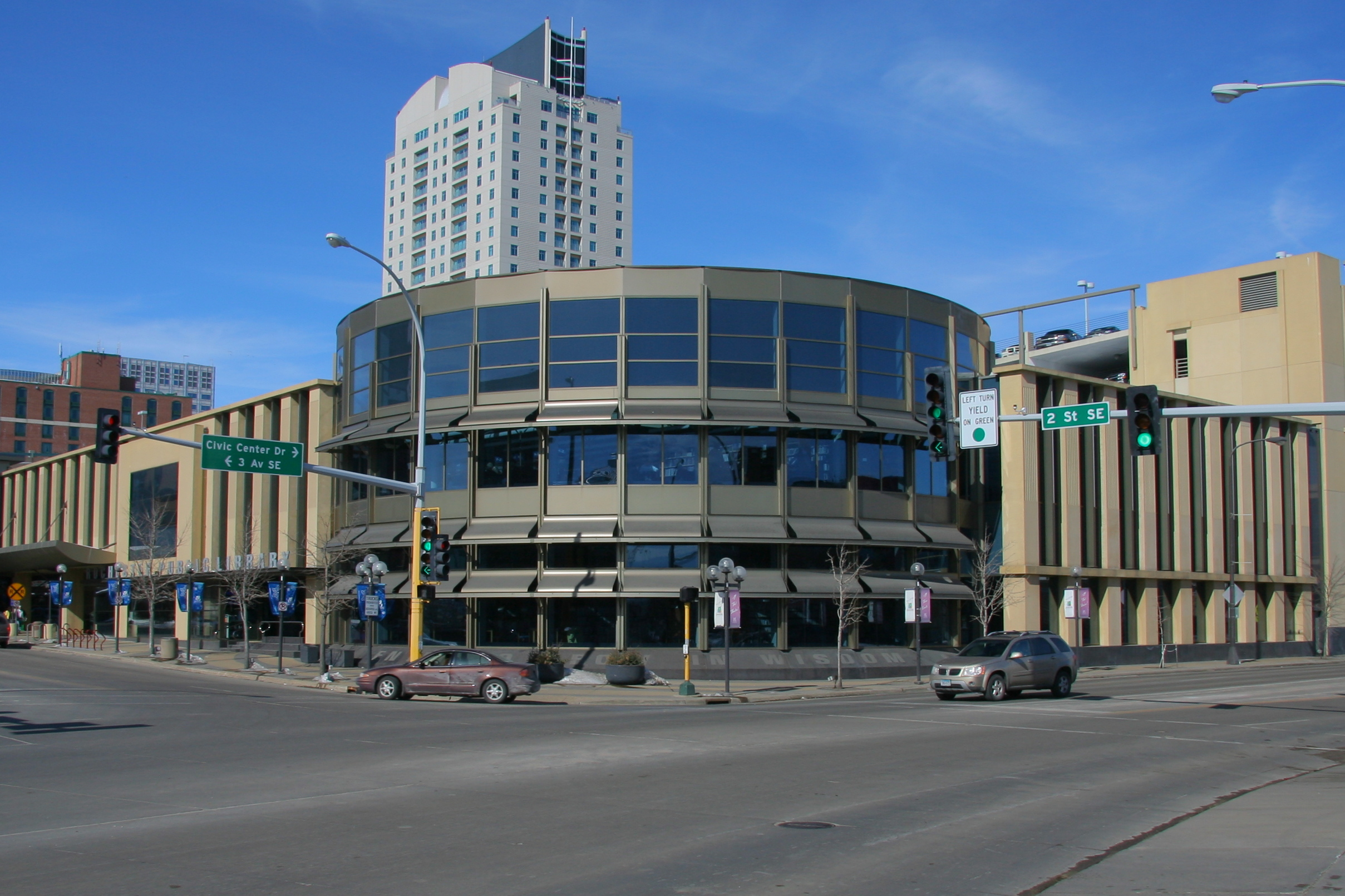
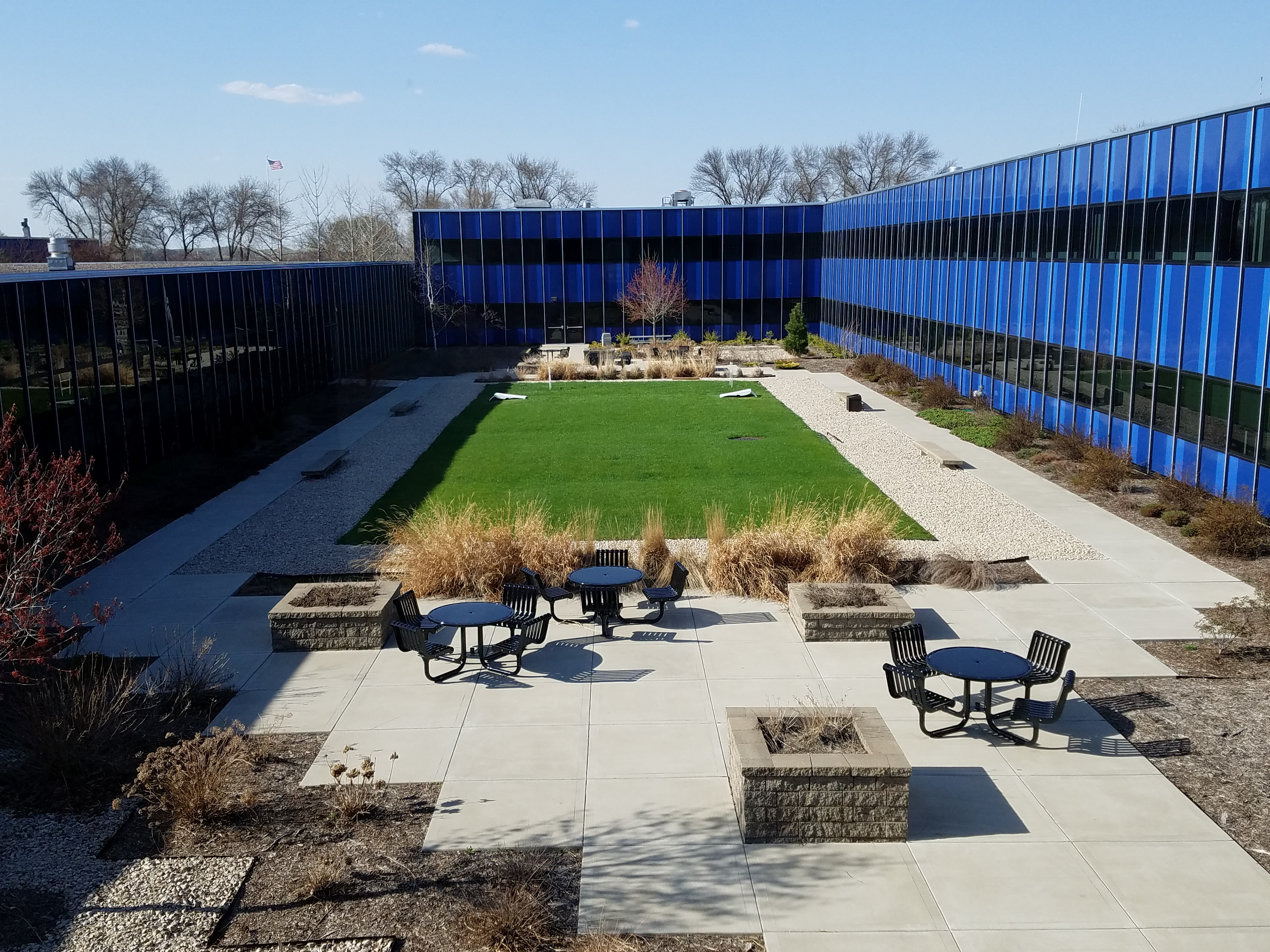
- Rochester Skyline and Zumbro River Downtown Rochester Dr. William J. Mayo House Mayo Clinic: Mayo, Gonda, and Plummer Buildings Rochester Public Library Rochester Technology Campus

- Flag Seal
- Nickname(s): Med City, Roch
- Motto: America's City of Care and Innovation
- Interactive map of Rochester, Minnesota
- Location within Minnesota Location within the United States
- Coordinates: 44.014299°N 92.478592°W
- Country: United States
- State: Minnesota
- County: Olmsted
- Founded: July 12, 1854
- Incorporated: August 5, 1858
- Founder: George Head

Government
  - Type: Mayor–Council
  - Mayor: Kim Norton (DFL)
  - City manager: Alison Zelms

Area
  - City: 57.151 sq mi (148.020 km^{2})
  - Land: 56.806 sq mi (147.128 km^{2})
  - Water: 0.344 sq mi (0.890 km^{2}) 0.6%
- Elevation: 1,129 ft (344 m)

Population (2020)
  - City: 121,395
  - Estimate (2025): 124,292
  - Rank: US: 238th MN: 3rd
  - Density: 2,136.99/sq mi (825.098/km^{2})
  - Urban: 121,587 (US: 273rd)
  - Metro: 230,742 (US: 207th)
- Time zone: UTC–6 (Central (CST))
  - Summer (DST): UTC–5 (CDT)
- ZIP Codes: 55901, 55902, 55903, 55904, 55905, 55906
- Area codes: 507 and 924
- FIPS code: 27-54880
- GNIS feature ID: 2396395
- Website: rochestermn.gov

Rochester is a city in and the county seat of Olmsted County, Minnesota, United States. It is located along rolling bluffs on the Zumbro River's south fork in Southeast Minnesota. The population was 121,395 at the 2020 census, and was estimated at 124,292 in 2025, making it the third-most populous city in Minnesota. The Rochester metropolitan area has an estimated 230,000 residents. The city is the home and birthplace of Mayo Clinic.

Rochester first developed as a stagecoach stop between Dubuque, Iowa, and Saint Paul, Minnesota. With the creation of the Mayo Clinic in 1864, Rochester became a national center for healthcare, as well as a hub for regional agriculture. For higher education needs the University of Minnesota Rochester, Rochester Community and Technical College, and Mayo Clinic Alix School of Medicine are located in the city.

== History ==
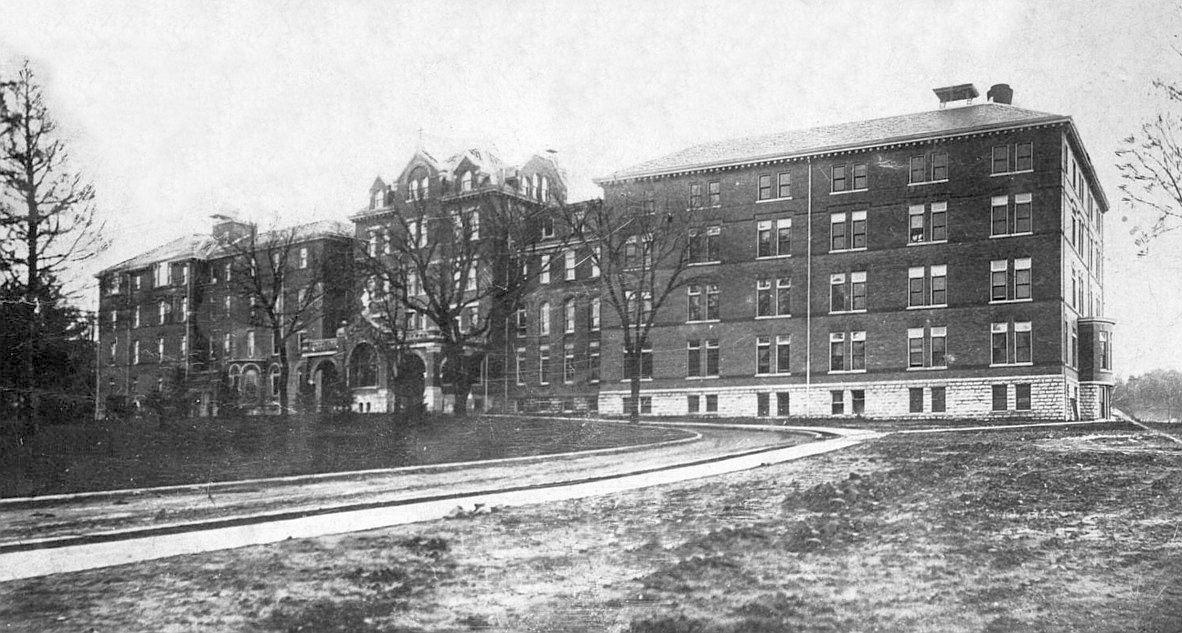
St. Marys Hospital (1910)

Several indigenous peoples such as Dakota, Ojibway, and Ho-Chunk inhabited the Rochester area. The community was founded by George Head and his wife Henrietta, who built a log cabin named Head's Tavern in 1854. It was named for Head's hometown of Rochester, New York. The city developed as a stagecoach stop along the Zumbro River on a route between Dubuque, Iowa, and Saint Paul, Minnesota. When the Winona and St. Peter Railroad initiated service in October 1864, it brought new residents and business opportunities and spurred growth.

In 1863, William W. Mayo arrived as the examining surgeon for Union draftees in the Civil War. The 1883 Rochester Tornado demolished much of Rochester, leaving 37 dead and approximately 200 injured. As there was no medical facility in the immediate area at the time, Mayo and his two sons worked together to care for the wounded. Donations of US$60,000 (US$1,932,562 in 2022) were collected and the Sisters of St. Francis, assisted by Mayo, opened a new facility named St. Marys Hospital in 1889.

== Geography ==
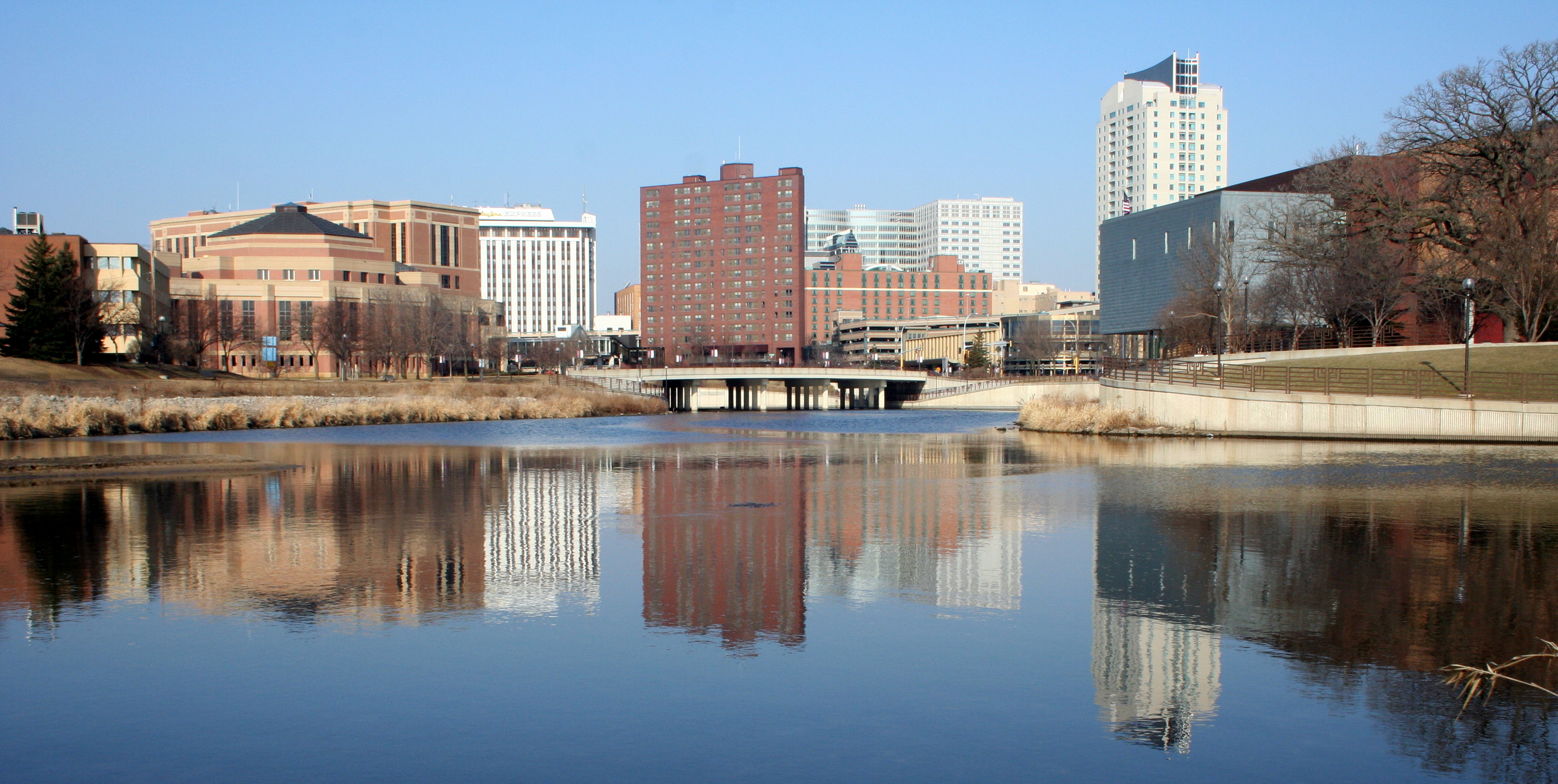
Zumbro River in downtown Rochester

Rochester lies alongside the South Fork of the Zumbro River which is 57.6 miles (92.7 km) long and is ringed by gentle hills and largely surrounded by farmland within a deciduous forest biome. The Zumbro Watershed flows through 1,422 square miles (3,680 km^{2}) of agricultural and urban lands. Located in southeast Minnesota, the City of Rochester lies at the western edge of the Driftless Area, a region that was never glaciated and contains deeply-carved river valleys. The rugged terrain is due both to the lack of glacial deposits, or drift, and to the incision of the upper Mississippi River and its tributaries into bedrock. According to the United States Census Bureau, the city has a total area of 57.151 square miles (148.02 km^{2}), of which 56.807 square miles (147.13 km^{2}) is land and 0.344 square miles (0.89 km^{2}) (0.6%) is water. The city is located 85 miles (137 km) southeast of Minneapolis–Saint Paul.

Rochester is in Olmsted County, one of only four counties in Minnesota without a natural lake. Artificial lakes exist in the area, including Silver Lake, a dammed portion of the South Fork Zumbro River just below the convergence with Silver Creek near the city center. Silver Lake was once used as a cooling pond when the coal-burning power plant was operated by Rochester Public Utilities at the lake. When operational, the RPU coal plant's heated water output prevented the lake from generally freezing over during the winter months, attracting large numbers of migrating giant Canada geese. Large murders of crows are known to flock to Rochester during winter, including the Rochester cemetery downtown.

Rochester has an extensive parks system, the largest of which are Silver Lake and Soldiers Field in the central part of the city. A major flood in 1978 led the city to embark on an expensive and successful flood-control project that involved altering many nearby rivers and streams. The Zumbro River flowing through the center of the city is presently being readdressed for increased development and use as part of city planning in conjunction with funding from the Destination Medical Center project.

=== Climate ===
With a slightly higher altitude and without the same Urban heat island effect as the Twin Cities, the climate is warm-summer humid continental climate (Köppen: Dfb), which is cooler than the Twin Cities, despite being further south, with warm summers and cold winters. The city features four distinct seasons. Rochester sees on average 33.02 inches (839 mm) of rainfall and 51.9 inches (132 cm) of snowfall per year. Significant snow accumulation is common during the winter months. Spring and fall are transitional seasons, with a general warming trend during the spring and a general cooling trend during the fall. However, it is not uncommon to see some snowfall during the early month of spring and the later month of fall. Rochester is the second windiest city in the United States, with wind speeds averaging 12.6 mph (20.3 km/h). January to April are the windiest months on average, according to The Weather Channel. Rochester has been hit by two F4 tornadoes since 1950 (the first on May 10, 1953, and the other on September 16, 1962). The city has also been hit by two tornadoes in the past decade. On June 17, 2010, a tornado hit the city's northwest side, damaging or destroying several homes and businesses around the Lincolnshire neighborhood. Another tornado struck the city on June 4, 2019, causing damage to parts of Southwest Rochester.

Climate data for Rochester International Airport, Minnesota (1991–2020 normals, (Note: Mean monthly maxima and minima (i.e. the expected highest and lowest temperature readings at any point during the year or given month) calculated based on data at said location from 1991 to 2020.) extremes 1886–present)
Month	Jan	Feb	Mar	Apr	May	Jun	Jul	Aug	Sep	Oct	Nov	Dec	Year
Record high °F (°C)	58 (14)	69 (21)	82 (28)	92 (33)	106 (41)	105 (41)	108 (42)	100 (38)	100 (38)	93 (34)	77 (25)	64 (18)	108 (42)
Mean maximum °F (°C)	40.9 (4.9)	44.1 (6.7)	62.3 (16.8)	79.0 (26.1)	87.3 (30.7)	90.7 (32.6)	89.7 (32.1)	87.5 (30.8)	86.1 (30.1)	79.9 (26.6)	62.8 (17.1)	45.3 (7.4)	93.0 (33.9)
Mean daily maximum °F (°C)	22.5 (−5.3)	26.7 (−2.9)	39.9 (4.4)	55.3 (12.9)	68.0 (20.0)	77.6 (25.3)	80.3 (26.8)	78.0 (25.6)	71.8 (22.1)	57.9 (14.4)	41.7 (5.4)	28.0 (−2.2)	54.0 (12.2)
Daily mean °F (°C)	14.7 (−9.6)	18.7 (−7.4)	31.7 (−0.2)	45.2 (7.3)	57.6 (14.2)	67.5 (19.7)	70.5 (21.4)	68.2 (20.1)	61.1 (16.2)	47.9 (8.8)	33.6 (0.9)	20.8 (−6.2)	44.8 (7.1)
Mean daily minimum °F (°C)	7.0 (−13.9)	10.7 (−11.8)	23.4 (−4.8)	35.1 (1.7)	47.1 (8.4)	57.5 (14.2)	60.8 (16.0)	58.3 (14.6)	50.4 (10.2)	38.0 (3.3)	25.6 (−3.6)	13.6 (−10.2)	35.6 (2.0)
Mean minimum °F (°C)	−16.6 (−27.0)	−11.1 (−23.9)	−0.7 (−18.2)	20.0 (−6.7)	33.3 (0.7)	45.2 (7.3)	50.5 (10.3)	48.4 (9.1)	35.4 (1.9)	22.0 (−5.6)	7.0 (−13.9)	−9.8 (−23.2)	−19.6 (−28.7)
Record low °F (°C)	−42 (−41)	−35 (−37)	−31 (−35)	5 (−15)	21 (−6)	31 (−1)	40 (4)	32 (0)	22 (−6)	−6 (−21)	−24 (−31)	−33 (−36)	−42 (−41)
Average precipitation inches (mm)	0.99 (25)	1.02 (26)	2.02 (51)	3.52 (89)	4.35 (110)	5.35 (136)	4.19 (106)	4.12 (105)	3.60 (91)	2.43 (62)	1.80 (46)	1.28 (33)	34.67 (881)
Average snowfall inches (cm)	12.2 (31)	10.7 (27)	8.6 (22)	3.3 (8.4)	0.5 (1.3)	0.0 (0.0)	0.0 (0.0)	0.0 (0.0)	0.0 (0.0)	0.9 (2.3)	4.5 (11)	12.4 (31)	53.1 (135)
Average precipitation days (≥ 0.01 in)	9.4	8.0	10.2	12.2	13.3	12.5	10.5	10.0	9.3	9.5	9.2	9.6	123.7
Average snowy days (≥ 0.1 in)	8.8	7.3	5.6	2.6	0.1	0.0	0.0	0.0	0.0	0.8	4.5	8.7	38.4
Average relative humidity (%)	76.6	76.1	74.8	68.3	66.8	68.9	72.2	74.6	75.2	71.5	77.4	80.0	73.5
Average dew point °F (°C)	5.9 (−14.5)	10.9 (−11.7)	22.5 (−5.3)	33.4 (0.8)	44.6 (7.0)	54.9 (12.7)	60.4 (15.8)	58.5 (14.7)	50.2 (10.1)	37.9 (3.3)	25.9 (−3.4)	12.6 (−10.8)	34.8 (1.6)
Source: NOAA (relative humidity and dew point 1961–1990)

== Demographics ==
Historical population
Census	Pop.	Note	%±
1860	1,424		—
1870	3,953		177.6%
1880	5,103		29.1%
1890	5,321		4.3%
1900	6,843		28.6%
1910	7,844		14.6%
1920	13,722		74.9%
1930	20,621		50.3%
1940	28,312		37.3%
1950	29,885		5.6%
1960	40,663		36.1%
1970	53,766		32.2%
1980	57,890		7.7%
1990	70,745		22.2%
2000	85,806		21.3%
2010	106,769		24.4%
2020	121,395		13.7%
2025 (est.)	124,292		2.4%
U.S. Decennial Census; 2020 Census

As of the 2024 American Community Survey, there are 51,882 estimated households in Rochester with an average of 2.33 persons per household. The city has a median household income of $90,020. Approximately 6.4% of the city's population lives at or below the poverty line. Rochester has an estimated 69.9% employment rate, with 53.5% of the population holding a bachelor's degree or higher and 95.8% holding a high school diploma. There were 56,179 housing units at an average density of 988.95 per square mile (381.8/km^{2}).

The top five reported languages (people were allowed to report up to two languages, thus the figures will generally add to more than 100%) were English (86.2%), Spanish (3.8%), Indo-European (2.6%), Asian and Pacific Islander (4.3%), and Other (3.1%).

The median age in the city was 37.0 years.

Rochester, Minnesota – racial and ethnic composition Note: the US Census treats Hispanic/Latino as an ethnic category. This table excludes Latinos from the racial categories and assigns them to a separate category. Hispanics/Latinos may be of any race.
Race / ethnicity (NH = non-Hispanic)
Race / ethnicity (NH = non-Hispanic)	Population 1990		Population 2000		Population 2010		Population 2020	
Race / ethnicity (NH = non-Hispanic)	Number	Percent	Number	Percent	Number	Percent	Number	Percent
White alone (NH)	66,125	93.47%	73,656	85.84%	84,608	79.24%	87,180	71.82%
Black or African American alone (NH)	708	1.00%	3,034	3.54%	6,586	6.17%	10,661	8.78%
Native American or Alaska Native alone (NH)	203	0.29%	232	0.27%	251	0.24%	323	0.27%
Asian alone (NH)	2,849	4.03%	4,796	5.59%	7,212	6.76%	9,469	7.80%
Pacific Islander alone (NH)	—	—	32	0.04%	38	0.04%	56	0.05%
Other race alone (NH)	38	0.05%	103	0.12%	212	0.20%	429	0.35%
Mixed race or multiracial (NH)	—	—	1,388	1.62%	2,354	2.21%	5,293	4.36%
Hispanic or Latino (any race)	822	1.16%	2,565	2.99%	5,508	5.16%	7,984	6.58%
Total	70,745	100.00%	85,806	100.00%	106,769	100.00%	121,395	100.00%

=== 2020 census ===
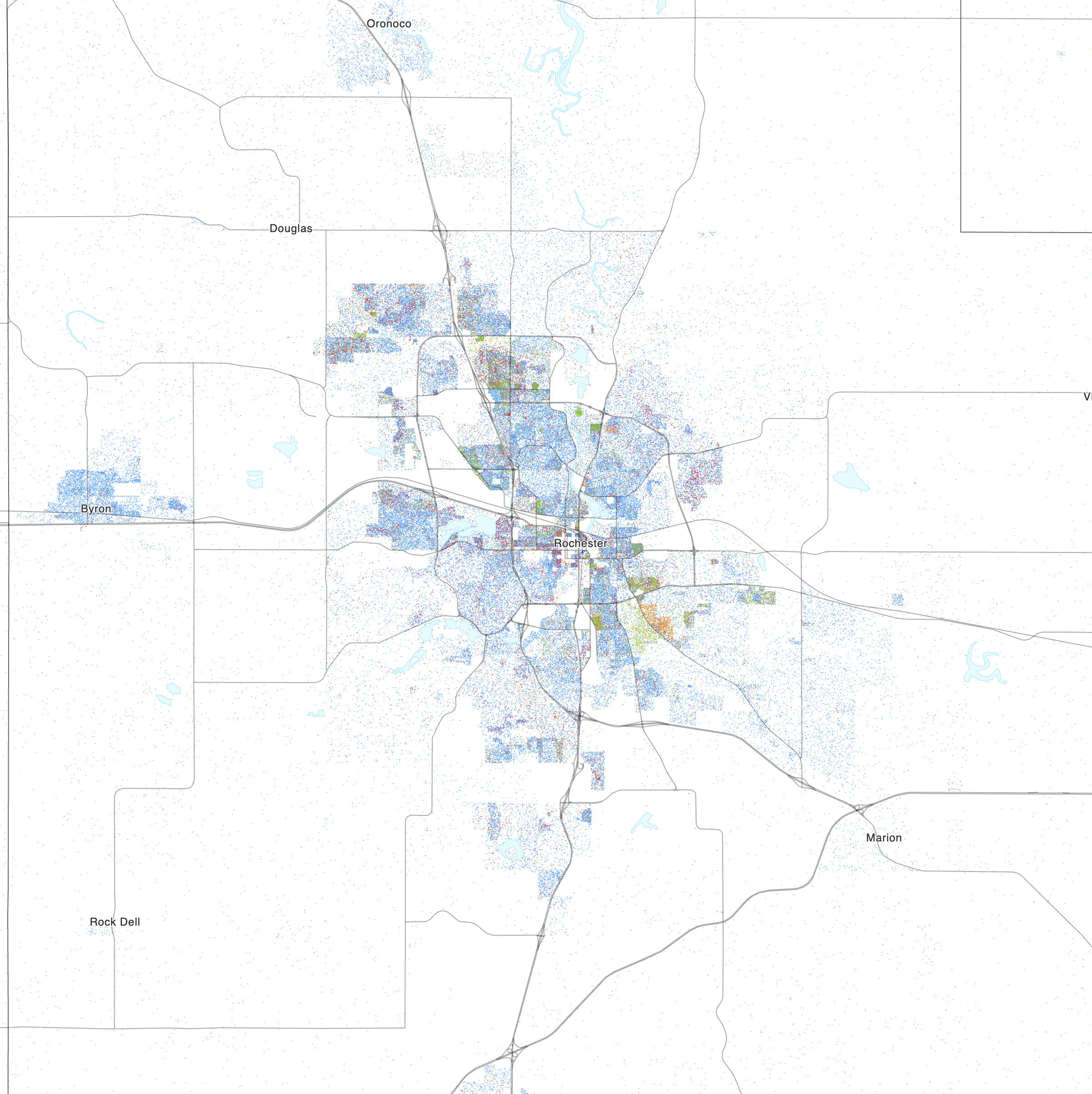
Map of racial distribution in Rochester, 2020 U.S. census. Each dot is one person: ⬤ White ⬤ Black ⬤ Asian ⬤ Hispanic ⬤ Multiracial ⬤ Native American/Other

As of the 2020 census, there were 121,395 people, 49,904 households, and 29,487 families residing in the city. The population density was 2,187.46 inhabitants per square mile (844.6/km^{2}). There were 53,210 housing units at an average density of 958.81 per square mile (370.2/km^{2}). The racial makeup of the city was 73.23% White, 8.89% African American, 0.44% Native American, 7.86% Asian, 0.06% Pacific Islander, 2.93% from some other races and 6.60% from two or more races. Hispanic or Latino people of any race were 6.58% of the population.

=== 2010 census ===
As of the 2010 census, there were 106,769 people, 43,025 households, and 26,853 families residing in the city. The population density was 1,955.83 inhabitants per square mile (755.2/km^{2}). There were 45,683 housing units at an average density of 836.84 per square mile (323.1/km^{2}). The racial makeup of the city was 81.95% White, 6.28% African American, 0.28% Native American, 6.79% Asian, 0.04% Pacific Islander, 2.05% from some other races and 2.61% from two or more races. Hispanic or Latino people of any race were 5.16% of the population.

There were 43,025 households of which 31.9% had children under the age of 18 living with them, 49.4% were married couples living together, 9.5% had a female householder with no husband present, 3.5% had a male householder with no wife present, and 37.6% were non-families. 30.1% of all households were made up of individuals and 8.8% had someone living alone who was 65 years of age or older. The average household size was 2.42 and the average family size was 3.04.

The median age in the city was 35 years. 24.8% of residents were under the age of 18; 8.3% were between the ages of 18 and 24; 29.4% were from 25 to 44; 24.8% were from 45 to 64; and 12.7% were 65 years of age or older. The gender makeup of the city was 48.4% male and 51.6% female.

== Economy ==
Mayo Clinic forms the core of Rochester's economy. As of 2016, it employs 51,000 people and draws more than 2 million visitors annually. The clinic's many facilities, along with hotels, restaurants and retail stores, comprise nearly all of the city's downtown. Excluding the state government, Mayo Clinic is the largest employer in Minnesota. Other care providers, including the Rochester Federal Medical Center, are significant employers.

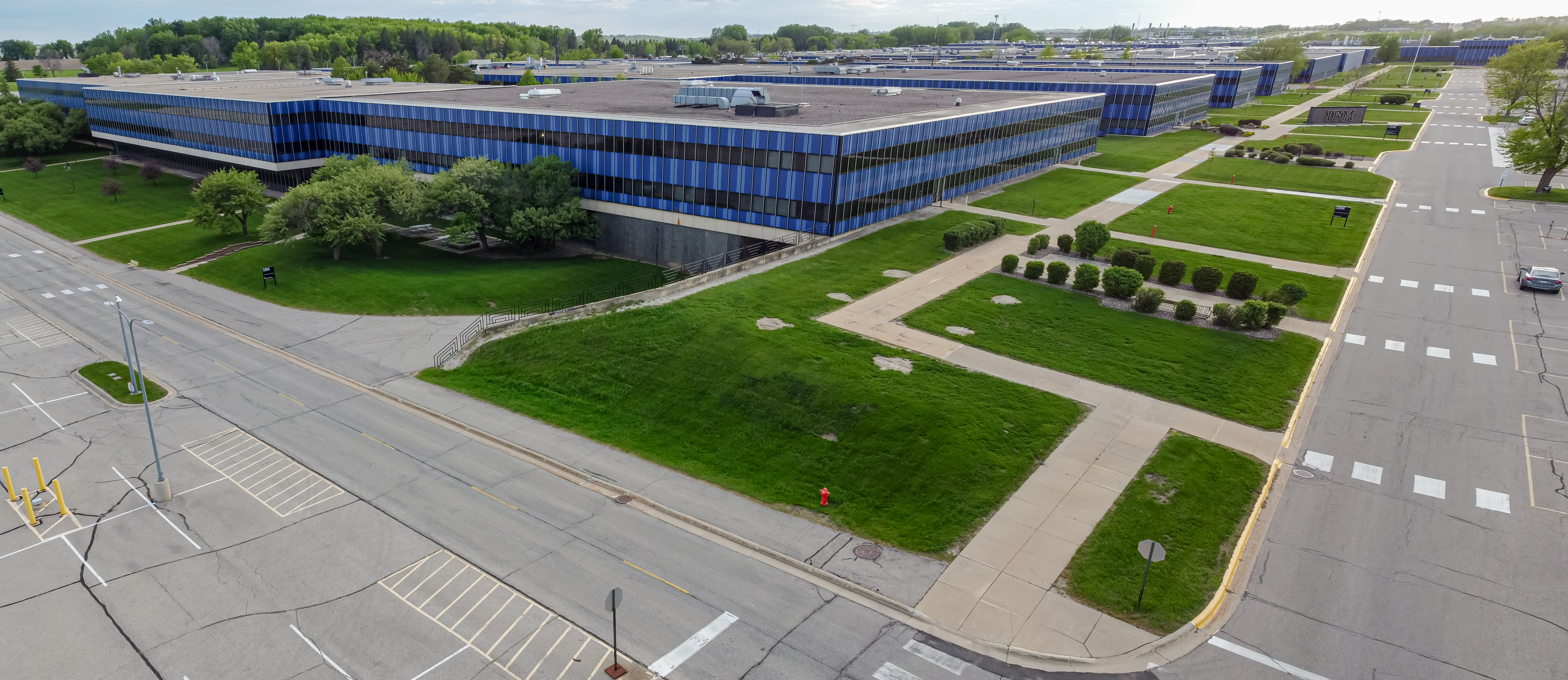
IBM Rochester campus

The Rochester Technology Campus is a sprawling 2.56 million sq. ft. leasable facility with uses ranging from office space, manufacturing, warehousing, data centers, and laboratories. It has been home to several technology companies. This is where IBM designed and produced its midrange computer series. It was also the home of the first Blue Gene prototype and contributed the servers for Roadrunner.

The economy of Rochester is also influenced by the agricultural nature of the region. There are multiple dairy producers that are active in the area. In addition, Kerry Flavours and Ingredients, a subsidiary of the global Irish company called Kerry Group, maintains a production plant in Rochester that specializes in fermented ingredients, found in breads, meats and other processed foods.

Number	Employer	Number of Employees
1	Mayo Clinic	51,000
2	Rochester Public Schools	2,872
3	IBM	2,791
4	Olmsted County	1,371
5	Olmsted Medical Center	1,321
6	City of Rochester	1,166
7	McNeilus Truck & Manuf.	791
8	Benchmark Electronics	625
9	Spectrum	577
10	Rochester Community and Technical College	492
11	McNeilus Steel, Inc.	490
12	Federal Medical Center, Rochester	452
13	Crenlo	450
14	Cardinal of Minnesota	425
15	Reichel Foods	423
16	Geotek	417
17	Halcon	400

=== Destination Medical Center ===
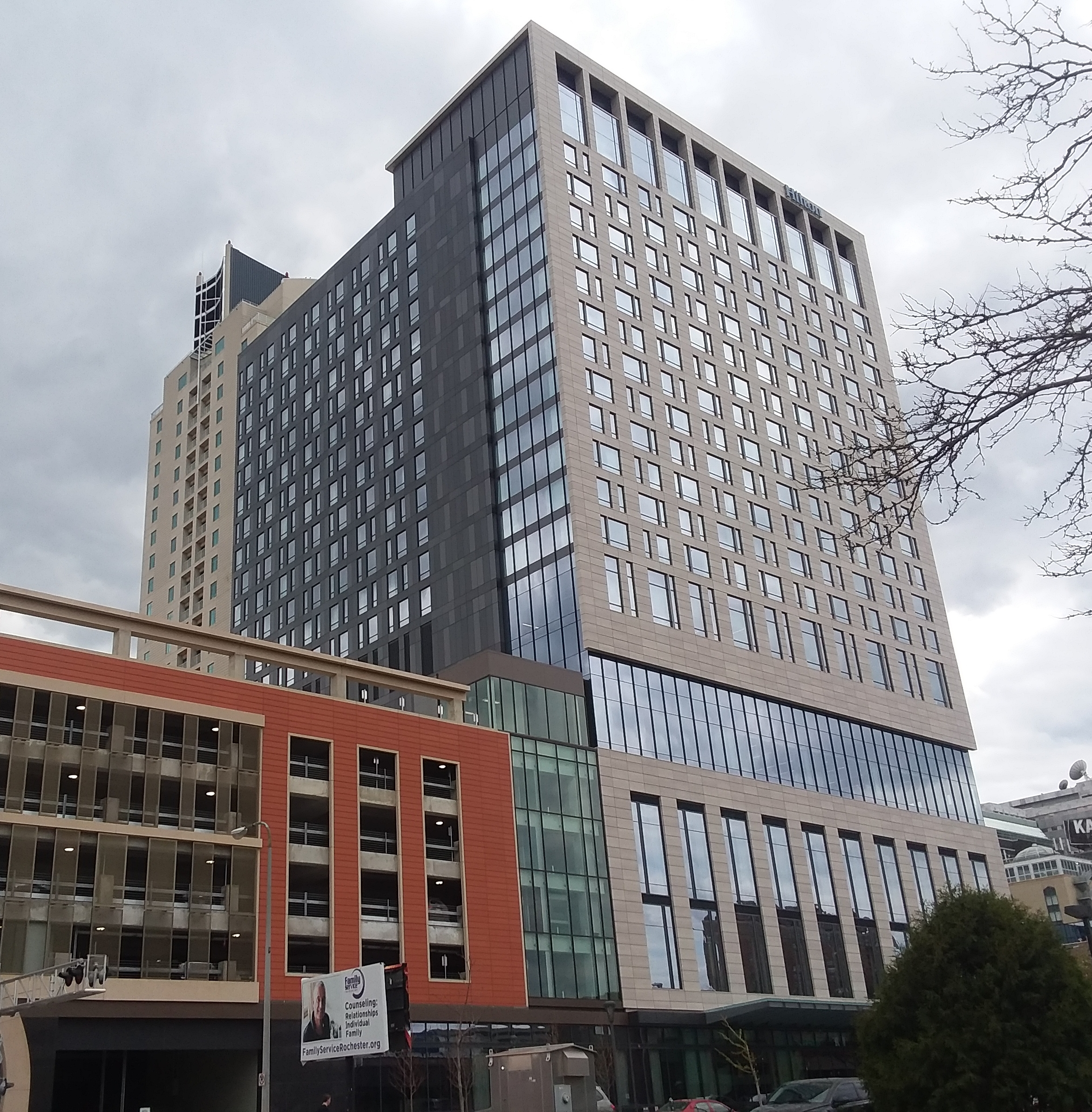
Downtown Hilton, completed in 2019, is one of the first major DMC projects.

In 2013, Governor Mark Dayton signed a bill known as Destination Medical Center (DMC). It intends to increase Minnesota's tax base, and promote business and economic growth throughout the state. Because of this legislation, The Mayo Clinic will invest in $3.5 billion to upgrade patient rooms, add additional workspace, and build research and administrative buildings.

The main developments of this plan will be in the DMC sub-districts. The Downtown Waterfront district will cover The Government Center, The Civic Center, and most areas near the Zumbro River. The Central Station district includes Central Park and most of Civic Center Drive, aimed to become a transportation hub of the city. St. Marys Place will cover St. Marys hospital and St. Marys Park, as well as most of 2nd Street. The Heart of the City will feature the Mayo Clinic campus and major residential, commercial, and retail companies. The Discovery Square area will include scientific and technology research facilities. Lastly, The UMR and Recreation district will feature Soldiers Field and the University of Minnesota Rochester campus.

== Arts and culture ==
A number of Rochester buildings are on the National Register of Historic Places, including the historic Chateau Theatre, which the city purchased in 2015 for preservation, and Avalon Music, formerly a hotel important in the local civil rights movement. In 2019, after renovations and a public RFP, the Chateau Theatre has re-opened as an exhibition venue.

Founded in 1946, the Rochester Art Center is located downtown, just south of the Mayo Civic Center. In 2017, the Rochester Art Center's financial troubles brought a renewed focus on the need for both formal and informal arts spaces in the city.

In the summer from June to the end of August, every Thursday the city puts on Thursdays Downtown where local restaurants and artists can set up booths all along First Avenue downtown Rochester. There are two stages where bands perform and provide entertainment. There are also a number of street musicians sitting on walls or standing on the sidewalks.

The oldest cultural arts institution in the community, Rochester Symphony Orchestra & Chorale was founded in 1919 as a professional performing arts organization called the Rochester Orchestra. Its earliest ensemble, the Lawler-Dodge Orchestra, was founded in 1912 as a volunteer orchestra, driven by Daisy Plummer, wife of Mayo Clinic physician, Dr. Henry Plummer, and directed by Harold Cooke. In the early years, the Orchestra appeared in the former Chateau Theatre where they performed background music for silent movies.

Carpet Booth Studios, a music and audio recording and production studio, opened in 2017 and has found success with both independent and label artists from the Minnesota music scene and beyond. Gold and platinum records with artists like Yung Gravy and Lil Wayne, character dialogue for The Simpsons, and award-winning and charting albums like "Music is Medicine" with Dr. Elvis Francois have all been recorded in Rochester at Carpet Booth Studios with owner Zach Zurn.

Pop's Art Theater, an independent movie theater, opened in 2023, following the closure of Grey Duck Theater in the same space.

Rochester also houses the Rochester Public Library near the Civic Center. It is one of the largest libraries in the area and has been awarded the National Medal for Museum and Library Service in 2018.

== Sports ==
Team	League	Venue
Rochester Honkers	Northwoods League, Baseball	Mayo Field
Rochester Grizzlies	NA3HL, Ice Hockey	Rochester Recreation Center
Med City Freeze	Southern Plains Football League, Semi-Pro Football	Rochester Regional Stadium
Rochester FC	USL League Two, Soccer	Rochester Regional Stadium at Rochester Community and Technical College

== Parks and recreation ==
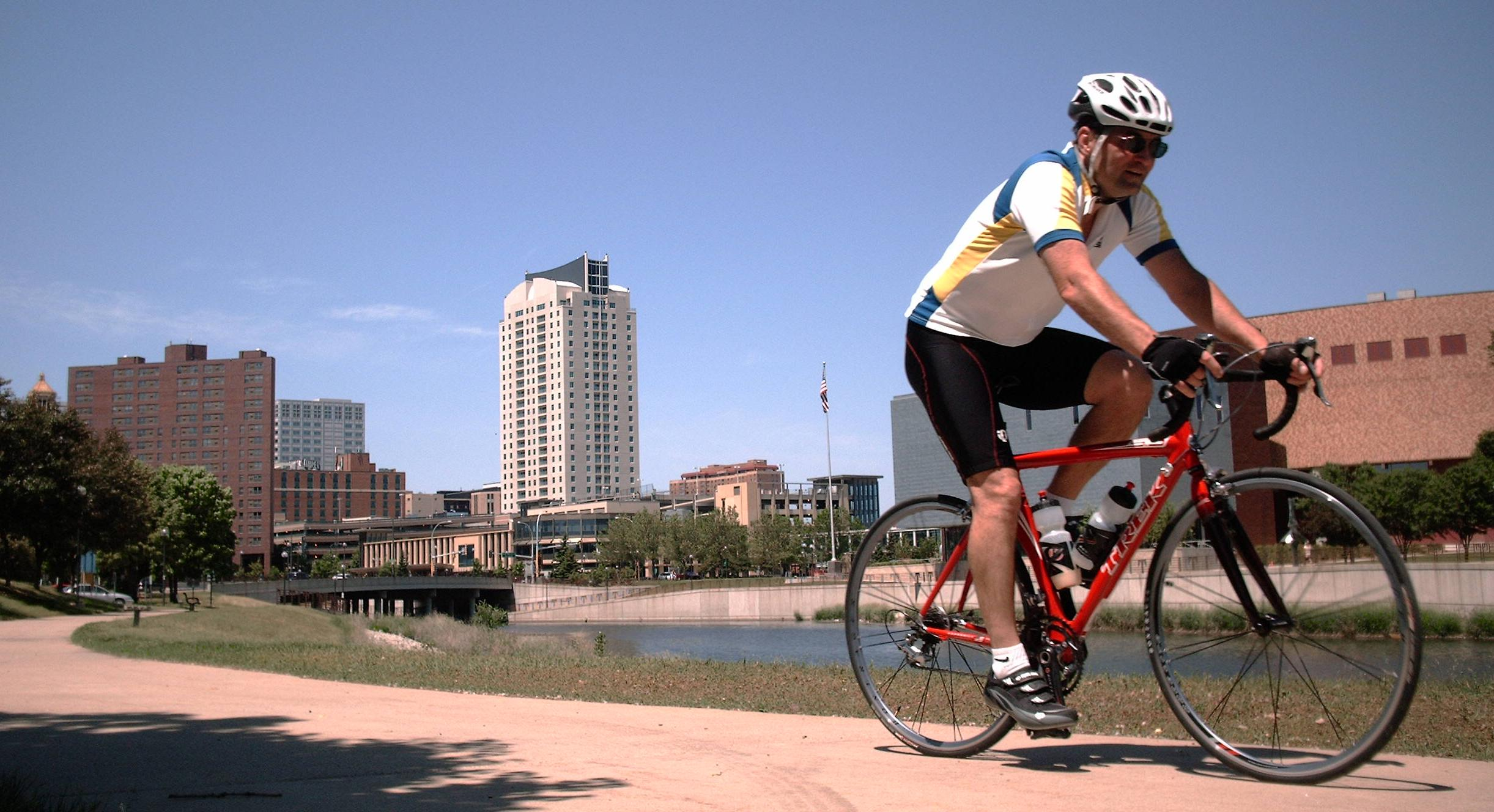
Rochester has an extensive network of bike and pedestrian paths.

Rochester's city park system has more than 100 sites covering 5 square miles (13 km^{2}), including parks located along Bear Creek and South Fork Zumbro rivers. The city also maintains 85 miles (137 km) of paved trails.

The city also maintains four public golf courses: Northern Hills, Eastwood Golf Club, Hadley Creek, and Soldiers Field Golf Course located downtown. In addition, a number of private courses are located in the Rochester area, including Willow Creek Golf Club, Oak Summit Golf Club, and the Rochester Golf and Country Club along with a number of courses in smaller surrounding communities. The city of Rochester has also started the bike share program for its community members where the registered members and visitors can rent a bike for free through one of its bike share locations at Rochester Public Library, Peace Plaza or Rochester City Hall.

=== Quarry Hill ===
The foundation of Rochester State Hospital began in 1875 as the Minnesota Inebriate Asylum funded by a tax on liquor dealers. Land was purchased in 1876 and construction began in 1877, including the building of a hospital and the park nearby which was used by the patients and their families. In 1965, the park was transferred from the hospital to the state for the use of general public and since then there have been various developments in the park including the laying of paved trails. The 329-acre (133 ha) park contains over 8 mi (13 km) of paved and hiking trails, a pond, and a historical sandstone cave carved in 1882. This soft St. Peter sand stone cave was dug in the late 1800s to store food for the patients of the state hospital. The cave was later abandoned with the invention of modern refrigerators, and is now a historic site.

Quarry Hill Nature Center is the center stone of the Quarry Hill Park in Rochester. The Nature Center opened in 1973 and was expanded in 1990. In 2017, the facility added additional Nordic skiing. These facilities include modern educational facilities, and a 19th-century prairie style home where skis and snow shoes could be rented.

Quarry Hill Oak Savana

== Government and politics ==
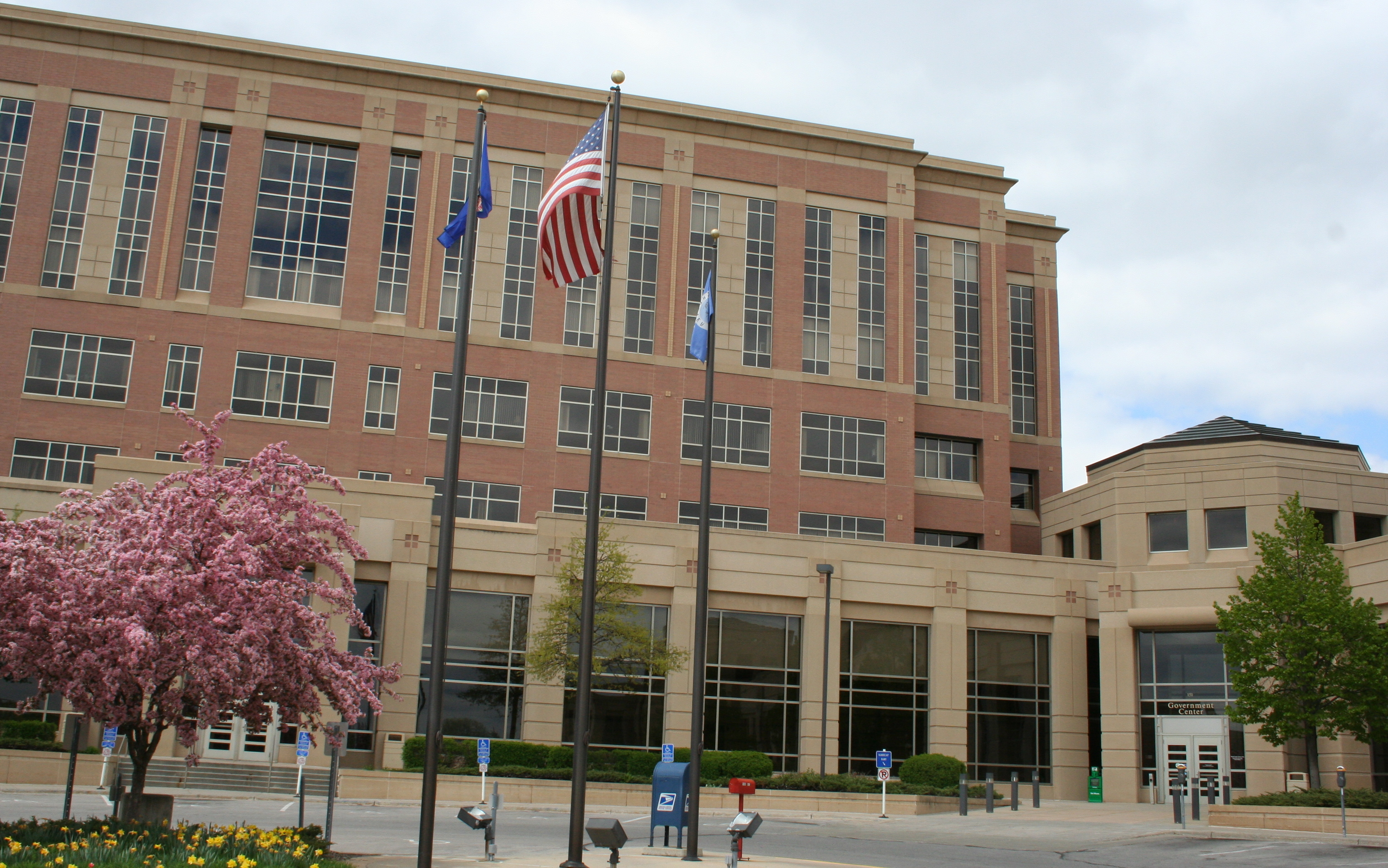
Government Center Building

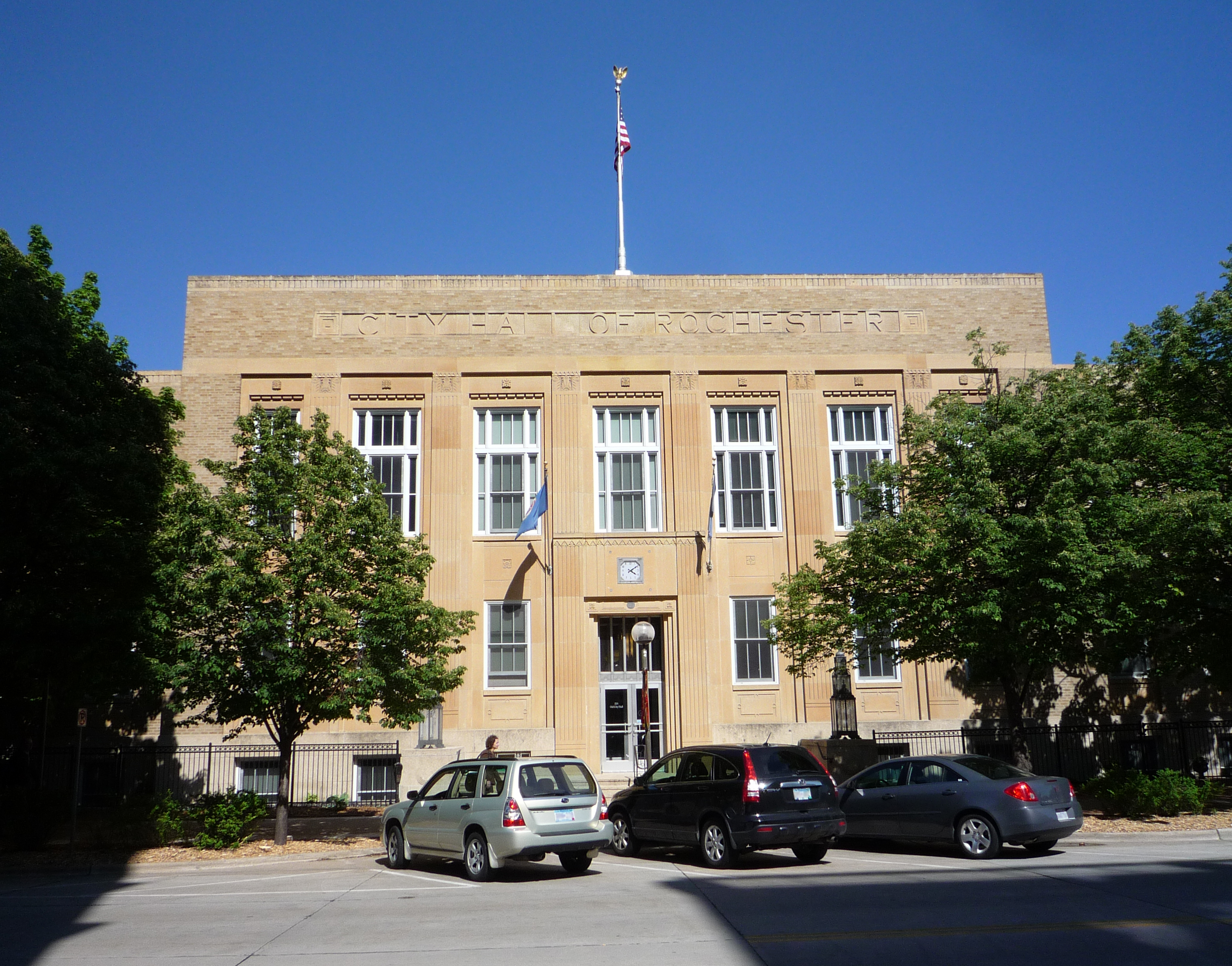
Old City Hall

Rochester is governed by a mayor-council government with a seven-member city council. The current mayor is Kim Norton. As of July 2025, the city council comprises: Randy Schubring, City Council President; Patrick Keane, 1st Ward; Nick Miller, 2nd Ward; Norman Wahl, 3rd Ward; Andy Friederichs, 4th Ward; Shaun Palmer, 5th Ward; and Dan Doering, 6th Ward.

All municipal elected offices in Rochester are non-partisan, as stated in the city's charter.

2020 Presidential Election by Precinct Biden: 40–50% 50–60% 60–70% 70–80% Trump: 40–50% 50–60%

Rochester is the seat of Olmsted County, run by a seven-member elected county board, each representing district residents. The County Board of Commissioners oversee county operations and address citizen concerns. When a commissioner is elected, they are elected to serve a 4-year term. When that term ends, the commissioner can run for re-election if they so desire. The County Attorney and the County Sheriff are also elected to 4-year terms and can run for re-election when the term expires if they choose. Each of these elected officials acts as the director for his/her office, and are accountable to the residents of Olmsted County.

Rochester falls under the Olmsted County District Court within the Third Judicial District of the State of Minnesota.

The city includes parts of Minnesota state legislative districts 25 and 26. In the Minnesota House of Representatives, District 25A is represented by Duane Quam (R), District 25B is represented by Andy Smith (DFL), District 26A is represented by Tina Liebling (DFL), and District 26B is represented by Nels Pierson (R). In the Minnesota Senate, Rochester is represented by Liz Boldon (DFL) and Carla Nelson, (R). Rochester is located in Minnesota's 1st congressional district, represented by Brad Finstad, a member of the Republican Party.

Rochester continues to trend Democratic in local and federal elections which has resulted in Olmsted County also seeing a shifting electorate. In the 2020 presidential election President Joe Biden obtained nearly 60% of the vote in the city, the highest vote total for a Democratic candidate in history.

Presidential election results 1960–2024

Precinct General Election Results
Year	Republican	Democratic	Third parties
2024	37.8% 24,524	59.5% 38,588	2.7% 1,732
2020	38.2% 25,210	59.4% 39,202	2.4% 1,621
2016	39.8% 22,944	49.7% 28,611	10.5% 6,044
2012	44.1% 24,973	53.1% 30,093	2.8% 1,583
2008	44.4% 24,102	53.6% 29,038	2.0% 1,078
2004	50.0% 24,711	48.7% 24,041	1.3% 644
2000	49.9% 19,954	45.3% 18,123	4.8% 1,942
1996	44.2% 15,055	46.2% 15,716	9.6% 3,286
1992	41.8% 15,734	35.5% 13,348	22.7% 8,548
1988	57.9% 17,997	42.1% 13,064	0.0% 0
1984	62.1% 18,168	37.9% 11,066	0.0% 0
1980	54.0% 14,155	35.2% 9,210	10.8% 2,840
1976	62.5% 16,064	35.8% 9,196	1.7% 445
1972	69.7% 15,882	28.2% 6,419	2.1% 496
1968	55.3% 11,294	42.0% 8,571	2.7% 559
1964	45.4% 8,297	54.4% 9,945	0.2% 46
1960	60.9% 10,224	38.8% 6,521	0.3% 56

=== US House of Representatives ===
Name	Congressional District	Assumed office	Party
Brad Finstad	1st District	2022	Republican

=== Minnesota Senate ===
Name	District	Assumed office	Party
Carla Nelson	District 24	2011	Republican
Liz Boldon	District 25	2023	DFL

=== Minnesota House of Representatives ===
Name	District	Assumed office	Party
Duane Quam	District 24A	2011	Republican
Tina Liebling	District 24B	2005	DFL
Kim Hicks	District 25A	2023	DFL
Andy Smith	District 25B	2023	DFL

== Education ==
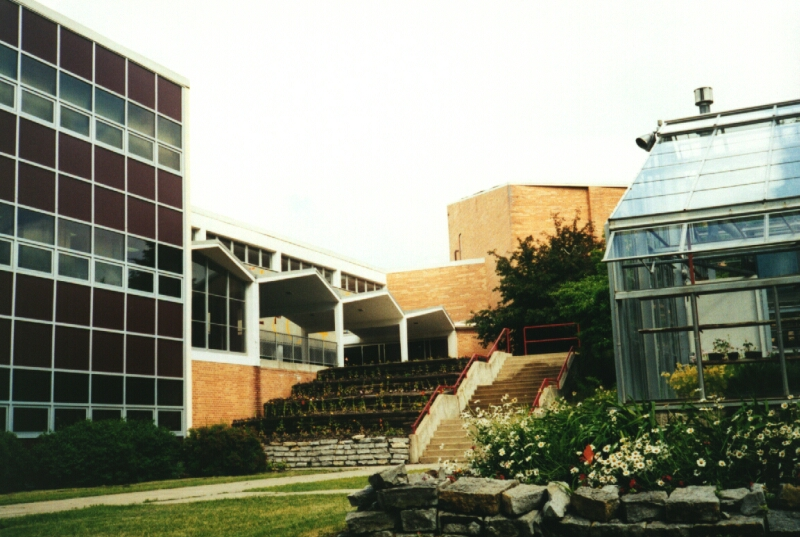
Courtyard and greenhouse of John Marshall Senior High School

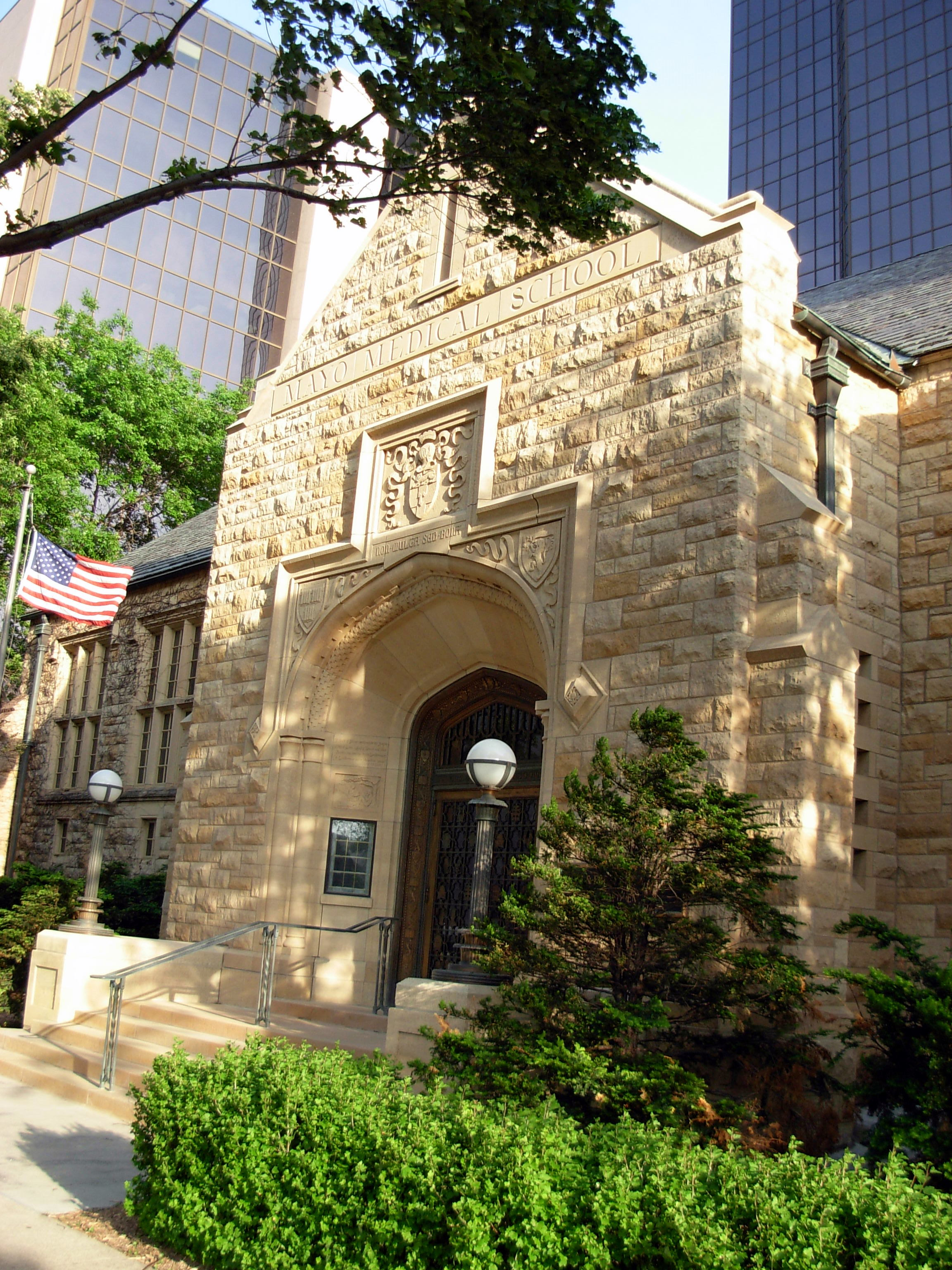
Mayo Clinic Alix School of Medicine

Rochester Public Schools enroll 16,300 students in 23 public primary and secondary schools. The city is divided into three public high school attendance zones: John Marshall, Mayo and Century. Private schools in the city include Lourdes, Schaeffer Academy, and Rochester Central Lutheran School amongst various smaller private religious schools. Studio Academy, a fine arts-focused charter school operated for 10 years in Rochester and closed its doors in 2011 upon losing its charter. The Rochester STEM Academy opened in 2011, occupying the former Studio Academy building.

Higher education in Rochester had been concentrated around the former University Center Rochester in the city's southeast outskirts, where Rochester Community and Technical College shares a campus with a branch of Winona State University. The University of Minnesota offered degrees through UCR until 2007, when the University of Minnesota Rochester was established downtown. Branches of Augsburg University and College of St. Scholastica are also in Rochester, as are branches of Winona State University and St. Mary's University. The Mayo Clinic offers graduate medical education and research programs through the Mayo Clinic Alix School of Medicine, Mayo Clinic Graduate School of Biomedical Sciences, and the Mayo Clinic School of Health Sciences.

According to the United States Census Bureau 2011–2015, the number of high school graduates or higher, percent of persons age 25 years+ was 94.1%. The number of bachelor's degree or higher percent of persons age 25+ was 41.3%.

== Media ==
The city newspaper is the Post-Bulletin, an afternoon paper which publishes Monday through Saturday. The Post-Bulletin company also publishes Rochester Magazine, a monthly features periodical.

There are four television stations based in Rochester: KTTC channel 10 (NBC, CW on 10.2), and KXLT-TV channel 47 (Fox), which are a duopoly. ABC affiliate KAAL (channel 6) and CBS affiliate KIMT (channel 3) are also based in Rochester. Channel 15 KSMQ (PBS) in Austin and channel 24 KYIN (PBS) in Mason City are among the stations that serve the market. KAAL is licensed to Austin and KIMT is licensed to Mason City, but both maintain studios in Rochester. KIMT opened its studio in Rochester in late 2017, and it now serves as the main location for their newscasts.

The Rochester area is provided cable service by Charter Communications, which holds a monopoly in the area. Indiana-based Metronet is currently in the process of developing the fiber-optic network to provide cable service to Rochester.

== Transportation ==
Rochester is served by three U.S. highways (U.S. 14, U.S. 52, and U.S. 63), and the southern edge of Rochester is skirted by Interstate 90 and State Highway 30. Olmsted County Highway 22 is also a main highway in the city. A combination of skyways and subterranean walkways link most downtown buildings, which residents often use to avoid harsh winter weather conditions. Public bus transit is run by Rochester Public Transit, which contracts out its operations to First Transit. The City of Rochester has several bicycle trails and equips its buses with carriers.

Rochester International Airport is located seven miles (11 km) south of downtown. The airport is the second busiest commercial airport in Minnesota. It has direct flights to Atlanta, Chicago, Denver, and Minneapolis, with occasional charter flights servicing Riverside Resort in Laughlin, Nevada. Nonstop flights to Phoenix and Fort Myers were scheduled to begin in early 2022.

Rochester has a shuttle service connecting to the Minneapolis St. Paul International Airport by Rochester Shuttle Service and Groome Transportation (formerly Go Rochester Direct).

Rochester's last passenger rail service, to Chicago to the southeast and Rapid City, South Dakota to the west, ended when the Chicago and North Western Railway's Rochester 400 streamliner ended service in 1963. The closest Amtrak station is at Winona, Minnesota, 45 miles (72 km) to the east. Travelers are able to purchase tickets from Amtrak for a shuttle bus that connects with the daily Empire Builder at La Crosse, Wisconsin.

A 2.6 mi (4.2 km) bus rapid transit line, known as Link, is scheduled to open in August 2027 with seven stations along 2nd Street Southwest. It will be the first bus rapid transit line in Minnesota outside the Twin Cities. The $196.7 million project was funded by a federal grant and other state sources.

=== Major highways ===
- US 14 – U.S. Route 14
- US 52 – U.S. Route 52
- US 63 – U.S. Route 63
- I-90 – Interstate 90
- MN 30 – Minnesota State Highway 30

== See also ==
- List of people from Rochester, Minnesota
- List of tallest buildings in Rochester, Minnesota

== General and cited sources ==
- Faruque, Cathleen Jo. "Migration of Hmong to Rochester, Minnesota: Life in the Midwest" (Archive). In: Hmong Studies Journal; 2003. 50 pages.
