= Oakwood Cemetery (Rochester, Minnesota) =

Historic cemetery in Rochester, Minnesota

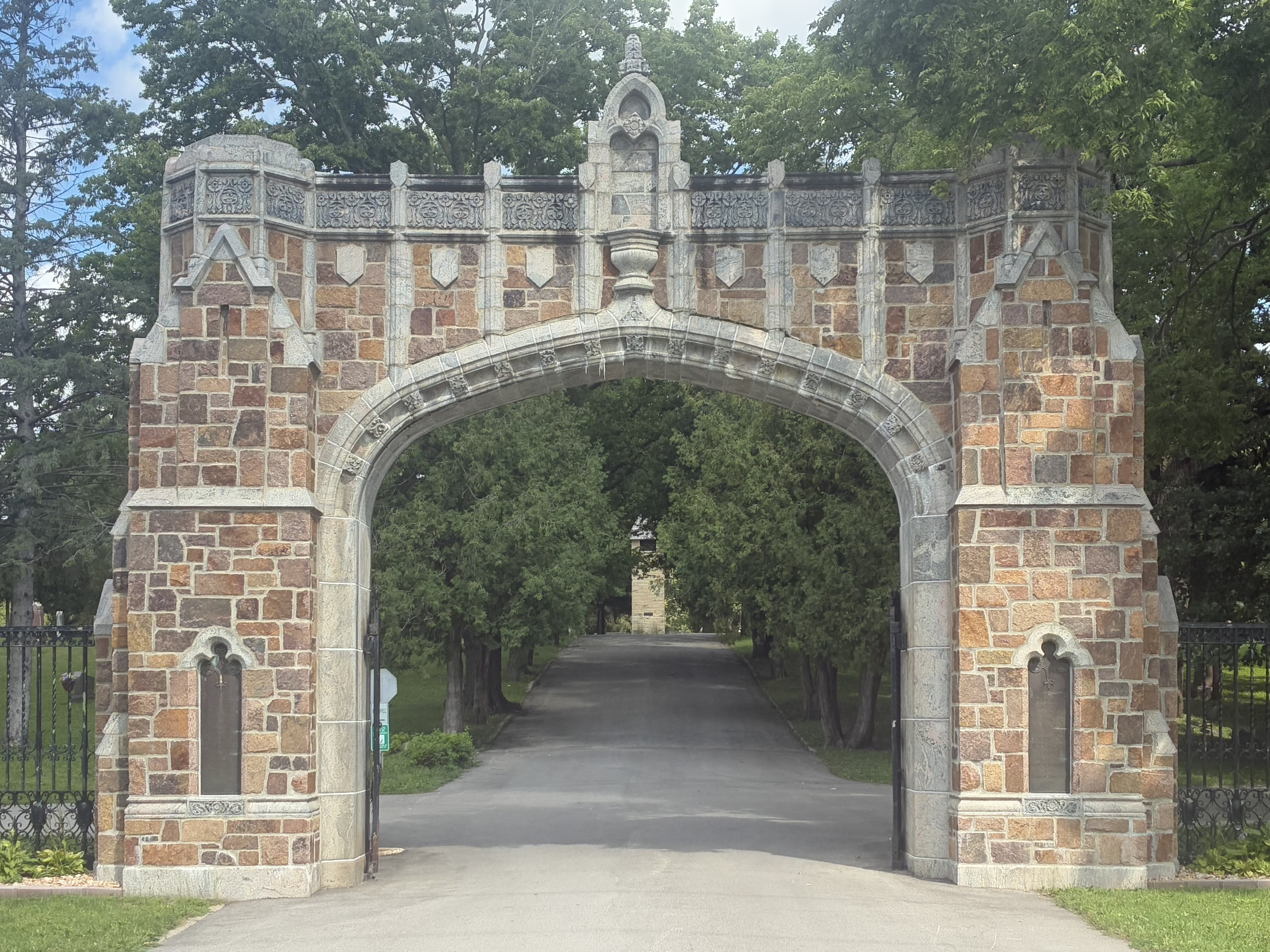
- Interactive map of Oakwood Cemetery

Details
- Established: 1863; 163 years ago
- Location: 41 7th Ave NE; Rochester, Minnesota
- Country: United States
- Coordinates: 44.02720°N 92.45580°W
- Type: Nonprofit
- Owned by: Rochester Cemetery Association
- No. of interments: 19,000+
- Website: oakwoodcemeteries.com
- Find a Grave: Oakwood Cemetery
- The Political Graveyard: Oakwood Cemetery

Oakwood Cemetery is a historic cemetery in Rochester, Minnesota. Established in 1863, it was one of the first cemeteries in Rochester and serves as the resting place for many early pioneer settlers of the city.

== History ==
Prior to the formation of Oakwood Cemetery, there was an informal plot used as a burial ground for the people of Rochester, but it soon became apparent in the ever-growing city that a larger, longer lasting place was necessary. Accordingly, Oakwood Cemetery was established in 1863, the first official cemetery of Rochester.

Their mission, as stated, was to create "a non-denominational, nonprofit, lot-owner operated corporation to establish a final resting place as desired by the people of Rochester and surrounding areas."

The organization that manages the cemetery, Rochester Cemetery Association, also maintains a newer, rural cemetery in Rochester, Oakwood East Cemetery, established in 1999 to address the issue of limited remaining space in Oakwood Cemetery.

== Architecture ==
The gateway at the main entrance to the cemetery was completed in 1929 at the cost of $34,000. It was built as a memorial to Granville Woodworth, an early pioneer settler and contractor of Rochester, who was also a longtime trustee of the cemetery. The structure was designed by Ellerbe & Company. The main body and wings were constructed of seam-face granite, while the ornamental adornments were of rainbow granite from a quarry in western Minnesota. The gates were made of wrought iron.

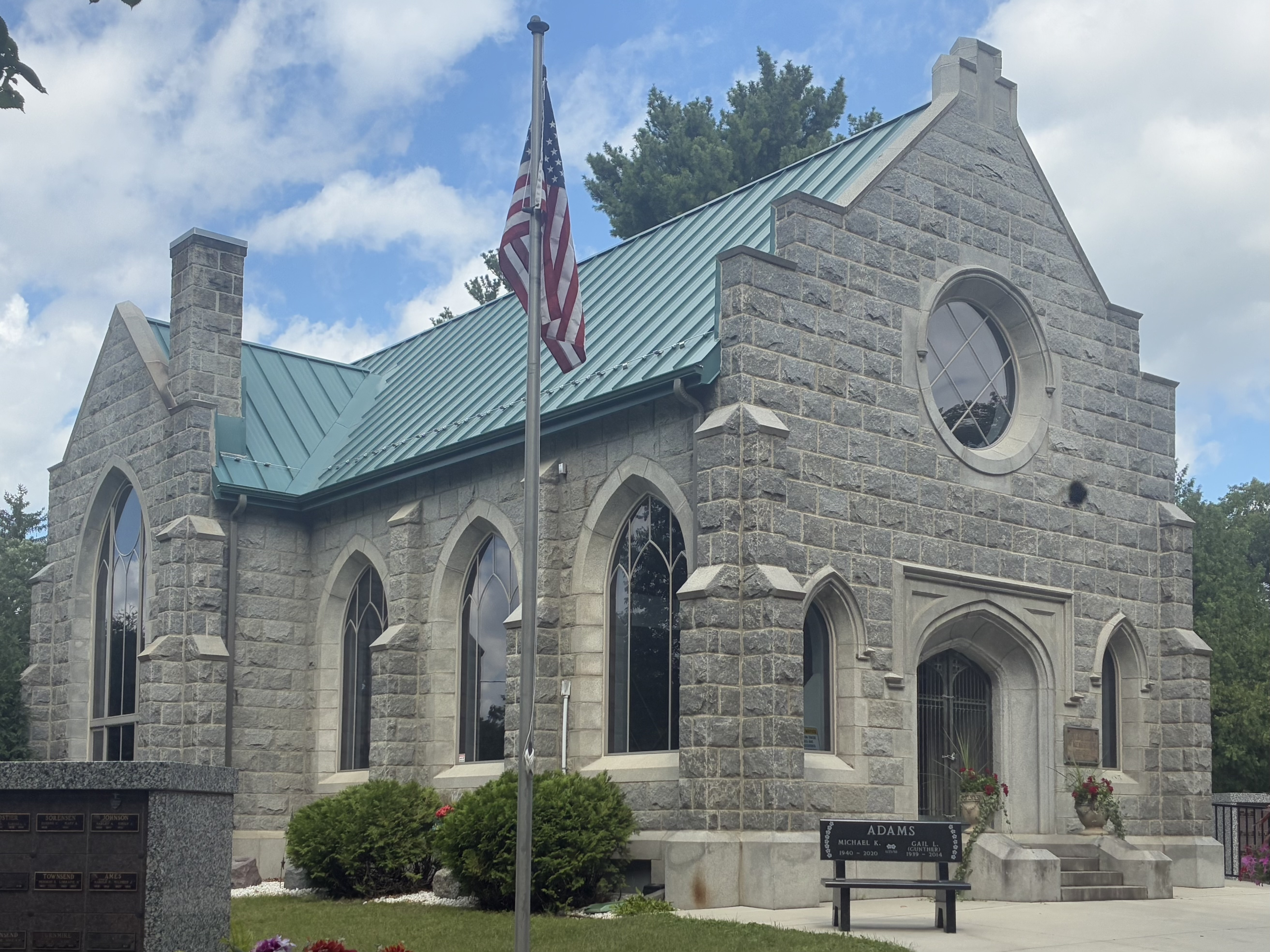
Oakwood Cemetery chapel

Within the cemetery, there is also a historic chapel on the grounds, dating back to the early 20th century, which was designed by Garfield Schwartz. In 1912, when construction was finished, it was described as "an ornament to the city of the dead" and "one of the finest to be found". The interior of the chapel was fashioned in the Gothic style with an oak ceiling and an antique organ. The exterior was built with granite and decorated with stained glass windows. The chapel was dedicated in memory of Colonel George Healy, the first president of the Rochester Cemetery Association and a prominent figure in the cemetery's history.

== Notable interments ==
- Chuck Canfield (1932–2017), mayor of Rochester
- Harold Crawford (1888–1981), architect
- Allen J. Furlow (1890–1954), lawyer and politician
- Philip Showalter Hench (1896–1965), physician, Nobel Prize recipient
- Edward Calvin Kendall (1886–1972), biochemist, Nobel Prize recipient
- Charles Horace Mayo (1865–1939), physician, co-founder of the Mayo Clinic
- William James Mayo (1861–1939), physician, co-founder of the Mayo Clinic
- William Worrall Mayo (1819–1911), physician, mayor of Rochester
- Abram Ozmun (1814–1887), mayor of Rochester
- William B. Richardson (1874–1945), mayor of Rochester
- Charles M. Start (1839–1919), Chief Justice of the Minnesota Supreme Court
- George W. Van Dusen (1826–1915), businessman
- Horace H. Witherstine (1852–1924), mayor of Rochester
