= Van Dusen =

Van Dusen is a surname. Notable people with the surname include:

- Albert E. Van Dusen (1916–1999), American historian
- Chris Van Dusen, American television writer
- Chris Van Dusen, American children's book author and illlustrator
- Clyde Van Dusen (1885–1951), American jockey and Thoroughbred racehorse trainer
  - Clyde Van Dusen (horse) (1926–1948), American Thoroughbred racehorse
- Francis Lund Van Dusen (1912–1993), American judge
- Fred Van Dusen (born 1937), American baseball player
- George W. Van Dusen (1826–?), American businessman
- Granville Van Dusen (born 1944), American actor
- H. V. Van Dusen (died 1903), American civil servant and Los Angeles city council member
- Janine B. Van Dusen, American judge
- Julie Van Dusen, Canadian journalist
- Willis Van Dusen, American mayor

== See also ==
- Augustus S. F. X. Van Dusen, fictional detective
- Callendar–Van Dusen equation
- Van Dusen v. Barrack, United States Supreme Court case
- George W. and Nancy B. Van Dusen House, mansion in Minneapolis, Minnesota, United States
- VanDusen Botanical Garden, botanical garden in Vancouver, British Columbia, Canada
