= Duane Sauke =

American politician from Minnesota

Member of the Minnesota House of Representatives from the 25B district
- In office January 3, 2017 – January 5, 2021
- Preceded by: Kim Norton
- Succeeded by: Liz Boldon

Personal details
- Born: 1948 or 1949 (age 76–77)
- Party: Democratic
- Spouse: Debra (m. 1972)
- Education: Luther College (BA)

Duane Sauke is an American politician who served as a member of the Minnesota House of Representatives from 2017 to 2021. A member of the Minnesota Democratic–Farmer–Labor Party (DFL), he represented District 25B in southeastern Minnesota.

== Early life and education ==
Sauke was raised by sharecroppers in Conger, Minnesota. He attended Luther College in Decorah, Iowa, graduating with a Bachelor of Arts in music education.

== Career ==
He served in the National Guard. He was a band instructor for 17 years for several school districts across southeastern Iowa and later at Elgin Public Schools. He then became a real estate broker, later becoming owner of RE/MAX Rochester, which he sold in 2012.

=== Minnesota House of Representatives ===
Sauke was elected to the Minnesota House of Representatives in 2016 and was reelected for a second term in 2018. He previously ran in District 26B in 1988, losing to Republican incumbent Bob Waltman.

In November 2019, he announced he plans to retire rather than run for re-election in 2020.

== Personal life ==
Sauke married his wife, Debra, in 1972. They have two children and reside in Rochester, Minnesota.
