= Minnesota Monument =

- U.S. National Register of Historic Places
- U.S. Historic district – Contributing property
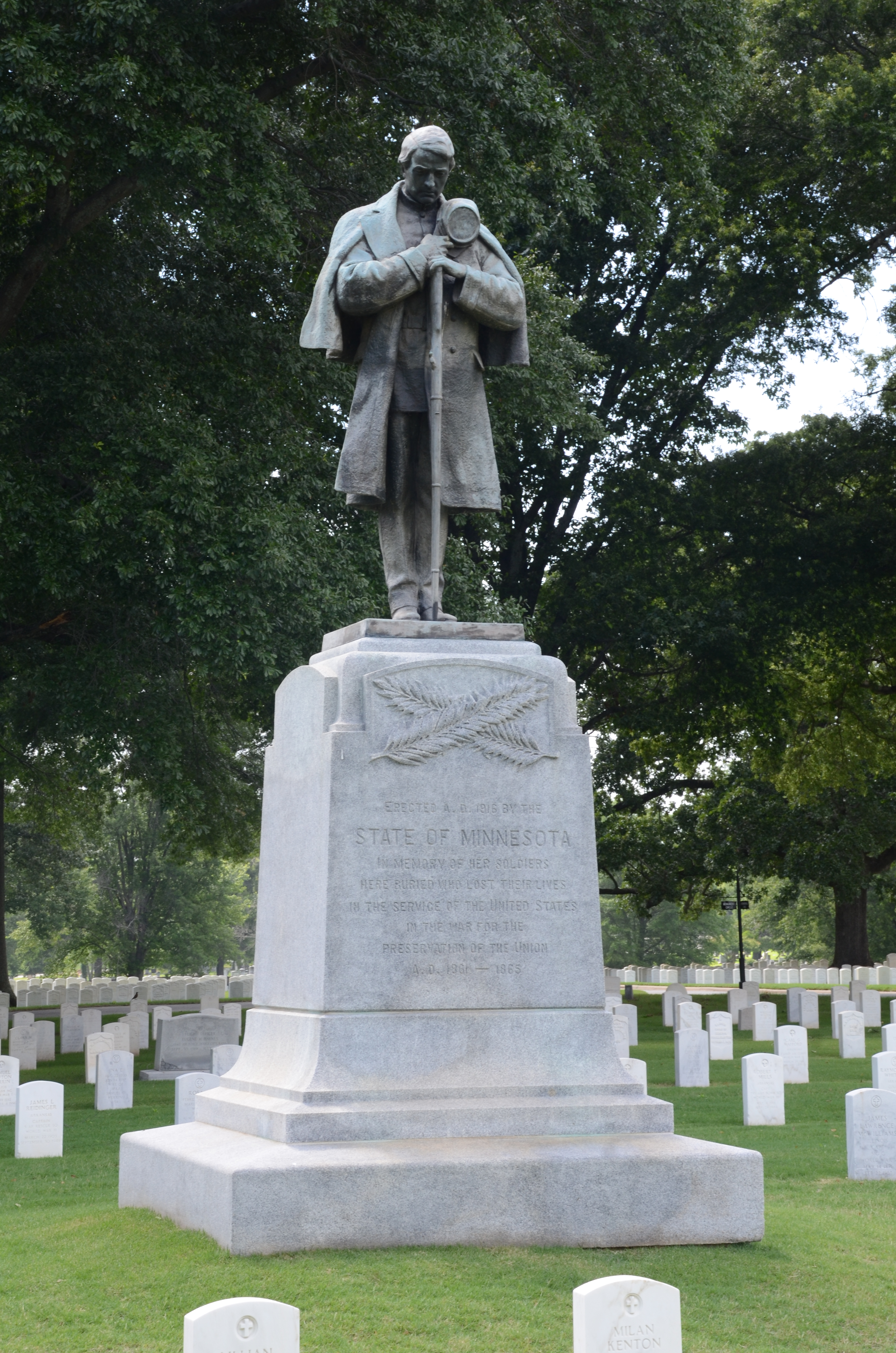

- Location within Arkansas Location within the United States
- Location: 2523 Confederate Blvd., Little Rock, Arkansas
- Coordinates: 34°43′28″N 92°15′25″W
- Area: less than one acre
- Built: 1916
- Sculptor: John Karl Daniels
- Architectural style: Classical Revival
- Part of: Little Rock National Cemetery (ID96001496)
- MPS: Civil War Commemorative Sculpture MPS
- NRHP reference No.: 96000498

Significant dates
- Added to NRHP: May 3, 1996
- Designated CP: December 20, 1996

The Minnesota Monument is an American Civil War memorial in the Little Rock National Cemetery in Little Rock, Arkansas. Also known as "Taps", it depicts a Union Army soldier, his bare head slightly bowed. His hands resting on the butt of his rifle, which is inverted, with the barrel resting on the ground. The bronze sculpture is 7 feet (2.1 m) tall, and is mounted on a granite base about 8 feet (2.4 m) tall. It is dedicated to the 36 soldiers from Minnesota who are buried here. The sculpture was designed by John Karl Daniels, and was funded by the state of Minnesota. It was dedicated in 1916.

The memorial was listed on the National Register of Historic Places in 1996.

== See also ==
- National Register of Historic Places listings in Little Rock, Arkansas
