= Chuck Canfield =

American mayor

45th Mayor of Rochester, Minnesota
- In office January 6, 1995 – January 6, 2003
- Preceded by: Chuck Hazama
- Succeeded by: Ardell Brede

Personal details
- Born: Charles Joseph Canfield; March 24, 1932 Mishawaka, Indiana, U.S.
- Died: January 24, 2017 (aged 84) Rochester, Minnesota, U.S.
- Resting place: Oakwood Cemetery, Rochester, Minnesota, U.S.
- Party: Independent
- Spouse: Gloria B. Olsen
- Children: 4
- Education: Indiana University

Charles Joseph Canfield (March 24, 1932 – January 24, 2017) was a Veteran of the United States Navy and an American businessman. He was a mayor of Rochester, Minnesota. Before being elected mayor in 1995, he was the member of the Rochester City Council for the 2nd Ward for a span which began in 1986. He owned a Shakey's Pizza restaurant in northwest Rochester along US Route 52 since 1967 until its closure in the 2002. He lost the 2002 mayoral election to Ardell Brede.

== 1995 Election ==
Then Rochester Mayor, Chuck Hazama had been scandalized by the NAACP for responding to racism claims by saying that the accusers were newcomers from "East St. Louis and Chicago." Canfield started/announced his campaign for mayor June 6, 1995. His platform was largely based on the rising crime in Rochester. Olmsted County Commissioner Carol Kamper was the primary opponent when Canfield announced his campaign. Canfield said, "There is a criminal element floating into town that puts our neighborhoods in fear and danger." Three days later, Ken R. Weber, the operation manager for the Kahler Hotel's concession business, announced that he would run against Canfield, but a month later he learned because of his probation for committing felony theft he had lost the right to run for mayor. Weber's platform revolved around banning smoking in all indoor, public places. Critical situations manager at IBM Steve Beilby filed to run July 7, making the total candidates a necessary three to demand a primary in September. Beilby had previously lost the 1993 bid for Rochester mayor in the primaries. Before the primaries retired IBM employee, John Reidenbach, also announced his campaign.

Canfield won the primaries with 46% of nearly 8,500 votes. Kamper joined him in continuing the general elections by achieving 32%. Reidenbach lost with 18%, and Beilby only won 4%. There were 44,000 eligible voters: 19% turnout.

A debate was held between Kamper and Canfield at Rochester Community College, though it was delayed until after the O. J. Simpson verdict announcement. At the debate, Kamper said Rochester did need a youth nightclub or youth center, but that it shouldn't be paid for with city money. Canfield responded by saying that jobs were more important than nightclubs.

Both candidates reporting spending thousands of dollars each on their campaigns. Canfield spent almost $10,000, while Kamper spent over $7,500.

With general election voter turnout at only 29% on November 7, Canfield beat Kamper with a "significant margin" ending the 16-year Hazama Administration. Canfield's mayoral victory left his councilman seat open, so according to the city charter the city council could appoint a replacement. Canfield left no comment on who that person ought to be. He died on January 24, 2017, at the age of 84.

== See also ==
- List of mayors of Rochester, Minnesota

Political offices
| Preceded by Chuck Hazama | Mayor of Rochester, Minnesota; 1995–2003 | Succeeded by Ardell Brede |
