= Kim Norton =

American politician (born 1957)

- Norton in 2021

47th Mayor of Rochester
- Incumbent
- Assumed office January 1, 2019
- Preceded by: Ardell Brede

Member of the Minnesota House of Representatives
- In office January 3, 2007 – January 2, 2017
- Preceded by: Fran Bradley
- Succeeded by: Duane Sauke
- Constituency: District 25B (2013–2017); District 29B (2007–2013)

Personal details
- Born: September 22, 1957 (age 69) Miami Beach, Florida
- Party: Democratic (DFL)
- Children: 4
- Education: University of Nebraska–Lincoln (BS); University of Minnesota (MA)

Kim Norton (born September 22, 1957) is an American politician serving as the mayor of Rochester, Minnesota. A member of the Democratic Party, she previously represented District 25B, which consists mostly of the northern portion of the city of Rochester, in the Minnesota House of Representatives. She was elected to become the first female mayor of Rochester in 2018 and reelected in 2022.

== Early life, education, and career ==
Norton was born in Miami Beach, Florida at a military base. She earned a B.S. in Human Development and Special Education, specializing in Early Childhood Education, from the University of Nebraska–Lincoln. She also attended graduate school there, studying Deaf Education, Behavioral Impairments and Curriculum.

Norton served on several committees in the Minnesota Department of Children, Families and Learning from 1998 to 2003 and, upon returning to Rochester, served on the Rochester School Board (as clerk in 2001, chair in 2005, and treasurer in 2006) prior to being elected to the House.

== Political career ==
Norton being interviewed for All Things Considered

Norton first ran against incumbent Rep. Fran Bradley in 2004, an election she lost by 311 votes. She ran again in 2006, defeating Republican challenger Rich Decker by just 99 votes. In 2008, she easily won re-election against Republican challenger Jason Johnson. In 2010, she was re-elected over Republican challenger Mike Rolih.

Norton stated in September 2015 that she would not seek re-election in the 2016 election saying "I've made the decision, after a couple of years of consideration, that it's time for me to retire, so I am not going to run for re-election in 2016. It makes me a little sad, I will say, but at the same time it feels like the right thing to do and the right time to do it."

Norton said that following her announcement not to run for reelection to the Minnesota House of Representatives that she was "fed-up" with partisan politics, and since leaving the House, she has worked to stay out of party politics. During her tenure as a state representative, she was widely viewed as a moderate, with a history of going against the DFL on some issues.

== Election history ==
2022 Rochester Mayoral Election
| Party | Candidate | Votes | % | ±% |
|---|---|---|---|---|
| Nonpartisan | Kim Norton | 26809 | 58.01 | |
| Nonpartisan | Britt Noser | 19315 | 41.79 | − |
| N/A | Write-In | 93 | 0.20 | − |

2018 Rochester Mayoral Election
| Party | Candidate | Votes | % | ±% |
|---|---|---|---|---|
| Nonpartisan | Kim Norton | 31810 | 67.73 | |
| Nonpartisan | Charlie O'Connell | 14968 | 31.80 | − |
| N/A | Write-In | 220 | 0.47 | − |

2014 Minnesota State Representative- House 25B
| Party | Candidate | Votes | % | ±% |
|---|---|---|---|---|
| Democratic (DFL) | Kim Norton (Incumbent) | 9844 | 94.91 | |
| N/A | Write-In | 528 | 5.09 | |

2012 Minnesota State Representative- House 25B
| Party | Candidate | Votes | % | ±% |
|---|---|---|---|---|
| Democratic (DFL) | Kim Norton (Incumbent) | 11869 | 57.53 | |
| Republican | Melissa Valeriano | 8725 | 42.29 | − |

2010 Minnesota State Representative- House 29B
| Party | Candidate | Votes | % | ±% |
|---|---|---|---|---|
| Democratic (DFL) | Kim Norton (Incumbent) | 7820 | 53.34 | |
| Republican | Mike Rolih | 6829 | 46.58 | − |

2008 Minnesota State Representative- House 29B
| Party | Candidate | Votes | % | ±% |
|---|---|---|---|---|
| Democratic (DFL) | Kim Norton | 12142 | 61.50 | +11.27 |
| Republican | Jason Johnson | 7553 | 38.26 | − |

2006 Minnesota State Representative- House 29B
| Party | Candidate | Votes | % | ±% |
|---|---|---|---|---|
| Democratic (DFL) | Kim Norton | 7761 | 50.23 | +1.10 |
| Republican | Rich Decker | 7662 | 49.59 | − |

2004 Minnesota State Representative- House 29B
| Party | Candidate | Votes | % | ±% |
|---|---|---|---|---|
| Democratic (DFL) | Kim Norton | 9353 | 49.13 | − |
| Republican | Fran Bradley | 9664 | 50.77 | −16.87 |

== Personal life ==
Norton has four children.

== See also ==
- List of mayors of Rochester, Minnesota

Political offices
| Preceded by Ardell Brede | Mayor of Rochester, Minnesota; 2019–present | Incumbent |
