= Sydney Anderson =

American politician (1881–1948)

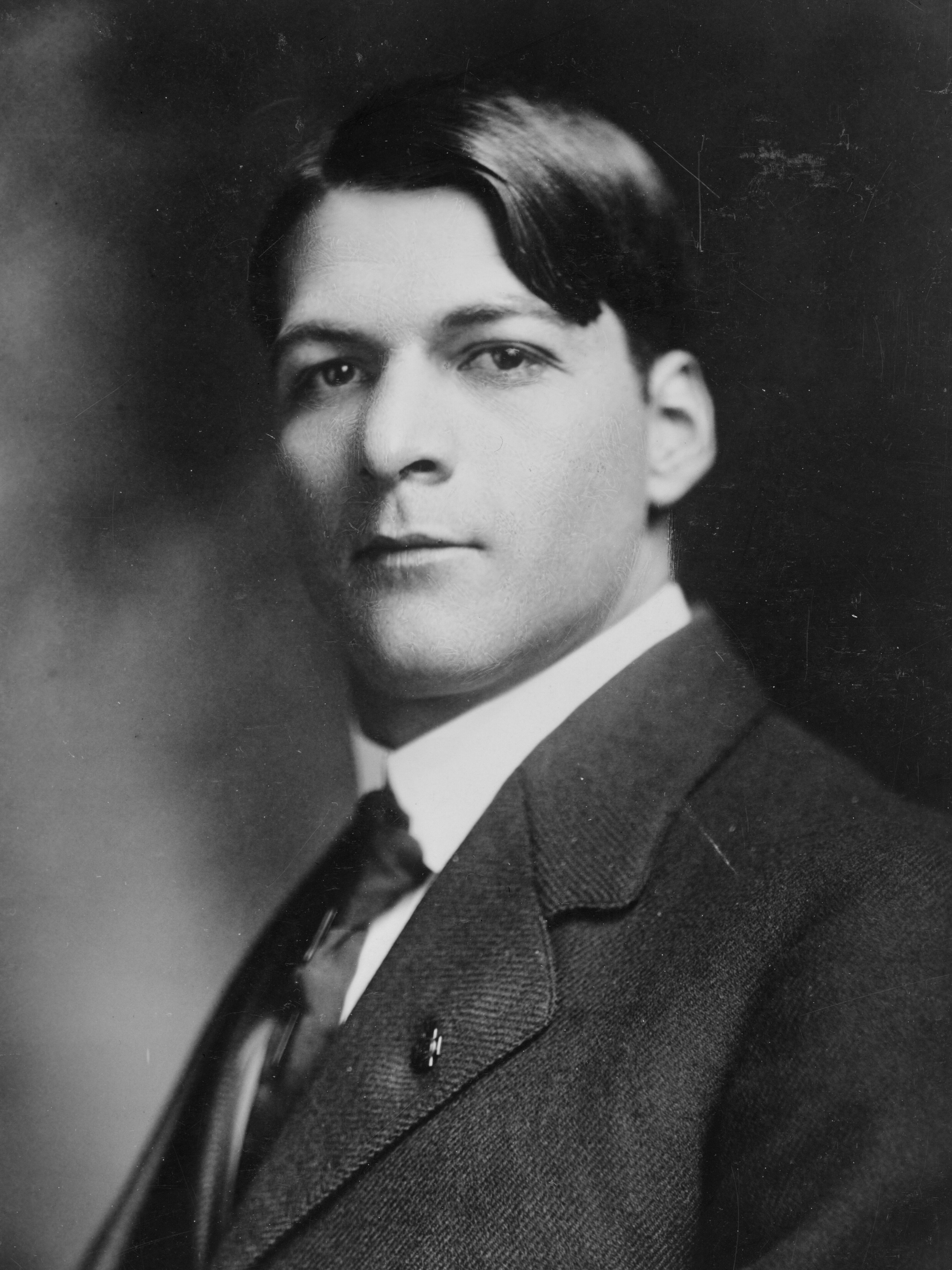
- Anderson in 1911

Member of the U.S. House of Representatives from Minnesota's 1st district
- In office March 4, 1911 – March 3, 1925
- Preceded by: James Albertus Tawney
- Succeeded by: Allen J. Furlow

Personal details
- Born: September 18, 1881 Zumbrota, Minnesota, U.S.
- Died: October 8, 1948 (aged 67) Minneapolis, Minnesota, U.S.
- Resting place: Lakewood Cemetery
- Party: Republican
- Education: Highland Park College; University of Minnesota at Minneapolis

Sydney Anderson (September 18, 1881 – October 8, 1948) was a representative from Minnesota; born in Zumbrota, Minnesota.

After attending primary schools he served as a private in Company D, Fourteenth Regiment, Minnesota Volunteer Infantry, during the Spanish–American War in 1898. He graduated from high school in 1899 and attended Highland Park College, Des Moines, Iowa, afterwards the University of Minnesota at Minneapolis. He studied law and moved to Kansas City, Missouri, later to Lanesboro, Minnesota, continuing his law practice from 1904 to 1911. He studied law and moved to Kansas City, Missouri, and later to Lanesboro, Minnesota, continuing his law practice from 1904 to 1911.{{Citation

In 1910 at the age of 29, he defeated incumbent James Albertus Tawney in the Republican primary election with the support of Theodore Roosevelt, Gifford Pinchot and other Progressive Republicans, running on a platform of drastically reduced tariffs and opposition to Cannonism. He was subsequently elected to the 62nd, 63rd, 64th, 65th, 66th, 67th, and 68th congresses, (March 4, 1911 – March 3, 1925).

Anderson chaired the Congressional Joint Commission of Agricultural Inquiry in 1921 and 1922. He declined to be a candidate for reelection in 1924 to the 69th congress. Anderson later became vice chairman of the research council of the National Transportation Institute at Washington, D.C., in 1923 and 1924; president of the Millers' National Federation, Chicago, IL, and Washington, D.C., 1924–1929; llVice-llPresident, secretary, and, later, member of the board of directors of General Mills, Inc., Minneapolis, 1930–1948; and, finally, president of the Transportation Association of America, Chicago, 1943–1948.

Anderson died in Minneapolis on October 8, 1948, at the age of 67, and was buried in Lakewood Cemetery, in Minneapolis.

U.S. House of Representatives
Preceded by James Albertus Tawney	U.S. Representative from Minnesota's 1st congressional district 1911–1925	Succeeded by Allen J. Furlow
