= Marpiya te najin =

Dakota warrior executed in 1862

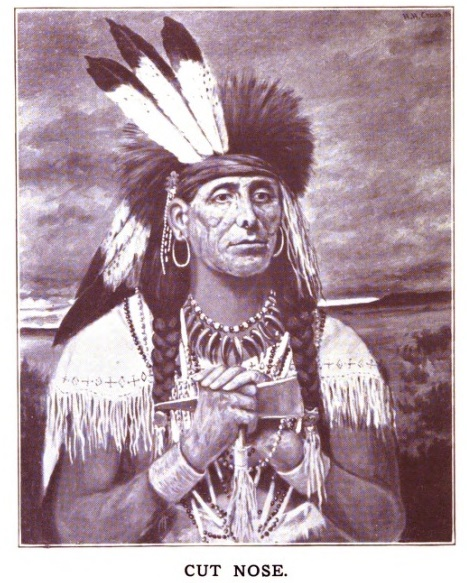
- 1 January 1909, Walker, T. B. and the Press of Hahn & Harmon Co.; courtesy of HathiTrust. From a descriptive catalogue with reproductions of life-size bust portraits. Originally exhibited in the Minnesota pioneers' portrait galleries on the State Fairgrounds in 1909.
- Born: unknown
- Died: 26 December 1862; Mankato, Minnesota, United States
- Cause of death: Execution by hanging
- Other names: Marpiya Okinajin, He-who-lives-in-the-Clouds, Cut-Nose

Marpiya te najin, or Marpiya Okinajin, literally "He-who-stands-in-the-Clouds", was a Dakota warrior noted for being one of the "38+2" Dakota warriors executed in Mankato, Minnesota by the order of U.S. Army Colonel Henry Hastings Sibley for their resistance of U.S. Military incursions upon Dakota land in the Dakota War of 1862, one of the American Indian Wars carried out in the American pursuit of the political-cultural philosophy Manifest Destiny. Marpiya te najin has also historically been known improperly by the mistranslated name Cut-Nose, which is considered inappropriate by many members of the Dakota people.

== Abuse of human remains by the Mayo Clinic ==
After his execution and burial in a shallow grave, his body was exhumed by the English-born physician Dr. William Worrall Mayo, who then dismembered and dissected the body as an educational specimen. His sons Charles Horace Mayo and William James Mayo, who at the time were an infant and unborn, respectively, would go on to develop medical textbooks, relying on information gathered through the dissection, and founded the Mayo Clinic.

== Contemporary reconciliatory efforts by the Mayo Clinic ==
Seeking to account for Marpiya te najin's nonconsensual, yet critical role in the founding of the Mayo Clinic, the administration of the contemporary Mayo Clinic has, through pressure from Indigenous rights advocacy organizations, sought to accept the unethicality of the misuse of his remains. This has included, most prominently, the creation of a scholarship fund for Dakota citizens known as the "Marpiya te najin Scholarship".
