= Victor Christgau =

American politician

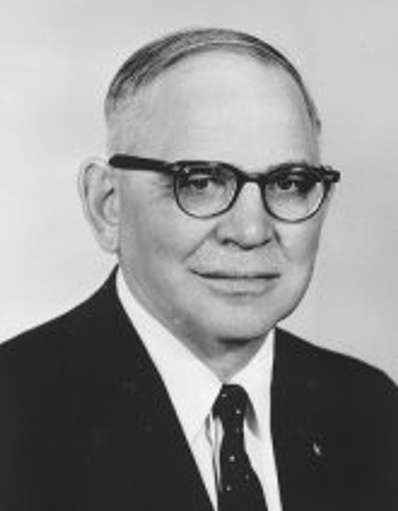
- U.S. Social Security Administration photo, c. 1961

Member of the U.S. House of Representatives from Minnesota's 1st district
- In office March 4, 1929 – March 3, 1933
- Preceded by: Allen J. Furlow
- Succeeded by: Multi-member district

Member of the Minnesota Senate from the 5th district
- In office January 3, 1927 – March 4, 1929
- Preceded by: Fremont Jackson Thoe
- Succeeded by: A. O. Starks

Personal details
- Born: Victor Laurence August Christgau; September 20, 1894 Dexter Township, Mower County, Minnesota, U.S.
- Died: October 10, 1991 (aged 97) Washington, D. C., U.S.
- Party: Republican
- Education: University of Minnesota

Victor Laurence August Christgau (September 20, 1894 – October 10, 1991) was a politician and government official from Minnesota.

== Early life ==
Christgau was born in Dexter Township, Mower County, near Austin, Minnesota. His mother and paternal grandparents were German immigrants. He graduated from the school of agriculture of the University of Minnesota at St. Paul in 1917 and from its college of agriculture in 1923. He engaged in agricultural pursuits. During the First World War he served overseas in the United States Army as a sergeant in the Thirty-third Regiment of Engineers.

== Career ==
He was a member of the Minnesota Senate from 1927 until his resignation in 1929. He was elected as a Republican to the 71st and 72nd US Congresses, (March 4, 1929 – March 3, 1933) and was an unsuccessful candidate for renomination in 1932.

He resumed agricultural pursuits and was appointed executive assistant to the director of production, Division of Agricultural Adjustment Administration, in June 1933. He was director of the Production Division and assistant administrator from January 1934 through February 1935. He was appointed state administrator of the Minnesota Works Progress Administration in June 1935 and served until June 1938.

From 1939 through 1954 Christgau was state director of the Minnesota division of employment and security at St. Paul. He then served as president of the Interstate Conference Employment Security Agencies from 1947 to 1948; Director, Bureau of Old Age and Survivors Insurance, Social Security Administration, from 1954 to 1963, and executive director of Social Security Administration from January, 1963 to March, 1967.

He was a resident of Washington, D.C. until his death there on October 10, 1991.

U.S. House of Representatives
| Preceded by Allen J. Furlow | Member of the U.S. House of Representatives from Minnesota's 1st congressional district March 4, 1929 – March 3, 1933 | Succeeded by District eliminated |
Honorary titles
| Preceded by Hamilton Fish III | Most senior living U.S. representative (Sitting or former); January 18, 1991 – October 10, 1991 | Succeeded by Jennings Randolph; Robert T. Secrest |
