= William Worrall Mayo =

British-American medical doctor and chemist (1819–1911)

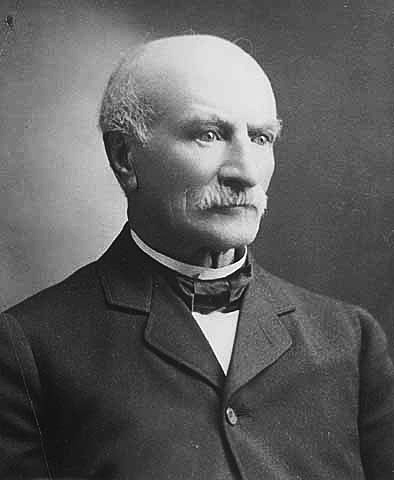
- Born: May 31, 1819; Salford, Lancashire, England
- Died: March 6, 1911 (aged 91); Rochester, Minnesota, U.S.
- Resting place: Oakwood Cemetery, Rochester, Minnesota, U.S.
- Education: University of Missouri
- Occupations: Doctor; chemist
- Known for: Establishing the Mayo Clinic
- Spouse: Louise Abigail Wright (m. 1851)
- Children: 5, including Charles Horace Mayo and William James Mayo

Member of the Minnesota State Senate
- In office 1891–1895

17th Mayor of Rochester, Minnesota
- In office 1882–1883
- Preceded by: Samuel Whitten
- Succeeded by: Orson Sage Porter

William Worrall Mayo (May 31, 1819 – March 6, 1911) was an English American medical doctor and chemist. He is best known for establishing the private medical practice that later evolved into the Mayo Clinic. His sons, William James Mayo and Charles Horace Mayo, established a joint medical practice in Rochester in the U.S. state of Minnesota in the 1880s.

== Early life ==
William Worrall Mayo was born May 31, 1819, in Salford, Lancashire, England, which was then situated in the ecclesiastical parish of Eccles, where he was baptized on October 24, 1819. He studied science in Manchester under John Dalton, the chemist and physicist responsible for formulating the modern atomic theory of matter and devising a table of relative atomic weights. In 1846, Mayo left for the United States. His first work in his new country was as a pharmacist at Bellevue Hospital in New York City, though he soon moved westward.

Mayo spent a brief period of time in Buffalo, New York, before settling in Lafayette, Indiana, where he worked as a tailor (one of the vocations he had while in England). He returned to medicine in 1849, assisting in a cholera outbreak and then attending courses at Indiana Medical College in La Porte, Indiana. Although the training there would probably be considered mediocre by modern standards, the school did have a microscope, an uncommon tool at the time. Knowledge of how to use this instrument proved to be useful in Mayo's future practice. It is a matter of debate whether Mayo actually graduated from the Indiana Medical College. William Mayo reportedly stated orally that he graduated from the Indiana Medical College. His graduation date from the Indiana Medical College has been reported as February 14, 1850. However, no documentation of his graduation exists and he is not listed in the Indiana Medical School list of graduates for that year. He then attended and graduated from the University of Missouri on February 28, 1854, with a degree in medicine.

== Migrating west ==
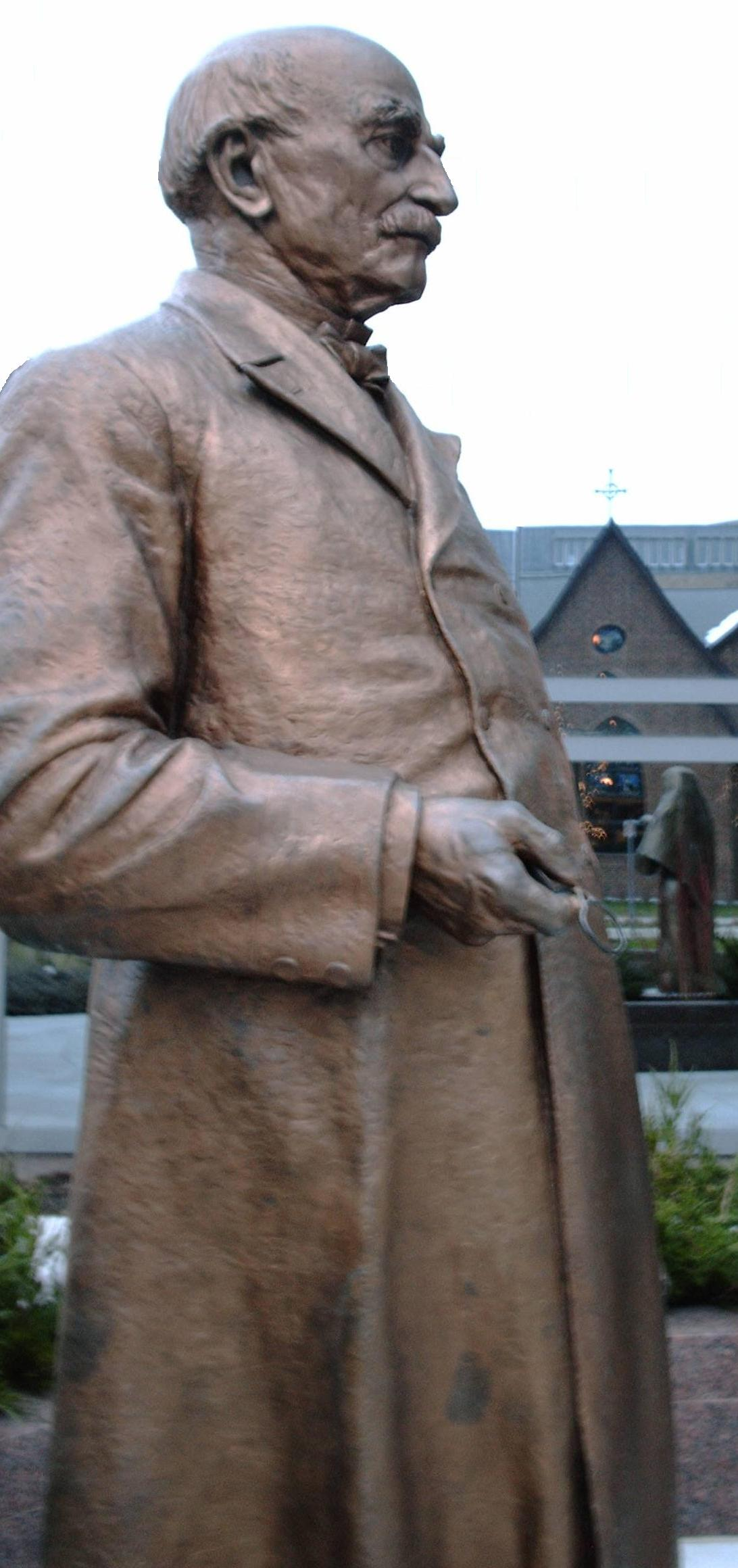
Statue of Mayo near the Mayo Clinic in Rochester, Minnesota

In 1851, Mayo married Louise Abigail Wright (December 23, 1825 – July 15, 1915), and two years later, they had their first child, Gertrude. Around this time, Mayo left for a winter to work as an assistant at the University of Missouri's medical department. He returned in 1854, but contracted malaria and decided to leave the Lafayette area, saying, "I'm going to keep on driving until I get well or die." Mayo found his way to Minnesota, which he thought would have a more healthful climate and where he did recover from malaria. He settled in Saint Paul, but returned to Indiana a short time later to bring his family to the Minnesota territory. Mayo then found his way to the present-day area of Duluth where he worked as a census-taker.

He brought his family to a village named Cronan's Precinct (near Le Sueur) along the Minnesota River where he became known as the "Little Doctor" because of his 5-foot-4-inch (1.63 m) stature. Mayo tried his hand at a number of different activities including farming, operating a ferry service, and serving as a justice of the peace in addition to occasional medical duties. By this time, he had two more daughters in his family, Phoebe and Sarah.

After a flood in 1859, the family moved to a home on Main Street in Le Sueur, now known as the Dr. William W. Mayo House. There, he set up his first official medical practice, but the flow of patients was too meager to support the family. Mayo took to publishing a short-lived newspaper, the Le Sueur Courier, which only lasted about three months. He also spent time working on a steamboat. The family saw its first male addition, William James Mayo, in 1861.

As the American Civil War began that same year, Mayo attempted to procure a commission as a military surgeon but was rejected. Nonetheless, he found his way into military medicine as the Dakota War of 1862 erupted in southwest Minnesota in late 1862. Organizing a group of people from Le Sueur and St. Peter, Mayo headed out to New Ulm, where some of the worst fighting had occurred. Makeshift hospitals in the city cared for people injured in the conflict, as well as refugees driven from farms in the area. His wife opened her home and a nearby barn to harbor eleven refugee families back in Le Sueur. In hopes of getting a body for dissection, Mayo, among other medical men, attended the hanging of 38 Native Americans in December 1862 for their role in the uprising. Many of the trials of Native Americans took less than 10 minutes. The execution of 38 Dakota men remains the "largest mass execution in American history." Mayo led a team of doctors who dug up the executed men and hauled them away for use as medical cadavers. Mayo was given the body of Marpiya te najin, also called Cut Nose, whom he dissected in front of medical colleagues.

== Rochester ==
On April 24, 1863, Mayo was named examining surgeon for the first Minnesota draft board headquartered in Rochester, Minnesota. He left his family for that position and soon found the new city to his liking, so they joined him there in early 1864. A year later, his son Charles Horace Mayo was born.

Mayo opened a solo medical practice in Rochester in 1863. He partnered with W. A. Hyde from February to June 1864 before going back to solo practice. In November 1867, Mayo entered into a partnership with pharmacist O. W. Anderson, which lasted until November 1869 when Mayo left heading for Pennsylvania and New York City to study surgical techniques. Mayo's first foray into politics was in 1872 when he made a speech to expose local corruption, which ended poorly and Mayo left for Saint Paul. In 1874, Mayo returned to Rochester to rebuild his practice and re-entered local politics. Mayo advocated for a municipal water supply and served on the local Health Board. In the 1880s, Mayo was elected to city mayor, alderman, and was later a member of the school board. As mayor, he oversaw the planning of the first City Hall. He served in the Minnesota State Senate from 1891 to 1895 and was a Democrat. By now, the number of patients was large enough to support the family with no need for him to assume additional jobs. In the 1890s, Mayo advocated unsuccessfully to create an artificial lake by damming Bear Creek where it enters the Zumbro River.

The event that is usually credited with beginning the "Mayo Clinic Story" happened on August 21, 1883, when a tornado devastated Rochester. The most seriously wounded were tended at the German Library in Rommel's Hall with David Berkman as steward. Since many of the patients would need intensive care beyond what was being provided by the patient's relatives and friends, Mayo recruited the local Sisters of Saint Francis of Rochester, Minnesota, to be nurses. William J. Mayo had just completed medical school, and Charles H. Mayo was in his final year of school, so both were able to assist their father with care of the tornado's victims. Mother Alfred Moes of the Sisters of St. Francis was convinced a full-fledged hospital was needed in Rochester and approached Mayo to head it. She offered to raise the funds and supervise the construction of the hospital. Under her direction, St. Marys Hospital was built and opened in September 1889. Originally, St. Marys Hospital had 12 beds, the three Mayo doctors as surgeons, and the Sisters of St. Francis as staff.

== Mayo Clinic ==
In 1892, Mayo asked Augustus Stinchfield to join his practice as a full partner. Once Stinchfield accepted the offer, Mayo retired at age 73. As the practice grew, Christopher Graham, E. Starr Judd, Henry Stanley Plummer, Melvin Millet, and Donald Balfour were also invited to join it as partners. In 1919, the partners of the private practice created the Mayo Properties Association and established the Mayo Foundation for Medical Education and Research as a not-for-profit entity.

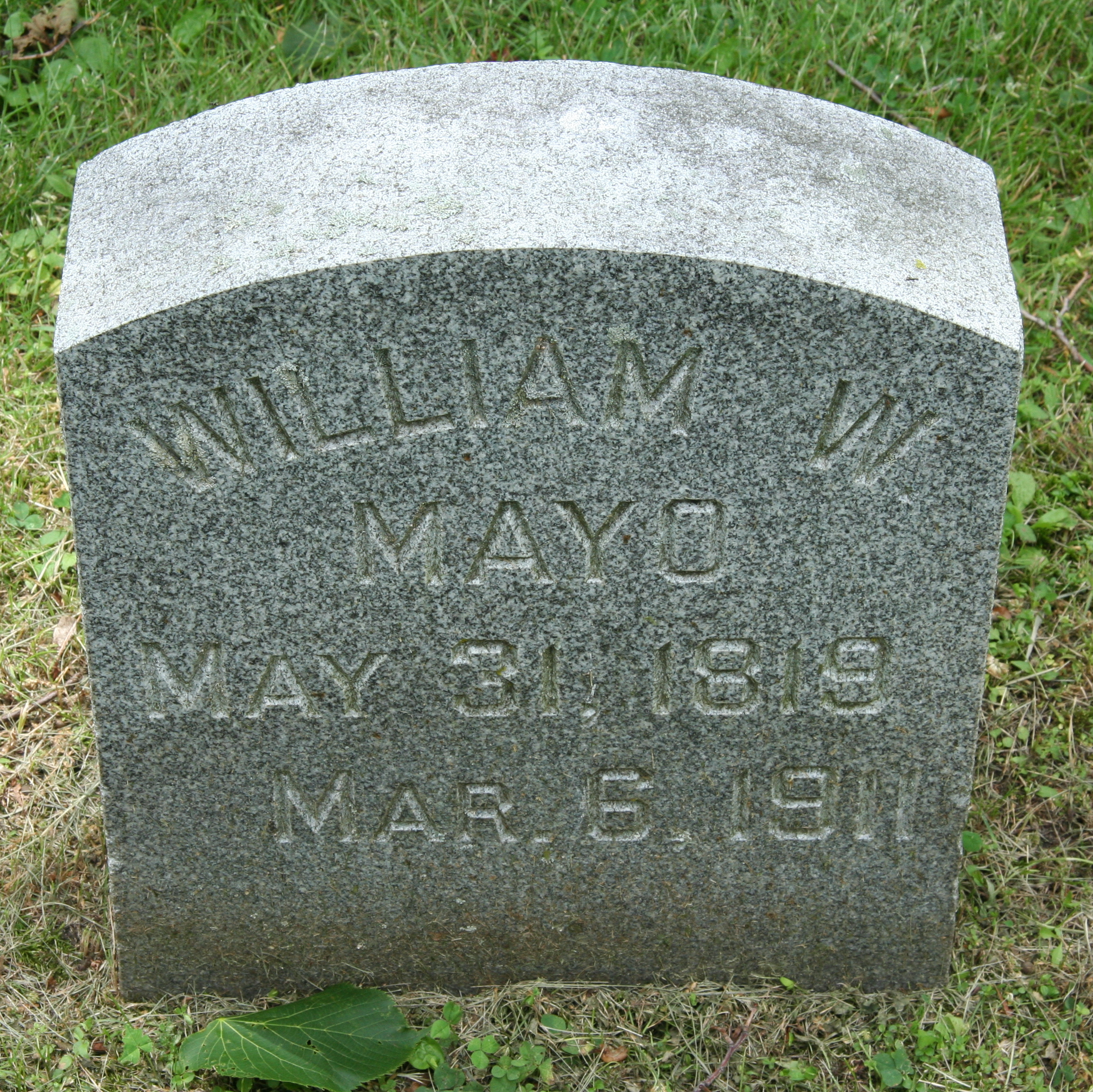
Gravestone of William Worrall Mayo

In 1910, Mayo became interested in the extraction and distillation of alcohol from animal and vegetable wastes, and one day suffered a serious injury when the extraction mechanism crushed his arm and hand. That injury necessitated an amputation. Complications resulted in his death in March 1911, shortly before Mayo's 92nd birthday. His wife died in 1915. They are buried next to each other at Oakwood Cemetery in Rochester.

The family's home in Le Sueur was added to the National Register of Historic Places in 1969. Carson Nesbit Cosgrove and his family later lived in the home. Cosgrove went on to help create the Minnesota Valley Canning Company, later named Green Giant. Mayo's home in Rochester was razed to build the original Mayo Clinic building in 1914.

== Sources ==
- "W.W. Mayo House: Where innovation took root". Minnesota Historical Society.
- Clapesattle, Helen. The Doctors Mayo, University of Minnesota Press (1975). ISBN 0-8166-0465-7
- Hartzell, Judith. "I Started All This: The Life of Dr. William Worrall Mayo", Arvi Books (2004). ISBN 0-9703569-1-9
- Mayo, Charles W. "Mayo: The Story of My Family and My Career," Doubleday and Company (1968)
- Eddy-Schultz, Fern. La Porte County Historian, La Porte, Indiana.
- Mayo Clinic website. http://history.mayoclinic.org/timelines/this-month-in-our-history.php

Preceded by Samuel Whitten	Mayor of Rochester, Minnesota; 1882 – 1883	Succeeded by Samuel Whitten
