= John Karl Daniels =

Norwegian-American sculptor (1875–1978)

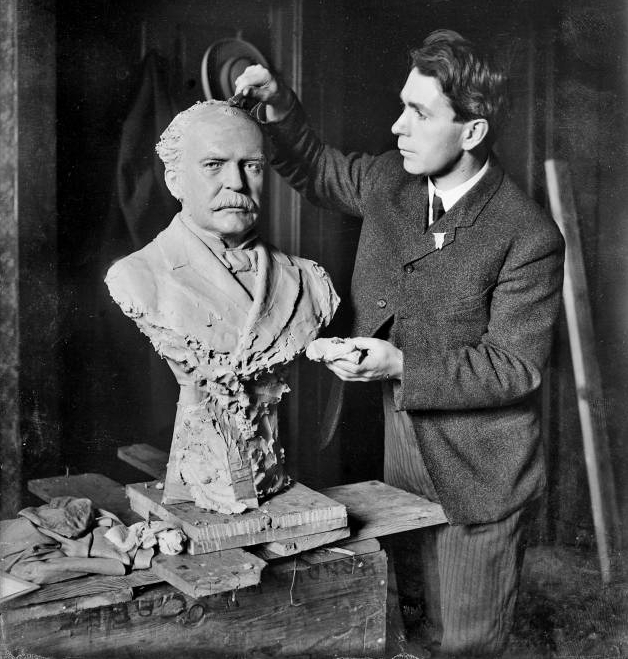
- Daniels in 1906 modeling a bust of Edward F. Dunne, mayor of Chicago
- Born: John Karl Daniels; May 14, 1875; Saltdal Municipality, Norway
- Died: March 8, 1978 (aged 102); Minneapolis, Minnesota, U.S.
- Resting place: Acacia Park Cemetery, Mendota Heights
- Education: Mechanics Arts High School

John Karl Daniels (May 14, 1875 – March 8, 1978) was a Norwegian-American sculptor.

== Early life and career ==
He was born in Norway, and immigrated with his family to the United States in 1884. He attended the Mechanics Arts High School in St. Paul, Minnesota, where he first received formal training for sculpting. He became a pupil of Knut Okerberg in Norway, and of Andrew O'Connor in Paris, France.

Daniels's studio was in a former icehouse located behind the George W. and Nancy B. Van Dusen House at 1900 LaSalle Avenue in Minneapolis.

He created war memorials for Grafton, North Dakota and Long Prairie, Minnesota. His granite Pioneers sculpture was given to the City of Minneapolis by the family of Charles Alfred Pillsbury during the Great Depression, serving as the centerpiece of the Pioneer Square Park. His work includes the Soldiers Monument at Summit Park in St. Paul, the architectural ornament of the Washburn Park Water Tower in Minneapolis, and the statue of Leif Erikson at Leif Erikson Park in Duluth, Minnesota.

His sculptures at the Minnesota State Capitol include the Knute Nelson Monument and Leif Erikson on the capitol grounds, and General John B. Sanborn and Colonel Alexander Wilkin in the rotunda. At the Veterans Service Building is Earthbound, a 1956 work dedicated to the military veterans of Minnesota, and sculpted when Daniels was 80 years old.

He died in Minneapolis in 1978.

== Gallery ==
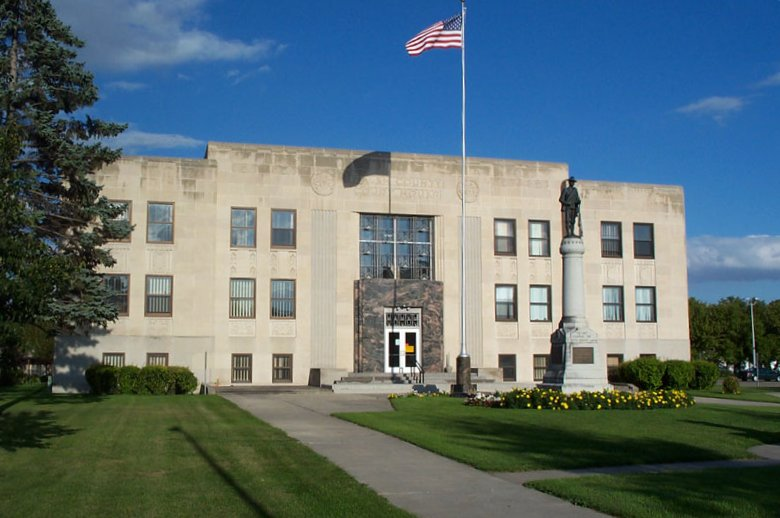
Spanish–American War Monument (1900), Walsh County Courthouse, Grafton, North Dakota.

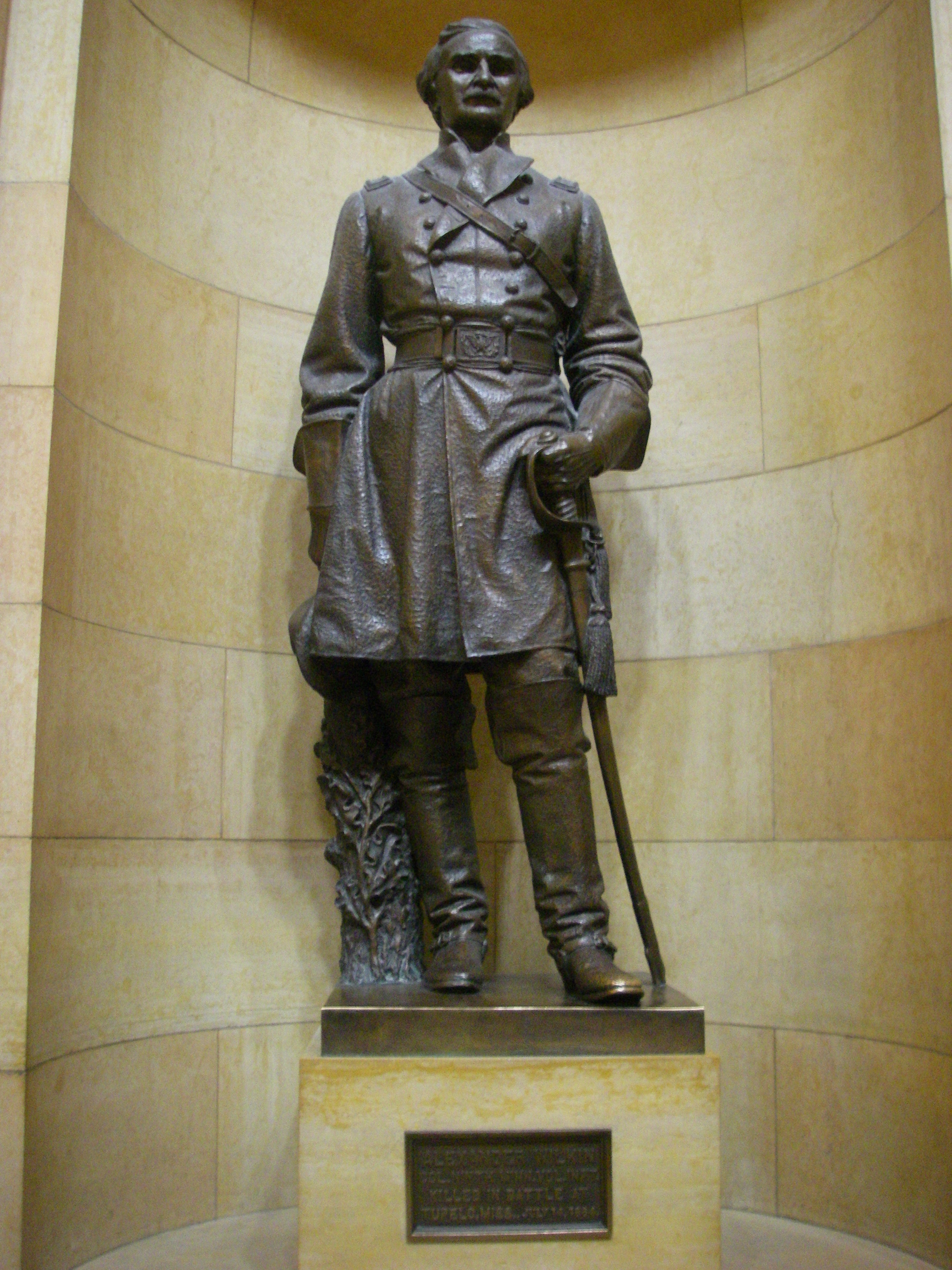
Colonel Alexander Wilkin (1910), Minnesota State Capitol, St. Paul, Minnesota.

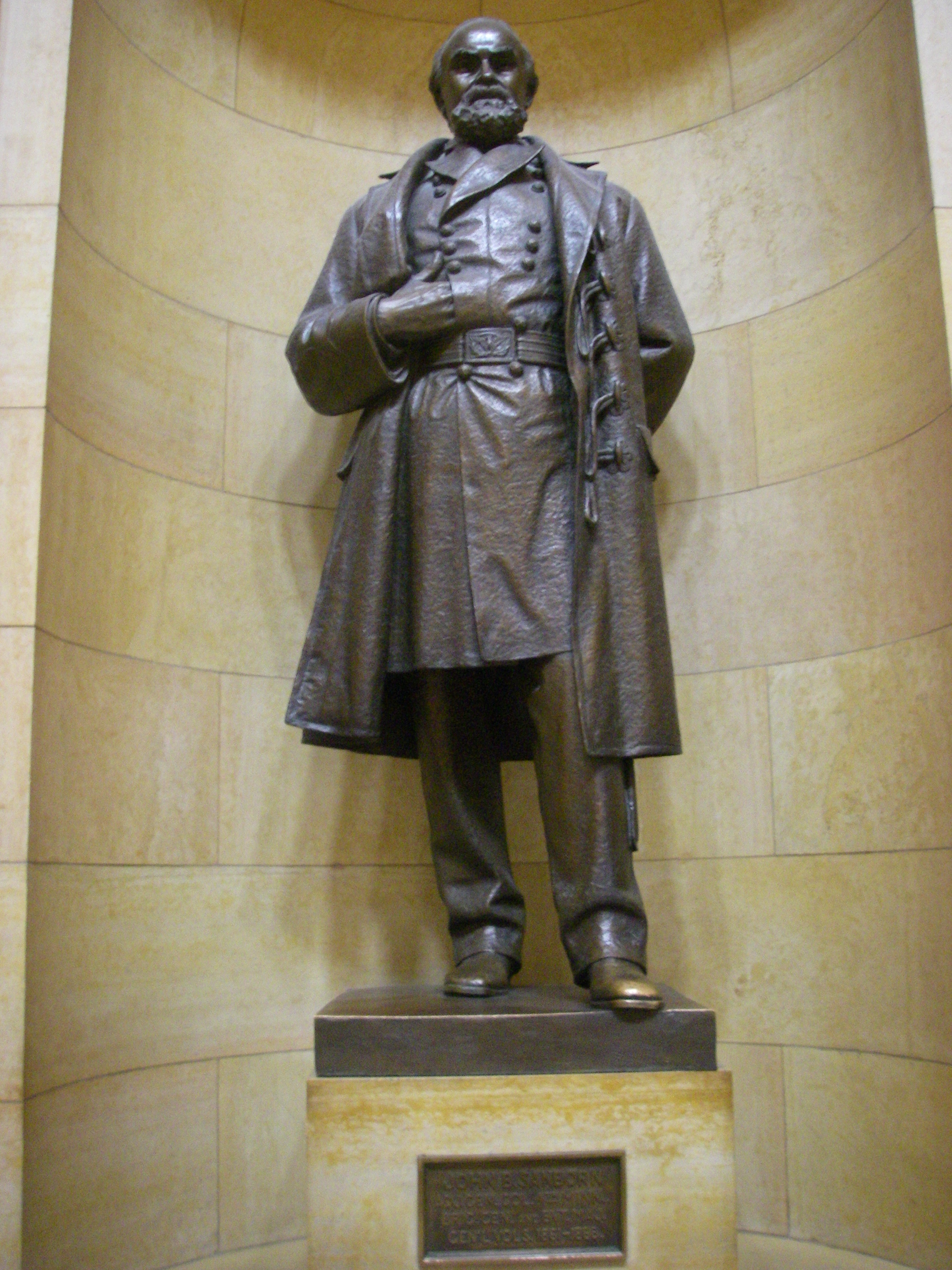
General John P. Sanborn (ca. 1910), Minnesota State Capitol, St. Paul, Minnesota.

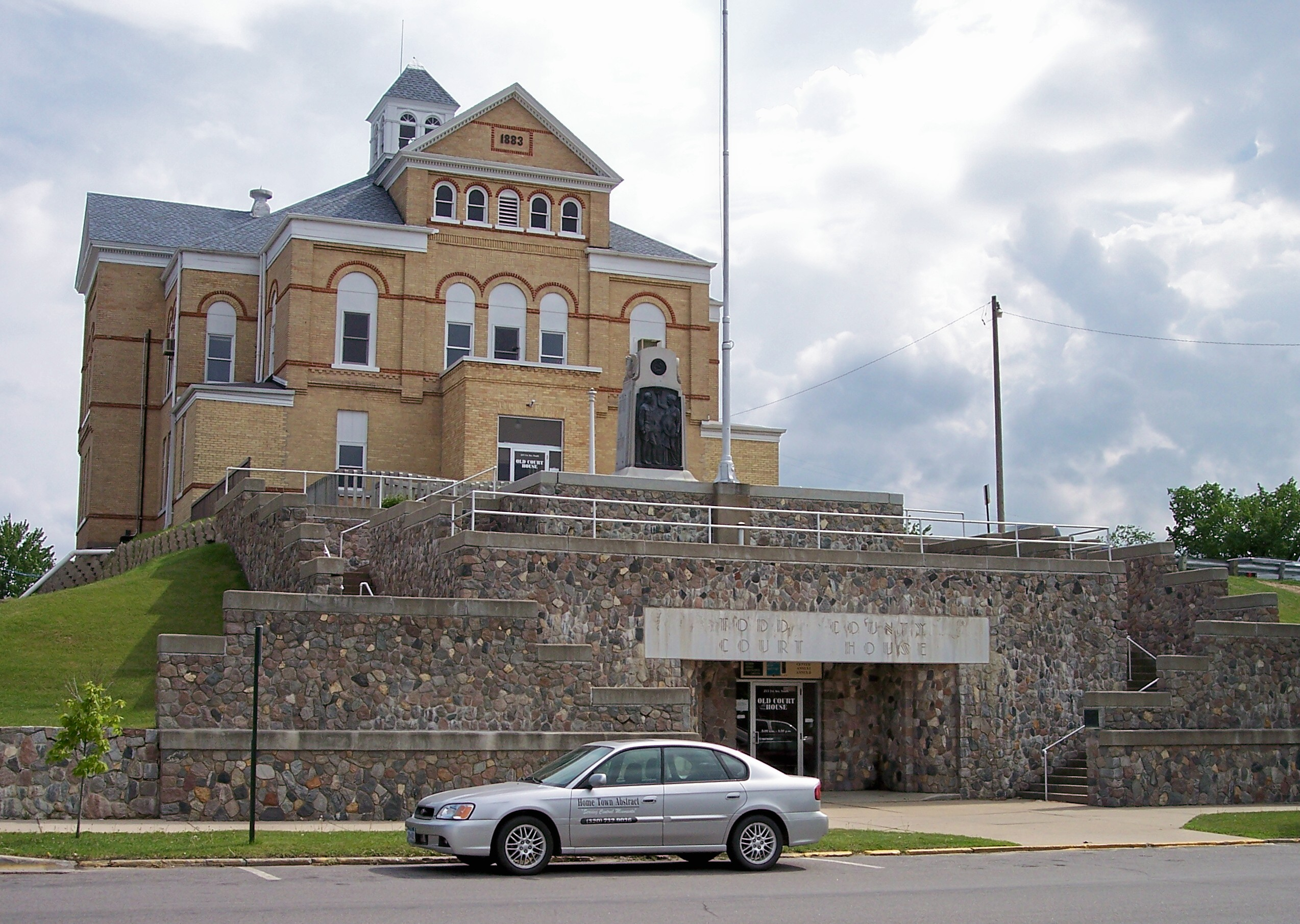
World War I Memorial (ca. 1920), Todd County Courthouse, Long Prairie, Minnesota.

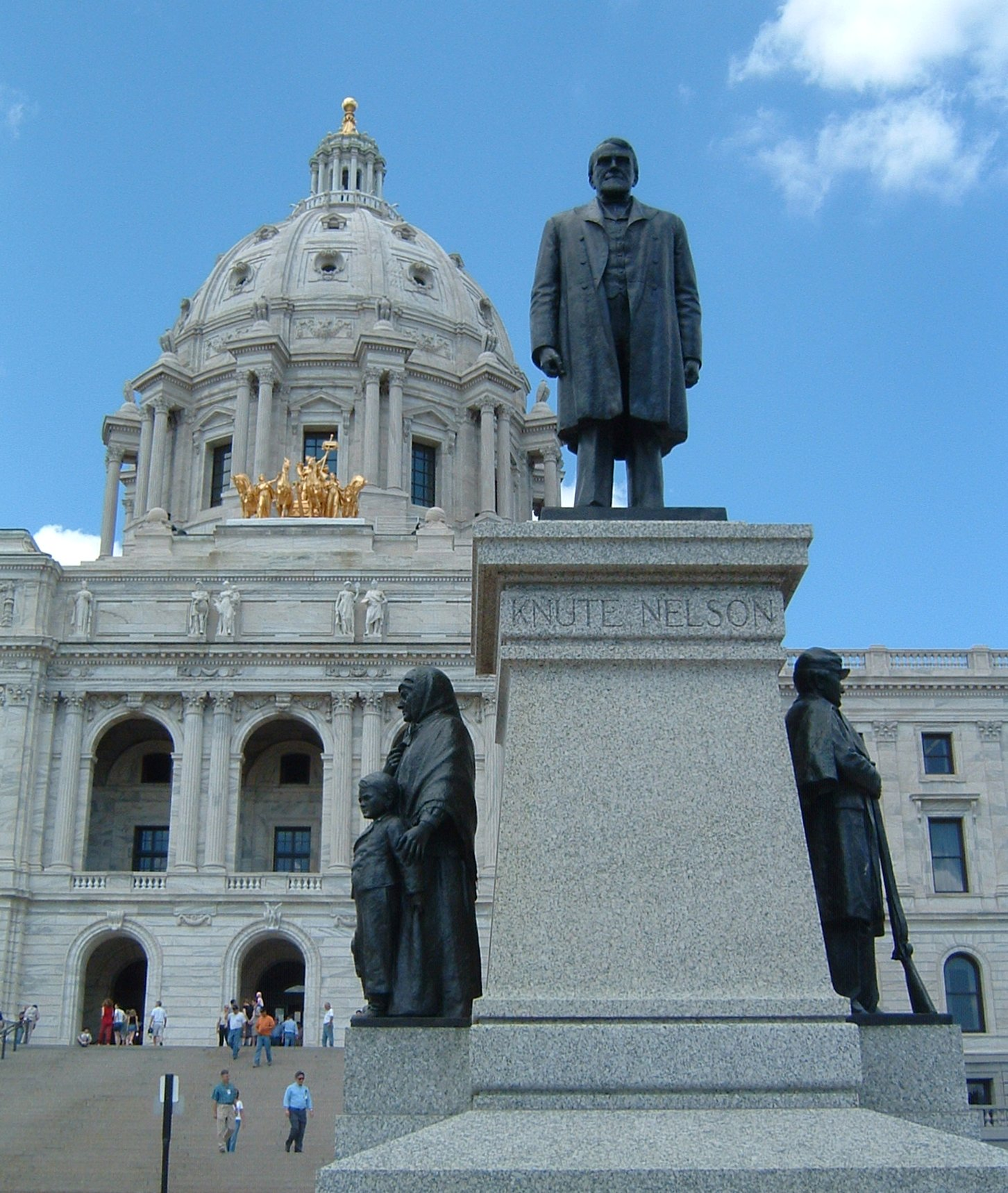
Knute Nelson Monument (1928), Minnesota State Capitol, St. Paul, Minnesota.

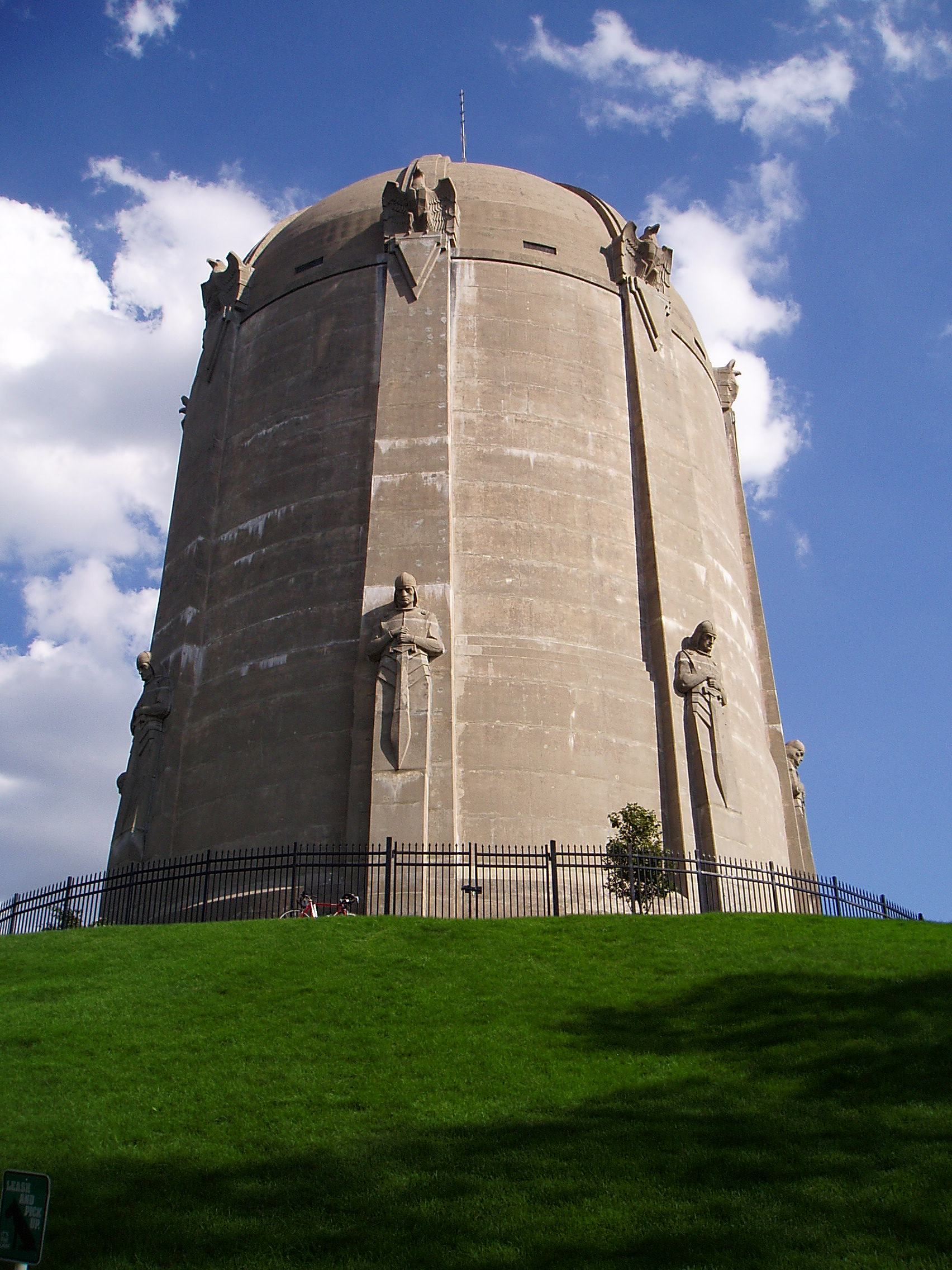
Washburn Park Water Tower (1932), Minneapolis, Minnesota.

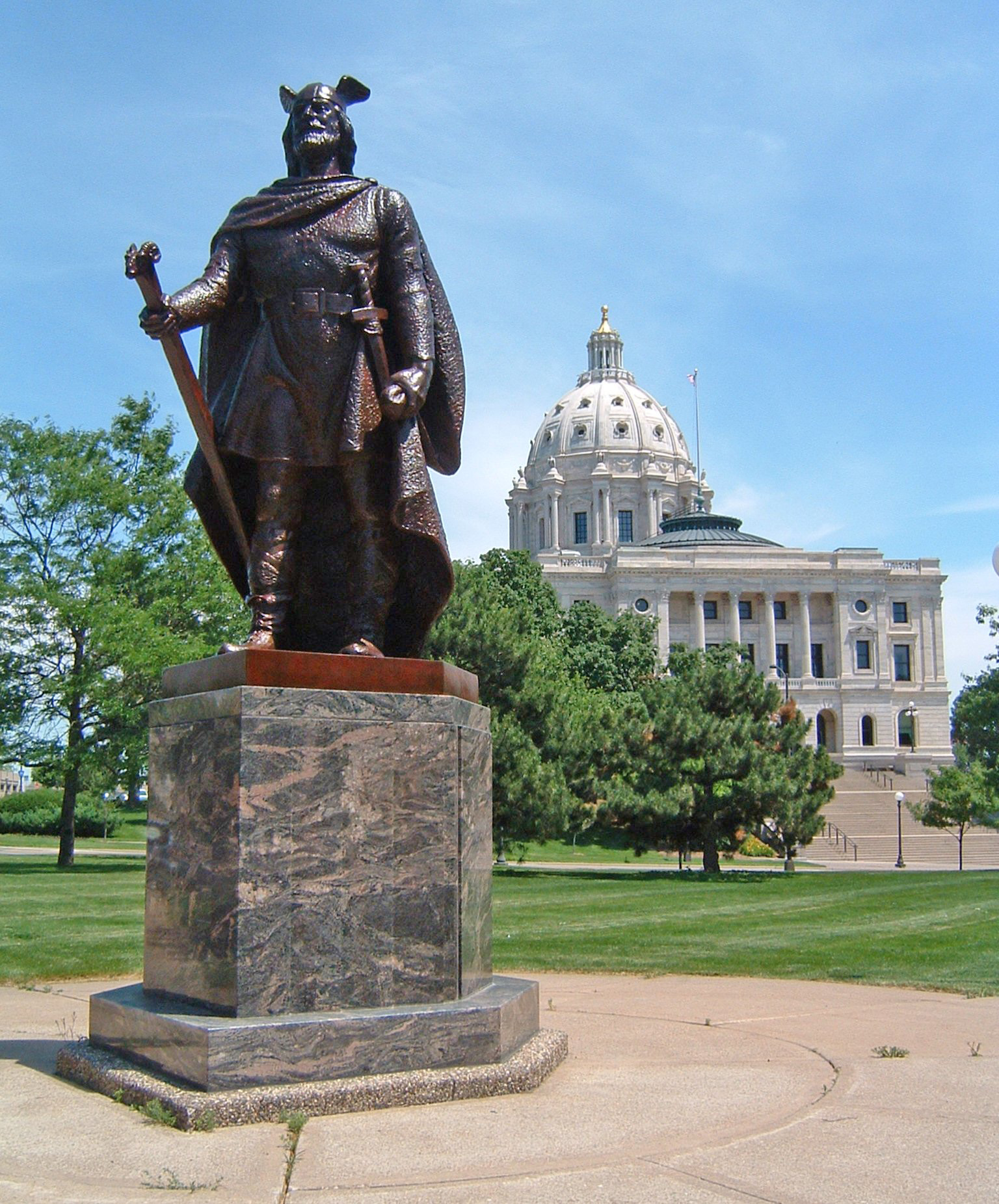
Leif Erikson (1948–49), Minnesota State Capitol, St. Paul, Minnesota.

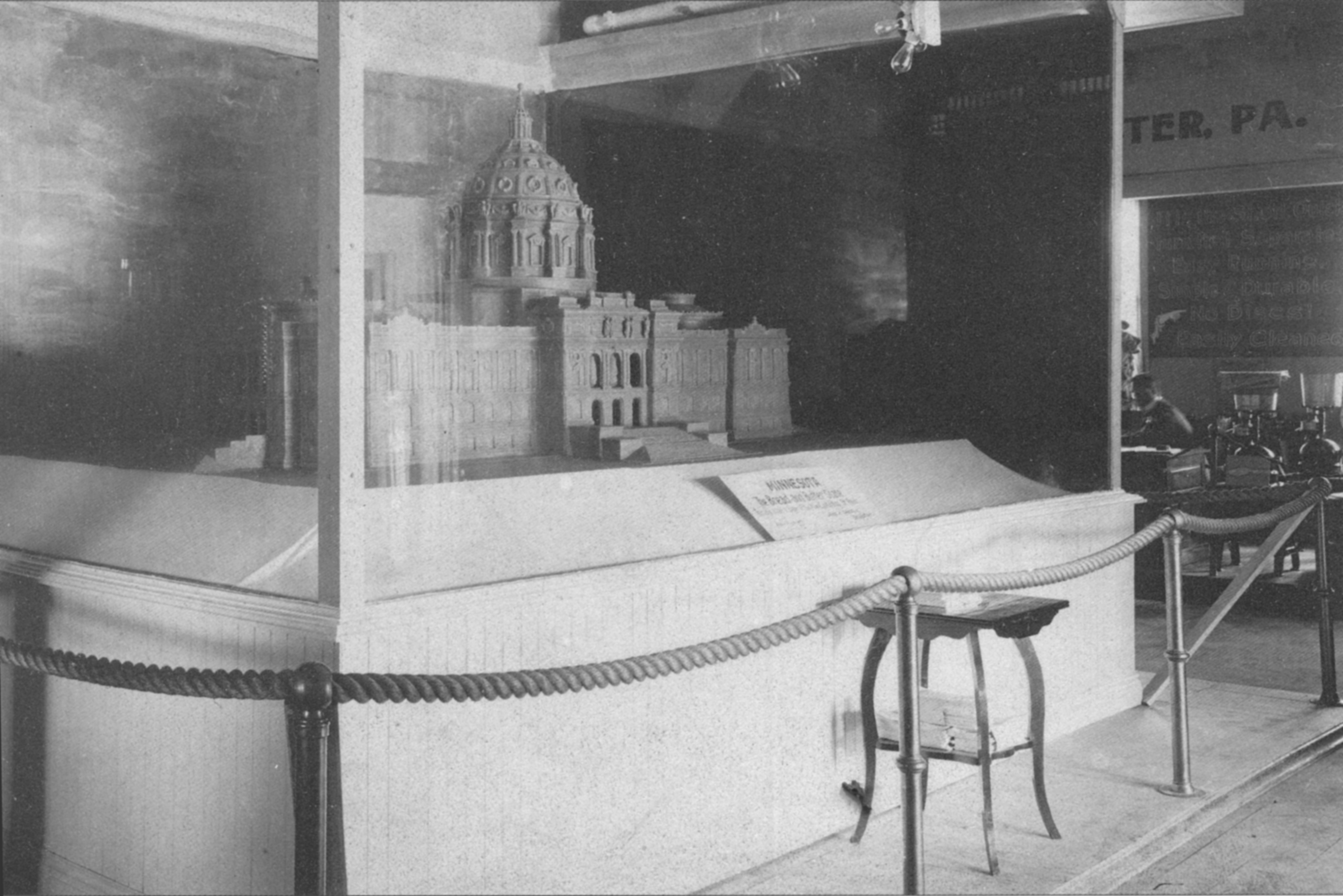
Minnesota's State Capitol sculpted in butter for the 1901 Pan-American Exposition.

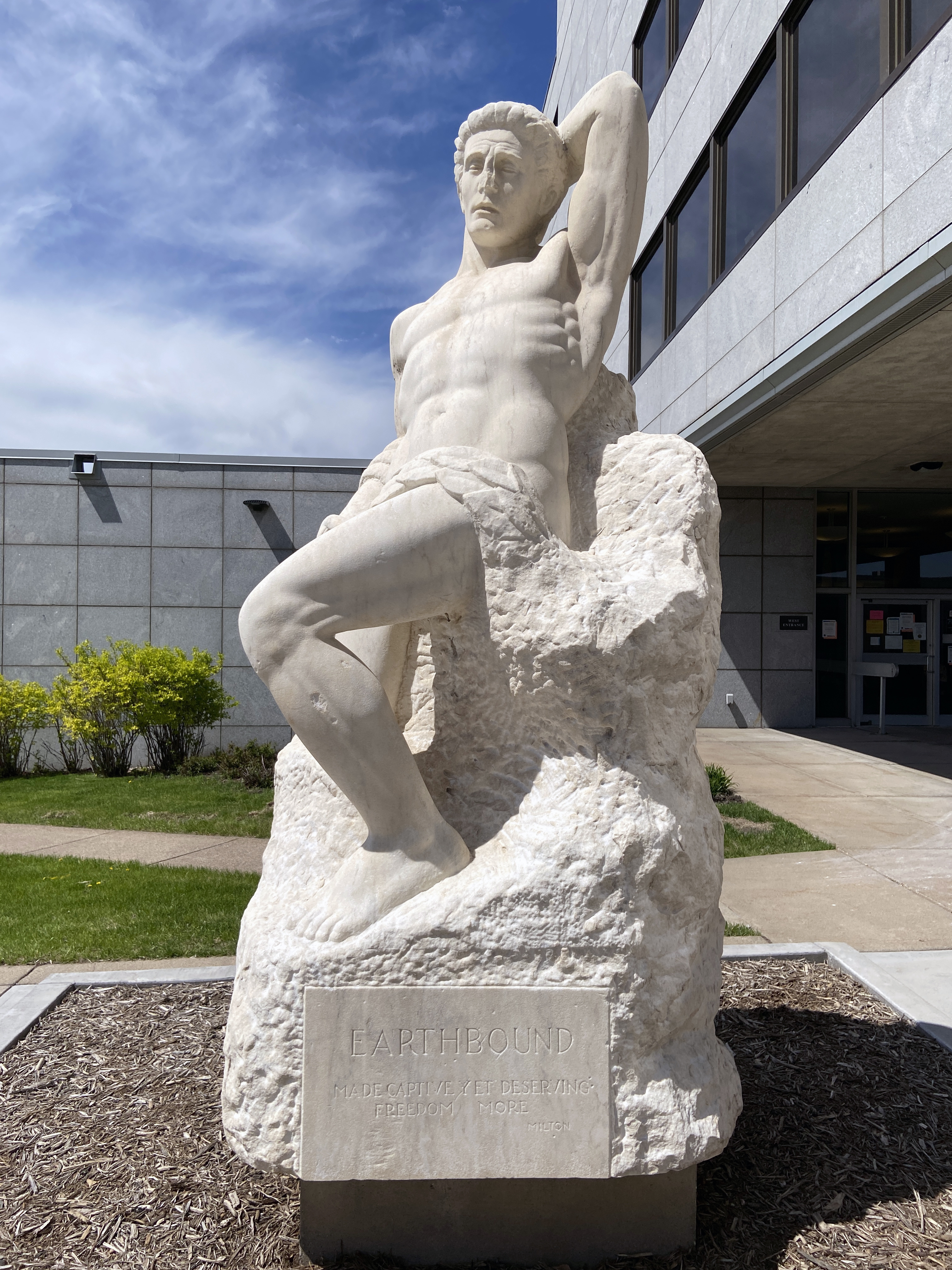
Earthbound Monument: Made Captive but Deserving Freedom More, Minnesota State Capitol, St. Paul, Minnesota.

Soldiers' and Sailors' Monument (1903), St. Paul, Minnesota
