= Ardell Brede =

American politician

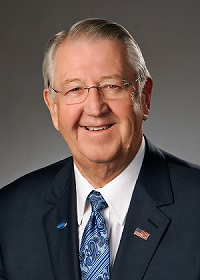
- Mayor Ardell Brede

46th Mayor of Rochester, Minnesota
- In office January 6, 2003 – January 1, 2019
- Preceded by: Chuck Canfield
- Succeeded by: Kim Norton

Personal details
- Born: June 23, 1939 (age 87) Austin, Minnesota, U.S.
- Party: Democratic (DFL) (Note: Mayors’s office is officially nonpartisan)
- Spouse: Judy Brede (m. 1961; died 2018)
- Children: 3
- Education: Austin Junior College

Ardell F. Brede (born June 23, 1939) is an American politician who served as mayor of Rochester, Minnesota. Born in Austin, Minnesota, Brede was the mayor of Rochester from January 6, 2003, until January 1, 2019. He was preceded by Chuck Canfield. On November 6, 2018, Kim Norton was elected as his successor. Before he was elected, he worked as an administrator for the Mayo Clinic.

== Biography ==
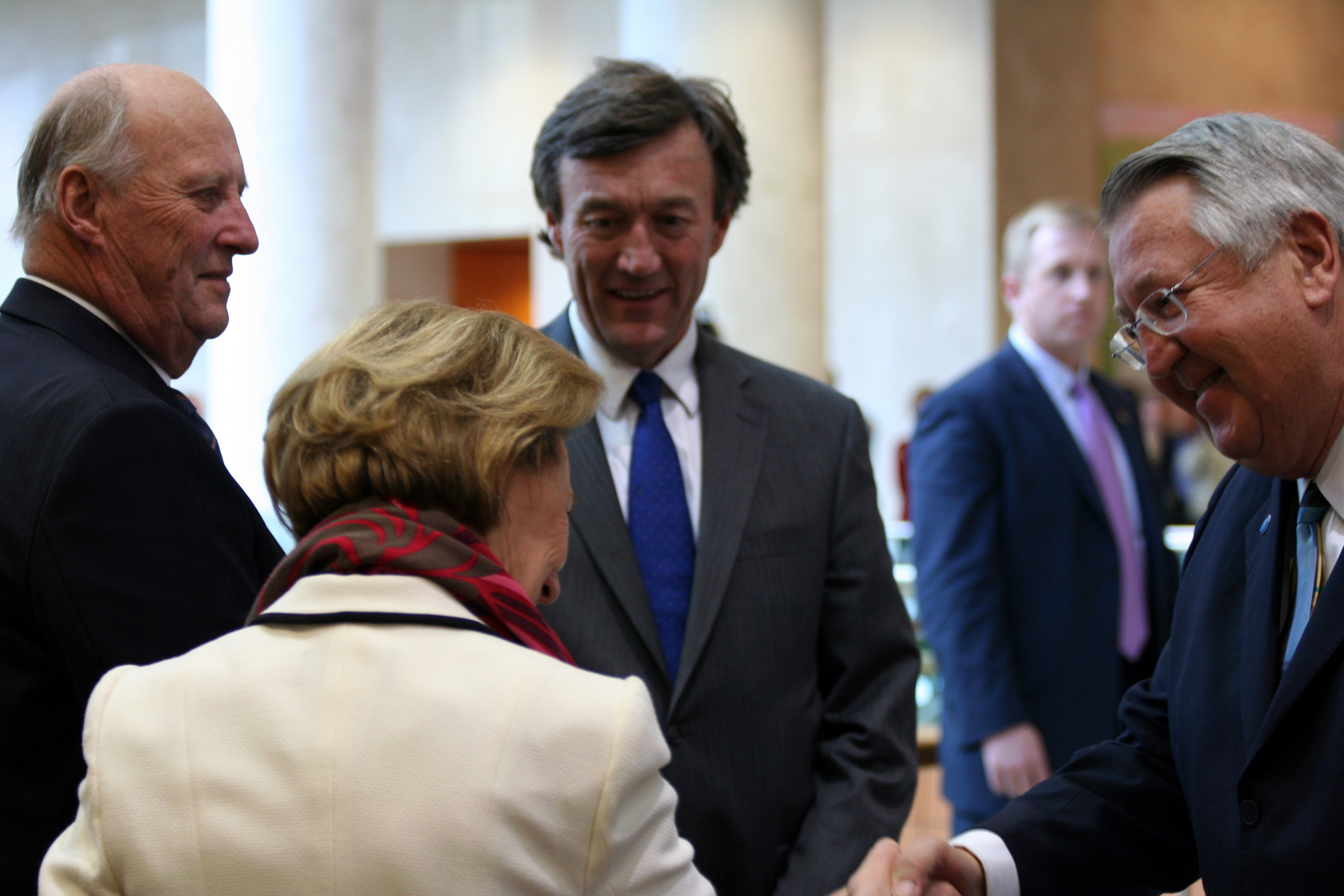
Brede (right) meeting the King and Queen of Norway at the Mayo Clinic in 2011

Ardell Brede became Mayor of Rochester Minnesota on January 6, 2003. Prior to being elected, Mayor Brede held numerous positions at the Rochester Methodist Hospital, and the Mayo Clinic of Rochester.

Brede was born on June 23, 1939, in Austin, Minnesota. He received an Associate Degree in commerce from the Austin Junior College in 1959 and took several graduate courses in the University of Minnesota Extension Division program. Brede has also attended management classes and seminars at Brigham Young University and the Rochester Methodist Hospital/Mayo Clinic Rochester.

He was married to his wife Judy from 1961 until her death in 2018. They had three children.

== Politics ==
Although Brede was politically unaffiliated as Mayor of Rochester, he publicly endorsed Democratic candidates, including Hillary Clinton in the 2016 United States presidential election, and has previously endorsed DFL governor Mark Dayton and congressman Tim Walz. Brede has also opposed voter ID laws, urging rejection of a proposed Minnesota constitutional amendment that would require voters to show photo ID, calling it "unnecessary" and "extreme."

== See also ==
- List of mayors of Rochester, Minnesota

== Notes ==
Political offices
Preceded by Chuck Canfield	Mayor of Rochester, Minnesota; 2003–present	Incumbent
