= Soldiers' and Sailors' Monument (Saint Paul, Minnesota) =

Soldiers and Sailors Monument
- United States
- The monument near the Cathedral of Saint Paul
- For Minnesota soldiers and sailors who served in the American Civil War
- Unveiled: November 20, 1903
- Location: 44°56′53″N 93°6′26″W; 187 Summit Avenue, Saint Paul, Minnesota, U.S.
- Designed by: John Karl Daniels

The Soldiers' and Sailors' Monument, also called the Soldiers' and Sailors' Memorial or the St. Paul Civil War Memorial, is a 52.5 ft (16.0 m) pillar monument erected in Saint Paul, Minnesota, dedicated to soldiers and sailors of the state of Minnesota who served in the American Civil War. Originally designed by John Karl Daniels, the monument was formally dedicated on November 20, 1903, at Summit Park along Summit Avenue. The top of the monument features a bronze life-size statue of Josias R. King, who is credited as being the state's first volunteer for the war.

== History ==
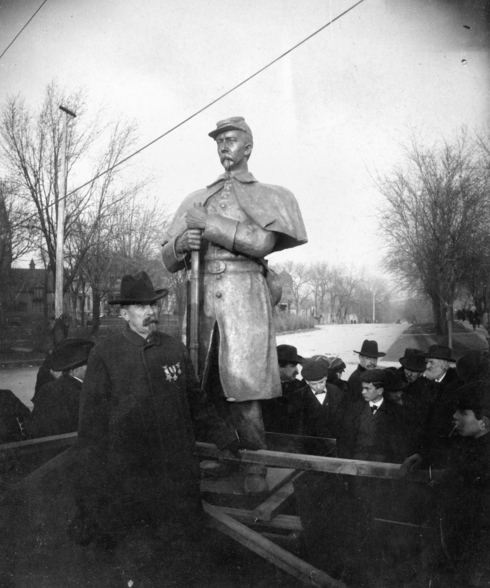
Josias R. King standing in front of the bronze statue of the Soldiers and Sailors Monument modeled after his likeness, November 20, 1903

The Soldiers' and Sailor's Monument is located at Summit Park at the confluence of Summit Avenue and John Ireland Boulevard in downtown Saint Paul. Efforts to create a monument honoring Union soldiers from Minnesota first began in 1861, shortly after the First Battle of Bull Run which Minnesota citizen soldiers from the 1st Minnesota Infantry Regiment took part in. A second major effort to create a Minnesota monument was spearheaded during the 1890s by the Saint Paul-based Acker Post 21 of the Grand Army of the Republic. Later, in 1897 following a GAR encampment in Saint Paul more efforts were made by the veteran community to establish a state dedicated memorial towards Union soldiers. A formal committee was formed to design and raise funds for a Soldiers' and Sailors' Monument. Ultimately the committee chose Brigadier General Josias R. King, a colleague of James J. Hill, as the model for the monument. The monument was designed by Norwegian-American sculptor John Karl Daniels who contributed towards other Saint Paul monuments including the statues of Alexander Wilkin and John B. Sanborn inside the rotunda of the Minnesota State Capitol and the Leif Erikson and Knute Nelson memorials at the Minnesota State Capitol Mall among others.

The monument was dedicated on November 20, 1903, to a crowd of 4,000 citizens along with fellow Civil War veterans, Sons of Union Veterans of the Civil War, Philippine–American War and Spanish–American War veterans, and military personnel from Fort Snelling. A speech was made by the mayor of North St. Paul, Minnesota and Civil War veteran Henry A. Castle, along with Robert A. Smith, the mayor Saint. The statue was originally dedicated on a small triangular plot of land in the middle of Kellogg Boulevard in Saint Paul in 1903, now part of old 4th Avenue and Dayton Avenue. The statue was later moved to Summit Avenue in 1906, following a realignment of Summit Avenue.

== Design ==
The monument's design is neoclassical, taking inspiration from similar victory columns of the era which were popular especially during the Gilded Age in the United States. The monument stands at 52.5 ft (16.0 m) tall, the monument's base is made of Minnesota granite, while the pillar of the monument is constructed of barre granite or "Vermont granite".

The monument features four bronze relief panels which detail the monuments history and dedication. The first panel (north side) discusses the preservation of the Union of states, the emancipation of slaves, and the advancement of liberty. The second panel (east side) discusses the funders of the monument and the recognition of to Josias R. King as the first Minnesotan to volunteer for service in the Union Army. The third panel (south side) features a relief of the Grand Army of the Republic membership medal. The fourth panel (west) is dedicated to the memory and remembrance of all Union soldiers who served from 1861 to 1865 as well as their sacrifices and devotion to preserving the United States.

While King is regarded as one of the first volunteers for the 1st Minnesota Infantry Regiment and widely recognized as the first volunteer from the state of Minnesota, King for the majority of his military career served in the Sioux Wars. While King did originally enlist in the 1st Minnesota and served at the First Battle of Bull Run in companies A and G as a Sergeant and Captain from 1861 to 1863, King was quickly promoted to the rank of Major shortly before the Battle of Gettysburg and primarily served as the aide-de-camp of Alfred Sully during Sully's Expedition against the Dakota people and fought at the Battle of Whitestone Hill, the Battle of Killdeer Mountain, and the Battle of the Badlands. The monument itself makes no mention of King's service in the aftermath of the Dakota War of 1862 which is where the majority of King's military service took place.

== Restoration ==
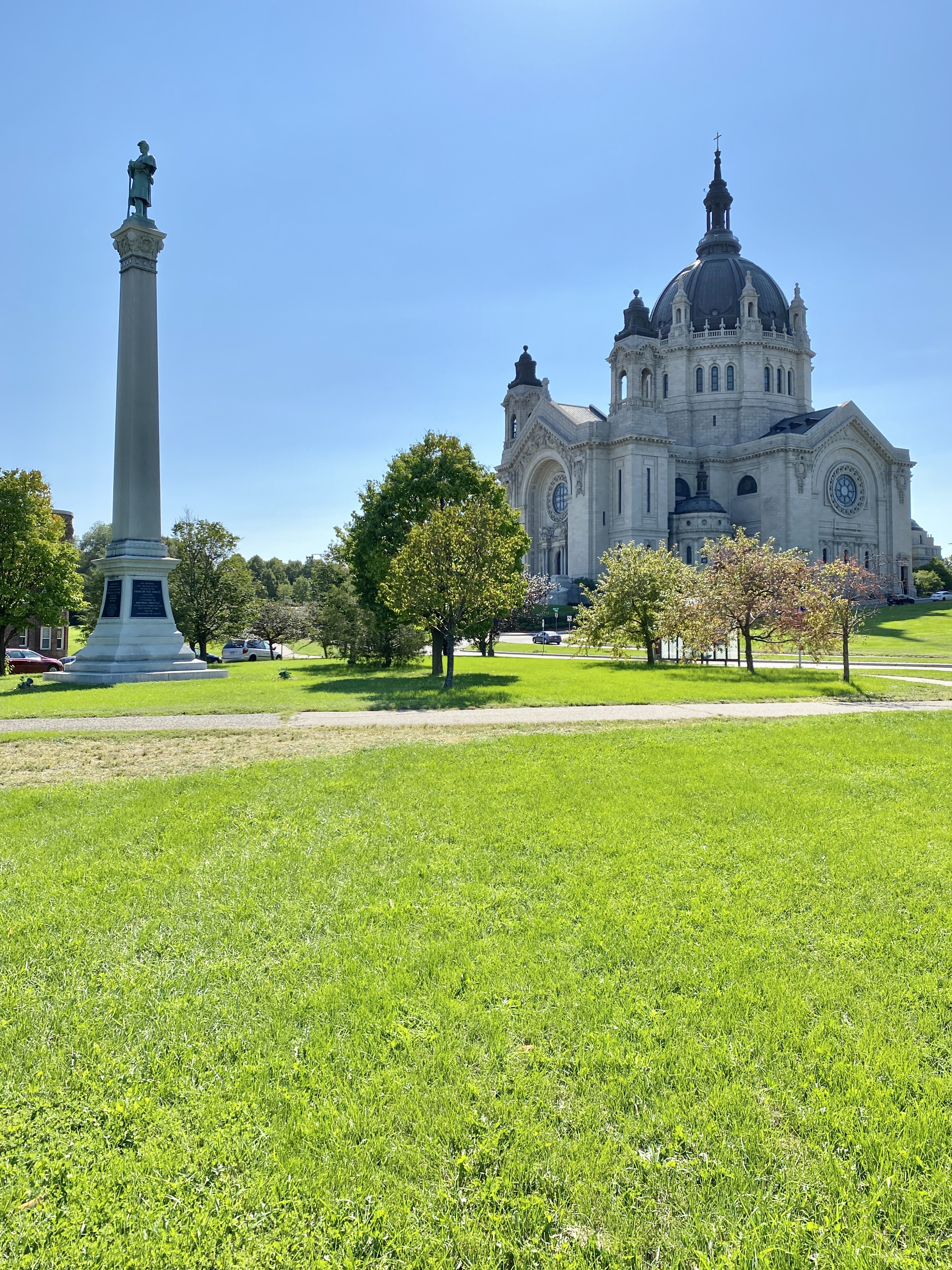
The Soldiers' and Sailors' Monument in the foreground with the Cathedral of Saint Paul in the background in 2021

The Soldiers' and Sailors' Monument has undergone several restoration processes, a light was installed in 2013 and in 2016 $60,000 was awarded by the Minnesota Historical Society to refurbish and restore the monument. The monument is owned by the city of Saint Paul and is maintained by the city government.
