= Allen J. Furlow =

American politician

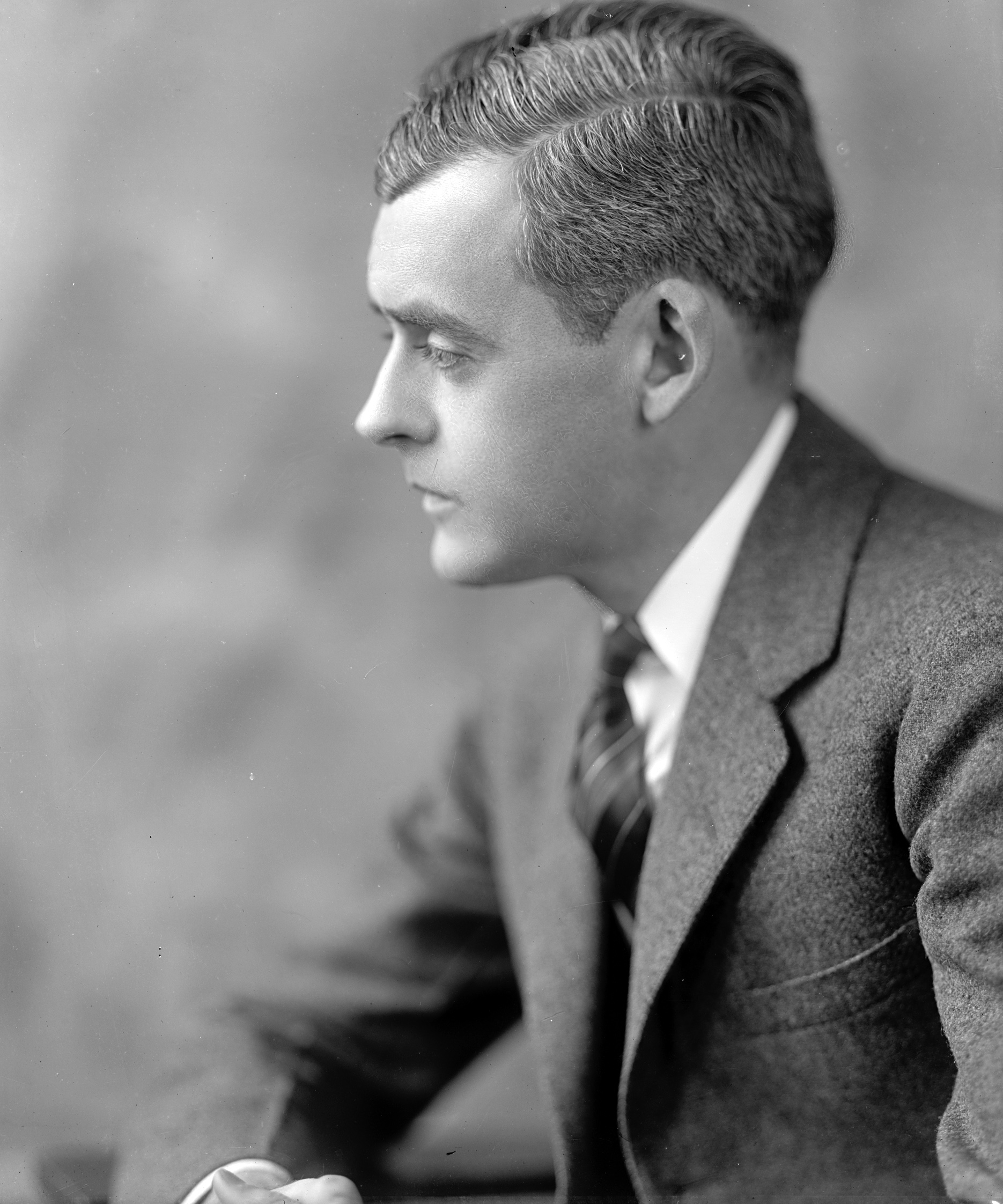

Member of the U.S. House of Representatives from Minnesota's 1st district
- In office March 4, 1925 – March 3, 1929
- Preceded by: Sydney Anderson
- Succeeded by: Victor Christgau

Personal details
- Born: November 9, 1890 Rochester, Minnesota, U.S.
- Died: January 29, 1954 (aged 63) Rochester, Minnesota, U.S.
- Resting place: Oakwood Cemetery
- Party: Republican

Allen John Furlow Sr. (November 9, 1890 – January 29, 1954) was a Minnesota congressman and lawyer. Born in Rochester, Minnesota, Furlow attended public schools, graduating from Rochester High School in 1910. During the First World War, Furlow served overseas as an aviation pilot in the Army where he rose to the rank of First Lieutenant.

Furlow graduated from the law department of George Washington University, Washington, D.C., in 1920. He was admitted to the bar in 1920 and began practice in Rochester, Minnesota. He was a member of the Minnesota Senate from 1923 to 1925. He then was elected as a Republican to the 69th and 70th United States Congresses (March 4, 1925 - March 3, 1929). He was unsuccessful as a candidate for renomination in 1928.

Furlow then took employment in the legal department of the Curtiss-Wright Corporation, Washington, D.C., in 1929 and 1930. In 1933, he was appointed by the United States Attorney General as a special assistant in cases assigned under the Petroleum Code. Furlow was in the legal department of the Veterans Administration, Washington, D.C., from 1934 to 1937 before returning to Rochester, Minnesota, where he practiced law until his death in 1954. Furlow was buried in Oakwood Cemetery, Rochester, Minnesota.

His son, Dr. William Loomis Furlow, was a prominent urologist at the Mayo Clinic, Rochester, Minnesota.

U.S. House of Representatives
Preceded by Sydney Anderson	U.S. Representative from Minnesota's 1st congressional district 1925–1929	Succeeded by Victor Christgau
