= List of mayors of Rochester, Minnesota =

Current Mayor Kim Norton in 2019

This is a list of people who have served as mayor of Rochester, Minnesota. All mayors are officially non-partisan.

| No. | Image | Mayor | Term |
|---|---|---|---|
| 1 | | Moses W. Fay | 1858–1859 |
| 2 | | Frederick Augustus Olds | 1859–1860 |
| 3 | | William D. Hurlbut | 1860–1861 |
| 4 | | John Clark | 1861–1862 |
| 5 | | Lowell B. Bliss | 1862–1864, 1868–1869 |
| 6 | | Abram Ozmun | 1864–1865 |
| 7 | | John V. Daniels | 1865–1866 |
| 8 | | Ozora P. Stearns | 1866–1868 |
| 9 | | Daniel Heaney | 1869–1870 |
| 10 | | Frederick Taft Olds | 1870–1871 |
| 11 | | Orlan P. Whitcomb | 1871–1872 |
| 12 | | George W. Van Dusen | 1872–1873 |
| 13 | | Dennis H. Williams | 1873–1875 |
| 14 | | Daniel A. Morrison | 1875–1879 |
| 15 | | Lyman E. Cowdery | 1879–1880 |
| 16 | | Samuel Whitten | 1880–1882 |
| 17 | | Dr. William Worrall Mayo | 1882–1883 |
| 18 | | Samuel Whitten | 1883–1885 |
| 19 | | Orson Sage Porter | 1885–1887 |
| 20 | | Andrew Nelson | 1887–1889 |
| 21 | | Orson Sage Porter | 1889–1890 |
| 22 | | Delbert Darling | 1890–1892 |
| 23 | | Dr. Horace H. Witherstine | 1892–1895 |
| 24 | | Dr. Wilson A. Allen | 1895–1896 |
| (23) | | Dr. Horace H. Witherstine | 1896–189 |
| 25 | | Joseph H. Wagoner | 1897–1898 |
| 25 | | Burt Winslow Eaton | 1898–1899 |
| 27 | | James Arthur Melone | 1899–1900 |
| 28 | | Dr. E. L. Sinclair | 1900–1902 |
| (23) | | Dr. Horace H. Witherstine | 1902–1903 |
| 29 | | Archie C. Stevenson | 1903–1905 |
| 30 | | Martin Heffron | 1905–1907 |
| 31 | | Julius J. Reiter | 1907–1909 |
| 32 | | J. C. Thompson | 1909–1911 |
| 33 | | William B. Richardson | 1911–1917 |
| (31) | | Julius J. Reiter | 1917–1919 |
| 34 | | C. D. Brown | 1919–1923 |
| (31) | | Julius J. Reiter | 1923–1925 |
| 35 | | John T. Lemmon | 1925–1927, 1930–1931 |
| (34) | | C. D. Brown (died in office December 22, 1927) | 1927 |
| 36 | | Fred W. Haase | 1928–1929 |
| (31) | | Julius J. Reiter | 1931–1935 |
| 37 | | W. A. Moore | 1935–1939 |
| 38 | | Paul Grassle | 1939–1947 |
| 39 | | Claude H. McQuillan | 1947–1951 |
| 40 | | Glenn O. Amundsen | 1951–1953 |
| (39) | | Claude H. McQuillan (died in office November 16, 1957) | 1951–1957 |
| 41 | | Adolph M. Bach | 1957–1958 |
| 42 | | Alexander P. Smetka | 1958–1969 |
| 43 | | Dewey Day | 1969–1973 |
| (42) | | Alexander P. Smetka | 1973–1979 |
| 44 | | Chuck Hazama | 1979–1995 |
| 45 | | Chuck Canfield | 1995–2003 |
| 46 | | Ardell Brede | 2003–2019 |
| 47 | | Kim Norton | 2019–present |
