= Allen College =

Private university in Waterloo, Iowa, US

- Type: Private healthcare-focused
- Established: 1925
- Chancellor: Jared Seliger
- Provost: Bob Loch
- Students: 625
- Location: Waterloo, Iowa, U.S.
- Website: www.allencollege.edu

Allen College is a private university focused on healthcare and located in Waterloo, Iowa.

== History ==
In 1925, Allen Memorial Hospital and Allen Memorial Hospital School of Nursing were opened. The school was closed as a result of the Great Depression. It reopened in 1942, and in 1989 the school became Allen College of Nursing. The school was renamed Allen College in 1997.

== Academics ==
Allen College offers undergraduate and graduate degrees in the fields of nursing and health science.

== Accreditation ==
Allen College's programs have been accredited by numerous organizations. The school has been accredited by The Higher Learning Commission of the North Central Association of Colleges and Schools since January 1, 1995.

The Bachelor of Science in Nursing (BSN), Master of Science in Nursing (MSN), and Doctor of Nursing Practice (DNP) degrees have been accredited by the Commission on Collegiate Nursing Education (CCNE).

The Associate Degree of Science in Radiography is accredited by Joint Review Committee on Education in Radiologic Technology (JRCERT).

The Bachelor of Health Sciences in Medical Laboratory Science is accredited by the National Accrediting Agency for Clinical Laboratory Sciences (NAACLS).

The Bachelor of Health Science in Diagnostic Medical Sonography is accredited by the Commission on Accreditation of Allied Health Education Programs (CAAHEP).

Allen College's BSN, MSN, and DNP programs have been approved by the Iowa Board of Nursing (IBN). The BSN program first received IBN approval in March 1990.

== Diversity initiatives ==
In recent years, the College has been attempting to promote diversity on their campus. They have added an Office of Diversity Services as well as a Diversity Advisory Council.

The Office of Diversity Services (ODS) aims to create an inclusive environment for all students. Their main objective is to "identify and remove institutional barriers to inclusiveness and cultural awareness for the student body, the faculty, staff, patients, administrators and the entire campus community." The ODS recognizes that, among others, minorities, men, and international students have historically been underrepresented in the nursing and health science industries.

The school's initiatives have been recognized by the Greater Cedar Valley Alliance and Chamber. In their 2014 annual report, they awarded the College with their Diversity and Inclusion Award.

== Notable alumni ==
- Liz Boldon, nurse and member of the Minnesota House of Representatives

== See also ==
- List of nursing schools in the United States
