= Edward Henry Ozmun =

American politician

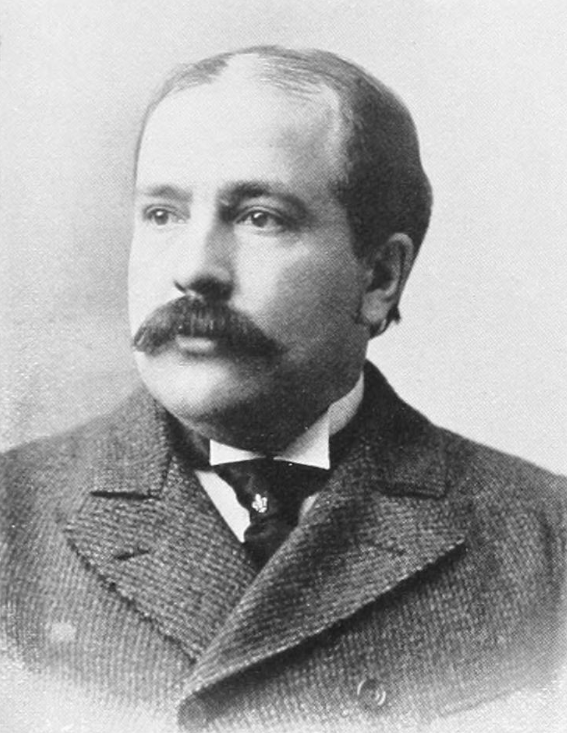

Member of the Minnesota State Senate
- In office 1895–1898

Personal details
- Born: August 6, 1857 Rochester, Minnesota, United States
- Died: December 9, 1910 (aged 53) Constantinople, Ottoman Empire
- Party: Republican
- Spouse: Clara B. Goodman (m. 1894)
- Children: 1
- Education: University of Michigan
- Occupation: Lawyer, diplomat, politician

Edward Henry Ozmun (August 6, 1857 – December 9, 1910) was an American lawyer, diplomat, and politician.

== Biography ==
Edward Henry Ozmun was born in Rochester, Minnesota on August 6, 1857. His father was Abram Ozmun, who served in the Minnesota State Legislature and as mayor of Rochester.

Ozmun married Clara B. Goodman on November 21, 1894, and they had one daughter.

He went to the University of Wisconsin. He then received his bachelor's and law degree from the University of Michigan. He practiced law in Saint Paul, Minnesota. He served in the Minnesota State Senate from 1895 to 1898 as a Republican. Ozmun then served in the United States Consular Service. He was first stationed in Stuttgart, Germany. In 1905, he became consul-general at Istanbul, Ottoman Empire, serving until his death there on December 9, 1910.
