= Chuck Hazama =

American politician (1932–2021)

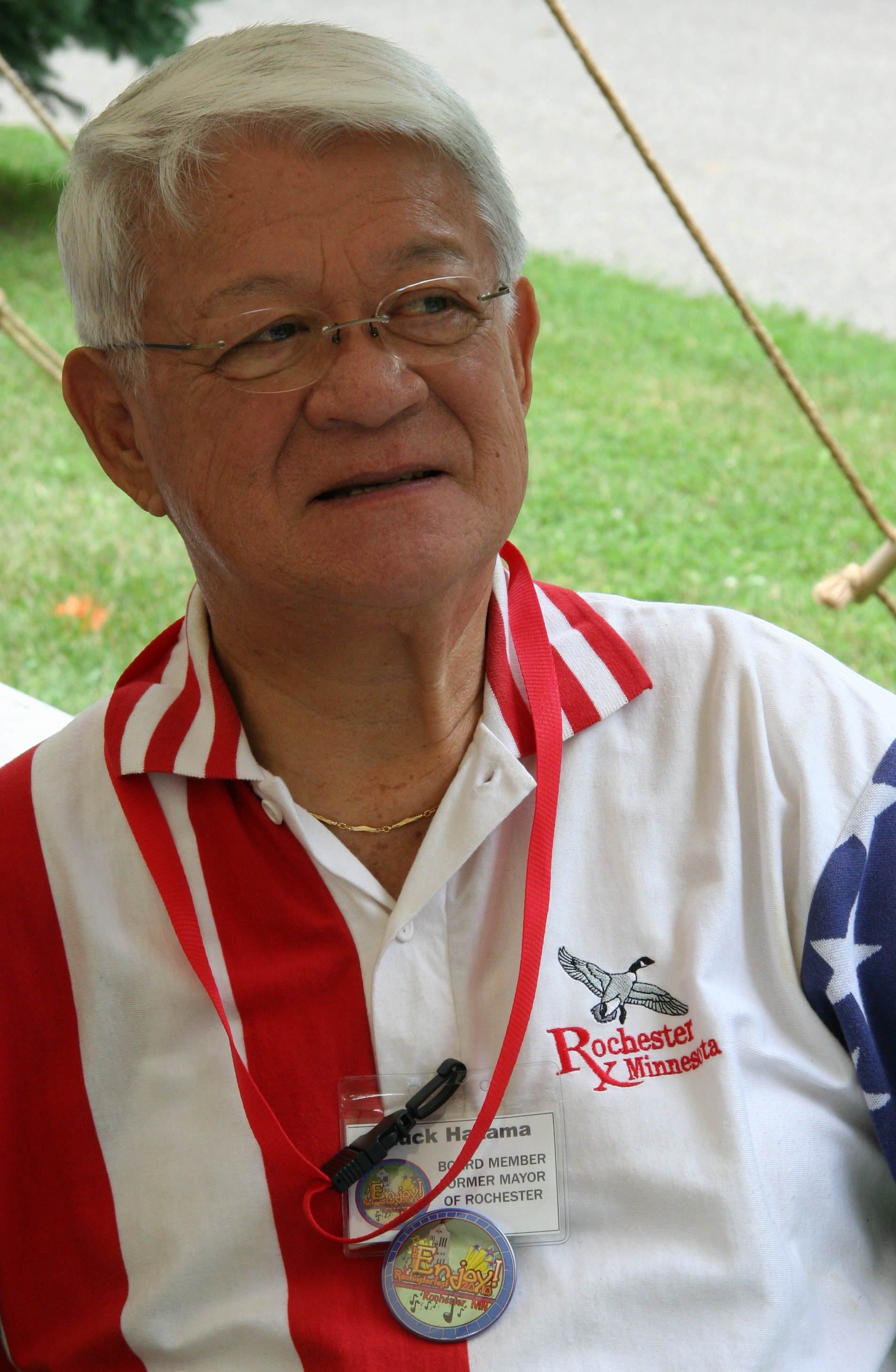

44th Mayor of Rochester, Minnesota
- In office January 6, 1979 – January 6, 1995
- Preceded by: Alexander P. Smetka
- Succeeded by: Chuck Canfield

Personal details
- Born: 1932 Hawaii
- Died: November 28, 2021 (aged 89) Rochester, Minnesota, US
- Party: Independent
- Spouse: Aly Hazama
- Education: University of Northern Iowa

Charles K. Hazama (September 1, 1932 – November 28, 2021) was an American politician who served as mayor of Rochester, Minnesota, for eight terms, from 1979 to 1995. Before he was Mayor, he served as the executive director of the Rochester YMCA. Hazama worked to promote Rochester, and his efforts were recognized when Money magazine named Rochester the number one place to live in 1993. He also worked to create a citywide system for flood control following Rochester's flood of 1978. In 1995, Chuck Hazama did not seek re-election and was succeeded by Chuck Canfield.

Hazama also served on the Advisory Council of Malulani Hospitals, where he was a director of the Nisei Veterans Memorial Center. He attended University of Northern Iowa, class of 1957. He also served as the honorary chair for Rochester's Sesquicentennial Celebration in 2004. His wife Aly died in 2002. Chuck has two children: Son, Charles K. Hazama, born in 1959 and daughter, Ann Hazama born in 1961.

Chuck Hazama died at the age of 89 on November 28, 2021, in Rochester, Minnesota.

== See also ==
- List of mayors of Rochester, Minnesota
