= Liz Boldon =

American politician and nurse

- Boldon in 2026

Member of the Minnesota Senate from the 25th district
- Incumbent
- Assumed office January 3, 2023
- Preceded by: Dave Senjem

Member of the Minnesota House of Representatives from the 25B district
- In office January 5, 2021 – January 3, 2023
- Preceded by: Duane Sauke
- Succeeded by: Andy Smith

Personal details
- Born: Waterloo, Iowa, U.S.
- Party: Democratic (DFL)
- Children: 3
- Education: Allen College (BSN); University of Phoenix (MS)

Liz Boldon is a Minnesota politician serving as a member of the Minnesota Senate. A member of the Democratic-Farmer-Labor Party, she represents District 25, which includes much of Rochester and Olmsted County, Minnesota.

== Early life and education ==
Boldon was born in Waterloo, Iowa. She earned a Bachelor of Science in Nursing from Allen College and a Master of Science in nursing education from the University of Phoenix.

== Career ==
Since 2002, Boldon has worked as a nurse at the Mayo Clinic.

Boldon was one of 200 activists who were arrested in November 2021 in Washington, D.C., for blocking a sidewalk near the White House at a protest in support of the John Lewis Voting Rights Advancement Act and Freedom to Vote Act, two voting rights bills. The demonstration was organized by the League of Women Voters, People For the American Way, and Declaration for American Democracy. Boldon was issued a $50 citation, which she paid.

== Minnesota House of Representatives ==
Boldon served in the Minnesota House of Representatives from 2021 to 2023.

== Minnesota Senate ==
Boldon succeeded retiring State Senator Dave Senjem in the 2022 election, defeating Republican nominee Ken Navitsky, 59% to 39%. She serves as Assistant Majority Leader in the 93rd Minnesota Legislature.
