= Horace H. Witherstine =

American politician

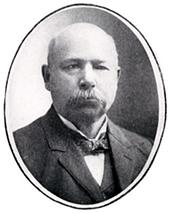

Member of the Minnesota Senate

21st Mayor of Rochester, Minnesota

Personal details
- Born: April 2, 1852 Herkimer, New York, U.S.
- Died: October 2, 1924 (aged 72) Rochester, Minnesota, U.S.
- Party: Democratic
- Education: Rush Medical College
- Occupation: Physician, politician

Horace H. "H. H." Witherstine (April 2, 1852 – October 2, 1924) was an American physician and politician.

== Biography ==
Born on April 2, 1852, in Herkimer, New York, he attended Fairfield Academy, then moved to Rochester, Minnesota in 1872 where he was a school teacher. In 1884, he received his medical degree from Rush Medical College and returned to Rochester to practice medicine. He was mayor of Rochester from 1892 to 1903, served on the school board, and was editor of the Rochester Bulletin newspaper. From 1903 to 1910, he served in the Minnesota Senate as a Democrat. He died in an auto accident two miles north of Rochester while on a house call. He died on October 2, 1924, aged 72, in Rochester.
