= 1988 Minnesota House of Representatives election =

- November 8, 1988

All 134 seats in the Minnesota House of Representatives 68 seats needed for a majority
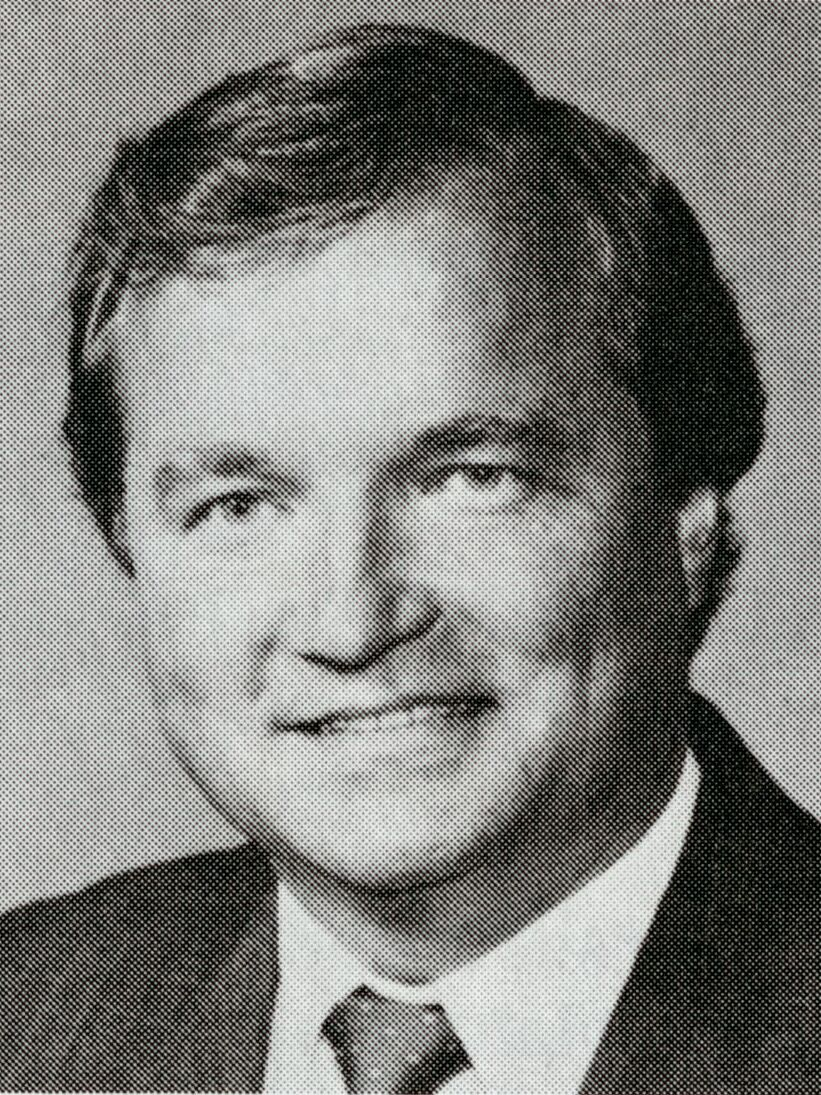
| | Majority party | Minority party |
|---|---|---|
| Leader | Bob Vanasek | Bill Schreiber |
| Party | Democratic (DFL) | Ind.-Republican |
| Leader since | June 2, 1987 | November 8, 1986 |
| Leader's seat | 25A–New Prague | 48B–Brooklyn Park |
| Last election | 83 seats | 51 seats |
| Seats before | 82 | 52 |
| Seats won | 81 | 53 |
| Seat change | ▼1 | ▲1 |
| Popular vote | 1,059,605 | 946,820 |
Speaker before election
Bob Vanasek
Democratic (DFL)
Elected Speaker
Bob Vanasek
Democratic (DFL)

The 1988 Minnesota House of Representatives election was held in the U.S. state of Minnesota on November 8, 1988, to elect members to the House of Representatives of the 76th Minnesota Legislature. A primary election was held on September 13, 1988.

The Minnesota Democratic–Farmer–Labor Party (DFL) won a majority of seats, remaining the majority party, followed by the Independent-Republicans of Minnesota. The new Legislature convened on January 3, 1989.

== Results ==
Summary of the November 8, 1988 Minnesota House of Representatives election results
| Party | Candidates | Votes | Seats | | |
| Party | Candidates | Votes | No. | ∆No. | % |
|---|---|---|---|---|---|
| Minnesota Democratic–Farmer–Labor Party | 130 | 1,059,605 | 81 | ▼1 | 60.45 |
| Independent-Republicans of Minnesota | 128 | 946,820 | 53 | ▲1 | 39.55 |
| American Party of Minnesota | N/A | 1,338 | 0 | Steady | 0.00 |
| Independent | N/A | 3,335 | 0 | Steady | 0.00 |
| Total | | | 134 | ±0 | 100.00 |
| Turnout (out of 3,087,194 eligible voters) | 2,125,119 | 68.84% | | ▲20.67 pp | |
Source: Minnesota Secretary of State, Minnesota Legislative Reference Library

== See also ==
- Minnesota Senate election, 1986
- Minnesota gubernatorial election, 1986
