= Abram Ozmun =

American politician

Abraham Ozmun (August 31, 1814 – November 29, 1887) was an American farmer and politician.

Born in Tompkins County, New York, Ozmun moved to Illinois and then settled in Minnesota Territory in 1856. He was a farmer and then was in the hardware business in Rochester, Minnesota. He served in the Minnesota House of Representatives from 1859 to 1860. He then served as mayor of Rochester, Minnesota from 1864 to 1865. His son, Edward Henry Ozmun, also served in the Minnesota Legislature.
