= George W. and Nancy B. Van Dusen House =

Historic house in Minnesota, United States

- U.S. National Register of Historic Places
- Minneapolis Landmark
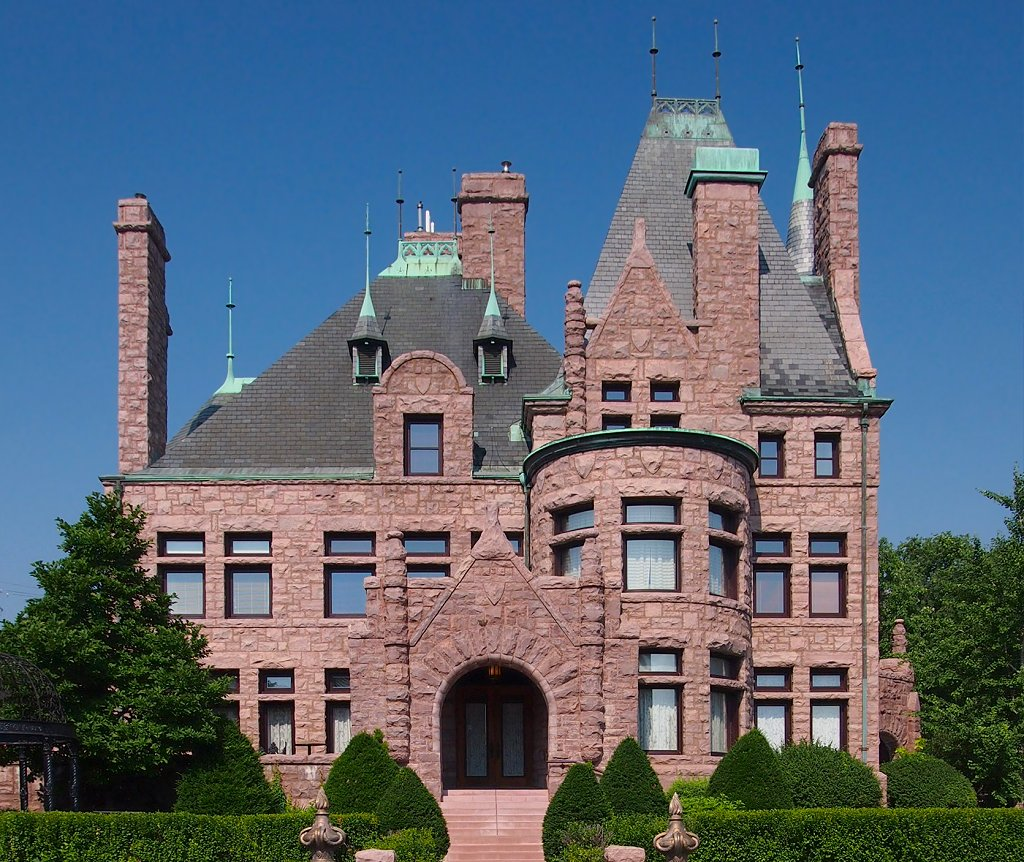
- The Van Dusen House from the east

- Location within Minnesota Location within the United States
- Location: 1900 LaSalle Avenue, Minneapolis, Minnesota
- Coordinates: 44°57′50″N 93°16′47″W
- Built: 1893
- Architect: Edgar E. Joralemon
- Architectural style: Renaissance, Richardsonian Romanesque
- NRHP reference No.: 95000607

Significant dates
- Added to NRHP: May 18, 1995
- Designated MPLSL: 1995

The George W. and Nancy B. Van Dusen House is a mansion in the Stevens Square neighborhood of Minneapolis, Minnesota, United States. The owner, George Washington Van Dusen, was an entrepreneur who founded Minnesota's first and most prosperous grain processing and distribution firm in 1883. In 1891, he hired the firm of Orff and Joralemon to build a 12,000-square-foot (1,100 m^{2}) mansion on what was then the southwestern edge of Minneapolis. His house reflects the prosperity achieved by business owners who were making money in the flourishing grain, railroad, and lumber industries in the late 19th century. The mansion was listed on the National Register of Historic Places in 1995.

The exterior is built of pink Sioux quartzite quarried near Luverne, Minnesota. The roof and turrets are covered with Maine slate. The mansion is generally within the Richardsonian Romanesque form, but it also has French Renaissance design elements, such as steep roofs, and a soaring, slender turret topped with a copper finial. The interior mixes elements of French, Gothic, Tudor, Romanesque, and Elizabethan styles. It contains ten fireplaces, a grand staircase, large skylights, carved woodwork, parquet floors, and a tile mosaic in the entryway.

George Van Dusen was born on July 10, 1826. He married Nancy Barden, his third wife, on November 29, 1860. He started the G.W. Van Dusen & Co. grain company in Rochester, Minnesota, which by 1889 merged with a Minneapolis company to become Van Dusen-Harrington. This eventually became part of the Peavey Company, acquired by ConAgra in 1982. Van Dusen is credited with naming Byron, Minnesota after the town of Port Byron, New York, where he once lived, though his father Laurence had been born in Byron Center, Genesee County, New York.

The Van Dusens are said to have survived a tornado that destroyed a previous home and as a result the mansion has some unique features including I-beam construction that supposedly made the home tornado-proof. Additionally, tunnels, which may have been for emergency use, radiated from the building into the yard.

== Non-residential use ==
After its initial residential use, several non-residential conversions altered the mansion. In 1961 a large modern addition was added to the mansion. Organizations that operated from the mansion over the years include the Hamline University Law School, U.S. Communications, and Horst International Education Center, a predecessor of the Aveda Corporation.

== Vacant period and decline ==
After the Horsts sold the home for approximately $400,000, it sat vacant from 1987 through 1994. The new owners never raised the capital needed for restoration. During this time, some of the woodwork deteriorated, some internal fixtures were pilfered, and attempts were made to remove tiles from fireplaces. Philip Maise, who was restoring another home one street over, was tempted to purchase the property after the Stevens Square Community Organization dedicated $300,000 from its Neighborhood Revitalization Program to assist a new owner with restoration. Maise attempted to negotiate an agreeable sale price, and when that failed, attempted to purchase the mortgage from underneath the owners. At the last moment, the owners purchased the mortgage themselves and stymied Maise's hostile takeover. It was a few months later that much of the remaining original fixtures were stolen from the home and Maise broke off further attempts to take over the property.

== Restoration by Bob Poehling ==
In December 1994, Bob Poehling purchased the property for $210,000. This was reportedly just two weeks before it would have been demolished. After purchasing, Poehling and project architect David Sabaka oversaw an extensive restoration. This included restoring the exterior finishes, replacing windows, installing a new heating system, and repairing external and internal doors. Local craftspeople and artisans repaired and refinished woodwork, and a California carpenter replaced staircase balusters and bead molding. The carriage house and grand parlor were modernized to house meetings and events. Since its restoration, the Van Dusen Mansion has been one of Minneapolis' most popular wedding venues, most recently receiving the 2019 "Best Unique Venue" award from Minnesota Bride Magazine.

== Mansion's use in Ponzi scheme ==
In April 2008, Poehling sold the mansion for $2.6 million to Trevor Cook. Cook, then a 37-year-old Minneapolis investment advisor, had a trail of regulatory sanctions and lawsuits pending. A week later, the property was flipped for the same price into the account of Oxford Global Advisors, a firm managed by Bo Beckman. Beckman, who claimed to be among the nation's top money managers, steered investors into programs run by Cook in exchange for "rebates." However, lawsuits between parties claims this transfer was fraudulent.

The odd ownership arrangements and disputes were only a hint that strange dealings were going on. Cook's and Beckman's real intent appears to have been to utilize the prestige of the Van Dusen mansion to entice prospective investors in periodic seminars held at the mansion to promote investing in "The Oxford Group." In reality, it was nothing more than a Ponzi scheme. After pleading guilty in 2010 Cook began serving a 25-year federal prison sentence. Beckman was charged with raising about $47.3 million of the $194 million gathered in the overall fraud and was convicted in June 2012 on fraud and tax charges.
