= George W. Van Dusen =

American businessman (1826–1915)

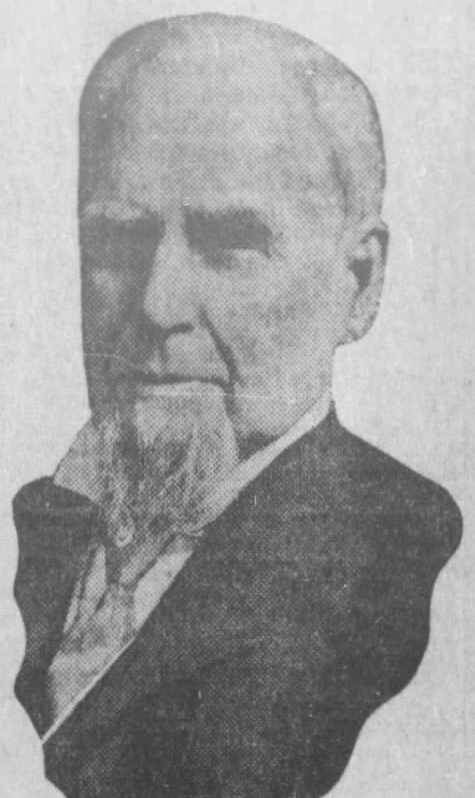
- Born: George Washington Van Dusen; July 10, 1826
- Died: February 24, 1915 (aged 88); California, USA
- Occupation: Businessman
- Spouses: Mary Armstrong (m. 1848) Percis Barden (m. 1855) Nancy Barden (m. 1860)

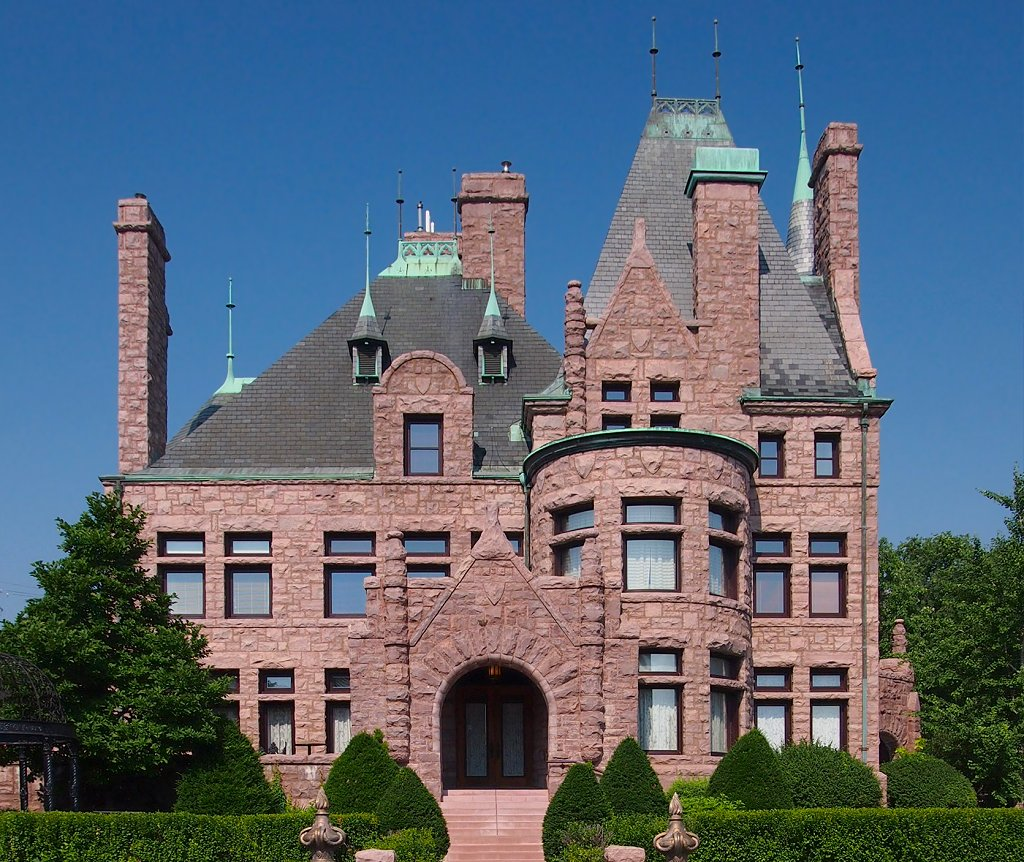
George Van Dusen grew wealthy and built the impressive Van Dusen House in Minneapolis, Minnesota in 1892. It is now on the National Register of Historic Places.

George Washington Van Dusen (July 10, 1826 – February 24, 1915) was from a New York family; his father, Laurence, was born in Byron Center, Genesee County, New York. Van Dusen was a grain dealer; one of many businessmen to become very rich from the milling boom in Minnesota during the second half of the 19th century.

In 1852, George Van Dusen began working as a grain buyer in Pardeeville, Wisconsin. As this was prior to the construction of the LaCrosse & Milwaukee Railway in 1956, the grain was hauled by team overland about 90 miles to Milwaukee, Wisconsin. He followed the trade westward to Rochester, Minnesota where in 1865 he began building grain elevators and warehouses along railroad lines under his G.W. Van Dusen & Co. The Winona and St. Peter Railroad was completed through town to Kasson, Minnesota that same year. Just east of Kasson was a settlement known as Bear Grove. Van Dusen built a warehouse there, and is credited with renaming the village to its present name of Byron after the town of Port Byron, New York, where he once lived, while honoring his father's birthplace, as well. The Chicago and North Western Railway gained control of the Winona and St. Peter in 1867, and the line continued to grow westward.

Charles M. Harrington began working with George Van Dusen in 1883 and Charles eventually headed up Van Dusen business’ Minneapolis office. The Van Dusen-Harrington partnership resulted in an enormous grain processing and distribution business. In 1888, Van Dusen was president and general manager of both the company, then in control of more than 90 elevators stretching from Winona to Pierre, South Dakota, and the Star Eleveator Company. That year, the stock of the two companies was sold to English investors in London, and merged by 1889 with Charles M. Harrington's Minneapolis company to become Van Dusen-Harrington. This eventually became part of the Peavey Company, acquired by ConAgra in 1982. Harrington and Van Dusen organized the Van Dusen-Harrington Company in 1889, becoming one of the largest grain dealers in the world of its time. In 1907, the Van Dusen-Harrington Company and its subsidiaries operated around 400 country grain elevators and owned 50 retail lumber yards.

George Van Dusen was married three times; first, Mary Armstrong around 1848; second, Percis Barden around 1855 and third, Nancy Barden on November 29, 1860. He died in Minneapolis on February 24, 1915. Van Dusen's remains lie in a Mausoleum in the heart of downtown Rochester, Minnesota; the Oakwood Cemetery with the script G.W. Van Dusen engraved into the top header granite above the door at N 44° 01.599 W 092° 27.284 & 15T E 543696 N 4874977.
