= Women of Mayo Clinic =

2016 non-fiction book by Virginia M. Wright-Peterson

- Author: Virginia Wright-Peterson
- Published: 2016
- Publisher: Minnesota Historical Society
- ISBN: 978-1-68134-001-2
- OCLC: 942710568

Women of Mayo Clinic: The Founding Generation is a 2016 non-fiction book by Virginia M. Wright-Peterson, chronicling the individual contributions of professional women who helped establish and develop the Mayo Clinic in Rochester, Minnesota. Covering a period of 60 years, the Sisters of Saint Francis of Rochester, Minnesota worked in conjunction with the Mayo family to open a hospital that would accept patients of all faiths. Beginning with a 27-bed facility, the women physicians and other medical professionals would eventually serve in theaters of war, and create an environment that evolved according to patient needs. Wright-Peterson is a faculty member of the University of Minnesota Rochester, and a former Mayo Clinic administrator.

== Synopsis ==
Disaster struck Rochester, Minnesota on August 21, 1883, when an estimated-F5 tornado devastated the area. With the exception of facilities in Minneapolis-Saint Paul, the state of Minnesota only had three hospitals. Rochester had no medical facilities at that time. Mother Mary Alfred Moes of the Sisters of St. Francis assisted doctors William Mayo and his two sons, William (Dr. Will) and Charles, in caring for the victims. The devastation highlighted the need for a hospital in the Rochester area. The Mayo family and the Sisters of St. Francis worked conjointly to establish a facility open to all without regard to religious affiliation. Dr. William Mayo selected the site, with he and his sons touring hospitals for architectural concepts to best suit their vision. Mother Alfred raised $40.000, and supervised the construction. Initially named St. Mary's Hospital when it opened in 1889, it would eventually become part of the Mayo Clinic after the latter's founding in 1892.

The hospital was small by modern standards, only 27 beds. The facility's first nurse and anesthesiologist Edith Graham, was hired and trained in the operating room by Dr. William Mayo. She in turn trained the Sisters as operating room nurses, and would eventually marry Dr. Charles Mayo. Sisters Sienna Otto, Constantine Koupal, Fidelis Cashion, Hyacinth Quinlan, Fabian Halloran, and Sylvester Burke attended to the needs of the patients 24/7, doing double duty as surgical assistants. Sister Joseph (Julia Dempsey) served in a dual capacity as hospital administrator and Dr. Will's surgical assistant.

The hospital hired without regard to gender. Dr. Gertrude Booker Granger became the hospital's first woman physician in 1898. Physicians Harriet Preston and Ida Clarke were soon added. Nurse Alice Magaw oversaw the anesthesiology department. Dr. Isabella Coler Herb of the Augustana Hospital in Chicago was brought in to organize the pathology department in 1899, the first female specialist in her field. Taking over the lab work previously done by the physicians themselves, she was assisted by the third generation of the Mayo family, granddaughters Daisy Berkman and Helen Berkman.

The Mayo had no functional library when Maud Mellish-Wilson joined as director of publications in 1907. Put in charge of new acquisitions, and preserving papers written by the Mayo doctors, she taught the staff in research practices, and presentation methods. She married the clinic's chief of pathology Louis B. Wilson, and they anonymously wrote Sketch of the History of the Mayo Clinic and the Mayo Foundation. In 1909, she instituted publishing of the annual The Collected Papers of the Mayo Clinic. In 1929, she published the instructional guide The Writing of Medical Papers. Mabel Root became part of the team in 1907, organizing the system for physician records keeping, adding color coding and number assignment to facilitate ease of use.

Four months before the 1914 outbreak of World War I, the Mayo moved to a new building in Rochester. Dr. Gertrude Granger became deputy director of public health. Dr. Leda Stacy was given her own area where she would establish radium therapy. Dutch pathologist Dr. Georgine Luden was added to the staff during this period. Maud Mellish Wilson began hiring more women photographers for the art studio.

After the outbreak of war, the Mayo Clinic deployed teams of nurses to the war front. St. Mary's Nursing School graduate Florence Church Bullard (1880–1967) joined the Red Cross, and was assigned to Evacuation Hospital 13. Continuing there through 1919, Bullard was the first American woman to be recognized by the French government for bravery, receiving the Croix de guerre and bronze star.

In 1915, Doctors Charlie and Will Mayo donated $1.5 million to the University of Minnesota, to foster a program allowing the clinic's doctors to earn master's and doctoral degrees. One of the first graduates was pathologist Della Drips, specializing in gynecologic endocrinology. During the Spanish flu pandemic, Sister Joseph and the Sisters of Saint Francis purchased the nearby Lincoln Hotel and converted it into an isolation hospital in October 1917. By May 1918, when the menace had run its course, 360 patients had been hospitalized and 41 had died.

What there was in the way of social services at the Mayo had been provided at the registration desk by Willa Murray and Cora Olson. Ida Maud Cannon, chief of social services at Massachusetts General Hospital, began training candidates for a new direction in the Mayo's services. Charlotte Bundy was the first to accept the challenge of the clinic's social work. With support from the Mayo, Bundy and nursing student Isabella Gooding set up their practice at the Colonial Hospital. After Bundy married and moved to Scotland, Priscilla Keely became the director. The unit began surveying patients to learn the diverse needs. Services such as a lending library, financial assistance, occupational therapy, and a language interpreter were considered part of the holistic healing of the patient. Cuban-born Beatriz Montes was hired as a language interpreter for Spanish-speaking patients.

After being selected by Sister Joseph at a chance meeting on a hospital tour, Anna Jamme was trained as a nurse. She would later institute the Saint Marys School of Nursing, and become its first administrator. Graduating from the school in 1918, Sister Domitilla, born Lillian DuRocher became hospital administrator in 1939. United States Army medical corp veteran Mary Foley worked at the diet kitchen at the Kahler Corporation, when she became acquainted with Dr. Will Mayo. He hired her for the Mayo, where she instituted the dietetics program for outpatients. Anatomical sculptor Nellie Starkson created presentation 3D wax anatomical images. During her time at the Mayo, pathologist Winifred Ashby developed the Ashby technique for determining red blood cell survival.

Sister Joseph, who retired as a surgical assistant in 1915, and the Sisters of Saint Francis of Rochester, had financed hospital expansions in 1894, 1898, 1904, 1909, 1912 and 1922. Between the years 1913 and 1914, the patient load increased 2600%. A new surgical building, complete with amphitheater for student procedures viewing, opened on Florence Nightingale's birthday in 1922. Another new building was added in 1928. Over the ensuing years, the patient load has continued to rise, as have the opportunities for women in the medical profession.

== Release information ==
- Wright-Peterson, Virginia (2016). Women of Mayo Clinic: the Founding Generation. Minnesota Historical Society. ISBN 978-1-68134-001-2. OCLC 942710568.

== Reception ==
A young aspiring writer and 7th grade student when she read the book, created a board game about the individual women. "The women of Mayo Clinic are empowering and encouraging. These women did amazing things, and it makes me realize I can, too." the young woman told the clinic.

MedCity Beat said, "These stories of more than 40 incredible women have now been artfully recounted by local writer and teacher Virginia Wright-Peterson in her new book, Women of Mayo Clinic: The Founding Generation."
