= Julia Dempsey =

American nurse and hospital administrator (1856–1939)

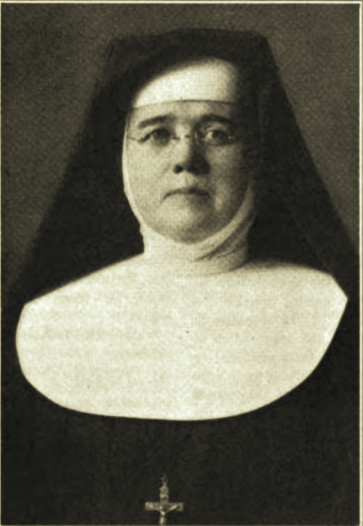
- American Journal of Nursing, 1925
- Born: 14 March 1856; Salamanca, New York
- Died: 29 March 1939 (aged 82); Rochester, Minnesota
- Other name: Sister Mary Joseph
- Scientific career
- Fields: Nursing
- Workplaces: Saint Marys Hospital

Julia Dempsey (14 May 1856 – 29 March 1939), better known as Sister Mary Joseph, was an American religious sister, nurse and hospital administrator.

== Life and work ==
Julia Dempsey was born in Salamanca, New York on 14 May 1856, one of six children in her family. They moved to Rochester, Minnesota when Julia was a child. She took her vows as a member of the Sisters of Saint Francis of Rochester, Minnesota in 1878 and the order trained her as a teacher during her novitiate. Dempsey took the name of Sister Mary Joseph and taught for a dozen years before she returned to Rochester to help staff the newly built Saint Marys Hospital in 1890. Sister Mary Joseph was trained by the only experienced nurse in the city and became the hospital's head nurse and surgical assistant to Dr. William J. Mayo, one of the Mayo brothers that founded the Mayo Clinic. "Even without formal training, she was an excellent nurse, according to Mayo. He noted that her surgical judgment was equal to that of any medical man and that she ranked first among all of his assistants." Sister Mary Joseph remained his assistant until 1915. She became superintendent of the hospital in 1892 and remained in that role until 1939. She founded Saint Mary’s Hospital Training School for Nurses in 1906 to help alleviate a shortage of nurses. She died on 29 March 1939 at Saint Mary's Hospital.

The eponymous phenomenon known as the Sister Mary Joseph nodule refers to a palpable nodule bulging into the umbilicus as a result of metastasis of a malignant cancer in the pelvis or abdomen. She pointed Mayo's attention to the bulge, and he published an article about it in 1928, although the actual term was not coined until 1949 by Hamilton Bailey.

== See also ==
- Women of Mayo Clinic
