= Louis B. Wilson House (Rochester, Minnesota) =

Historic house in Rochester, Minnesota

Coordinates: 44°02′22″N 92°28′34″W

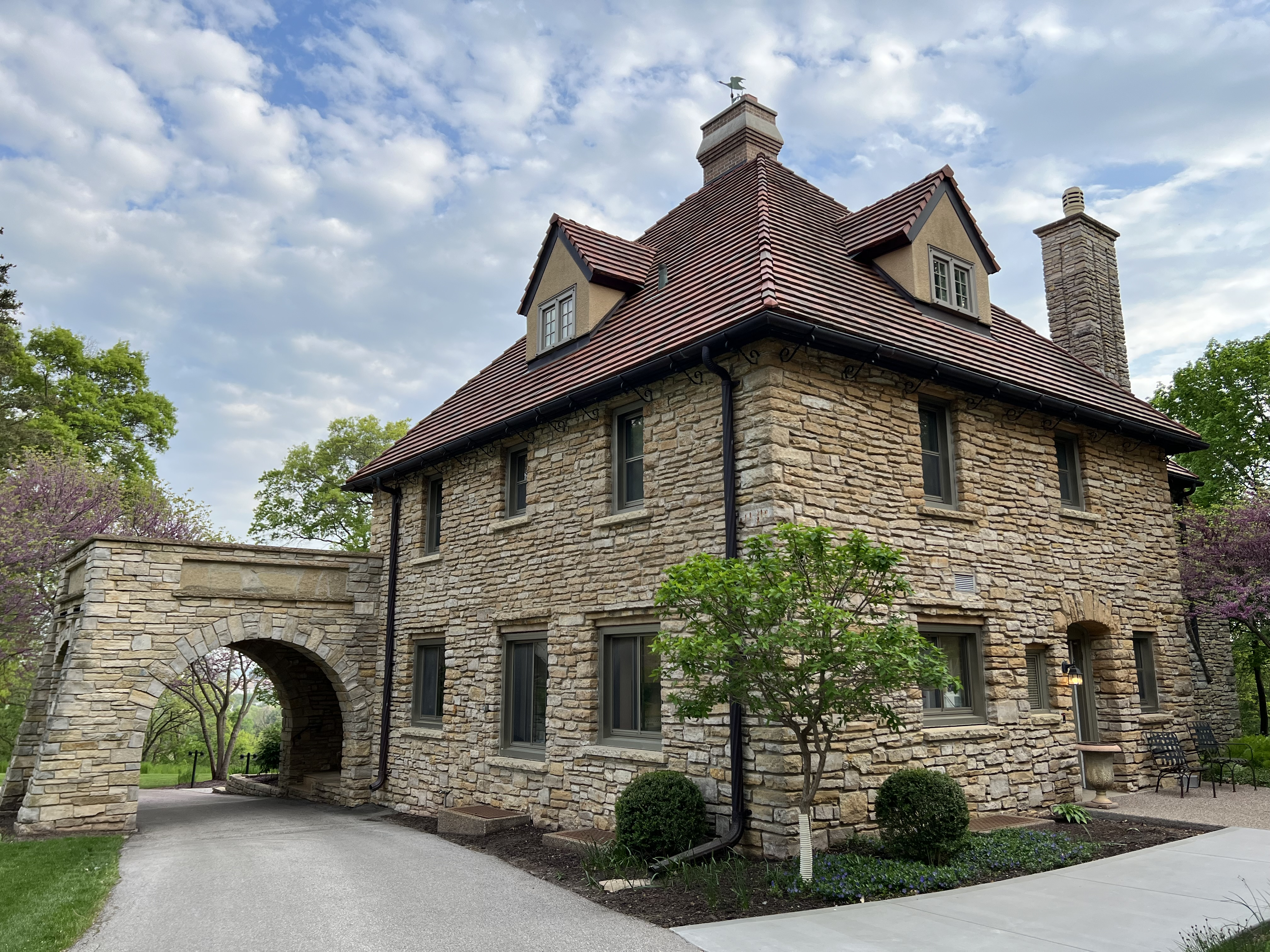
The Louis B. Wilson house, also known as "Walnut Hill"

The Louis B. Wilson House, also known as "Walnut Hill" or "The Wilson House", is the historic home of Louis B. Wilson, acclaimed Mayo Clinic pathologist and pioneer of the frozen section technique, and his wife Maud Mellish-Wilson, Mayo Clinic's librarian and chief editor.

== Description ==
The Wilson House, located in Rochester, Minnesota on the grounds of Assisi Heights, was built between 1924-1925 and is a notable work by Rochester's most prominent architect Harold Crawford. Made of local limestone with a red clay tile roof and sweeping limestone porte-cochère, it is a rare example of Cotswold-inspired Arts and Crafts architecture in southeastern Minnesota, featuring several of Crawford's signature elements including elaborate chimneys and ironwork.

Built at a cost of approximately $35,000 at the time, its interior includes a library finished in mahogany with an English parge ceiling. At this location, Dr. Wilson engaged in many of his hobbies including studying ballistics, photography, and horticulture including apple breeding. At one point, Walnut Hill had fifteen acres of apple orchards including nine varieties of apples.

The Wilson House is owned and maintained by Mayo Clinic and is used for private functions; it is closed to the public but occasionally opens for historical tours held by the Sisters of Saint Francis.
