= Vinyl ether =

Vinyl ether may refer to:

- Any enol ether
- Divinyl ether, a volatile chemical compound once used as an anesthetic
