= Sister Mary Joseph nodule =

Metastatic tumor in the navel

In medicine, the Sister Mary Joseph nodule (sometimes Sister Mary Joseph node or Sister Mary Joseph sign) refers to a palpable nodule bulging into the umbilicus as a result of metastasis of a malignant cancer in the pelvis or abdomen through the round ligament of liver. Sister Mary Joseph nodules can be painful to palpation.

A periumbilical mass is not always a Sister Mary Joseph nodule. Other conditions that can cause a palpable periumbilical mass include umbilical hernia, infection, and endometriosis. Medical imaging, such as abdominal ultrasound, may be used to distinguish a Sister Mary Joseph nodule from another kind of mass.

Gastrointestinal malignancies account for about half of underlying sources (most commonly gastric cancer, colonic cancer or pancreatic cancer, mostly of the tail and body of the pancreas), and men are even more likely to have an underlying cancer of the gastrointestinal tract. Gynecological cancers account for about 1 in 4 cases (primarily ovarian cancer and also uterine cancer). Nodules will also, rarely, originate from appendix cancer spillage and pseudomyxoma peritonei. Unknown primary tumors and rarely, urinary or respiratory tract malignancies can cause umbilical metastases. How exactly the metastases reach the umbilicus remains largely unknown. Proposed mechanisms for the spread of cancer cells to the umbilicus include direct transperitoneal spread, via the lymphatics which run alongside the obliterated umbilical vein, hematogenous spread, or via remnant structures such as the falciform ligament, median umbilical ligament, or a remnant of the vitelline duct. Sister Mary Joseph nodule is associated with multiple peritoneal metastases and a poor prognosis.

== History ==
Sister Mary Joseph Dempsey (born Julia Dempsey) was a Catholic nun and surgical assistant of William J. Mayo at St. Mary's Hospital in Rochester, Minnesota, from 1890 to 1915. She drew Mayo's attention to the phenomenon, and he published an article about it in 1928. The eponymous term Sister Mary Joseph nodule was coined in 1949 by Hamilton Bailey.
