= The Laryngospasms =

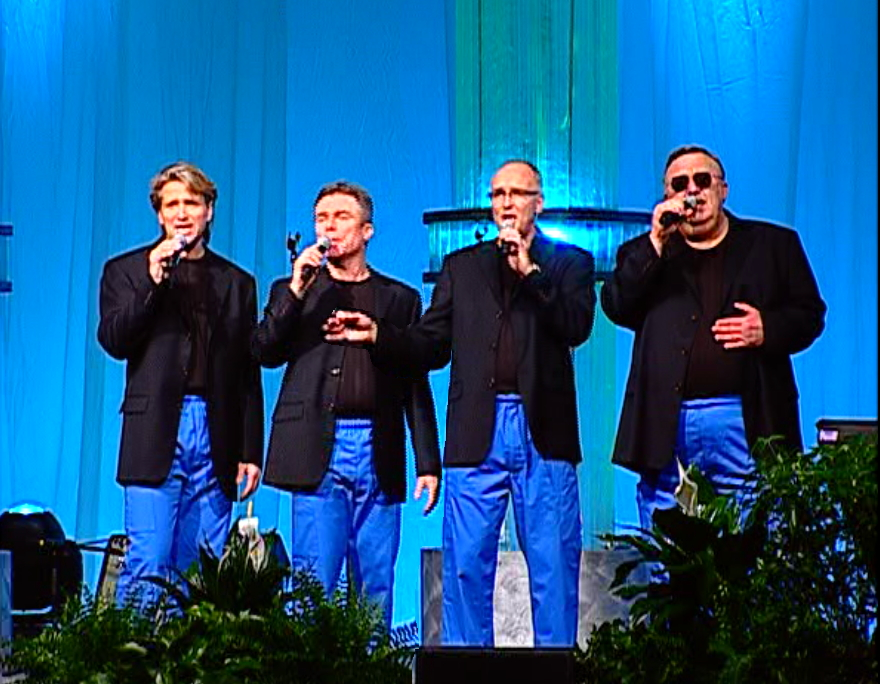
The Laryngospasms

The Laryngospasms are an American medical parody group composed of four Certified Registered Nurse Anesthetists (CRNAs). The group performs regularly for a variety of medical conferences and charity groups throughout the United States and Canada.

== History ==
The group can be traced back to a 1990 Christmas party for students of the Minneapolis School of Anesthesia. A few of the then-students were singing various songs, one of them being Neil Sedaka's Breaking Up Is Hard To Do. When a senior student suggested that the song be sung as "Waking Up Is Hard To Do", the group was formed. The group's first performance was for the graduation ceremonies of the 1991 class of the Minneapolis School of Anesthesia. This first performance was witnessed by several officers of the Minnesota Association of Nurse Anesthetists. These officers approached the group and ask them to perform at the American Association of Nurse Anesthetists' National Conference, to be held in Nashville, Tennessee, late in the summer of 1991. This was the group's first national performance.

== Music and biography ==
The group continues to be based in the Twin Cities Metropolitan area of Minneapolis & St. Paul, MN. Their music consists of medical parodies of an increasingly broad scope. Initially, the group's music was created to please its chief audience of nurse anesthetists, and was focused exclusively on operating room humor, and, very often, anesthesia-specific topics. The range of medical topics covered has broadened accordingly. The group has released two albums, and is currently working on a third.

== Current members ==
- Gary Cozine, CRNA, MS is the last remaining original member of the group.
- Doug Meuwissen, CRNA joined the group in 1992.
- Rich Leyh, CRNA, MS joined the group in 1998.
- Keith Larson, CRNA, MS joined the group in 1999.

== Past members ==
Over its 20-year history, the group has had 15 members. All members of the group have been Certified Registered Nurse Anesthetists (CRNAs):

- Todd Adams, CRNA, MS
- Rod Coyour, CRNA, MS
- Lee Harris, CRNA, MS
- George Hoffman, CRNA, MS
- Mike Landgraff, CRNA, MS
- Mike Polivka, CRNA, MS
- Bruce Thorpe, CRNA, MS
- Dave Voth, CRNA, MS
- Don Walter, CRNA, MS
- Todd Walter, CRNA, MS
- Dave Kimball, CRNA, MS

== Discography ==
- 1994 – The Laryngospasms With The Stylettes
- 2002 – Paradise
