= Certified registered nurse anesthetist =

Professional title for nurse anesthetists in the United States

CRNA
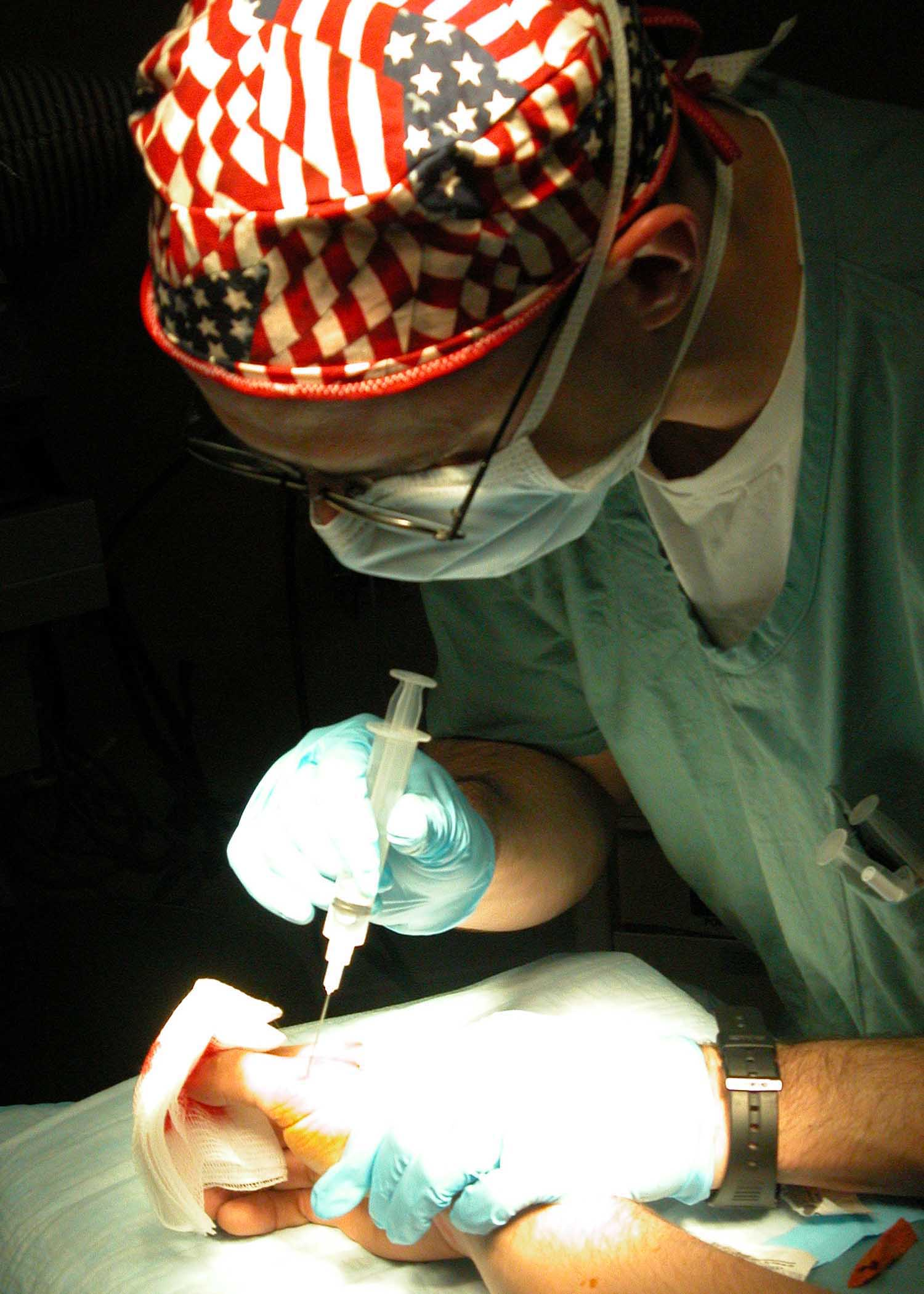
- A nurse anesthetist administers a local anesthetic.

Occupation
- Activity sectors: Anesthesia, Nursing

Description
- Education required: Doctor of Nursing Practice
- Fields of employment: Hospital; Outpatient Surgery Centers; Ambulatory Surgery Centers

A certified registered nurse anesthetist (CRNA) is a type of advanced practice nurse who administers anesthesia in the United States. CRNAs account for approximately half of the anesthesia providers in the United States and are the main providers (80%) of anesthesia in rural America. Nurses have provided anesthesia care to patients for over 160 years, dating back to the American Civil War (1861–1865). The CRNA credential was formally established in 1956. As of 2025, CRNA schools issue a doctor of nursing anesthesia practice (DNAP) or doctor of nursing practice (DNP) degree to nurses who have completed a three-year program.

Scope of practice and practitioner oversight requirements vary between healthcare facility and state, with 27 states and Guam granting complete autonomy as of 2026. In states that have opted out of supervision, the Joint Commission and CMS recognize CRNAs as licensed independent practitioners. In states requiring supervision, CRNAs have liability separate from supervising practitioners and are able to administer anesthesia independently of physicians, such as anesthesiologists.

== History ==
=== American Civil War and the 19th century ===
Among the first American nurses to provide anesthetics was Catherine S. Lawrence during the American Civil War. It was during the Second Battle of Bull Run in 1863 that she administered chloroform to wounded soldiers who needed emergency operations in the battlefield. Nevertheless, it still took several years for nurses to step forward and formally answer the call to provide anesthesia. Reasons for this delay included lack of training, the non-emergency nature of civilian surgical practice after the war was over, and the paucity of role models and sponsors. However, the wartime concept of nurses providing anesthesia care gradually took root as surgeons trained and encouraged nurses to take on this important role.

Catholic nuns played an important role in the training of nurses and also in anesthesia. The earliest recorded nurse to specialize in anesthesia was Sister Mary Bernard Sheridan, a Catholic nun who practiced in 1877 at St. Vincent's Hospital in Erie, Pennsylvania. Her influence spread throughout the Midwest, and many other Catholic nuns who were also nurses began training to administer anesthesia. Nuns of the Third Order of the Hospital Sisters of St Francis from Münster established a community in Springfield, Illinois, and on June 22, 1879, they founded St John's Hospital. At St John's, the administration of chloroform and ether was taught to the nurses by surgeons, and many of the Franciscan Sisters were assigned as anesthetists throughout the Midwest. Nurse anesthesia became “undoubtedly a prevailing practice in many Catholic hospitals”.

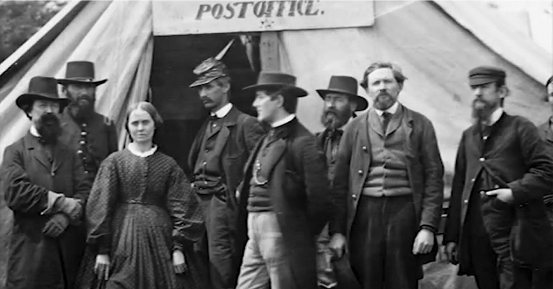
Catherine Lawrence (1820-1904) in a photograph taken during the American Civil War

In 1883, Minnesota was devastated by a tornado. Mother Alfred Moes and the Sisters of Saint Francis proposed building a hospital to aid the sick and injured in Southern Minnesota. However, they stipulated that William Worrall Mayo (1819-1911) and his sons work at the hospital. The Mayos agreed, and in 1889, St Mary's Hospital opened with 27 beds. Although Catholic nuns seemed to be the most influential force in teaching nurses to administer anesthesia in the late 1800s, it was William W. Mayo who should be credited for promoting the popularity of nurse anesthesia practice. Mayo and his sons William J. Mayo and Charles H. Mayo were well known for their surgical skills. Surgeons traveled from across the country to their clinic in Minnesota to observe operations and learn their surgical techniques. However, the visiting surgeons also took note of the nurses administering anesthesia at the head of the operating table.

One of the most well-known nurse anesthesia pioneers was Alice Magaw, who came to St Mary's Hospital in Rochester, Minnesota, in 1893. She was trained by the Graham sisters, Edith and Dinah, and began working as a nurse anesthetist for Charles H. Mayo, who bestowed on her the title of “Mother of Anesthesia” due to her natural aptitude and mastery of safe administration of open-drop ether. In addition to being skilled at anesthesia administration, Magaw documented and evaluated all her anesthesia procedures, culminating with a landmark article in nurse-anesthesia history. An even larger work (A Review of Over Fourteen Thousand Surgical Anesthesias) was published in 1906, reporting huge number of open-drop ether anesthetics, incredibly without a single fatality. Magaw's work highlighted the benefits of the trained anesthetist, allowing great advances in the practice of medicine. As the reputation and success of the Mayo Clinic spread, so did the renown of the Mayo Clinic nurse anesthetists.

The sustainability and historical longevity of the practice of nurse anesthesia can be attributed to excellent working relationships between nurse anesthetists and surgeons in these early years of the practice. Impressed by the provision of superior anesthesia by nurses at St Mary's, and following the example of the Mayo Clinic, prominent Cleveland surgeon George Washington Crile recruited Agatha Cobourg Hodgins as his personal anesthetist in 1908.

=== 20th century and initial challenges ===
Several notable nurse anesthetist from the early 20th century are revered by their modern counterparts. Agnes McGee taught at the Oregon Health Science Center. Alice Hunt was appointed instructor in anesthesia with university rank at the Yale University School of Medicine beginning in 1922 and continuing for 26 years. She authored the 1949 book Anesthesia, Principles and Practice, likely the first nurse anesthesia textbook.

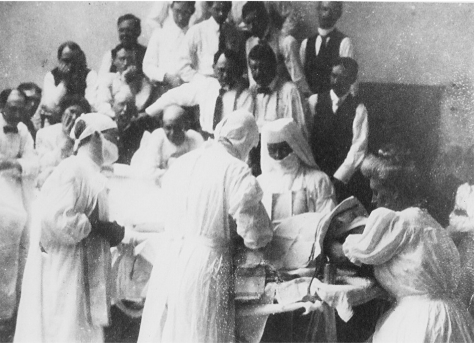
Alice Magaw (bottom right) administering anesthesia during a surgery at the Mayo Clinic.

The first challenge to the nurse's right to administer anesthesia came in 1911 from Francis Hoeffer McMechan, a native Cincinnati physician, who felt that the field of anesthesia should belong solely to physicians. McMechen challenged the practice of nurse anesthesia with the Ohio Medical Board, which along with Ohio State Attorney General ruled in 1916 that only a registered physician could administer anesthesia. Surgeons at the Lakeside Hospital in Cleveland, such as Crile, initially obeyed the ruling; however, in 1917, Crile and his supporters successfully lobbied the Ohio legislature to create an exemption within the Medical Practice Act for nurses who were educated appropriately to administer anesthesia under the supervision of a physician.

Perhaps the most noteworthy challenge occurred in 1934, when nurse anesthetist Dagmar Nelson was charged by an anesthesiologist, William VaneChalmer-Francis, with practicing medicine and violating California Medical Practice by administering anesthesia without a license. The case went all the way to the California Supreme court, but Nelson was given a favorable ruling at each level of the case. The Dagmar Nelson case was won via precedents set by early nurse anesthetists. The California Supreme Court reasoned that Nelson's practice of anesthesia was in “accordance with the uniform practice in operating rooms” not only in Los Angeles but also throughout the country including the Mayo Clinic, where Nelson had trained and “where...one hundred thousand surgical operations had been performed” with anesthetic administered by nurses.

Despite the rapid growth of the nurse anesthetist profession following the Great War, World War II again precipitated a shortage of anesthetists. A recruitment campaign was begun, but this was quickly followed by concern about the emergence of “ill advised and unjustified schools”. Helen Lamb in turn stressed the importance of maintaining educational standards even in times of shortages. By the end of WWII, the military had trained more than 2000 nurses to provide anesthesia using a program patterned by the NANA. The quality of nurse anesthesia education was again upgraded following WWII, and although university affiliation was advised, most programs were still hospital based. In 1933, the NANA established an Education Committee to develop educational standards, and by 1952, formal accreditation standards were in place.

=== Legal cases ===
Under U.S. law, Frank v. South, Chalmers-Francis v. Nelson and other court decisions established that anesthesia was the practice of nursing as well as medicine. As such, the practice of anesthesia in the US may be delivered by either a nurse anesthetist or an anesthesiologist. The decisions have not been challenged since the Dagmar Nelson case. In addition to legal decisions, individual hospital and surgical facility policies also regulate the granting of anesthesia clinical privileges and are often based on contractual agreements with provider groups.

== Education ==
=== History ===
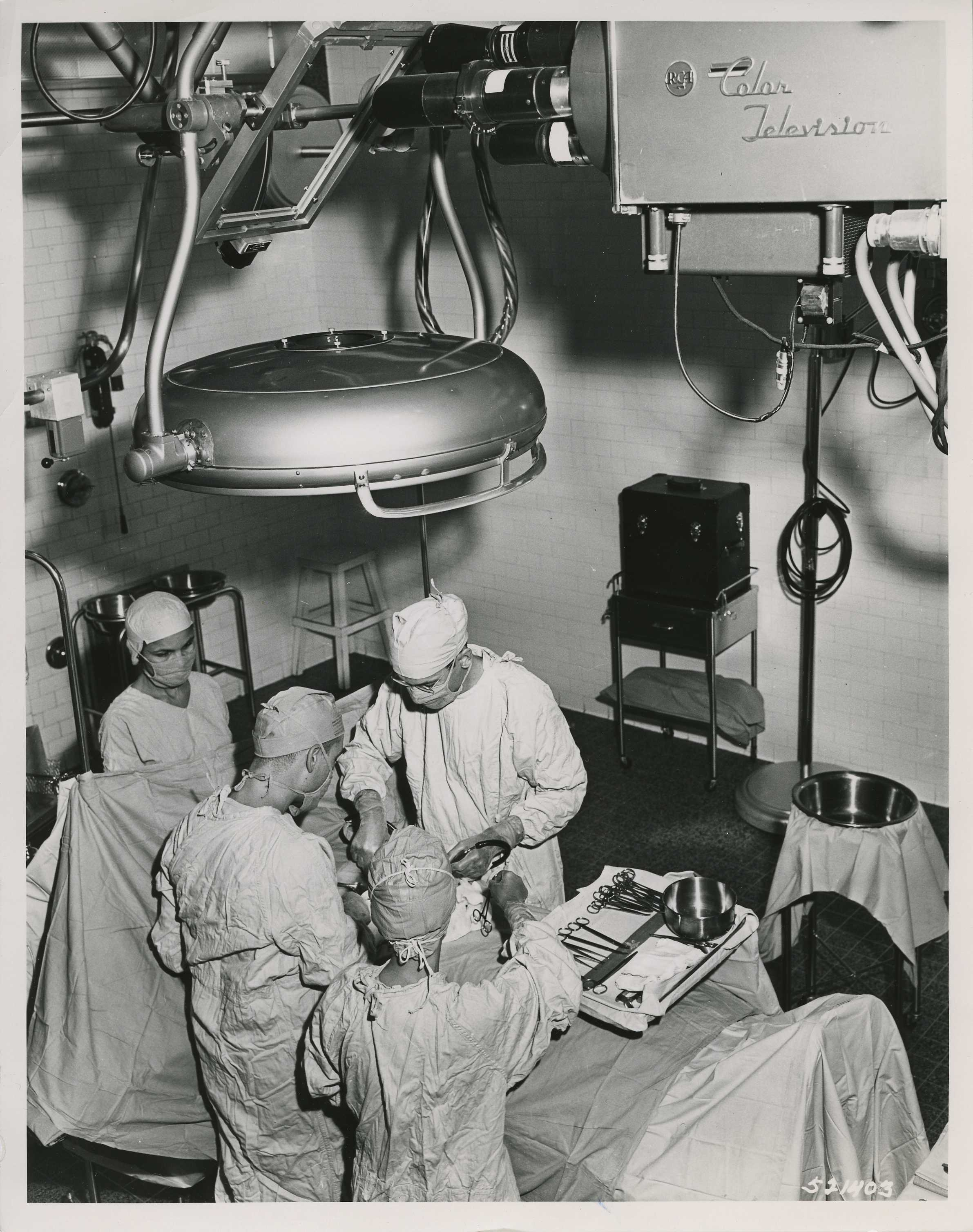
A nurse anesthetist administering anesthesia at Walter Reed Hospital in 1957

The first school of nurse anesthesia was formed in 1909 at St. Vincent Hospital, Portland, Oregon. Established by Agnes McGee, the course was seven months long, and included courses on anatomy and physiology, pharmacology, and administration of the few common anesthetic agents available at the time. Within the next decade, approximately 19 schools opened. All consisted of post-graduate anesthesia training for nurses and were about six months in length. These included programs at Mayo Clinic, Johns Hopkins Hospital, Barnes Hospital, New York Post-Graduate Hospital, Charity Hospital in New Orleans, Grace Hospital in Detroit, among others. During those early days of administering anesthetics, knowledge and available anesthetic options were extremely limited and programs provided what little education they could for all levels of health providers. For example, in 1915, chief nurse anesthetist Agatha Hodgins established the Lakeside Hospital School of Anesthesia in Cleveland, Ohio. This program was open to nurses, physicians, and dentists. The training was only six months and the tuition was $50. In its first year, it graduated six physicians, eleven nurses, and two dentists.

Among the oldest schools in the U.S., Ravenswood Hospital in Chicago, opened in 1925 by Mae Cameron, which in 2001 became the NorthShore University HealthSystem School of Nurse Anesthesia, was the first school to be accredited by the Council on Accreditation of Nurse Anesthesia Educational Programs in 1952.

In 1981, the Nursing Council on Accreditation developed guidelines for master's degrees. In 1982, it was the official position of the AANA board of directors that registered nurses applying for a school of anesthesia shall be, at minimum, baccalaureate prepared and then complete a master's level anesthesia program. As early as 1978, the Kaiser Permanente California State University program had evolved to a master's level program. All programs were required to transition to a master's degree beginning in 1990 and complete the process by 1998. Currently, the American Association of Colleges of Nursing has endorsed a position statement that will move the current entry level of training and education of nurse anesthetists in the United States to the Doctor of Nursing Practice (DNP) or Doctor of Nurse Anesthesia Practice (DNAP). This move will affect all advance practice nurses, with a mandatory implementation by the year 2015. In August 2007, the AANA announced its support of this advanced clinical degree as an entry level for practice of all nurse anesthetists, with a target compliance date of 2025. In accordance with traditional grandfathering rules, all those in current practice would not be affected and neither would the training provided to those now receiving the DNP or DNAP designation. Currently, more than 50% of the 120 nurse anesthesia programs have already transitioned to the DNP or DNAP entry level format.

=== Requirements ===
The didactic curricula of nurse-anesthesia programs is governed by the COA standards. Accredited programs provide supervised experiences for students with patients of all ages who require medical, surgical, obstetrical, dental, and pediatric interventions. Programs require study in methods of scientific inquiry and statistics, as well as active participation in a student-generated and faculty-sponsored research project.

Before becoming a nurse anesthetist, one must complete a few years of a bachelor's-level registered nursing. A minimum of one year of full-time work experience as a registered nurse in a critical care setting is required before applying to CRNA school. The average experience of RNs entering nurse anesthesia educational programs is 2.9 years. Nurse anesthetists are required to attend accredited educations programs covering all areas of anesthesia. This education provides training about the anesthetics needed for patients in any type of procedure or surgery. After completing an accredited program, CRNAs must pass a national certification exam to acquire this designation. It is important to have the best education for this field for the significance of anesthesia. By 2025 the Council on Accreditation, the organization which accredits nurse anesthetist programs, will require all graduating CRNAs to be doctorate prepared.

== Armed forces ==
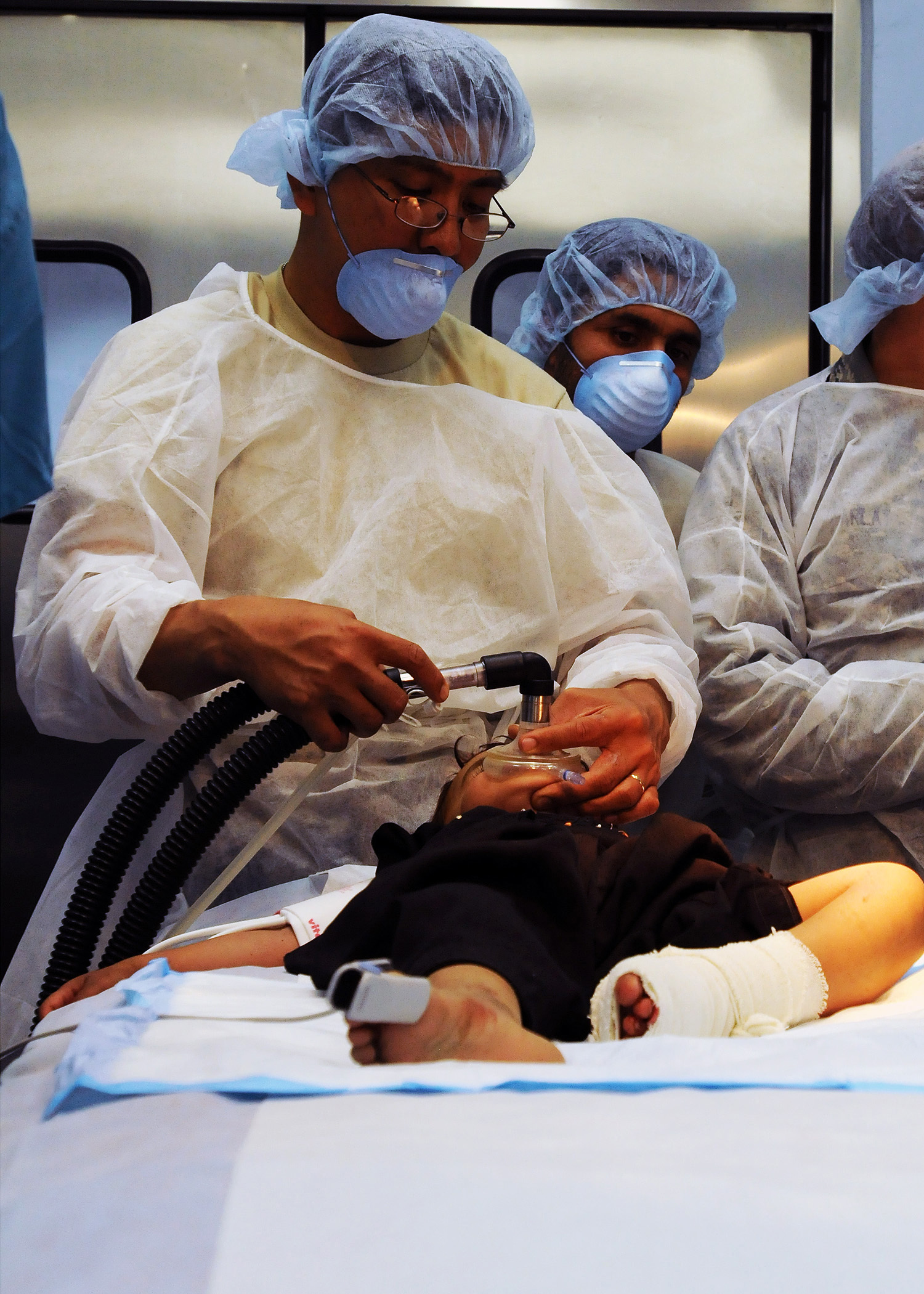
A CRNA administers anesthesia to an Afghan child during the War in Afghanistan.

Nurse anesthetists serve in the United States armed forces. In some military treatment facilities, nurse anesthetists function as the only licensed independent anesthesia practitioners, including U.S. Navy ships at sea. They also provide anesthesia for the Veterans Administration and Public Health Service medical facilities.

During World War I, America's nurse anesthetists cared for troops in France. From 1914 to 1915, three years prior to America entering the war, Dr. George Crile and nurse anesthetists Agatha Hodgins and Mabel Littleton served in the Lakeside Unit at the American Ambulance at Neuilly-sur-Seine in France. In addition, they helped train the French and British nurses and physicians in anesthesia care. In 1917, the American participation in the war resulted in the U.S. military training nurse anesthetists for service. The Army and Navy sent nurses anesthesia trainees to various hospitals, including the Mayo Clinic at Rochester and the Lakeside Hospital in Cleveland before overseas service.

Among notable nurse anesthetists are Sophie Gran Winton. She served with the Red Cross at an army hospital in Château-Thierry, France, and earned the French Croix de Guerre in addition to other service awards. In addition, Anne Penland was the first nurse anesthetist to serve on the British Front and was decorated by the British government.

American nurse anesthetists also served in World War II and Korea. Second Lieutenant Mildred Irene Clark provided anesthesia for casualties from the Japanese attack on Pearl Harbor. During the Vietnam War, nurse anesthetists served as both CRNAs and flight nurses, and also developed new field equipment. Nurse anesthetists have been casualties of war. Lieutenants Kenneth R. Shoemaker Jr. and Jerome E. Olmsted, were killed in an air evac mission en route to Qui Nhon, Vietnam.

At least one nurse anesthetist was a prisoner of war. Army Nurse anesthetist Annie Mealer endured a three-year imprisonment by the Japanese in the Philippines, and was released in 1945. During the Iraq War, nurse anesthetists provide care at forward positioned medical treatment facilities. In addition, they play a role in the continuing education and training of Department of Defense nurses and technicians in the care of wartime trauma patients.

== Certification ==
Board certification and recertification process is governed by the National Board on Certification and Recertification of Nurse Anesthetists (NBCRNA). The NBCRNA exists as an autonomous not-for-profit incorporated organization. CRNAs also have continuing education requirements and recertification check-ins every two years thereafter, plus any additional requirements of the state in which they practice. The recertification pathway focuses on: maintenance of certification, lifelong learning, and continued competence. Starting in August 2024, CRNAs began transitioning from the Continued Professional Certification (CPC) Program, which consisted of 8-year periods, and each period comprised two four-year cycles, to the Maintaining Anesthesia Certification (MAC) program. The new recertification program has three components: MAC Ed (Class A credits), MAC Dev (Class B credits), and MAC Check (quarterly knowledge checks)

== Scope of practice ==
The degree of independence or supervision by a licensed provider (physician, dentist, or podiatrist) varies with state law. Some states use the term collaboration to define a relationship where the supervising physician and the CRNA work together to provide the anesthetic. Other states require the consent or order of a physician or other qualified licensed provider to administer the anesthetic.

The licensed CRNA is legally authorized to deliver care under the particular Nurse Practice Act of each state. Scope of CRNA practice is commonly further defined by the practice location's clinical privilege and credentialing process, anesthesia department policies, or practitioner agreements. Clinical privileges are based on the scope and complexity of the expected clinical practice, CRNA qualifications, and CRNA experience. This allows the CRNA to provide core services and activities under defined conditions with or without supervision.

In 2001, the Centers for Medicare and Medicaid Services (CMS) published a rule in the Federal Register that allows a state to be exempt from Medicare's physician supervision requirement for nurse anesthetists after appropriate approval by the state. To date, 22 states and Guam have opted out of the federal requirement, instituting their own individual requirements instead.

== Salary ==
According to the U.S. Bureau of Labor Statistics, a CRNA salary is around $225,555. Salaries within the US vary by state. Connecticut is the highest-paying state for CRNAs at an average salary of $276,540. It is followed by New Jersey ($263,850), Illinois ($250,280), and West Virginia ($247,650). Overall employment for nurse anesthetists and other medical professions is projected to grow 45 percent from 2020 to 2030.

== Duties ==
CRNAs typically work in healthcare settings such as emergency rooms, intensive care units, and operating rooms. Their environment is with medical and surgical teams with procedures that can occur anytime. Some partnerships they work with are dentists, surgeons, podiatrists and other healthcare providers in serving patients who need of receiving anesthesia. Nurse anesthetists are an essential part of everyday medical facilities. The need of CRNAs is anticipated to grow.

=== Skills and procedures ===
Nurse anesthetists practice independently (depending on the state law) or they practice in collaboration with anesthesiologists, surgeons, and doctors to supply anesthetics to patients. CRNAs are responsible for communicating with the surgeon or team about the patient's health history and designing a plan for anesthesia. The procedures that nurse anesthetists offer include:

- Evaluation of the patient prior to anesthesia
- Physical assessment and teaching before the anesthesia
- Administering patients' anesthesia
- Administering regional anesthesia/analgesia such as spinals and epidurals
- Placing ultrasound guided blocks for surgery
- Managing patients in the post-operative period
- Manage the recovery from the anesthesia

=== Roles and responsibilities ===
CRNAs have important roles when it comes to patient care. They need to meet all patient standards and help ensure the patient is in good condition before receiving an anesthesia plan. Some of the skills a CRNA requires include:

- Bedside manner
- Record-keeping skills
- Communication skills
- Teamwork with other nurses and physicians
- Inhaled anesthesia administration
- Ultrasound guided nerve blocks
- Point of care ultrasound
- Administration of blood and medication
- Epidural placement
- Placement of arterial and central lines

Subsequent to the COVID-19 pandemic, there has been an increase in the number of individuals who need respiratory assistance.

== Terminology ==
The AANA recognizes Certified Registered Nurse Anesthetist, CRNA, nurse anesthetist, and nurse anesthesiologist as equivalent titles. The use of nurse anesthetist is substantially more common than the use of nurse anesthesiologist; terms anesthesia nurse and anesthetist nurse are unheard of.

Use of the term nurse anesthesiologist has been criticized by those who argue that the term anesthesiologist should be limited to medical doctors. For example, groups representing anesthesiologists and other medical doctors, such as the American Medical Association (AMA) and American Society of Anesthesiologists (ASA), oppose the use of this phrase to describe CRNAs and call it misleading.

In 2021, after a year-long rebranding effort, the American Association of Nurse Anesthetists changed its name to the American Association of Nurse Anesthesiology. The name change was condemned by physician groups, including the AMA, ASA, American Board of Anesthesiology, American Board of Medical Specialties, and American Osteopathic Association. Physicians' organizations said that the name change was "title misappropriation" that was deceptive, misleading to patients, and could cause confusion in care settings.
