= C16H13N =

The molecular formula C_{16}H_{13}N (molar mass: 219.28 g/mol, exact mass: 219.1048 u) may refer to:

- Benzylisoquinoline
- N-Phenylnaphthalen-1-amine (NPN)
