= Samuel Gelfan =

Samuel Gelfan (16 January 1903, Russian Empire – 16 March 1975, Ossining, New York) was an American professor of neurophysiology. He was a Guggenheim Fellow for the academic year 1932–1933.

== Education and career ==
Gelfan graduated from the University of California at Los Angeles (UCLA) with A.B. in 1925 and Ph.D. in 1927. There he was a teaching fellow in biology from 1925 to 1927. He was from 1928 to 1930 a Donnelly Research Fellow at the University of Chicago and from 1930 to 1932 an assistant professor of physiology and pharmacology at the University of Alberta. For the academic year 1932–1933 he investigated muscle fibre physiology with Edgar D. Adrian at the University of Cambridge.

During the late 1930s Gelfan was a physiologist at the College of Medicine of the University of Illinois at Chicago. At the Columbia University College of Physicians and Surgeons he was an associate professor of physiology before he joined the faculty of the Yale School of Medicine. From 1946 to 1952 he was at Yale, where he became director of the aeromedical unit. There he and his colleagues studied the mammalian response to high‐altitude flight and explosive decompression. He was a professor of neurophysiology in the department of neurology and neurosurgery of the New York Medical College (NYMC) from 1952 to 1973, when he retired. At NYMC he did research on spinal cord physiology with grants from the National Institutes of Health.

Gelfan was the author or co-author of articles published in the American Journal of Physiology, Proceedings of the Society for Experimental Biology and Medicine, Science, and Nature.

== Family ==
Gelfan married Harriet Lucy Moore (1912–2013) on November 29, 1943. She graduated from Bryn Mawr College in 1932 and then studied in the Soviet Union. During the Spanish Civil War she donated a touring car to the Loyalists. During the 1950s she was subpoenaed several times to Washington, D.C. to testify before the Eastland Committee. She was an ardent supporter of civil rights and other leftwing causes well into her nineties. Samuel and Harriet Gelfan had four daughters and two sons. When she died at age 101 she was survived by her six children and six grandchildren.

== Selected publications ==
- Bell, Irving R.; Gelfan, Samuel (January 1933). "The Anesthetic Action of Divinyl Oxide on Humans". Journal of Pharmacology and Experimental Therapeutics. 47 (1): 1–3. (See divinyl ether.)
- Adrian, E. D.; Gelfan, S. (1933). "Rhythmic activity in skeletal muscle fibres". The Journal of Physiology. 78 (3): 271–287. doi:10.1113/jphysiol.1933.sp003002. PMC 1394910. PMID 16994419.
- Gelfan, Samuel (1933). "The submaximal responses of the single muscle fibre". The Journal of Physiology. 80 (3): 285–295. doi:10.1113/jphysiol.1933.sp003089. ISSN 0022-3751. PMC 1394122. PMID 16994501.
- Gelfan, Samuel (1935). "The Effect of Viosterol Upon Oxygen Consumption of Frog's Muscle". American Journal of Physiology. Legacy Content. 113 (2): 464–466. doi:10.1152/ajplegacy.1935.113.2.464.
- Chang, H.-T.; Margaria, R.; Gelfan, S. (1950). "Pressure Changes and Barotrauma Resulting from Decompression and Recompression in the Middle Ear of Monkeys". Archives of Otolaryngology–Head & Neck Surgery. 51 (3): 378–399. doi:10.1001/archotol.1950.00700020400009.
- Gelfan, Samuel; Nims, Leslie F.; Livingston, Robert B. (1950). "Explosive Decompression at High Altitude". American Journal of Physiology. Legacy Content. 162 (1): 37–53. doi:10.1152/ajplegacy.1950.162.1.37. PMID 15432669.
- Gelfan, Samuel; Tarlov, I. M. (1955). "Differential Vulnerability of Spinal Cord Structures to Anoxia". Journal of Neurophysiology. 18 (2): 170–188. doi:10.1152/jn.1955.18.2.170. PMID 14354454.
- Gelfan, Samuel; Tarlov, I. M. (1956). "Physiology of Spinal Cord, Nerve Root and Peripheral Nerve Compression". American Journal of Physiology. Legacy Content. 185 (1): 217–229. doi:10.1152/ajplegacy.1956.185.1.217. PMID 13313775.
- Gelfan, S.; Tarlov, I. M. (1959). "Interneurones and rigidity of spinal origin". The Journal of Physiology. 146 (3): 594–617. doi:10.1113/jphysiol.1959.sp006214. PMC 1357053. PMID 13665681.
- Gelfan, S.; Tarlov, I. M. (1963). "Altered neuron population in L7 segment of dogs with experimental hind-limb rigidity". American Journal of Physiology. Legacy Content. 205 (3): 606–616. doi:10.1152/ajplegacy.1963.205.3.606. PMID 14065918.
- Gelfan, Samuel (1963). "Neurone and Synapse Populations in the Spinal Cord: Indication of Role in Total Integration". Nature. 198 (4876): 162–163. Bibcode:1963Natur.198..162G. doi:10.1038/198162a0. PMID 13947051. S2CID 4154394.
- Gelfan, Samuel; Rapisarda, A. F. (1964). "Synaptic density on spinal neurons of normal dogs and dogs with experimental hind-limb rigidity". The Journal of Comparative Neurology. 123: 73–95. doi:10.1002/cne.901230108. PMID 14199270. S2CID 37788855.
- Gelfan, S. (1964). "Neuronal Interdependence". Organization of the Spinal Cord. Progress in Brain Research. Vol. 11. pp. 238–260. doi:10.1016/S0079-6123(08)64051-0. ISBN 9780444533197. PMID 14300481.
- Gelfan, S. (1966). "Altered spinal motoneurons in dogs with experimental hind-lamb rigidity". Journal of Neurophysiology. 29 (4): 583–611. doi:10.1152/jn.1966.29.4.583. PMID 5966426.
- Gelfan, Samuel; Carter, Sylvester (1967). "Muscle sense in man". Experimental Neurology. 18 (4): 469–473. doi:10.1016/0014-4886(67)90064-7. PMID 6036943.
- Gelfan, Samuel; Kao, Grace; Ruchkin, Daniel S. (1970). "The dendritic tree of spinal neurons". The Journal of Comparative Neurology. 139 (4): 385–411. doi:10.1002/cne.901390402. PMID 4195698. S2CID 2638630.
