= Louis B. Wilson =

Louis Blanchard Wilson
- Born: December 22, 1866
- Died: October 5, 1943 (aged 76)
- Education: University of Minnesota
- Occupation: Pathologist
- Employer: Mayo Clinic
- Spouse: Maud Mellish-Wilson

Louis Blanchard Wilson (December 22, 1866 – October 5, 1943) was an American pathologist and the chief of pathology at Mayo Clinic from 1905 to 1937. Wilson is most famous for initiating the routine use of the frozen section procedure for rapid intraoperative diagnosis.

== Biography ==
Wilson received his medical degree from the University of Minnesota in 1896. After this, Wilson was the assistant director of the bacteriology laboratory at the Minnesota State Board of Health and an assistant professor of pathology and bacteriology at the University of Minnesota and lived in Minneapolis.

Dr. Henry Plummer urged the Mayo brothers to hire a well-trained pathologist to develop the laboratories at Mayo Clinic and Dr. Wilson reluctantly agreed to move to Rochester, Minnesota for this position. On January 1, 1905, Wilson began working at Mayo Clinic as the chief of pathology and he initiated a new scientific way of doing things at St. Marys Hospital.

Wilson systematized the processing of surgical and autopsy specimens and increased the number of autopsies performed at the hospital. Wilson began using a frozen section technique he created in 1905 and published a paper on his method in JAMA at the end of that year. His technique proved lasting and has had a major impact in modern medicine. He also initiated animal experimentation during those early years. In 1918, Wilson went overseas as the assistant director of the AEF division of laboratories and infectious diseases.

Wilson and his chief, Col. Joseph F. Siler, greatly increased the number of laboratories in use. This exposed thousands of doctors to the use of laboratories in medicine and they returned home to demand laboratories in their hospitals. In the 1920s, Wilson married Maud Mellish (editor of Mayo Clinic's publications) and together they wrote the Sketch of the History of the Mayo Clinic and the Mayo Foundation anonymously in 1926.

Wilson retired from the Mayo Clinic in 1937. Dr. Wilson's home where he lived with his second wife Maud Mellish, Walnut Hill (architect Harold Crawford), is extant on the grounds of the Assisi Heights convent in Rochester, Minnesota and owned by the Mayo Clinic.

== See also ==
- Louis B. Wilson House
- Maud Mellish-Wilson
