= Florence Church Bullard =

American nurse

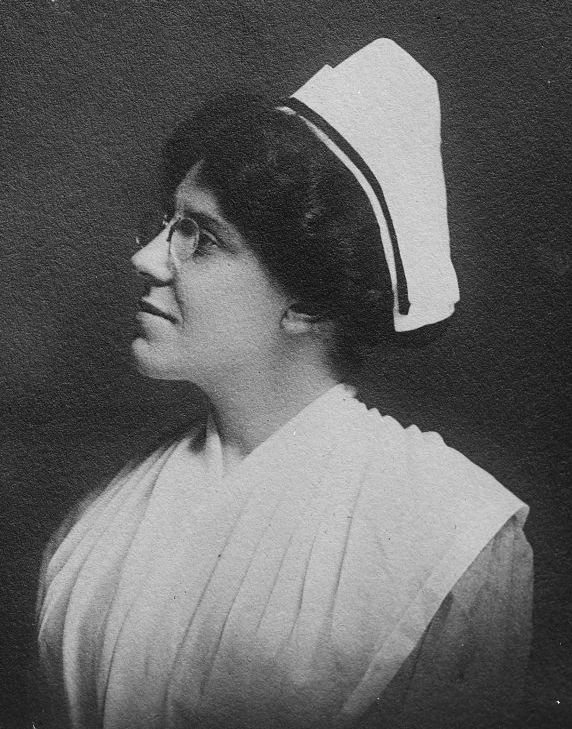
- Born: 1880; AuSable, New York, U.S.
- Died: 1967 (aged 86–87)
- Occupation: Nurse
- Awards: Croix de Guerre with bronze star

Florence Church Bullard (1880–1967) was an American nurse and recipient of the French Croix de Guerre with a bronze star. Trained at St. Mary's Hospital Nursing School in Rochester, Minnesota (later part of the Mayo Clinic), she served with the American Red Cross in the American Volunteer Motor Ambulance Corps.

== Life ==
She was born in January 1880 in New Sweden in AuSable, New York. After a career as a school teacher in Glens Falls, New York, she switched her profession to nursing. Bullard graduated in 1913 from St. Mary's Hospital Nursing School, run by the Sisters of Saint Francis of Rochester, Minnesota in Rochester, Minnesota, later part of the Mayo Clinic. She initially pursued a career in the private health care sector.

== World War I ==
In 1916, she joined the American Red Cross as part of the American Volunteer Motor Ambulance Corps assigned to Evacuation Hospital 13 in Neuilly-sur-Seine, France.

Although World War I had erupted in 1914, the United States did not engage militarily in the conflict until April 6, 1917. The ambulance corps was partnered with the British Red Cross to transport wounded Allied soldiers from the battlefield to hospitals in France. When the nursing services at the hospital ceased at the end of the war, Bullard was given the flag that had flown over the hospital. For her service during the conflict, the nation of France awarded her the Croix de Guerre with a bronze star, along with a citation that noted she stood firm in her responsibilities even when the enemy's bombings came dangerously close to the hospital. In September 1918, she became the first American woman to be so honored by France.

"She has shown imperturbable sangfroid (Note: The Merriam Webster dictionary defines "sangfroid" as "evenness of mind under stress") under the most violent bombardments during March and May. Despite her danger, she searched for and comforted and assisted the wounded. Her attitude was especially brilliant on July 31, when bombs burst near.”

— The citation accompanying the Croix de Guerre medal.

== Post war ==
Following the end of the war, she once again became a private nurse, and at one point was named the nursing superintendent at Nettie Bowne Hospital in Poughkeepsie, New York. In its May 1920 issue, The Scribner’s Magazine published “Soissons”, a poem penned by Hardwicke Nevin and dedicated to Bullard. She and 23 other experienced nurses were recruited to join the "Red Cross Chautauqua Program" to tour the United States promoting good health through sanitation and in-home care. By the end of her nursing career, Bullard was assistant superintendent at Poughkeepsie's Bowne Memorial Hospital in Dutchess County, New York.

Throughout her life, Bullard had kept close ties to the Sisters of Saint Marys, believing that her nursing career was but a testimony to their good works. As her health declined in later life, and her eyesight began to fade, Bullard turned her Croix de Guerre and the accompanying citation over to the sisters in 1961, with the comment, “they are not mine at all—but that surely they were presented to me in recognition of the Sisters of Saint Marys and their wonderful work in creating and carrying on the School of Nursing." (Note: The Saint Marys School of Nursing closed in 1970, after producing 3,865 graduates.)

== See also ==
- Mayo Clinic Hospital
- Women of Mayo Clinic

== Bibliography ==
- Wright-Peterson, Virginia (2016). Women of Mayo Clinic: the Founding Generation. Minnesota Historical Society. ISBN 978-1-68134-001-2. OCLC 942710568.
