= Winifred Ashby =

British-born American pathologist

Dr. Winifred Ashby
- Born: October 13, 1879; London
- Died: July 19, 1975 (aged 95); Vancouver, British Columbia
- Education: Northwestern University; University of Chicago (B.S.); Washington University in St. Louis (M.S.); University of Minnesota (Ph.D.)
- Known for: Contributions to hematology, “Ashby method”
- Scientific career
- Workplaces: Rush Medical College; Illinois Central Hospital; Mayo Clinic; St. Elizabeth's Hospital

Winifred Mayer Ashby (October 13, 1879 – July 19, 1975) was a British-born American pathologist known for developing the Ashby technique for determining red blood cell survival.

== Biography ==
Ashby was born to George Mayer Ashby and Mary-Ann Brock in London, UK, in 1879, and emigrated with her family to the United States at the age of 14. She attended several universities, including Northwestern University and University of Chicago receiving a B.S degree from the latter in 1903 and she received a M.S. degree from Washington University in St. Louis in 1905. She studied malnutrition among children in the Philippines. Upon returning to the United States, she taught physics and chemistry in the high schools of Berwyn, Ill. and Maryville, Mo. From 1914 to 1916 she worked in laboratories at Rush Medical College and Illinois Central Hospital in Chicago. She then took up a Fellowship at the Mayo Clinic in Immunology and pathology in February 1917, where she stayed a staff member until 1924. Her fellowship extended the length of seven years, during which she made historic contributions to hematology. In 1921, Ashby also received her PhD from the University of Minnesota, and affiliate of the Mayo Clinic, and one of the first women to receive a PhD diploma. She later became a staff member of St. Elizabeth's Hospital in Washington, DC where she did work in bacteriology. Her final study was a hypothesis on sudden infant death syndrome, which was cut short by her death in 1975.

During her life, it was widely believed that the life span of the erythrocyte (red blood cell) was no more than two to three weeks. She undertook a study of erythrocyte survival and devised a serologic technique for accurately measuring erythrocyte survival. She concluded that human red cells may remain in the circulation for as long as 110 days. Results of erythrocyte survival studies with the “Ashby method” remain a milestone in the development of the knowledge of erythrocyte physiology.

Her work on red blood cell survival rates was first published in 1919, which included the theories of the Ashby Technique. She never returned to Rochester, and for 47 years there was almost no communication. At St. Elizabeth's Hospital, she supervised serology and bacteriology laboratories until her retirement in 1949. During those 28 years, she published several studies concerning the standardization and relative sensitivity of serologic tests for syphilis. She also contributed many studies of the carbonic anhydrase activity of the central nervous system.

== See also ==
- Women of Mayo Clinic
