= Tarlov cyst =

Cerebrospinal fluid lesion in the spinal canal

Tarlov Cyst
- Other names: Perineural Cyst; Nerve Root Cyst; Perineural Root Sleeve Cyst; Nerve Sheath Cyst; Sacral Cyst
- MRI image showing a Tarlov cyst
- Specialty: Neurosurgery, neurology, gynecology
- Symptoms: Sacral Pain, Groin Pain Leg Weakness, Leg Heaviness, Stiffness, Tightness, Feet Pain, Bladder Dysfunction, Bowel Dysfunction, Persistent Genital Arousal Disorder
- Usual onset: Most commonly in the 4th and 5th decade of life (30-49)
- Diagnostic method: MRI
- Frequency: ~ 4.18%
- Named after: Dr. Isadore Tarlov

Tarlov cysts, also known as perineural cysts, are cerebrospinal fluid (CSF)-filled lesions that most commonly develop in the sacral region of the spinal canal (S1–S5), and less frequently in the cervical, thoracic, or lumbar spine. These cysts form as dilations of the nerve root sheath near the dorsal root ganglion, specifically within the perineural space between the endoneurium and perineurium. A defining feature is that the cyst walls contain nerve fibers, which often line the inner cavity of the cyst itself. This involvement of neural elements distinguishes Tarlov cysts from other extradural meningeal cysts, such as meningeal diverticula, which do not contain nerve fibers.

The etiology of these cysts is not well understood; some current theories explaining this phenomenon include increased spinal fluid pressure, filling of congenital cysts with one-way valves, and/or inflammation in response to trauma and disease. They are named after an American neurosurgeon Isadore Tarlov, who described them in 1938.

These cysts are often detected during MRI or CT scans. They are also observed using magnetic resonance neurography with communicating subarachnoid cysts of the spinal meninges. Cysts with diameters of 1cm or larger are more likely to be symptomatic; although cysts of any size may be symptomatic dependent on location and etiology. Some 40% of patients with symptomatic Tarlov cysts can associate a history of trauma or childbirth. Current treatment options include CSF aspiration, Aspiration and Fibrin Glue Injection (AFGI), laminectomy with wrapping of the cyst, among other surgical treatment approaches. Interventional treatment of Tarlov cysts is the only means by which symptoms might permanently be resolved due to the fact that the cysts often refill after aspiration. Tarlov cysts often enlarge over time, especially if the sac has a check valve type opening. They are differentiated from other meningeal and arachnoid cysts because they are innervated and diagnosis can in cases be demonstrated with subarachnoid communication.

Tarlov perineural cysts have occasionally been observed in patients with connective tissue disorders such as Marfan syndrome, Ehlers–Danlos syndrome, and Loeys–Dietz syndrome.

== History ==
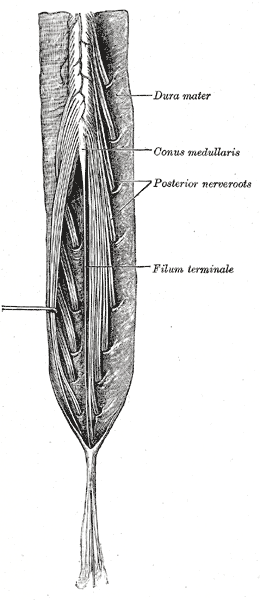
Cauda equina nerve roots and filum terminale

Perineural cysts were first described by Dr. Isadore Tarlov in 1938. While conducting anatomical dissections of 30 human cadavers to study the filum terminale and lower spinal nerve roots, Tarlov identified cystic lesions on the S2 to S5 sacral nerve roots in five specimens, ranging in size from a pinhead to approximately 2 cm. He also reported degenerative changes in the nerve fibers, ganglion cells, and disintegration of myelin sheaths. These observations were published in a paper titled "Perineurial Cysts of the Spinal Nerve Roots (1938)", in which he suggested the possible clinical relevance of the cysts, stating:

"One wonders whether they may not be responsible for the discomfort in certain cases of sciatica or nerve root pains, in which any other pathologic basis has been excluded. This awaits further studies with clinical and pathologic correlations."

In 1948, Tarlov reported the first clinical case linking sacral perineural cysts to sciatic pain, establishing their potential as a treatable cause of radiculopathy. He described a 42-year-old woman who developed persistent right-sided sciatica following a fall. Although a herniated intervertebral disc was initially diagnosed, surgical exploration revealed a perineural cyst arising from the right S2 sacral nerve root, located under the posterior arch of the sacrum. The lesion was excised along with part of the dorsal root and ganglion. Postoperatively, the patient experienced significant improvement in motor function, pain, and sensation, without complications. Tarlov concluded that such cysts, though often overlooked during standard imaging or surgery, could produce clinically significant symptoms and should be considered in cases of unexplained sciatic pain. He published these findings in the paper "Cysts (Perineurial) of the Sacral Roots: Another Cause (Removable) of Sciatic Pain" (1948).

In 1952, Tarlov published his third paper on perineurial cysts, titled "Cysts of the Sacral Nerve Roots: Clinical Significance and Pathogenesis". In this work, he acknowledged the limitations of his earlier cadaver studies due to incomplete medical records, noting that the symptomatic relevance of the cysts was initially unclear. The paper presented detailed accounts of two surgical cases from 1950 and 1951 in which sacral nerve root cysts were associated with neurological symptoms. The first patient, a 28-year-old man with progressive numbness, urinary incontinence, and sexual dysfunction, was found to have bilateral S2 cysts; surgical removal of the right cyst and drainage of the left halted symptom progression and improved bladder function. The second case involved a 70-year-old woman with paresthesia in the right leg and vaginal area, foot weakness, and sacral tenderness, in whom four cysts were discovered on the S2 and S3 nerve roots. Partial excision led to improvement in foot strength and partial symptom relief. Tarlov also discussed two post-mortem cases in which subarachnoid hemorrhages and sacral cysts coexisted, prompting the hypothesis that the cysts might occasionally form secondary to hemorrhagic damage to nerve roots. He concluded that perineurial cysts should be considered in patients with gradually worsening sacral nerve symptoms when imaging or surgery fails to reveal a herniated disc.

In 1953, Dr. Isadore Tarlov published a monograph titled Sacral Nerve-Root Cysts: Another Cause of the Sciatic or Cauda Equina Syndrome, which compiled his anatomical, histological, and clinical research on perineurial cysts. The book combined scientific analysis with case studies to illustrate the symptoms, surgical techniques, and outcomes associated with sacral cysts. In Chapter 8, titled "Clinical Significance", Tarlov presented ten patient case reports documented between 1948 and 1952, four of which involved surgeries he personally performed. The remaining cases were managed by other surgeons using various techniques. Reported symptoms included pain, paresthesia, numbness (e.g., of the penis, thigh, buttocks, rectum, or vagina), urinary incontinence, and foot weakness with absent ankle reflex. Complete surgical removal of isolated cysts often led to full recovery, while patients with multiple cysts saw more limited improvement due to conservative surgical approaches. He concluded the monograph by urging increased clinical awareness of these lesions, stating that perineurial cysts may be a surgically treatable cause of sciatic and sacrococcygeal syndromes.

In his 1970 paper "Spinal Perineurial and Meningeal Cysts", Tarlov described the clinical features, diagnosis, and classification of spinal perineurial cysts, and distinguished them from other spinal cysts such as meningeal diverticula and intradural arachnoid cysts, which had often been conflated in earlier literature. He emphasized the importance of distinguishing these lesions to avoid unnecessary surgical interventions and diagnostic errors. Tarlov reported that perineurial cysts contained nerve root fibers and typically did not fill with contrast dye (Pantopaque) during initial myelography, although delayed filling may have been evident days or weeks later due to limited communication with the subarachnoid space. In contrast, meningeal diverticula do not contain nerve fibers, have free communication with the subarachnoid space, and usually fill immediately with contrast dye during myelography.

== Signs and symptoms ==
=== Appearance ===
Walls of Tarlov cysts are thin and fibrous; they are prone to rupture if touched, making surgery difficult. The nerve fibers embedded in the walls of the cysts have the appearance and size of dental floss; these nerve fibers are usually not arranged in any specific alignment. Histologic examination reveals the Tarlov-cyst outer wall is composed of vascular connective tissue, and the inner wall is lined with flattened arachnoid tissue. In addition, part of the lining containing nerve fibers also occasionally contains ganglion cells. The cysts can contain anywhere from a couple of milliliters of CSF to over 2.5 litres (0.5 imp gal; 0.7 US gal) of CSF.

=== Location ===
Tarlov cysts are most commonly located in the S1 to S4/S5 region of the spinal canal, but can be found along any region of the spine. Tarlov cysts typically form on the extradural portions of the sacral nerve roots, most often near the dorsal root ganglion of the dorsal (sensory) nerve roots. They arise within the perineural space, between the endoneurium and perineurium. Occasionally, these cysts are observed in the lumbar and thoracic spine. The cysts are often multiple, extending around the circumference of the nerve, and can enlarge over time to compress neighboring nerve roots, to cause bone erosion.

The cysts may also form on the anterior (front) side of the sacrum and have been known to extend into the pelvic cavity. These cysts, though rare, can be found to grow large - over 3–4 centimetres (1.2–1.6 in) in size, often causing severe pelvic pain from compression on the cyst itself as well as adjoining nerves.

=== Tarlov Cyst Symptoms ===
Reported Tarlov Cyst Symptoms According To The Involved Nerve Roots
Nerve Supply	Symptoms
S2, S3, S4 Sensory: Perineum, clitoris, penis, vagina, scrotum Autonomic: Detrusor muscle of the bladder, descending colon, transverse colon, internal urinary sphincter, internal anal sphincter Motor: External Urinary sphincter, external anal sphincter	Pelvic Pain; Perineal pain & paresthesia; Vaginal pain; dyspareunia; Testicular or penile pain; prostate pain; Pelvic instability symptoms; Neurogenic bladder symptoms: urine retention, hesitation, valsalva voiding, urinary frequency, urgency, painful bladder, urge incontinence, stress incontinence.; Neurogenic bowel symptoms: constipation, alternating with diarrhea; intestinal cramps; defecation frequency; urgency;bloating;false defecation urge, fecal incontinence; stabbing pain; pressure or cramps in anal sphincter; Erectile dysfunction; retrograde ejaculation; Female anorgasmia; persistent genital arousal disorder
S2 Sensory: Perineum, posteromedial side of the legs, plantar region of the feet Motor: Intrinsic foot muscles	Pain, cramps, and paresthesia in the feet atrophy of the intrinsic foot muscles due to compression of nerve root S2
L5 and S1 Sensory: Posterior side of the legs (S1), lateral side of the leg, first and firth toe (L5), dorsal side of the feet Motor: Gluteus maximus muscle and calf muscles (S1), gluteus medius muscle and extensor muscles of the feet and toes (L5)	Lumbar and sacral pain; Pain in the piriformis muscle and trochanter region; Pain and/or paresthesia in the legs and feet; Leg cramps; Leg weakness; Neurogenic claudication: pain while walking, a significantly slower walking pace than before onset, increased pain when walking uphill; Weakness of dorsiflexion of the feet; rarely foot drop (L5); Weakness of plantar flexion of the feet (S1)
L1 to L4	Paresthesia and pain in the legs; Weakness of knee or hip extension
Thoracic nerve roots	Paresthesia and pain in the upper back; Intercostal neuralgia
Cervical nerve roots	Cervical pain and pain in the trapezius muscles; Pain and paresthesia in the arms and hands
Brain	Headaches

=== Symptoms ===
- Pain
- Paresthesia
- Spasticity, Hypertonia
- Muscular Dysfunction or Weakness
- Radiculopathy

Although Tarlov Cysts can develop anywhere along the spine, they are most commonly symptomatic in the sacrum. Women are more likely to exhibit symptoms. They can also appear in clusters or bilaterally along the spine, thus symptoms can be unilateral, bilateral, or with symptoms more dominant on one side. The cases of reported symptomatic Tarlov cysts ranges from 15% to 30% of the overall reported Tarlov cyst cases, depending on the source of literature. Nevertheless, these cysts are important clinical entities because of their tendency to increase in size over time, potentially causing complications and eroding the surrounding bone tissue.

=== Common symptoms specific to Sacral Tarlov cysts ===
Below is a list of commonly reported symptoms associated with sacral Tarlov cysts.

- Pain:
  - Sacral, coccygeal (tailbone), gluteal, groin, rectum, and perineal regions
  - Sciatica and leg pain
  - Foot and toe pain
  - Persistent genital arousal disorder (PGAD) or pudendal neuralgia
  - Neuropathic pain characterized by burning (dysesthesia), aching, or stabbing sensations
- Sensory Disturbances:
  - Paresthesias such as tingling, electric shocks, buzzing or internal vibrations
  - Fasciculations (muscle twitching)
  - Numbness or other sensory deficits
- Motor Dysfunction:
  - Muscle weakness (Paresis) in the legs and feet
  - Toe cramping and muscle spasms
  - Foot Drop (Rarely)
- Bladder, Bowel, Sexual Dysfunction:
  - Neurogenic bladder: urinary retention, hesitation, Valsalva voiding, increased frequency and urgency, painful bladder, urge incontinence, and stress incontinence.
  - Neurogenic bowel: constipation, diarrhea, cramping, urgency, changes in defecation frequency, false urge to defecate, fecal incontinence, anal sphincter pain or pressure.
  - Erectile dysfunction; retrograde ejaculation
- Positional Aggravation:
  - Symptoms are typically worsened by standing, walking, sitting, or bending
  - Lying down (recumbency) may provide partial or temporary symptom relief

== Cause ==
=== Formation ===
There are several hypotheses proposed regarding the formation of Tarlov cysts, including: hemorrhagic infiltration of spinal tissue, inflammation within the nerve root cysts followed by inoculation of fluids, developmental or congenital origin, arachnoidal proliferation along and around the exiting sacral nerve root, and breakage of venous drainage in the perineuria and epineurium secondary to hemosiderin deposition after trauma. Tarlov himself theorized that the perineural cysts form as a result of blockage of venous drainage in the perineurium and epineurium secondary to hemosiderin deposition, after local trauma. Another theory gaining increasing popularity, over the past decade, is one postulated by Fortuna et al.; it described perineural cysts to be the results of congenital arachnoidal proliferation along the exiting sacral nerve roots. Some research on the migration of inflammatory cell into spinal has been studied. Additionally, in vivo and in vitro studies show inflammation induced by CNS injury causes distinct cystic cavitations created by astrocyte migration.

=== Hemorrhagic Infiltration ===
Many authors state that blood and its breakdown products acting as foreign-body substance in the subarachnoid space produce local adhesive arachnoiditis with no symptoms, but it also can create cystic degeneration. The subarachnoid space abhors all foreign body substances. Even the presence of injected air is considered to be a "foreign body". Blood definitely is considered a foreign body, particularly in its breakdown products. Repeated exposure to foreign body substances in the subarachnoid space or spinal injury can initiate auto-immune amnestic reactions which may potentiate and magnify the ongoing inflammatory process causing cystic cavitation in spinal tissue.

=== Enlargement ===
Tarlov cysts are known to have the tendency to enlarge over time. The prominent theory that explains this phenomenon reasons the enlargement of the cysts is due to the cerebrospinal fluid being pushed into the cyst during systole pulsation, but unable to get out during the diastole phase, resulting in enlargement observed in clinical settings over time. Increased ICP from trauma or other injury, childbirth, and overexertion are thought to trigger enlargement along with inflammation and hemorrhagic infiltration. With the cysts often containing a valve like mechanism fluid becomes trapped, and the meningeal sac or nerve sheath grows in size. Some patients have been diagnosed for up to 20 years with little change in size, and those with small stable cysts may avoid much progression of symptoms. Those with generally larger sacral cysts pressed along the sacrum cause the sacrum to become eroded and thin.

=== Rupture ===
When Tarlov cysts are ruptured or drained they cause leakage of cerebrospinal fluid (CSF). Ruptures of Tarlov cysts have been reported associated with communicating aneurysms and from fracture in the proximity of the cysts. An undetected rupture can cause intracranial hypotension, including orthostatic neurological symptoms along with headache, nausea, and vomiting that improve when supine. The ruptured cysts can be patched either with a biosynthetic dural patch or using a blood patch to stem the flow of CSF.

== Diagnosis ==
=== MRI ===
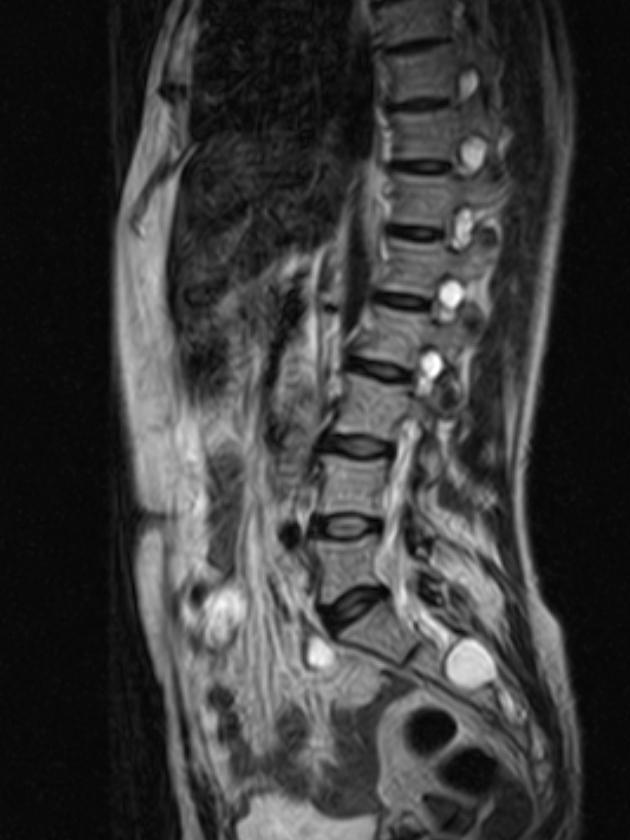
MRI sagittal image of sacral and dorso-lumbar perineural cysts

MRI, or Magnetic Resonance Imaging, is considered the imaging study of choice in identifying Tarlov cysts. MRI provides better resolution of tissue density, absence of bone interference, multiplanar capabilities, and is noninvasive. Plain films may show bony erosion of the spinal canal or of the sacral foramina. On MRI pictures, the signal is the same as the CSF one.

If MRI made with a contrast medium:

- The signal in the cyst is the same as in the dural bag.
- The signal for cysts due to traumas is a little stronger at the periphery or nerve root location.
- The signal is more important for other causes: synovial cysts, dermoïdes or épidermoïdes cysts, teratomes.

=== CT ===
A computed tomography (CT) scan is another examination method often used for the diagnosis of Tarlov cyst. Unenhanced CT scans may show sacral erosion, asymmetric epidural fat distribution, and cystic masses that have the same density with CSF. CT Myelogram is minimally invasive, and could be employed when MRI cannot be performed on patient.

=== Diagnostic Nerve Root Block ===
A highly targeted Diagnostic Nerve Root Block (DNRB) using local anesthetic (eg, 1 cc of 0.25% bupivacaine) can be used as a diagnostic test to determine if a Tarlov cyst is symptomatic.

=== Underdiagnosis ===
Despite increasing clinical documentation, symptomatic Tarlov cysts remain frequently underdiagnosed. This has been attributed to persistent misconceptions in clinical practice and the common perception that these cysts represent incidental findings. Radiologists often omit documenting them on MRI reports or describe them as clinically insignificant, which may contribute to delayed or missed diagnoses. Smaller cysts, in particular, are more likely to be overlooked.

=== Classification ===
Tarlov cysts are considered Type II lesions, being defined as extradural meningeal cysts with nerve fibers. Nabors et al. classify Arachnoïd cysts into three types:

- Type I : Extra-dural; no nerve roots or rootlets such as intra-sacral meningoceles; probably of congenital origin developing from the dural sac to which they are connected by a little collar. They are found at the point of exit of a dorsal nerve root from the dural sac. They are sometimes difficult to identify and can be "seen" as a type II cyst on imaging. These cysts are often associated with foramina enlargement and scalloping of the vertebrae. It is very important to distinguish them from sacral meningoceles going to the pelvic area; they are often associated with other congenital abnormalities (teratomes, dermoïdes, lipomas, and other abnormalities(uro-genital and ano-rectal))
- Type II: Extra-dural; nerve root present (such as Tarlov or perineural cysts). There are often not only one but multiple cysts, mostly found in the sacrum area. There are two types: Tarlov (perineural) cysts are located posteriorly to the root ganglion, with nerve fibres inside or nerve tissue in the walls; they are not communicating with the perineural arachnoid space. Type-II cysts are very small in the upper sacral area, but can be bigger (up to 3 centimetres or 1.2 inches) if found located in the lower part of the sacrum. The second variant of type-II cysts are called "meningeal diverticula". They are located anteriorly to the nerve root ganglion, with nerves fibres inside and communicating with the subarachnoid space.
- Type III: intra-dural; these are either congenital or caused by trauma; they are rarely associated with other abnormalities and rare in occurrence. About 75% can be found in the dorsal area. Most of the congenital type-III cysts can be found posteriorly to the spinal cord, as opposed to those caused by trauma which can be found anteriorly to the spinal cord.
  Post traumatic inflammation induces cavitation and cystic formation and leads to greater secondary CNS injury. Cellular migration causing these cyst cavities was observed both in vitro and in vivo and cavitation was observed to be prevented with the use of an anti-inflammatory. Further more migration inflammatory cells into traumatized tissue has been observed with inflammation.

== Treatment ==
Because of the unclear pathogenesis and pathophysiology of Tarlov cysts, there is no consensus on the optimal treatment of symptomatic sacral perineural cysts. Patients often choose to pursue treatment when the progression of neurological deficits seriously impacts their quality of life. Since cysts are innervated, micro fenestration and surgical sleeving of the cysts to diminish the amount of accumulated cerebrospinal fluid and decrease compression of the spine and spinal nerves has been successful in a number of patients. The cysts are carefully separated enough from surrounding tissue to be wrapped with fatty tissue or pericardial biomaterial to excise the fluid from the cyst. If the cyst does not drain spontaneously, then it is drained and patched using a biosynthetic dural patch. The use of this technique is done in the U.S. and is spreading in Europe but recovery is generally extensive. Micro fenestration alone has been done with some success in Asia. A biopolymer plate is also being used experimentally to strengthen a sacrum thinned by cystic erosion. The risks of CSF leakage are higher on patients that have bilateral cysts on the same spinal level or clusters of cysts along multiple vertebrae, but immediate recognition of the leakage and repair can mitigate that risk.

Various treatment methods have been tried in the past, including the extraction of cerebrospinal fluids from the cyst, fibrin glue injection and the complete or partial removal of cyst. Epidurals can provide temporary relief but are not generally recommended as they can cause cysts to enlarge. Extraction of fluid can provide limited or no relief depending on rate the cysts refill and the need to repeat the procedure. Removal of the cyst results in irreversible damage to the intersecting spinal nerve. Although fibrin-glue therapy initially had been thought to be a promising therapy in the treatment of these cysts, there have been multiple problems associated with the fibrin glue therapy including seepage of fibrin. It is no longer recommended for use at present by the Health Department in some countries and neurosurgeons previously performing the procedures. Nevertheless, all types of surgical treatment pose common risks, including neurological deficits, infection and inflammation, spinal headache, urinary disturbances, and leakage of cerebrospinal fluids.
