= Maud Mellish-Wilson =

- Born: Annie Maud Headline; February 14, 1862; Faribault, Minnesota, USA
- Died: November 6, 1933 (aged 71); Rochester, Minnesota, USA
- Resting place: Oakwood Cemetery, Rochester, MN
- Education: Illinois Training School for Nurses
- Employer: Mayo Clinic
- Spouse: Ernest J. Mellish (m. 1889-1905) Louis B. Wilson (m. 1924)

Maud Mellish-Wilson (February 14, 1862 - November 6, 1933) was a pioneer in medical communication who set up Mayo Clinic's first library, started The Collected Papers of Mayo Clinic which is now Mayo Clinic Proceedings, and was considered by the Mayo brothers to be one of the founders of Mayo Clinic.

== Early life and education ==
Mellish-Wilson was born Annie Maud Headline. She was the youngest of seven children to be born to Peter and Sarah Moses Headline, Swedish immigrants, and she lived in a log cabin near Faribault. Her parents had emigrated from Sweden in 1851, and moved from Chicago to St. Charles, Illinois and then Faribault following a cholera outbreak in 1855.

She wanted to be a doctor, but women were not allowed in medical school at the time and she could not afford it. She attended the Illinois Training School for Nurses in Chicago where she audited lectures at Rush Medical School. At Rush, she became close with the prominent doctors Moses Gunn at Rush and Charles Parkes at Augustana Hospital.

After graduating in 1887, Mellish-Wilson worked for the Maurice Porter Memorial Hospital for Children, eventually becoming superintendent. She married Dr. Ernest J. Mellish, a young surgeon at Rush, in 1889. Ernest had tuberculosis and struggled with his health throughout his life. They moved to Ishpeming, Michigan where they worked in partnership as a surgeon and surgical assistant. During this time, Mellish-Wilson dropped her first name, Annie, and went as Maud.

The couple returned to Chicago in 1893, in the midst of a depressed economy. Ernest began working at charity hospitals and teaching at Rush. Maud began editing his articles around this time. Ernest's illness reoccurred in 1901 and they moved to El Paso, Texas for the arid environment. He died on April 23, 1905, of tuberculosis.

== Mayo Clinic ==
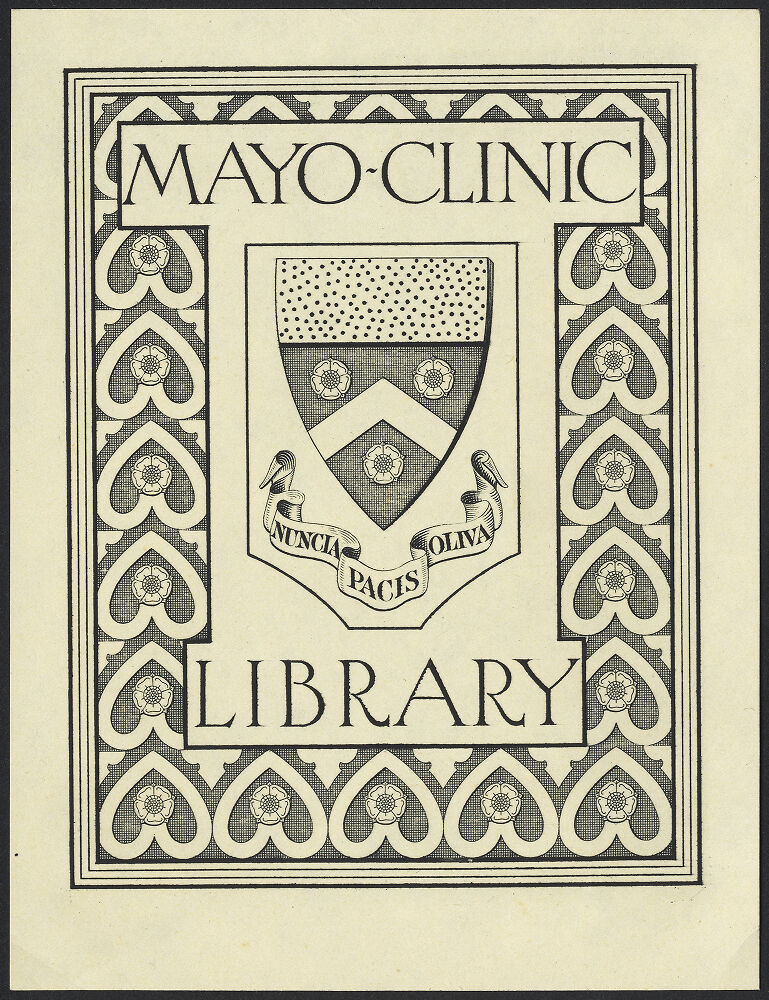
Image of the coat of arms and the Mayo Clinic Library

After Ernest's death, Mellish-Wilson returned to Chicago and began to work organizing the library at Augustana Hospital. Albert Ochsner, the chief surgeon, hired Maud to edit his manuscripts for his writing. Mayo Clinic, founded in 1889, was looking for someone to organize and develop a library and "run the literary end of the business." William Mayo asked Ochsner if he knew anyone, and Ochsner recommended Mellish-Wilson. In 1907, at age 45, Mellish-Wilson joined the clinic. She was part of Mayo's largest growth to that date, as one of nine new people hired.

When she arrived, the library was small, with some publications stored in a basement coal bin. She collected books and articles from around the Clinic, ordered missing volumes, and began to organize the library. Following World War I, the Clinic added books to its collection from European libraries. She also visited medical libraries around the country. Within a few years, the Clinic's library holdings numbered around 4,000. By the time of her death, there were more than 40,000.

While at Mayo, she met Louis B. Wilson who was the Chief of Pathology at the Clinic. They worked together to design the new library for the 1914 expansion of the Clinic. After Wilson's first wife died in 1920, he and Mellish-Wilson married in 1924.

Mellish-Wilson also became the first professional editor at Mayo Clinic, where she helped authors prepare their manuscripts for publication. She was the head of the editorial office and the head of the Division of Publications, along with the library. She hired photographers and medical illustrators, and designed a clinic-wide system for tracking papers through the publication process.

A copy of Mellish-Wilson's book.

In 1909, Mellish-Wilson published the Collected Papers by the Staff of St. Mary’s Hospital Mayo Clinic, which consisted of the most important papers written by Clinic authors since 1905. It was the first of a series which became The Collected Papers of Mayo Clinic, which increased the professional visibility of the Clinic. She edited and published at least one volume a year until her death, representing more than 6,000 articles. In 1922, she used her experience to publish The Writing of Medical Papers to provide guidance on grammar, style, preparing scientific articles, journal abbreviations, and publication practices. She was the architect of what is now known as "the Mayo Style". Her work improved the reputation of Mayo Clinic's written works.

In 1919, Mellish-Wilson and her division began to prepare daily summaries of in-house meetings for the large Clinic staff called The Clinic Bulletin. This became the Proceedings of the Staff Meetings of the Mayo Clinic in 1927, and became Mayo Clinic Proceedings in 1964.

Mellish-Wilson was made an honorary member of Mayo Clinic faculty in the late 1920s.

Mellish-Wilson died on November 6, 1933, following a battle with stomach cancer. On the day of her funeral, the Clinic was closed in her honor. William Mayo honored her in an obituary, writing "Endowed with exceptional ability, untiring perseverance, sound judgment, and indomitable courage, she dedicated her life to the literary development of The Mayo Clinic and The Mayo Foundation."

A 30-minute documentary was made on Melllish-Wilson's life. A Rochester painter, Mike King, created a painting based on one of the few photos of Mellish-Wilson to hang in the Clinic's staff library.

== See also ==
- Women of Mayo Clinic
- Louis B. Wilson and the Louis B. Wilson house
- Mayo Clinic Proceedings
