= Chauncey D. Leake =

American pharmacologist, medical historian and ethicist

Chauncey Depew Leake
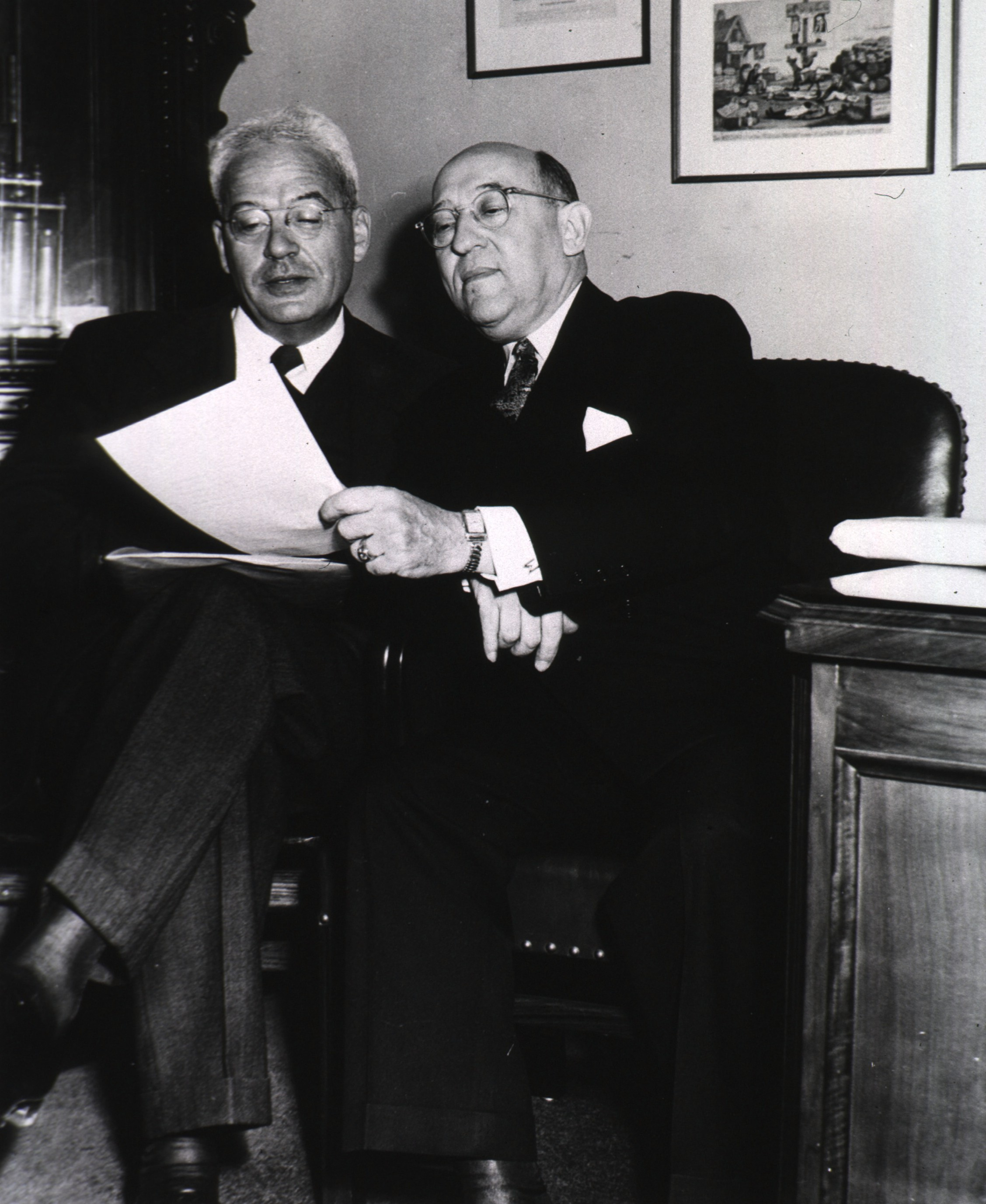
- Leake (left) with Morris Fishbein
- Born: Chauncey Depew Leake; September 5, 1896; Elizabeth, New Jersey, U.S.
- Died: January 11, 1978 (aged 81); San Francisco, California, U.S.
- Scientific career
- Fields: Pharmacology

Chauncey Depew Leake (September 5, 1896 – January 11, 1978) was an American pharmacologist, medical historian and ethicist.

== Early life ==
Leake was born in Elizabeth, New Jersey. At age 10, he was treated by the ophthalmologist Karl Koller. At that time, Koller also introduced Leake to the anesthetic effects of cocaine.

== Education ==
Leake received a bachelor's degree with majors in biology, chemistry, and philosophy from Princeton University. He received his M.S. (1920) and Ph.D. (1923) from the University of Wisconsin in pharmacology and physiology.

== Career ==
Leake discovered the anesthetic divinyl ether. He authored over 400 publications. One of his publications was a translation of the 1628 physiological work De motu cordis (On the Motion of the Heart) from Latin to English.

Leake became a fulltime university administrator from 1942, first at the University of Texas Medical Branch at Galveston and from 1962 at Ohio State University.

In 1973, Leake was one of the signers of the Humanist Manifesto II.

He was awarded the UCSF medal in 1975.

A collection of his papers is held at the National Library of Medicine in Bethesda, Maryland.

== Personal life ==
Leake married the microbiologist Elisabeth Wilson in 1921, and they collaborated for many years. They had two sons and remained married until her death in 1977.

== Literature ==
- Robinson, Victor: Victory Over Pain: A History of Anaesthesia (1947).
