= Mary Alfred Moes =

Luxembourgian-American Roman Catholic nun (1828–1899)

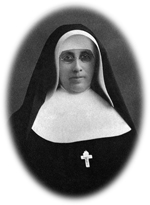
Mary Alfred Moes

Mary Alfred Moes (born Maria Katherine Moes; October 28, 1828 – December 18, 1899) was a Roman Catholic nun who was instrumental in establishing first the Sisters of St. Francis of Mary Immaculate in Joliet, Illinois, as well as the Sisters of Saint Francis of Rochester, Minnesota. She was also the founder of St. Mary's Hospital, Rochester, Minnesota, which became part of the famed Mayo Clinic. Moes had been given a vision from God of a great hospital rising out of the cornfields around Rochester–the little country town, with its one doctor. To that hospital, she had been told in her vision, would come patients from every part of the world and from every nation. And she had seen the name ‘Mayo’ respected the world over for surgical achievements.

== Early life ==
Moes was born in Remich, Luxembourg, the daughter of a prosperous ironsmith. She emigrated to America with her sister, Catherine, due to the preaching of Bishop John Henni of Milwaukee. Bishop Henni spoke of the need for teachers in the United States, especially among the Native Americans. There were also large immigrant communities, mostly German-speaking, establishing themselves there. Both were highly educated in music and arts. Besides their own Luxembourgish language, they spoke and studied in French, German and English. They had also studied mathematics and architecture. The Moes sisters left a life of comfort and set sail from Le Havre, France on September 27, 1851, destined for New York City. From 1852-1863 they lived first in Wisconsin, with the School Sisters of Notre Dame in Milwaukee. Mary was dismissed for both a 'lack of a religious spirit' and 'want of a calling.' Both sisters then joined the Sisters of the Holy Cross in La Porte, Indiana. While there, the sisters took religious vows and assumed the names of Sister Alfred and Sister Barbara. Sister Alfred was dismissed from the congregation for 'acting impudently' and 'repeated disobedience.' The Moes sisters, with two companions, were received into the Third Order of St. Francis in Illinois, on June 1, 1863.

== Illinois ==
At the invitation of Carl Kuemin, of St. John's Church in Joliet, Illinois, the small group of four sisters moved to that town the following November to begin teaching the local children. Lightning struck the Church of St. John the Baptist there on July 31, 1864, killing one parishioner, a young woman who left behind a family. The distraught widower asked the sisters to care for his children. This unexpected work soon expanded, and the sisters began to take in orphans, as well as boarding school students, and candidates to the community. The sisters soon bought a larger house and established St. Francis Academy.

During the summer of 1865, the Guardian of the Franciscan friars in the United States, Pamfilo da Magliano, summoned Moes to St. Bonaventure Friary, in Allegany County, New York, along with the first postulant to the community, Mary Ann Rosenberger. There he named Moes as Superior General of the new congregation of the "Sisters of St. Francis of Mary Immaculate". At that time he bestowed the Franciscan habit on Rosenberger, who took the name Sister Angela. Until 1880, the order used the constitution drafted for the Franciscan Sisters of Allegany, a congregation da Magliano had previously established.

By 1869, the sisters had built a new St. Francis Academy, teaching girls aged 3–20 and drawing students from across the nation. Pastors around the whole country sought the Sisters to come to their parishes to teach their children, especially in non-English-speaking populations. By 1874, the sisters were teaching throughout five states, as far away as Tennessee.

== Minnesota ==
Moes came to plan an even larger expansion of the academy. Bishop Foley of Chicago opposed this idea and ordered the sisters to replace her with a new superior general. One of her first companions, Sister Alberta, accepted the post temporarily. She then assigned Moes to go to Rochester to build Our Lady of Lourdes School, at the request of the bishop there. Shortly after that school was opened, Bishop Foley of Joliet directed Moes and the Minnesota sisters to separate from the Illinois congregation. Bishop Grace of Minnesota chose to accept her vows. Moes's permanent successor as Superior General then informed the congregation of her expulsion, and offered the sisters ten days to decide if they wished to join Moes in Minnesota. Of the whole congregation, 92 chose to remain in Joliet, while 25 chose to join Moes. This small group became the nucleus of a new congregation, the Sisters of St. Francis of Our Lady of Lourdes.

The sisters began to open a series of successful schools. Following a tornado, which devastated the young city of Rochester in 1883, Moes saw the need for a hospital in the town. She proposed to Dr. William Worrall Mayo that the sisters would operate a hospital for the injured and sick if he and his sons would serve as its physicians. Thus they opened St. Mary's Hospital on September 30, 1889. Today that hospital is a part of the Mayo Clinic.

Moes died in 1899, aged 71.

== See also ==
- Women of Mayo Clinic

== Sources ==
- Kraman, Carlan, O.S.F. Odyssey in Faith: The Story of Mother Alfred Moes. Rochester, MN: Sisters of St. Francis, 1990.
