= Thomas Patrick Roger Foley =

American religious leader

The Right Reverend Thomas P. Foley
- Coadjutor Bishop of Chicago
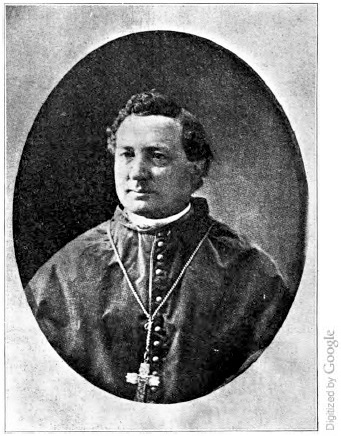
- Church: Roman Catholic Church
- See: Chicago
- In office: November 19, 1869—February 19, 1879

Orders
- Ordination: August 16, 1846
- Consecration: February 27, 1870

Personal details
- Born: March 6, 1822 Baltimore, Maryland
- Died: February 19, 1879 (aged 56) Chicago, Illinois

Thomas Patrick Roger Foley (March 6, 1822 – February 19, 1879) was a bishop of the Roman Catholic Church in the United States. He served as Coadjutor Bishop of Chicago from March 10, 1870, until his death on February 19, 1879.

== Life ==
Born in Baltimore, Maryland, Foley's parents were Irish immigrants. He attended local schools, and at the age of eighteen was graduated from St. Mary's College, Baltimore with a Bachelor of Arts degree. He then attended St. Mary's Seminary and was ordained a priest of the Archdiocese of Baltimore on August 16, 1846. Foley served as pastor at Baltimore Cathedral for 20 years and, in turn, Chancellor, Vicar-General, and Administrator of the Archdiocese of Baltimore.

== Chicago ==
On November 19, 1869, Foley was appointed Coadjutor Bishop and Administrator of Chicago for the incapacitated Bishop James Duggan. On February 27, 1870, Foley was consecrated titular bishop of Pergamum at the Baltimore Cathedral. The principal consecrator was Bishop William G. McCloskey of Louisville. He was installed as coadjutor bishop at St. Mary's Cathedral on March 10.

Foley was in Champaign, Illinois, to administer confirmation when, in October 1871, the diocese lost nearly a million dollars in church property in the Great Chicago Fire. He quickly set about rebuilding. On November 21. 1875, Foley dedicated the new Cathedral of the Holy Name, designed by Patrick Keely.

Bishop Foley invited the Franciscans, Vincentians, Servites, Viatorians, and Resurrectionists to establish parishes and schools. In 1876, disagreements with Mother Mary Alfred Moes of the Sisters of St. Francis of Mary Immaculate of Joliet led to her relocating to Minnesota, where she founded St. Mary's Hospital, which later led to the establishment of the Mayo Clinic.

At his request, the Diocese of Peoria was established in 1877. Also in 1877, Foley named John McMullen as his vicar general. McMullen would manage the diocese as administrator upon Foley's death, and later became the first bishop of the Diocese of Davenport.

After nine years as Bishop and administrator of Chicago, Foley died in office on February 19, 1879 before he could succeed as Bishop of Chicago. Bishop Duggan resigned the following year.
