= Ashby technique =

Method for testing of red blood cells

Visual Model of Ashby Technique.

The Ashby technique is a method for determining the volume and life span of red blood cells in humans, first published by Dr. Winifred Ashby in 1919. The technique involves injection of compatible donor red blood cells of a different blood group into a recipient, followed by blood testing periodically afterwards. Differential agglutination of the red cells is then used to determine the number of remaining donor cells, allowing the survival rate to be determined. It does not involve radioisotope technology, and was the first technique to successfully establish the correct red blood cell life span. In particular, Type O blood is first transfused into Type A or B subjects. In subsequent blood samples, the patient's own A and B blood cells are removed by agglutination with either anti-A or anti-B serum. The number of remaining nonagglutinated Type O cells as a function of time defines the survival rate of blood cells. This technique was used extensively during World War II and shortly after but has more recently been replaced by techniques that label one's own blood, due to the dangers of using donor blood.
