= Isadore Tarlov =

American Neurosurgeon

Isadore Max Tarlov (May 16, 1905 – June 4, 1977) was an American neurosurgeon, academic and researcher. He was the first doctor to provide a methodical description of perineurial cysts of the spinal region, which are now known as Tarlov cysts.

== Biography ==
Tarlov was born in Norwalk, Connecticut, to Russian Jewish immigrant parents. He graduated from Clark University and earned his medical degree from Johns Hopkins University in 1930.

During World War II, Tarlov researched the use of blood plasma clotting agent as an adhesive to repair nerve cells.

Tarlov first noticed the cysts while doing a postmortem examination of 30 filum terminale specimens in 1938, and he published his findings in the Archives of Neurology & Psychiatry. He initially believed the cysts were the result of meningeal diverticula and long arachnoid prolongations. It wasn't until 10 years later that he discovered their significance, and that these cysts can appear symptomatic in patients. An important distinguishing factor is that the walls of Tarlov cysts contain nerve fibers, in contrast to the meningeal diverticula which has no evidence of neural elements.

In 1951, Tarlov joined New York Medical College as a professor of neurology and neurosurgery, and director of the neurology department. The following year he received a grant from the United States Public Health Service to study spinal cord compression. He published a book about his findings in 1957.

== Personal life ==
He married Fredericka (née Bechman), a native of Latvia; they had a son Edward, who is also a neurosurgeon; and two daughters, Ann and Susan. Tarlov died in 1977, aged 72.

== Bibliography ==
- Tarlov, I.M. (1957). Spinal Cord Compression; Mechanism of Paralysis and Treatment. Springfield, Ill.: C.C. Thomas.
- Tarlov, I.M. (1953). Sacral nerve-root cysts; another cause of the sciatic or cauda equina syndrome. Springfield, Ill.: C.C. Thomas.
- Tarlov, I.M. (1950). Plasma clot suture of peripheral nerves and nerve roots; rationale and technique. Springfield, Illinois: C.C. Thomas.
