= Alice Magaw =

American nurse (1860–1928)

- Alice Magaw
- Born: November 9, 1860; Coshocton, Ohio, U.S.
- Died: February 17, 1928 (aged 67); Hudson, Wisconsin, U.S.
- Education: Women’s Hospital School of Nursing in Chicago
- Known for: Anesthesia
- Spouse: George Kessel (m. 1908; sep. 1919)
- Scientific career
- Fields: nursing
- Workplaces: Mayo Clinic

Alice Magaw (November 9, 1860 – February 17, 1928) was an American nurse known for her work on anesthesia. Her innovations helped lead to major advances in modern surgery and earned her the title of the 'mother of anesthesia.'

== Early life and education ==
Alice Magaw was born on November 9, 1860, in Coshocton, Ohio, to Thomas and Nancy Elizabeth Magaw. In 1881, the Magaw family relocated to the Five Corners area of Rochester, Minnesota. Magaw attended the Women's Hospital School of Nursing in Chicago, Illinois, from 1887 to 1889 with her friend Edith Graham and Edith's older sister, Dinah.

Magaw married Dr. George Kessel, a fifty-two-year-old widower with four children, on May 23, 1908. The Kessels lived in Cresco, Iowa. The Kessels separated in 1919.

== Career ==
After graduating from the Women's Hospital School of Nursing in 1889, Magaw worked as a private duty nurse in Chicago. In 1893, Magaw became the anesthetist for Drs. William J. and Charles H. Mayo at St. Mary's Hospital in Rochester, Minn., a position she held until 1908 when she married Dr. George Kessel. Magaw continued her anesthesia career delivering anesthetics to patients at the Kessel Hospital in Cresco, Iowa, but returned to practice at the Mayo in the early 1920s after her separation from Dr. Kessel. Her delivery of fourteen thousand anesthetics without an anesthesia-related death established a record for the safety of the practice of anesthesia by nurses. She incorporated hypnotic anesthesia and the Open Drop method in her work, needing less chemical anesthesia with both techniques which helped reduce the risk of overdose.

== Honors and awards ==
In 1899, Magaw became the first nurse anesthetist to be published when the Northwestern Lancet printed her article “Observations in Anesthesia.” Five more articles would follow. Charles Mayo bestowed upon her the name “Mother of Anesthesia” for her mastery of open drop ether.

The American Association of Nurse Anesthesiology (AANA) established the Alice Magaw Outstanding Clinical Practitioner Award (formally the Clinical Anesthesia Practitioner Award) in 1998 to honor Magaw. This award recognizes the accomplishments of CRNAs involved in direct patient care, who have made an important contribution to the advancement of nurse anesthesia practice.

== Publications ==
- Magaw A. Observations in Anæsthesia, Northwestern Lancet. 1899;19: 207–10.
- Magaw A. Observations on 1092 Cases of Anesthesia from Jan. 1, 1899 to Jan. 1, 1900. The St. Paul Medical Journal. 1900;2: 306–11.
- Magaw A. A Report of 245 Cases of Anesthesia by Nitrous Oxide Gas and Ether. The St. Paul Medical Journal. 1901;3: 231–33.
- Magaw A. Observations Drawn from an Experience of Eleven Thousand Anesthesias. Transactions of the Minnesota State Medical Association. 1904: 91–99.
- Magaw A. A Review of Over Fourteen Thousand Surgical Anæsthesias. Surgery, Gynecology, and Obstetrics. 1906;3(6): 795–99.

== Death ==
Magaw died from complications of diabetes on February 17, 1928. After a funeral in Rochester and a private family funeral in Corunna, Michigan, Magaw was buried in the Pine Tree Cemetery in Corunna, Michigan.

== See also ==
- Women of Mayo Clinic
