= Divinyl ether =

Names
- Preferred IUPAC name (Ethenyloxy)ethene
- Other names divinyl ether, divinyl oxide, ethenoxyethene, vinyl ether

Identifiers
CAS Number	109-93-3
3D model (JSmol)	Interactive image
ChEBI	CHEBI:81293
ChEMBL	ChEMBL2105883
ChemSpider	7733
ECHA InfoCard	100.003.383
EC Number	203-720-5
KEGG	C17721
PubChem CID	8024
UNII	2H2T044E11
UN number	1167
CompTox Dashboard (EPA)	DTXSID5074555
- InChI: InChI=1S/C4H6O/c1-3-5-4-2/h3-4H,1-2H2 Key: QYKIQEUNHZKYBP-UHFFFAOYSA-N
- SMILES: O(\C=C)\C=C

Properties
Chemical formula	O(CH=CH_{2})_{2}
Molar mass	70.091 g·mol^{−1}
Appearance	colorless liquid or gas
Melting point	−101 °C (−150 °F; 172 K)
Boiling point	28.3 °C (82.9 °F; 301.4 K)

Hazards
- Occupational safety and health (OHS/OSH)
Main hazards	flammable
NFPA 704 (fire diamond)	2 4 2
- Except where otherwise noted, data are given for materials in their standard state (at 25 °C [77 °F], 100 kPa). Infobox references

Divinyl ether is the organic compound with the formula O(CH=CH_{2})_{2}. It is a colorless, volatile liquid that has mainly been of interest as an inhalation anesthetic. It is prepared by treating bis(chloroethyl) ether with base.

== History ==
The analytical techniques used to study its pharmacology laid the groundwork for the testing of new anesthetic agents. Vinyl ether was first prepared in 1887 by Semmler from its sulfur substituted analogue, divinyl sulfide (obtained from the essential oil of Allium ursinum L.), by reaction with silver oxide. In 1899, Knorr and Matthes obtained low yields of vinyl ether by exhaustive methylation of morpholine.

Cretcher et al. reported, in 1925, what would become the foundation for one industrial method used to produce vinyl ether. It was stated that the action of heated sodium hydroxide upon β,β`-dichlorodiethyl ether produced a liquid boiling at 39 °C (among other identified products). However, in a subtly modified process Hibbert et al. reported the isolation of a product boiling at 34–35 °C, "divinyl ether". Finally, in 1929, a patent issued to Merck & Co reported isolation of vinyl ether boiling ca. 28 °C. The currently accepted boiling point of vinyl ether is 28.3 °C; the Merck patent, therefore, was the first to report the isolation of a pure product.

Even before its isolation and characterization, the application of an unsaturated ether as an anesthetic interested some pharmacologists. One such pharmacologist, Chauncey Leake, was particularly captivated by the then theoretical vinyl ether. Leake predicted that vinyl ether would combine the properties of two anesthetic agents, ethyl ether, and ethylene.

As an anesthetic ethylene has many favorable properties, although its very low potency often requires hypoxic conditions to achieve full anesthesia. Ethyl ether, on the other hand, is a relatively potent anesthetic but falls short of ethylene in some respects. In comparison to ethyl ether, ethylene has a much lower occurrence of post operative nausea; additionally, ethylene has faster induction and recovery times than ethyl ether.

Solely guided by predictions based upon structure, Leake pursued the usage of vinyl ether as an inhalation anesthetic. As vinyl ether was unknown in its pure form, Leake approached organic chemists at Berkeley asking them to synthesize this novel anesthetic. Leake's colleagues however, were unable to prepare vinyl ether; later though, Leake received help from two Princeton chemists, Randolph Major and W. T. Ruigh. Using samples received from Princeton, in 1930, Leake and fellow researcher Mei-Yu Chen published a brief study characterizing the anesthetic effects of vinyl ether upon mice. In the conclusion of this study, they cordially invited further research of this drug.

This invitation was accepted; in 1933 Samuel Gelfan and Irving Bell of the University of Alberta published the first human trials of vinyl ether. They reported the experience of Gelfan himself as he was anesthetized with vinyl ether via the open drop technique. Although, according to Leake, anesthesiologist Mary Botsford at the University of California was the first to clinically administer vinyl ether for a hysterectomy in early 1932.

Thenceforth, vinyl ether was studied extensively at other institutions, though political climate at Berkeley hindered further study by Leake. Vinyl ether had some success but its usage was limited by concerns of liver toxicity and degradation upon long-term storage.

== Properties ==
Vinyl ether is a rather unstable compound which with exposure to light or acid decomposes to acetaldehyde and polymerizes into a glassy solid. Like many other ethers, vinyl ether is also liable to form peroxides upon exposure to air and light. For these reasons vinyl ether is sold with inhibitors such as polyphenols and amines to quell polymerization and peroxide formation. The anesthetic product was inhibited with .01% phenyl-α-napthylamine which gave it a faint violet fluorescence.

Vinyl ether rapidly decolorizes a solution of bromine in carbon tetrachloride; it is also rapidly oxidized by aqueous potassium permanganate; sulfuric acid reacts with vinyl ether producing a black tarry resin and some acetaldehyde.

=== Anesthetic ===
In the United States, vinyl ether was sold under the trade name Vinethene. In addition to the normal inhibitors, vinyl ether intended for anesthetic use contained some ethanol (1.5-5%) to prevent frosting of the anesthetic mask. Despite inhibitors manufacturers warned that once opened vinyl ether should be used quickly.

Vinyl ether has a rapid onset with little excitement upon induction. Induction causes little coughing however it produces increased salivation. During anesthesia vinyl ether can cause some patients to twitch. In rare cases this twitching can lead to convulsions; these convulsions are treatable. Additionally, morphine-atropine pre-medication usually prevents this problem. The recovery from vinyl ether is rapid with only rare cases of post operative nausea and vomiting, although headache after anesthesia sometimes occurs.

Short operations pose little danger to the patient. Longer operations which use greater than 200 mL of anesthetic can be dangerous due to hepatic and renal toxicity. In an attempt to circumvent the toxicity of vinyl ether while maintaining its favorable properties it was mixed 1:4 with ethyl ether producing ‘Vinethene Anesthetic Mixture’ (V.A.M.). V.A.M. shows smoother induction and recovery than ethyl ether alone yet is relatively non-toxic for longer procedures. Though compared to ethyl ether V.A.M. is less suitable for cases requiring deep anesthesia.

Vinyl ether is a potent anesthetic giving it a large safety margin; the ratio of the anesthetic to lethal dose for vinyl ether is 1 to 2.4 (ethyl ether: 1:1.5). However, this potency is hard to control with simplistic equipment. While anesthetic machines were numerous during the years of vinyl ether's popularity, the simplistic ‘open drop technique’ also maintained its prevalence. Anesthetic machines of the time could suitably contain vinyl ether's potency, however, via the open drop technique smooth anesthesia for long procedures was hard to sustain. Further aggravating this problem, warm temperatures increase the volatility of vinyl ether making it even harder to regulate via the open drop technique.

Overall, vinyl ether's only strengths compared to ethyl ether are favorable induction and recovery. During anesthesia vinyl ether has no particularly wonderful properties and is harder to control than other agents. Therefore, vinyl ether was commonly used as a preliminary anesthetic before administration of diethyl ether. Additionally, vinyl ether was only used for short operations or analgesia, e.g. dentistry and obstetrics. Vinyl ether was used infrequently for long operations because of toxicity, cost, and superior alternatives.

Also, experiments were conducted with ethyl vinyl ether, a compound with one vinyl and one ethyl group. This substance produced results placing it between diethyl ether and divinyl ether both in terms of toxicity and speed of induction and recovery, producing promising results similar to V.A.M. Despite much simpler synthesis (vinylization of ethanol with acetylene) ethyl vinyl ether didn't enter widespread use in anesthetics, as superior halogenated ethers replaced it shortly after its first trials.

Many divinyl ether derivatives of fatty acids exist in nature.
