= Sisters of Saint Francis of Rochester, Minnesota =

Roman Catholic religious congregation

Coordinates: 44°02′26″N 92°28′48″W

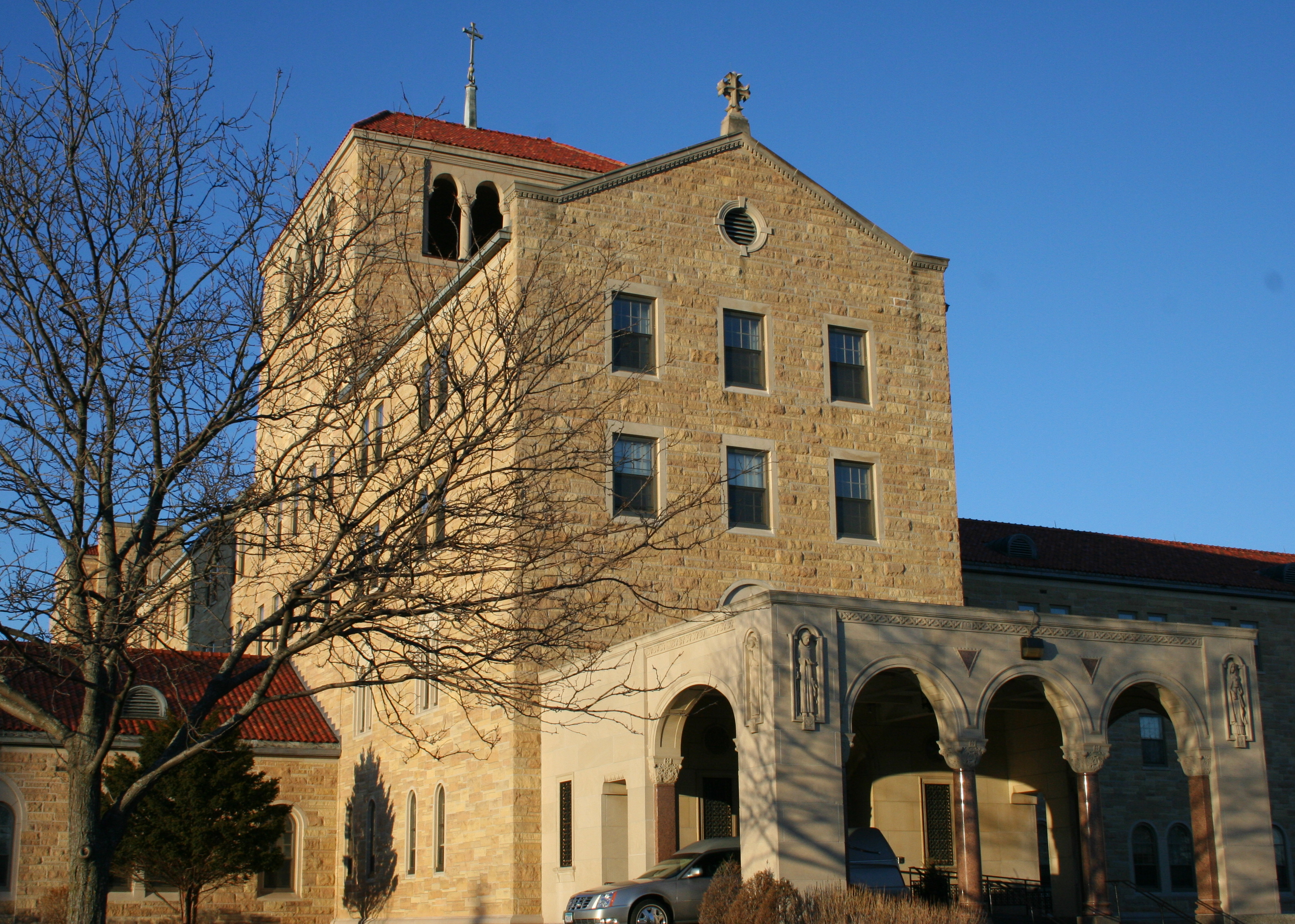
Assisi Heights mother house.

The Sisters of Saint Francis of Rochester, Minnesota is a Roman Catholic religious congregation for women. The congregation was founded in 1877 by Mother Mary Alfred Moes in the Diocese of St. Paul of Minnesota. The motherhouse, which is in Rochester, Minnesota, is called Assisi Heights.

== History ==
In 1876, Sister Mary Alfred Moes, along with her birth sister, Sister Barbara (Catherine) Moes, and 23 other Franciscan Sisters from Joliet, Illinois, came to Rochester, Minnesota, to establish Our Lady of Lourdes School. However, in 1877, a dispute over finances regarding the new academy led Chicago Bishop Thomas Foley to direct the sisters to separate from the Joliet Community.

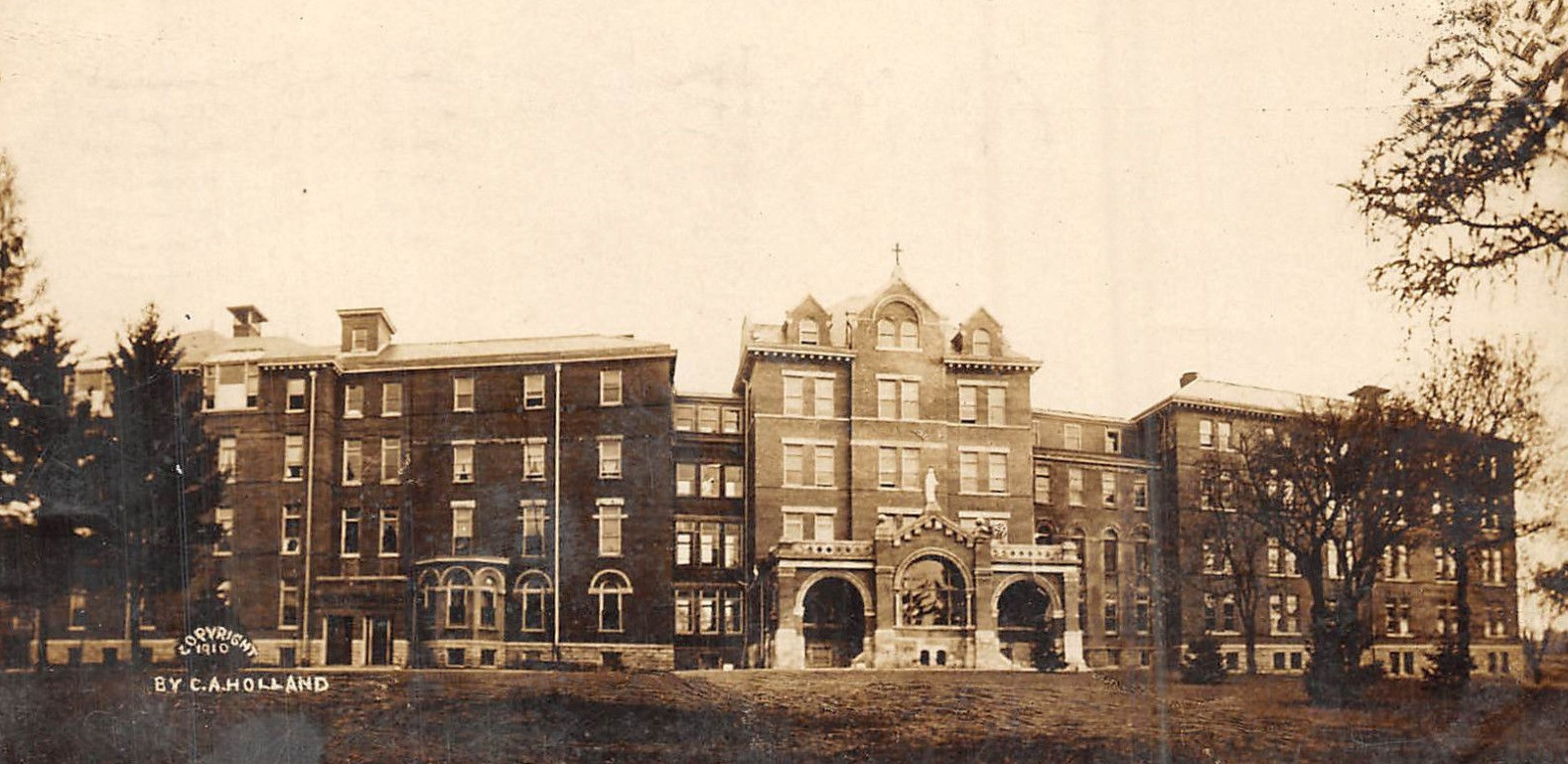
St. Mary's Hospital in 1910

The congregation founded Saint Marys Hospital (Rochester), which is now part of the Mayo Clinic. The grounds were purchased by the sisters, and the building was erected under the supervision of the Mother Superior. Sister-nurses tended to the sick, cooked the patients’ meals, did the laundry, stoked the furnace and even used the hair of convent horses to make surgical sutures.

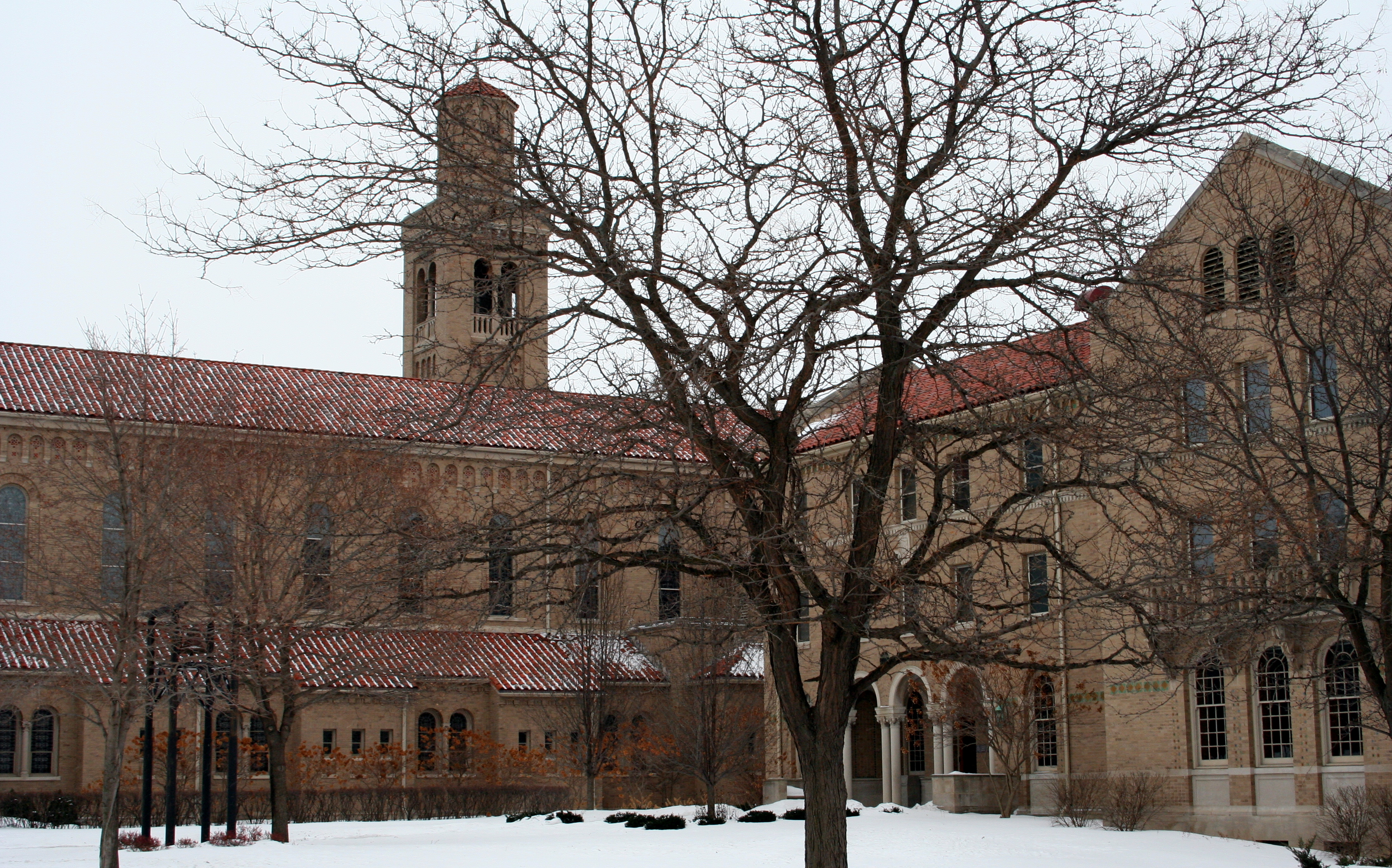
Chapel and convent buildings of the College of Saint Teresa in Winona, Minnesota.

The Sisters also continued their work in education, staffing parochial schools in Minnesota and beyond, while also establishing academies in Owatonna and Rochester. Their work included post-secondary education, and in 1894, they founded what would become the College of Saint Teresa in Winona, Minnesota.

== Present day ==
Many Sisters work in areas of social service, spiritual care and service abroad. Others continued their ministries in health care and education. The Sisters operate schools and a clinic in Bogotá, Colombia. They also run a spiritual retreat center in Janesville, Minnesota. As of 2004, there were about 300 members of the congregation.

== See also ==
- Florence Church Bullard
- St. Francis, Minnesota
- Women of Mayo Clinic
