= N-Phenylnaphthalen-1-amine =

Names
- Preferred IUPAC name N-Phenylnaphthalen-1-amine
- Other names: Anilinonaphthalene; α-Naphthylphenylamine; N-phenyl-1-naphthylamine; Phenyl-alpha-naphthylamine

Identifiers
CAS Number	90-30-2
3D model (JSmol)	Interactive image
Abbreviations	NPN, PANA
ChEBI	CHEBI:34876
ChEMBL	ChEMBL170408
ChemSpider	6746
ECHA InfoCard	100.001.803
EC Number	201-983-0
KEGG	C14405
PubChem CID	7013
RTECS number	QM4500000
UNII	5I112077IN
UN number	3077
CompTox Dashboard (EPA)	DTXSID2025892
- InChI: InChI=1S/C16H13N/c1-2-9-14(10-3-1)17-16-12-6-8-13-7-4-5-11-15(13)16/h1-12,17H Key: XQVWYOYUZDUNRW-UHFFFAOYSA-N; InChI=1/C16H13N/c1-2-9-14(10-3-1)17-16-12-6-8-13-7-4-5-11-15(13)16/h1-12,17H Key: XQVWYOYUZDUNRW-UHFFFAOYAN
- SMILES: c3c(Nc1ccccc1)c2ccccc2cc3

Properties
Chemical formula	C_{16}H_{13}N
Molar mass	219.287 g·mol^{−1}
Appearance	white to slightly yellowish prisms or reddish brown crystalline powder
Odor	amine-like
Density	1.16 g/cm^{3}
Melting point	60 °C (140 °F; 333 K)
Boiling point	226 °C (439 °F; 499 K)
Solubility in water	insoluble in water
Solubility	highly soluble in acetonitrile soluble in ethanol, acetic acid, benzene

Hazards
- GHS labelling
Pictograms	(GHS07: Exclamation mark) (GHS08: Health hazard) (GHS09: Environmental hazard)
Signal word	Warning
Hazard statements	H302, H317, H373, H410
Precautionary statements	P261, P264, P270, P272, P273, P280, P301+P317, P302+P352, P319, P321, P330, P333+P317, P362+P364, P391, P501
- Except where otherwise noted, data are given for materials in their standard state (at 25 °C [77 °F], 100 kPa). Infobox references

N-Phenylnaphthalen-1-amine (NPN) is an aromatic amine with the chemical formula C_{16}H_{12}NH. It is commonly used as a stabilizer and antioxidant in rubber, as well as a precursor for azo dyes. Additionally, it has applications as a fluorescent probe in biochemical research.

== Synthesis and properties ==
NPN can be prepared by reacting aniline and 1-naphthylamine at 100-400°C in the presence of a catalyst. Some catalysts used for this process include p-toluenesulfonic acid, sulfanilic acid, or iodine.

Many of N-phenylnaphthalen-1-amine's applications leverage the fact that it is quite hydrophobic, preferring to incorporate in the interior of micelles and related structures. One model protein used to investigate NPN's hydrophobic properties is mouse major urinary protein (MUP). NPN binds to the beta barrel cavity present in the protein, forming extensive nonpolar contacts with hydrophobic side chains.

=== Fluorescence ===
While N-phenylnaphthalen-1-amine fluoresces in an aqueous solution, its fluorescent output is limited by its low solubility in water. Under nonpolar conditions the quantum yield increases approximately 10-fold, making it useful for examining the properties of membranes or other nonpolar conditions. Solution viscosity has also been shown to impact the fluorescent yield of NPN, increasing the fluorescence intensity similar to exposure to a nonpolar solvent. NPN fluoresces at anywhere between 400-435 nm upon excitation with 356 nm. This wavelength is blue-shifted upon exposure to an apolar environment.

== Applications ==
=== Membrane studies ===
Because it only exhibits fluorescence in non-polar environments, N-phenylnaphthalen-1-amine is commonly used as a probe to study the function of the cell membrane. NPN is a good probe for examining lipid packing and membrane fluidity due to its sensitivity to viscosity.

NPN does not respond directly to membrane energization, but it can respond to changes in environment caused by changes in membrane potential. As a result, it can be used to indirectly evaluate the energy state of a membrane. This has been demonstrated in studies utilizing E. coli, where NPN was used as a probe to evaluate changes in membrane fluorescence upon exposure to glucose.

=== Surfactant interactions ===
N-phenylnaphthalen-1-amine can be used as a fluorescent probe for the determination of the critical micelle concentration of surfactants in solution. Because NPN only fluoresces in the presence of micelles, it can be used to quantify the amount of surfactant present in a solution. This is an important technique in biopharmaceutical manufacturing, where surfactants are used to stabilize biological molecules such as proteins. NPN has been used to quantify surfactants such as polysorbate 20 or polysorbate 80 in solution for both in-process and drug substance samples. This technique may utilize high-performance liquid chromatography (HPLC) detectors or it can be performed in a plate-based bioassay.

=== Dye production ===
N-phenylnaphthalen-1-amine can be used as a precursor for azo dyes, molecules which contain a R−N=N−R′ functional group. Diazonium salts are added to NPN dissolved in acetic acid, causing a diazo coupling reaction.

NPN may also be used in the production of triarylmethane dyes such as victoria blue. Michler's ketone is reacted with NPN to produce Victoria Blue B, used in paper and pen inks.

=== Rubber and lubricants ===
N-phenylnaphthalen-1-amine is utilized as an antioxidant in synthetic lubricants and rubber products, particularly in high temperature applications. As a result PANA is commonly utilized in jet engine oils. In rubber production it may be utilized in the production of both natural and synthetic rubber, acting as a stabilizer in products such as tires and gaskets.
