= Henry Hamilton Bailey =

Surgeon and author of surgical textbooks

Hamilton Bailey
- Born: Henry Hamilton Bailey; 1 October 1894; Bishopstoke, Hampshire
- Died: 25 March 1961 (aged 66); Malaga, Spain
- Education: London Hospital Medical College
- Occupation: Surgeon
- Known for: Surgical textbooks
- Medical career
- Institutions: London Hospital, Dudley Road, Birmingham, Royal Northern Hospital, London

Henry Hamilton Bailey (1 October 1894 – 25 March 1961) was a British surgeon. Bailey became one of the most influential authors of surgical textbooks in the 20th century. When publishing, and perhaps for much of his working life, he dropped his first name, becoming Hamilton Bailey. He was a pioneer in the use of illustrations and photographs in surgical textbooks.

== Life ==
Hamilton was born to a medical missionary. He had a brother who died aged two days after birth, and a sister who was institutionalized with schizophrenia at the age of 18.

As a fourth year medical student of London Hospital Medical College, he volunteered as part of the 1st Belgian Unit of the British Red Cross on 1914. In the same year, he was captured and made a prisoner of war. As a prisoner of war he was sentenced to death for suspected sabotage, but following an American intervention was released by the Germans along with other medical and nursing staff. He subsequently (25 August 1916) became a temporary surgeon with the Royal Navy, serving aboard HMS Inflexible, HMS M19 and HMS Iron Duke.

After the war, while working as a surgical registrar, he suffered an infection following a finger injury while performing surgery, eventually leading to amputation of his left index finger; this can be seen in the illustrations of some of his books (his Figure 137 showing Bimanual palpation of the spleen gives a clear orientation). His first independent post was as a surgeon to Dudley Road Hospital, Birmingham (1926), where many of the photos that would illustrate his first book were taken. He left in 1930, soon joining the staff of the Royal Northern Hospital, London. He was also a Hunterian Professor at the Royal College of Surgeons and a vice-president of the International College of Surgeons.

He married a photographer, Vera Gillender, in 1925, who collaborated with him in the production of photographs for his books. Hamilton and Vera had one son, who died aged 15 in a railway accident while returning from evacuation in the north of England.

Hamilton was incarcerated for three years in 1949 for a mental condition involving mania and paranoia, which was eventually successfully treated with lithium therapy.

He died of intestinal obstruction (or subsequent surgical complications) secondary to colonic carcinoma, on 25 March 1961 in Malaga.

== Selected publications ==
- Demonstrations of Physical Signs in Clinical Surgery (1927); subsequent through many editions, continuing as Hamilton Bailey's Demonstration of Physical Signs in Clinical Surgery, up to the 18th Ed. in 1997 by John S.P Lumley. A 19th edition expected in late 2015 (by. John S.P Lumley and Anil K. D'Cruz).
- Branchial cysts and other essays on surgical subjects in the facio-cervical region (1929).
- Emergency Surgery (1930-1)
- A Short Practice of Surgery (1932)
- Surgery for Nurses (1933)
- Recent advances in genito-urinary surgery (1936)
- Diseases of the Testicle (1936)
- Clinical surgery for dental practitioners (1937)
- Surgery of modern warfare (1940). A later entire edition was purchased by US Armed Forces for distribution to their medical corp.
