= Mayo Clinic Alix School of Medicine =

Medical school in Rochester, Minnesota, US

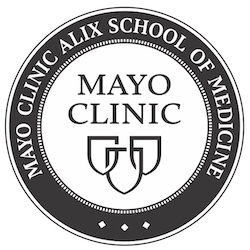
- Former names: Mayo Clinic School of Medicine (2017–2018); Mayo Medical School (until 2017)
- Motto: Non multa sed bona (Latin)
- Motto in English: Not many, but good
- Type: Private nonprofit medical school
- Established: 1972
- Parent institution: Mayo Clinic College of Medicine and Science
- Dean: Fredric B. Meyer
- Academic staff: 4,590 (total); 845 (full-time)
- Doctoral students: 362
- Location: Rochester, Minnesota, United States; 44.0213°N 92.4670°W
- Campus: Urban
- Mascot: Owl
- Website: college.mayo.edu/academics/mayo-clinic-alix-school-of-medicine/

The Mayo Clinic Alix School of Medicine (MCASOM), formerly known as Mayo Medical School (MMS), is a research-oriented medical school based in Rochester, Minnesota, with additional campuses in Arizona and Florida. MCASOM is a school within the Mayo Clinic College of Medicine and Science (MCCMS), the education division of the Mayo Clinic. It grants the Doctor of Medicine (M.D.) degree and is accredited by the Higher Learning Commission (HLC) and the Liaison Committee on Medical Education (LCME). In November 2018, the school was renamed in honor of a $200 million donation from businessman Jay Alix, founder of AlixPartners.

== History ==
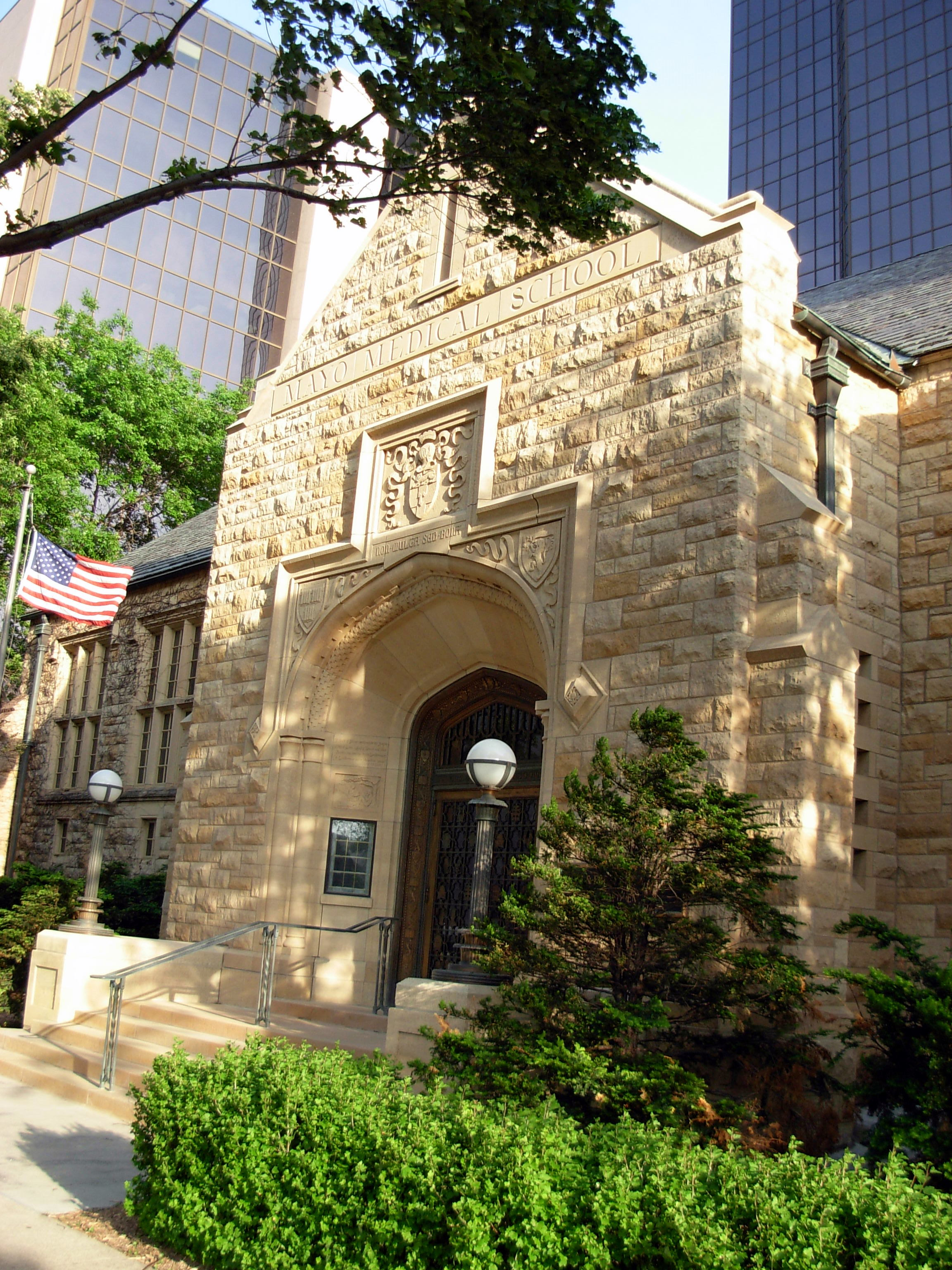
Mitchell Student Center in Rochester, MN

The Mayo Foundation appointed cardiologist Raymond Pruitt as the first dean of the Mayo Medical School (now Mayo Clinic Alix School of Medicine) in 1970, publicly announcing its creation the following year. It officially opened on September 5, 1972, with an inaugural class of 40 students, becoming the 110th medical school in the United States and the 2nd in Minnesota. Pruitt retired from the Mayo Foundation in January 1977. The second dean of the Mayo Medical School was John Thompson Shepherd, who served as dean from 1977 to 1983 and in 2003 published a memoir Inside the Mayo Clinic.

The MCASOM was accredited as a medical school by the LCME in 1972 but the Mayo Foundation did not have regional institutional accreditation for granting degrees. Therefore, the Mayo Foundation began operations of the MCASOM through an affiliation established with the University of Minnesota in 1915 for graduate degree and medical specialty programs. Thus the MCASOM granted its first M.D. degrees in 1976 under the University of Minnesota's North Central Association of Colleges and Schools (NCA) accreditation. The Mayo Foundation terminated their affiliation with the University of Minnesota in 1983, becoming an independent degree-granting institution accredited by the Higher Learning Commission of the NCA the following year.

A reorganization of the Mayo Foundation in 1989 spun out a new graduate degree-granting school called the Mayo Graduate School, now named the Mayo Clinic Graduate School of Biomedical Sciences (MCGSBS). This facilitated the start of the M.D.-Ph.D. program, which became the Mayo Clinic Medical Scientist Training Program (MSTP) in 2003 when it was first awarded a T32 grant by the National Institute of General Medical Sciences (NIGMS) of the National Institutes of Health (NIH).

=== Renaming ===
The Mayo Clinic Alix School of Medicine has been renamed twice. The first took place in 2017 when the school was renamed from Mayo Medical School to Mayo Clinic School of Medicine in order to clarify its focus and function more clearly. The second took place in November 2018, when it was renamed Mayo Clinic Alix School of Medicine in honor of a $200 million donation from businessman Jay Alix.

== Campuses ==
The Mayo Clinic Alix School of Medicine is integrated with the Mayo Clinic campuses in Rochester, Minnesota; Phoenix and Scottsdale, Arizona; and Jacksonville, Florida.

=== Rochester, Minnesota ===
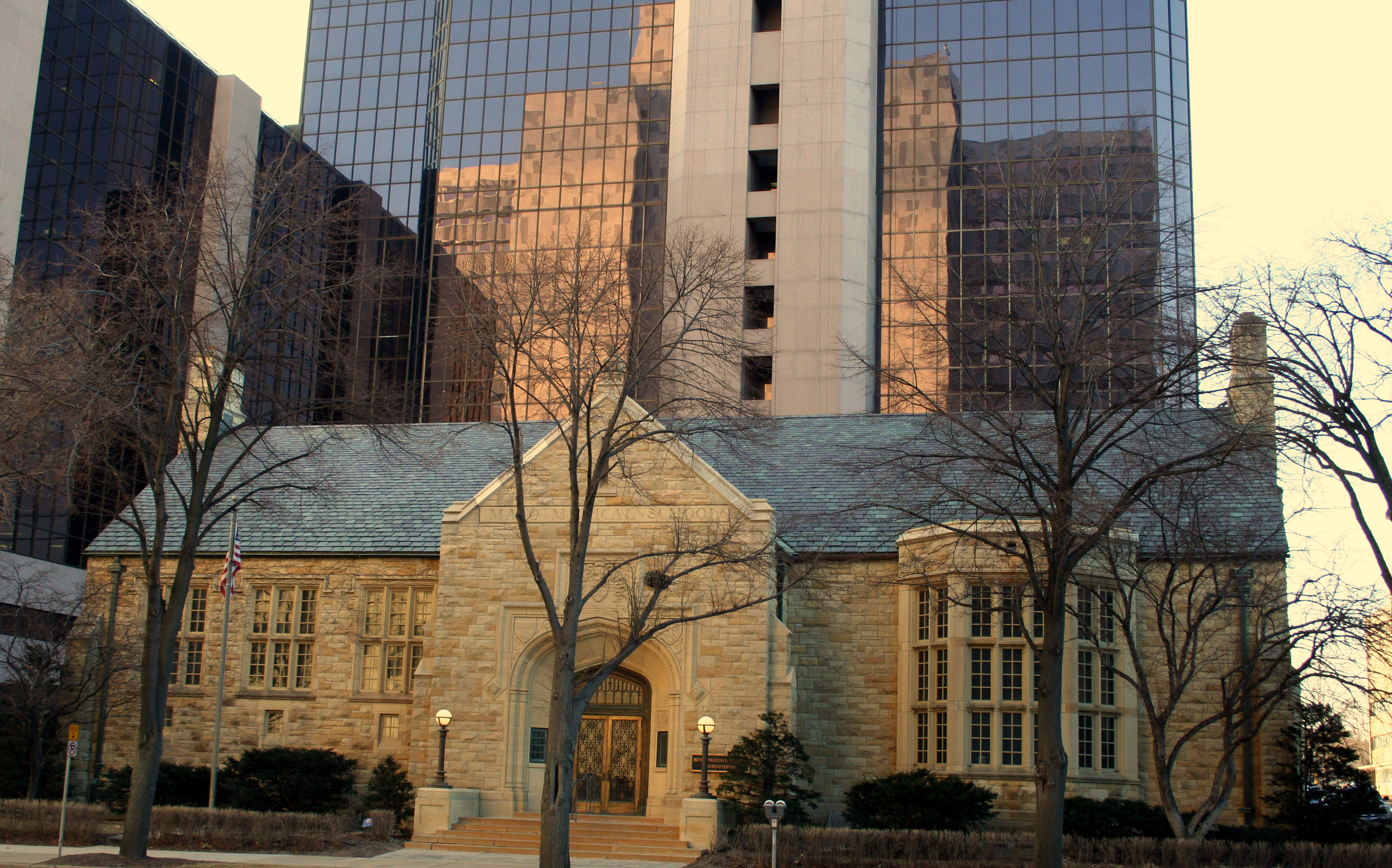
Mitchell Student Center in front of the Guggenheim Building

MCASOM has its administrative center and primary location at the Mayo Clinic in Rochester, Minnesota. It is the largest medical school campus in the United States, with 11.5 million square feet of medical and research space in a single location. Educational activities are based at the Mitchell Student Center and Guggenheim Building, particularly in the Kendall-Hench lecture hall. Students also attend classes and conduct laboratory exercises in the Stabile Building, which contains a state-of-the-art anatomy laboratory and a Multidisciplinary Simulation Center. The Plummer Building is home to the Mayo Clinic Libraries system—one of the largest medical libraries in the world—which offers students access to around 400,000 bound volumes and 4,800 medical and scientific journal subscriptions. The Gonda Building houses several seminar rooms and the Mayo Clinic Center for Innovation, a facility where students can develop ideas to improve health care alongside staff and entrepreneurs. The adjacent Mayo Building has a number of conference rooms used for small group exercises. Together, the Gonda and Mayo buildings comprise the core outpatient clinical practice facilities in downtown Rochester. The Mayo Clinic Hospital — Rochester provides extensive inpatient learning experiences for medical students with 2,059 licensed beds and 115 operating rooms across the Methodist Campus, Saint Marys Campus, and Mayo Eugenio Litta Children's Hospital.

Each year, the Rochester campus matriculates 46 M.D. students, 7 M.D.-Ph.D. students, and 2 M.D.-O.M.S. students, for a total incoming class size of 55. These students have the opportunity to complete their selective experiences, third- and fourth-year rotations, clinical electives, and research projects (including Ph.D. dissertations) at the campuses in Arizona and Florida.

The City of Rochester is currently undergoing a 20-year, $5.6 billion infrastructure improvement project called the Destination Medical Center (DMC). This public–private partnership, which started in 2013, matches public investment from a legislative bill for transportation infrastructure to private investments from the Mayo Clinic on its Rochester facilities. The overarching goal is to turn the campus into a global destination for health and wellness. Regional plans from the Rochester-Olmsted Council of Governments aim to attract outside companies and investments in the biotechnology industry and to double the population of the city by the year 2040.

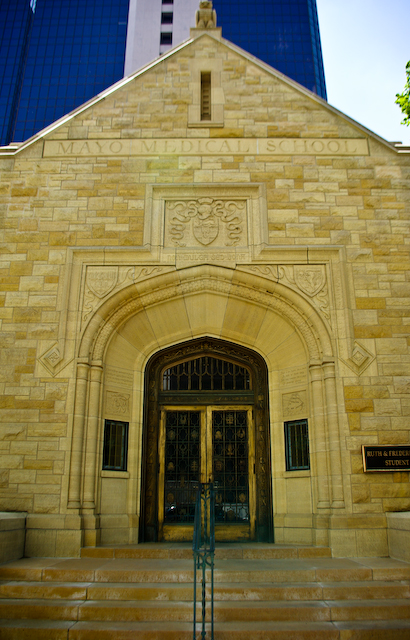
Mitchell Student Center facade

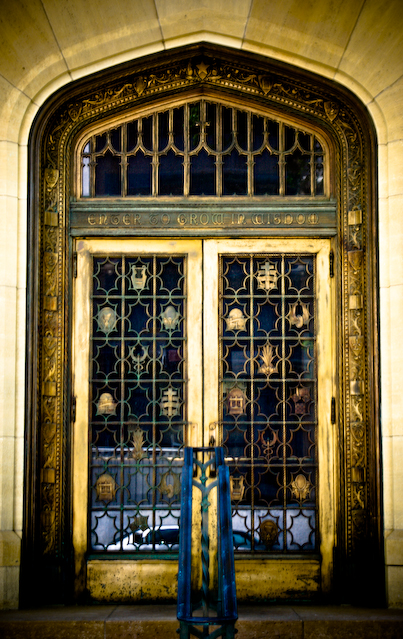
Mitchell Student Center doorway

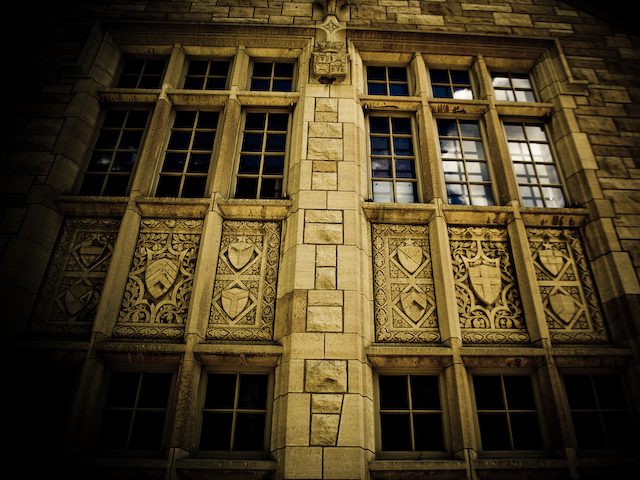
Mitchell Student Center architecture

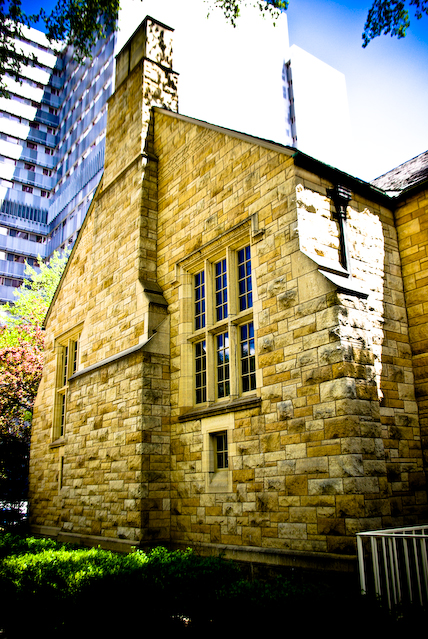
Mitchell Student Center side view

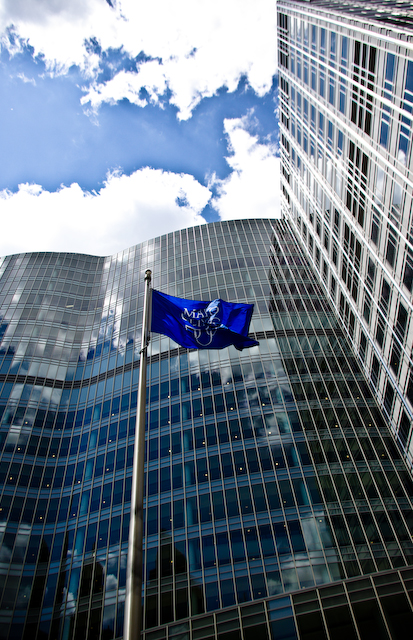
Gonda Building with Mayo Clinic flag

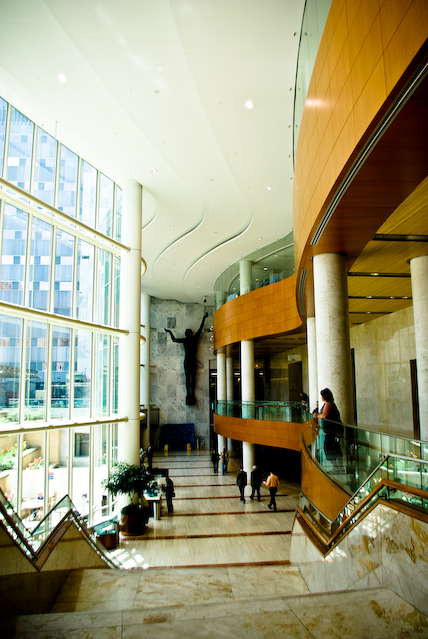
Gonda Building Grand Staircase

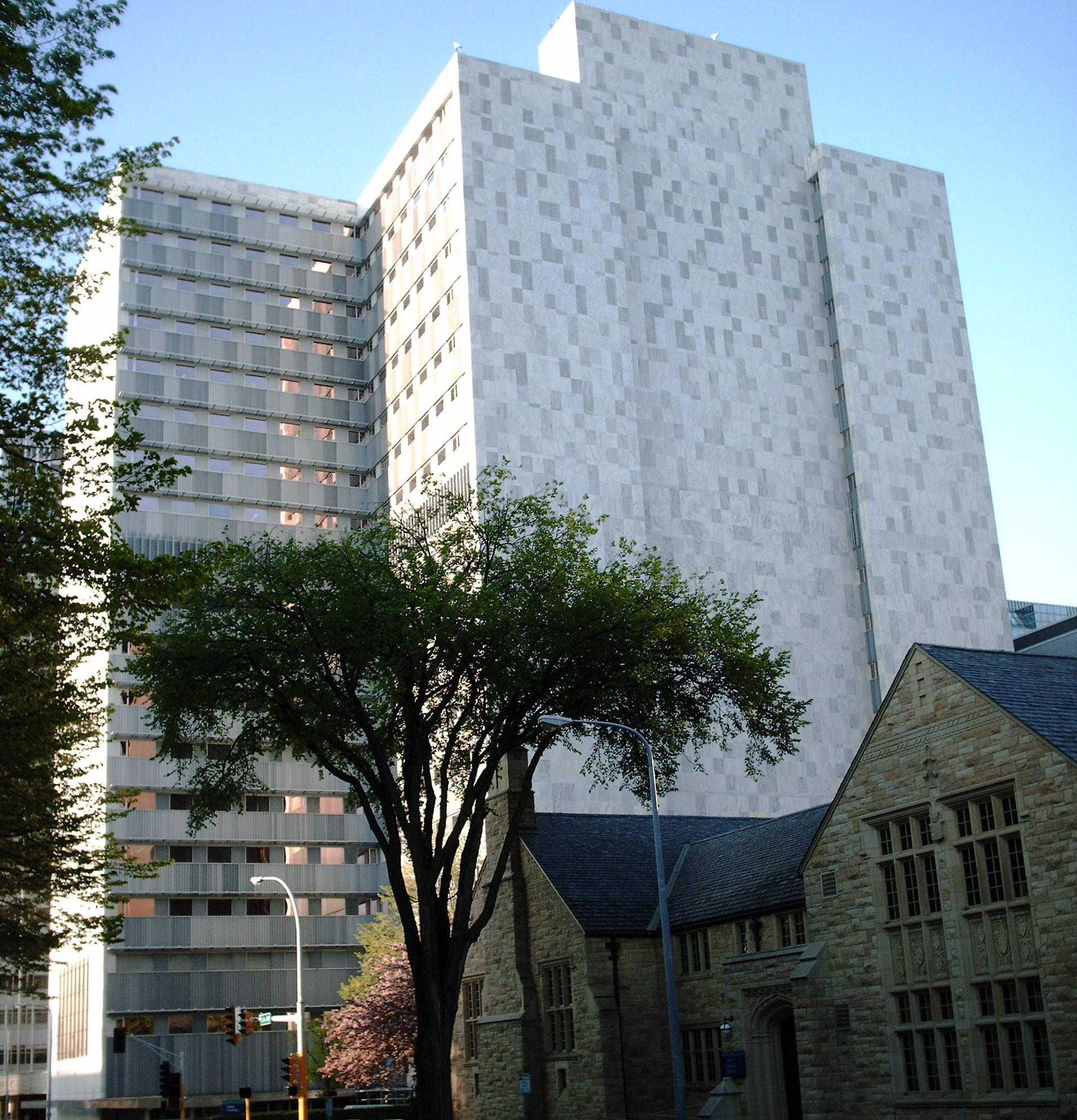
Mayo Building behind the Mitchell Student Center

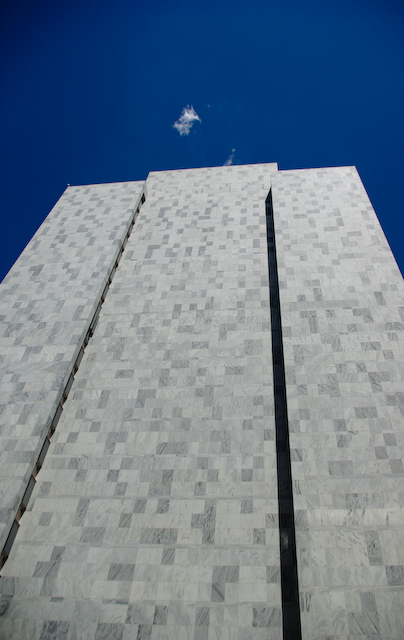
Mayo Building side view

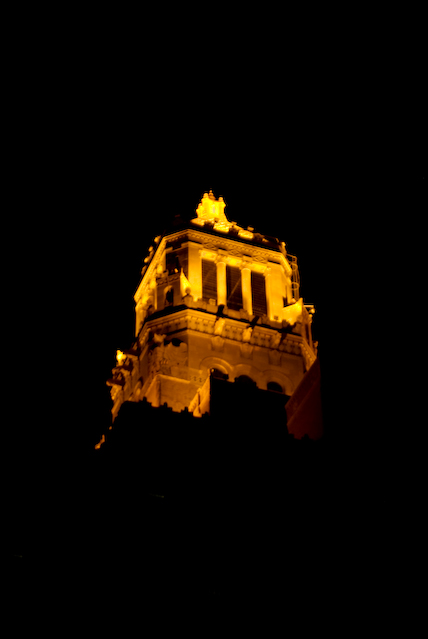
Plummer Building at night

=== Phoenix and Scottsdale, Arizona ===
MCASOM expanded its four-year medical school class to the Mayo Clinic Arizona campus in 2017. Arizona-based medical students have their preclinical classes in Scottsdale, then complete most of their clerkships at the Mayo Clinic Arizona in Phoenix during years 3 and 4. They may also rotate in pediatrics and related subspecialties through a partnership at Phoenix Children's Hospital. The Maricopa Integrated Health System offers medical students expanded rotation opportunities in psychiatry. Students may also rotate through the Carl T. Hayden Veterans Affairs Hospital for internal medicine and psychiatry.

Each year, the Arizona campus matriculates 50 M.D. students.

=== Jacksonville, Florida ===
In addition to selectives and clerkships, up to 12 MCASOM students based in either Minnesota or Arizona have the option to complete years 3 and 4 at the Mayo Clinic Florida campus (Florida FOCUS 2+2 track).

== Academics ==
The Mayo Clinic Alix School of Medicine is a founding member of the American Medical Association Accelerating Change in Medical Education Consortium.

The MCASOM Anatomy course in the fall of 2015 was featured in the documentary film The First Patient, written and directed by Chip Duncan.

=== Selectives ===
A unique feature of the MCASOM curriculum are the selectives, which have been shown to increase medical student academic productivity and the desire to conduct future research. There are twenty-eight undesignated weeks between blocks spread out during the first two years. Twelve of these weeks can be used as vacation or for dedicated USMLE Step 1 study time. The other sixteen must be spent doing something medically-related for at least 20 hours per week—these are termed selectives. Selectives allow students to shadow physicians, learn surgical skills, volunteer in free clinics, remediate courses, or do research. Each student is eligible for up to $1,500 in travel funding per year in order to visit other Mayo Clinic campuses, present research, or serve indigent patients. Established selective options include the Bounce Day course in emergency preparedness, Regenerative Medicine and Surgery, and Mission:BRAIN global health trips with Professor of Neurologic Surgery Alfredo Quiñones-Hinojosa.

=== Science of Health Care Delivery Certificate ===
Starting with the incoming class of 2015, the school has formally integrated longitudinal coursework in the Science of Health Care Delivery (SHCD) into the four-year curriculum. This coursework entails a mixture of lectures and practical experiences. Studies of SHCD comprise six major domains: leadership, person-centered care, high value care, health economics and technology, population-centered care, and team-based care. The SHCD curriculum adds a social sciences perspective to the traditional medical school model, aiming to produce physicians aware of and capable of addressing problems in the US health care system.

=== Student-run and volunteer clinics ===
Students fulfill a community service requirement by seeing uninsured and underinsured patients at the Rochester Education and Advocacy for Community Health (REACH) free clinic throughout Year 2. Interested students can volunteer to staff other local free clinics—the Smoking Cessation Clinic, the Center Clinic in Dodge Center, and the Mayo Family Medicine Resident Clinic in Kasson—for selective credit or just to gain more experience.

In Phoenix, Arizona, first- and second-year students see patients at St. Vincent de Paul community clinic.

=== Academic partnerships ===
Mayo Clinic Alix School of Medicine partners with several universities to offer its students access to expanded dual degree (e.g. medicine combined with law, business, or engineering) and study abroad opportunities.

==== Arizona State University (ASU) ====
The Mayo Clinic and Arizona State University Alliance for Health Care offers expanded academic and research opportunities for MCASOM students at ASU. This program allows medical students to earn additional degrees through ASU, including a Juris Doctor (J.D.) and a Master of Business Administration (M.B.A.).

==== Paracelsus Medical University (PMU) ====
Paracelsus Medical University was developed based on the model and in close cooperation with MCASOM. PMU offers MCASOM students full scholarships to pursue medical research and clinical fellowships for up to one year at its campuses in Salzburg (Austria) and Nuremberg (Germany).

==== University of Oxford ====
MCASOM students have the opportunity to be involved (e.g. through selectives or student exchanges) at Mayo Clinic's London operation in partnership with the University of Oxford and the Oxford University Hospitals NHS Foundation Trust.

== Rankings ==
In 2021, U.S. News & World Report ranked Mayo Clinic Alix School of Medicine #11 (tie) on their "Best Medical Schools: Research" list. MCASOM is the most selective medical school in the United States, with the lowest acceptance rate (2.1%) among schools submitting data for the 2017-2018 application cycle.

MCASOM students receive their hospital training at the Mayo Clinic Rochester, ranked #1 on the 2018-19 U.S. News & World Report Best Hospitals Honor Roll, as well as at the Mayo Clinic Phoenix (#11 on Best Hospitals Honor Roll) and the Mayo Clinic Jacksonville.

== Culture and traditions ==
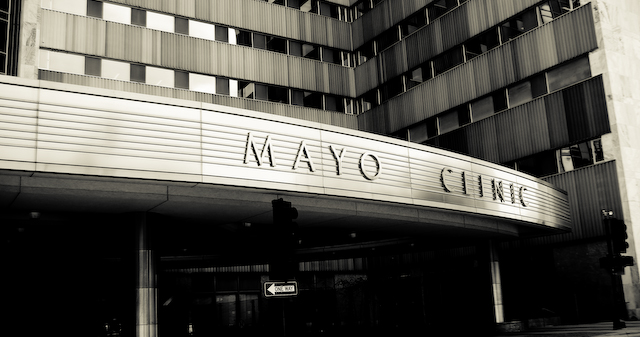
Gonda Building main entrance

The Mayo Clinic Alix School of Medicine has a distinct culture from that of most other medical schools. Mayo medical students wear business attire (often referred to as "Mayo wear") instead of white coats in the clinic to convey professionalism and respect for patients. Accordingly, there is no white coat ceremony—first-year students instead participate in a Commitment to Human Values ceremony in which they make their Physician's Pledge to Patients, Colleagues, and Society (adapted from the Hippocratic Oath).

Students at MCASOM are party to other Mayo Clinic traditions during their training. At the Mayo Clinic, faculty doctors are referred to as "consultants", as opposed to the term "attending" used elsewhere. Additionally, because the Mayo brothers were left-handed surgeons, Mayo medical students are taught to glove their left hand first when scrubbing in to procedures. First-year students also learn formal dining etiquette for meals at the Mayo Foundation House in preparation for benefactor events, visiting dignitaries, and society dinners (e.g. Mayo Clinic Oncology Society, Sigma Xi).

=== Mentorship ===
First-year students are inducted into the Mayo Clinic Alumni Association (MCAA) and given their first stethoscopes by alumni. Medical students are encouraged to explore and develop their specialty interests early on through the Career Advisory and Mentorship Program—which pairs students with faculty physicians—as well as through their Mentorship Family. Because the Mayo Clinic has the largest residency and fellowship program in the United States, the MCAA Alumni Connect program provides medical students access to an extensive network of prominent physicians at a variety of institutions.

=== Student life ===
MCASOM students are eligible for membership in the Mayo Fellows Association, which puts together social events for medical and graduate students, residents, and fellows. Other social outlets available to students include the Mayo Employee Resource Groups (MERGs). These MERGs sponsor programs and activities for Mayo Clinic affiliates identifying with diverse communities, such as LGBTI, women leadership, and Native American heritage. The Alice Mayo Society and Mayo Families’ Connection offer moving, career, and social support for significant others of MCASOM students.

Arts and other creative pursuits are part of many students' experiences at MCASOM. The Mayo Clinic Dolores Jean Lavins Center for Humanities in Medicine sponsors year-round programs in art making, creative writing, improvisational theater, and musical performance. The center publishes The Tempest creative arts publication annually—a collection of poetry, prose, and visual art meant to illustrate the growth of medical students into physicians.
