= List of tallest buildings in Rochester =

List of tallest buildings in Rochester may refer to:

- List of tallest buildings in Rochester, New York
- List of tallest buildings in Rochester, Minnesota
