= John Thompson Shepherd =

American physician (1919–2011)

John Thompson Shepherd (21 May 1919 in Belfast, Ireland – 4 October 2011 in Rochester, Minnesota, United States) was a British-American cardiologist, medical researcher in cardiovascular physiology, and medical school dean. His research on the regulation of the cardiovascular system included "classic studies on reflex control of the circulation, haemodynamic responses to heat stress and exercise, and mechanisms of vasodilation."

== Biography ==
After graduation from Belfast's Campbell College, John T. Shepherd studied medicine at Queen's University Belfast, qualifying M.B. and B.Ch. in 1945 and M.Ch. in 1948. After completing his internship and residency at the Royal Victoria Hospital, Belfast, he became a staff member of the department of the physiology of Queen's University, Belfast. There in 1951 he received the research medical degree of M.D. He was awarded in 1953 a Fulbright Scholarship for one year to do cardiovascular research at the Mayo Clinic. He returned to Belfast in 1954 as a reader in physiology at Queen's University. In the department of physiology he had four close colleagues, namely Archibald David Mant Greenfield (1917–2005), Ian Campbell Roddie (1928–2011), Walter Ernest "Darty" Glover (1932–2017), and Robert Ford "Bob" Whelan (1922–1984), who later became deans of medical schools. In 1956 Shepherd received a D.Sc. from Queen's University Belfast. In 1957 he emigrated with his family to the United States and joined the staff of the Mayo Clinic, where he remained until his retirement in 1989.

From 1966 to 1974 he was a professor and the chair of the department of physiology and biophysics with a joint appointment at the Mayo Medical School (now named the Mayo Clinic Alix School of Medicine) and the Mayo Graduate School of Medicine.

He helped to train more than 100 research fellows. He was the author or co-author of several books and more than 300 scientific articles.

Shepherd was elected in 1951 a member of The Physiological Society and in 1977 a fellow of the Royal College of Physicians. He worked on space physiology with NASA and with scientists from the Soviet Union. From 1965 to 1974 he was the chair of the Committee on Space Medicine of the U.S. National Academy of Sciences. From 1975 to 1976 he was the president of the American Heart Association.

Two of his brothers and five among his nephews and nieces became physicians. In 1945 he married Helen Mary Johnston, who died in 1987. They had a daughter, Gillian, and a son, Roger, both of whom became physicians. Upon his death, John T. Shepherd was survived by his second wife, Marion, as well as his daughter and son from his first marriage, and "four step-children, five grandchildren, eight step-grandchildren and a great-grandson."

== Selected publications ==
=== Articles ===
- Shepherd, J. T. (1950). "Evaluation of Treatment in Intermittent Claudication". BMJ. 2 (4694): 1413–1418. doi:10.1136/bmj.2.4694.1413. PMC 2039597. PMID 14792042.
- Duff F; Greenfield AD; Shepherd JT; Thompson ID (1953). "A quantitative study of the response to acetylcholine and histamine of the blood vessels of the human hand and forearm". The Journal of Physiology. 120 (1–2): 160–170. doi:10.1113/jphysiol.1953.sp004883. PMC 1366029. PMID 13062230.
- Roddie IC; Shepherd JT; Whelan RF (1956). "Sympathetic cholinergic fibres producing vasodilatation in forearm skin". The Journal of Physiology. 134 (2): 13P–4P. PMID 13398935.
- Roddie IC; Shepherd JT; Whelan RF (1957). "The contribution of constrictor and dilator nerves to the skin vasodilatation during body heating". The Journal of Physiology. 136 (3): 489–497. doi:10.1113/jphysiol.1957.sp005775. PMC 1358869. PMID 13429515.
- Marshall RJ; Schirger A; Shepherd JT (1961). "Blood pressure during supine exercise in idiopathic orthostatic hypotension". Circulation. 24: 76–81. doi:10.1161/01.cir.24.1.76. PMID 13767236. S2CID 2736125.
- Donald DE; Shepherd JT (1963). "Response to Exercise in Dogs with Cardiac Denervation". The American Journal of Physiology. 205 (2): 393–400. doi:10.1152/ajplegacy.1963.205.2.393. PMID 14058123.
- Bevegård, B. S.; Shepherd, J. T. (1966). "Circulatory effects of stimulating the carotid arterial stretch receptors in man at rest and during exercise". Journal of Clinical Investigation. 45 (1): 132–142. doi:10.1172/JCI105317. PMC 292674. PMID 5901176.
- Strandell, Tore; Shepherd, John T. (2009). "The Effect in Humans of Increased Sympathetic Activity on the Blood Flow to Active Muscles". Acta Medica Scandinavica. 181: 146–167. doi:10.1111/j.0954-6820.1967.tb12622.x. PMID 5231558.
- Viles, Peter H.; Shepherd, John T. (1968). "Evidence for a Dilator Action of Carbon Dioxide on the Pulmonary Vessels of the Cat". Circulation Research. 22 (3): 325–332. doi:10.1161/01.RES.22.3.325. PMID 5639045. S2CID 6489125.
- Zitnik, Ralph S.; Burchell, Howard B.; Shepherd, John T. (1969). "Hemodynamic effects of inhalation of ammonia in man". The American Journal of Cardiology. 24 (2): 187–190. doi:10.1016/0002-9149(69)90402-0. PMID 5799080.
- Vanhoutte, P. M.; Shepherd, J. T. (1973). "Venous relaxation caused by acetylcholine acting on the sympathetic nerves". Circulation Research. 32 (2): 259–267. doi:10.1161/01.res.32.2.259. PMID 4685970. S2CID 259992.
- Mancia, G.; Shepherd, J. T.; Donald, D. E. (1976). "Interplay among carotid sinus, cardiopulmonary, and carotid body reflexes in dogs". The American Journal of Physiology. 230 (1): 19–24. doi:10.1152/ajplegacy.1976.230.1.19. PMID 1251904.
- Verhaeghe, R. H.; Vanhoutte, P. M.; Shepherd, J. T. (1977). "Inhibition of sympathetic neurotransmission in canine blood vessels by adenosine and adenine nucleotides". Circulation Research. 40 (2): 208–215. doi:10.1161/01.RES.40.2.208. PMID 191214. S2CID 16215262.
- Donald, David E.; Shepherd, John T. (1979). "Cardiac receptors: Normal and disturbed function". The American Journal of Cardiology. 44 (5): 873–878. doi:10.1016/0002-9149(79)90216-9. PMID 386768.
- Cohen, Richard A.; Shepherd, John T.; Vanhoutte, Paul M. (1983). "Inhibitory Role of the Endothelium in the Response of Isolated Coronary Arteries to Platelets". Science. 221 (4607): 273–274. Bibcode:1983Sci...221..273C. doi:10.1126/science.6574604. PMID 6574604.
- Shepherd, John T. (1985). "The heart as a sensory organ". Journal of the American College of Cardiology. 5 (6): 83B–87B. doi:10.1016/S0735-1097(85)80533-7. PMID 2987331. S2CID 38160966.
- Shepherd, J.; Katusic, Z. S.; Vedernikov, Y.; Vanhoutte, P. M. (1991). "Mechanisms of coronary vasospasm: Role of endothelium". Journal of Molecular and Cellular Cardiology. 23: 125–131. doi:10.1016/0022-2828(91)90031-G. PMID 2038073.
- Shepherd, J. T.; Bergan, J. J.; Cohen, R. A.; Hawiger, J. J.; Hillis, L. D.; Katzen, B. T.; Mohr, J. P. (1994). "Report of the Task Force on Vascular Medicine". Circulation. 89 (1): 532–535. doi:10.1161/01.CIR.89.1.532. PMID 8281694.
- Mancia, Giuseppe; Lüscher, Thomas F.; Shepherd, John T.; Noll, George; Grassi, Guido M. (2007). "Cardiovascular Regulation: Basic Considerations". Cardiovascular Medicine. pp. 1525–1539. doi:10.1007/978-1-84628-715-2_73. ISBN 978-1-84628-188-4.

=== Books ===
- Shepherd, John T. (1963). Physiology of the circulation in human limbs in health and disease. Philadelphia: W. B. Saunders.
- Marshall, Robert J.; Shepherd, John T. (1968). Cardiac function in health and disease. Philadelphia: W. B Saunders.
- Shepherd, John T.; Vanhoutte, Paul M. (1975). Veins and their control. London; Philadelphia: W. B. Saunders.
- Shepherd, John T.; Vanhoutte, Paul M. (1979). Human cardiovascular system: facts and concepts. New York: Raven Press. ISBN 9780890043677.
- Rowell, Loring G.; Shepherd, John T., eds. (1996). Exercise: regulation and integration of multiple systems. New York: Published for the American Physiological Society by Oxford University Press.
- Shepherd, John T. (2003). Inside the Mayo clinic: a memoir. Afton, Minnesota: Afton Historical Society Press; foreword by Walter F. Mondale
