= Broadway Plaza (Rochester, Minnesota) =

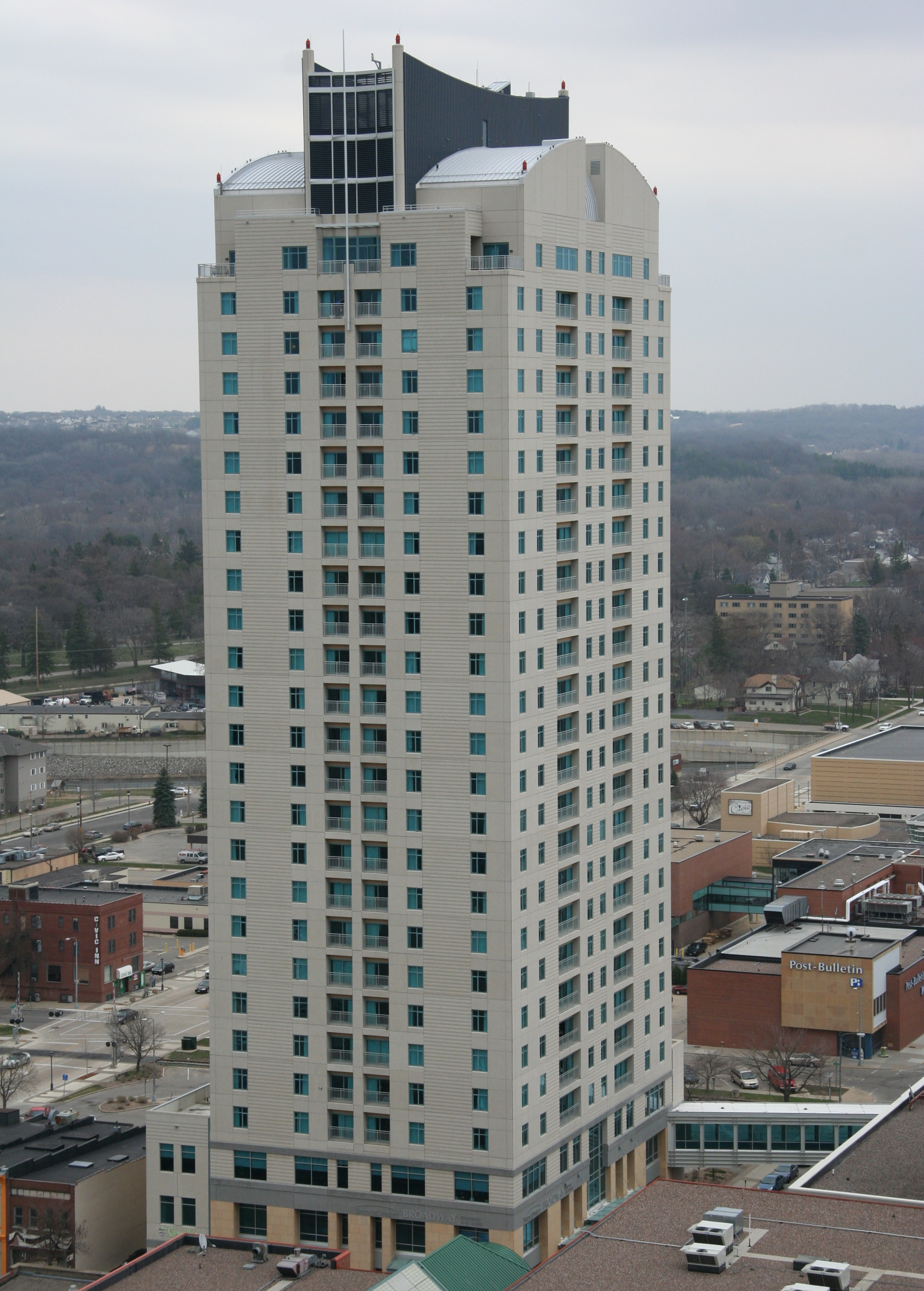
- Interactive map of the Broadway Plaza area

General information
- Type: Serviced furnished apartments
- Architectural style: Modern
- Location: 15 1st Street SE; Rochester, Minnesota
- Coordinates: 44.0228°N 92.4626°W
- Completed: 2004

Height
- Height: 342 feet (104 m)

Technical details
- Structural system: Hotel, Brick, Wood, Metal
- Floor count: 29 stories
- Floor area: 1,550 sq ft (144 m^{2})

Design and construction
- Architect: Burt Hill Kosar Rittelmann Associates
- Main contractor: BridgeStreet Worldwide

Other information
- Public transit access: RPT

Website
- www.rochesterbroadwayplaza.com

Broadway Plaza is a skyscraper located in Rochester, Minnesota, United States. It is 342 feet (104 meters) tall with 29 floors, and was completed in 2004. It is the tallest building in Rochester, and upon completion was the tallest residential building in a US city with a metropolitan area with a population less than 200,000. It is the 30th tallest building in Minnesota, and the tallest in the state outside of the Minneapolis-Saint Paul metropolitan area.

== See also ==
- List of tallest buildings in Rochester, Minnesota
