= Mayo Building (Rochester, Minnesota) =

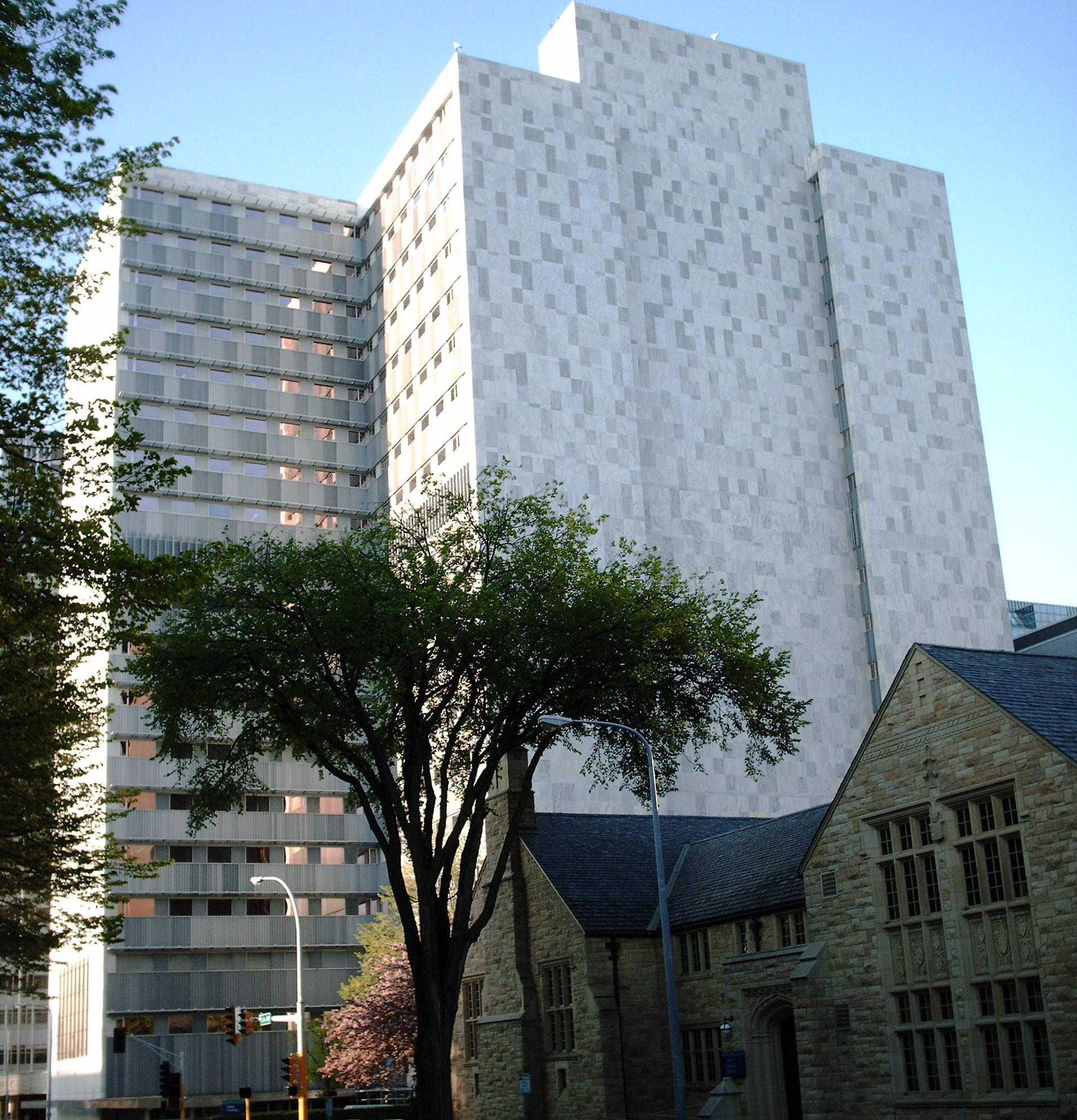
- The Mayo Building from Third Avenue with the Medical School Building in front.
- Interactive map of the Mayo Building area

General information
- Architectural style: Modern
- Location: Rochester, Minnesota
- Coordinates: 44°1′20″N 92°28′0″W
- Completed: 1955, 1970 expansion

Height
- Height: 300 ft

Technical details
- Floor count: 18 stories

Design and construction
- Architect: Ellerbe & Co.
- Main contractor: Mayo Clinic

Other information
- Public transit access: RPT

The Mayo Building is the main center of the Mayo Clinic in Rochester, Minnesota. When the original 10-story Mayo Building was completed in 1955 by designers of Ellerbe & Co., it had been the largest construction project undertaken by Mayo. The Mayo Clinic features artwork by many famous artists such as Andy Warhol. Floors hold patient care offices as well administrative offices. The physical shape of each floor is that of a greek cross when viewed from above, though now that it has conjoined with the Gonda Building since 2001, the shape is not as recognizable.

== T. Denny Sanford Pediatric Center ==
On June 20, 2007, the T. Denny Sanford Pediatric Outpatient Center opened, funded mostly by a $15-million gift from T. Denny Sanford, a credit card issuer and banker from South Dakota. The center is on the 16th floor of the Mayo Building and houses many pediatric subspecialty staff, who were previously spread out across the clinic. The floor is elaborately decorated and looks nothing like a common Mayo floor. The floor's theme is upper midwest habitat. Many artists collaborated and contributed to the work.

== See also ==
- Plummer Building, historic earlier Mayo Clinic building 1926 of, still standing
- List of tallest buildings in Rochester, Minnesota
