= Opus Imaging Research Building =

- Opus
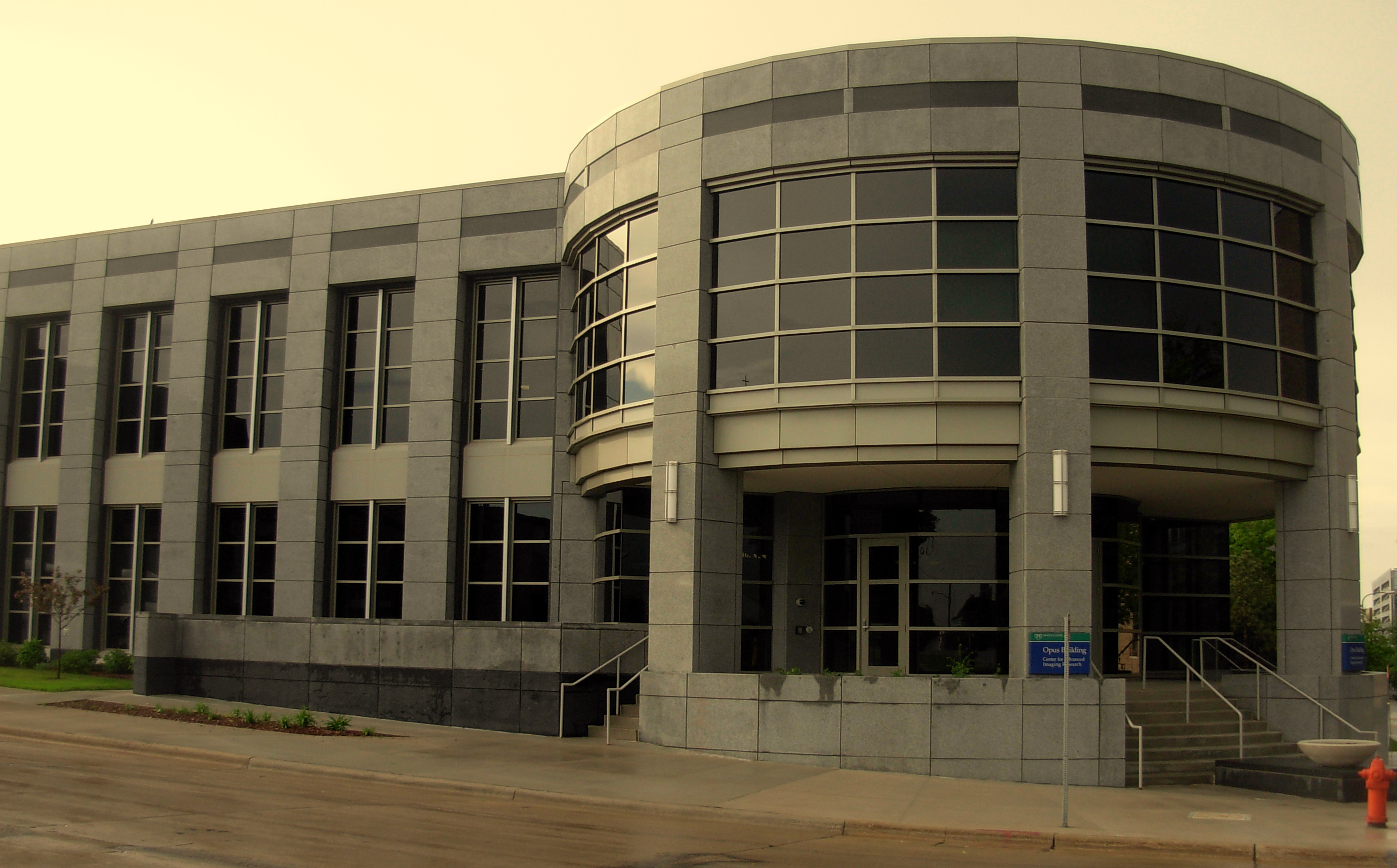
- South side of the Opus Building
- Interactive map of the Opus Imaging Research Building area

General information
- Architectural style: Modern
- Location: 333 4th Avenue SW, Rochester, Minnesota
- Coordinates: 44°1′11″N 92°28′7″W
- Construction started: 2006
- Completed: 2007 (intended)

Technical details
- Floor count: 3 stories

Design and construction
- Architect: Opus Group
- Main contractor: Mayo Clinic

Other information
- Public transit access: RPT

The Opus Imaging Research Building is a Mayo Clinic building in Rochester, Minnesota, United States. Groundbreaking ceremonies took place on March 22, 2006, with help of a $7 million donation from The Opus Group for the foundation of this medical imaging facility. The National Institutes of Health also donated to the sum of a $2.4 million capital grant. The building houses imaging research such as high-resolution MRIs and detailed scans of brains for studies of Alzheimer's disease and other afflictions.
