= Raymond Pruitt =

American cardiologist (1912–1993)

Raymond Donald Pruitt
- Born: February 6, 1912; Buffalo, New York, U.S.
- Died: January 14, 1993 (aged 80)
- Education: University of Kansas; Baker University
- Occupation: Physician
- Medical career
- Field: Cardiology

Raymond Donald Pruitt (February 6, 1912 - January 14, 1993) was an American physician specializing in cardiology who was the founding dean of the Mayo Medical School. An alumnus of Baker University, he received his medical degree from the University of Kansas and was also a Rhodes Scholar at the University of Oxford.
