= Siebens Building =

Building in Rochester, Minnesota, US

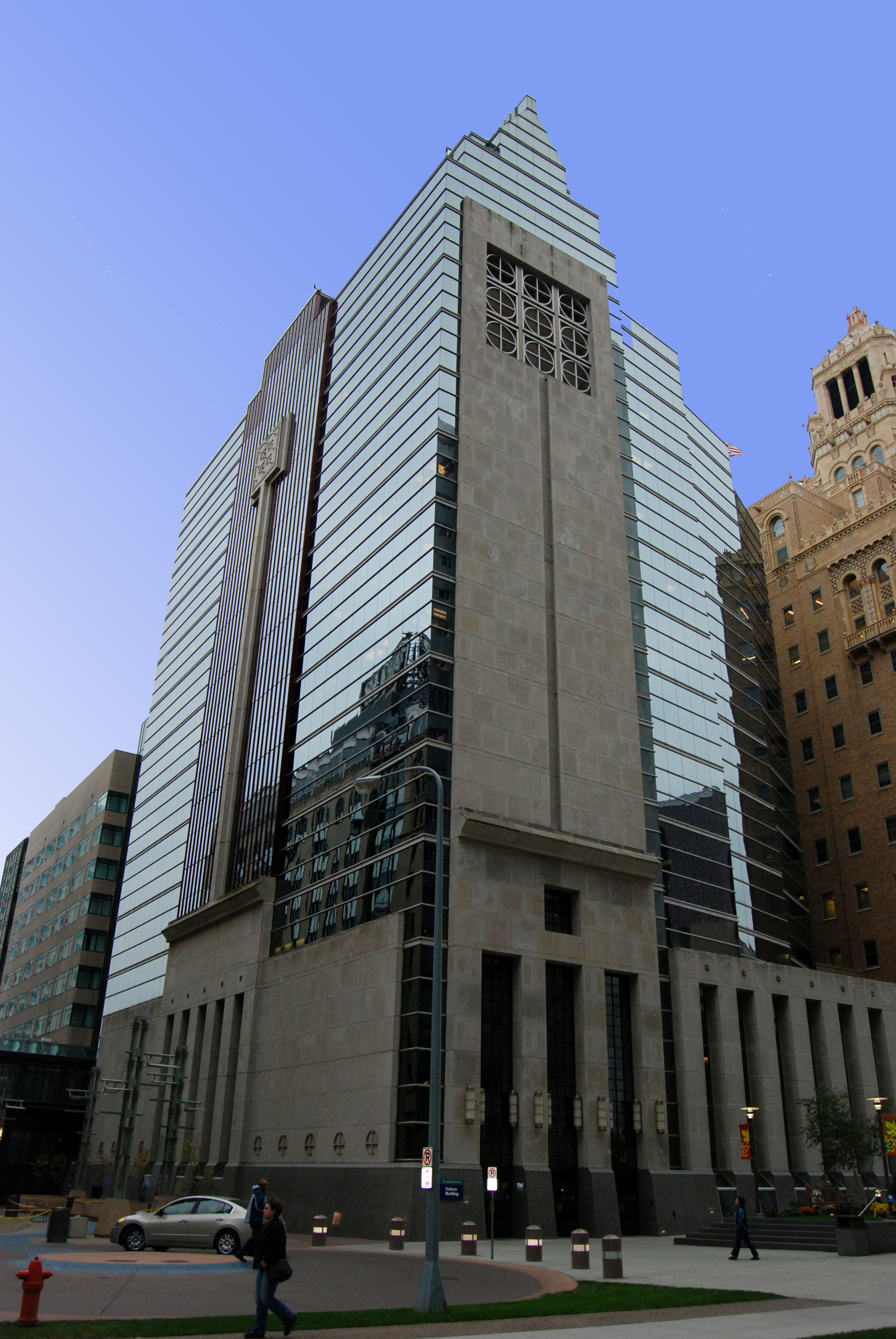
- The Siebens Building from the west
- Interactive map of the Siebens Building area

General information
- Architectural style: Postmodern
- Location: 100 2nd Avenue SW, Rochester, Minnesota
- Coordinates: 44°1′20″N 92°27′56″W
- Completed: 1989

Height
- Height: 220 feet (67 m)

Technical details
- Floor count: 14 stories

Design and construction
- Main contractor: Mayo Clinic

Other information
- Public transit access: RPT

The Siebens Building is a 220-foot (67 m) high-rise in Rochester, Minnesota, United States. It is built where the William Worrall Mayo home had been, and the original Mayo Clinic building was built on the site in 1914. The Siebens Building is operated by Mayo Clinic and is the center for educational activities and houses the Venables Health Science Library, classrooms and computer labs. The building also holds some Mayo Clinic administrative offices and study areas. The 14th floor—referred to as the "Greenhouse" for its glass, pitched ceilings or greenhouse-like look—is home to Mayo Clinic Volunteer Office.

The Siebens Building is formally dedicated as the Harold W Siebens Medical Education Building.

== See also ==
- List of tallest buildings in Rochester, Minnesota
