= Donald Balfour =

Canadian surgeon

Donald Church Balfour (August 22, 1882 – July 25, 1963) was a Canadian medical educator and surgeon who specialized in gastrointestinal surgery. He worked at the Mayo Clinic from 1907 until 1947, and was director of the Mayo Foundation for Medical Education and Research from 1937 to 1947.

== Biography ==
Balfour was born in Toronto, Ontario in 1882 and was educated at the Hamilton Collegiate Institute. He attended the University of Toronto, earning an M.B. degree in 1906 and M.D. in 1914. During his internship at Hamilton General Hospital in Hamilton, Ontario, he worked with the surgeon Ingersoll Olmsted, who recommended him to William James Mayo and Charles Horace Mayo. Balfour joined the Mayo brothers' practice in Rochester, Minnesota, in 1907, initially as a pathology assistant. In 1909 he became a junior surgeon and in 1912 he was promoted to head of a division of general surgery in what is now known as the Mayo Clinic. In 1910 he married William J. Mayo's daughter, Carrie Mayo.

Balfour worked primarily in gastrointestinal surgery, although he published papers in other surgical fields such as tonsillectomy and thyroidectomy. He designed various surgical instruments including abdominal retractors, operating tables and operating room mirrors; one of his landmark papers included a design for a stent to perform anastomosis between parts of the large intestine. He authored 225 publications and co-authored a textbook titled The Stomach and Duodenum (1935). Tuberculosis forced him to retire from surgery in 1933 and focus on medical education. He was appointed associate director of the Mayo Foundation for Medical Education and Research (now the Mayo Clinic College of Medicine and Science) in 1935 and served as director from 1937 to 1947. During the Second World War, Balfour served as an honorary consultant to the medical department of the U.S. Navy and to the Army Medical Library, and under his leadership the Mayo Foundation trained over 1500 medical officers of the armed forces. He retired from the Mayo Clinic and Mayo Foundation in 1947, and died in Rochester in 1963 from pulmonary edema caused by a myocardial infarction.

== Honors and affiliations ==
In 1948, Balfour was awarded the President's Certificate of Merit by President Harry S. Truman for contributions to the war effort. He received the American Medical Association's Distinguished Service Award in 1955 and the American Gastroenterological Association's Friedenwald Medal in 1956. He served as president of the American College of Surgeons, chaired the surgical division of the American Medical Association, and co-founded the American Board of Surgery. He was also a founding member of the World Medical Association.

Balfour held honorary fellowships of various international surgical colleges—the Royal College of Surgeons of England, Royal College of Surgeons of Edinburgh, Royal Australasian College of Surgeons, and Royal College of Physicians and Surgeons of Canada—as well as the Royal Society of Medicine and the Académie Nationale de Médecine. Throughout his career he was awarded honorary degrees from the University of Toronto, Northwestern University, McMaster University, Carleton College and St. Olaf College.
