= List of tallest buildings in Rochester, Minnesota =

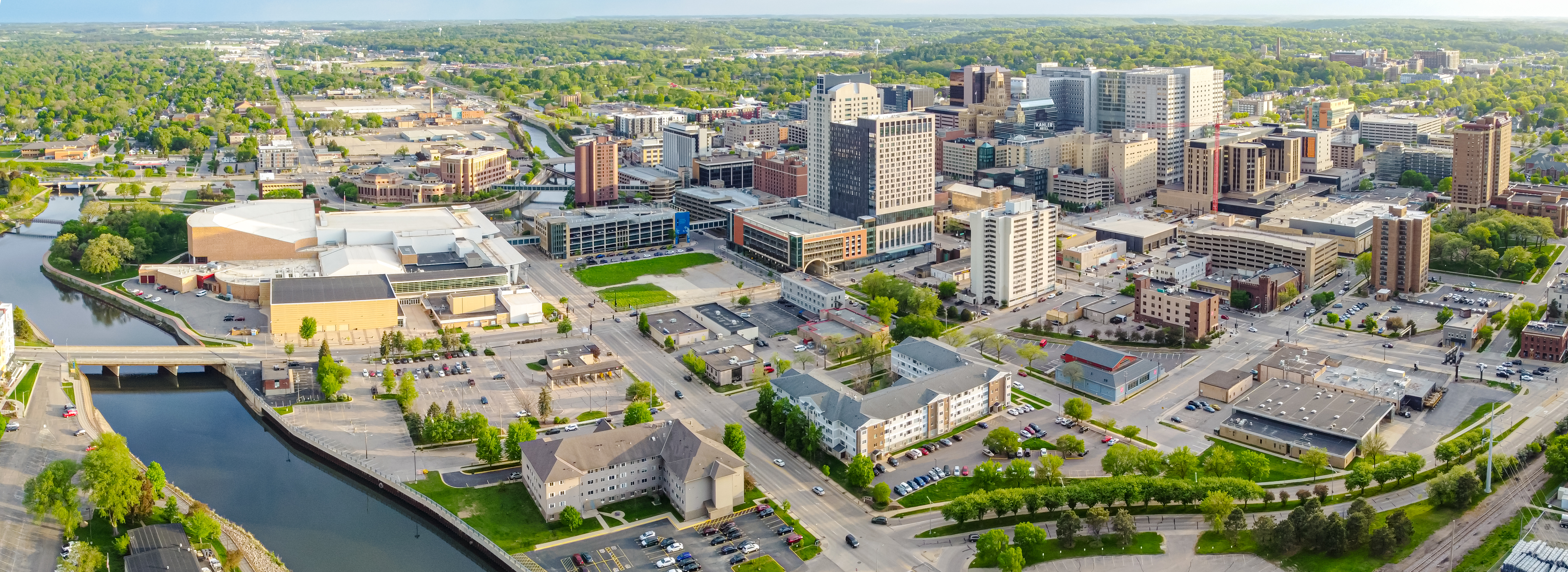
Rochester Minnesota Skyline

Rochester, Minnesota, has some of the tallest buildings for a city of its size, including the Broadway Plaza, which upon completion was the tallest residential building in a U.S. city with a metro area of less than 200,000.

== Tallest buildings ==
Rank	Name	Image	Height ft / (m)	Floors (Stories)	Year Completed
1	Broadway Plaza		342 / 104	29	2004
2	Gonda Building		305 / 93	21	2001
3	Plummer Building		298 / 91	19	1928
4	Mayo Building		295 / 90	20	1955, expanded 1970
5	Hilton Rochester Mayo Clinic		295 / 81	20	2019
6	Guggenheim Building		258 / 78	21	1974
7	Siebens Building		220 / 67	14	1989
8	Stabile Building		211 / 64	13	2006
9	Center Plaza (Hotel Indigo)		190 / 58	16	1969, renovated 2019
10	Kellen Building		174 / 53	11	2023
11	Eisenberg Building		169 / 52	12	1966
12	The Berkman		168 / 52	13	2020
13	Charlton Building		163 / 50	10	
14	The Kahler Grand Hotel		154 / 47	12	1921
15	Minnesota Bio Business Center		130 / 40	8	2009

=== Buildings with Unknown Heights ===
Rank	Name	Image		Floors (Stories)	Year Completed
1	Charter House		290 ft	22	1984
2	Fontaine Towers			17	1984
3	Park Towers			16	1973
4	Central Towers			14	1987
5	Rochester Towers			13	1966
6	Madonna Towers			12	1967
7	DoubleTree Hotel			11	1989
8	St. Mary's Hospital			11	1889-2019 (near continuous construction, future additions planned)
9	Rochester Marriott Mayo Clinic			9	1989
10	US Bank Building			9	1989
11	Kahler Inn & Suites			9	1979
12	Condominiums of Buena Vista			9	
13	Best Western Soldiers Tower			8	1988
14	Dan Abraham Healthy Living Center			7	2014

== Tallest under construction, approved, and proposed ==
Civic Center North Tower	15	2028	Under construction
Michael's site mixed-use tower	14	2028	Proposed
Citywalk Apartments	12	2026	Approved
Waterman Building	9	2030	Under Construction. 9 story building, 221 feet tall upon completion, with capacity to be expanded to 420 feet in future expansions.
The 324 Apartments	6	2020	Under construction
Minnesota BioBusiness Center Phase II	14	TBA	planned

== Tallest cancelled ==
Name	Height ft / m	Floors	Year	Notes
Rochester Time Square	425 / 130	35	1998	Originally approved in 2000, but the Broadway Plaza was later preferred by the city council.
CommonBond Tower	160 / 48	14	2023	8 Story residential originally planned atop 6 levels of parking. Parking garage completed in 2019. The residential portion was cancelled after being found insufficiently structurally supported by existing parking component

== Sources ==
- "Rochester". Emporis. Archived from the original on February 10, 2007.
