= Gonda Building =

Hospital Building at Mayo Clinic

Leslie & Susan Gonda Building
- Gonda
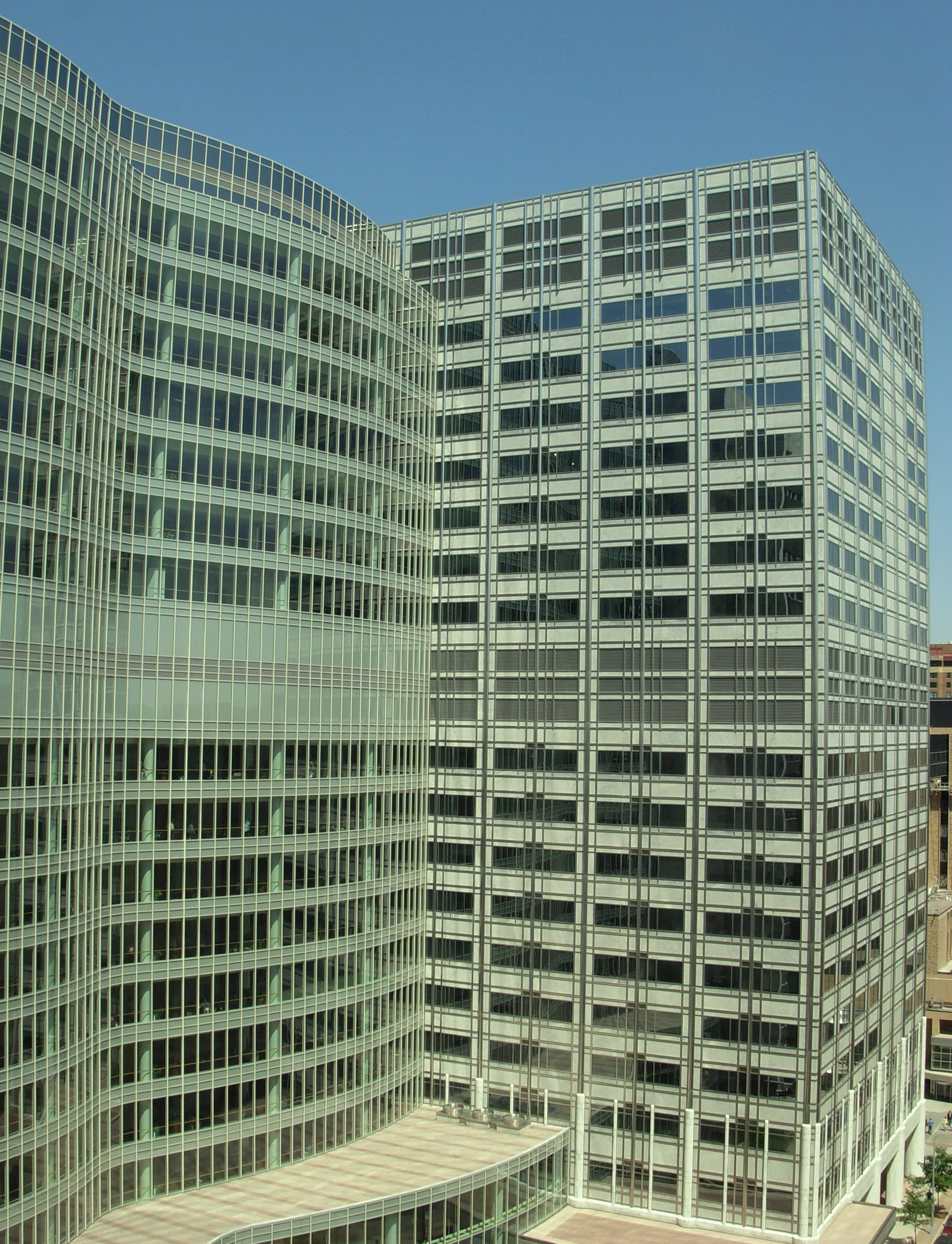
- The Mayo Clinic Gonda Building as seen from the nearby Plummer Building
- Interactive map of the Leslie & Susan Gonda Building area

General information
- Architectural style: Modern
- Location: Rochester, Minnesota
- Coordinates: 44.0230195°N 92.4665657°W
- Completed: 2001

Height
- Height: 305 ft (93 m)

Technical details
- Floor count: 21 stories
- Floor area: 1,499,983 sq ft (139,353.0 m^{2})

Design and construction
- Architect: Ellerbe Becket
- Structural engineer: Ellerbe Becket
- Main contractor: Mayo Clinic/Centex Rodgers

Other information
- Public transit access: RPT

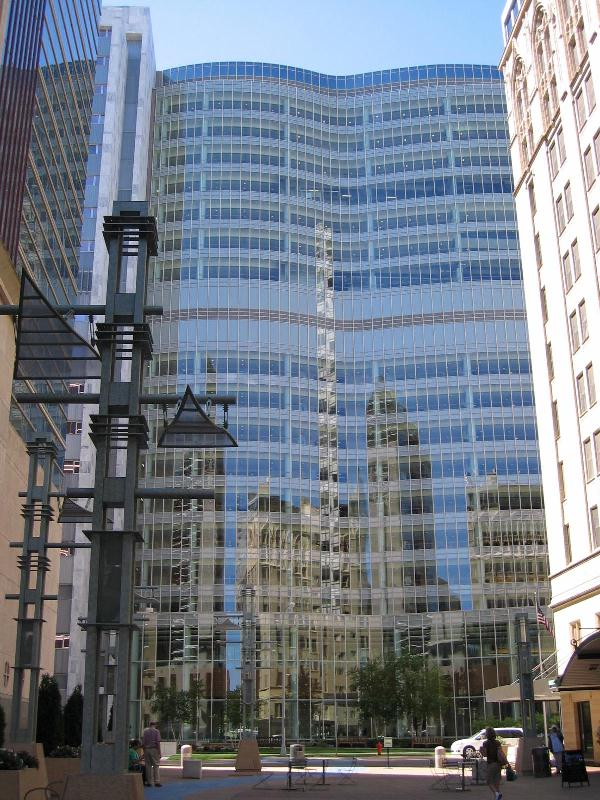
The Mayo Clinic's Gonda Building as seen from the newly renovated Peace Plaza in downtown Rochester, Minnesota

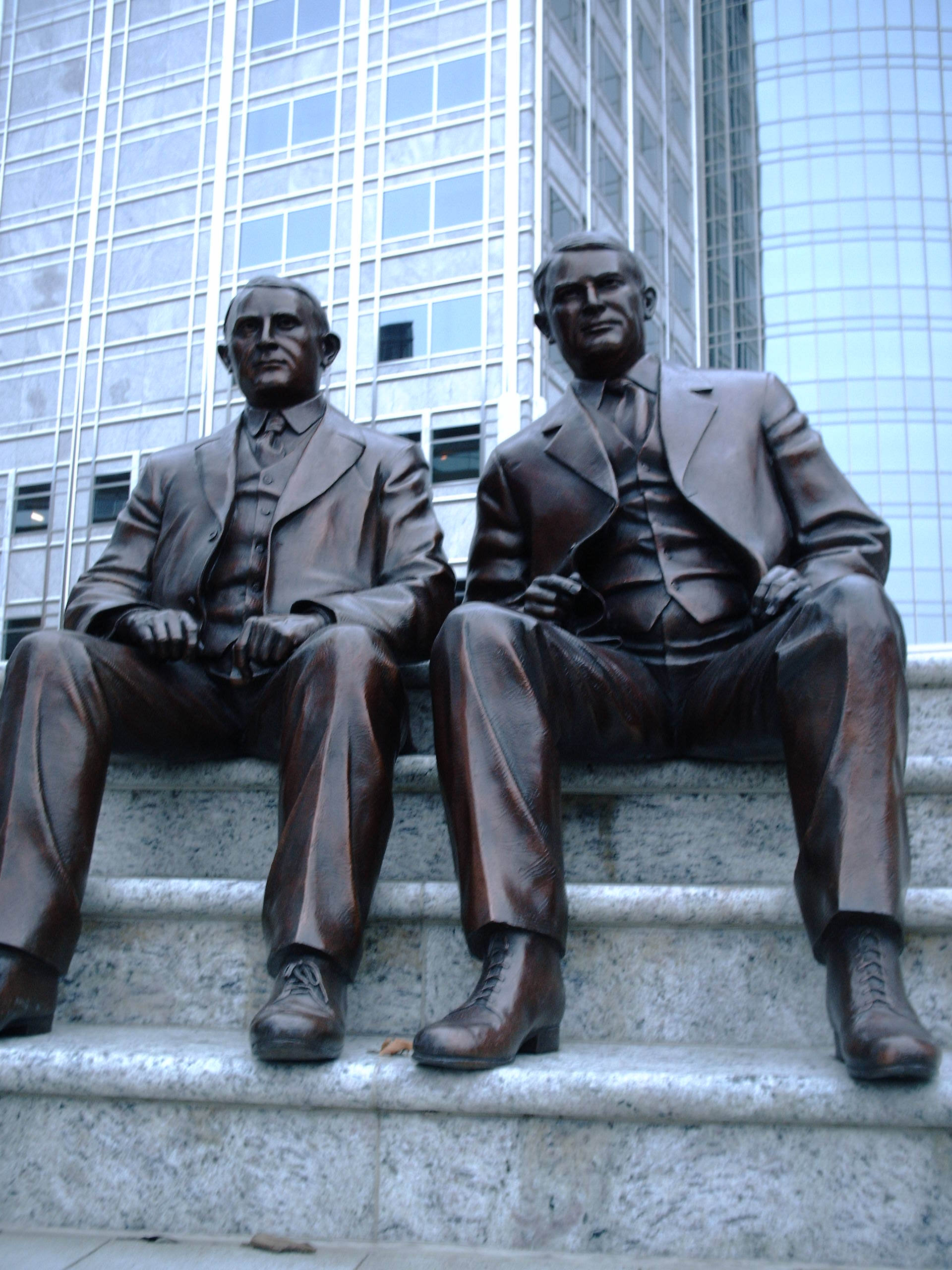
Statues of the Mayo brothers, "Dr. Will" and "Dr. Charlie", with the Gonda Building rising behind them

The Gonda Building is a medical building owned by the Mayo Clinic in Rochester, Minnesota, and designed by Pelli Clarke Architects (formerly Cesar Pelli & Associate) and Ellerbe Becket Architects and Engineers.

It rises 305 feet (93 m) in 21 floors, and was completed in 2001. At the time it was the tallest building in Rochester, and was surpassed in 2004 by Broadway Plaza.

The Gonda building was the largest building project in the Mayo Clinic's history, the Leslie & Susan Gonda Building was constructed in three phases to a height of 21 stories. A fourth phase is planned for completion in the 2020s. Located at the heart of the campus, Gonda is the centerpiece of Mayo's integrated practice. The outside of the Gonda building displays Brazilian white granite.

In 2018, the Mayo Clinic announced a $190 million expansion of the Gonda Building which will add 11 stories to its height, including four new floors of clinical space and a seven-story hotel expected to be completed in 2022, bringing its expected total height to nearly 500 feet, making it again- by far- the tallest building in the city. However, in the midst of the COVID-19 pandemic, the Mayo Clinic and developer Pontiac Land Group placed the project on indefinite hold.

The Gonda Building is physically conjoined on its South side to the Mayo Building although the floors do not match perfectly.

== See also ==
- List of tallest buildings in Minnesota
- List of tallest buildings in Rochester, Minnesota
