= Mayo Clinic =

American academic medical center

- Formation: January 27, 1864; 162 years ago Rochester, Minnesota, U.S.
- Location(s): Rochester, Minnesota; 44°1′20″N 92°28′0″W
- Region served: United States; Phoenix/Scottsdale, Arizona; Jacksonville, Florida; United Kingdom; London
- Key people: Gianrico Farrugia (CEO) Richard K. Davis (Chairman)
- Revenue: ▲US$16.3 billion (2022)
- Staff: 76,000
- Website: mayoclinic.org

Mayo Clinic (/ˈmeɪoʊ/ MAY-oh) is a private American academic medical center focused on integrated healthcare, education, and research. It maintains three major campuses, in Rochester, Minnesota; Jacksonville, Florida; and Phoenix/Scottsdale, Arizona.

Mayo Clinic employs more than 7,300 physicians and scientists, alongside 66,000 more administrative and allied health staff. The practice specializes in treating difficult cases through tertiary care and destination medicine. It is home to the top-15 ranked Mayo Clinic Alix School of Medicine in addition to many of the highest regarded residency education programs in the United States. It spends more than $660 million a year on research and employs more than 3,000 full-time research personnel.

William Worrall Mayo settled his family in Rochester in 1864 and opened a sole proprietorship medical practice that evolved under his sons, Will and Charlie Mayo, along with practice partners Stinchfield, Graham, Plummer, Millet, Judd, and Balfour, into Mayo Clinic. Today, in addition to the hospital in Rochester, Mayo Clinic owns and runs major campuses in Arizona and Florida. Most recently, in 2020, the Mayo Clinic bought a facility in central London, England. Mayo Clinic Health System also operates affiliated facilities throughout Minnesota, Wisconsin, and Iowa.

Mayo Clinic has been ranked number one in the United States for eight consecutive years in U.S. News & World Report's Best Hospitals Honor Roll, maintaining a position at or near the top for more than 35 years. It has been on the list of "100 Best Companies to Work For" published by Fortune magazine for fourteen consecutive years and has continued to achieve this ranking through 2017. Drawing in patients from around the globe, Mayo Clinic performs near the highest number of transplants in the country, including both solid organ and hematologic transplantation.

== Operations ==
Mayo Clinic is a nonprofit hospital system with campuses in Rochester, Minnesota; Scottsdale and Phoenix, Arizona; and Jacksonville, Florida. Mayo Clinic employs 76,000 people, including more than 7,300 physicians and clinical residents and more than 66,000 allied health staff, as of 2022. Additionally, Mayo Clinic partially owns and operates Mayo Clinic Health System, which consists of more than 70 hospitals and clinics across Minnesota, Iowa, and Wisconsin. Mayo Clinic also operates the Mayo Clinic College of Medicine and Science, a nonprofit college dedicated to training medical and allied health professionals at Mayo Hospitals in Minnesota, Arizona, and Florida.

The clinic was established as an independent business subsidiary in London in partnership with Oxford University Clinic, a collaboration between the University of Oxford and Oxford University Hospitals NHS Foundation Trust, to operate a clinic starting in 2019.

Currently, Mayo Clinic is led by president and CEO Gianrico Farrugia, M.D. John H. Noseworthy, M.D., retired as president and CEO in December 2018; his predecessor, Denis A. Cortese, M.D., retired in November 2009. Richard K. Davis, former Executive Chairman and President of U.S. Bancorp, serves as the chair of Mayo's governing board of trustees.

=== Clinical practice ===
In 2022, more than 1.3 million different patients from all 50 US states and 138 other countries were seen at Mayo Clinic facilities.

=== Research ===
Mayo Clinic researchers contribute to understanding disease processes, best clinical practices, and translating findings from the laboratory to clinical practice. As of 2022, research personnel included about 5,500 physicians and scientists. Mayo Clinic's 2022 research funding exceeded $1 billion. These research initiatives led to 9,275 research publications and review articles in peer-reviewed journals.

As a result of these studies, Mayo Clinic Press publishes their findings in self-help books targeted to the general public. A handful of these books have made their way onto New York Times bestseller lists, including the number one NYT bestseller, Mayo Clinic Diet (1st, 2nd, and 3rd editions). Other notable bestsellers include Heal Your Gut, Save Your Brain by Partha Nandi, M.D., F.A.C.P., Mayo Clinic Guide to a Healthy Pregnancy by Myra Wick, M.D., Ph.D., Cook Smart, Eat Well by Jennifer Welper, Mayo Clinic Guide to Better Vision, Third Edition by Sophie J. Bakri, M.D., Mayo Clinic on Prostate Health, 3rd Edition by Derek J. Lomas, M.D. and Paras H. Shah, M.D., and Live Younger Longer by Stephen L. Kopecky, M.D.

=== Education ===
The Mayo Clinic College of Medicine and Science (MCCMS), established in 1915, offers educational programs embedded in Mayo Clinic's clinical practice and biomedical research activities. MCCMS consists of five accredited schools:

- Mayo Clinic Alix School of Medicine provides training for medical students pursuing a medical degree (M.D.).
- Mayo Clinic School of Graduate Medical Education, established in 1915, offers more than 300 residences and fellowships in all medical and surgical specialties with 1,791 active trainees.
- Mayo Clinic School of Health Sciences provides training in 60 health sciences career fields.
- Mayo Clinic School of Continuous Professional Development provides continuing education for practicing medical professionals.
- Mayo Clinic Graduate School of Biomedical Sciences is for graduate students (master's degree, M.D.-Ph.D., or Ph.D.) pursuing biomedical research training.

== History ==
The Mayos

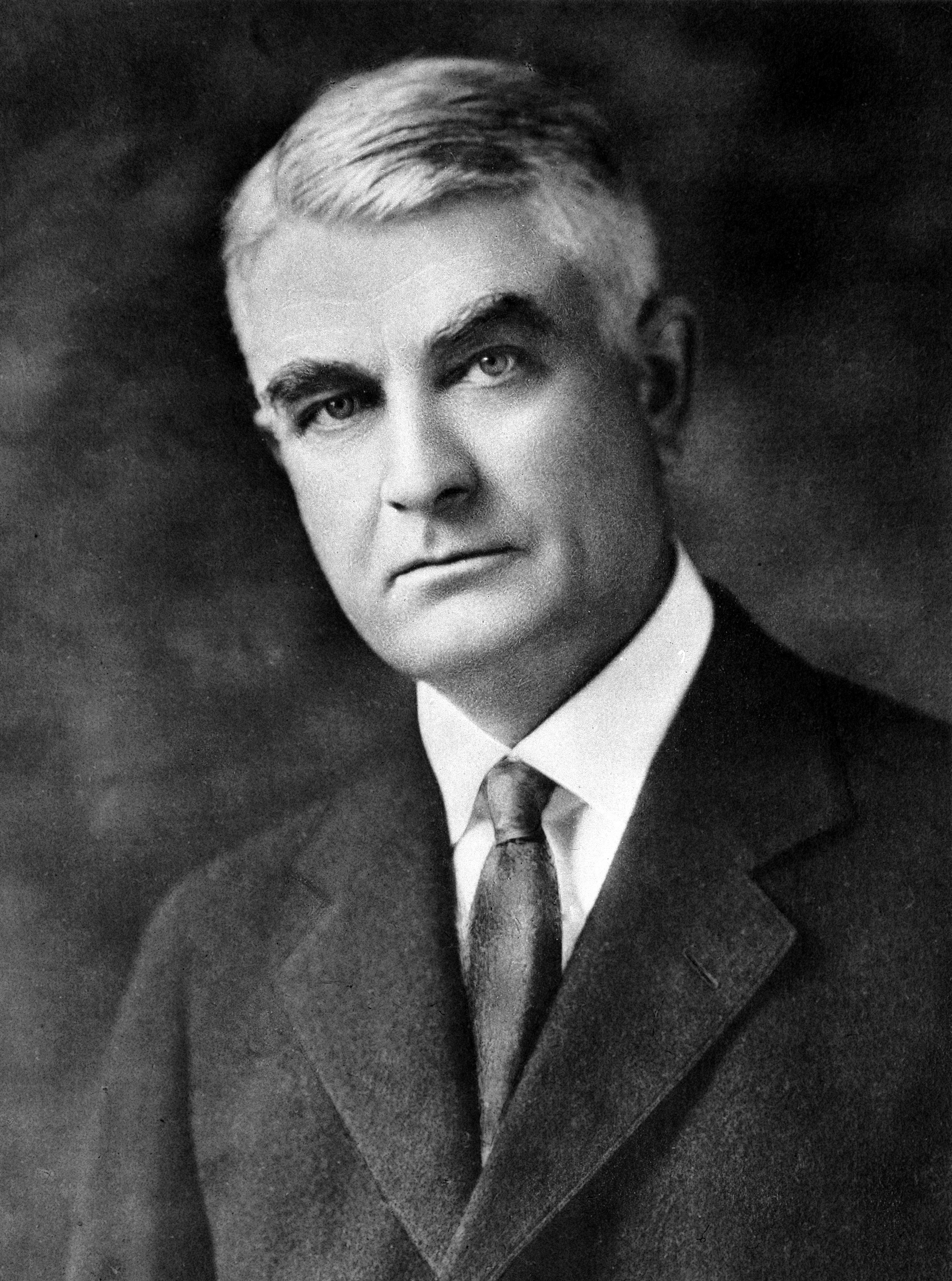
William James Mayo

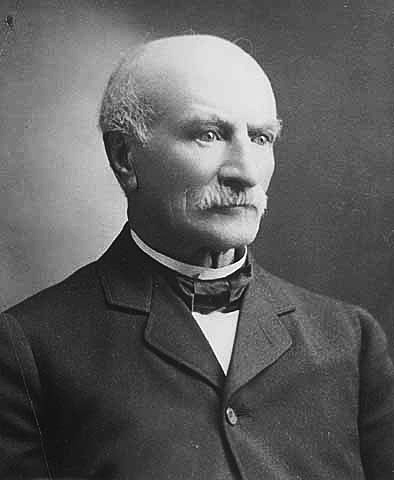
William Worrall Mayo

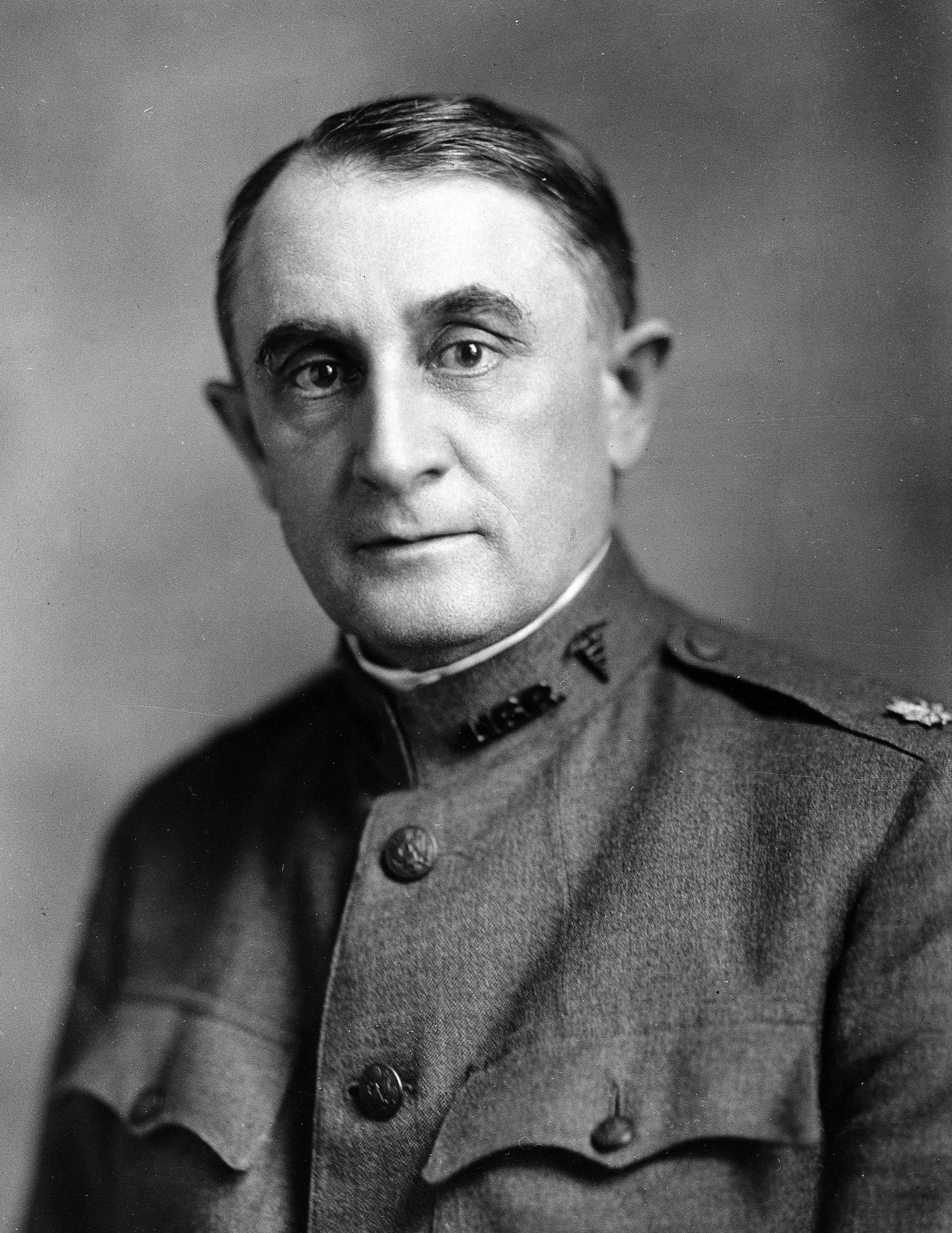
Charles Horace Mayo

=== Early years ===
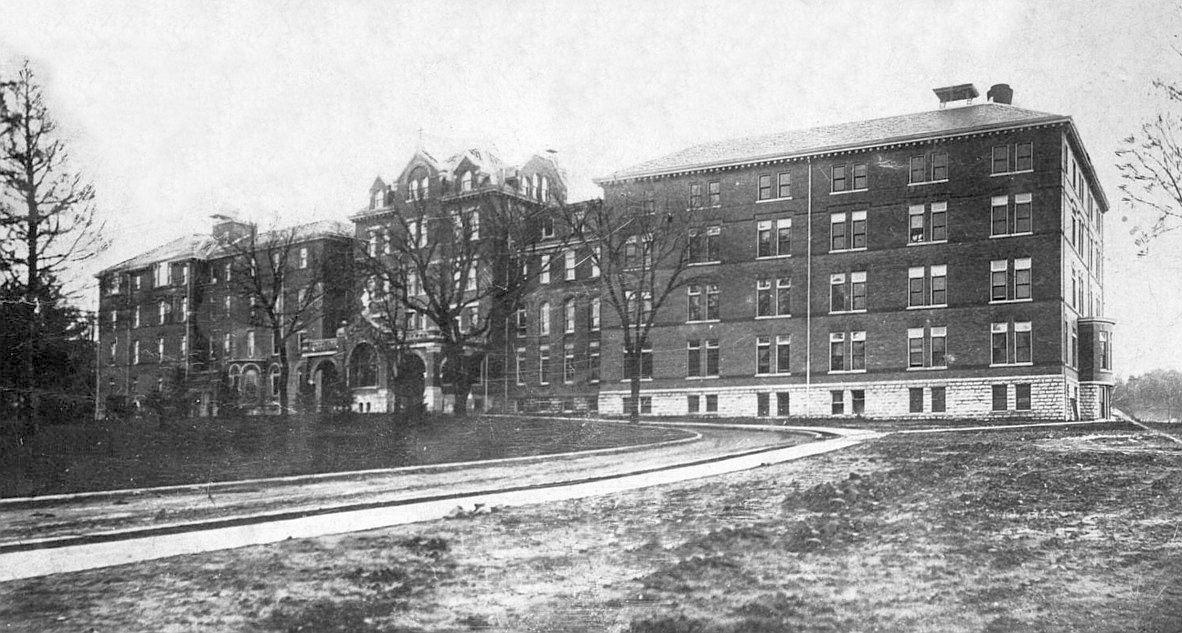
St. Mary's Hospital in 1910

Mayo Clinic originated with the medical practice of William Worrall Mayo, M.D. (1819–1911). Born near Manchester, England, he was mentored by the eminent British scientist John Dalton and migrated to the United States in 1846. He worked his way west, earning two medical degrees at a time when formal education for physicians was limited. Mayo settled in Indiana, and he married Louise Abigail Wright in 1851. They moved to Minnesota Territory in 1854, seeking a more healthful climate. The family relocated within Minnesota several times until Mayo's appointment as an examining surgeon for the Union Army military draft board during the American Civil War brought them to Rochester. On January 27, 1864, Mayo advertised in the Rochester City Post the opening of a private medical practice "over the Union Drug Store on Third Street" with "all calls answered by day or night".

Both of W. W. Mayo's sons, William James Mayo (1861–1939) and Charles Horace Mayo (1865–1939), who became known as Dr. Will and Dr. Charlie, grew up in Rochester and attended medical school. William graduated in 1883 and joined his father's practice, with Charles joining in 1888. On August 21, 1883, a tornado struck Rochester, causing at least 37 deaths and more than 200 injuries. One-third of the town was destroyed, but the Mayo family escaped serious harm. Relief efforts began immediately in a variety of makeshift facilities. Mayo was placed in charge of organizing medical care for the wounded survivors. Needing nurses, he reached out to Mother Alfred Moes, the founder of the Sisters of Saint Francis of Rochester, Minnesota (a teaching order).

After the crisis subsided, Mother Alfred approached W. W. Mayo with a proposal: The Sisters of St. Francis would raise funds to build a hospital in Rochester if he and his sons provided medical and surgical care. The agreement was made over a handshake. On September 30, 1889, Saint Mary's Hospital was opened by the Sisters with the three Mayo physicians on staff.

=== Group practice ===
The growing specialization of medicine and the expanding use of railroads, automobiles, and mass communications provided context for the development of integrated multi-specialty practice.

Starting in the 1890s, the Mayo brothers welcomed other physicians to join them. W. W. Mayo's solo practice had evolved into a family practice with his sons' participation, which then became a group practice with other medical colleagues. Mayo Clinic's first partners were physicians Augustus W. Stinchfield, Christopher Graham, Melvin C. Millet, Henry Plummer, E. Star Judd, and Donald Balfour.

Preeminent among the early physicians who joined the practice was Henry Stanley Plummer, M.D. A specialist in thyroid disease, he made contributions to the treatment of goiter. In terms of organizational development, he collaborated with the Mayo brothers in coordinating the introduction of specialties that expanded the scope of the Mayo practice beyond its origins in surgery. A polymath whose interests included architecture, engineering, and art, Plummer also created many of the systems and procedures that remain central to Mayo Clinic today, such as the integrated "dossier" medical record.

=== Growth and national expansion ===
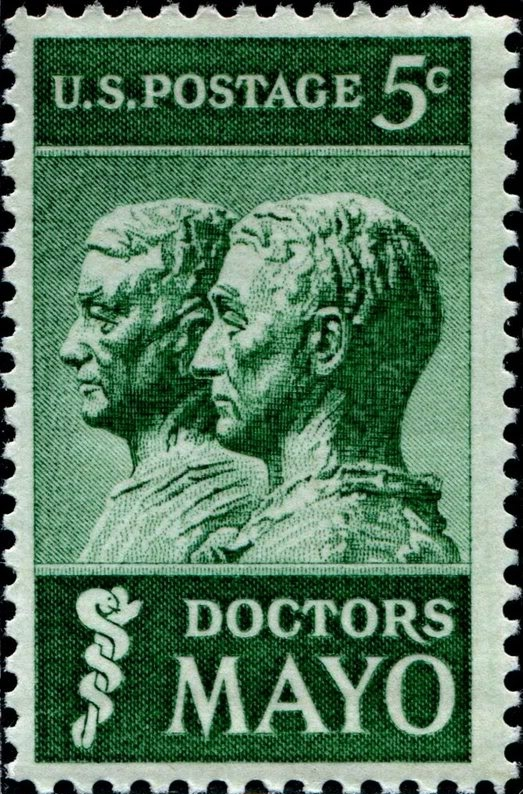
Mayo Brothers U.S. Commemorative Stamp issued 1964

The Mayo brothers both served as presidents of the American Medical Association and achieved recognition as surgeons. In 1919, the brothers and their wives donated the assets of the medical practice, including land, buildings, and equipment, as well as the majority of their life savings, to transform the private partnership into a not-for-profit organization.

Following World War II, Mayo Clinic continued to expand in Rochester, Minnesota. In 1972, the Mayo Medical School (now Mayo Clinic Alix School of Medicine) opened.

In 1986, Mayo Clinic formally united with Saint Mary's Hospital and Rochester Methodist Hospital. That same year, Mayo Clinic expanded to Florida partly because of a donation of 400 acres of land in Jacksonville from the Davis family. This was followed by expansion to Scottsdale, Arizona, in 1987; the Phoenix, Arizona, campus opened in 1998. In 1992, Mayo Clinic Health System became operational as a network of community-based medical services in Minnesota, Iowa, and Wisconsin. In 2011, Mayo Clinic launched the Mayo Clinic Care Network, a collection of facilities with access to Mayo Clinic protocols and experts.

In November 2019, the Mayo Clinic, in a joint partnership with SEHA Abu Dhabi Health Services Co, invested $50 million into a 741-bed hospital in the United Arab Emirates for a 25% stake.

At the beginning of 2020, the Mayo Clinic opened a health clinic in central London, in partnership with Oxford University Clinic. It was officially named Mayo Clinic Healthcare. In July 2020, it was reported that the Mayo Clinic had bought Oxford University Clinic's share of the facility, to become the sole owner and its first overseas clinic operated as a Mayo Clinic entity.

=== Contributions to medicine and science ===
In the early 20th century, Henry Plummer developed Mayo Clinic's multi-specialty group practice model and an integrated medical record system. Plummer's system enabled physicians to share patient information better. Before Plummer's system, physicians worked solo. They shared patient information when necessary, either verbally or by letter. Plummer also helped design and fabricate building systems innovations, including steam sterilization rooms, metal surgical tools and equipment, pneumatic tube systems, and knee-operated sinks. In 1905, Mayo Clinic advanced a technique of using frozen tissue during surgery to determine if a patient had cancer while the patient was still in the operating room. Mayo Clinic offered the first graduate medical education program in 1915 and the first nonprofit practice aligned with medical education and research. In the 1920s, Albert Compton Broders of the Mayo Clinic created the first index to grade tumors. Mayo Clinic opened the first hospital-based blood bank in Rochester in 1935. Early in Mayo Clinic's history, the hospital designed the one-legged mobile instrument stand known as the Mayo stand.

In the 1930s, Mayo Clinic associates Walter M. Boothby, Randolph Lovelace, and Arthur H. Bulbulian developed a high-altitude oxygen therapy mask known as the BLB flight mask.

During World War II, the U.S. Army tasked Mayo Clinic with finding a solution for pilots dying after suffering blackouts. Mayo Clinic hired a team of physicians to research and define the specific physiologic effects causing blackout and unconsciousness during high G forces. Physiologists Earl H. Wood, Edward Baldes, Charles Code, and Edward H. Lambert developed the G-suit with air bladders that prevented blood from pooling in pilots' legs. The suit was worn by U.S. pilots toward the end of World War II.

Two Mayo Clinic physicians were among three people awarded the Nobel Prize in medicine in 1950 for the discovery of cortisone. Professor Edward C. Kendall, Ph.D., and Philip S. Hench of Mayo Clinic were jointly awarded the Nobel Prize in medicine alongside Tadeus Reichstein, a Swiss chemist who conducted independent research, for the discovery. They separated and identified compounds from the adrenal cortex that produced cortisone and hydrocortisone. Later in the decade, Mayo Clinic began using and refining the Gibbon heart–lung machine in cardiac surgery. It is now known as the Mayo–Gibbon heart–lung machine.

Mayo Clinic associates Edward Howard Lambert, Lealdes (Lee) McKendree Eaton, and Edward Douglas Rooke were the first physicians to substantially describe the clinic and electrophysiological findings of what is known as Lambert–Eaton myasthenic syndrome in 1956. In 1972, the clustering of LEMS with other autoimmune diseases led to the hypothesis that it was caused by autoimmunity.

In 1969, Mayo Clinic doctors performed the first Food and Drug Administration-approved hip replacement in the United States. In 1973, Mayo Clinic bought the first CT scanner in the U.S.

Mayo Clinic and Roche Molecular Biochemicals developed a rapid DNA test in 2001 to detect anthrax in humans and in the environment.

The Mayo Clinic Center for Innovation was established in 2008 and has since worked on more than 270 projects.

In 2013, Mayo Clinic specialists in regenerative medicine began the "first-in-human study", whereby patient cells are used to attempt to heal heart damage.

After several years of using Apple Inc.'s Macintosh computers and mobile devices for patient care and test results, Mayo partnered with Apple in 2014 to develop the Apple Health and HealthKit apps as a central location for personal health information. Mayo Clinic and Delos Living launched the Well Living Lab in September 2015. This research facility is designed to simulate real-world, non-hospital environments, allowing Mayo Clinic researchers to study the interaction between indoor spaces and human health.

Mayo Clinic's Advanced Care at Home Model of Care launched in 2020 and assists patients in their own homes through virtual care.

In 2020, Mayo Clinic began running a federally sponsored Expanded Access Program for Convalescent Plasma to treat hospitalized patients with COVID-19 in the United States.

In 2018, Mayo Clinic and UCLA used spinal cord stimulation and physical therapy that allowed a man paralyzed since 2013 to briefly regain his ability to stand and walk with assistance. The patient was able to walk 111 yards for a total of 16 minutes when given artificial electrical stimulation, although he was unable to continue that mobility once the artificial stimulation was removed. The results were published in the journal Nature Medicine.

As of 2023, Mayo Clinic had treated more than 10,000 patients with proton beam therapy across two of its facilities. According to Post-Bulletin reporting, proton beam therapy is limited in the U.S., with only 2 percent of radiation patients being treated with the technology.

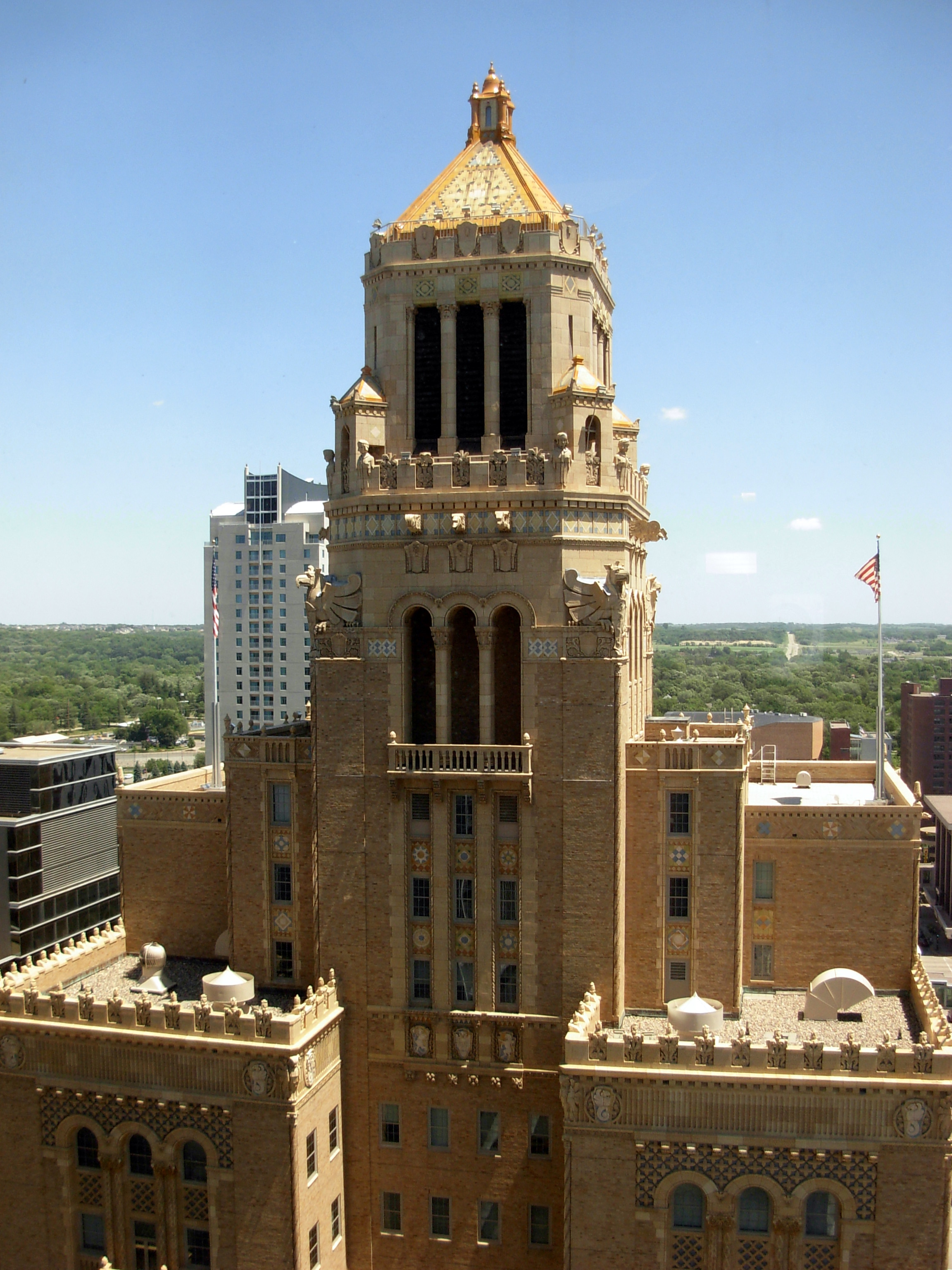
Plummer Building in Rochester, Minnesota

=== Architecture and art collection ===
As the practice grew in the 20th century, it required additional space. Saint Mary's Hospital underwent frequent expansion. Rochester business leader John Kahler built innovative hotel-hospital facilities that served Mayo Clinic patients. In 1914, Mayo Clinic opened the world's first building expressly designed for multispecialty group practice, known as the 1914 "red brick" building. It facilitated ease of movement for patients and staff among specialty areas, brought research and education functions into proximity with clinical practice, and patient amenities. This approach was replicated and enhanced with the adjoining 1928 Mayo Clinic building, later named for Plummer, its principal designer, which is listed on the National Register of Historic Places. The General hospital features bronze entry doors designed by artist Charles Brioschi. Each 16-foot-high (4.9 m), 5.25-inch-thick (13.3 cm) door weighs 4,000 pounds (1,800 kg) and features ornamental panels. The doors are closed to memorialize important historical events and influential people, such as the deaths of the Mayo brothers, the assassination of President John F. Kennedy, and the victims of the September 11, 2001, terrorist attacks. The 1914 "red brick" building, a National Historic Landmark, was demolished by Mayo Clinic in the 1980s to make way for the Siebens Building (completed in 1989). Mayo Clinic's campus has undergone expansion over the years.

Other notable Mayo Clinic buildings include the Mayo Building (Rochester, Minnesota) (construction completed in 1955), Guggenheim Building (1974), Gonda Building (2001), Opus Imaging Research Building (2007), and a recent addition in 2019 – the Discovery Square building.

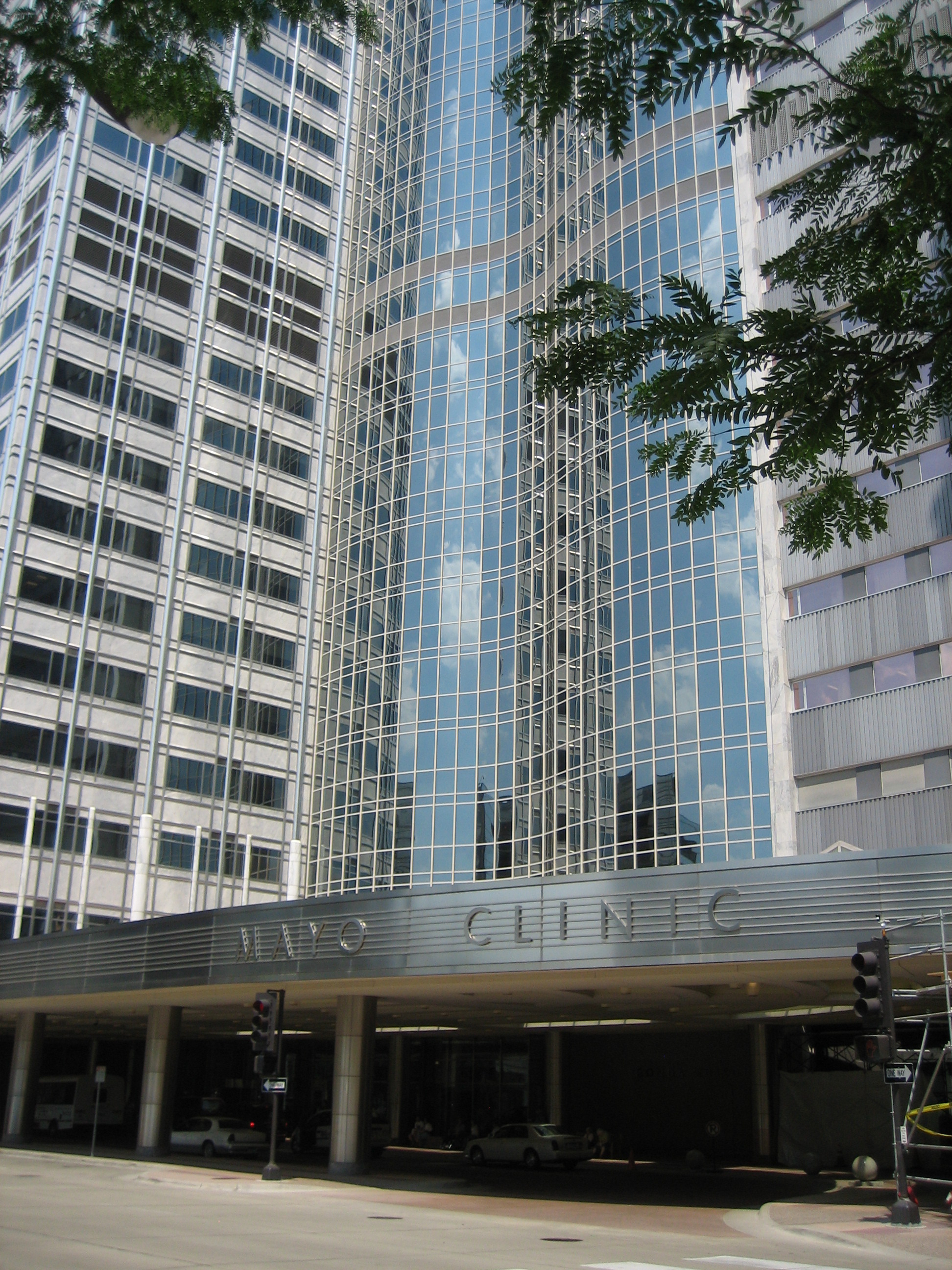
Gonda Building entrance

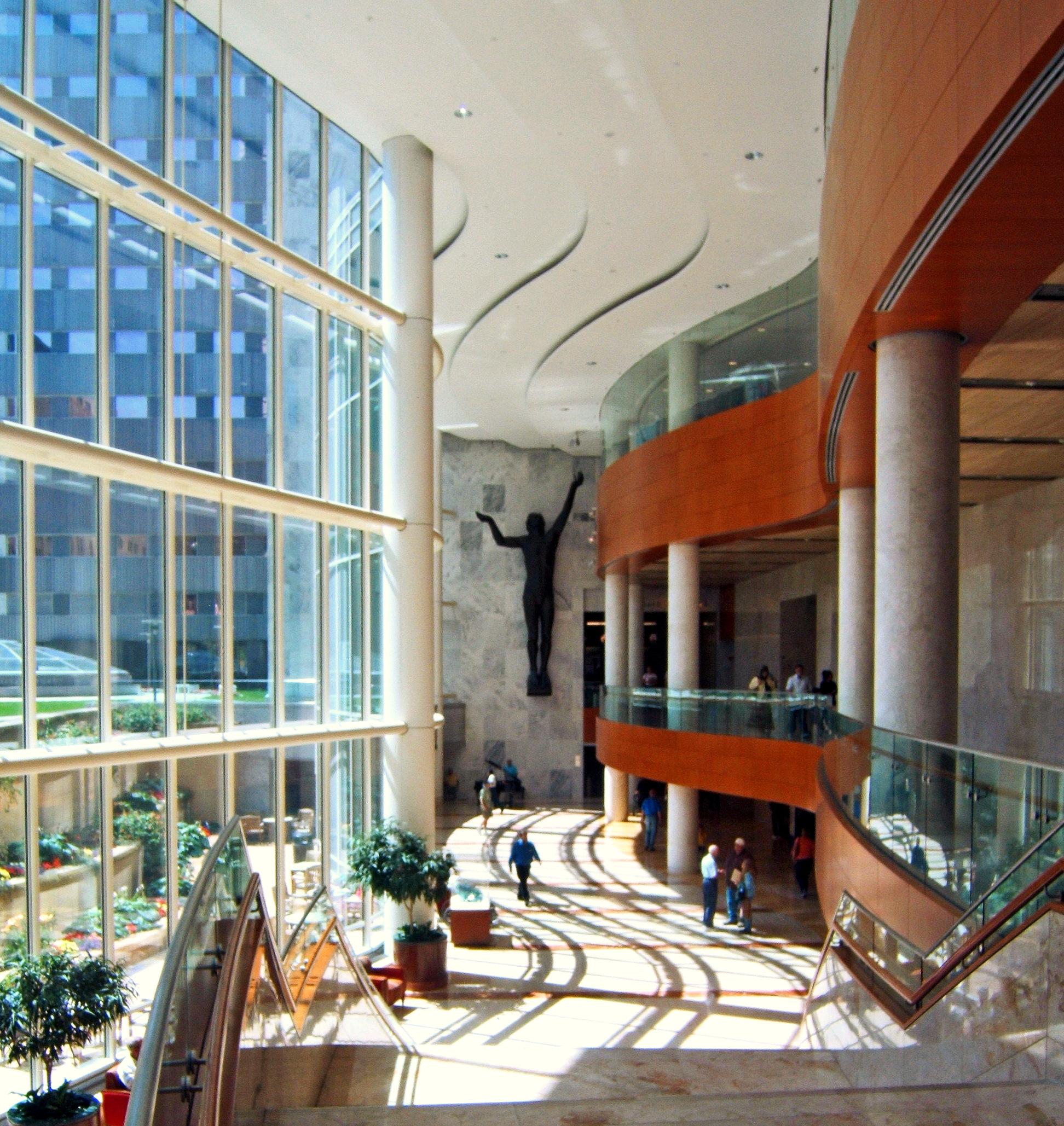
Gonda Building atrium

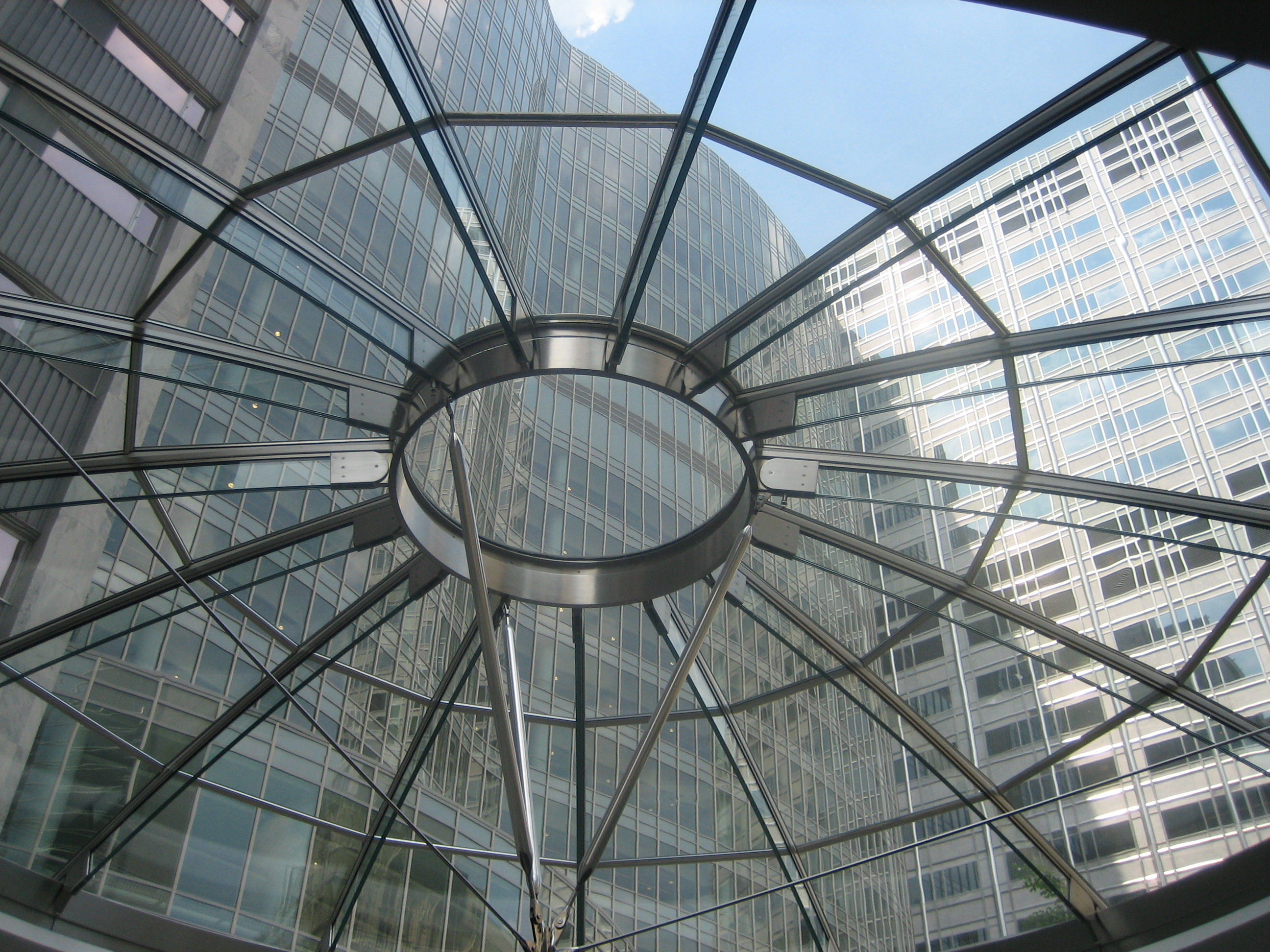
Patient cafeteria dome

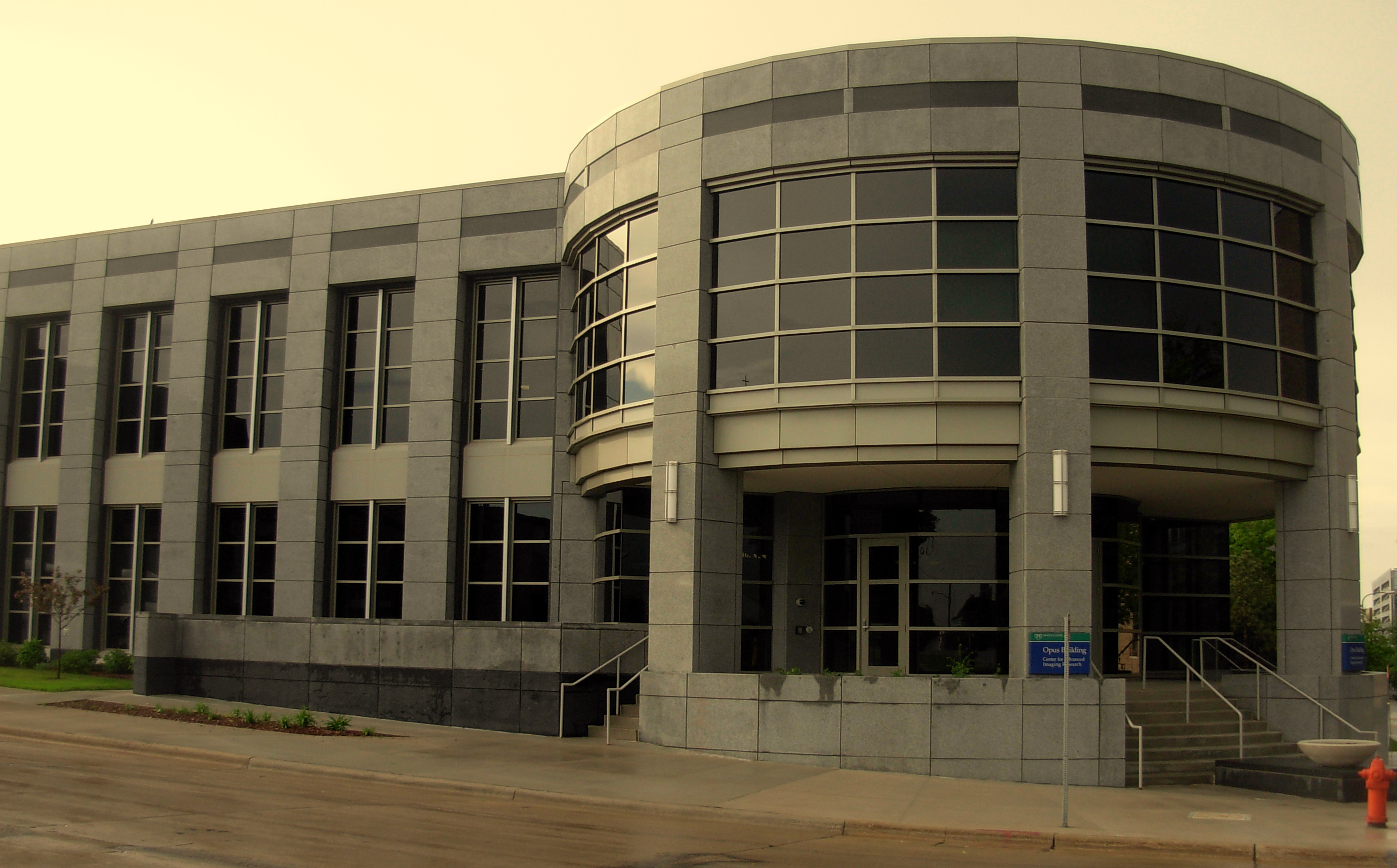
Opus Imaging Research Building

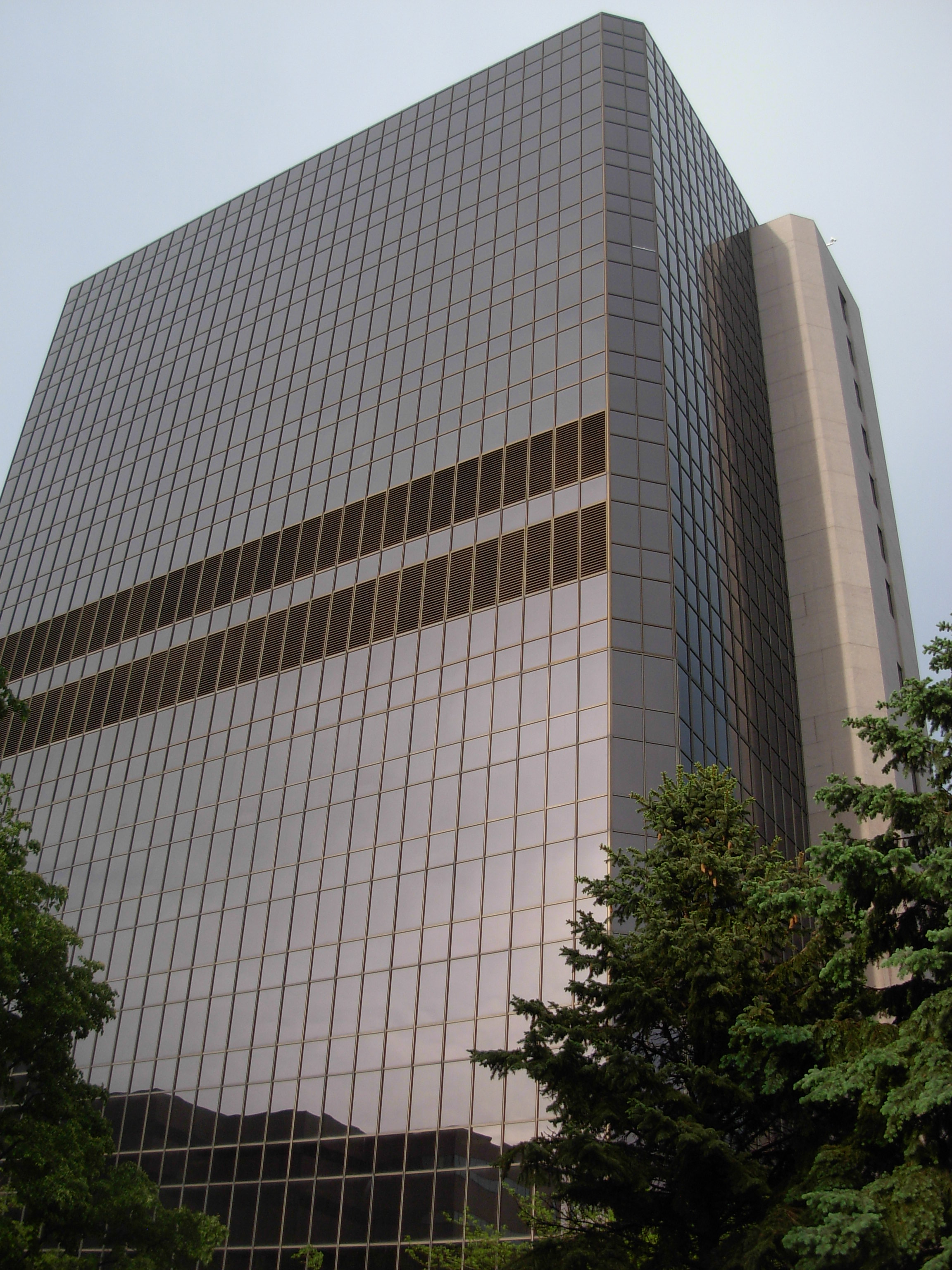
Guggenheim Building

Mayo Clinic's humanities program was founded on the belief that the arts and healing are linked. Over the decades, Mayo Clinic has established an extensive art collection, including these works on display across all campuses:

- Endangered Species by Andy Warhol
- John D'Aire by Auguste Rodin
- Fish by Alexander Calder
- Man and Freedom by Ivan Meštrović
- Untitled by Dale Chihuly
- Four Houses by Jennifer Bartlett
- The Archer by Joan Miró
- My Brother and I by Tuck Langland
- Constellation Earth by Paul Granlund

=== Educational programs ===
The first medical, educational programs at Mayo Clinic were developed in 1915 with the assistance of the University of Minnesota. Mayo Clinic School of Graduate Medical Education and the Mayo Foundation for Medical Education and Research were established in 1915. MFMER was established as a department of the University of Minnesota with a $1.5 million donation to offer graduate programs at the Mayo Clinic in Rochester. The Mayo Clinic School of Graduate Medical Education is part of the Mayo Clinic College of Medicine and Science, which is divided into five schools. Those schools include Mayo Clinic Alix School of Medicine, Mayo Clinic School of Health Sciences, Mayo Clinic School of Continuous Professional Development, and Mayo Clinic Graduate School of Biomedical Sciences.

In 2011, the foundation that oversees the Mayo Clinic went before the Supreme Court to argue that medical residents should remain exempt from Social Security deductions. In Mayo Foundation v. United States, the court sided with the Social Security Administration and required FICA to be deducted going forward.

=== Current practice ===
Mayo Clinic rules mandate that its CEOs must be physicians and come from within Mayo Clinic. John H. Noseworthy, M.D., served as president and CEO from 2009 to 2019. Under his leadership, Mayo Clinic was reorganized into a single operating company with a unified strategy and business plan, which helped the system expand. This included the launch of the Destination Medical Center, a 20-year economic growth plan in Rochester. During this time, annual revenue reached nearly $12 billion, and Mayo Clinic added 7,200 employees.

In 2018, Mayo Clinic announced that Gianrico Farrugia, M.D., a Mayo Clinic physician for more than 30 years, would replace Noseworthy as CEO. Farrugia had served as CEO of Mayo Clinic in Florida since 2015. The replacement adhered to Mayo Clinic's tradition of leadership changes, where a new president or CEO is named every seven to ten years. By 2018, Mayo Clinic doctors saw approximately 1.3 million patients annually.

== Criticism ==
=== Opposition to the "Keeping Nurses at the Bedside Act" ===
In May 2023, Mayo Clinic lobbied against two statewide health care bills, the Keeping Nurses at the Bedside Act (KNABA) and the Health Care Affordability Board, threatening to pull more than 4 billion dollars in investments into new facilities and infrastructure in the Mayo Clinic Rochester campus unless the Affordability Board bill was scrapped and the KNABA was amended to exempt Mayo Clinic from any staffing mandates. The KNABA required hospitals to establish committees that allowed nurses and other staff to evaluate staffing workloads in order to address a so-called "care crisis" and a shortage in hospital staff. The Health Care Affordability Board would allow hospitals, doctors, and insurers to be fined for failing to lower costs or allowing costs to run out of control. The Minnesota Nurses Association spoke out against Mayo's demands, characterizing them as "unethical" and "attempt(s) to override democracy". These lobbying attempts were successful, with the mandated nurse staffing levels scrapped and the Health Care Affordability Board legislation being changed from a board empowered to levy fines to a bill that "requires state health officials to review health care cost growth but gives them no authority to set targets". Minnesota state senator Erin Murphy called Mayo's efforts to gut the bill "corporate hijacking" in an op-ed published in the Star Tribune.

== Innovation ==
Mayo Clinic has adopted more than 15,000 mobile devices from Apple for patient care, including the iPad, iPad Mini, and iPhone. Mayo Clinic then created an app for these devices called Synthesis Mobile, which integrated hundreds of their health systems. More apps were developed for Mayo Clinic Care Network members to help patients see their medical records or ask clinicians for assistance. In 2014, Mayo Clinic was developing an app for Apple's HealthKit to help users maintain healthy lifestyles and warn of certain health signs that require attention.

The Mayo Clinic Center for Innovation was established in 2008. It has since worked on more than 270 projects.

In March 2018, Mayo Clinic and Mytonomy, a healthcare education system company, partnered to provide video content for cancer patients.

In September 2019, Mayo Clinic entered into a partnership with Google for healthcare innovation and cloud computing, and Google planned to open its facility in Rochester, Minnesota, for Mayo Clinic.

In January 2020, Mayo Clinic and NTT Venture Capital joined a $60 million financing for the biomedical software startup Inference.

In March 2023, Mayo Clinic disclosed that they are using generative AI technology to write content. The AI content is used to write in plain language, choose words that are inclusive, and optimize content for search applications.

== Rankings ==
Since 2016, the Mayo Clinic in Rochester has been ranked as the #1 overall hospital in the United States by U.S. News & World Report. Almost 5,000 hospitals were considered and ranked in 16 specialties, from cancer and heart disease to respiratory disorders and urology; 153 (slightly more than three percent of the total) were ranked in at least one of the 16 specialties. Of the 153 hospitals ranked in one or more specialties, 20 qualified for the Honor Roll, earning high scores in at least six specialties. Mayo Clinic, Rochester, was ranked in the top 10 in all but one of 16 specialties, in the top 4 in 13 specialties, and was the #1 ranked hospital in 8 of the 12 data-driven specialties. This year, U.S. News expanded its common procedures and conditions list to 9 individual measures. Mayo was one of fewer than 70 hospitals to score High Performing in every category. Additionally, Mayo was the only hospital on the 2016–2017 honor roll to receive 5 stars from CMS. Every Mayo Clinic hospital received an "A" safety rating from Leapfrog in its April 2017 report. In 2021–22, Mayo Clinic, Rochester, was ranked again as the #1 overall hospital in the United States by U.S. News & World Report.

Ranked 1st

- Diabetes and Endocrinology
- Gastroenterology
- Geriatrics
- Gynecology
- Nephrology
- Neurology and Neurosurgery
- Pulmonology
- Urology

Ranked 2nd

- Cardiology and Heart Surgery
- Ear, Nose and Throat
- Orthopedics

Ranked 3rd–6th

- Cancer (3rd)
- Rheumatology (4th)
- Psychiatry (5th)
- Rehabilitation (6th)

High-Performing

- Ophthalmology

== See also ==
- Mayo Clinic Arizona
- Mayo Clinic Cancer Center
- Mayo Clinic Florida
- Mayo Clinic Hospital (Rochester), Saint Marys Campus, Methodist Campus
