= Guggenheim Building =

Guggenheim
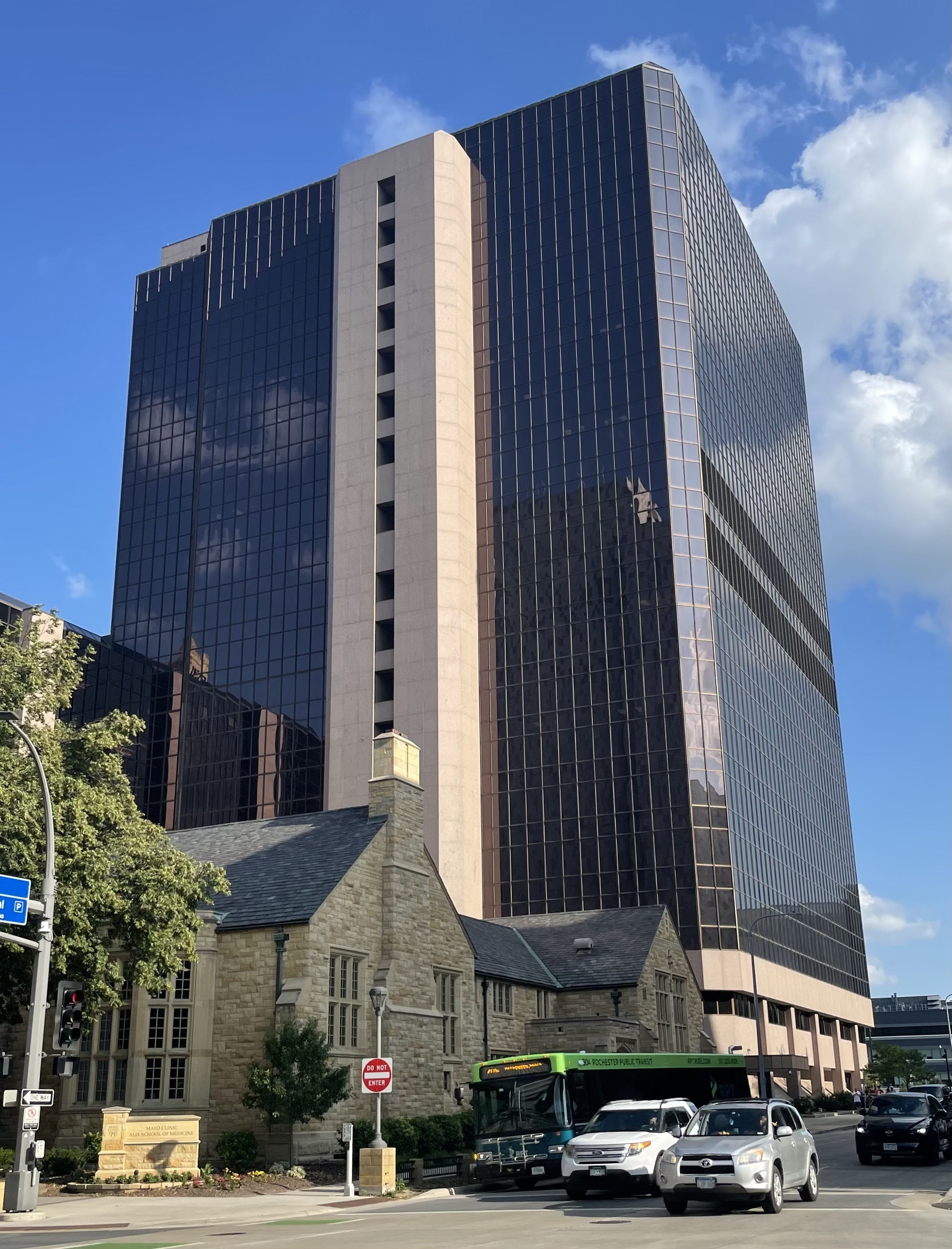
- The Guggenheim Building in July 2024
- Interactive map of the Guggenheim area

General information
- Architectural style: Modern
- Location: Rochester, Minnesota
- Coordinates: 44°01′15″N 92°28′01″W

Height
- Height: 258 ft (79 m)

Technical details
- Floor count: 21 stories

Design and construction
- Architecture firm: Ellerbe Associates
- Main contractor: Mayo Clinic

Other information
- Public transit access: RPT

The Guggenheim is a 20-story building in Rochester, Minnesota owned by Mayo Clinic. Many of the floors hold research labs. The building is connected to the subway system and physically conjoined with the Hilton Building. On the first floor there is a plaque for Philip Showalter Hench and Edward Calvin Kendall, the Mayo doctors who won a Nobel Prize for Physiology or Medicine.

== See also ==
- List of tallest buildings in Rochester, Minnesota
