= Plummer Building =

Part of the Mayo Clinic campus in Rochester, Minnesota, USA

Coordinates: 44°01′18″N 92°27′56″W

- U.S. National Register of Historic Places
- U.S. National Historic Landmark
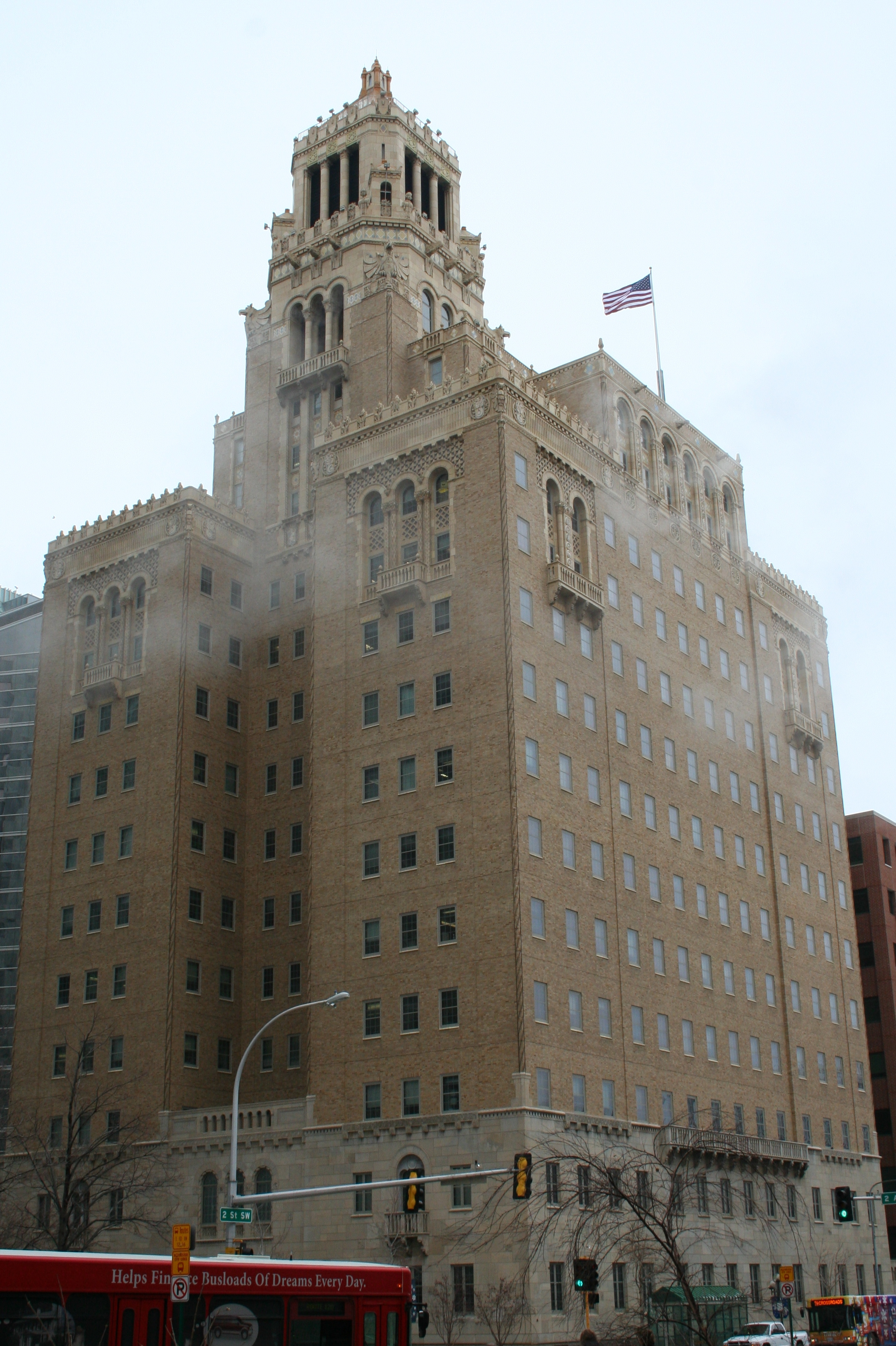
- The Plummer Building seen from the southwest in 2009

- Location within Minnesota Location within the United States
- Interactive map showing the Plummer Building
- Location: Rochester, Minnesota, US
- Built: 1928; 98 years ago
- NRHP reference No.: 69000075

Significant dates
- Added to NRHP: August 4, 1969
- Designated NHL: August 11, 1969

The Plummer Building in Rochester, Minnesota, is one of the many architecturally significant buildings on the Mayo Clinic campus. This new "Mayo Clinic" building, opened in 1928, added much needed space to the ever-expanding Mayo practice. The architect of record is Ellerbe & Co, now AECOM. It was the third building designed by the firm for the Mayo Clinic. The Mayo Clinic Buildings were listed on the U.S. National Register of Historic Places in 1969, and the Plummer Building was further designated as U.S. National Historic Landmark a week later, designated as Mayo Clinic Building.

== History ==
The Plummer Building was dedicated on September 16, 1928. Ten thousand people were in attendance for the event. The building was dedicated by Dr. Charles H. Mayo. The carillon was dedicated to the American Soldier by Dr. William J. Mayo:

"Today we dedicate this carillon to the American Soldier, in grateful memory of the heroic actions on land and sea to which America owes her liberty, peace and prosperity. We now give this carillon into the hands of the American Legion and other patriotic bodies who have maintained in the past and will maintain in the future the ideals of those noble men and women who founded the United States of America."

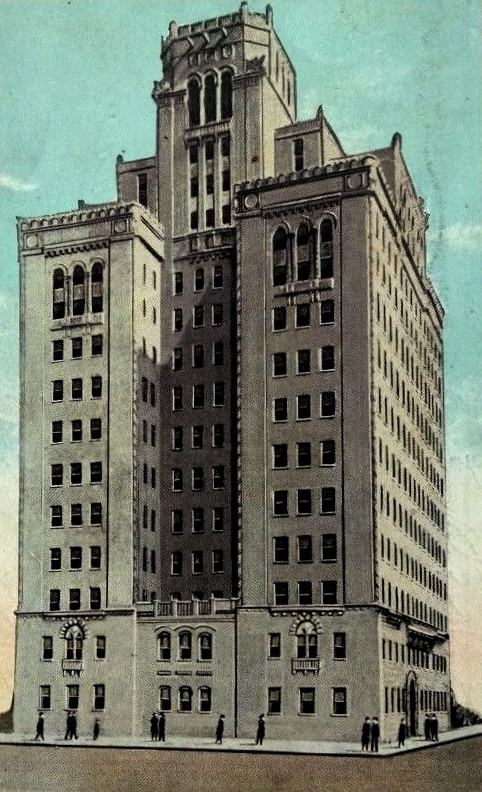
1922 postcard showing the building design before the addition of the bell tower.

The early design collaboration between Henry Stanley Plummer and Franklin Ellerbe established the model for future generations of new clinic and hospital buildings. The new 1928 Art Deco Mayo Clinic building was the physical manifestation of the early Mayo partners (Drs. Will and Charlie Mayo, Dr. Stinchfield, Dr. Graham, Dr. Judd, Dr. Henry Plummer, Dr. Millet, and Dr. Balfour) desire to create the first integrated private group practice.

When the building was complete it was the tallest building in Rochester until 2001 when the nearby Gonda Building was completed.

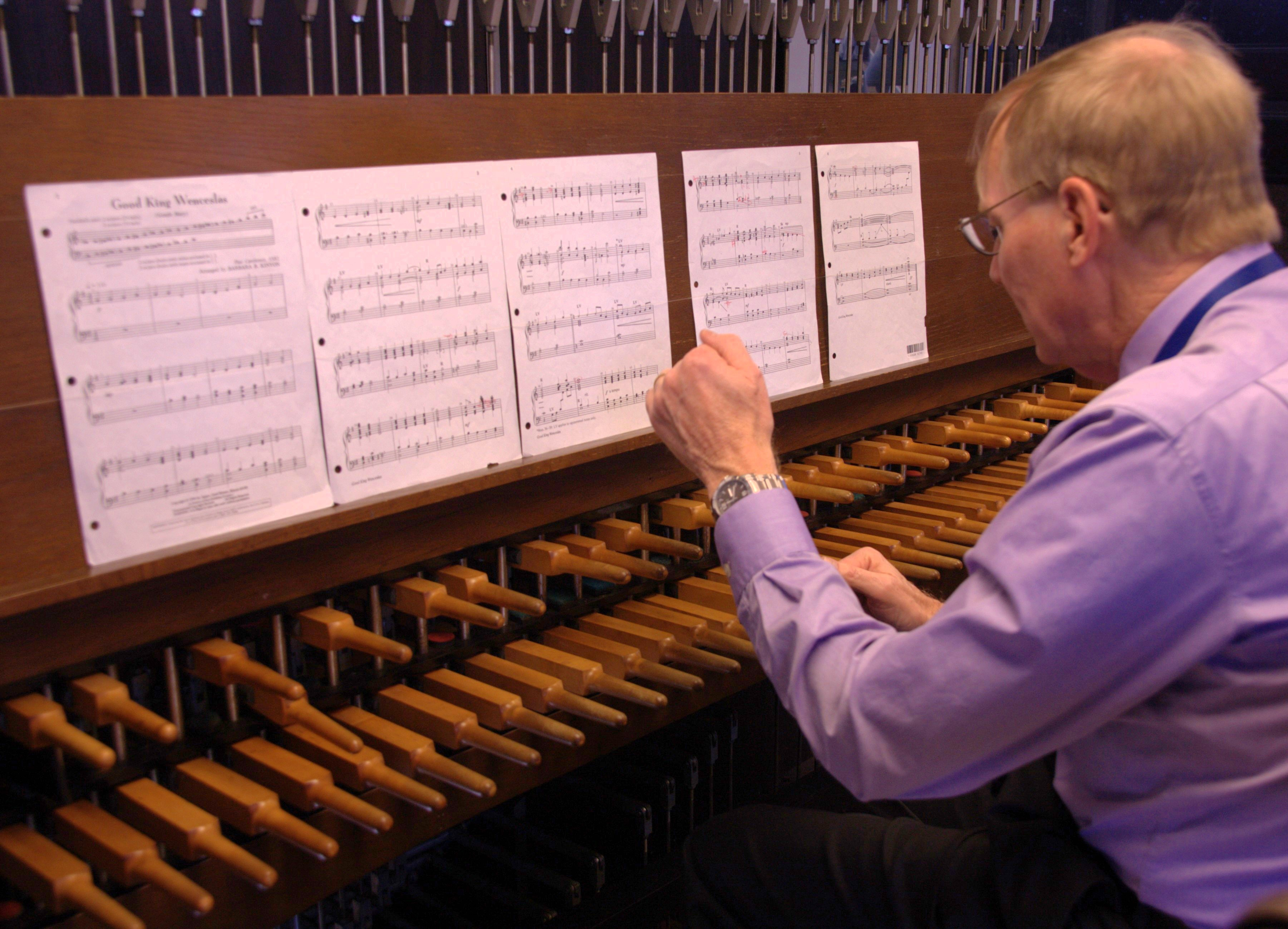
A carillonneur plays "Good King Wenceslas" on the Plummer Building's 56-bell carillon during the 2016 Holiday season

It is topped by a distinctive terra-cotta trimmed tower which contains a 56-bell carillon. The carillon is played daily, and its music can be heard throughout downtown. The tower is lit by floodlights every night and is a centerpiece of the city's skyline. Ray Corwin, of Ellerbe and Round, designed the building's decorative elements. Corwin also was responsible for the design of the decorative elements found in the Chateau Theatre and Oakwood Cemetery gate.

The Plummer Building is among the more than 200 structures designed by the Ellerbe firm in Rochester. They are also the architect of record for other Mayo buildings including the 1914 "Red" Clinic building, the 1922 Mayo Institute for Experimental Medicine building, the 1954 Clinic building, and the 2002 Gonda Building, as well as the Rochester Methodist Hospital.

Its 4,000-pound (1,800 kg) ornamental bronze doors nearly always stand open, symbolizing eternal willingness to accept those in medical need. They have been closed only to commemorate notable events in Mayo or national history.

== See also ==
- Art Deco in the United States
- List of tallest buildings in Rochester, Minnesota
- List of National Historic Landmarks in Minnesota
- National Register of Historic Places listings in Olmsted County, Minnesota

Preceded by Minneapolis City Hall	Tallest building in Minnesota; 1926—1929; 298 feet (91 m)	Succeeded by Foshay Tower
