= Princess Imoukhuede =

American chemical engineer

- Born: Princess Izevbua Imoukhuede; 1980 (age 45–46)
- Education: Massachusetts Institute of Technology; California Institute of Technology
- Awards: National Science Foundation CAREER Award (2017)
- Scientific career
- Fields: Systems Biology; Vascular Biology; Cellular and Molecular Bioengineering; Regenerative Medicine
- Workplaces: Washington University in St. Louis; Johns Hopkins University; University of Illinois at Urbana–Champaign
- Thesis: Visualizing the membrane confinement, trafficking and structure of the GABA transporter, GAT1 (2008)
- Doctoral advisor: Henry A. Lester
- Website: imoukhuedelab.wustl.edu

Princess Imoukhuede (pronounced I-muh-KWU-e-de) (born 1980) is an American chemical engineer who is a Professor in Bioengineering at the University of Washington as the Hunter and Dorthy Simpson Endowed Chair. She conducts groundbreaking research on angiogenic signaling and vascular biology. Her lab employs quantitative systems biology to understand and control signaling networks driving blood-vessel formation, with the aim of developing treatments for diseases like cancer and cardiovascular disorders. Imoukhuede's work has earned her numerous awards, including the National Science Foundation CAREER Award and the Biomedical Engineering Society Mid-Career Award, and the Illinois Mathematics and Science Academy Distinguished Leadership Award and the 2018 Nano Research Young Innovators Award in Nanobiotechnology, recognizing her significant contributions to scholarship, education, and mentorship. Her first name is 'Princess' however, she holds no royal title or position in any capacity.

== Early life and education ==
Imoukhuede grew up in Matteson, Illinois. She was involved with track and field as a child, and competed in shot put from the age of eight. By the time she was in eighth grade she had become interested in science, and her parents gave her a chemistry set to play with at home. Imoukhuede attended the Illinois Mathematics and Science Academy. Imoukhuede was an undergraduate student in biomedical engineering at Massachusetts Institute of Technology (MIT), where she performed undergraduate research under the supervision of Robert S. Langer on the incorporation of adenoviruses in a liposome-based gene therapy system. In her freshman year she was honoured at the Eastern College Athletic Conference, and was the first woman from MIT to qualify for the National Collegiate Athletic Association. Whilst at MIT, Imoukhuede took part in athletics, serving as captain of the varsity track and field team, and was named an NCAA All-American athlete. Imoukhuede was described by Roger Crosley, then MIT Director of Sport, as "the best weight thrower we ever had in track and field". After earning her bachelor's degree, Imoukhuede moved to the California Institute of Technology, where she worked with Henry A. Lester on the structure of the GABA transporter and Förster resonance energy transfer. She was the first African American woman to receive a PhD in bioengineering from Caltech.

== Research and career ==
Imoukhuede was a postdoctoral scholar at Johns Hopkins University, where she specialised in biomedical engineering in the laboratory of Aleksander Popel. She was 1 of 10 postdoctoral fellows nationwide to earn the prestigious United Negro College Fund/Merk Postdoctoral Fellowship. During her fellowship, started working on the vascular endothelial growth factor (VEGF) and its receptor (VEGFR) in ischemia and cancer. After completing her postdoctoral research, Imoukhuede joined the University of Illinois at Urbana–Champaign. Currently, Imoukhuede is a professor of bioengineering at the University of Washington as the Hunter and Dorthy Simpson Endowed Chair.

Imoukhuede studies the mechanisms that regulate angiogenic signalling, including tyrosine kinase receptors, VEGF receptors and platelet-derived growth factor receptors. In 2019 Imoukhuede and Sarah K. England partnered to improve the efficacy and safety of oxytocin during labour. Imoukhuede is developing a computational model that could be used to predict the function of oxytocin receptor function. Her current focus is to unravel the complexities governing blood-vessel formation which gives the potential for treatment for several diseases such as breast cancer and some cardiovascular diseases. As of 2025, Imoukhuede has been deriving a computational model to find the optimal dosage for oxytocin, especially during pregnancy.

=== Awards and honours ===
- MIT Class of 1972 Award
  - This award is given for a project that most improves quality of life for people or that benefits the environment.
- 2008 Commitment to Diversity Award, Caltech
- 2008 UNCF Merck Postdoctoral Research Fellowship
- 2009 NIH Loan Repayment Awardee for Clinical Research
- 2011 Gordon Conference Angiogenesis Poster Award
- 2013-2015 American Cancer Society, Illinois Division, Basic Research Grant
- 2015 NIH-NIDDK, Basic Research Award
- 2017 Rose Award for Teaching Excellence by University of Illinois College of Engineering
- 2017 National Science Foundation CAREER Award
- 2018 IMSA Distinguished Leadership Award Winner
- 2018 Young Innovator in Nanobiotechnology
- 2019 American Institute of Chemical Engineers Futures Researcher
- 2020 Cell Mentor named Imoukhuede as one of 1,000 "inspiring black scientists"
- 2020 High Impact Innovation and Inspiration (HI3) Speaker Award
  - Presented by the University of Pittsburgh Graduate Women in Engineering Network
- 2021 Biomedical Engineering Society Mid-Career Award
  - This award recognizes members who demonstrate significant leadership in achievements in scholarship, education, and mentorship
- Imoukhuede was recognized as an Excellent Instructor by the University of Illinois Center for Teaching Excellence

=== Selected publications ===
Her publications include:

- Subcellular Trafficking, Pentameric Assembly, and Subunit Stoichiometry of Neuronal Nicotinic Acetylcholine Receptors Containing Fluorescently Labeled α6 and β3 Subunits
- Quantification and cell-to-cell variation of vascular endothelial growth factor receptors
- Pharmacokinetics and pharmacodynamics of VEGF-neutralizing antibodies
- Sex differences in cancer mechanisms

=== Patents ===
- Morales, R., Sherin, R.S., Imoukhuede, P.I.U., Burke, D., Gomez, M., Ramirez, D.L., Castaneda, A. (2003). Construction set for building structures (A63H 033/08 ed, U.S. Patent 6,641,453). United States of America: Academy of Applied Science.
