= Robert S. Langer =

American scientist and academic

Robert Samuel Langer, Jr.
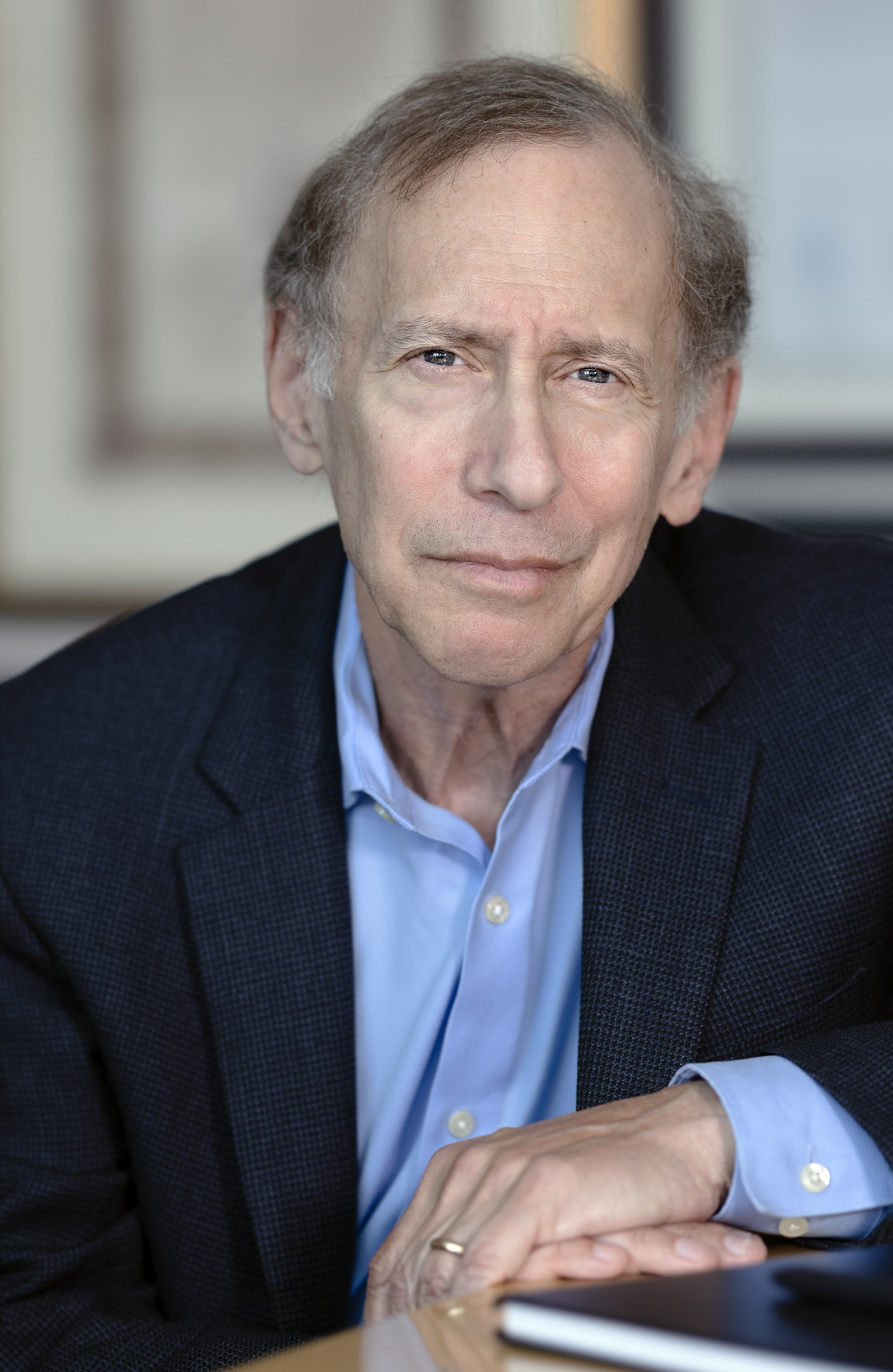
- Langer in 2023
- Born: August 29, 1948 (age 78); Albany, New York, United States
- Other name: Bob Langer
- Education: Cornell University (BSc); Massachusetts Institute of Technology (ScD)
- Known for: Controlled drug delivery and tissue engineering
- Awards: Gairdner Foundation International Award (1996); Charles Stark Draper Prize (2002); John Fritz Medal (2003); Harvey Prize (2003); Heinz Award (2004); Albany Medical Center Prize (2005); National Medal of Science (2006); Millennium Technology Prize (2008); Prince of Asturias Award (2008); National Medal of Technology and Innovation (2011); Perkin Medal (2012); Wilhelm Exner Medal (2012); Priestley Medal (2012); Wolf Prize in Chemistry (2013); IRI Medal (2013); Breakthrough Prize in Life Sciences (2014); Kyoto Prize (2014); Biotechnology Heritage Award (2014); FREng (2010); Queen Elizabeth Prize for Engineering (2015); Kabiller Prize in Nanoscience and Nanomedicine (2017); Medal of Science (Portugal) (2020); BBVA Foundation Frontiers of Knowledge Awards (2021); Balzan Prize (2022); Dr. Paul Janssen Award for Biomedical Research (2023); Kavli Prize (2024); Double Helix Medal (2025); Lipid Science Prize (2025); Welch Award in Chemistry (2026)
- Scientific career
- Fields: Chemical Engineering; Biotechnology; Pharmaceuticals; Business
- Workplaces: Massachusetts Institute of Technology
- Doctoral advisor: Clark K. Colton
- Other academic advisors: Judah Folkman
- Doctoral students: Larry R. Brown, W. Mark Saltzman, Erin Lavik, Steven R. Little, Elazer R. Edelman, David J. Mooney, Samir Mitragotri, Mark Prausnitz, Ali Khademhosseini, Joyce Wang, Ram Sasisekharan, Milica Radisic
- Other notable students: Kristi Anseth, David Edwards (engineer), Jennifer Elisseeff, Omid Cameron Farokhzad, Linda Griffith, Guadalupe Hayes-Mota, Jeffrey Karp, Cato Laurencin, Christine E. Schmidt, Robert J. Linhardt, Antonios Mikos, Gordana Vunjak-Novakovic, David Berry, Isaac Berzin, Kathryn Uhrich, Joseph Kost, Akhilesh K. Gaharwar, Molly Stevens, Princess Imoukhuede, Guillermo Ameer, Canan Dağdeviren, Laura Niklason, María José Alonso, Kaitlyn Sadtler, Shiva Ayyadurai, Mariah Hahn, Rong Tong, Shulamit Levenberg, Kathryn Whitehead

External videos
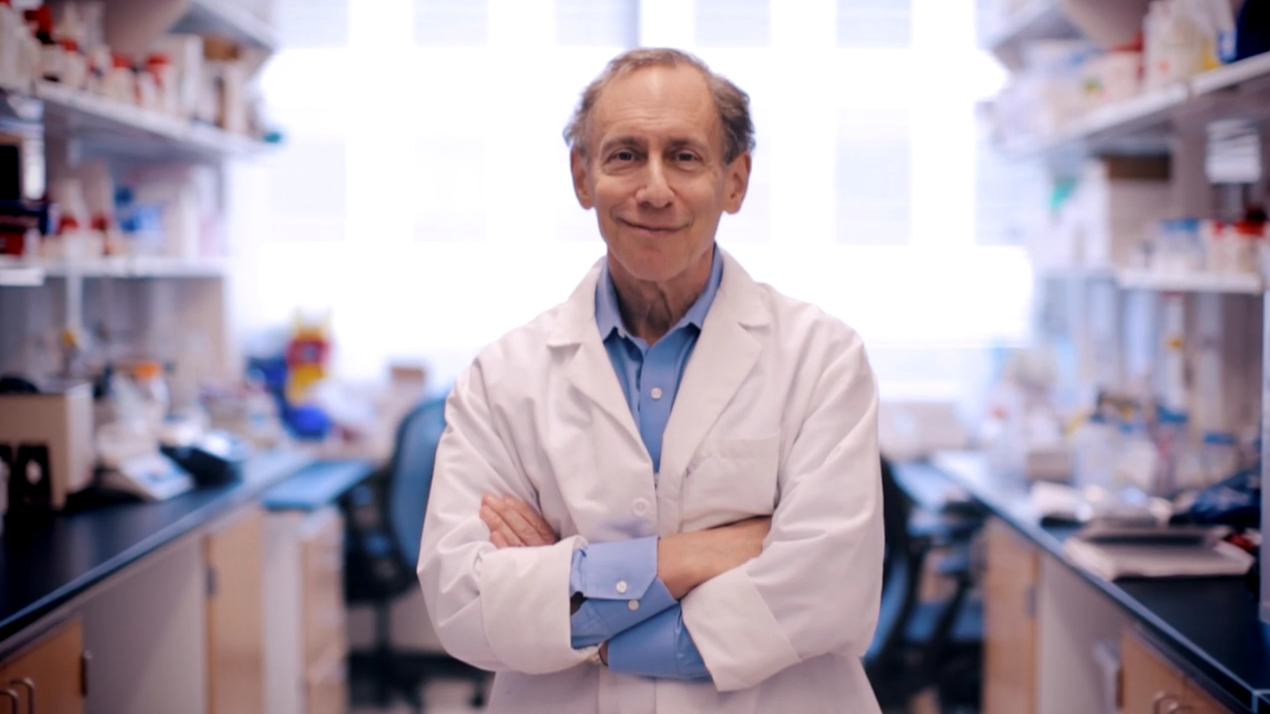
- Scientists You Must Know: Robert Langer, You want to put yourself in the position where you'll make the discoveries for tomorrow, Science History Institute
- Hundreds of millions of people a year across the world benefit from the technologies that rest on the work of Robert Langer., Queen Elizabeth Prize for Engineering 2015
- “Medical advances based on Professor Langer’s discoveries have improved the lives of billions of people worldwide and continue to shape the future of healthcare,” said Gina A. Luna, Chair and Director of The Welch Foundation.

Robert Samuel Langer Jr. FREng (born August 29, 1948) is an American biotechnologist, businessman, chemical engineer, chemist, and inventor. He is one of the 12 Institute Professors at the Massachusetts Institute of Technology.

He was formerly the Germeshausen Professor of Chemical and Biomedical Engineering and maintains activity in the Department of Chemical Engineering and the Department of Biological Engineering at MIT. He is also a faculty member of the Harvard–MIT Program in Health Sciences and Technology and the Koch Institute for Integrative Cancer Research.

Langer has received the worlds 2 highest engineering honors - the Charles Stark Draper Prize and the Queen Elizabeth Prize for Engineering (each of which has been called the Engineering Nobel Prize). He is the only person to have received both of these awards individually. Langer holds over 1,400 granted or pending patents. He is one of the world's most highly cited researchers and his h-index is now (according to Google Scholar, 2026-9-22) 340 with currently over 486,000 citations. He is a widely recognized and cited researcher in biotechnology, especially in the fields of drug delivery systems and tissue engineering.

He is the most cited engineer in history and one of the 10 most cited individuals in any field, having authored over 1,600 scientific papers. Langer is also a prolific businessman, having been behind the participation in the founding of over 40 biotechnology companies including the well-known American pharmaceutical company, Moderna.

Langer's research laboratory at MIT is the largest biomedical engineering lab in the world; maintaining over $10 million in annual grants and over 100 researchers. He has been awarded numerous leading prizes in recognition of his work.

== Background and personal life ==
Langer was born August 29, 1948, in Albany, New York.

He is an alumnus of The Milne School and received his bachelor's degree from Cornell University in chemical engineering. He earned his Sc.D. in chemical engineering from Massachusetts Institute of Technology in 1974. His dissertation was entitled "Enzymatic regeneration of ATP" and completed under the direction of Clark K. Colton. From 1974–1977 he worked as a postdoctoral fellow at the Children's Hospital Boston and at Harvard Medical School under Judah Folkman.

== Contributions to medicine and biotechnology ==
Langer is widely regarded for his contributions to medicine and biotechnology. He is considered a pioneer of many new technologies, including controlled release systems and transdermal delivery systems, which allow the administration of drugs or extraction of analytes from the body through the skin without needles or other invasive methods.

Langer worked with Judah Folkman at Boston Children's Hospital to isolate the first angiogenesis inhibitor, a macromolecule to block the spread of blood vessels in tumors. Macromolecules tend to be broken down by digestion and blocked by body tissues if they are injected or inhaled, so finding a delivery system for them is difficult. Langer's idea was to encapsulate the angiogenesis inhibitor in a noninflammatory synthetic polymer system that could be implanted in the tumor and control the release of the inhibitor. He eventually invented polymer systems that would work. This discovery is considered to lay the foundation for much of today's drug delivery technology.

Langer also worked with Henry Brem of the Johns Hopkins University Medical School on a drug-delivery system for the treatment of brain cancer, to deliver chemotherapy directly to a tumor site. The wafer implants that he and his teams have designed have become increasingly more sophisticated, and can now deliver multiple drugs, and respond to stimuli. In 2019, he and his team developed and patented a technique whereby microneedle tattoo patches could be used to label people with invisible ink to store medical information subcutaneously. This was presented as a boon to "developing nations" where lack of infrastructure means an absence of medical records. The technology uses a "quantum dot dye that is delivered, along with a vaccine, by a microneedle patch."

Langer is regarded as the founder of tissue engineering in regenerative medicine. He and the researchers in his lab have made advances in tissue engineering, such as the creation of engineered blood vessels and vascularized engineered muscle tissue. Bioengineered synthetic polymers provide a scaffolding on which new skin, muscle, bone, and entire organs can be grown. With such a substrate in place, victims of serious accidents or birth defects could more easily grow missing tissue. Such polymers can be biocompatible and biodegradable.

Langer is involved in several projects related to diabetes. Alongside Daniel G. Anderson, he has contributed bioengineering work to a project involving teams from MIT, Harvard University and other institutions, to produce an implantable device to treat type 1 diabetes by shielding insulin-producing beta cells from immune system attacks. He is also part of a team at MIT that have developed a drug capsule that could be used to deliver oral doses of insulin to people with type 1 diabetes.

== Awards and honors ==
At 43 years old, Langer was the youngest person in history to be elected to all three American science academies: the National Academy of Sciences, the National Academy of Engineering and the National Academy of Medicine. He was also elected as a charter member of National Academy of Inventors. He was elected as an International Fellow of the Royal Academy of Engineering in 2010.

Langer has received more than 220 major awards. He is one of three living individuals to have received both the U.S. National Medal of Science and the National Medal of Technology and Innovation.

- 1996: Gairdner Foundation International Award
- 1998: Lemelson-MIT Prize for invention and innovation
- 2002: Othmer Gold Medal
- 2002: Dickson Prize in Science
- 2002: Charles Stark Draper Prize (considered the equivalent of the Nobel Prize for engineers).
- 2003: Golden Plate Award of the American Academy of Achievement
- 2003: Harvey Prize in Science & Technology and Human Health.
- 2005: Dan David Prize
- 2005: Albany Medical Center Prize in Medicine and Biomedical Research.
- 2006: United States National Medal of Science from President George W. Bush.
- 2008: Max Planck Research Award 2008
- 2008: Prince of Asturias Award for Scientific Research
- 2008: Awarded Finland's Millennium Technology Prize for developing innovative biomaterials for controlled drug release.
- 2010: Elected an International Fellow of the Royal Academy of Engineering.
- 2011: The Economist's Innovation award in the category of bioscience for his proven successes in drug-delivery and tissue engineering.
- 2011: Warren Alpert Foundation Prize
- 2012: Perkin Medal, recognized as the highest honor given for outstanding work in applied chemistry in the United States.
- 2012: Wilhelm Exner Medal.
- 2012: Priestley Medal, the highest honor conferred by the American Chemical Society (ACS), for distinguished service in the field of chemistry.
- 2013: United States National Medal of Technology and Innovation from President Obama.
- 2013: Wolf Prize in Chemistry for conceiving and implementing advances in polymer chemistry that provide both controlled drug-release systems and new biomaterials.
- 2013: IEEE Medal for Innovations in Healthcare Technology
- 2014: The Biotechnology Industry Organization (BIO) and the Chemical Heritage Foundation selected Robert Langer as the winner of the 2014 Biotechnology Heritage Award for significant contribution to the growth of biotechnology.
- 2014: Awarded the $3 million Breakthrough Prize in Life Sciences for his work.
- 2014: Kyoto Prize
- 2015: Queen Elizabeth Prize for Engineering
- 2015: Named Cornell University's 2015 Entrepreneur of the Year.
- 2015: Scheele Award
- 2015: Kazemi Prize (Royan Institute)
- 2015: Hoover Medal
- 2016: European Inventor Award
- 2016: Benjamin Franklin Medal in Life Science
- 2017: Kabiller Prize in Nanoscience and Nanomedicine
- 2017: Named 1# Translational Researcher in the World by Nature Biotechnology.
- 2018: Named 1# Translational Researcher in the World by Nature Biotechnology.
- 2018: Leadership Award for Historic Scientific Advancement, American Chemical Society
- 2018: Inducted into Advanced Materials Hall of Fame
- 2019: Hope Funds for Cancer Award of Excellence in Basic Sciences
- 2019: National Library of Medicine (Friends) Distinguished Medical Science Award
- 2019: Dreyfus Prize in the Chemical Sciences
- 2020: Maurice Marie–Janot Award
- 2020: Medalha da Ciência, Highest Distinction for Scientists, Government of Portugal (Portugal's Highest Honor)
- 2021: Elected Foreign Associate, Chinese Academy of Engineering
- 2021: Biomaterials Global Impact Award
- 2021: Falch Lecture Prize, University of Bergen, Norway
- 2021: John P. Merrill Award
- 2021: BBVA Foundation Frontiers of Knowledge Award
- 2022: Balzan Prize
- 2023: Cornell Engineering Distinguished Alumni Award
- 2023: Genome Valley Excellence Award (India)
- 2023: Hamilton Medal (Queen's University Belfast)
- 2023/2024: Paul Janssen Award
- 2024: Kavli Prize in Nanoscience
- 2025: Ellis Island Medal of Honor
- 2025: Lipid Science Prize (Camurus Lipid Research Foundation - Sweden)
- 2025: Double Helix Medal with Martina Navratilova and Chris Evert
- 2025: Elected to Plastics Hall of Fame
- 2026: Named number 39 of the Forbes 250 America's Greatest Innovators [Number 1 of all academic scientists]
- 2026: Welch Award in Chemistry
- 2026: European-MRS 2026 Jan Czochralski Award

He has received numerous other awards, including the 10th Annual Heinz Award in the category of Technology, the Economy and Employment (2003), In 2013 he was awarded the IRI Medal alongside long-time friend George M. Whitesides for outstanding accomplishments in technological innovation that have contributed broadly to the development of industry and the benefit of society. He also received the Rusnano prize that year.

Langer has honorary degrees from 45 universities from around the world including Harvard, Yale, Columbia and Oxford Universities and the UCSF medal.

In November 2024, Chiba Institute of Technology awarded an honorary doctorate to Langer.

Several awards have been named for Dr. Langer. These include the Langer Prize (AIChE), the Langer-Sandberg Mentorship and Innovation Leadership Award (National Academy of Inventors), and the Langer Professorship (Cornell University).

Langer is featured in two different exhibits at Boston's Logan Airport. At terminal C (near Gate 8) in the exhibit '4 centuries of Massachusetts Innovation', Langer and Judah Folkman are listed for 'Cancer breakthrough-1st cancer blood vessel inhibitor'. In terminal E, Massachusetts innovators-Transforming the world, Langer is featured as "Revolutionary Biomedical Technology through Development of Controlled Drug Delivery Systems" (near Gate 12).

== Business ventures ==
Langer has been involved in the founding of many companies, more than twenty in partnership with the venture capital firm Polaris Partners.

These companies include:

- Acusphere
- AIR (acquired by Alkermes and subsequently acquired by Acorda)
- Arsenal Medical
- Arsia (acquired by Eagle Pharmaceuticals)
- BIND Therapeutics (acquired by Pfizer)
- Tarveda Therapeutics (formerly Blend Therapeutics)
- Sontra Medical (acquired by Echo Therapeutics)
- Enzytech (acquired by Alkermes)
- Tissium (formerly Gecko Biomedical)
- InVivo Therapeutics
- Kala
- Landsdowne Labs
- Living Proof (acquired by Unilever)
- Lyra Therapeutics
- Lyndra Therapeutics (acquired by Innoviva)
- Microchips Biotech (acquired by Dare)
- Moderna
- Momenta (acquired by Johnson and Johnson)
- Olivo Labs (acquired by Shisheido)
- Pervasis (acquired by Shire Pharmaceuticals)
- PixarBio
- Pulmatrix (merged with Eos SENOLYTIX)
- PureTech
- Selecta Biosciences (merged to form Cartesian Therapeutics)
- Semprus Biosciences (acquired by Teleflex)
- Seventh Sense (changed to Your Bio Health and acquired by Hims and Hers)
- SQZ Biotech
- Soufflé Therapeutics Inc.
- Taris (acquired by Johnson and Johnson)
- Transform (acquired by Johnson and Johnson)
- T2Biosystems
- Frequency Therapeutics (merged to form Korro Bio)
- Sigilon Therapeutics (acquired by Eli Lilly)
- Seer Bio
- Syntis
- Vivitex
- Vitakey

Success of these other companies and Langer's contribution has been detailed by Harvard Business Review:.

Langer is a member of the Advisory Board of Patient Innovation, a nonprofit, international, multilingual, free venue for patients and caregivers of any disease to share their innovations. He is also a member of the Xconomists, an ad hoc team of editorial advisors for the tech news and media company, Xconomy.

He also serves as a Scientific Advisor to Helus Pharma and Lindus Health.

Awards
Preceded by Shuji Nakamura	Millennium Technology Prize winner 2008 (for Innovative biomaterials)	Succeeded by Michael Grätzel
