= Hagan Arena =

Multi-purpose arena in Philadelphia

Michael J. Hagan '85 Arena
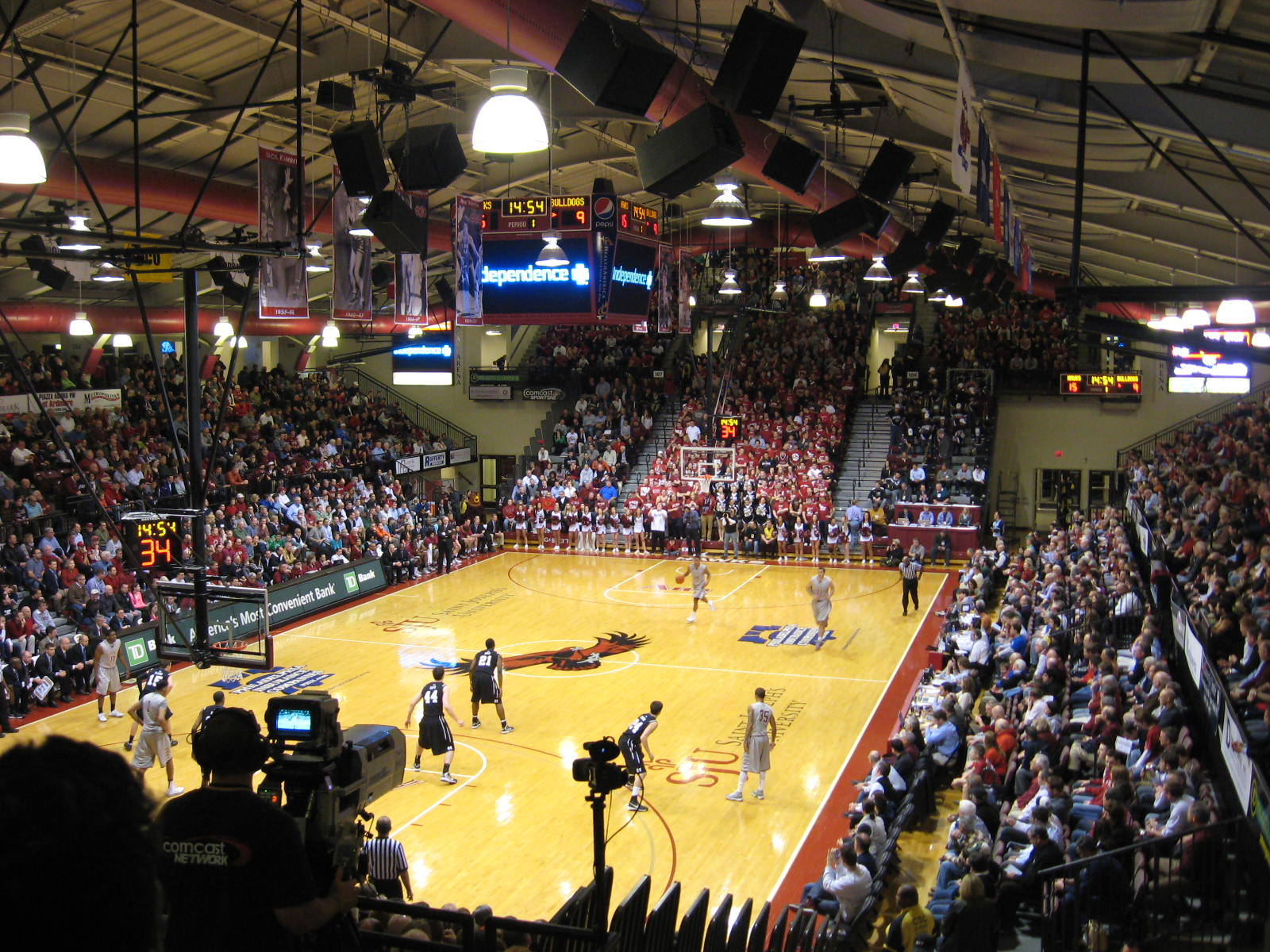
- Interactive map of Michael J. Hagan '85 Arena
- Former names: Alumni Memorial Fieldhouse (1949–2009)
- Location: Saint Joseph's University; 54th and Overbrook; Philadelphia, Pennsylvania
- Coordinates: 39.995245°N 75.234806°W
- Owner: Saint Joseph's University
- Operator: Saint Joseph's University
- Capacity: 3,200 (1949–2008); 3,800 (2009–present)
- Surface: Multi-surface
- Public transit: SEPTA bus: 1, 44, 52, 65

Construction
- Opened: November 11, 1949
- Renovated: 2009
- Cost: $25 million (2009 renovation)
- Architect: Burt Hill Architects
- Structural engineer: Thornton Tomasetti
- General contractor: L.F. Driscoll

Tenants
- Saint Joseph's Hawks men's basketball (NCAA) (1949–2008, 2009–present); Philadelphia Freedoms (WTT) (2017–2019)

Michael J. Hagan '85 Arena (previously known as the Alumni Memorial Fieldhouse) is a 3,800-seat multi-purpose arena located on the campus of Saint Joseph's University in Philadelphia, Pennsylvania. The arena is the home to the Saint Joseph's Hawks men's and women's basketball teams, and formerly was the home court for the Philadelphia Freedoms of World TeamTennis (WTT).

Originally built in 1949 as Alumni Memorial Fieldhouse, the arena underwent a $25 million renovation in 2009.

== History ==
=== Alumni Memorial Fieldhouse ===
Alumni Memorial Fieldhouse was a 3,200-seat multi-purpose arena in Philadelphia, Pennsylvania. The arena, home to the Saint Joseph's University Hawks basketball opened in 1949 and was inaugurated on November 26 with a loss to the University of Rhode Island. The first women's varsity home game was a loss to Immaculata University on January 17, 1974. The building was dedicated to all college soldier-heroes on its dedication day, Veterans Day 1949.

In addition to serving as an arena for the basketball teams, Alumni Memorial Fieldhouse also contains locker rooms for students, faculty, and other varsity teams, an additional recreation room, squash courts, a swimming pool, and a weight room.

On October 26, 1967, the Reverend Dr. Martin Luther King Jr. spoke to 3,400 people in the Fieldhouse. Today, a bronze plaque in the lobby recognizes his visit.

The Hawks won 34 consecutive games in Alumni Memorial Fieldhouse from the late 1950s through the early 1960s. In the mid-1970s and '90s, the Fieldhouse served as the practice home for the Philadelphia 76ers. There were over 125 sellouts over the last 15 years the Fieldhouse was open.

The final game at the Fieldhouse was a win over #8 ranked Xavier University on March 5, 2008. The sell-out crowd included Hawk legends Jameer Nelson and Jack Ramsay.

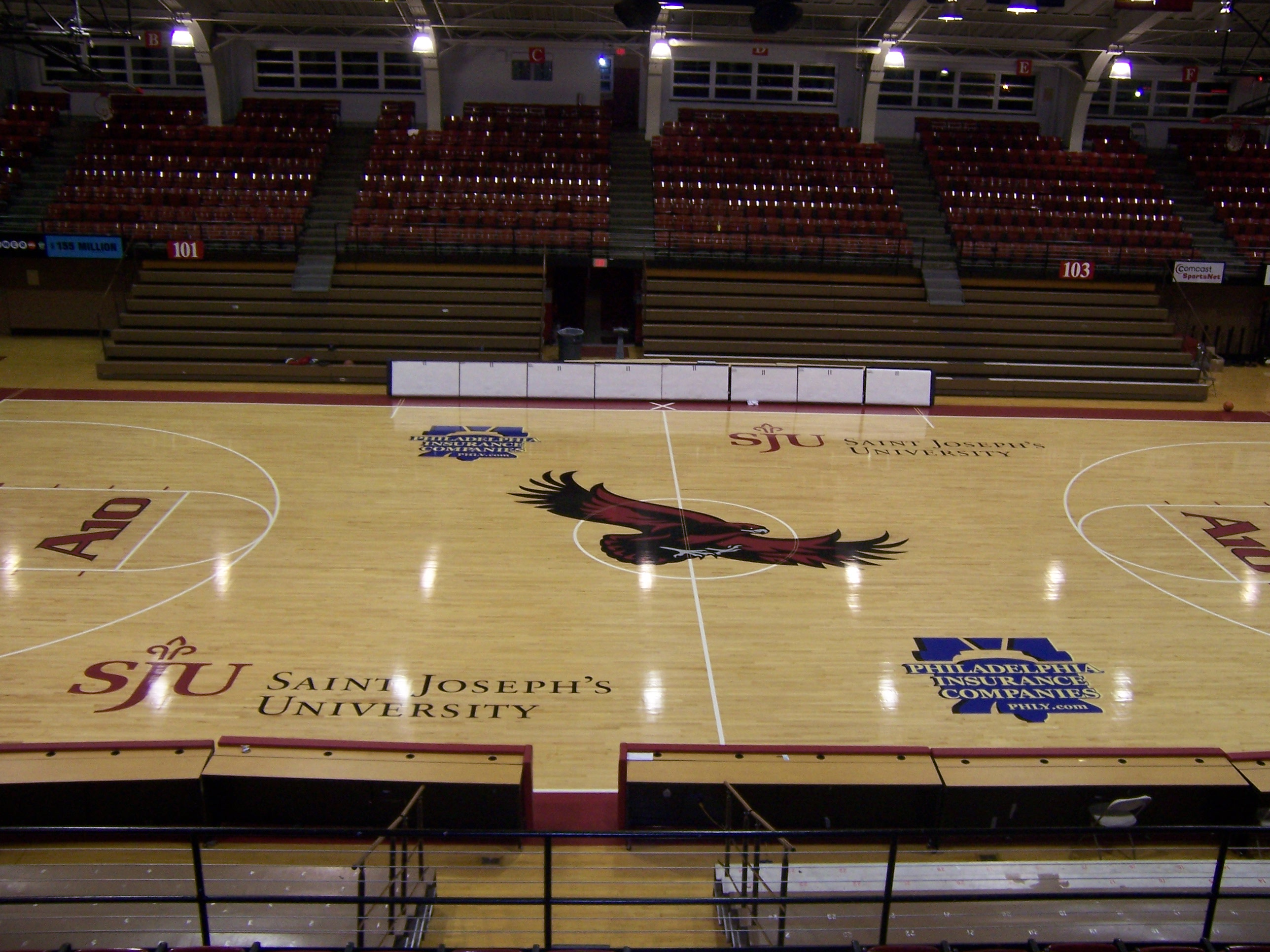
The interior of Alumni Memorial Fieldhouse before the renovation

=== 2009 renovation ===
During the 2007 season, it was announced that the Fieldhouse would be closed and transformed with a $25 million renovation project to provide a 21st-century facility for the quickly growing campus.

During renovations, the Saint Joseph's Hawks men's basketball team played its home games at the Palestra on the University of Pennsylvania's campus, while the women played on the campus of Philadelphia University.

The Fieldhouse underwent extensive renovations and additions, with many sections of the building being razed for expansion purposes. Work began in the fall of 2007. The final product of the project added 600 seats to the arena, as well as the addition of a new basketball center, concourse, entrance and lobby on 54th and Overbrook and concessions.

The arena was named after Michael Hagan, a 1985 graduate of Saint Joseph's and Washington Crossing resident who donated $10 million toward the project. The renovation is part of a larger project called With Faith and Strength To Dare: The Campaign For Saint Joseph's University.

A renovation began in 2023 that adds a concourse, larger offices and locker rooms, a Hall of Fame room, study rooms, basketball center, and practice facilities. 700 seats were added to the student section which puts the total at 1,700 and makes this part of the arena even more intimidating for opposing teams.

== Ramsay Basketball Center ==
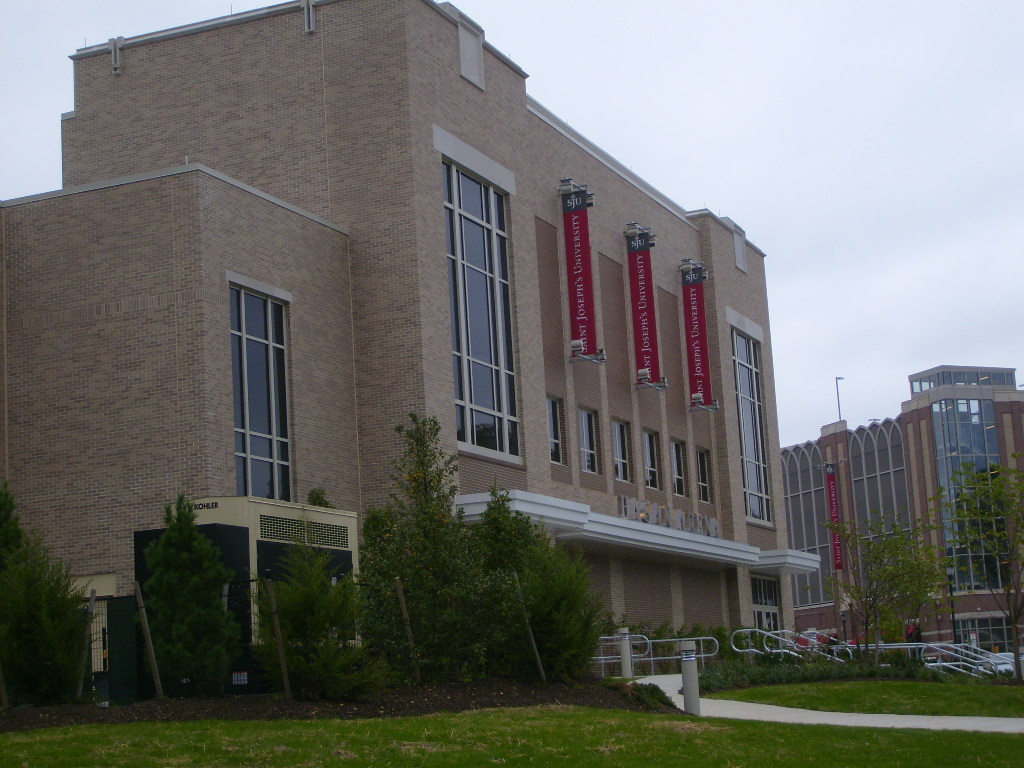
Hagan Arena, exterior

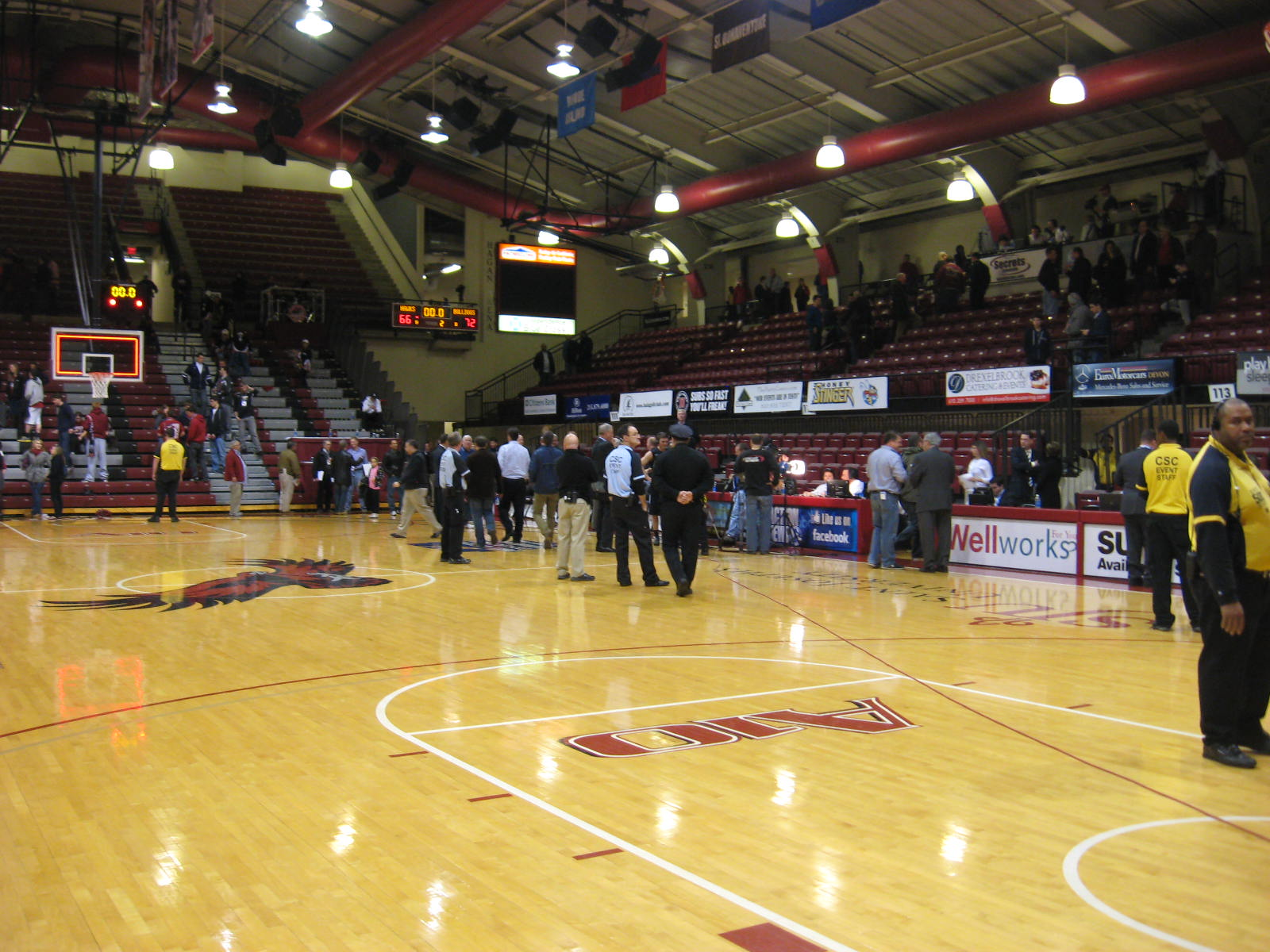
Hagan Arena floor

The Hagan also includes the Ramsay Basketball Center, named after legendary coach Jack Ramsay, which is a two-story, 20,000-square-foot (1,900 m^{2}) wing with locker rooms, offices, study space, conference rooms, and a Hall of Fame room.

The first game at Hagan was a win against Drexel University and the Hawks went 8–4 in the first season at Hagan.

== Concerts & performers at Hagan ==
- Ludacris
- Jay Sean
- Gin Blossoms
- LMFAO
- Keri Hilson
- Nappy Roots
- Mike Posner
- Chingy
- Lupe Fiasco
- Macklemore
- Mac Miller
- Avenged Sevenfold
- Volbeat
- The Mighty Mighty Bosstones
- The Four Seasons
- Flo Rida

== See also ==
- List of NCAA Division I basketball arenas
