= Baljit S. Khakh =

Neuroscientist and professor at UCLA

Baljit S. Khakh FRS

Academic background
- Education: Cardiff University and University of Cambridge
- Academic advisors: Patrick PA. Humphrey, Graeme Henderson, Henry A. Lester, Norman Davidson

-lBaljit S. Khakh is a British neuroscientist. He is Professor of Physiology, Professor of Neurobiology and the Eleanor I. Leslie Chair in Neuroscience at the University of California, Los Angeles.

== Education and career ==
Baljit Khakh completed his Ph.D. at University of Cambridge in 1995 in the laboratory of Professor Patrick PA Humphrey. He then completed his training in the laboratory of Professor Graeme Henderson at the University of Bristol as a Glaxo-Wellcome Postdoctoral Fellow, and then in the laboratory of Professor Henry A. Lester and Professor Norman Davidson at California Institute of Technology as a Wellcome Trust International Prize Travelling Research Fellow. In 2001, Khakh became Group Leader at the MRC Laboratory of Molecular Biology. In 2006, Khakh moved to the University of California, Los Angeles where he was Professor of Physiology and Neurobiology. In 2013, Khakh was awarded the National Institutes of Health Director's Pioneer Award. In 2018, he was awarded the Paul G. Allen Distinguished Investigator Award. In 2019, Khakh received a R35 Outstanding Investigator Award from NINDS. In 2023, Khakh was appointed as the Eleanor I. Leslie Chair in Neuroscience and was awarded the 134th UCLA Faculty Research Lecture. He has presented over 260 research lectures around the world, including multiple Keynote and Plenary lectures. In summer 2026, Khakh became Director of the UK Dementia Research Institute at Cardiff University, Professor and Chair in Neuroscience, and a Royal Society Wolfson Fellow.

Khakh was elected a Fellow of the Royal Society in 2025.

== Research ==
Before around 2008, Khakh worked on ATP-gated P2X receptor channels and helped uncover their roles in the nervous system and their molecular and cellular mechanisms.

Since 2006 Khakh's research has focused on the regulation and roles of astrocytes in the brain. His group is particularly well known for working on astrocyte-neuron interactions. The Khakh lab has developed tools to study astrocytes that are now widely used around the world. Khakh has uncovered mechanisms by which astrocytes regulate neural circuits during physiology and during disease. His lab website is here: https://baljitkhakhlab.healthsciences.ucla.edu/

In addition to his research, Khakh was the Founder and Co-Director of the UCLA Physiology Outreach Program, which worked for nearly 18 years with high schools in the Los Angeles area to provide high school kids with their first thrill of scientific discovery.

== Major publications ==
Ollivier M, Soto JS, Linker KE, Moye SL, Jami-Alahmadi Y, Jones AE, Divakaruni AS, Kawaguchi R, Wohlschlegel JA & Khakh BS (2024) Crym-positive striatal astrocytes gate perseverative behaviour. Nature 627: 358-366.

Soto JS, Jami-Alahmadi Y, Chacon J, Moye SL, Diaz-Castro B, Wohlschlegel JA & Khakh BS (2023) Astrocyte and neuron subproteomes and obsessive-compulsive disorder mechanisms. Nature 616: 764-773.

Endo F, Kasai A, Soto JS, Yu X, Qu, Z, Hashimoto H, Gradinaru V, Kawaguchi R & Khakh BS (2022) Molecular basis of astrocyte diversity and morphology across the CNS in health and disease. Science (Research Article) Nov 4;378(6619): eadc9020.

Nagai J, Bellafard A, Qu Z, Yu X, Ollivier M, Gangwani MR, Diaz-Castro B, Coppola G, Schumacher SM, Golshani P, Gradinaru, V & Khakh, BS (2021) Specific and behaviorally consequential astrocyte Gq GPCR signaling attenuation in vivo with iβARK. Neuron 109: 2256-2274.

Yu X, Nagai J, Marti-Solano M, Soto JS, Coppola G, Babu MM & Khakh, BS (2020) Context-specific striatal astrocyte molecular responses are phenotypically exploitable. Neuron 108: 1146-1162.

Diaz-Castro B, Gangwani M, Yu X, Coppola G & Khakh BS (2019) Astrocyte molecular signatures in Huntington’s disease. Science Translational Medicine Oct 16;11(514): eaaw8546.

Nagai J, Rajbhandari AK, Gangwani MR, Hachisuka A, Coppola G, Masmanidis SC, Fanselow MS & Khakh BS (2019) Hyperactivity with disrupted attention by activation of an astrocyte synaptogenic cue. Cell 177: 1280-1292.

Yu X, Taylor AMW, Nagai J, Golshani P, Evans CJ, Coppola G & Khakh BS (2018) Reducing astrocyte calcium signaling in vivo alters striatal microcircuits and causes repetitive behavior. Neuron 99: 1107-1187.

Octeau JC, Chai H, Jiang R, Bonnano SL, Martin KC & Khakh BS (2018) An optical neuron-astrocyte proximity assay at synaptic distance scales. Neuron 98: 49-66.

Chai H, Diaz-Castro B, Shigetomi E, Monte E, Octeau JC, Yu X, Cohn W, Rajendran PS, Vondriska TM, Whitelegge JP, Coppola G & Khakh BS (2017) Neural circuit-specialized astrocytes: genomic, proteomic, morphological and functional evidence. Neuron 95: 1-19.

Srinivasan R, Lu T-Y, Chai H, Xu J, Huang BS, Golshani P, Coppola G & Khakh BS (2016) New transgenic mouse lines for selectively targeting astrocytes and for studying calcium signals in astrocyte processes in situ and in vivo. Neuron 92: 1181-1195.

Haustein MD, Kracun S, Lu X-H, Shih T, Jackson-Weaver O, Tong X, Xu J, Yang XW, O’Dell TJ, Marvin JS, Ellisman MH, Bushong EA, Looger LL & Khakh BS (2014) Conditions and constraints for astrocyte calcium signaling in the hippocampal mossy fiber pathway. Neuron 82: 413-429.

Tong X, Ao Y, Fass GC, Nwaobi SE, Xu J, Haustein MD, Anderson MA, Mody I, Olsen ML, Sofroniew MV & Khakh BS (2014) Astrocyte Kir4.1 ion channel deficits contribute to neuronal dysfunction in Huntington’s disease model mice. Nature Neuroscience 17: 694-703.

Shigetomi E, Bushong EA, Haustein MD, Tong X, Jackson-Weaver O, Kracun S, Xu J, Sofroniew MV, Ellisman MH & Khakh BS (2013) Imaging calcium microdomains within entire astrocyte territories and endfeet with GCaMPs expressed using adeno-associated viruses. Journal of General Physiology 141: 633-647.

Shigetomi E, Tong X, Kwan K, Corey DP & Khakh BS (2011) TRPA1 mediated microdomains regulate astrocyte resting calcium levels and inhibitory synapse efficacy via GAT-3. Nature Neuroscience 15: 70-80.

Shigetomi E, Kracun S, Sofroniew M & Khakh BS (2010) A genetically targeted optical sensor to monitor calcium signals in astrocyte processes. Nature Neuroscience 13: 759-766.

Notable reviews

Khakh BS (2025) On astrocyte-neuron interactions: broad insights from the striatum. Neuron, 113, 3079-107.

Khakh BS & Goldman SA (2023) Astrocytic contributions to Huntington’s disease pathophysiology. Ann N Y Acad Sci Apr;1522(1): 42-59. doi: 10.1111/nyas.14977.

Nagai J, Yu X, Papouin T, Cheong E, Freeman MR, Monk KR, Hastings MH, Haydon PG, Rowitch D, Shaham S & Khakh BS (2021) Behaviorally consequential astrocytic regulation of neural circuits. Neuron 109: 576-596.

Yu X, Nagai J & Khakh BS (2020) Improved tools to study astrocytes. Nature Reviews Neuroscience 21: 121-138.

Khakh BS (2019) Astrocyte-neuron interactions in the striatum: insights on identity, form and function. Trends in Neuroscience Jul 24. pii: S0166-2236(19)30110-9. doi: 10.1016/j.tins.2019.06.003.

Khakh BS & Deneen B (2019) The Emerging Nature of Astrocyte Diversity. Annu Rev Neurosci 42, 187-207.

Khakh BS, Beaumont V, Cachope R, Munoz-Sanjuan I, Goldman SA & Grantyn R. (2017) Unravelling and exploiting astrocyte dysfunction in Huntington’s disease. Trends in Neurosciences 40: 422-437.

Khakh BS & Sofroniew MV (2015) Diversity of astrocyte functions and phenotypes in neural circuits. Nature Neuroscience 18: 942-952.
