= Kaitlyn Sadtler =

American immunoengineer

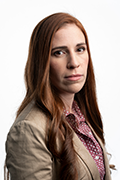
- Education: University of Maryland, Baltimore County (BS); Johns Hopkins University (PhD)
- Known for: US SARS-CoV-2 serosurvey
- Scientific career
- Fields: Immunology; Biomedical engineering
- Workplaces: National Institute of Biomedical Imaging and Bioengineering
- Thesis: Th2 T-cells are required for biomaterial-mediated functional muscle regeneration (2016)
- Doctoral advisor: Jennifer Elisseeff

Kaitlyn Noelle Sadtler is an American immunologist and bioengineer and Stadtman tenure-track Investigator at the National Institute of Biomedical Imaging and Bioengineering, known for her research on immune-active biomaterials for regenerative medicine and for completing the first population-wide serosurvey during the COVID-19 pandemic in the United States in 2020.

== Education ==
Sadtler attended Urbana High School in Ijamsville, Maryland. She went on to earn her BS in biomedical science summa cum laude at University of Maryland, Baltimore County (UMBC) in 2011. She credits her undergraduate engineering experience with giving her a wide view of the different fields that are foundational to her current work. Sadtler is among a cohort of researchers including Kizzmekia Corbett from UMBC who rose to prominence in the COVID-19 pandemic.

Before starting her PhD, Sadtler held a one-year postbaccalaureate research position at the National Institute of Allergy and Infectious Diseases, where she says she "caught the immunology bug." Sadtler worked in the laboratory of Jennifer Elisseeff at the Johns Hopkins University Cellular and Molecular Medicine program for her PhD, which she completed in only three and a half years, focusing on the molecular mechanisms of medical device fibrosis. Parts of her thesis work were published in journals such as Science and Nature Methods.

== Career ==
Sadtler was a postdoctoral fellow with Robert S. Langer and Daniel Anderson at the Massachusetts Institute of Technology, where she focused on how the modulation of immune response influenced tissue development. During her postdoc, Sadtler was recognized as a TED fellow for her talk "How we could teach our bodies to heal faster." She was also named an inaugural (2018) Convergence Scholar for her work in nanomedicine by the Koch Institute and honored as one of the Forbes 30 Under 30 in 2019 for her doctoral research on immune rejection of medical devices.

=== SARS-CoV-2 serosurvey ===
Sadtler organized the first population-wide serosurvey for COVID-19 in the United States, considered critical in developing an understanding of asymptomatic transmission rates. From April to July 2020, her group and collaborators enrolled 10,000 representative volunteers to mail in dry blood samples for testing by ELISA. Initial testing of those samples was completed by the end of September. Sadtler's team was able to sample a representative portion of the US population in part thanks to the overwhelming response of more than 400,000 volunteers for participation. The initial analysis, released as a preprint in early 2021, indicated that there may have been as many as 4.8 unreported infections for each documented infection early in the pandemic, or up to 16.8 million undiagnosed infection. Results also supported that black and Hispanic communities have been most affected by the virus. At the time, when the study was available only as a preprint, Sadtler expressed hopes for eventual follow-up to assess antibody duration and reinfection frequency; the work has since undergone peer review and been published in Science Translational Medicine.
