= Samir Mitragotri =

American chemist (born 1971)

- Born: 28 May 1971 (age 55); Solapur, India
- Education: Institute of Chemical Technology B.S., 1992; Massachusetts Institute of Technology M.S. and PhD, 1996
- Known for: Drug Delivery, Biomaterials
- Awards: National Academy of Engineering; National Academy of Medicine
- Scientific career
- Fields: Chemical Engineering, Biomedical Engineering
- Workplaces: Harvard University; Harvard John A. Paulson School of Engineering and Applied Sciences; Wyss Institute for Biologically Inspired Engineering
- Doctoral advisor: Robert S. Langer, Daniel Blankschtein
- Doctoral students: Julie Champion

Samir Mitragotri (born 28 May 1971) is an Indian American professor at Harvard University, an inventor, an entrepreneur, and a researcher in the fields of drug delivery and biomaterials. He is currently the Hiller Professor of Bioengineering and Hansjörg Wyss Professor of Biologically Inspired Engineering at Harvard John A. Paulson School of Engineering and Applied Sciences and the Wyss Institute for Biologically Inspired Engineering. Prior to 2017, he was the Duncan and Suzanne Mellichamp Chair Professor at University of California, Santa Barbara.

Mitragotri has invented many novel drug delivery technologies, especially in the fields of transdermal, oral and targeted systems. He invented techniques to deliver drugs transdermally using low-frequency ultrasound, pulsed microjet injector, high throughput skin experimentation, skin penetrating peptides and ionic liquids. He also invented intestinal patches and ionic liquids for oral delivery of proteins. Mitragotri also pioneered nanoparticle-enabled cell therapies which use drug-loaded nanoparticles that hitch a ride on red blood cells, monocytes and other circulatory cells for tissue-specific delivery. Mitragotri's technologies are used to develop next generation therapies against diabetes, cancer, psoriasis, hemorrhage, trauma and infections.

Mitragotri has published over 400 research publications and is an inventor on over 300 patents/applications. His publications are cited over 81000 times with an h-index of 140. Mitragotri is a member of the US National Academy of Medicine and the US National Academy of Inventors. He is also a member of the US National Academy of Engineering since 2015 for the development, clinical translation, and commercialization of transdermal drug delivery systems. He is also an elected member of The World Academy of Science, American Academy of Arts & Sciences and Indian National Academy of Engineering. He is a co-founder of several companies that are developing products based on his inventions. He received his PhD in chemical engineering at MIT and BS in chemical engineering from the Institute of Chemical Technology. Mitragotri serves on the editorial boards of several journals and has served as the founding editor-in-chief of Bioengineering and Translational Medicine.

== Awards and honors ==
Mitragotri's national and international awards include:

- Member American Academy of Arts & Sciences (2025)
- Member, The World Academy of Science (2025)
- Founders Award, Controlled Release Society (2025)
- Distinguished Scientist Award, American Association of Pharmaceutical Scientists (2024)
- Doing a World of Good Medal (2023)
- BIOS- Top 50 Lifescience Entrepreneur List (2022)
- Kydonieus Award, Controlled Release Society (2020)
- Clemson Award, Society for Biomaterials (2017)
- Member, National Academy of Medicine (NAM) (2016)
- Fellow, Biomedical Engineering Society (BMES) (2015)
- Fellow, American Association of Pharmaceutical Scientists (AAPS) (2015)
- Fellow, Controlled Release Society (CRS) (2015)
- Andreas Acrivos Award for Professional Progress, American Institute of Chemical Engineers (AIChE) (2015)
- Member, National Academy of Engineering (NAE) (2015)
- Fellow, National Academy of Inventors (NAI) (2013)
- Fellow, American Association for the Advancement of Science (AAAS) (2012)
- Fellow, American Institute for Medical and Biological Engineering (AIMBE) (2010)
- Controlled Release Society’s Young Scientist Award (2008)
- American Institute of Chemical Engineers Allan P. Colburn award (2005)
- Selection by MIT's Technology Review Magazine as one of the world's top Innovators Under 35 (1999)

== Journal associations ==
- Founding Editor-in-chief, Bioengineering and Translational Medicine
- Former Associate editor, Journal of Controlled Release

== Biotech companies ==
Samir Mitragotri has co-founded several companies:

- Sontra Medical, Inc. (acquired by Echo Therapeutics)
- fqubed, Inc. (acquired by Nuvo Research)
- Stratagent LifeSciences (acquired by Corium International)
- Seventh Sense Biosystems (now Your Bio Health, acquired by Hims and Hers)
- Dx Biosciences
- Entrega
- Liquideon, LLC
- CAGE Bio Inc.
- Fount Biosciences
- inTumo Therapeutics
- i2o Therapeutics
- Trillion Bio
