= Mariah Hahn =

American engineer

- Spouse: Juergen Hahn

Academic background
- Education: University of Texas at Austin (BSc); Stanford University (MEng); Massachusetts Institute of Technology (PhD)
- Thesis: Characterization of the vocal fold lamina propria towards voice restoration (2004)
- Doctoral advisor: Robert S. Langer
- Other advisor: Jennifer L. West

Academic work
- Institutions: Rensselaer Polytechnic Institute; Texas A&M University
- Main interests: vocal fold regeneration

Mariah Somer Hahn (née Douglas) is an American chemical and electrical engineer. She is a professor of biomedical engineering at Rensselaer Polytechnic Institute. Hahn is a Fellow of the American Institute for Medical and Biological Engineering and Biomedical Engineering Society

== Early life and education ==
Hahn earned her Bachelor of Science degree in chemical engineering from the University of Texas at Austin in 1998 and received her Master's degree in electrical engineering at Stanford University in 2001. She then enrolled at Massachusetts Institute of Technology (MIT) for her PhD in vocal fold regeneration. Hahn trained under Robert S. Langer during her PhD and worked with Jennifer L. West in her postdoctoral studies at Rice University. While at MIT, Hahn worked with Langer and acclaimed voice surgeon Dr. Steven Zeitels to mitigate the effects of vocal fold scarring. Julie Andrews, who had her vocal cords damaged by a surgery, was associated with the project.

== Career ==
Hahn joined the department of chemical engineering at Texas A&M University in 2005 as an assistant professor. In this role, she continued to develop vocal fold regeneration through tissue engineering. Hahn received a 2010 National Science Foundation CAREER Award to support her research integrating collagen-mimetic protein–based gels with gene silencing methods. Hahn left Texas A&M in 2012 and joined the Department of Biomedical Engineering at Rensselaer Polytechnic Institute (RPI) as an associate professor.

While at RPI, Hahn established the Hahn Tissue Lab, which cultivates cells from human and animal tissue for use in vocal fold repair. She collaborated with other scientists to develop a shape memory polymer coated in a bioactive polydopamine that could be used to replace skull bone lost to injury, surgery, or birth defect. Outside of her lab, Hahn was promoted to Full Professor in 2015 and appointed to the editorial board of the journal Scientific Reports. She was elected a Fellow of the American Institute for Medical and Biological Engineering in 2016 for her "pioneering work on biomaterials for vocal cord reconstruction and cell adhesion studies leading to low thrombogenicity materials."

Hahn was elected a Fellow of the Biomedical Engineering Society in 2022 for her "achievements in soft tissue regeneration and inflammatory disease modeling."

== Research ==
Hahn's research focuses on biomaterials and tissue engineering, with emphasis on three main areas: tissue regeneration, anti-thrombogenic materials, and inflammatory disease modeling.

=== Vocal fold and bone regeneration ===
Hahn has developed hydrogel-based biomaterials for vocal fold tissue engineering, beginning with her PhD work under Robert S. Langer at MIT. Her lab has investigated collagen-mimetic protein-based gels as well as shape memory polymer-based materials to promote bone repair.

=== Anti-thrombogenic materials ===
Hahn's work on cell adhesion has contributed to the development of low-thrombogenicity materials, which resist blood clot formation on biomedical devices surfaces. This research was recognized by her election as a Fellow of the American Institute for Medical and Biological Engineering in 2016.

=== Inflammatory disease modeling ===
Hahn has developed in vitro tissue models to study inflammatory diseases, enabling researchers to test potential therapies outside of animal models. This work was cited in her election as a Fellow of the Biomedical Engineering Society in 2022.

== Personal life ==
Hahn is married to Juergen Hahn, a fellow biomedical engineer at RPI.
