= Center for Biotechnology and Interdisciplinary Studies =

Research facility at RPI

Coordinates: 42.728218°N 73.67834°W

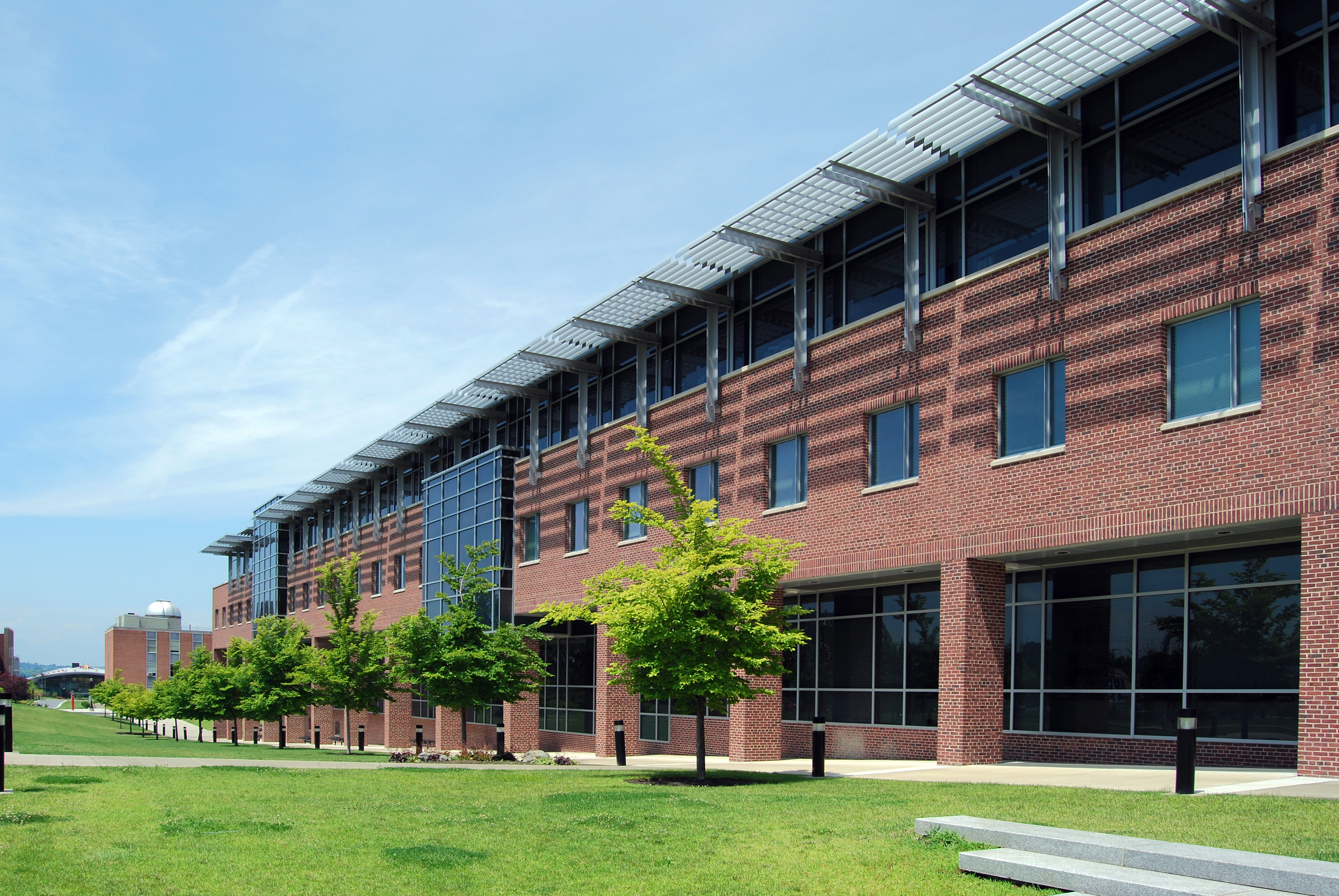
View of south façade

The Shirley Ann Jackson, Ph.D. Center for Biotechnology and Interdisciplinary Studies is a research facility at Rensselaer Polytechnic Institute (RPI). The 218,000-square-foot (20,300 m^{2}) building is located on 15th Street between RPI’s Playhouse and Academy Hall, next to the Center for Industrial Innovation. It was the goal of the instituter to encourage collaboration between experts in different fields, allowing them to solve problems that they would be unable to solve alone. The current director of the center is Juergen Hahn, succeeding Deepak Vashishth, Jonathan Dordick, and Robert Palazzo. The construction cost of the building in 2002 was estimated to be $80M.

== Construction and architecture ==
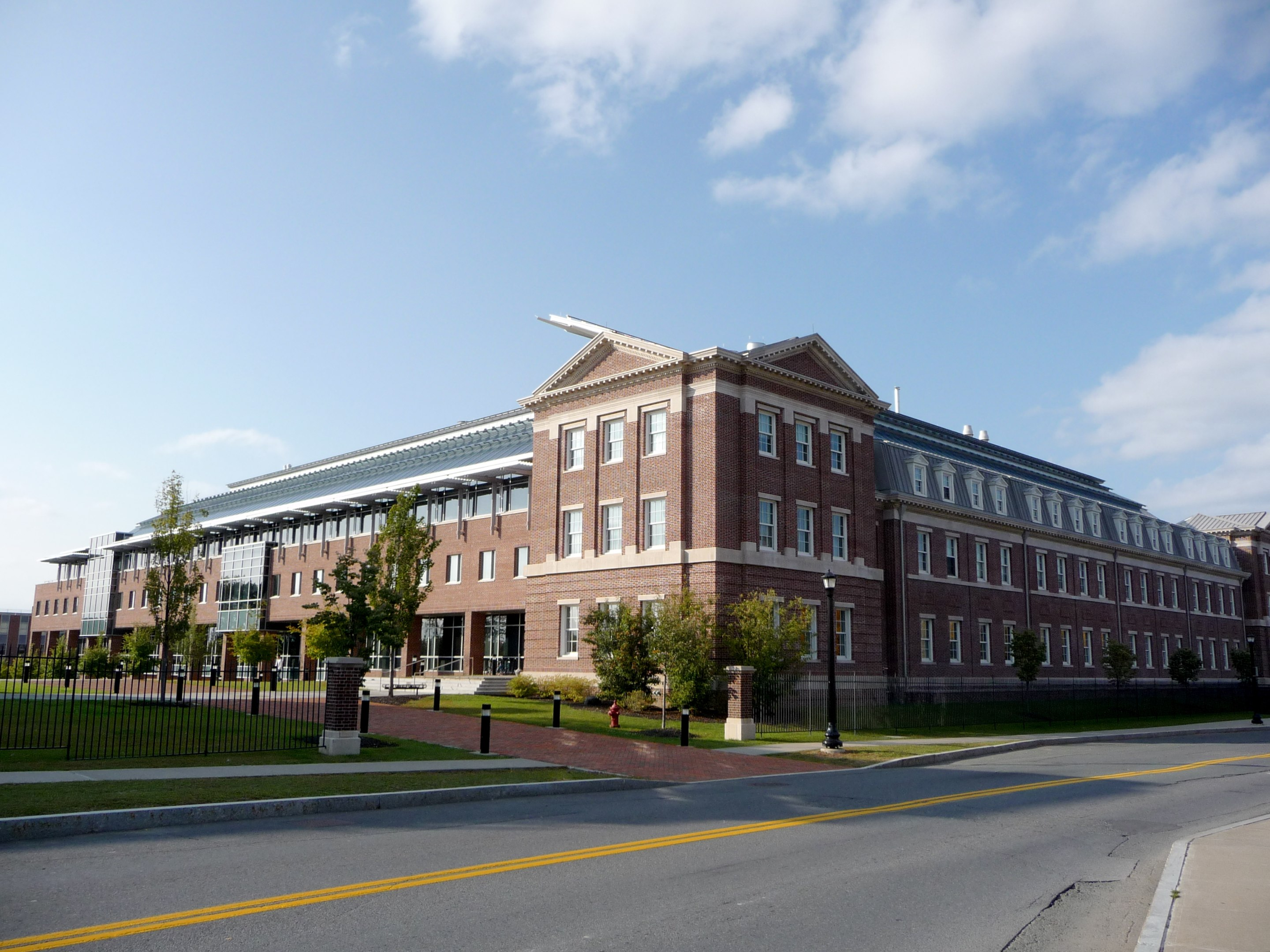
Front entrance viewed from across 15th street

Ground was broken on May 17, 2002 for the Center for Biotechnology and Interdisciplinary Studies as part of the Rensselaer Plan, a $400 million campus improvement project. Much of the plan was made possible by a $130 million anonymous donation in December 2000. Construction lasted through September 2004 when the building officially opened. However, researchers did not begin to use the new facilities until well into the fall 2004 semester.

Early in 2001, Burt Hill Kosar Rittelmann Associates of Butler, Pennsylvania and Bohlin Cywinski Jackson of Pittsburgh, Pennsylvania were chosen by Rensselaer as the architecture firms to handle the design of the structure. Board chairman of Burt Hill Kosar Rittelmann Associates, E. Richard Rittelmann, who obtained an architecture degree from RPI in 1960, was chosen to lead the project. Rittelmann was chosen for the project as his firm was a national leader in the design of research and biotechnology buildings. During the project, twelve students participated in a two-credit course called “Tracking the Biotechnology Center”, a course designed for civil engineering and architecture students. Mark Mistur, an associate professor of architecture, along with Rittelmann, designed the course thinking it “would be a wonderful opportunity for students to see the whole process, including the struggles and successes that result when architects and engineers work together.” The course brought students through the entire process of constructing a building. Topics of the course included everything from the physical construction and design processes of the building to the legal issues associated with such a large project.

The Biotechnology Center appears to be, from the inside, two separate L-shaped buildings. The first of these “buildings” is a group of offices with one three story wing facing 15th Street and another four story wing facing College Ave. The second “building” is a four story section of laboratories that run adjacent to the Center for Industrial Innovation. A large glass atrium separates the two sections. Elevated walkways allow researchers to pass from their offices across the atrium to their laboratories. This is done because laboratory space is very expensive to build and has strict code requirements. Separating the spaces allows for a more cost effective design.

Along with cost effectiveness, the building was also designed with energy efficiency in mind. The large atrium, which gives light to much of the building, requires no heating in the winter, and no cooling in the summer. Natural ventilation is obtained through a series of soffit vents. Laboratories include heat recovery systems to trap heat and incorporate the most energy efficient lighting.

In an effort to blend the new facility with its historical surroundings, the 15th Street façade was designed to match the red brick construction of the Quadrangle residence hall. On the south face of the building a more contemporary style is used, as there are fewer building styles for it to clash with. This side of the building showcases the glass atrium and includes a large open grass area with walkways, benches, and outdoor lighting.

== Building features and facilities ==
View of east façade

At 218,000 square feet (20,250 m²), the Biotechnology Center is the 3rd largest building on RPI’s campus. It contains office space for 400 researchers and over 71,500 square feet (6,600 m²) of laboratory space. To encourage collaboration among researchers, the Biotechnology Center also features 5,830 square feet (540 m²) of seminar space and 5,200 square feet (480 m²) of auditorium and gallery space. Part of this space includes the Bruggeman Conference Center, a 150-seat wired auditorium located on the southwest corner of the building

The Biotechnology Center contains three different types of laboratory spaces to complement each other. The three types are Research, Support and Core Laboratories. Research Laboratories are designed to be flexible. These laboratories were designed in a way so they could be used for almost any type of research activities. Support Laboratories are less flexible than the Research Laboratories but contain special equipment such as a mass spectrometer. Core Laboratories often contain special equipment not available anywhere else in the facility.

=== Core facilities found at the Biotechnology Center ===
As the center is an interdisciplinary center, large scale equipment is housed in core facilities that can be accessed by residents of the center. The number of core facilities and the equipment available in them has increased over time. The center currently has 12 core facilities, the newest of which is the Biomanufacturing core facility. Specifically, these core facilities are:

- Analytical Biochemistry
- Bioimaging
- Bioresearch
- Biomanufacturing
- Cell and Molecular Biology
- Flow Cytometry
- Genomics
- Microbiology & Fermentation
- Microscopy
- Nuclear Magnetic Resonance
- Proteomics
- Stem Cell Research

The center has agreements in place with other universities, hospitals, and research centers in the region that allow researchers to use the core facilities at any of the participating institutions.
