= Jonathan Dordick =

American biochemist (born 1959)

Jonathan S. Dordick
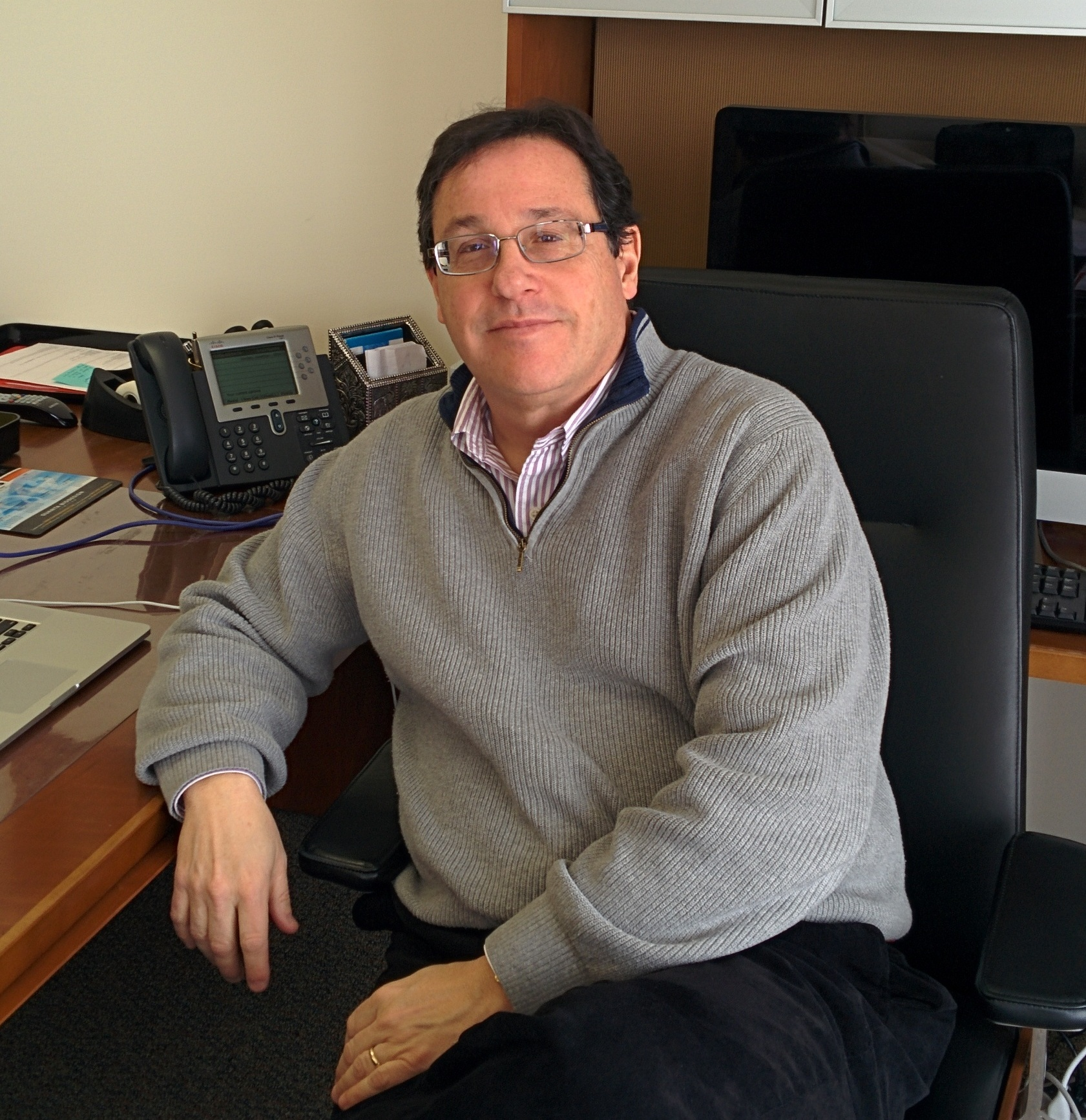
- Dordick working in his office at Rensselaer Polytechnic Institute
- Born: January 15, 1959 (age 67); Philadelphia, Pennsylvania
- Education: MIT; Brandeis University
- Known for: Methods for rapidly screening drug efficacy and toxicity
- Awards: Marvin J. Johnson Award,American Chemical Society; Elmer Gaden Award, American Chemical Society; Iowa Section Award, American Chemical Society
- Scientific career
- Fields: Bioengineering; Biocatalysis; Biomolecular Interaction; Metabolomics; Cell-based Microarrays; Nanobiotechnology; Magnetogenetics
- Workplaces: Rensselaer Polytechnic Institute
- Academic advisors: D.I.C. Wang; Alexander Klibanov

Jonathan S. Dordick (born January 15, 1959) is an institute professor of chemical and biological engineering at Rensselaer Polytechnic Institute and holds joint appointments in the departments of biomedical engineering and biological sciences. In 2008 he became director of the Center for Biotechnology and Interdisciplinary Studies. In 2012 Dordick became the vice president for research at RPI. He became Special Advisor to the RPI President for Strategic Initiatives in 2018,

Dordick was elected a member of the National Academy of Engineering in 2021 for contributions to methods for rapidly screening drug efficacy and toxicity, and biocatalytic technologies for improving human health.

== Background ==
Dordick received his B.A. degree in biochemistry and chemistry from Brandeis University and his Ph.D. from the Massachusetts Institute of Technology in biochemical engineering. In 1987, Dordick joined the department of chemical and biochemical engineering at the University of Iowa. He was promoted to associate professor in 1991, to full professor in 1994, and served as department chair from 1995 to 1998. In 1998, Dordick joined the faculty at Rensselaer Polytechnic Institute as chair of the department of chemical and biological engineering and the Howard P. Isermann Professor. He served as director of the Center for Biotechnology and Interdisciplinary Studies from 2008-2012 and as vice president for research at RPI from 2012 to 2018. Since 2018, Dordick has been the co-director of the Heparin Applied Research Center and the senior advisor to the Rensselaer president for strategic initiatives. Dordick is a member of the National Academy of Engineering and the National Academy of Inventors. He is a Fellow of the American Chemical Society, the American Association for the Advancement of Science, and the American Institute of Medical and Biological Engineers. He has received numerous awards, including the Amgen Award in Biochemical and Molecular Engineering, Food, Pharmaceutical and Bioengineering Award of the American Institute of Chemical Engineers, Marvin J. Johnson Award and the Elmer Gaden Award both of the American Chemical Society, the International Enzyme Engineering Award, and an NSF Presidential Young Investigator Award. He has cofounded several companies, including EnzyMed (now part of Albany Molecular Research, Inc.), Solidus Biosciences, Inc., and Redpin Therapeutics. He has also served on multiple White House-sponsored panels and committees in biomanufacturing. Dordick has published over 400 papers and is an inventor/co-inventor on nearly 50 patents and patent applications.

He is married to Vera. Dordick has a son, Samuel, and a daughter, Hannah.

== Research ==
Professor Dordick currently leads the Jonathan S. Dordick Research Group in the Center for Biotechnology and Interdisciplinary Studies and leads research in enzyme technology, microscale cell culture engineering, drug discovery and human toxicology, and biomanufacturing. Present and past research has included studies of Biocatalysis in Nonaqueous Media, Combinatorial Biocatalysis, Nanobiotechnology, enzyme technology, molecular bioprocessing. More specifically, they work on the development of enzymatic catalysis under extreme conditions (e.g. high salt concentrations), enzymes in the synthesis and modification of polymeric materials, combinatorial biocatalysis for drug discovery and polymer synthesis, and the generation of biocatalysts and biomimetics with unique activities and selectivities. Dordick has been featured in the news for helping develop the "MetaChip" technology for fast drug screening, and for research on gel nanomaterials that could be used to control the delivery of drugs. Most recently, Dordick has tackled COVID-19 by identifying mechanisms that interfere with SARS-CoV-2 entry into human cells. He identified the ability of heparin, a common blood thinner, to block the virus' ability to bind to its human receptor target. He then identified other highly sulfated polysaccharides, including those from seaweed, which also possessed very potent activity against viral infectivity in vitro.

== Honors ==
- Elected to the National Academy of Engineering (2021)
- Amgen Biochemical and Molecular Engineering Award (2019)
- Rensselaer School of Engineering Outstanding Professor Award (2019)
- Food, Pharmaceutical and Bioengineering Award, American Institute of Chemical Engineers (2016)
- Elected to the National Academy of Inventors (2014)
- Fellow of the American Chemical Society (2010)
- Marvin J. Johnson Award, American Chemical Society Division of Biochemical Technology (2007)
- Elmer Gaden Award, American Chemical Society Division of Biochemical Technology (2007)
- Fellow of the American Association for the Advancement of Science (2004)
- International Enzyme Engineering Award (2003)
- Fellow of the American Institute of Medical and Biological Engineers (1996)
- Chairman of the Division of Biochemical Technology of the American Chemical Society (1992)
- NSF Presidential Young Investigator Award (1989)
