= Jennifer Elisseeff =

Professor of biomedical engineering

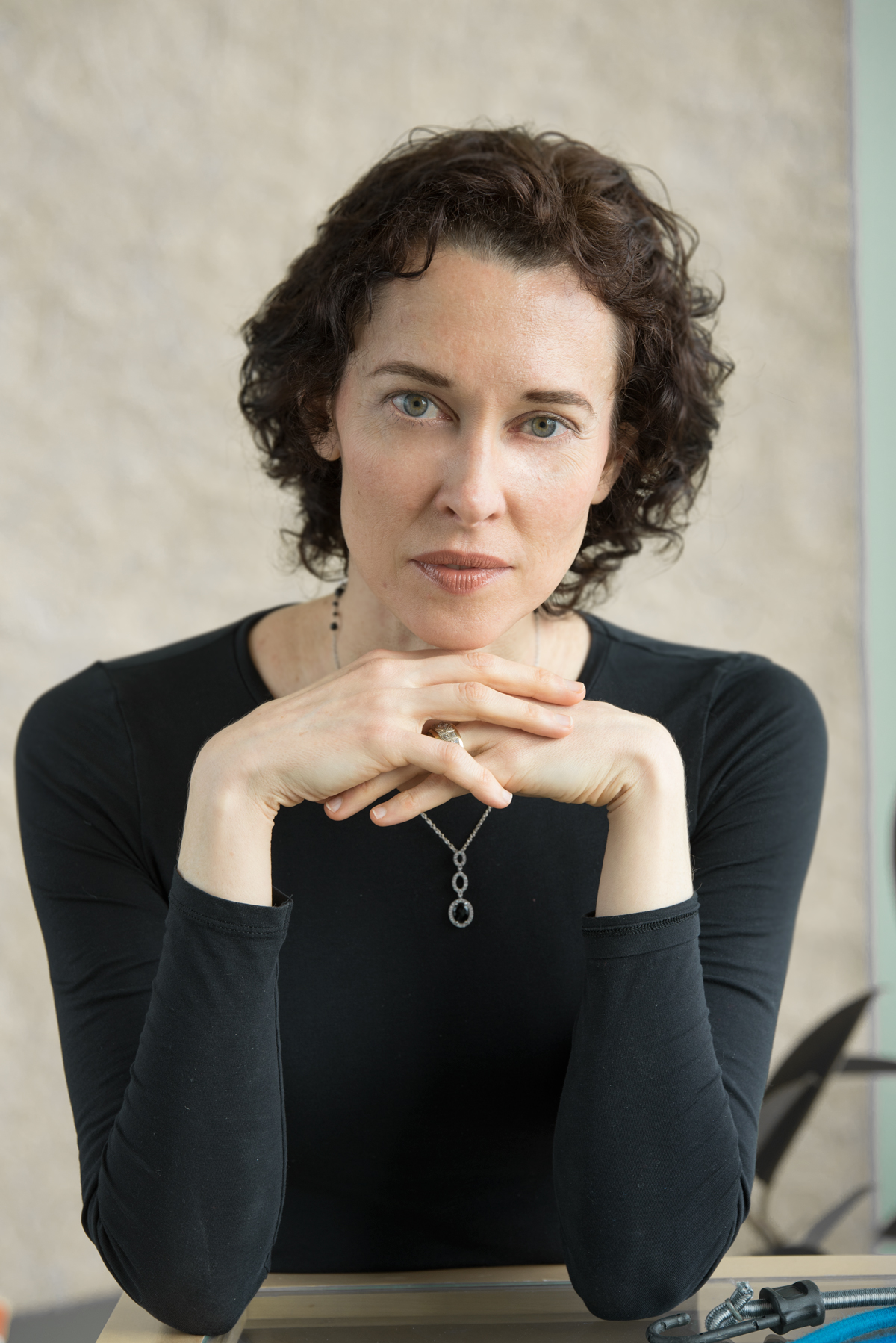
- Education: Massachusetts Institute of Technology, Carnegie Mellon University
- Scientific career
- Workplaces: Johns Hopkins University
- Thesis: Transdermal Photopolymerization of Hydrogels for Cartilage Tissue Engineering
- Doctoral advisor: Robert S. Langer
- Notable students: Kaitlyn Sadtler
- Website: elisseefflab.jhu.edu

Jennifer Hartt Elisseeff (/əˈliːsiɛf/; born September 25, 1973) is an American biomedical engineer and academic. She is the Morton Goldberg Professor and Director of the Translational Tissue Engineering Center at Johns Hopkins Department of Biomedical Engineering and the Wilmer Eye Institute with appointments in Chemical Engineering, Biomedical Engineering, Materials Science and Orthopedic Surgery. Elisseeff's research is in the fields of regenerative medicine and immunoengineering.

She was elected as a member of the National Academy of Sciences, National Academy of Engineering and National Academy of Medicine. She is also a Fellow of the American Institute for Medical and Biological Engineering, the National Academy of Inventors, and a Young Global Leader by the World Economic Forum. In 2019 she received the NIH Director's Pioneer Award. Her research has been cited over 28,000 times and she has an h-index over 85.

== Education and Academia ==
Elisseeff attended Carnegie Mellon University for her undergraduate education in chemistry with a focus on polymer science. She then undertook doctoral studies in the Harvard-MIT Division of Health Sciences and Technology under the mentorship of Robert Langer. Later she was a Fellow at the National Institute of General Medical Sciences, Pharmacology Research Associate Program, where she worked in the National Institute of Dental and Craniofacial Research.

She was originally hired by Johns Hopkins University as an assistant professor with joint appointments in biomedical engineering and orthopedic surgery in 2003. Originally named Jules Stein Professor of the Wilmer Eye Institute in 2010, Elisseeff is now Morton Goldberg Professor in the JHU Department of Biomedical Engineering and Director of her own lab. While at Hopkins, Elisseeff has pursued clinical development and translation of biomedical research.

In 2018, she was elected to the National Academy of Engineering for "development and commercial translation of injectable biomaterials for regenerative therapies." That same year, she was also elected to the National Academy of Medicine,

== Business career ==
In 2004, Elisseeff cofounded Cartilix, Inc., which was acquired by Biomet Inc in 2009. In 2009, she also founded Aegeria Soft Tissue and Tissue Repair. She serves on the Scientific Advisory Boards of Bausch and Lomb, Kythera Biopharmaceutical, and Cellular Bioengineering Inc. Elisseeff has also served on the board of the State of Maryland's Technology Development Corporation (TEDCO).

== Research ==
Elisseeff's current research group resides within the Johns Hopkins University Translational Tissue Engineering Center, undertaking translational research related to tissue engineering, ophthalmology and immunology. Beginning with the publication of a Science article in 2016, much of her group's research has pivoted to identifying the response of the immune system to implanted biomaterials and how biomaterial properties affect wound healing response.
