= Kathryn Whitehead =

American chemist

Kathryn Ann Whitehead
- Born: 1980 (age 45–46); Allentown, Pennsylvania
- Education: University of Delaware; University of California, Santa Barbara
- Scientific career
- Workplaces: Koch Institute for Integrative Cancer Research; Carnegie Mellon University
- Thesis: Safe and effective methods for improving the oral delivery of macromolecules (2007)
- Website: http://whitehead.cheme.cmu.edu

Kathryn Ann Whitehead (born 1980) is an American chemical engineer who is a professor at Carnegie Mellon University. Her research focuses on the engineering of nanomaterial-based drug delivery systems for gene therapy, oral macromolecular delivery systems, and maternal and infant therapeutics. She was elected as a Fellow of the American Institute for Medical and Biological Engineering in 2021 and as Fellow of the Controlled Release Society.

== Early life and education ==
Whitehead is from Allentown, Pennsylvania. She earned her bachelor's degree in chemical engineering at the University of Delaware, then moved to the University of California, Santa Barbara, where she studied methods to improve the oral delivery of macromolecules. Whitehead was a postdoctoral researcher at the Koch Institute for Integrative Cancer Research, where she worked alongside Robert S. Langer on RNA interference therapeutics.

== Research and career ==
Whitehead's research included the development of drug delivery systems for gene therapies. She is interested in the development of nanoparticle materials to deliver messenger RNA (mRNA) to specific cells. Targeted mRNA delivery provides physicians with a personalized strategy to treat genetic disorders. Alongside mRNA, Whitehead has studied small interfering RNA, which can be used to control gene expression. In general, mRNA promotes gene expression, whilst siRNA is used to silence over-expressed genes. She focuses on the development of delivery systems for leukocytes (including B cells) and intestinal epithelium. A challenge with using mRNA for therapeutic purposes is that the body often recognizes foreign mRNA and attacks it, triggering an immune response. She worked with Katalin Karikó and Drew Weissman on the development of the lipid nanoparticles that enabled the mRNA-based COVID-19 vaccines.

In an attempt to better design drug delivery systems, Whitehead has investigated the cellular components of breast milk. She is interested in whether it is possible to genetically engineer cells to treat children's allergies, or orally administer vaccines to infants.

Whitehead is passionate about science communication and improving public trust in science. In 2021, she delivered a TED talk on lipid nanoparticles and how mRNA will transform biology. In 2022, Whitehead delivered the convocation address at the Carnegie Mellon University.

== Awards and honors ==
- Elected Fellow of the American Institute for Medical and Biological Engineering
- DARPA Young Faculty Award
- Popular Science Brilliant Ten
- MIT Technology Review Innovator Under 35
- American Society for Engineering Education Curtis W. McGraw Research Award
- NIH Director's New Innovator Award

== Selected publications ==
- Kathryn A Whitehead; Langer, Robert Samuel; Daniel G Anderson (2009). "Knocking down barriers: advances in siRNA delivery". Nature Reviews Drug Discovery. 8 (2): 129–138. doi:10.1038/nrd2742. PMC 7097568. PMID 19180106. Wikidata Q37380671.
- Kathryn A Whitehead; J Robert Dorkin; Arturo J Vegas; et al. (2014). "Degradable lipid nanoparticles with predictable in vivo siRNA delivery activity". Nature Communications. 5: 4277. Bibcode:2014NatCo...5.4277W. doi:10.1038/ncomms5277. PMC 4111939. PMID 24969323. Wikidata Q33954008.
- Khalid A. Hajj; Kathryn A. Whitehead (2017). "Tools for translation: non-viral materials for therapeutic mRNA delivery". Nature Reviews Materials. 2 (10): 17056. doi:10.1038/natrevmats.2017.56. Wikidata Q56057560.
