= Graeme Henderson (scientist) =

British neuroscientist whose research focuses on opioid addiction

Graeme Henderson (born 1949) is a British neuroscientist whose research focuses on opioid addiction. He is professor of pharmacology in the School of Physiology, Pharmacology and Neuroscience, University of Bristol.

== Education and career ==
Graeme Henderson grew up in Glasgow, Scotland, and attended Shawlands Academy. He received his BSc in pharmacology from the University of Glasgow in 1971 and then studied for a PhD in the laboratory of John Hughes and Hans Kosterlitz at the University of Aberdeen, working on the effects of opiates on release of neurotransmitters. Following the award of his PhD in 1974 he worked with Richard Alan North in Aberdeen and at Loyola University of Chicago studying opioid activation of potassium channels in brain neurons. He was appointed to a lectureship at the University of Cambridge and to a fellowship of Sidney Sussex College in 1980. Along with Elizabeth Seward he demonstrated that opioid receptor activation inhibited the opening of voltage-gated calcium channels. In 1991 he was appointed to a chair of pharmacology and became head of the Department of Pharmacology at the University of Bristol.

== Research ==
Henderson's current research focuses on the mechanisms by which opioid drugs affect the central nervous system. In particular, his research group has studied the cellular mechanisms by which tolerance is developed to opioid drugs and how that tolerance may be reduced by other drugs such as ethanol and pregabalin enhancing the likelihood of opioid overdose.

== Academic leadership ==
He served as president of the British Pharmacological Society from 2006 to 2007 and as first vice president of the International Union of Basic and Clinical Pharmacology (IUPHAR) from 2010 to 2018. He is currently a member of the UK Government's Advisory Council on the Misuse of Drugs, and of the scientific committee of Drug Science since 2010.

== Honours and awards ==
- Wellcome Gold Medal, British Pharmacological Society 2019
- Honorary Fellow, British Pharmacological Society 2014
- Vane Medal, British Pharmacological Society 2013
- Founders’ Lecturer, International Narcotics Research Conference 2013
- Fellow, Royal Society of Biology 2011
- Sandoz Prize, British Pharmacological Society 1984

== Notable publications ==
- Johnson EA, Oldfield S... Henderson G (2006). Agonist-selective mechanisms of the μ-opioid receptor desensitization in human embryonic kidney 293 cells. Molecular Pharmacology. 70(2): pgs. 676-685
- Khakh BS, Henderson G (1998). ATP receptor-mediated enhancement of fast excitatory neurotransmitter release in the brain. Molecular Pharmacology. 54(2): pgs. 372-378
- Connor M, Yeo A, Henderson G (1996). The effect of nociceptin on Ca^{2+} channel current and intracellular Ca^{2+} in the SH-SY5Y human neuroblastoma cell line. British Journal of Pharmacology. 118(2): pgs. 205-207
- Waterfield AA, Smockcum RWJ... Henderson G (1977). In vitro pharmacology of the opioid peptides, enkephalins, and endorphins. European Journal of Pharmacology. 43(2): pgs. 107-116
- Henderson G, Hughes J, Kosterlitz HW (1972). A new example of a morphine-sensitive neuro-effector junction: adrenergic transmission in the mouse vans deferens. British Journal of Pharmacology. 46(4): pgs. 764-766
