= Thomas F. Edgar =

American chemical engineer

- Born: April 17, 1945 (age 81)
- Education: Princeton University; University of Kansas
- Known for: process modeling, control, and optimization
- Scientific career
- Fields: Chemical engineering
- Workplaces: University of Texas at Austin
- Doctoral advisor: Leon Lapidus
- Notable students: Juergen Hahn; John D. Hedengren

Thomas Flynn Edgar (born April 17, 1945) is an American chemical engineer.

He was elected a member of the National Academy of Engineering in 2014 for contributions to mathematical modeling, optimization, and automatic control of chemical and microelectronics processes.

He is the George T. and Gladys H. Abell Chair in Chemical Engineering at the University of Texas at Austin.

== Education ==
Edgar received his B.S. in chemical engineering in 1967 from the University of Kansas and his Ph.D. in chemical engineering in 1971 from Princeton University. He worked briefly as a process engineer with the Continental Oil Company before joining the UT's chemical engineering faculty in 1971. At UT-Austin, he served as Department Chair of Chemical Engineering (1985-93), Associate Dean of Engineering (1993-96), Associate Vice President for Academic Computing (1996-2001), and Director of the University of Texas at Austin Energy Institute(2012-2018.

== Academic career ==
Edgar’s academic work has focused on process modeling, control, and optimization. He has published over 500 articles and book chapters in the above fields applied to separations, chemical reactors, energy systems, and semiconductor manufacturing. He has supervised the research of over 45 M.S. and 80 Ph.D. students. He was co-founder of the Texas-Wisconsin-California Control Consortium which involves 13 companies and four universities. Edgar authored the textbook Coal Processing and Pollution Control Technology (Gulf Publishing, 1983) and co-authored the textbooks Optimization of Chemical Processes (McGraw-Hill, 2^{nd} ed, 2001) and Process Dynamics and Control (4^{th} ed, Wiley, 2016). The first edition of Process Dynamics and Control received the 1990 American Society of Engineering Education (ASEE) Meriam-Wiley Award as the top engineering textbook and the book (5^{th} ed., published 2025) has been used at over 80 universities in the U.S. He was the lead author for the Process Control section for the last two editions of Perry's Chemical Engineers' Handbook.

Edgar served as chair of the American Institute of Chemical Engineers' (AIChE) Computing and Systems Technology Division in 1986. He was President of the Computer Aids for Chemical Engineering Education (CACHE) Corporation from 1981 to 1984 and served as Executive Director of CACHE from 2001 to 2020. He was President of the American Automatic Control Council between 1989 and 1991, which oversees the control activities of eight U.S. professional societies. He was board secretary of Pecan Street, Inc. (Austin, TX) from 2010 to 2018 which deals with renewable energy and smart grids, and also served on the ABET Board of Directors (2011-2013) and was co-founder of the Smart Manufacturing Leadership Coalition in 2010. Edgar was a director of AIChE from 1989-92, and he was elected vice president of AIChE for 1996 and president for 1997. He was chair of the AIChE Foundation from 2002-2008. He was elected as vice-chair and chair of the Council for Chemical Research (1991-93). He served as a representative of AIChE on the Engineering Accreditation Commission from 2005-2010. He was founding general editor of the technical journal, In Situ, and has participated on six editorial boards and seven university advisory committees. He has been a consultant to several companies, including AMD, Texas Instruments, Emerson Process Management, Applied Materials, Dow Chemical, and Chemstations.

== Recognition ==
Edgar received the Outstanding AIChE Student Chapter Counselor Award in 1974, AIChE’s Colburn Award for research contributions in 1980 and Computing in Chemical Engineering Award in 1995, the AIChE Lewis Award in 2005, the F. J. & Dorothy Van Antwerpen Award in 2010, and the Research Excellence in Sustainable Engineering Award in 2013; the ASEE George Westinghouse Young Educator Award in 1988 and Union Carbide Chemical Engineering Division Lectureship in 1996; the 1992 John R. Ragazzini Award and 2015 Richard Bellman Control Heritage Award from the American Automatic Control Council; the 1993 Donald P. Eckman Education Award from ISA and the Pruitt Award from the Council for Chemical Research in 2009. He received the Joe J. King Professional Engineering Achievement Award from the University of Texas in 1989, the Distinguished Engineering Service Award from the University of Kansas in 1990, and the Control Engineering Prize from IFAC in 2005. He is listed in Who’s Who in America and Who’s Who in Engineering and is a Fellow of AIChE, IFAC, and ASEE. In 2007 he was selected by Control Magazine for the Process Automation Hall of Fame.
