= Leon Lapidus =

American chemist and chemical engineer

- Born: September 26, 1924
- Died: May 5, 1977 (aged 52)
- Education: University of Minnesota, Syracuse University
- Scientific career
- Fields: Chemical engineering
- Workplaces: Princeton University
- Doctoral advisor: Neal Amundson
- Doctoral students: Thomas F. Edgar; John H. Seinfeld

Leon Lapidus (September 26, 1924 – May 5, 1977) was an American chemist and chemical engineer, the chairman of the department of chemical engineering at Princeton University, a member of the National Academy of Engineering, an author of over 100 technical publications.

Lapidus was noted for his work in the application of computer techniques to chemical engineering for which he was honored with William H. Walker Award of the American Institute of Chemical Engineers. His distinctions included the William N. Lacey Lectureship, a membership in the American Chemical Society and in the American Institute of Chemical Engineers, Professional Progress Award in Chemical Engineering of the American Institute of Chemical Engineers.
