= Juergen Hahn =

American university professor

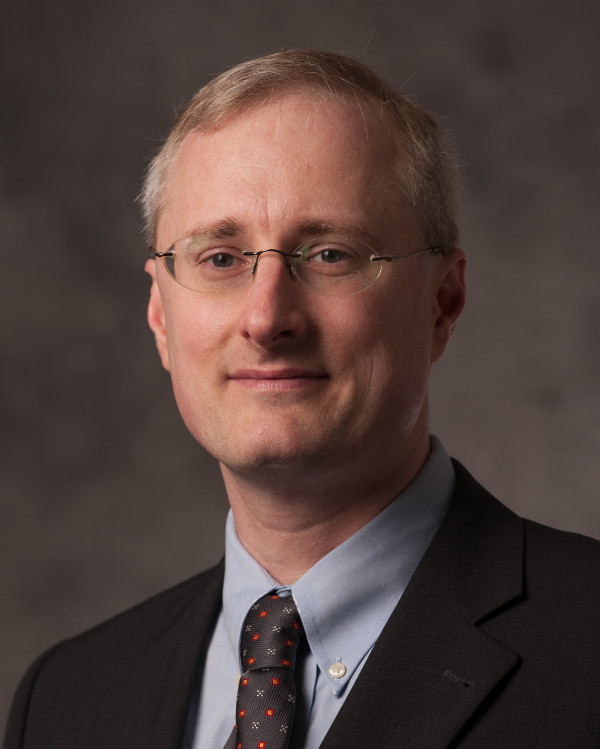
- Born: October 18, 1971 (age 54); Grevenbroich, Germany
- Education: University of Texas at Austin (MS, PhD); RWTH Aachen (Diploma)
- Known for: systems biology, process modeling and control
- Spouse: Mariah Hahn
- Scientific career
- Fields: Biomedical engineering Chemical engineering
- Workplaces: Rensselaer Polytechnic Institute; Texas A&M University
- Doctoral advisor: Thomas F. Edgar
- Website: https://www.hahnresearchgroup.com/

Juergen Hahn (born October 18, 1971) is an American engineering professor. His research focuses on computational systems biology with a specific emphasis on the development of data science approaches and their application to biological pathways relevant to the life sciences.

== Education ==
Hahn earned his undergraduate degree at the RWTH Aachen in Germany. During his undergraduate studies, he spent one year as a Fulbright Scholar at Texas A&M University. He moved to the University of Texas at Austin for his graduate studies, where he completed a master's degree and a doctorate. His doctoral research focused on the analysis of nonlinear systems for the purpose of identifying which parts of a model contribute the most to control-relevant behavior and need to be retained during a model reduction procedure. His doctoral studies were followed by post-doctoral research at the Chair of Process Systems Engineering at RWTH Aachen where his research focused on studying the effect of uncertainty in parameters on controlled nonlinear systems.

== Research and career ==
In 2003, Hahn joined Texas A&M University as an assistant professor, and was later promoted to the rank of associate professor (2009). His research at Texas A&M focused on the development and application of systems analysis approaches to biological networks with a particular emphasis on signaling pathways involved in inflammation. In 2012, Hahn moved to the Rensselaer Polytechnic Institute as a professor and became the head of the Biomedical Engineering Department in 2013. He was the longest-serving head in the history of this department by the time he stepped down in 2025. He has been serving as the Director of the Center for Biotechnology and Interdisciplinary Studies since 2024. His research focus at Rensselaer was on the application of systems concepts to the life sciences with a specific emphasis on the pathophysiology of autism.

Hahn won the American Institute of Chemical Engineers (AIChE) CAST Division Outstanding Young Researcher Award in 2010, was named a Fellow of the American Institute for Medical and Biological Engineering (AIMBE) in 2013, an AIChE Fellow in 2020, and a Biomedical Engineering Society (BMES) Fellow in 2022. He was elected a Trustee of Computer Aids for Chemical Engineering in 2014, served on the IEEE CSS Board of Governors in 2016, and was the Chair of the BMES Council of Chairs in 2024. He was elected to the European Academy of Sciences and Arts (EASA) in 2024 and formally inaugurated in 2025.

Hahn was an editor for the Journal of Process Control (2010–Present), Control Engineering Practice (2007–present), Automatica (2011 - 2014), Processes (2015 - 2020), Journal of Advanced Manufacturing and Processing (2020–present), Journal of Personalized Medicine (2022–present), and Optimal Control: Applications and Methods (2020–2023). He was conference chair for the 41st Northeast Bioengineering Conference and the 7th International Conference on Foundations of Systems Biology in Engineering.

== Personal life ==
Hahn is married to Mariah Hahn, a fellow biomedical engineer at RPI.
