= Julie Champion =

American chemist

- Education: University of California, Santa Barbara
- Scientific career
- Thesis: Engineering of polymeric particle morphology for applications in drug delivery (2007)
- Doctoral advisor: Samir Mitragotri

Julie Anne Champion is a professor of Chemical & Biomolecular Engineering who holds the William R. McLain Endowed Term Professorship at Georgia Institute of Technology. She is known for her work on biomaterials used for drug delivery.

== Education and career ==
Champion attended the University of Michigan, where she earned a Bachelor of Science degree in chemical engineering in 2001. After completing her undergraduate studies, Champion continued her education at the University of California, Santa Barbara, where she earned a Ph.D. in chemical engineering in 2007 under Samir Mitragotri. Following the completion of her Ph.D., Champion conducted postdoctoral research at the California Institute of Technology where she worked with David A. Tirrell. In 2009, Champion joined the faculty of the Georgia Institute of Technology. As of 2023 Champion is the William R. McLain Endowed Term Professorship.

== Research ==
Champion is known for her work on the development of biomaterials for use in drug delivery, tissue engineering, and regenerative medicine. Her doctoral research focused on the design and synthesis of polystyrene particles with different geometry and their impact to cellular uptake. More recently, her research includes work with nanoparticles investigating how to prevent bacterial growth on surfaces.

== Selected publications ==
- Champion, Julie A.; Mitragotri, Samir (2006-03-28). "Role of target geometry in phagocytosis". Proceedings of the National Academy of Sciences. 103 (13): 4930–4934. Bibcode:2006PNAS..103.4930C. doi:10.1073/pnas.0600997103. ISSN 0027-8424. PMC 1458772. PMID 16549762.
- Champion, Julie A.; Katare, Yogesh K.; Mitragotri, Samir (2007-08-16). "Particle shape: A new design parameter for micro- and nanoscale drug delivery carriers". Journal of Controlled Release. Fourth International Nanomedicine and Drug Delivery Symposium. 121 (1): 3–9. doi:10.1016/j.jconrel.2007.03.022. ISSN 0168-3659. PMC 4009069. PMID 17544538.
- Champion, Julie A.; Katare, Yogesh K.; Mitragotri, Samir (2007-07-17). "Making polymeric micro- and nanoparticles of complex shapes". Proceedings of the National Academy of Sciences. 104 (29): 11901–11904. doi:10.1073/pnas.0705326104. ISSN 0027-8424. PMC 1924596. PMID 17620615.

== Awards and honors ==
The American Chemical Society gave Champion their Rising Star Award in 2021. That same year she was named a fellow of the American Institute for Medical and Biological Engineering in recognition of her work on "the creation of materials made from therapeutic proteins that enable their delivery and function in immunomodulatory and cancer applications."
