= Joseph Kost =

Chemical engineering researcher

- יוסף קוסט
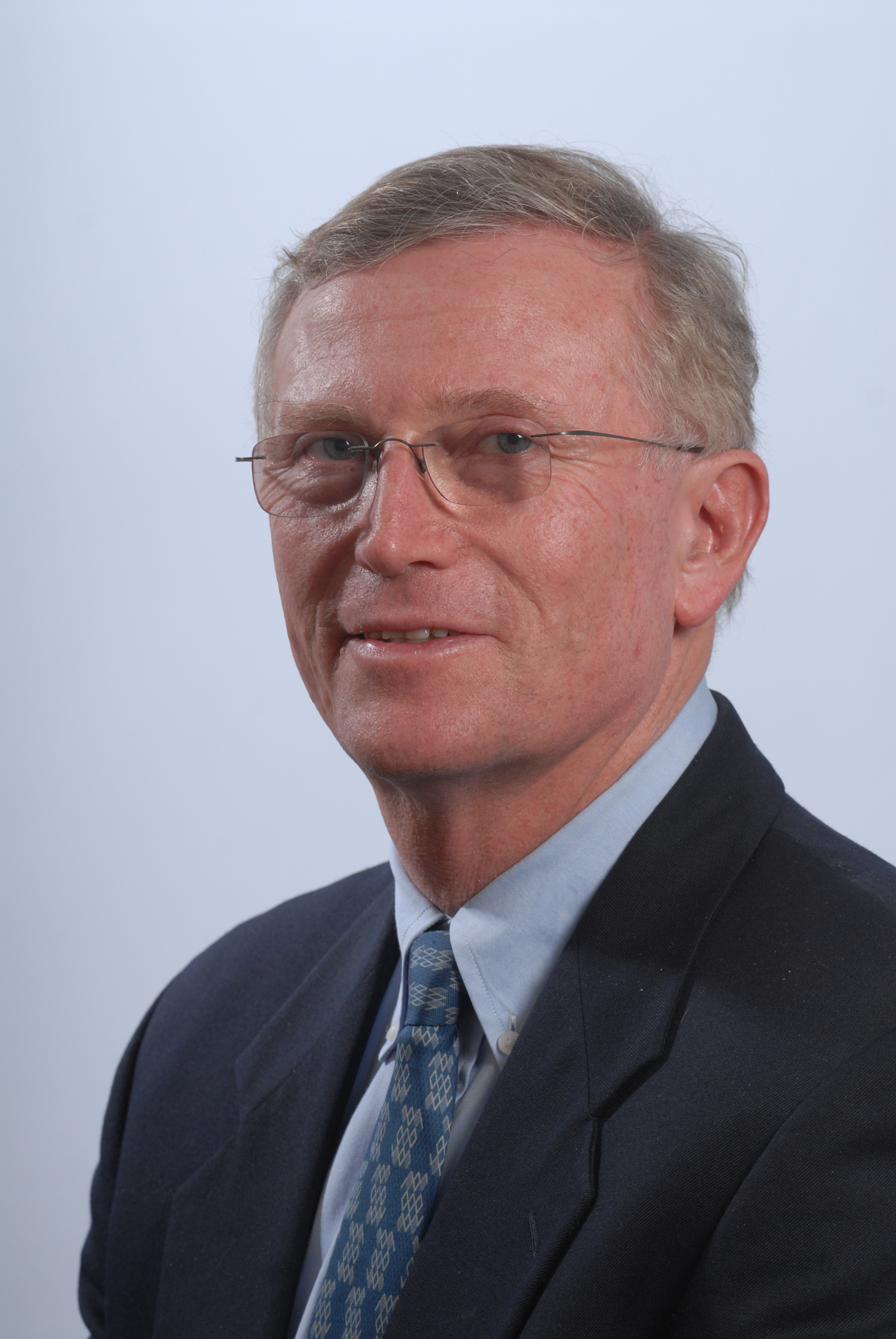
- Born: January 15, 1947 (age 79)
- Education: Technion - Israel Institute of Technology
- Scientific career
- Fields: Chemical Engineering Biomedical Engineering
- Workplaces: Ben-Gurion University of the Negev
- Doctoral advisor: Moshe Narkis
- Other academic advisors: Robert Langer
- Website: http://in.bgu.ac.il/en/iki/fta/Pages/JosephKost.aspx

Joseph Kost (Hebrew: יוסף קוסט; born January 15, 1947) is an Israeli academic, currently holder of The Abraham and Bessie Zacks Chair in Biomedical Engineering and the past Dean of the Faculty of Engineering Sciences at the Ben-Gurion University of the Negev.

== Early career ==
Kost completed undergraduate training in 1973, and obtained his M.Sc. in 1975, both at the Department of Chemical Engineering, D.Sc. in 1981 at the Department of Biomedical Engineering at the Technion – Israel Institute of Technology. He obtained his MBA in 2004 at the Ben-Gurion University School of Business Administration. He completed three years of Post-Doctoral training at the University of Washington, Harvard Medical School and Massachusetts Institute of Technology (MIT). Kost credits Bob Langer from MIT as an outstanding role model.

== Contribution to Biomedical Science ==
Kost has made significant contributions to the field of Biomedical Sciences. Coming from an engineering background, Kost has offered creative and unorthodox solutions to the field of drug delivery and non-invasive diagnostics. He has pioneered new medical technologies for disease management and was one of the pioneers developing artificial pancreas, studying polymeric system sensitive to glucose, and the entrapment of bone and Langerhans cells. Dr. Kost was the first to propose the ultrasonically modulated systems in which the release of drugs, from polymers or through synthetic or biological membranes, can be repeatedly modulated at will from a position external to the delivery system. His research impacts treatment of various diseases, including pain, diabetes, cardio-vascular diseases, and infectious diseases. Kost contributions are particularly noteworthy in the field of transdermal drug delivery. Transdermal drug delivery (through the skin) offers an attractive alternative to needles for systemic drug administration. However, the low permeability of the skin limits its applicability. Kost has come up with creative ways to open the skin for drug delivery without compromising safety. The approach is painless, non-intrusive, and a patient-friendly method for drug delivery. In 2004 the FDA approved Kost's and coworker's application for ultrasound based system for fast acting topical anesthetic. At that year Popular Science awarded the ultrasound system GRAND AWARD for "Best of What's New".

Based on the comprehensive studies of the ultrasound effect on mass transport, Kost proposed the use of the enhanced skin transport in the opposite direction to delivery, for the non-invasive continuous detection of blood analytes. The major focus has been the development of a non-invasive continuous detection of glucose. The first clinical study on diabetic volunteers was published by Kost et al. in Nature Medicine 2000. Since, Kost also proposed a novel approach for a glucose flux continuous biosensor and noninvasive detection of amniotic fluid for prenatal testing. Additional applications studied by Kost are the use of ultrasound for on-demand targeted delivery of drugs from liposomes, combined ultrasonic and enzymatic debridement of necrotic eschars and the use of ultrasound for more efficient cancer gene therapy. Nowadays, he study gene therapy approach for the treatment of psoriasis. The focus in these studies is on the effect of ultrasound on transport through tissues of no viral carriers developed by Kost complexed with miRNA. In addition to his studies on responsive controlled release systems: pH sensitive, glucose sensitive and calcium sensitive drug delivery Kost also developed a novel injectable delivery system to provide the body with a steady supply of tumor necrosis factor (TNF) receptor. The system is based on the principle that a water insoluble polymer, dissolved in a biocompatible solvent, will participate upon contact with physiological fluids. In 2012 a collaborative project entitled "Bio-inspired Nano-carriers for Sub-Cellular Targeted Therapeutics" of eleven research groups from Ben-Gurion University, Weizmann Institute of Science and The Hebrew University, led by Prof. Kost was approved in the framework of the National 5-year Nano-Science and Technology Program. The goal has been to study the intracellular transport phenomena in attempt to develop approaches for intracellular targeting of drugs for the treatment of cancer, diabetes, autophagy and obesity.

== Academic and related positions ==
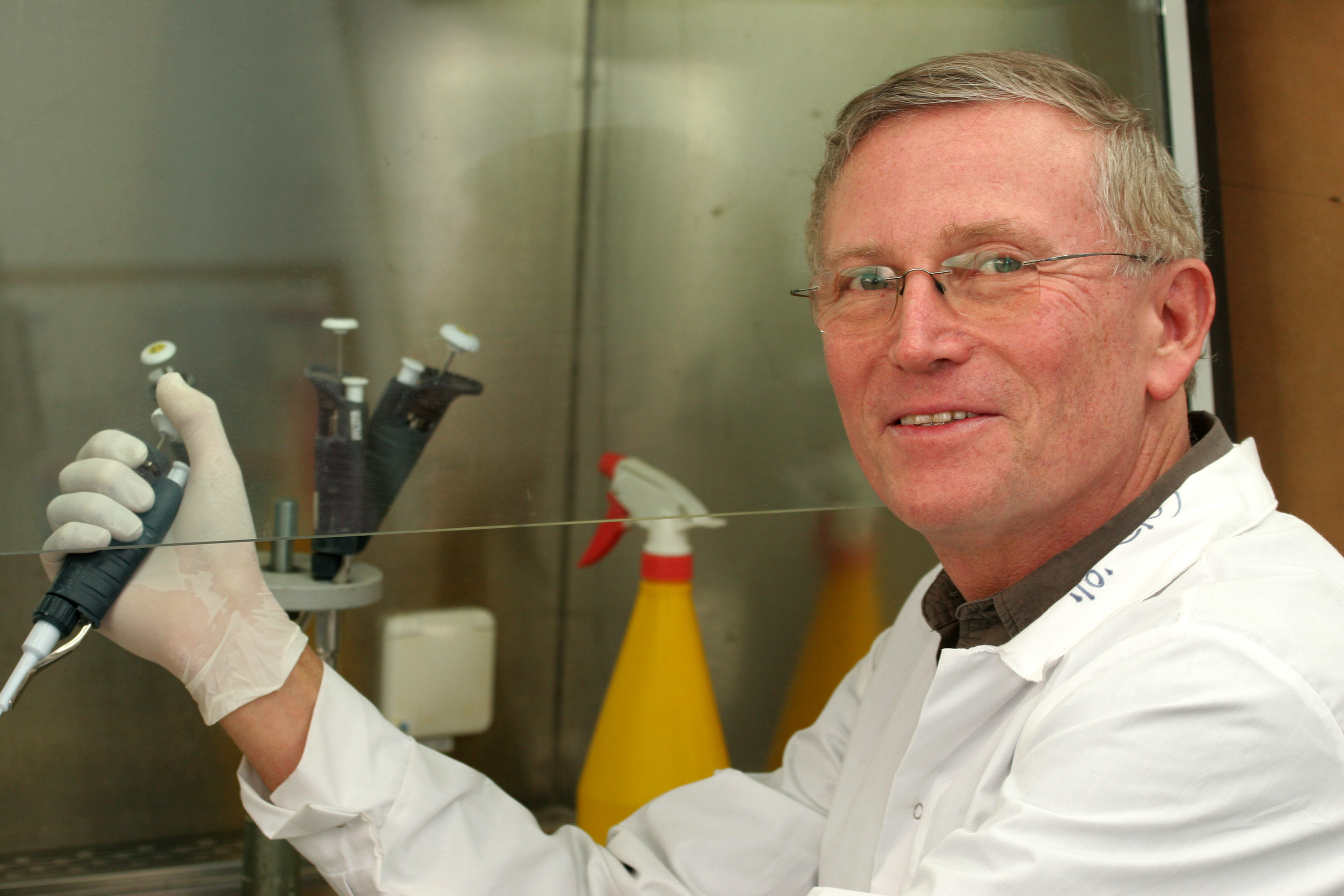
Prof. Joseph Kost

At the Ben-Gurion University of the Negev, Kost was the Head of the Center for Biomedical Engineering 1988-1993, and Head of the Program for Biotechnology Engineering from 1993 to 1995. These have been major centers for bioengineering research at the Ben-Gurion University. Head of the Department of Chemical Engineering 2010-2011 and since 2011 Dean of the Faculty of Engineering Sciences (11 Engineering Departments 5 Units 190 Professors and more than 5000 students) Kost was one of the pioneers who started the Journal Tissue Engineering and has served on its Editorial Board since its inception in 1994; also served on the Board of Biomaterials and the Journal of Controlled Release, and continues serving on Diabetes Technology & Therapeutics, Reviews in Chemical Engineering, Recent Patents on Endocrine Metabolic & Immune Drug Discovery, Recent Patents on Drug Delivery & Formulation and Open Pharmacology Journal. He has published four books, 37 book chapters, 113 papers, and more than 55 patents, principally in the area of Bio-Engineering Sciences. In 1995 Kost founded the Israeli Society for Controlled Delivery of Bio-Materials (more than 300 members), which is also the Israeli chapter of the International Controlled Release Society and was elected as its first President.

== Awards and honors ==
1996 Juludan Prize for Outstanding Scientific Research Achievements, Technion - Israel Institute of Technology.

1996 President of the Israel Society for Controlled Delivery of Bio-Materials and the Israeli Chapter of the Controlled Release Society (1996-1998).

1998 Fellow of the American Institute for Medical and Biological Engineering.

1998 Clemson Award for Applied Research in Recognition of the Outstanding Contributions to Applied Biomaterials Research, Society for Biomaterials.

2004 Popular Science announced SonoPrep as the best new product for "personal health". (SonoPrep technology has been invented and developed by Kost and coworkers).

2005 Jacqueline Seroussi 2005 Award for Cancer Research in recognition of the project entitled: Ultrasound for efficient non-viral sustained gene therapy of breast cancer.

2006 President of the Israel Institute of Chemical Engineers.

2007 Elected a Foreign Member of the US National Academy of Engineering (NAE) for discoveries that led to ultrasonic drug release and self-regulated drug delivery systems.

2008 President's Prize for Outstanding Scientific Achievements, Ben-Gurion University.

2010 Incumbent of the Abraham and Bessie Zacks Chair in Biomedical Engineering.

2012 Honorary Fellow of the Israel Institute of Chemical Engineers.

2014 Induction into the Controlled Release Society College of Fellows.

2015 Elected a Member of The Israel Academy of Sciences and Humanities.

2016 Ben-Gurion University Distinguished Professor.

2016 The Israeli Chapter of the Controlled Release Society Award for Outstanding Achievement in Drug Delivery, in recognition of his pioneering work in the field of Ultrasound-Based Drug Delivery Systems.
