= Jeffrey Karp =

Canadian biomedical engineer

Jeff Karp
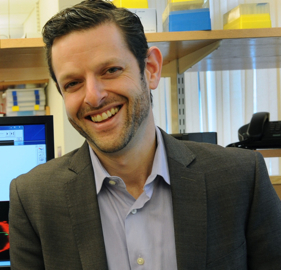
- Jeffrey Karp
- Born: 1975 (age 50–51)
- Education: McGill University, University of Toronto, Massachusetts Institute of Technology
- Scientific career
- Fields: Biomedical engineering
- Workplaces: Harvard Medical School, Massachusetts Institute of Technology
- Doctoral advisor: John Davies & Molly Shoichet
- Other academic advisors: Robert S. Langer

Jeffrey Karp (born 1975) is a Canadian biomedical engineer working as a Professor of Medicine at Harvard Medical School, Brigham and Women's Hospital, and the principal faculty at the Harvard Stem Cell Institute and Affiliate Faculty at the Massachusetts Institute of Technology through the Harvard–MIT Division of Health Sciences and Technology. He is also an affiliate faculty at the Broad Institute.

== Education ==
Karp was born and raised in Peterborough, Ontario. He graduated from McGill University in 1999 with a degree in chemical engineering. While at McGill he also co-founded the McGill Engineering Code of Ethics "The Blueprint".

He received a Ph.D. in Chemical and Biomedical Engineering from the University of Toronto in 2004.

From 2004 until 2006, Karp was a postdoctoral fellow in Robert Langer's laboratory at MIT in the Harvard–MIT Program of Health Sciences and Technology; Karp had applied for the position but Langer had no funds to pay him, so Karp secured funding from the Natural Sciences and Engineering Research Council and Langer accepted him.

== Research ==
In the Langer lab, Karp was inspired by another lab's publication in Nature that described adhesives based on the way that gecko's feet stick to surfaces; he and Langer applied for funding from NSF to make medical adhesives based on geckos, and received the funding.

In 2007 he received an appointment and his own lab at Brigham and Women’s Hospital, at a location near MIT; he retained his association with the Harvard–MIT HST program. He has made mentoring high school students, undergraduates, PhD students, and post docs a priority, and in 2008 he won the Outstanding Undergraduate Student Mentor Award at MIT, and in 2010 he won the Thomas A. McMahon Mentoring Award from the HST program.

In 2013 the company Gecko Biomedical was founded based on the gecko adhesive work, as well as subsequent work done in the Karp lab based on secretions of sandcastle worms.

In 2014 the company Skintifique was formed to commercialize a barrier cream Karp had invented to prevent skin reactions in people with nickel allergy.

In 2015 the company Frequency Therapeutics was founded to create treatments for hearing loss based on work done by Langer and Karp inspired by the ability of some amphibians and birds to regrow hair cells that have been damaged.

In 2016 the company Alivio Therapeutics was founded based on work by Langer and Karp on a hydrogel to deliver drugs, intended to stick to tissue and only release the drug in response to inflammation.

In 2024 Karp published the book LIT - Life Ignition Tools, a framework that helps people shift from autopilot to purposeful living by using simple, science-based practices drawn from nature and neuroscience. LIT is all about resensitizing our aliveness through intercepting routine patterns to actively think and decide versus just jumping in with the habitual responses.

== Recognition ==
Technology Review listed him in 2008 as one of the top innovators under the age of 35 (TR35). Karp received the 2011 Young Investigator award from the Society for Biomaterials, and also in 2011, the Boston Business Journal profiled him as a Champion in Health Care Innovation.
