= Shulamit Levenberg =

Israeli scientist

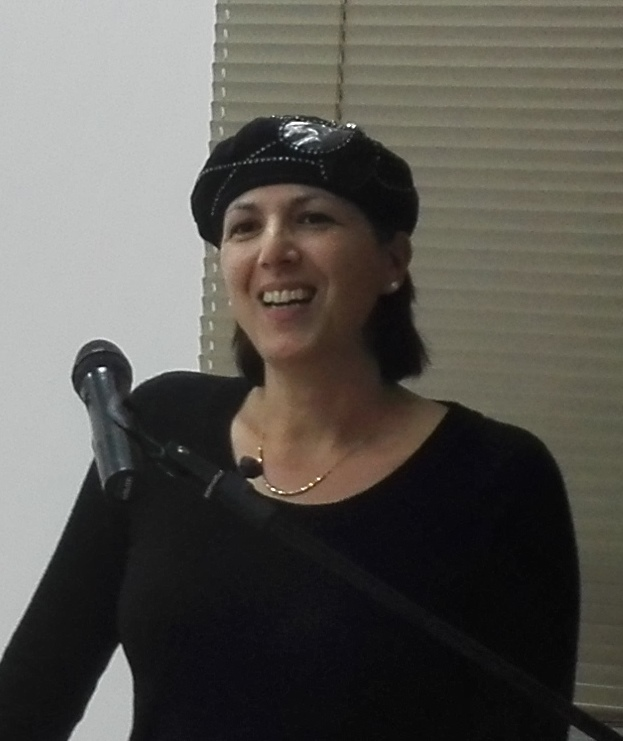
- Prof. Shulamit Levenberg, 2018
- Known for: Research on the engineering of human tissue constructs Production of cultured meat

Shulamit Levenberg (born 1969 in Israel) is an Israeli professor of Biomedical Engineering at the Technion - Israel Institute of Technology. She is the head of the Stem Cell and Tissue Engineering Laboratory and served as the Dean of the Faculty of Biomedical Engineering from 2016 to 2020. Her research focuses on tissue engineering from stem cells, vascularization of engineered tissues, and cell differentiation on polymeric scaffolds.

== Biography and academic career ==
Levenberg attended the Ulpanat Kfar Pines high school and completed her national service as a tour guide at a field school in Jerusalem. She earned her Bachelor of Science (B.Sc.) in Biology from the Faculty of Medicine at the Hebrew University of Jerusalem. She then completed a direct Ph.D. track in Molecular Cell Biology at the Feinberg Graduate School of the Weizmann Institute of Science under the supervision of Professor Benjamin Geiger.

Following her doctorate, she conducted her post-doctoral research at the Massachusetts Institute of Technology (MIT). She worked at MIT for five years as a research associate in the lab of Professor Robert Langer. In 2011–2012, she spent a sabbatical year as a visiting professor at Harvard University.

== Research and scientific work ==
Levenberg conducts interdisciplinary research focused on stem cells and tissue engineering. She is the head of the Stem Cell and Tissue Engineering Laboratory and also serves as the director of the Technion Center for 3D Bioprinting. Her pioneering work focuses on the in vitro vascularization of engineered tissues to improve the survival and perfusion of engineered grafts upon implantation. Her laboratory was the first to engineer vascularized tissue flaps, offering novel reconstruction techniques using engineered tissue constructs. Additionally, her research investigates the effects of scaffold stiffness and mechanical tensile forces on the early differentiation and 3D organization of stem cells on biodegradable polymeric scaffolds. She has also developed unique stem-cell engineered tissue constructs aimed at inducing the regeneration and repair of injured spinal cords. Levenberg's lab utilizes these complex tissue models to deepen the understanding of various disease mechanisms and to improve tissue repair applications, including bone and muscle reconstruction.

== Entrepreneurship and commercial ventures ==
In addition to her academic research, Levenberg is a prominent figure in the biotechnology and food technology sectors, translating laboratory innovations into commercial applications. In 2017, she co-founded Aleph Farms, a cellular agriculture company, alongside the food-tech incubator "The Kitchen Hub" of Strauss Group and entrepreneur Didier Toubia. Serving as the company's Chief Scientific Advisor, she leveraged her extensive expertise in 3D bioprinting and tissue engineering to help develop the world's first slaughter-free cultivated steak grown on a plant protein matrix. Beyond her work in cellular agriculture, Levenberg has expanded her entrepreneurial ventures into the medical and diagnostics fields. She is the Co-founder and Scientific Advisory Board member of NurExone Biologics, which focuses on translational applications for spinal cord regeneration. Additionally, she co-founded NanoSynex, a medical technology company utilizing a microfluidic nanoliter droplet platform developed in her lab for rapid antimicrobial susceptibility testing.

== Awards and recognition ==
Levenberg has received numerous prestigious national and international awards for her scientific contributions. In 2006, she was named a "Research Leader" in tissue engineering by Scientific American as part of their Top 50 scientists list.

In 2018, she received the Rappaport Prize for Biomedical Research in the Senior Researcher category. She was awarded the Bruno Memorial Award in 2019.

In 2022, she was featured in Forbes magazine's "50 Over 50" list for Europe, the Middle East, and Africa. Most recently, in 2023, she was elected as a Fellow of the American National Academy of Inventors (NAI).

== Personal life ==
Levenberg is married to Yehuda, and they have six children. They live in Moreshet, a communal settlement in the Misgav Regional Council in the Lower Galilee region of Israel.
