= Burt Hill Architects =

American architectural firm

Burt, Hill & Associates Burt Hill Kosar Rittelmann Burt Hill Architects

Practice information
- Partners: Ralph H. Burt AIA; Alva L. Hill AIA; John E. Kosar AIA; P. Richard Rittelmann FAIA
- Founders: Ralph H. Burt AIA; Alva L. Hill AIA
- Founded: 1968
- Dissolved: 2010
- Location: Butler, Pennsylvania

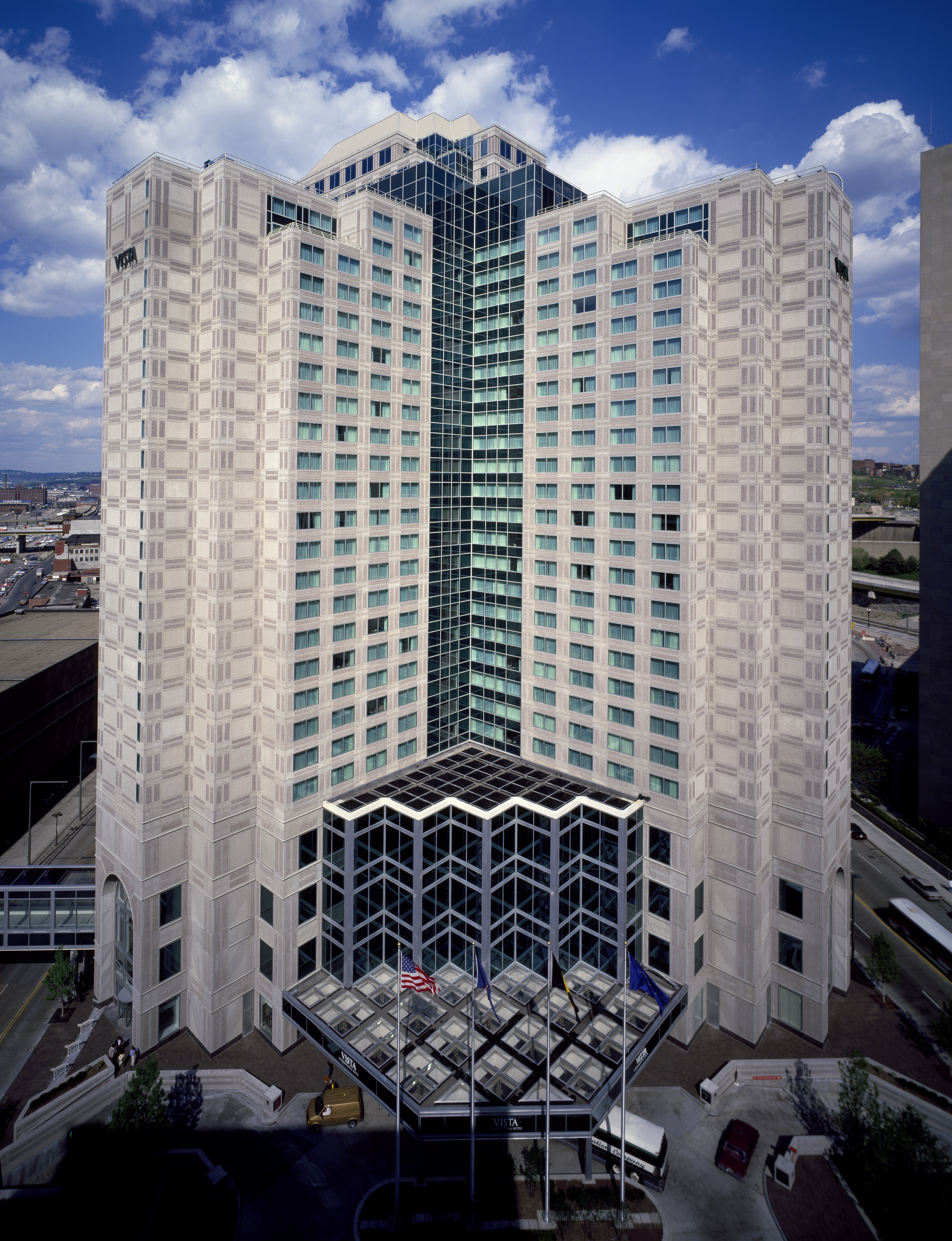
The Westin Convention Center Pittsburgh of Liberty Center, completed in 1986.

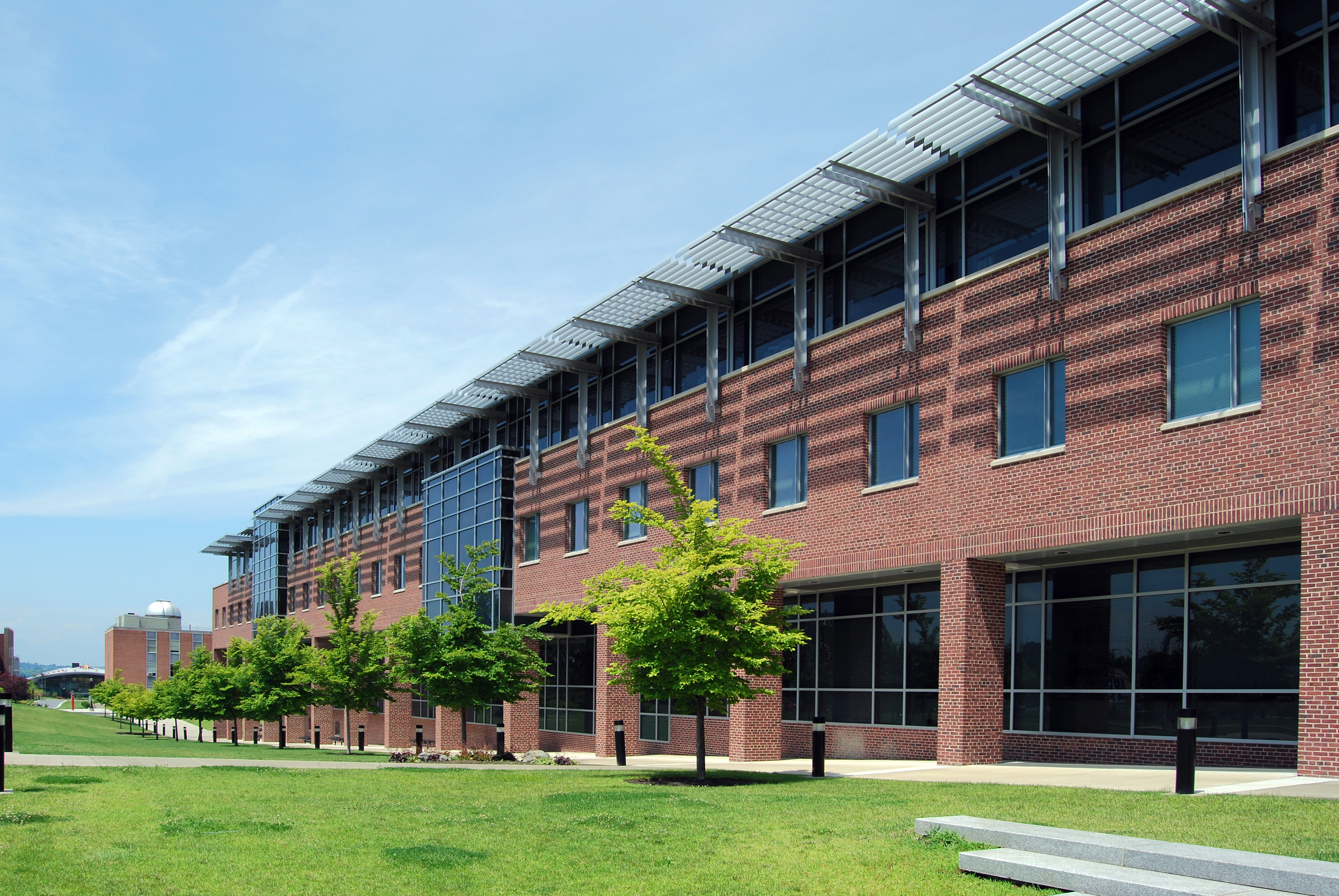
The Center for Biotechnology and Interdisciplinary Studies of the Rensselaer Polytechnic Institute, completed in 2006.

Burt Hill Architects was an American architectural firm active, under several names, in Butler and Pittsburgh, Pennsylvania, and elsewhere from 1968 until its 2010 acquisition by Stantec.

== History and principals ==
Burt Hill Architects was founded in 1968 in Butler, Pennsylvania, as a successor to the practice of G. Edwin Howard, a regionally prominent architect. Architects Ralph H. Burt Jr. (1923–2005) and Alva L. Hill Jr. (1920–2015) were both natives of Pennsylvania and attended the Carnegie Institute of Technology in Pittsburgh with the class of 1952 before joining Howard & Murphy in Butler. In 1958 they became partners in the reorganized Howard, Burt & Hill. In 1966 the firm was incorporated, and in 1968 Howard retired. Burt and Hill continued the firm as Burt, Hill & Associates. Under Burt and Hill's leadership the firm rapidly expanded, opening offices in Pittsburgh in 1971 and Fort Myers, Florida, in 1973. In 1978 it was reorganized as Burt Hill Kosar Rittelmann Associates to reflect the admission of John E. Kosar and P. Richard Rittelmann (1938–2015) to the partnership.

In the 1970s the office became noted for solar design under the leadership of Burt and his associate, Rittelmann. Their first major project in this area was the retrofitting of the 1962–built George A. Towns Elementary School in Atlanta with a solar heating and cooling system in association with the Westinghouse Electric Corporation in 1975. This has been removed but in its time was the largest such installation in the United States. Another large solar project was Comstock Center in Pittsburgh, completed in 1985.

Burt and Hill retired in 1989, but the firm continued to expand. By the early 1990s it had additional offices in Philadelphia, Washington, D.C., and Houston and was noted as the largest architectural firm in Western Pennsylvania. In 1998 the firm expanded internationally with an office in Dubai, followed by an office in India. Undertaking this expansion was Ar. Jayesh Hariyani, Director Burt Hill (India). In 2005 the firm was renamed a final time to Burt Hill Architects. The firm invested heavily in its international practice, and faltered when the 2008 financial crisis led to the suspension of many proposed projects in the Persian Gulf. In 2010 it was acquired by Edmonton–based Stantec, which still (2023) maintains offices in Butler and Pittsburgh and a large practice in Western Pennsylvania.

== Architectural works ==
- Butler YMCA, 339 N Washington St, Butler, Pennsylvania (1968)
- Trinity Middle School, 50 Scenic Dr, Washington, Pennsylvania (1972)
- Butler Intermediate High School, 551 Fairground Hill Rd, Butler, Pennsylvania (1973)
- The Landings, 4420 Flagship Dr, Fort Myers, Florida (1973)
- George A. Towns Elementary School retrofitting, 760 Bolton Rd NW, Atlanta (1975)
- Morgan Center, (Note: Since 1978 this building has been the home of the Butler office of Burt Hill and Stantec.) 101 E Diamond St, Butler, Pennsylvania (1978)
- Two Chatham Center, 112 Washington Pl, Pittsburgh (1980–81)
- American Philatelic Society headquarters (former), 100 Oakwood Ave, State College, Pennsylvania (1982)
- Comstock Center, 912 Fort Duquesne Blvd, Pittsburgh (1985)
- Liberty Center, (Note: Designed in association with Urban Design Associates of Pittsburgh and The Architects Collaborative of Cambridge, Massachusetts.) Pittsburgh (1986)
  - Federated Tower, 1001 Liberty Ave
  - Westin Convention Center Pittsburgh, 1000 Penn Ave
- Park Avenue Condominiums, 750 Park Ave NE, Atlanta (2000)
- Broadway Plaza, 15 1st St SE, Rochester, Minnesota (2004)
- Center for Biotechnology and Interdisciplinary Studies, Rensselaer Polytechnic Institute, Troy, New York (2004)
- Eastern Michigan University Student Center, Eastern Michigan University, Ypsilanti, Michigan (2006)
