= Henry A. Lester =

American biologist

Henry A. Lester is an American biologist, currently the Bren Professor at California Institute of Technology.

He received an A.B. from Harvard College in 1966 and a Ph.D. from Rockefeller University in 1971.
