= List of cancer hospitals =

This is a list of specialist hospitals for treatment of cancer.

== Cancer Hospitals ==
=== Australia ===
- Peter MacCallum Cancer Centre
- Victorian Comprehensive Cancer Centre

=== Bangladesh ===
- National Institute of Cancer Research and Hospital

=== Brazil ===
- Institute of Cancer of São Paulo

=== Canada ===
- Arthur J.E. Child Comprehensive Cancer Centre
- Princess Margaret Cancer Centre
- Abbotsford Regional Hospital and Cancer Centre
- Dr. Georges-L.-Dumont University Hospital Centre
- Cross Cancer Institute

=== China ===
- Cancer Hospital, Chinese Academy of Medical Sciences
- Fuda Cancer Hospital-Guangzhou
- Shanghai Cancer Center
- Sun Yat-sen University Cancer Center
- Zhejiang Cancer Hospital

=== Denmark ===
- Finsen Laboratory

=== Egypt ===
- Borg El Arab University Hospital
- Children's Cancer Hospital Egypt
- National Cancer Institute

=== Finland ===
- Docrates Cancer Center

=== France ===
- Hôpital Saint-Louis – founded in Reims in 1742. This was the first cancer hospital in the world. It was initially on the Rue de Saint-Denis with two beds funded by a bequest of the canon, Jean Godinot.
- Oeuvres du Calvaire – founded in Lyon in 1850 for women

=== Japan ===
- Cancer Institute Hospital of JFCR
- Kanagawa Cancer Center

=== Jordan ===
- King Hussein Cancer Center

=== Pakistan ===
- Institute of Nuclear Medicine, Oncology and Radiotherapy
- Institute of Radiotherapy and Nuclear Medicine
- Karachi Institute of Radiotherapy and Nuclear Medicine
- Nuclear Medicine, Oncology and Radiotherapy Institute
- Shaukat Khanum Memorial Cancer Hospital and Research Centre

=== Singapore ===
- Raffles Hospital
- Parkway East Hospital - Parkway Cancer Centre
- Gleneagles Hospital - Parkway Cancer Centre
- Tan Tock Seng Hospital
- Singapore General Hospital
- KK Women's and Children's Hospital
- Mount Elizabeth Hospital - Parkway Cancer Centre
- National Cancer Centre
- National University Hospital
- Changi General Hospital

=== Sri Lanka ===
- National Cancer Institute

=== Sweden ===
- Radiumhemmet

=== Taiwan ===
- Koo Foundation Sun Yat-Sen Cancer Center - founded in 1990 as Taiwan's first free-standing cancer center

=== United Kingdom ===
- Royal Marsden Hospital – founded in Westminster in 1851 as the Free Cancer Hospital – the first in the UK
- Christie Hospital – founded in Manchester in 1892 as the Cancer Pavilion and Home for Incurables
- Velindre Cancer Centre
- Beatson West of Scotland Cancer Centre

=== United States ===
- New York Cancer Hospital – founded in 1884 as the first cancer hospital in the USA
- Alvin J. Siteman Cancer Center
- Cancer Treatment Centers of America, Atlanta - Opened in 2012 in Goodyear, Arizona
- Cancer Treatment Centers of America, Chicago - Opened in 1988 in Zion, Illinois
  - Cancer Treatment Centers of America, Downtown Chicago - Opened in 2018 in Chicago, Illinois
  - Cancer Treatment Centers of America, Gurnee - Opened in 2018 in Gurnee, Illinois
- Cancer Treatment Centers of America, Philadelphia - Opened in 2005 in Philadelphia, Pennsylvania
- Cancer Treatment Centers of America, Phoenix - Opened in 2008 in Gilbert, Arizona
  - Cancer Treatment Centers of America, Gilbert - Opened in 2018 in Phoenix, Arizona
  - Cancer Treatment Centers of America, North Phoenix - Opened in 2018 in Phoenix, Arizona
  - Cancer Treatment Centers of America, Scottsdale - Opened in 2018 in Scottsdale, Arizona
- Cancer Treatment Centers of America, Tulsa - Opened in 1990 in Tulsa, Oklahoma

=== Uruguay ===
- Fundación Pérez Scremini

=== Zimbabwe ===
- Oncocare
