= Mayo Clinic Florida =

Hospital in Jacksonville, Florida

- Mayo Clinic

- Pond in the center of the Mayo Clinic Jacksonville Campus

Geography
- Location: 4500 San Pablo Road, Jacksonville, Florida, United States
- Coordinates: 30.264458°N 81.4423191°W

Organization
- Care system: Private, non-profit 501(c)(3)
- Type: General medical and surgical
- Affiliated university: Mayo Medical School; Mayo Graduate School; Mayo School of Health Sciences

Services
- Beds: 419

History
- Founded: 1986

Links
- Website: www.mayoclinic.org/patient-visitor-guide/florida
- Lists: Hospitals in Florida

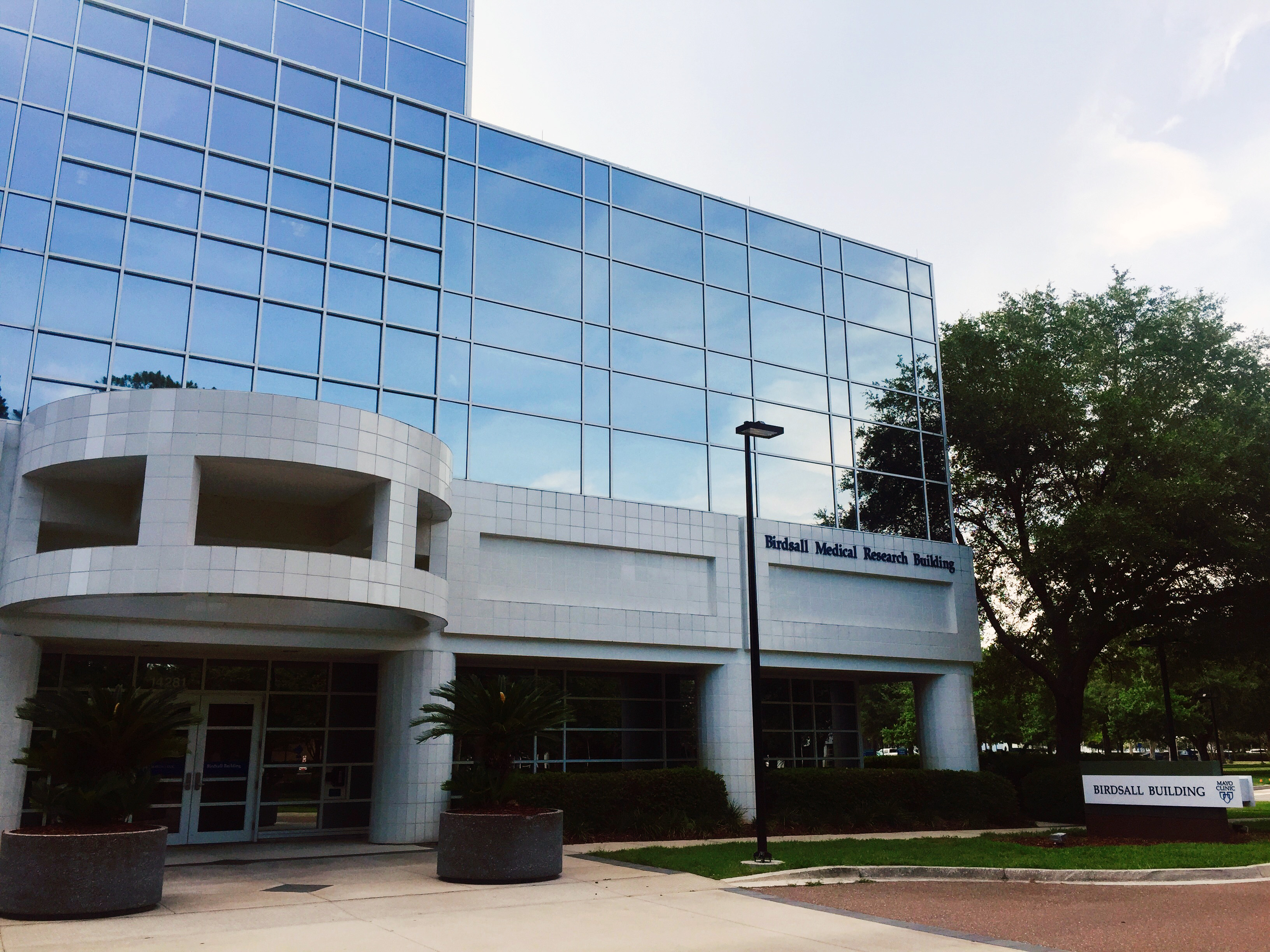
Birdsall Medical Research Building located at the Mayo Clinic Jacksonville campus

Mayo Clinic Florida is a comprehensive medical center belonging to the Mayo Clinic in Jacksonville, Florida. It is one of three Mayo campuses along with Phoenix/Scottsdale, Arizona and Rochester, Minnesota.

Mayo's campus is situated on 600 acres located near the intersection of San Pablo Road and J. Turner Butler Boulevard, an expressway which serves as a major thoroughfare to and from the Jacksonville Beaches.

Mayo Florida houses the first Particle therapy system in the western hemisphere, capable of delivering both carbon ions and protons to a single cancer tumor. Mayo's Florida Transplant Center also completed its 10,000th organ transplant earlier in 2026.

== History ==
=== Establishment and growth ===
Impressed by the medical treatment received by members of Jacksonville's Davis family (then owners of the Winn-Dixie supermarket chain) at Mayo Clinic in Minnesota, they rallied community and corporate support to bring Mayo Clinic to Jacksonville and donated a 392-acre parcel off San Pablo Road on which Mayo Clinic opened an outpatient consultation center on October 6, 1986. This was the first time Mayo Clinic established a location outside of Rochester, Minnesota. With an initial complement of 35 physicians and 145 support personnel, it grew to more than 7,800 total staff over the following 35 years. In 2022, Mayo obtained an additional 210 acres of undeveloped land situated immediately north of its existing property from the Davis family, thereby increasing the total campus size to 602 acres.

=== Mayo Clinic Hospital ===
In 1987, Mayo Clinic purchased St. Luke's Hospital, Florida's oldest private hospital (which is also located off J. Turner Butler Boulevard, about 10 miles away from Mayo's San Pablo Road campus) to serve as the admitting hospital for Mayo's Jacksonville location. In 2001, after experiencing significant growth in Jacksonville, Mayo Clinic announced its intention to build a hospital on its San Pablo Road campus. The hospital opened in 2008 and created 304 beds and 22 operating rooms, offering care in more than 35 medical and surgical specialties. Mayo then sold St. Luke's hospital to St. Vincent's HealthCare, which renamed it St. Vincent's Medical Center Southside. Mayo Clinic Hospital is one of three teaching hospitals in Jacksonville, along with UF Health Jacksonville, located in North Jacksonville, and Wolfson Children's Hospital in downtown Jacksonville.

An expansion announced in 2022 will increase the total number of beds from 304 to 428 in 2026.

== Services ==
A large variety of medical services a patient may need are available at Jacksonville's Mayo Clinic including doctor's visits, testing, surgery, organ transplants, emergency care and hospital care. Mayo also operates a primary care network with locations in Southside Jacksonville, Jacksonville Beach, and St. Augustine, as well as a community engagement and research outreach facility in Downtown Jacksonville.

=== Rankings ===
Mayo Clinic Florida was named to the U.S. News & World Report Best Hospitals 2026–2027 Honor Roll as a top 20 national hospital (ranking inside the top 20 overall), and has been ranked No.1 in the state of Florida and in the Jacksonville metro area as part of U.S. News & World Report’s “Best Hospitals” rankings.

2026 US News & World Report National Rankings for Mayo Clinic Florida
Specialty	Rank (In the U.S.)	Rank (In Florida)
Cancer	#37	#4
Cardiology	#19	#1
Diabetes & Endocrinology	#23	
Gastroenterology & GI Surgery	#11	
Geriatrics	#20	
Neurology & Neurosurgery	#18	
Orthopedics	#15	#1
Pulmonology & Lung Surgery	#24	
Urology	#19	

Newsweek World’s Best Specialized Hospitals 2027
Specialty	Rank (globally)	Year	Ref
Overall	#11 (United States)	2026	
Overall	#47 (globally)	2026	
Cardiac Surgery	#29 (globally)	2027	
Cardiology	#31 (globally)	2027	
Endocrinology	#12 (globally)	2027	
Gastroenterology	#42 (globally)	2027	
Nephrology	#29 (globally)	2027	
Neurology	#16 (globally)	2027	
Neurosurgery	#44 (globally)	2027	
Neurosurgery	#44 (globally)	2027	
Obstetrics-gynecology	#47 (globally)	2027	
Oncology	#28 (globally)	2027	
Pulmonology	#41 (globally)	2027	
Urology	#14 (globally)	2027	

== Facilities ==
The three main buildings at the site are the Davis Building, the Mayo Building (including the hospital) and the Cannaday Building. Laboratory research is also conducted on Mayo's campus. Mayo's research is focused on cancer, neurological and neuro-degenerative diseases. The goal of this research is to bring the advances from laboratory research to patient care as quickly as possible.

The campus also houses a Courtyard by Marriott. In addition, in September 2021 Mayo Clinic announced that a $70 million, 252-room Hilton Hotel will open on the Mayo Clinic Florida campus in 2025.

=== Expansion ===
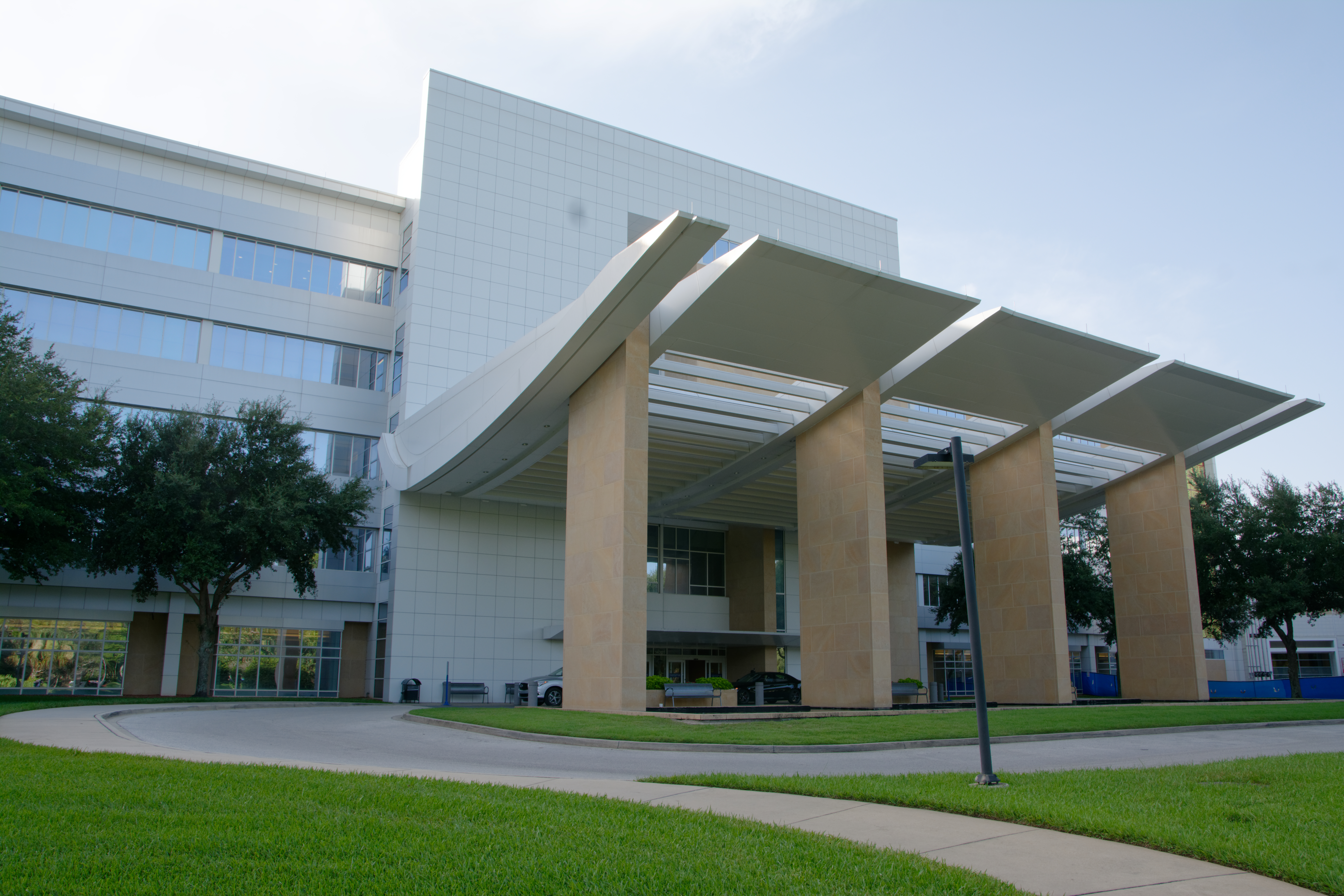

With a $70.5 million expansion plan, more than 300,000 square feet (28,000 m^{2}) of space will be built over the course of five years beginning in 2017. This will allow for the growth of hundreds of staff positions and 100 physicians. The expansion will provide: space for cardiovascular, radiology and cardio-thoracic surgery program areas, expansion of the spine center and pain rehabilitation programs, additional surgical rooms, space and equipment to establish a molecular imaging center for radiology and laboratory expansion. Four new floors will be added to the Mayo-South Building and 40,000 square feet (3,700 m^{2}) in the Davis Building will be remodeled. Three additional buildings will be constructed; one will provide integrated services of complex cancers and have space for neurologic and neurosurgical care, one will be a lung restoration center to allow for more transplantations, and the third will include a positron emission tomography (PET) radiochemistry facility with an on-site cyclotron.

In 2019 Mayo announced it will spend $233 million to create a comprehensive cancer center in its Jacksonville campus. When it opens in 2025 it will be one of only two designated Comprehensive Cancer Centers in Florida. The center will also offer a particle therapy facility, one of three such facilities in Jacksonville (the others being proton therapy installations at UF Health and the Ackerman Cancer Center), and of which there are only a few dozen in the United States. Mayo's facility will be the first to employ carbon ion radiotherapy in North America.

In February 2022 Mayo announced a $432 million project to add five floors to the existing inpatient tower, plus additional facilities at the site. When completed in 2026, the expansion will add 124 beds to Mayo Clinic Hospital, bringing the total number of beds to 428.

== See also ==
- Mayo Clinic Arizona
- Mayo Clinic Hospital (Rochester), Saint Marys Campus, Methodist Campus
- Mayo Clinic College of Medicine and Science
- Mayo Clinic Cancer Center
