= List of cancer hospitals in Pakistan =

This is a list of cancer hospitals in Pakistan by respective province and territory.

== Azad Jammu & Kashmir ==
Kashmir Institute of Nuclear Medicine & Radiotherapy.

== Balochistan ==
- Centre For Nuclear Medicine & Radiotherapy (CENAR), Quetta

== Gilgit-Baltistan ==
- Gilgit Institute of Nuclear Medicine Oncology, Gilgit

== Islamabad Capital Territory ==
- Nuclear Medicine, Oncology & Radiotherapy Institute (NORI) (Pakistan Institute of Medical Sciences),
- Shifa International Hospital Islamabad, Islamabad

== Khyber Pakhtunkhwa ==
- Northwest General Hospital & Research Centre, Peshawar
- Shaukat Khanum Memorial Cancer Hospital & Research Centre, Peshawar
- Bannu Institute of Nuclear Medicine Oncology and Radiotherapy (BINOR), Bannu
- Institute of Nuclear Medicine, Oncology & Radiotherapy (INOR), Abbottabad
- Institute of Radiotherapy & Nuclear Medicine (IRNUM), Peshawar
- Swat Institute of Nuclear Medicine Oncology & Radiotherapy (SINOR), Saidu Sharif

== Punjab ==
- Pink Ribbon Breast Cancer Hospital, Pink Ribbon Hospital
- Cancer Care Hospital & Research Centre, Cancer care hospital
- Shaukat Khanum Memorial Cancer Hospital & Research Centre, Lahore
- Wazir Habib Cancer Center (WHCC),/ Cancer Center Lahore
- Bahawalpur Institute of Nuclear Medicine & Oncology (BINO), Bahawalpur
- Centre for Nuclear Medicine (CENUM), Lahore
- Gujranwala Institute of Nuclear Medicine (GINUM), Gujranwala
- Institute of Nuclear Medicine and Oncology (INMOL), Lahore
- Multan Institute of Nuclear Medicine and Radiotherapy (MINAR), Multan
- Punjab Institute of Nuclear Medicine and Radiotherapy (PINUM), Faisalabad
- Department of Surgery and Surgical Oncology, Shaikh Zayed Medical Complex, Lahore (Cancer Surgery Service only)
- Combined Military Hospital Rawalpindi

== Sindh ==
- Neurospinal and Cancer Care Institute (NCCI), Karachi
- Ziauddin Cancer Hospital Ziauddin University Karachi
- Baitul Sukoon Cancer Hospital Karachi
- The Cancer Foundation Hospital Karachi
- The Aga Khan University Hospital, Karachi
- Shaukat Khanum Memorial Cancer Hospital & Research Centre, Karachi
- Atomic Energy Medical Centre (AEMC), Karachi
- Karachi Institute of Radiotherapy and Nuclear Medicine (KIRAN), Karachi
- Larkana Institute of Radiotherapy and Nuclear Medicine (LINAR), Larkana
- Nuclear Institute of Medicine & Radiotherapy (NIMRA), Jamshoro
- Nuclear Medicine Oncology & Radiotherapy Institute Nawabshah (NORIN), Nawabshah
- Cyberknife, Jinnah Hospital Karachi
- Sindh Institute of Urology and Transplantation, Karachi
- Pak Onco Care, Karachi
- Indus Children Cancer Hospital

== See also ==
- List of hospitals in Pakistan
