= Christine Lovly =

American oncologist

Christine M. Lovly
- Education: Johns Hopkins University (BSc) Washington University in St. Louis (MS, PhD)
- Scientific career
- Workplaces: Vanderbilt University

Christine M. Lovly is an associate professor of medicine at Vanderbilt University. Her research involves the development of novel treatment strategies for ALK positive lung cancer.

== Early life and education ==
Lovly realised that she wanted to help people suffering from cancer at the age of sixteen. She studied chemistry at Johns Hopkins University. She moved to Washington University in St. Louis for her graduate studies, where she joined the Medical Scientist Training Program. She earned an MD–PhD in 2006. Lovly trained in internal medicine and medical oncology at Vanderbilt University and completed her residency in 2008. She was board certified in 2012 by the American Board of Internal Medicine.

== Research and career ==
In 2012 Lovly joined the faculty at Vanderbilt University, where she serves as an Associate Professor and the Co-Leader of the Translational Research and Interventional Oncology Program at the Vanderbilt University Medical Center. Her research focuses on understanding and developing novel therapeutic strategies for molecular subsets of lung cancer. In the United States, lung cancer is responsible for more death than any other form of cancer. Her research involves the development of combination therapies that are able to target cancers with abnormal cellular pathways. Lovly has also identified particular mutations that can contribute to a person becoming resistant to therapy.

Advanced metastatic disease, cancer which has spread from where it started in the lung, has historically been treated using chemotherapy. Some lung cancer patients have molecular alterations that can permit targeted treatments. Some of these include alterations in the protein anaplastic lymphoma kinase (ALK) receptor tyrosine kinase. When this protein is altered, there is potential for pharmaceuticals that block the action of the mutant ALK gene, but almost all patients develop resistance to them.

It is known that non-small-cell lung carcinoma (NSCLC) do not respond as effectively to combination drugs as other forms of lung cancer. Lovly has worked with computer scientists to develop algorithms that can identify the drug interactions that are effective at killing tumors and result in fewer side effects. Lovly has investigated TAK-788 as a targeted therapy for people with NSCLC and BLU-667 for patients with RET rearrangements.

She is involved with the Vanderbilt University online resource My Cancer Genome, which contains information about cancer mutations and the impact they may have on the treatment of patients with cancer. She is supported by the American Society of Clinical Oncology and the Lung Cancer Foundation of America. Lovly was also recognized as one of the 100 Influential Women in Oncology by OncoDaily.

=== Selected publications ===
Her publications include:

- Lovly, Christine (2012-03-10). "ROS1 rearrangements define a unique molecular class of lung cancers". Journal of Clinical Oncology. 30 (8): 863–870. doi:10.1200/JCO.2011.35.6345. PMC 3295572. PMID 22215748.
- Lovly, Christine (2001). "Localization of human Cdc25C is regulated both by nuclear export and 14-3-3 protein binding". Oncogene. 20 (15): 1839–1851. doi:10.1038/sj.onc.1204259. PMID 11313932.
- Lovly, Christine (2012-04-20). "Routine multiplex mutational profiling of melanomas enables enrollment in genotype-driven therapeutic trials". PLOS ONE. 7 (4) e35309. Bibcode:2012PLoSO...735309L. doi:10.1371/journal.pone.0035309. PMC 3335021. PMID 22536370.
