= Sarah Luse =

Neuropathologist (1918–1970)

- Born: December 12, 1918; Emmetsburg, Iowa
- Died: December 28, 1970 (aged 52)
- Education: Rockford College; Case Western Reserve University
- Scientific career
- Workplaces: Washington University in St. Louis; Columbia University; Johns Hopkins University; Mayo Graduate School

Sarah Luse (December 12, 1918 – December 28, 1970) was an American physician who was a professor of anatomy at Columbia University. Her research considered the development of imaging techniques to better understand the nervous system, with a focus on electron microscopy.

== Early life and education ==
Luse was born in Emmetsburg, Iowa. She grew up working on a farm, where she was responsible for looking after animals and operating farm machinery. She attended Rockford College and graduated in 1940. After graduating, she worked as a technician in Mayo Clinic Hospital (Rochester). She was responsible for interpreting electroencephalograms. In 1945, she moved to Case Western Reserve University, where she oversaw electroencephalography. She was awarded the George W. Crile scholarship and made a doctor of medicine in 1949. Luse interned in Johns Hopkins University, and returned to Ohio as a medical resident. She held a residency at the Mayo Graduate School, and, in 1953, was made first assistant in neuropathology.

== Research and career ==
Luse joined Washington University School of Medicine as an American Cancer Society Fellow. She held various positions, including being Professor of Pathology. In 1964 she was made Head of the Department of Anatomy, and was the first women to hold such a position. She moved to Columbia University as Professor of Anatomy in 1967.

Luse's research made use of electron microscopy to better understand the nervous system. She studied tumors in the adrenal cortex, diseases that cause demyelination and the processes which result in the formation of myelin. She showed that multiple sclerosis causes damage on neurons.

In 1959, Luse joined the Armed Forces Institute of Pathology, where she applied electroencephalography to understand the impact of barometric pressures in aviation medicine.

== Selected publications ==
- LUSE SA (September 1, 1956). "Electron microscopic observations of the central nervous system". Journal of Biophysical and Biochemical Cytology. 2 (5): 531–542. ISSN 0095-9901. PMC 2223987. PMID 13376632. Wikidata Q36422869.
- S A LUSE (November 1, 1956). "Formation of myelin in the central nervous system of mice and rats, as studied with the electron microscope". Journal of Biophysical and Biochemical Cytology. 2 (6): 777–784. doi:10.1083/jcb.2.6.777. ISSN 0095-9901. PMC 2224009. PMID 13398444. Wikidata Q30811805.
- L W O'Neal; D M Kipnis; S A Luse; P E Lacy; L Jarett (June 1, 1968). "Secretion of various endocrine substances by ACTH-secreting tumors--gastrin, melanotropin, norepinephrine, serotonin, parathormone, vasopressin, glucagon". Cancer. 21 (6): 1219–1232. doi:10.1002/1097-0142(196806)21:6<1219::aid-cncr2820210625>3.0.co;2-m. ISSN 0008-543X. PMID 4296748. Wikidata Q68576941.

== Personal life ==
In 1970, Luse died unexpectedly of myocarditis in a hotel in San Francisco.
