= Mayo Clinic College of Medicine and Science =

Private university in Rochester, Minnesota, US

- Former names: Mayo Clinic College of Medicine (2003 – 2017); Mayo Foundation (until 2003)
- Type: Private nonprofit university
- Established: 1915
- Parent institution: Mayo Clinic
- Dean: Fredric B. Meyer (Juanita Kious Waugh Executive Dean for Education)
- Administrative staff: 4,590
- Postgraduates: 4,200+
- Location: Rochester, Minnesota, U.S. 44.0213°N 92.4670°W
- Campus: Urban
- Website: college.mayo.edu

The Mayo Clinic College of Medicine and Science (MCCMS; formerly known as Mayo Clinic College of Medicine) is a private graduate-only research university based in Rochester, Minnesota, United States. It trains physicians, scientists, and allied health professionals. The college is part of the Mayo Clinic academic medical center and is accredited by the Higher Learning Commission (HLC). The college consists of five schools that offer Doctor of Medicine, Doctor of Philosophy, and other degrees, as well as medical residencies, fellowships, and continuing medical education.

== Organization ==
Mayo Clinic College of Medicine and Science is divided into five schools.

School	Abbreviation	Established
School of Graduate Medical Education	MCSGME	1915
School of Medicine	MCASOM	1972
School of Health Sciences	MCSHS	1973
School of Continuous Professional Development	MCSCPD	1977
Graduate School of Biomedical Sciences	MCGSBS	1989

=== Graduate Medical Education ===
The Mayo Clinic School of Graduate Medical Education (MCSGME), established in 1915, offers more than 300 residences and fellowships in all medical and surgical specialties with 1,791 active trainees.

=== Medicine ===
The Mayo Clinic Alix School of Medicine (MCASOM), established in 1972, offers M.D., M.D.-Ph.D. (jointly with MCGSBS), and M.D.-O.M.S. (jointly with MCSGME) degrees.

=== Health Sciences ===
The Mayo Clinic School of Health Sciences (MCSHS), established in 1973, offers over 110 programs, internships, and rotations for 50 allied health professions.

=== Continuous Professional Development ===
The Mayo Clinic School of Continuous Professional Development (MCSCPD), established in 1977, offers over 500 courses for continuing medical education. More than 84,000 medical professionals enrolled and participated in these courses during 2019.

=== Biomedical Sciences ===
The Mayo Clinic Graduate School of Biomedical Sciences (MCGSBS), established in 1989, offers Master's, Ph.D., and M.D.-Ph.D. (jointly with MCASOM) degrees in biomedical sciences.

== Interschool programs ==
The collegiate structure of the Mayo Clinic College of Medicine and Science allows students to combine advanced training within the Mayo Clinic.

=== Medical Scientist Training Program (M.D.-Ph.D.) ===
The Mayo Clinic M.D.-Ph.D. Program was established in 1986 and has been continuously funded by an NIH/NIGMS Medical Scientist Training Program (MSTP) T32 grant since 2003. It is a partnership between Mayo Clinic Alix School of Medicine and Mayo Clinic Graduate School of Biomedical Sciences that operates on a 2-4-2 model, where students earn their Ph.D. between medical school Years 2 and 3. MSTP students are able to take or test out of several graduate school classes during medical school Years 1 and 2. They also have the flexibility to complete medical school Year 3 clinical clerkships during their graduate school years if it works with their research schedule. For students who choose to focus exclusively on research during the graduate phase, a robust re-entry curriculum is provided to students as they transition back to medical school Year 3. The Mayo Clinic MSTP fully supports students through a guaranteed internal fellowship for up to four research years, eliminating the need for students to identify a faculty member to provide financial support.

=== Center for Clinical and Translational Science M.D.-M.S. Program ===
The Mayo Clinic Center for Clinical and Translational Science (CCaTS) offers the M.D.-M.S. dual degree through MCASOM and MCGSBS. The CCaTS program is open to medical students at MCASOM and the University of Puerto Rico School of Medicine. Competitive awards are available to cover program fees while also providing a stipend and support for research expenses.

=== Oral and Maxillofacial Surgery Residency (M.D.-O.M.S.) ===
The Mayo Clinic Oral and Maxillofacial Surgery residency (M.D.-O.M.S.) is a 6-year joint offering of MCASOM and Mayo Clinic School of Graduate Medical Education in which dentists earn their M.D. degrees during surgical training.

== History ==
The Mayo Clinic has a long history of medical education and was a pioneer in postgraduate education for physicians.

The first medical educational programs at the Mayo Clinic were developed in 1915 with the assistance of the University of Minnesota. The two institutions held close relationships in the early 20th century. William James Mayo was a Regent of the University of Minnesota and his brother Charles Horace Mayo was a professor of surgery at the University of Minnesota Medical School. In its early years, the Mayo Clinic was operated as a for-profit hospital and could not affiliate with the university.

This led to the creation of the Mayo Foundation for Medical Education and Research (MFMER) in 1915. MFMER was established as a department of the University of Minnesota with a $1.5 million donation to offer graduate programs at the Mayo Clinic in Rochester. During the same time period, the Mayo brothers created the Mayo Properties Association which converted the Mayo Clinic into a non-profit association practice. Mayo Properties Association later became the Mayo Foundation. These steps led to the university and Mayo Clinic to enter into an affiliation and teaching agreement. The curriculum during this period focused on the development of medical specialists during a time when the medical field was becoming further professionalized.

== Location ==
The Mayo Clinic College of Medicine and Science is based in Rochester, Minnesota, with additional campuses in Phoenix and Scottsdale, Arizona, and Jacksonville, Florida. These are named Mayo Clinic Arizona and the Mayo Clinic Florida.

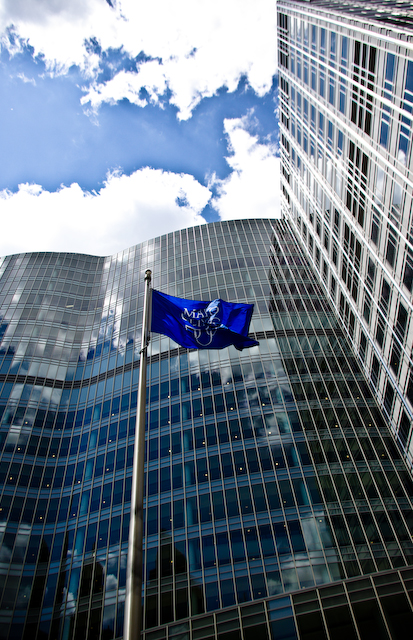
Gonda Building with Mayo Flag

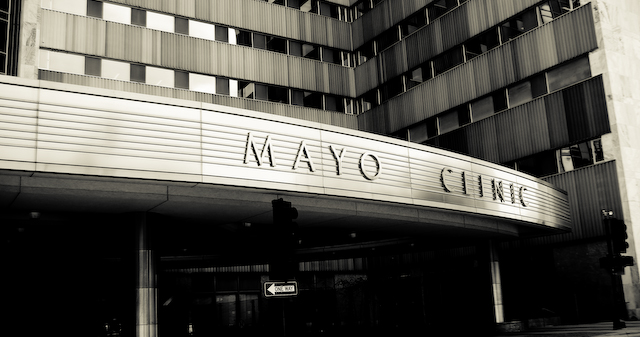
Mayo Clinic

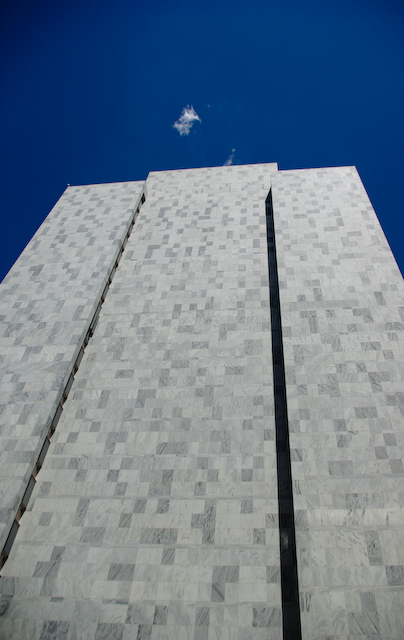
The Mayo Building

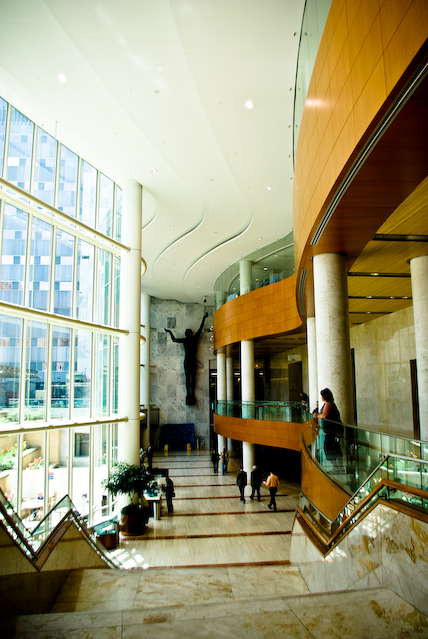
The Grand Staircase in the Gonda Building

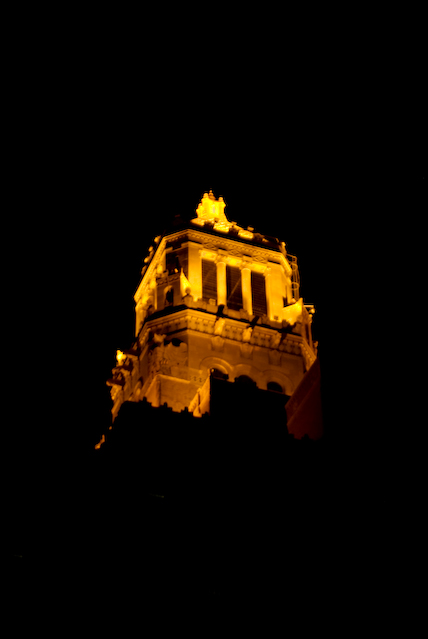
The Plummer Building

== See also ==
- Mayo Clinic Arizona
- Mayo Clinic Hospital (Rochester), Saint Marys Campus, Methodist Campus
- Mayo Clinic Florida
- Mayo Clinic Cancer Center
