= Fuda =

Fuda may be:

- Fuda Station, Keiō Line, Chōfu, Tokyo
- Fuda Cancer Hospital-Guangzhou
- A colloquial name for Fu Jen Catholic University, New Taipei, Taiwan

== People with the surname ==
- Ryoko Fuda (不田 涼子; born 1986), Japanese retired tennis player

== See also ==
- Ofuda, talisman issued by Shinto shrine
