= MCCC =

MCCC may refer to:

== Education ==
- Mercer County Community College, New Jersey, United States
- Monroe County Community College, Michigan, United States
- Montgomery County Community College, Pennsylvania, United States
- Mount Carmel Catholic College, Varroville, New South Wales, Australia
- MidCoast Christian College, Taree, New South Wales, Australia

== Biology and medicine ==
- Marie Curie Cancer Care, a British charity
- Mayo Clinic Cancer Center, a research institute in the United States
- MCCC1 and MCCC2, genes that encode methylcrotonyl-CoA carboxylase

== Sports ==
- Midwest Christian College Conference, an athletics body in the United States
- Mid-Central College Conference, former name of the Crossroads League, an athletics body of Christian colleges in the Midwestern United States
- Minor Counties Cricket Championship, in England
- Middlesex County Cricket Club, a cricket venue in England
- Monte Carlo Country Club, a tennis venue in the south of France
- Minnesota College Athletic Conference, formerly known as the Minnesota Community College Conference

== Other ==
- 1300 in Roman numerals
- Maneuver Captains Career Course, U.S. Army
- Missile combat crew commander, U.S. Air Force
- Marin County Civic Center, government complex in San Rafael, California designed by Frank Lloyd Wright
- Media, Culture & Creative Cities, The University of Hong Kong Master of Social Sciences
