= Nuclear medicine in Pakistan =

The history of pursuing nuclear medicine goes back to 1956, when the Pakistan Atomic Energy Commission (PAEC) was established under the executive order of the Prime Minister of Pakistan, Huseyn Shaheed Suhrawardy. The PAEC, the scientific body that is responsible for establishing the nuclear power plants in the country, has sat up a Nuclear Medicines laboratory. The PAEC also set up the nuclear medicines lab and facilities throughout the country to fight against Cancer. Pakistan Atomic Energy Commission had provided the facilities of diagnosis and treatment of cancer and allied diseases to the patients from all over the country employing nuclear techniques at its medical centers. PAEC also sponsored the research program in the field of radiochemistry and biochemistry. PAEC also sat up the research institutes all over the country, some of them are below:

== List ==
- Atomic Energy Medical Centre (AEMC)
- Karachi Institute of Radiotherapy and Nuclear Medicine (KIRAN)
- Multan Institute of Nuclear Medicine and Radiotherapy (MINAR)
- Institute of Nuclear Medicine & Oncology (INMOL)
- Punjab Institute of Nuclear Medicines (PINUM)
- Institute of Radiotherapy and Nuclear Medicine (IRNUM)
- Centre for Nuclear Medicine (CENUM)
- Nuclear Institute of Medicine & Radiotherapy (NIMRA)
- Centre for Nuclear Medicine & Radiotherapy (CENAR)
- Bahawalpur Institute for Nuclear Oncology (BINO)
- Larkana Institute of Nuclear Medicine and Radiotherapy (LINAR)
- Nuclear Medicine Oncology & Radiotherapy Institute Nawabshah (NORIN)
- Nuclear Medicine Oncology & Radiotherapy Institute (NORI)
- Institute of Nuclear Medicine, Oncology and Radiotherapy (INOR)
