= Masonic Cancer Center =

The Masonic Cancer Center, University of Minnesota (MCC) is a National Cancer Institute designated comprehensive cancer center. It is part of the University of Minnesota in Minneapolis.

== History ==
The Masonic Cancer Center, University of Minnesota was established in 1991. and five years later, the building was completed.

The center was designated as a comprehensive cancer center by the National Cancer Institute in 1998; it is one of two such centers in Minnesota.

Following a gift of $65 million in April 2008 by Minnesota Masonic Charities (the largest gift ever received by the University of Minnesota), the cancer center adopted its current name.

In June 2013, the University of Minnesota dedicated a new $200 million building, the Cancer and Cardiovascular Research Building, which is part of the university's "Biomedical Discovery District," a cluster of research-oriented buildings on the East Bank behind TCF Stadium.

== Organization and research ==
The center is part of the University of Minnesota's Academic Health Center, which consists of the University of Minnesota Medical School and eight of colleges and schools of the university.

About 250 researchers work at the MCC.

The Masonic Cancer Center lists its "major research programs" as the following: carcinogenesis and chemoprevention; cellular mechanisms; genetic mechanisms; immunology; screening, prevention, etiology, and cancer survivorship (SPECS); and transplant biology and therapy.
