= Mayo Clinic Graduate School of Biomedical Sciences =

Medical graduate training school

- Former names: Mayo Graduate School (until 2017)
- Type: Private nonprofit graduate school
- Established: 1989
- Parent institution: Mayo Clinic College of Medicine and Science
- Dean: Stephen Ekker, Ph.D.
- Academic staff: 341
- Doctoral students: 202
- Location: Rochester, Minnesota, USA; 44.0213°N 92.4670°W
- Campus: Urban
- Website: college.mayo.edu/academics/biomedical-research-training/

The Mayo Clinic Graduate School of Biomedical Sciences (MCGSBS; formerly known as Mayo Graduate School) is one of the schools of higher education within the Mayo Clinic College of Medicine and Science. It offers graduate training in the biomedical sciences with programs for Ph.D., M.D.-Ph.D., and master's degree-seeking students. In addition, Mayo Clinic Graduate School of Biomedical Sciences offers summer undergraduate research fellowships and post-baccalaureate research opportunities.

== Location ==
Mayo Graduate School has locations in the three Mayo Clinic campuses: Rochester, MN, Jacksonville, FL, and Scottsdale, AZ. The majority of students pursue their degrees in Rochester; however, research areas such as neuroscience and cancer biology include faculty at the other sites. The Rochester campus has its school office located in the Guggenheim building and a student center in the Mitchell building.

== Rankings ==
As of 2018, U.S. News & World Report ranks the Mayo Clinic Graduate School of Biomedical Sciences #27 (tie) on their "Best Grad Schools: Biological Sciences" list.

== Academics ==
=== Ph.D. program ===
Core courses for all Ph.D. students cover basic mechanisms and fundamental concepts in biological sciences. More specialized education is provided in advanced, track-specific courses. During the first year, students complete at least three 8-week laboratory rotations in laboratories of their choice. Students then select the labs in which they will pursue their degrees. In order to complete the degree, students must pass written and oral qualifying exams, have at least one first author publication accepted, and write a thesis on their work. The average time length for a Mayo graduate student to get a PhD degree is 5.25 years.

All Ph.D. students are guaranteed an internal fellowship for up to five years. The fellowship covers full tuition, benefits and a competitive stipend. Students are not required serve as a teaching assistant but can if they choose.

==== Tracks ====
Over 340 faculty members mentor students in eight tracks:

- Biochemistry and Molecular Biology (BMB)
- Biomedical Engineering and Physiology (BMEP)
- Clinical and Translational Science (CTS)
- Immunology (IMM)
- Molecular Pharmacology and Experimental Therapeutics (MPET)
- Neuroscience (NSCI)
- Regenerative Sciences (REGS)
- Virology and Gene Therapy (VGT)

Additionally, a Regenerative Sciences Training Program (RSTP) was started in 2017 in collaboration with the Mayo Clinic Center for Regenerative Medicine. The RSTP is open to students in any of the Ph.D. tracks as a subspecialization in order to foster application of these fields to regenerative medicine. The RSTP evolved into the REGS track in 2020.

=== M.D.-Ph.D. program ===
MCGSBS cooperates with the Mayo Clinic Alix School of Medicine (MCASOM) to offer the MD-PhD degree, which is fully funded by an NIH/NIGMS Medical Scientist Training Program T32 grant.

=== Master's program ===
MCGSBS also provides master's degree of biomedical research education. It typically takes 2–3 years. Students or Mayo employees can choose master education from seven tracks described above. Students usually take related courses and finish a scientific project to obtain the degree.

=== Other programs ===
==== Career development internships ====
Mayo Clinic Graduate School of Biomedical Sciences is committed to the principle that society benefits from PhD-trained biomedical scientists leading in a broad range of careers. Many of these careers are different from the careers of graduate school mentors. Therefore, Mayo Clinic Graduate School of Biomedical Sciences offers to upper level PhD and MD/PhD students funded 100-hour Career Development Internships (CDI) allowing networking in a variety of professional settings where biomedical PhD training is highly valued. Internship opportunities include liberal arts education, pharma, clinical lab management, technology transfer, science writing, and public policy.

==== Diversity programming ====
Mayo Clinic Graduate School of Biomedical Sciences is a national center of excellence for the biomedical research training of students from backgrounds underrepresented in science. This training is supported by three long-running NIH diversity training grants.

==== Summer Undergraduate Research Fellowship (SURF) ====
Mayo Clinic Graduate School of Biomedical Sciences sponsors a highly-competitive Summer Undergraduate Research Fellowship program at its three national campuses for PhD- and MD/PhD-bound rising juniors and seniors.

== Photos ==
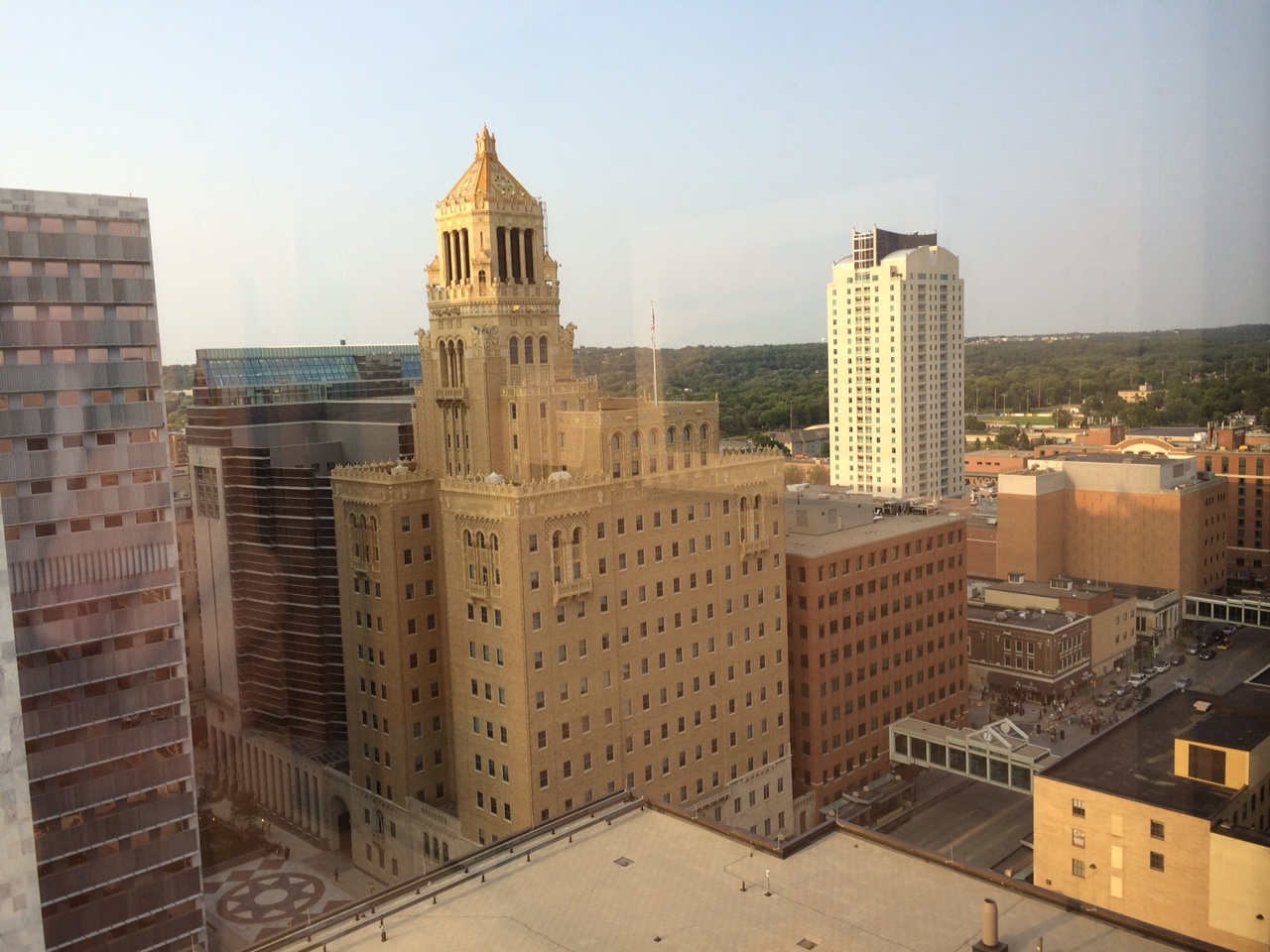
Mayo Rochester Plummer Building

Mayo Clinic Rochester Night

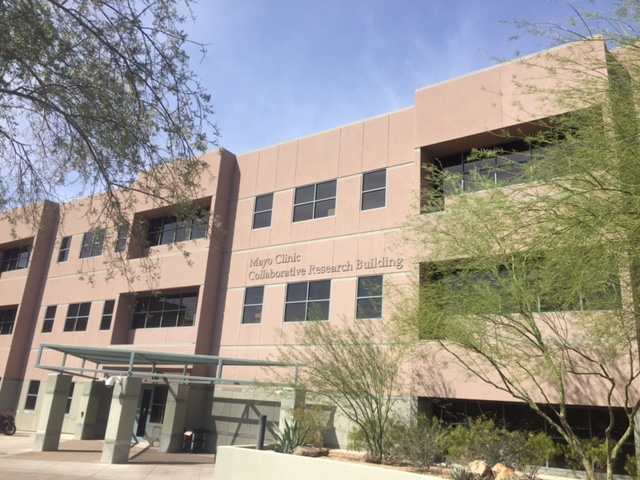
Mayo Clinic Arizona- Mayo Clinic Collaborative Research Building (MCCRB)

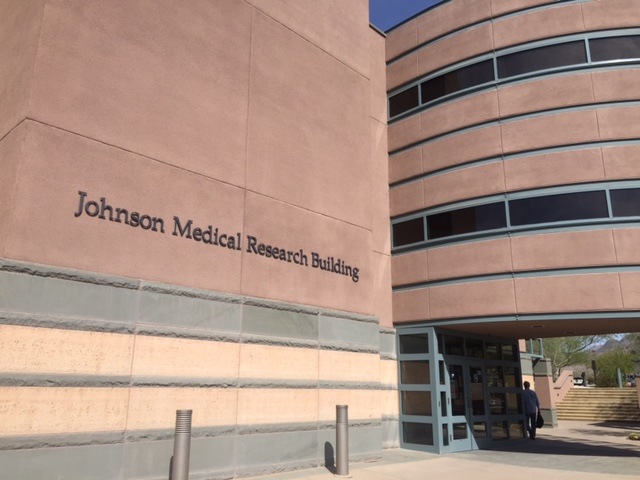
Mayo Clinic Arizona- Johnson Medical Research Building

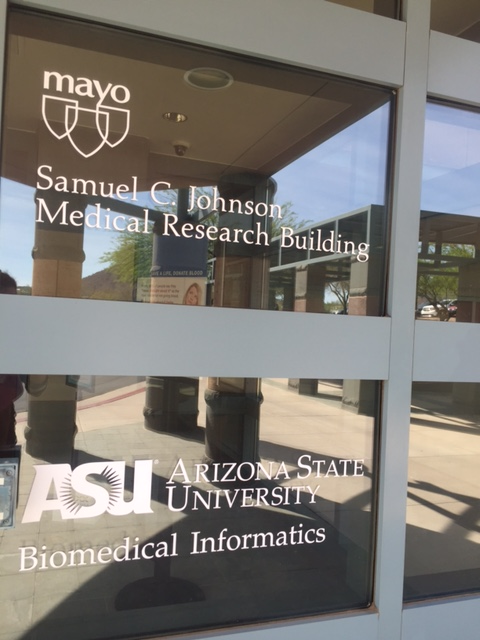
Mayo Clinic Arizona- Johnson Research Building and ASU's Biomedical Informatics (BMI)

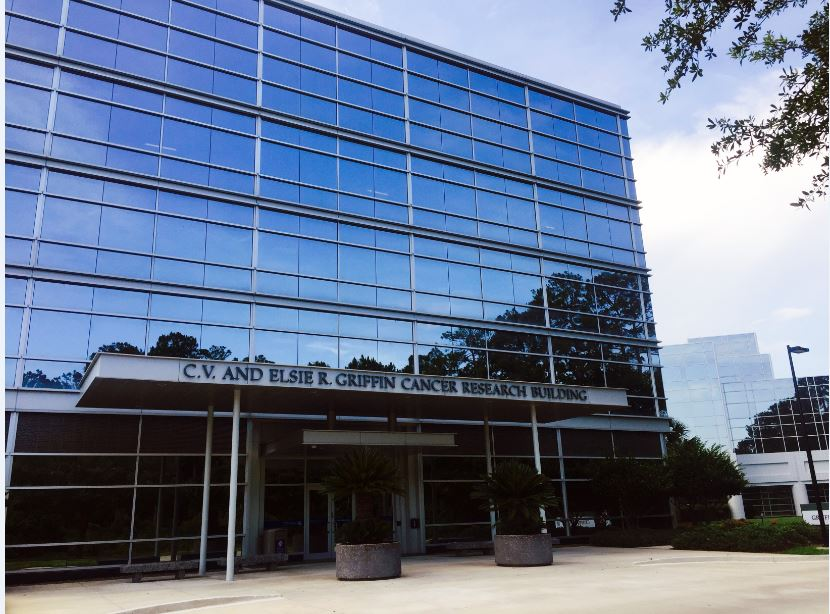
Mayo Clinic Florida Griffin

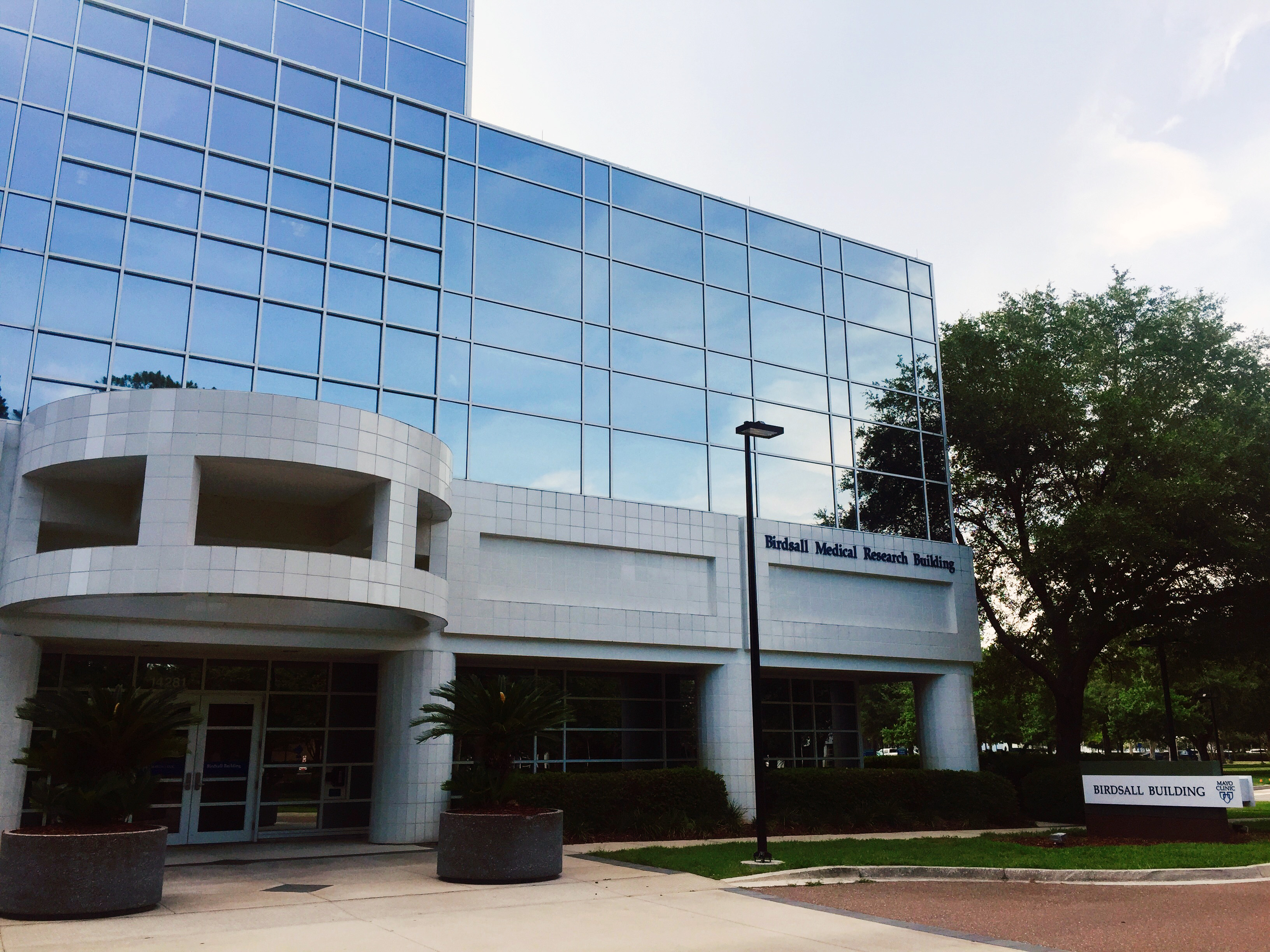
Mayo Clinic Florida Birdsall
