= NCI-designated Cancer Center =

Cancer research institutions in the US

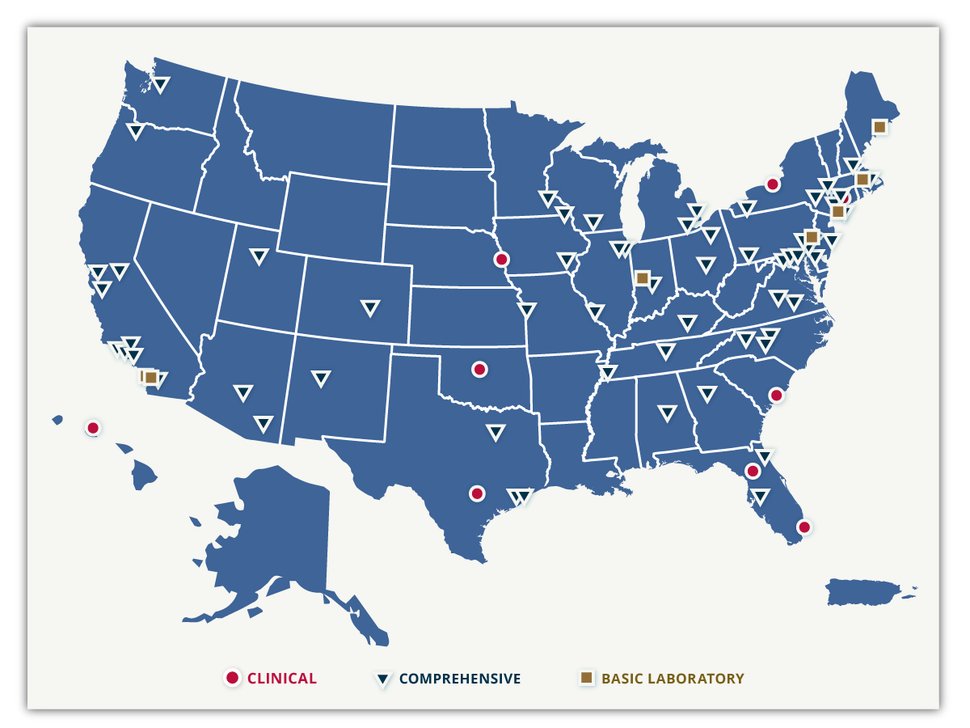
A map of National Cancer Institute Cancer Centers.

NCI-designated Cancer Centers are a group of 74 cancer research institutions in the United States supported by the National Cancer Institute.

Three designations are recognized: Comprehensive Cancer Centers, Clinical Cancer Centers and Basic Laboratory Cancer Centers. As of May 20, 2026, there are 8 Clinical Cancer Centers, 58 Comprehensive Cancer Centers and 8 Basic Laboratory Cancer Centers. Most are associated with a university. Receiving the NCI-designation places cancer centers among the top 4% of the approximately 1,500 cancer centers in the United States.

In 2021, more than 411,000 new patients were enrolled in a clinical trial at an NCI-designated Cancer Center.

== Program ==
=== Designation process ===
The NIH funds cancer centers through a P30 Cancer Center Support Grant (CCSG) mechanism. To be eligible to apply, a cancer center must receive at least $10 million in cancer research funding annually. Preparation for these grant applications can be extensive. The most recent grant application prepared by MD Anderson Cancer Center took 24 months to prepare and ran to 2,963 pages. Cancer centers must renew their status with the NIH every 5 years.

The NCI considers the certain characteristics essential to a cancer center, and requires that applications address the institutions' resources in the areas of: Physical Space, Organizational Capabilities, Transdisciplinary Collaboration and Coordination, Cancer Focus, Institutional Commitment, Center Director.

Independent or freestanding cancer centers are entities unto themselves and are not considered to be part of a larger institution or university. The center’s administration controls all space, appointments and budgets. These institutions may have university affiliations, but they remain administratively and financially distinct.

The NCI also supports Consortium Centers, wherein scientists and clinicians from multiple institutions enter into formal agreements to expand cancer research programs. Importantly, Consortium Partners are not themselves considered NCI-designated. The NCI has strict guidelines on how Consortium Partners can refer to their relationship with their parent Consortium Center.

=== Designations ===
==== Comprehensive Cancer Center ====
The standards for Comprehensive Cancer Centers are the most restrictive. These facilities must demonstrate expertise in each of three areas: laboratory, clinical and behavioral and population-based research. Comprehensive Cancer Centers are expected to initiate and conduct early phase, innovative clinical trials and to participate in the NCI's cooperative groups by providing leadership and recruiting patients for trials. Comprehensive Cancer Centers must also conduct activities in outreach and education, and provide information on advances in healthcare for both healthcare professionals and the public. Comprehensive cancer centers may apply for up to $1.5 million per year from the Department of Health and Human Services.

These grants fund shared resources to further the goals of the National Cancer Institute. Some of these include the administration of cancer research programs, training activities, core facilities with technology shared by investigators and clinical trial management services.

==== Clinical Cancer Center ====
Clinical Cancer Centers generally conduct a combination of basic, population sciences and clinical research, and are encouraged to stimulate collaborative research involving more than one field of study. Clinical cancer centers may apply for up to $1.4 million per year.

==== Basic Laboratory Cancer Centers ====
Basic Laboratory Cancer Centers conduct only laboratory research and do not provide patient treatment. Basic Laboratory Cancer Centers are more often affiliated with research institutes rather than universities. They are eligible to apply for up to $1.2 million per year.

== List of centers ==
List of NCI-Designated Cancer Centers
| Cancer Center | State | City | Designation | Institution | Ref |
|---|---|---|---|---|---|
| O'Neal Comprehensive Cancer Center | Alabama | Birmingham | Comprehensive Cancer Center | University of Alabama at Birmingham | |
| Mayo Clinic Comprehensive Cancer Center (Note: Mayo Clinic Cancer Center has facilities in Arizona, Florida and Minnesota, but is counted as a single institution. It is headquartered in Rochester, Minnesota.) | Arizona | Phoenix | Comprehensive Cancer Center | Independent | |
| University of Arizona Cancer Center | Arizona | Tucson | Comprehensive Cancer Center | University of Arizona | |
| Chao Family Comprehensive Cancer Center | California | Orange | Comprehensive Cancer Center | University of California, Irvine | |
| City of Hope Comprehensive Cancer Center | California | Duarte | Comprehensive Cancer Center | Independent | |
| Helen Diller Family Comprehensive Cancer Center | California | San Francisco | Comprehensive Cancer Center | University of California, San Francisco | |
| Jonsson Comprehensive Cancer Center | California | Los Angeles | Comprehensive Cancer Center | University of California, Los Angeles | |
| Moores Cancer Center | California | La Jolla | Comprehensive Cancer Center | University of California, San Diego | |
| Salk Institute Cancer Center | California | La Jolla | Basic Laboratory Cancer Center | Independent | |
| Sanford Burnham Prebys Medical Discovery Institute | California | La Jolla | Basic Laboratory Cancer Center | Independent | |
| Stanford Cancer Institute | California | Stanford | Comprehensive Cancer Center | Stanford University | |
| UC Davis Comprehensive Cancer Center | California | Sacramento | Comprehensive Cancer Center | University of California, Davis | |
| USC Norris Comprehensive Cancer Center | California | Los Angeles | Comprehensive Cancer Center | University of Southern California | |
| University of Colorado Cancer Center | Colorado | Aurora | Comprehensive Cancer Center | University of Colorado | |
| Yale Cancer Center | Connecticut | New Haven | Comprehensive Cancer Center | Yale University School of Medicine | |
| Georgetown Lombardi Comprehensive Cancer Center | District of Columbia (Note: The District of Columbia is not a state, but rather a federal district.) | Washington | Comprehensive Cancer Center | Georgetown University | |
| Mayo Clinic Comprehensive Cancer Center | Florida | Jacksonville | Comprehensive Cancer Center | Independent | |
| H. Lee Moffitt Cancer Center & Research Institute | Florida | Tampa | Comprehensive Cancer Center | Independent | |
| Sylvester Comprehensive Cancer Center | Florida | Miami | Clinical Cancer Center | University of Miami Miller School of Medicine | |
| University of Florida Health Cancer Center | Florida | Gainesville | Clinical Cancer Center | University of Florida | |
| Winship Cancer Institute | Georgia | Atlanta | Comprehensive Cancer Center | Emory University | |
| University of Hawaiʻi Cancer Center | Hawaiʻi | Honolulu | Clinical Cancer Center | University of Hawaiʻi at Mānoa | |
| Robert H. Lurie Comprehensive Cancer Center | Illinois | Chicago | Comprehensive Cancer Center | Northwestern University | |
| University of Chicago Medicine Comprehensive Cancer Center | Illinois | Chicago | Comprehensive Cancer Center | University of Chicago | |
| Cancer Center at Illinois | Illinois | Urbana | Basic Laboratory Cancer Center | University of Illinois Urbana-Champaign | |
| Indiana University Melvin and Bren Simon Comprehensive Cancer Center | Indiana | Indianapolis | Comprehensive Cancer Center | Indiana University | |
| Purdue Institute for Cancer Research | Indiana | West Lafayette | Basic Laboratory Cancer Center | Purdue University | |
| Holden Comprehensive Cancer Center | Iowa | Iowa City | Comprehensive Cancer Center | University of Iowa | |
| University of Kansas Cancer Center | Kansas | Kansas City | Comprehensive Cancer Center | University of Kansas | |
| Markey Cancer Center | Kentucky | Lexington | Comprehensive Cancer Center | University of Kentucky | |
| Jackson Laboratory Cancer Center | Maine | Bar Harbor | Basic Laboratory Cancer Center | Independent | |
| Sidney Kimmel Comprehensive Cancer Center (Note: The Sidney Kimmel Comprehensive Cancer Center at Johns Hopkins University and the Sidney Kimmel Cancer Center – Jefferson Health are both named for philanthropist Sidney Kimmel, however they have no institutional relations with each other.) | Maryland | Baltimore | Comprehensive Cancer Center | Johns Hopkins University | |
| University of Maryland Marlene and Stewart Greenebaum Comprehensive Cancer Center | Maryland | Baltimore | Comprehensive Cancer Center | University of Maryland, Baltimore | |
| Dana-Farber/Harvard Cancer Center | Massachusetts | Boston | Comprehensive Cancer Center | Harvard University | |
| David H. Koch Institute for Integrative Cancer Research | Massachusetts | Cambridge | Basic Laboratory Cancer Center | Massachusetts Institute of Technology | |
| Barbara Ann Karmanos Cancer Institute | Michigan | Detroit | Comprehensive Cancer Center | Wayne State University School of Medicine | |
| Rogel Cancer Center | Michigan | Ann Arbor | Comprehensive Cancer Center | University of Michigan | |
| Masonic Cancer Center | Minnesota | Minneapolis | Comprehensive Cancer Center | University of Minnesota | |
| Mayo Clinic Comprehensive Cancer Center | Minnesota | Rochester | Comprehensive Cancer Center | Independent | |
| Alvin J. Siteman Cancer Center | Missouri | St. Louis | Comprehensive Cancer Center | Washington University School of Medicine and Barnes-Jewish Hospital | |
| Fred and Pamela Buffett Cancer Center | Nebraska | Omaha | Clinical Cancer Center | Nebraska Medicine and the University of Nebraska Medical Center | |
| Dartmouth Cancer Center | New Hampshire | Lebanon | Comprehensive Cancer Center | Geisel School of Medicine at Dartmouth College | |
| Rutgers Cancer Institute of New Jersey | New Jersey | New Brunswick | Comprehensive Cancer Center | Rutgers Biomedical and Health Sciences | |
| University of New Mexico Comprehensive Cancer Center | New Mexico | Albuquerque | Comprehensive Cancer Center | University of New Mexico | |
| Cold Spring Harbor Laboratory Cancer Center | New York | Cold Spring Harbor | Basic Laboratory Cancer Center | Independent | |
| Herbert Irving Comprehensive Cancer Center | New York | New York | Comprehensive Cancer Center | Columbia University | |
| Laura and Isaac Perlmutter Cancer Center | New York | New York | Comprehensive Cancer Center | NYU Langone Health | |
| Memorial Sloan-Kettering Cancer Center | New York | New York | Comprehensive Cancer Center | Independent | |
| Montefiore Einstein Cancer Center | New York | The Bronx | Comprehensive Cancer Center | Albert Einstein College of Medicine | |
| Roswell Park Comprehensive Cancer Center | New York | Buffalo | Comprehensive Cancer Center | University at Buffalo | |
| Tisch Cancer Institute | New York | New York | Comprehensive Cancer Center | Icahn School of Medicine at Mount Sinai | |
| Wilmot Cancer Institute | New York | Rochester | Clinical Cancer Center | University of Rochester | |
| Duke Cancer Institute | North Carolina | Durham | Comprehensive Cancer Center | Duke University Medical Center | |
| UNC Lineberger Comprehensive Cancer Center | North Carolina | Chapel Hill | Comprehensive Cancer Center | University of North Carolina at Chapel Hill | |
| Wake Forest Baptist Comprehensive Cancer Center | North Carolina | Winston-Salem | Comprehensive Cancer Center | Wake Forest University | |
| Case Comprehensive Cancer Center | Ohio | Cleveland | Comprehensive Cancer Center | Cleveland Clinic, University Hospitals Cleveland Medical Center, and Case Western Reserve University | |
| Ohio State University Comprehensive Cancer Center – Arthur G. James Cancer Hospital and Richard J. Solove Research Institute | Ohio | Columbus | Comprehensive Cancer Center | Ohio State University | |
| Stephenson Cancer Center | Oklahoma | Oklahoma City | Clinical Cancer Center | The University of Oklahoma | |
| Knight Cancer Institute | Oregon | Portland | Comprehensive Cancer Center | Oregon Health and Science University | |
| Abramson Cancer Center | Pennsylvania | Philadelphia | Comprehensive Cancer Center | University of Pennsylvania | |
| Fox Chase Cancer Center | Pennsylvania | Philadelphia | Comprehensive Cancer Center | Temple University Health System | |
| Sidney Kimmel Cancer Center | Pennsylvania | Philadelphia | Comprehensive Cancer Center | Thomas Jefferson University | |
| UPMC Hillman Cancer Center | Pennsylvania | Pittsburgh | Comprehensive Cancer Center | University of Pittsburgh Medical Center | |
| Wistar Institute Cancer Center | Pennsylvania | Philadelphia | Basic Laboratory Cancer Center | Independent | |
| Hollings Cancer Center | South Carolina | Charleston | Clinical Cancer Center | Medical University of South Carolina | |
| St. Jude Children's Research Hospital | Tennessee | Memphis | Comprehensive Cancer Center | Independent | |
| Vanderbilt-Ingram Cancer Center | Tennessee | Nashville | Comprehensive Cancer Center | Vanderbilt University Medical Center | |
| Dan L Duncan Comprehensive Cancer Center | Texas | Houston | Comprehensive Cancer Center | Baylor College of Medicine | |
| Harold C. Simmons Comprehensive Cancer Center | Texas | Dallas | Comprehensive Cancer Center | University of Texas Southwestern Medical Center | |
| Mays Cancer Center at UT Health San Antonio | Texas | San Antonio | Clinical Cancer Center | University of Texas Health Science Center | |
| University of Texas MD Anderson Cancer Center | Texas | Houston | Comprehensive Cancer Center | University of Texas | |
| Huntsman Cancer Institute | Utah | Salt Lake City | Comprehensive Cancer Center | University of Utah | |
| Massey Comprehensive Cancer Center | Virginia | Richmond | Comprehensive Cancer Center | Virginia Commonwealth University | |
| University of Virginia Cancer Center | Virginia | Charlottesville | Comprehensive Cancer Center | University of Virginia School of Medicine | |
| Fred Hutchinson/University of Washington/Seattle Children's Cancer Consortium | Washington | Seattle | Comprehensive Cancer Center | Fred Hutchinson Cancer Center, the University of Washington and Seattle Children's Hospital | |
| University of Wisconsin Carbone Cancer Center | Wisconsin | Madison | Comprehensive Cancer Center | University of Wisconsin–Madison | |

== See also ==
- List of cancer hospitals
- National Cancer Institute – U.S. health institute
- National Comprehensive Cancer Network – Non-profit organization in the U.S.
- Oncology – Branch of medicine dealing with, or specializing in, cancer
