= Physician-scientist =

Conducts clinical practice and scientific research

A physician-scientist (in North American English) or clinician-scientist (in British English and Australian English) is a physician who divides their professional time between direct clinical practice with patients and scientific research. Physician-scientists traditionally hold both a medical degree and a Doctor of Philosophy, also known as an MD-PhD or DO-PhD. Compared to other clinicians, physician-scientists invest significant time and professional effort in scientific research, with ratios of research to clinical time ranging from 50/50 to 80/20.

Physician-scientists are often employed by academic or research institutions where they drive innovation across a wide range of medical specialties and may also use their extensive training to focus their clinical practices on specialized patient populations, such as those with rare genetic diseases or cancers. Although they are a minority of both practicing physicians and active research scientists, physician-scientists are often cited as playing a critical role in translational medicine and clinical research by adapting biomedical research findings to health care applications. Over time, the term physician scientist has expanded to holders of other clinical degrees—such as nurses, dentists, and veterinarians—who are also included by the United States National Institutes of Health (NIH) in its studies of the physician-scientist workforce (PSW).

== History ==
The concept of the physician-scientist is often attributed to Samuel Meltzer's work in the early 1900s. Concern has often been displayed at declining interest or participation in the field, with James Wyngaarden—who would later go on to become the director of the NIH—describing physician-scientists as an "endangered species" in 1979. Among U.S. biomedical researchers, physician-scientists have declined over time as a share of the total researcher population since the 1970s.

== Education ==
Physician-scientists by definition hold terminal degrees in medicine and/or biomedical science. In the United States and Canada, some universities run specialized dual degree MD-PhD programs, and a small number of D.O.-granting institutions also offer dual degree options as D.O.-Ph.D. In the United States the NIH supports competitive university programs called Medical Scientist Training Programs that aim to train physician-scientists, originally established in 1964 and present at 58 institutions as of 2026.

Similar programs were established in the United Kingdom in the 1980s, although with relatively less funding support. There are 3000-5000 trainees in this early-career pool based on the number of MD/PhD trainees in the country and number of medical trainees intending research intense careers . Although this dual-degree pathway is not necessary to establish a physician-scientist career, most do receive some form of explicit research training in addition to their clinical education.

== Impact ==
Physician-scientists have contributed to biomedical innovation, including through discovering life-saving therapies and developing disease prevention strategies. Physician-scientists only make up 1.5% of the biomedical workforce but, according to the PSW, they account for 37% of Nobel Laureates in Physiology or Medicine from 1990 to 2014, and over the last 30 years of the Lasker Awards, 41% of the Basic Awards and 65% of the Clinical Awards have gone to physician-scientists.

== Career and workforce ==
Most physician-scientists are employed by universities and medical schools, or by research institutions such as the National Institutes of Health. As of 2014, the NIH counted around 9,000 NIH-funded physician-scientists; this count does not include those whose work is funded by sources other than the NIH—typically meaning those who work in industry, such as at pharmaceutical companies or medical device companies.

At many medical schools, physician-scientist faculty are expected to obtain significant fractions of their nominal salary in the form of competitive research grants, which are also requirements for the award of tenure. This "up or out" system has been described as developed for a primarily male workforce with homemaker wives, incompatible with the work-life balance needs of the current workforce. Uncertainty about stable careers in academic medicine and the long initial training phase are often cited as concerns by aspiring entrants to the field. Data from the NIH on physician-scientist grant awardees suggests that women and minorities are often underrepresented in the population, even in fields like veterinary science where the majority of students are women.

The American Physician Scientists Association (APSA) is a professional association dedicated to physician-scientists, founded in 2003. APSA has worked to identify and remove barriers thus improving the retention of physician-scientists in academic research. Transitioning through the early career stages of a resident to fellow to junior faculty is the leakiest part of the physician-scientist pathway. The major reasons for leaving research include the inability to obtain research funding, disparities in salaries between research track physician-scientists and full-time clinicians, and increased financial obligations during this time. Therefore, early career awards are the best target for new funding opportunities.

During the COVID-19 pandemic, there has been an unprecedented delay and drop in research productivity due to halted studies, reduction of research time to prioritize COVID-19 related clinical duties, and diminished funding opportunities by private foundations as a result of revenue loss due to the pandemic. These challenges have weakened the physician-scientist workforce further.

The American Society for Clinical Investigation introduced Young Physician-Scientist Awards in 2013 to support productive early-career researchers.
