= University of New Mexico Cancer Research Building =

Coordinates: 35.096°N 106.628°W

University of New Mexico Comprehensive Cancer Center (UNMCCC)
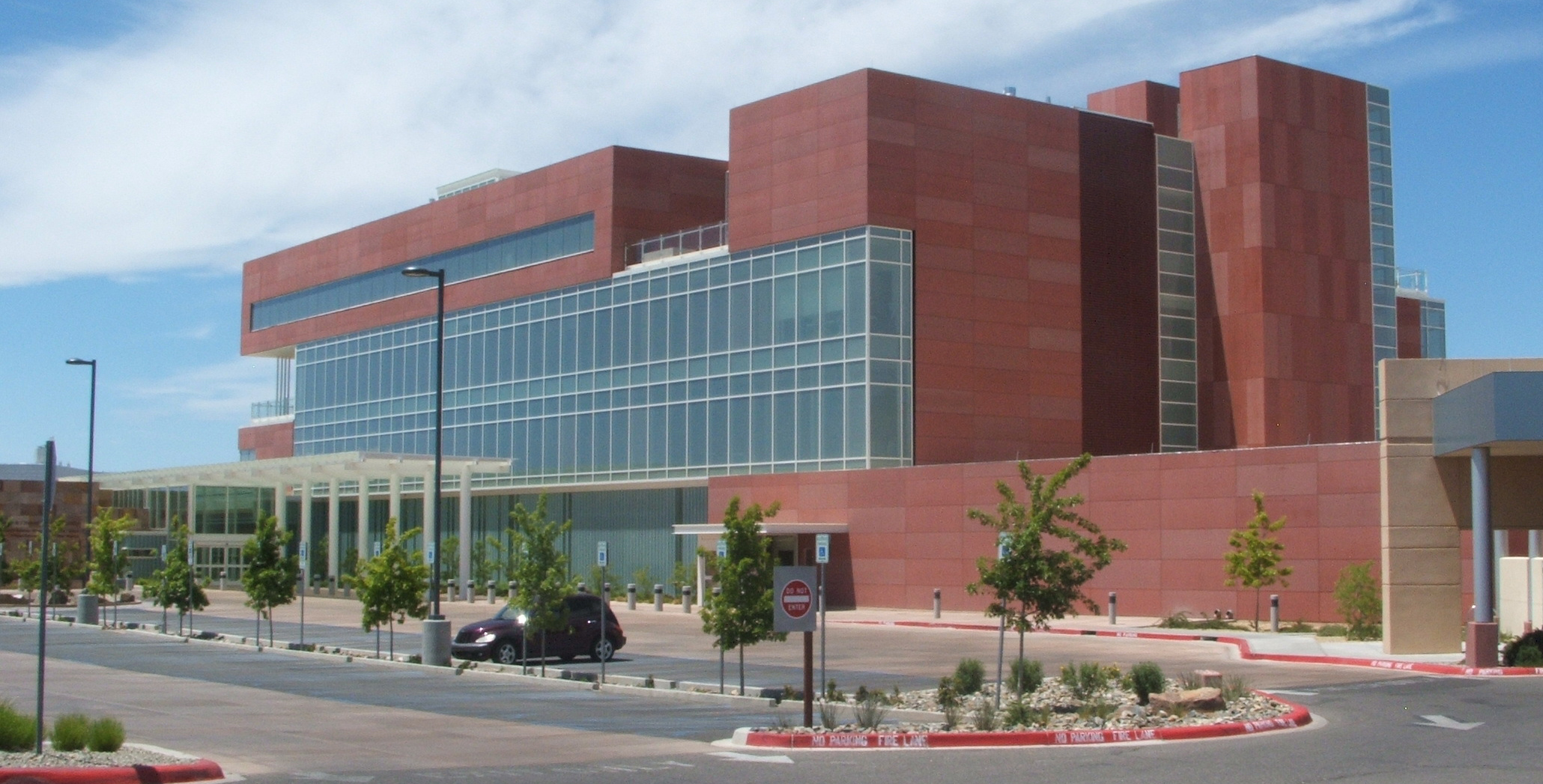
- Interactive map of the University of New Mexico Comprehensive Cancer Center (UNMCCC) area

General information
- Location: UNM Cancer Center, 1201 Camino de Salud NE 1, University of New Mexico, Albuquerque, NM 87102, Albuquerque, New Mexico, United States
- Opened: 2009 (At this location)
- Affiliation: University of New Mexico; University of New Mexico Health Sciences Center; University of New Mexico Hospital

Website
- cancer.unm.edu hsc.unm.edu

The UNM Comprehensive Cancer Center (UNMCCC) is housed in the University of New Mexico Cancer Research Building. The building has five stories and covers 206,000 square feet of clinical space. It is designed as a shelled space for future expansion. The building cost $100 million and was officially opened in 2009.

== NCI designation ==
UNMCCC first received designation as an NCI-designated Cancer Center in 2005. This status was further renewed in 2010, and gained its new designation as an NCI-designated Comprehensive Cancer Center in 2015. Only 51 centers in the nation hold this designation. The UNMCCC is the only cancer center in New Mexico designated by the National Cancer Institute (NCI). To receive this designation, cancer centers must be leaders in scientific research, cancer treatment, and clinical trials, among other requirements laid out by the NCI. The application process to be awarded this designation occurs once every five years, with the most current one being in 2020 for the UNMCCC.
