= Mayo Clinic Cancer Center =

The Mayo Clinic Cancer Center (MCCC) is a National Cancer Institute (NCI)-designated Cancer Center and a division of the Mayo Clinic. The MCCC has three locations in the United States: Phoenix, Arizona, Jacksonville, Florida, and Rochester, Minnesota.

The Mayo Clinic Cancer Center is one of the oldest NCI-designated cancer centers in the United States, having first been designated in 1973. The main location of the Mayo Clinic is in Rochester, MN. Campuses in Arizona and Florida opened later and became part of the Mayo Clinic Cancer Center in 2003.

Mayo receives more than $100 million in research funding annually. It is one of the Lead Academic Participating Sites in the National Cancer Institute (NCI) National Clinical Trials Network.

Mayo has 10 research divisions that faculty members are a part of. Most of these programs are further divided into specific focus areas.

- Cancer immunology and immunotherapy
- Cancer prevention and control
- Cell biology
- Developmental therapeutics
- Gastrointestinal cancer
- Gene and virus therapy
- Genetic epidemiology and risk assessment
- Hematologic malignancies
- Neuro-oncology
- Women's cancer

== See also ==
- Mayo Clinic Arizona
- Mayo Clinic Hospital (Rochester), Saint Marys Campus, Methodist Campus
- Mayo Clinic Florida
- Mayo Clinic College of Medicine and Science
