= DPT-MPH =

Dual degree program

The Doctor of Physical Therapy and Master of Public Health dual degree (DPT-MPH) program offers the opportunity for physical therapy clinicians to pursue a doctoral-level education in combination with an integrated approach to health care.

A DPT-MPH program is aimed at teaching doctors to be strong leaders in preventive health care, as well as effective following a public health crisis. Graduates with a DPT-MPH can pursue careers in curriculum development for programs that treat people with chronic conditions as well as research and teaching of new methods of rehabilitation.
