= Mayo Clinic Hospital (Rochester) =

Research hospital in Minnesota, United States

Mayo Clinic Hospital - Rochester
- Mayo Clinic
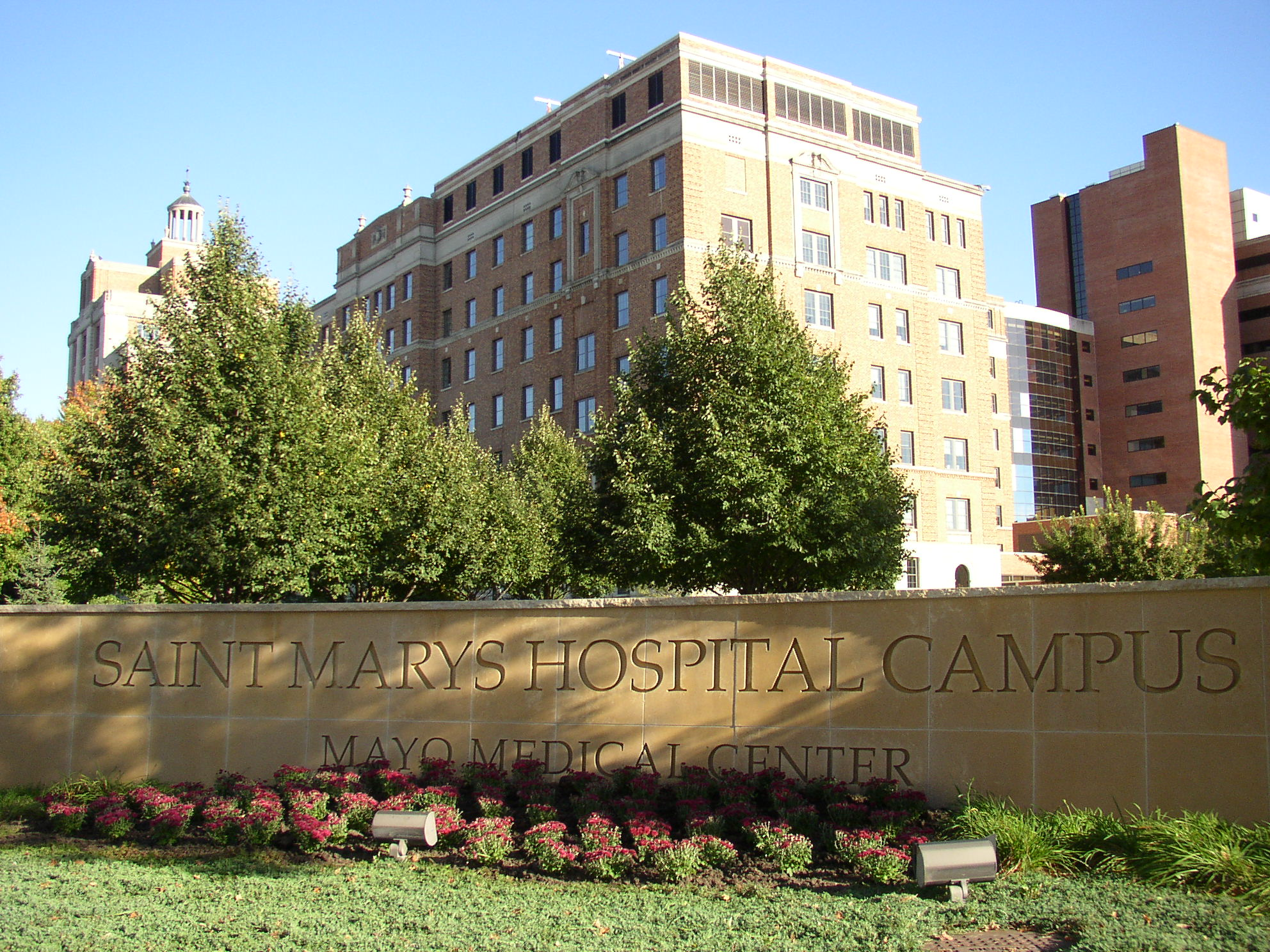
- Mayo Clinic Hospital - Rochester, Saint Marys Campus

Geography
- Location: Rochester, Minnesota, United States
- Coordinates: 44°01′13″N 92°28′54″W (St. Marys Campus) 44°01′27″N 92°27′59″W (Methodist Campus)

Organization
- Type: Teaching
- Affiliated university: Mayo Clinic Alix School of Medicine

Services
- Emergency department: Level I trauma center
- Beds: 2,059

Helipads
- Helipad: FAA LID: 99MN

History
- Opened: 1889

Links
- Website: www.mayoclinic.org/patient-visitor-guide/minnesota
- Lists: Hospitals in Minnesota

The Mayo Clinic Hospital – Rochester is a 2,059-bed teaching hospital located in Rochester, Minnesota. It comprises the Saint Marys Campus with its Mayo Eugenio Litta Children's Hospital, as well as its Methodist Campus, forming an integral part of the Mayo Clinic academic medical center. Mayo Clinic Hospital – Rochester is ranked first on the 2019–20 U.S. News & World Report Best Hospitals Honor Roll. It is also one of the world's largest healthcare-related research centre, with over 12,000 active clinical trials at any given moment in nearly every sector of healthcare.

== History ==
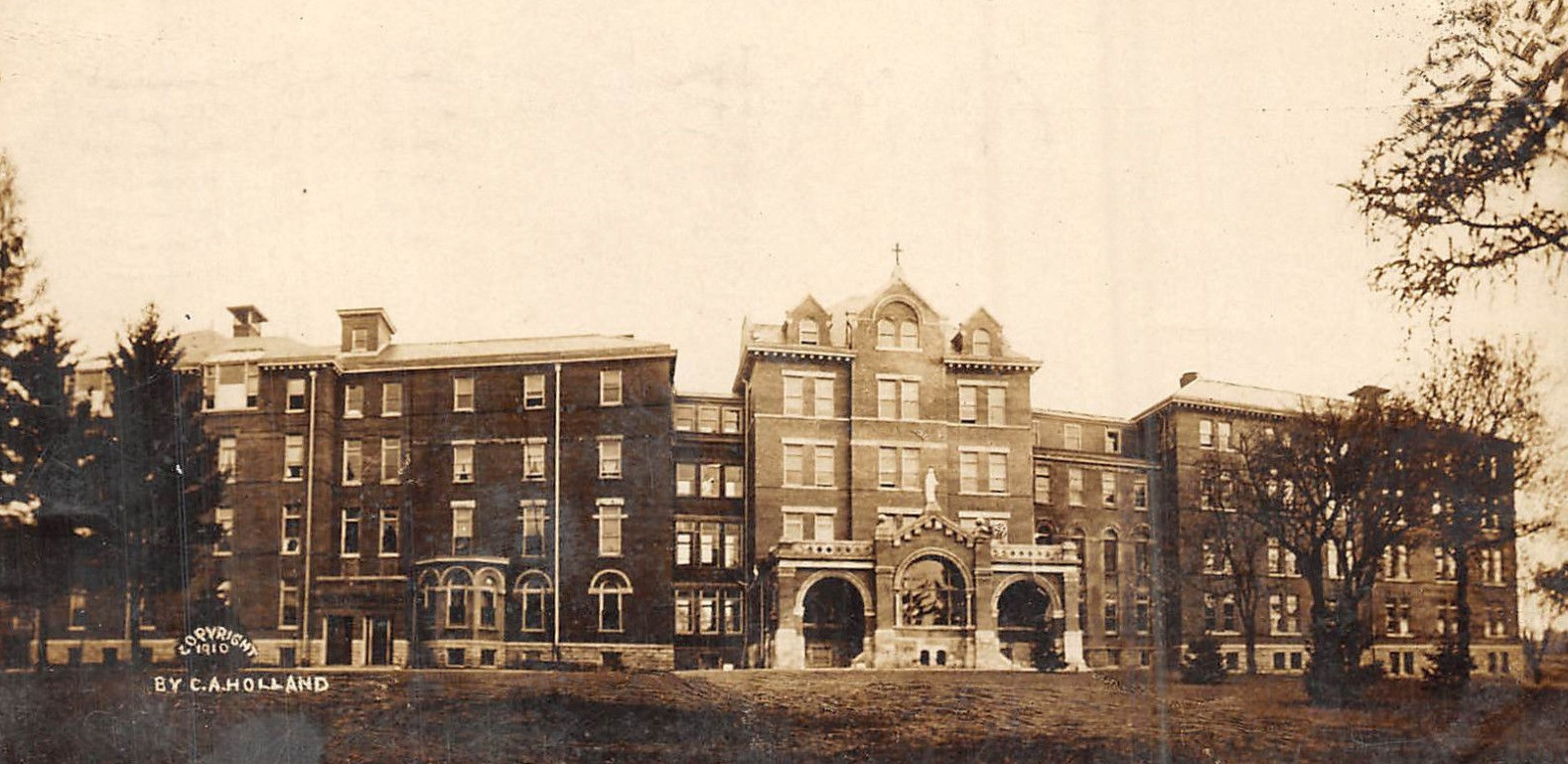
St. Mary's Hospital in 1910

Saint Marys Hospital was founded in 1889 by a local Franciscan religious community, the Sisters of Saint Francis of Rochester, Minnesota, led by Mother Alfred Moes. Five buildings at the Saint Marys Campus are named to honor Saint Marys' foundress and first administrator, Mother Alfred, and four Sisters who previously served as hospital administrators: Sisters Joseph, Domitilla, Mary Brigh and Generose. The Francis Building honors the many Franciscan Sisters who have served since the founding of Saint Marys.

Originally, the name was spelled "Saint Mary's Hospital", as can be seen in stone above the old front entrance, but in recent years the apostrophe is usually omitted.

In January 2014, Saint Marys and Rochester Methodist were consolidated under the name Mayo Clinic Hospital – Rochester.

== Saint Mary's Campus ==
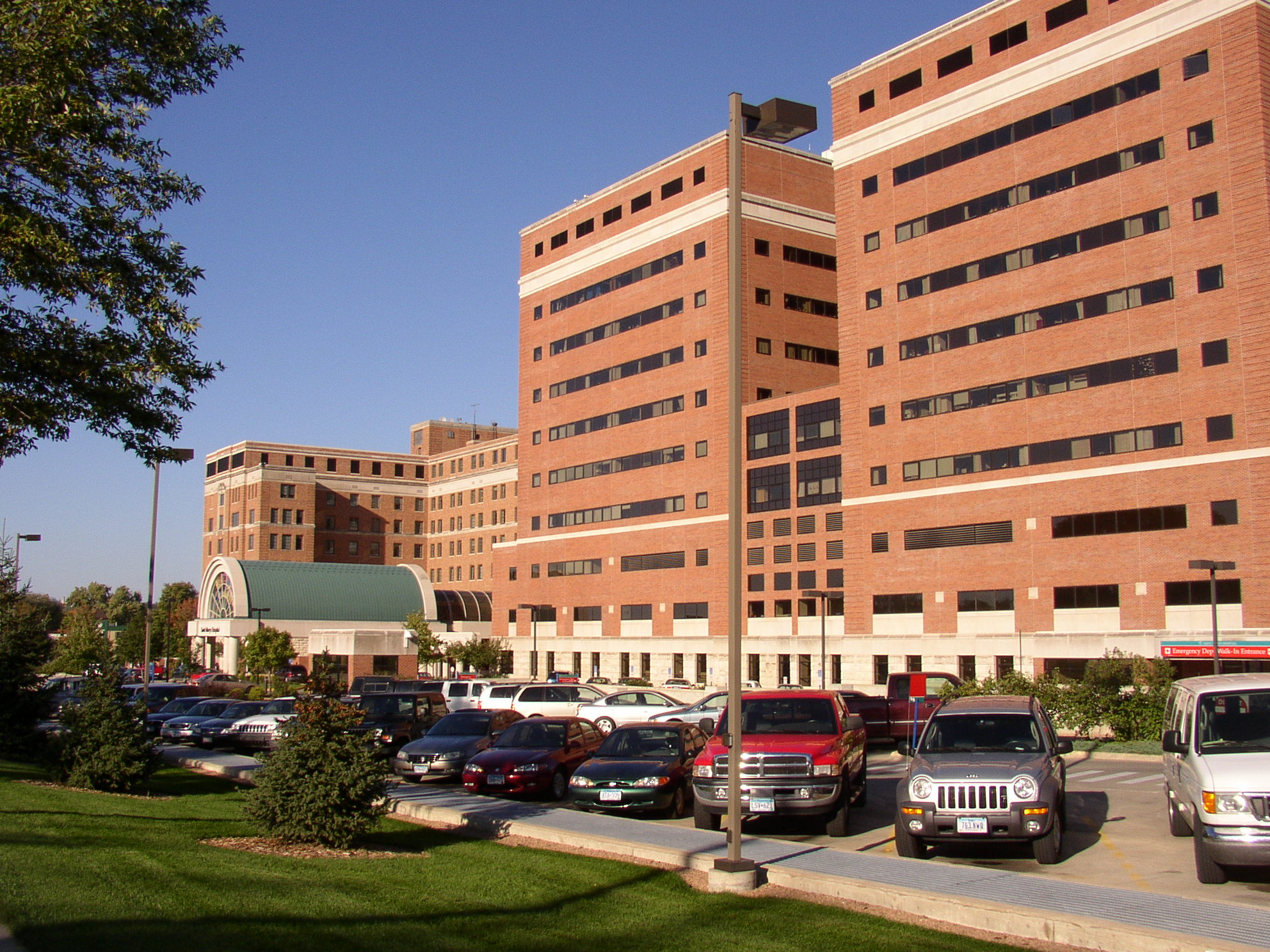
Mayo Clinic Hospital – Rochester, Saint Mary's Campus, main entrance

The Mayo Clinic Hospital – Rochester, Saint Mary's Campus has 1,265 licensed beds and 64 operating rooms. In 2008, there were 63,000 admissions as well as 28,000 surgical cases that took place in the hospital. The Mayo Clinic Psychiatry and Psychology Treatment Center in the Generose Building is also part of the campus. St. Mary's Hospital campus includes the nation's largest intensive care unit, which includes about 200 ICU beds and 200 "step-down" ICU beds.

The hospital is accredited as a Level I trauma center and stroke center. It is the seat of the Southern Minnesota Regional Trauma Advisory Committee, serving a population of almost 900,000.

Saint Mary's has a more than 76-bed emergency department but no obstetrics department, while Rochester Methodist lacks an emergency department but contains an obstetrics department. Saint Mary's Hospital Emergency Department provides care for approximately 80,000 patients per year, serving the local population (constituting about 85% of patients) and being a referral for southern and central Minnesota, northern Iowa and western Wisconsin through the Mayo Clinic Ambulance Service - Mayo One Air Ambulance service, and throughout the rest of the United States and portions of Canada with their medical transport airplane. The Emergency Department includes a state of the art electronic all comprehensive patient flow system (known as "Yes"), 6 large trauma bays, one of which being dedicated to pediatric patients, universal (ICU capable) rooms, a dedicated pediatric area, high acuity beds, 9 bed observation unit, fast-track/intake, slit lamp room, 4 psychiatry-specific beds, acclimatized ambulance entrance and garage. St Mary's also has a multiple dedicated trauma/surgical ICU's and hybrid operating rooms to provide the highest level of trauma care for the surrounding community.

=== Mayo Eugenio Litta Children's Hospital ===
The Saint Mary's Campus houses the 148-bed Mayo Eugenio Litta Children's Hospital, offering multidisciplinary pediatric and adolescent care to infants, children, teens, and young adults aged 0–21. Mayo Clinic Children's Center includes providers from over 40 medical and surgical specialties. The new hospital was opened in 1996 at a cost of $13 million. The hospital was named after Eugenio Litta, a 14-year-old boy who died from a ruptured appendix. The hospital ranks nationally in 6 different pediatric specialties.

== Methodist Campus ==
The Mayo Clinic Hospital – Rochester, Methodist Campus has 794 licensed beds and 51 operating rooms. The campus includes the Richard O. Jacobson Building, home to the proton beam therapy program.

== Rankings ==
In 2016–17, Mayo Clinic, Rochester, was ranked as the #1 overall hospital in the United States by U.S. News & World Report. A total of almost 5,000 hospitals were considered and ranked in 16 specialties from cancer and heart disease to respiratory disorders and urology; 153 (just over 3 percent of the total) were ranked in at least one of the 16 specialties. Of the 153 hospitals that are ranked in one or more specialties, 20 qualified for the Honor Roll by earning high scores in at least six specialties. Mayo Clinic, Rochester, was ranked in the top 10 in all but one of 16 specialties, in the top 4 in 13 specialties, and was the #1 ranked hospital in 8 of the 12 data-driven specialties. This year U.S. News expanded their common procedures and conditions list to 9 individual measures, and Mayo was one of fewer than 70 hospitals to score High Performing in every category. Additionally, Mayo was the only hospital on the 2016–2017 honor roll to also receive 5 stars from CMS. Every Mayo Clinic hospital received an "A" safety rating from Leapfrog in its April 2017 report. In 2019–20, Mayo Clinic, Rochester, was ranked again as the #1 overall hospital in the United States by U.S. News & World Report.

Ranked 1st

- Diabetes and Endocrinology
- Gastroenterology
- Geriatrics
- Gynecology
- Nephrology
- Neurology and Neurosurgery
- Pulmonology
- Urology

Ranked 2nd

- Cardiology and Heart Surgery
- Ear, Nose and Throat
- Orthopedics

Ranked 3rd – 6th

- Cancer (3rd)
- Rheumatology (4th)
- Rehabilitation (6th)
- Psychiatry (6th)

High-Performing

- Ophthalmology

== See also ==
- Mayo Clinic Arizona
- Mayo Clinic Florida
- Mayo Clinic College of Medicine and Science
- Mayo Clinic Cancer Center
