= Mayo Clinic Arizona =

Mayo Clinic Hospital (Phoenix)
- Mayo Clinic

Geography
- Location: 5777 E. Mayo Blvd., Phoenix, Arizona, United States
- Coordinates: 33.659355°N 111.956432°W

Organization
- Care system: Private
- Type: General
- Affiliated university: Arizona State University. Mayo Clinic Alix School of Medicine

Services
- Standards: Joint Commission accredited
- Emergency department: Yes
- Beds: 368

History
- Opened: June 1987

Links
- Website: mayoclinic.org
- Lists: Hospitals in Arizona

Mayo Clinic Arizona is a multi-campus medical clinic and tertiary medical center in Phoenix, Arizona. Its two main campuses are the outpatient clinic building, situated in east Scottsdale, Arizona, and the Arizona Hospital, located in north Phoenix, Arizona. Additionally, satellite primary care clinics around the Phoenix metropolitan are located in Phoenix, Scottsdale, Glendale, and Chandler. The hospital and clinics provide inpatient and outpatient medical services to patients from around the world. It is an academic medical center that houses a number of graduate medical education programs (residencies).

== History ==
After opening a second branch of the Mayo Clinic in Jacksonville, Florida in 1986, the Mayo Clinic opened a third branch in Scottsdale, Arizona in June 1987. The initial staff in Scottsdale included 47 physicians and 225 allied health workers. The Scottsdale campus includes the Mayo Clinic Building, the Samuel C. Johnson Research Building and the Mayo Clinic Collaborative Research Building. Later, a hospital campus was added in Phoenix, fourteen miles away.

In 2018, the Mayo Clinic announced a $648 million expansion called Arizona.Bold.Forward. to nearly double the size of its campus in Phoenix by 2024. The Mayo Clinic Alix School of Medicine expanded its four-year medical school class to the Mayo Clinic Arizona campus in 2017.

== Health services ==
Health services offered at the Mayo Clinic in Phoenix include: Aerospace Medicine, Allergic Diseases, Anesthesiology and Perioperative Medicine, Audiology, Bariatric Medicine, Breast Clinic, Cardiovascular Medicine, Cardiovascular Surgery, Clinical Genomics, Colon and Rectal Surgery, Comprehensive Cancer Care (CAR-T therapy, Proton Beam therapy), Cosmetic Medicine, Critical Care, Dermatology, Emergency Medicine, Endocrinology, Executive Health Program, Family Medicine, Gastroenterology and Hepatology, General Internal Medicine, General Surgery, Head and Neck Surgery, Hematology, Hepatobiliary and Pancreas Surgery, Hospice, Hospital Internal Medicine, Infectious Disease, Integrative Medicine, Laboratory Medicine and Pathology, Lung Cancer Program, Mayo Clinic Medallion Program, Nephrology and Hypertension, Neurology, Neurosurgery, Nicotine Dependence Center, Nursing, Occupational Medicine, Oncology, Ophthalmology, Orthopedic Surgery, Otolaryngology (ENT), Pain Medicine, Pain Rehabilitation Center, Peripheral Nerve Clinic, Pharmacogenomics, Physical Medicine and Rehabilitation, Plastic and Reconstructive Surgery, Primary Care, Psychiatry and Psychology, Pulmonary Medicine, Radiation Oncology, Radiology, Regenerative Medicine, Rheumatology, Sleep Medicine, Sports Medicine, Surgery, Surgical Oncology and Endocrine Surgery, Thoracic Surgery, Transplant Center: Bone Marrow Transplant, Heart Transplant, Kidney Transplant, Liver Transplant, Lung Transplant (to begin 2024), Pancreas Transplant, Urology, Vascular Surgery, Women's Health.

== Latest rankings ==
As of 2023, Mayo Clinic Hospital in Arizona has been ranked No.1 in Arizona and the Phoenix metro area as part of U.S. News & World Report’s “Best Hospitals” rankings. In addition, for a sixth consecutive year, Mayo Clinic in Arizona was recognized on the "Best Hospitals Honor Roll" which recognizes the top 20 hospitals in the nation.

In 2023, Mayo Clinic in Arizona received a high-performing rating in 19 of 20 procedures and conditions assessed by U.S. News & World Report. In addition, Mayo Clinic in Arizona ranked nationally in these 10 specialties:

- Cancer
- Cardiology and Heart Surgery
- Diabetes and Endocrinology
- Ear, Nose and Throat
- Gastroenterology and GI Surgery
- Geriatrics
- Neurology and Neurosurgery
- Orthopedics
- Pulmonology and Lung Surgery
- Urology

== See also ==
- Mayo Clinic Hospital (Rochester)
- Mayo Clinic Florida
- Mayo Clinic Alix School of Medicine
- Mayo Clinic Cancer Center
