= Oncocare =

Oncocare Cancer Treatment Centre

Geography
- Location: Harare, Zimbabwe

Organisation
- Care system: Private

History
- Opened: 2016

Links
- Website: oncocare.co.zw

Oncocare Cancer Treatment Centre is a cancer treatment clinic in Harare. Founded in 2016, Oncocare offers radiation treatment, chemotherapy and treatment support, and has a specialist cancer retail pharmacy. Its equipment includes the only digital linear accelerator in Zimbabwe. Oncocare is the only private medical institution in the country exclusively treating cancer.

== Background and history ==
For years, Zimbabwe had been grappling with the shortage of cancer drugs and cancer specialists. It also lacked adequate information on the disease and a cancer policy to guide medical practitioners. The state-run hospitals in Harare and Bulawayo had provided services to cancer patients, but could not afford modern equipment and practices. The national healthcare budget of Zimbabwe is permanently strained because 15% of adult population have HIV.

Oncocare Cancer Treatment Centre was opened in the Newlands suburb of Harare in August 2016. The initial investment was $10 million. Oncocare was the first privately run advanced cancer treatment and screening facility in Zimbabwe.

Due to high costs related to cancer treatment, many Zimbabweans had been flying out of the country for treatment to countries such as India and South Africa. Ben Deda, the founder and CEO of Oncocare, publicly encouraged Morgan Tsvangirai, a prominent politician who had been diagnosed with cancer of the colon and had been receiving treatment in South Africa, to approach Oncocare instead of going abroad to get the same level of medical help.

In February 2017, Oncocare asked the Zimbabwean government for a special approval to bring in foreign experts to improve cancer-related services being offered by local specialists. In the same month, Donance Kangausaru, one of Zimbabwe's first men to go public about their HIV status, successfully got his eye tumor removed in Oncocare.

== Treatments ==
Oncocare offers sub-specialties in cancer care that include radiation treatment (2D, 3D, IMRT), medical oncology (chemotherapy) with dedicated hospital mixing pharmacy, treatment support (immunity support, palliative care, pain management) and a specialist cancer retail pharmacy. A mosaic oncology information system is used for error reduction. The hospital has the only digital linear accelerator in Zimbabwe. Its team of medical specialists includes oncologists, radiologists, pathologists, medical physicists, dosimetrists, physicians, biomedical engineers, and experts in oncology pharmaceuticals.

A crucial role of the centre is to disseminate information on cancer prevention. More than 7,000 patients in Zimbabwe are diagnosed with cancer annually, and 1,200 of them die. The bulk of cases are detected in the last two stages of the disease, which has been attributed to the lack of awareness among communities. The hospital's database doubles as a cancer information centre, since there is a lack of local data.
