= Zhejiang Cancer Hospital =

Hospital in Hangzhou, China

Zhejiang Cancer Hospital is a government-run cancer hospital located in Hangzhou, China.

Zhejiang Cancer Hospital became the affiliated Cancer Hospital of university of Chinese Academy of Sciences, and the hosting hospital of Institute of Cancer Research and Basic Medical Science of Chinese Academy of Medical Sciences on May 9, 2019 (Official announcement).

The hospital offers medical services to cancer patients from Zhejiang province and nearby regions. The hospital was established in 1963 as one of the four earliest cancer hospitals in China. The hospital also houses the Zhejiang Cancer Research Institute, where scientists and cancer clinicians perform research to find methods for curing cancer.

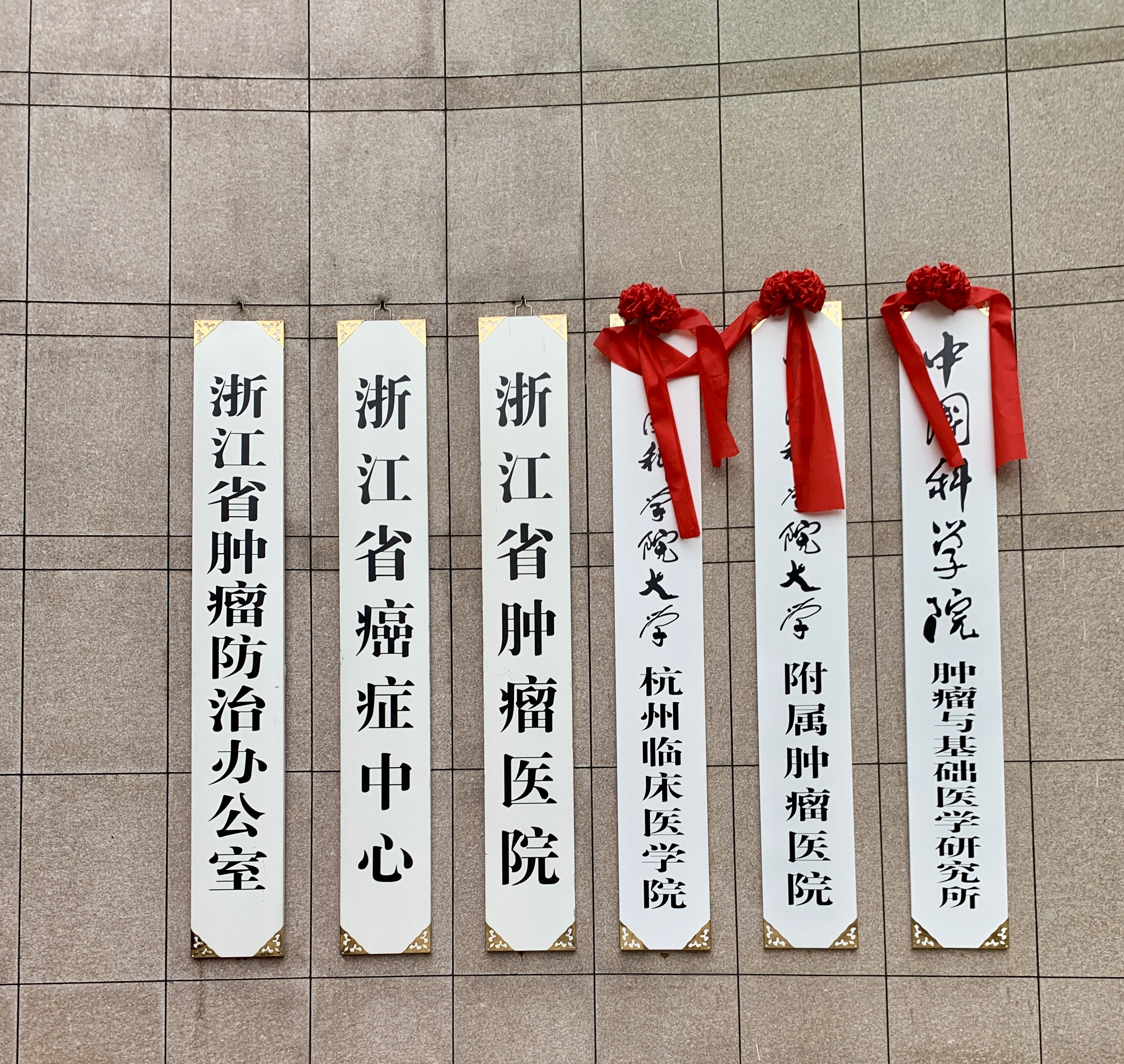
HOSPITAL TITLE
