= Nuclear Medicine, Oncology and Radiotherapy Institute =

- Pakistan Atomic Energy Commission

Geography
- Location: G-8/3, Islamabad, Islamabad Capital Territory, Pakistan
- Coordinates: 33°41′57″N 73°03′12″E

Organisation
- Care system: Public
- Type: Specialist
- Affiliated university: College of Physicians and Surgeons of Pakistan

Services
- Speciality: Oncology, Nuclear medicine, Radiotherapy

History
- Founded: 1983

Links
- Website: noripaec.pk

Nuclear Medicine, Oncology and Radiotherapy Institute (NORI) is the 7th Cancer hospital and research centre; established by Pakistan Atomic Energy Commission (PAEC) in 1983 at Islamabad, adjacent to the Pakistan Institute of Medical Sciences (PIMS) to cater patients from Islamabad and adjoining areas. NORI, one of the 19 cancer hospitals run by PAEC, is the first institute which has been recognized by College of Physicians and Surgeons of Pakistan (CPSP) for training of Fellows of College of Physicians and Surgeons (FCPS) in Nuclear Medicine and radiotherapy. Various research projects sponsored by the International Atomic Energy Agency (IAEA) and the World Health Organization (WHO), are underway in the NORI Cancer Hospital. The hospital is providing treatment facilities to about 40,000 patients from Islamabad, Hazara, Jhelum, Sargodha, Azad Kashmir, etc.

In 2023, the International Atomic Energy Agency (IAEA) designated Pakistan's Nuclear Medicine, Oncology and Radiotherapy Institute (NORI) as an 'anchor centre' under its 'Rays of Hope Initiative' to help enhance the country's capabilities in cancer research.

== Units and departments ==
The Institute has the following departments:

- Nuclear Medicine Department
- Radiotherapy & Oncology Department
- Medical Physics Department

== Projects ==
The following projects are underway in the Institution. Some of them are recently completed.

- Study of relationship between gastroesophageal reflux, recurrent lower respiratory tract infection and bronchial asthma in infants and children.
- To assess the diagnostic accuracy of Tc-99m MIBI Planar and SPECT in differentiating scarred tissues from recurrence of cancer after breast surgery.
- Nuclear medicine and Radiotherapy support.
- Thematic health programme.
- Radiotherapy
- Clinical application of radiosensitizers in cancer radiotherapy in Pakistan.
- Randomized clinical trial of radiotherapy combined with Mitomycin-C.
- Randomized Multi Center study of radiotherapy in the treatment of Squamous Cell Carcinoma of Head and Neck.
- Incidence of hypercalcemia in solid malignancies.
- Role of gemcitabine as radiation sensitizer.

== See also ==
- Nuclear medicine in Pakistan
- List of Cancer Hospitals (Pakistan)
