= Mayo Clinic School of Health Sciences =

Private, not-for-profit school

- Former name: Mayo School of Health Sciences (until 2017)
- Type: Private (nonprofit) allied health school
- Established: 1973
- Parent institution: Mayo Clinic College of Medicine and Science
- Dean: Michael H. Silber, M.B., Ch.B.
- Academic staff: 300
- Students: 1831
- Location: Rochester, Minnesota, US; 44.0213°N 92.4670°W
- Website: college.mayo.edu/academics/health-sciences-education/

The Mayo Clinic School of Health Sciences (MCSHS; formerly known as Mayo School of Health Sciences) is an accredited, private, nonprofit school of higher education specializing in allied health education. MCSHS operates within the Mayo Clinic College of Medicine and Science, which is the educational division of Mayo Clinic. As such, MCSHS is fully integrated with Mayo Clinic hospitals and clinics.

More than 1800 students are enrolled in MCSHS annually. This includes 120 unique academic programs and clinical experiences in more than 55 different healthcare professions. MCSHS works in affiliation with many public and private universities. In this collaborative model, students complete liberal arts and basic science requirements at an affiliate, either concurrently or before enrolling in MCSHS. As such, MCSHS offers only the specialized curriculum that would complete a specified degree or program.

== Degrees, certificates, and programs ==
MCSHS awards Doctor of Physical Therapy (DPT) and Doctor of Nurse Anesthesia Practice (DNAP) doctoral degrees.

MCSHS does not award undergraduate degrees. However, the application of a collaborative model with private and public colleges and universities allows students to earn associate degrees, bachelor's degrees, and master's degrees in several professions, along with a certificate from MCSHS. This collaborative model allows students to fulfill liberal arts and basic science prerequisites at affiliated schools prior to enrolling in professional courses at MCSHS. MCSHS also provides educational programs that culminate in the student earning a certificate rather than a degree, particularly in entry-level health professions.

In recent years, allied health education has trended toward residencies and fellowships for post professional students. In keeping with this trend, MCSHS offers a growing number of residency and fellowship programs in a variety of advanced practice professions, such as Nurse Practitioner, Physician Assistant, Physical Therapist, Occupational Therapist, Medical Physicist, and Surgical First Assistant (Surgeon's assistant). Additionally, MCSHS offers a limited number of courses and programs for practicing professionals to enhance their clinical knowledge, similar to continuing education.

== Accreditation and authorization ==
The Mayo Clinic College of Medicine and Science is accredited by the Higher Learning Commission, with certain programs also receiving accreditation from their specific professional organizations as shown below. MCSHS is recognized in Minnesota by the Minnesota Office of Higher Education; in Florida by the Florida Department of Education Commission for Independent Education; and in Arizona by the Arizona State Board for Private Postsecondary Education. The School is also an active member of the Association of Schools of Allied Health Professions.

== Honors ==
Mayo Clinic (Rochester, MN) was ranked the #1 hospital in the nation for 2018-2019 by U.S. News & World Report. In 2016, Mayo Clinic School of Health Sciences was recognized by U.S. News & World Report for its Nurse Anesthesia and Physical Therapy programs, ranked 10th and 20th, respectively.

== History ==
Mayo Clinic School of Health Sciences was founded in 1973 to provide essential education for a variety of clinical departments. The precursor to the school was the nurse anesthesia program. Mayo's first health sciences professional, Edith Graham Mayo, was trained as a nurse anesthetist in 1889. Today, this is the oldest continuously running nurse anesthesia program in the country.

In 1906, Saint Mary's Hospital Training School for Nurses was founded. The Colonial Hospital Training School for Nurses was established in 1918. While neither school exists today, Mayo Clinic currently offers many nursing education programs.

In 1936, the Mayo Physical Therapy Program was established, setting the standard for education in its field. Programs in clinical pastoral education and medical social service were created in order to address patient care needs.

Between 1960 and 1980, healthcare underwent major transformations in clinical practice and technology, leading to the creation of Mayo Clinic programs in cytotechnology, nuclear medicine technology, occupational therapy, pharmacy services, recreational therapy, respiratory therapy and surgical technology.

Between 1980 and 2000, changes in healthcare delivery led to new programs in medical laboratory technology, clinical neurophysiology, radiation therapy, radiography and diagnostic medical sonography. The Nurse Practitioner Program, offered in partnership with Winona State University, was launched in 1994.

MCSHS marked its 25th anniversary in 1998 with the creation of the Mayo Clinic School of Health Sciences Alumni Association.

== Location ==
Mayo Clinic School of Health Sciences operates at the three campuses of Mayo Clinic, which are located in Rochester, MN; Scottsdale and Phoenix, AZ; and Jacksonville, FL.
