= Larkana Institute of Nuclear Medicine and Radiotherapy =

The Larkana Institute of Nuclear Medicine and Radiotherapy (LINAR), also known as LINAR Cancer Hospital Larkana, is a medical facility specializing in cancer treatment located in Larkana, Sindh. It is one of several research institutes established by the Pakistan Atomic Energy Commission (PAEC) across the country to combat cancer using nuclear medicine techniques.

== History and purpose ==
LINAR is part of a network of cancer hospitals and research centers set up by the PAEC since 1956. These institutions utilize nuclear medicine for the diagnosis and treatment of cancer and allied diseases.
