= Institute of Radiotherapy and Nuclear Medicine =

- Pakistan Atomic Energy Commission

Geography
- Location: Peshawar, Khyber Pakhtunkhwa, Pakistan
- Coordinates: 33.998780°N 71.485156°E

Organisation
- Affiliated university: Khyber Medical College

History
- Opened: 1975

Links
- Lists: Hospitals in Pakistan

The Institute of Radiotherapy and Nuclear Medicine (IRNUM; Urdu: جوہری طبی اور شعاعي علاج کا ادارہ) is located at Khyber Medical College in Peshawar, Khyber Pakhtunkhwa, Pakistan. The facility is one of 18 cancer hospitals operated by the Pakistan Atomic Energy Commission or PAEC. The PAEC has made a priority to apply nuclear technology in order to improve Pakistan's health sector. IRNUM patients receive state-of-the-art diagnostic and treatment either free of charge or at subsidized rates and is also involved in the "National Cancer Awareness & Prevention Program".

IRNUM was established in 1975, becoming the first and largest cancer hospital built in Khyber Pakhtunkhwa province. The objectives of the institution are to diagnose and treat cancer patients and provide them complete cure and control. The institute also arranges seminars and workshops for cancer awareness and control. The hospital covers patients from Khyber Pakhtunkhwa province and adjoining areas and provides treatment and diagnosis to 53,000 patients per year from the province, including patients from Afghanistan. This is the 5th institution working under the patronage of Pakistan Atomic Energy Commission and has the flowing units:

- Radiotherapy Department
- Nuclear Medicine Department
- Pathology Department
- Brachytherapy Department

== See also ==
- Nuclear medicine in Pakistan
- Institute of Nuclear Medicine, Oncology and Radiotherapy
