= Medical Scientist Training Program =

MD–PhD training programs

The Medical Scientist Training Programs (MSTPs) are dual-degree training programs that streamline the education towards both clinical (typically MD) and research doctoral degrees. MSTPs are offered by some United States medical schools, who are awarded financial support from the National Institute of General Medical Sciences, a branch of the National Institutes of Health (NIH). The goal of these training programs is to produce physician scientists who can translate laboratory discoveries into effective treatments for patients.

The NIH began awarding the MSTP designation in 1964. Albert Einstein College of Medicine, Northwestern University, and New York University were the original three MSTP programs that were established. As of 2026, there were 69 NIH-funded MSTP programs in the US (64 MD-PhD, 1 DO-PhD, 4 DVM-PhD), supporting over 5000 students at all stages of the program.

== History ==
The program has its origins in the non-NIH funded MD-PhD training offered at the nation's research-centric medical schools. An early dual-degree program began at Case Western Reserve University School of Medicine in 1956. Other prominent medical schools quickly followed this example and developed integrated MD-PhD training structures.

In 1964, the NIH created the Medical Scientist Training Program to begin funding this medical and research education. Albert Einstein College of Medicine, Northwestern University, and New York University were the original three MSTP programs that were established. The former, Albert Einstein College of Medicine, being the only medical institution that has received continuous funding since the grant's inception.

In 2022, the NIH announced the Leading Equity and Advancing Diversity in the Medical Scientist Training Program (LEAD MSTP). The LEAD MSTP shares a similar goal to the MSTP by supporting dual-degree training programs, but at institutions that have not historically been well represented among NIH-funded MSTPs. LEAD MSTP awards are limited to programs at historically Black colleges and universities, tribal colleges and universities, and institutions in Institutional Development Award (IDeA)-eligible states. The first LEAD MSTP program was established at the University of Nebraska Medical Center in 2024. As of 2025, there are 2 NIH-funded LEAD MSTP programs in the US.

== Admissions ==
Admission to MSTPs is the most competitive of all graduate medical education programs in the country.

In 2025, 702 of the 2,040 applicants successfully matriculated into MD-PhD programs (34.42%). Moreover, an estimated 556 of these matriculants enrolled in MSTPs, resulting in a national MSTP matriculation rate of 27.25%.

In comparison, MD-only programs had 23,440 positions for a total of 54,699 applicants (a 42.85% matriculation rate) in 2025. At each institution, these acceptance rates are varied and are often far more competitive than the national data. Applicants must have very strong MCAT scores and GPAs to be considered for positions in MSTP. Reflecting this fact, from 2025 to 2026 the average GPA and MCAT for matriculants to MD-PhD programs were 3.86 and 516.3, respectively. MSTP applicants will often have very strong research experience as well, in addition to the typical qualifications required from MD-only applicants.

Interviews for admissions at MSTPs tend to focus on the applicant's career goals and past experiences in scientific research. These may include short research talks or presentations followed by rigorous questioning by an interviewer or interviewing committee. MSTP applicants are often required to demonstrate a deep understanding of their past research projects. Multiple interview sessions conducted by different interviewers that last for 2 days are very common. At some MSTPs, applicants may also be required (or be offered the chance) to interview with the MD-only program.

== Financial support ==
MSTP matriculants receive substantial financial awards that make them financially competitive to their MD-only counterparts even with the longer training periods. These allowances cover all tuition expenses, provide travel and supply allowances, and accommodate living expenses through an annual stipend (ranging from $26,000 to $39,000). Overall grants typically range from $600,000 - $1,000,000. These monetary awards compare to approximately $250,000 of pre-tax income.

Since MSTP grants are a type of National Research Service Award, students must be nationals (citizens or noncitizens) of the United States or possess a I-151 or I-551 alien registration receipt. However many MSTPs offer non-MSTP grant funded positions, allowing for non-citizens and non-legalized nationals to be accepted into the MD-PhD program at that particular school. These programs are indistinguishable between the students besides the funding source. Furthermore, many non-MSTP medical schools have MD-PhD programs that are not supported by the NIH but offer similar training opportunities and grant stipends.

== Allied-institution programs ==
Several MSTPs allow for the PhD portion of the MSTP to be completed outside the home university at an allied institution. These relationships provide additional and sometimes stronger research opportunities to students in these MSTPs.

== Program(s) (MD-PhD) ==
| No. | Institution | Year Founded | State | Allied Institution(s) |
|---|---|---|---|---|
| 1 | Albert Einstein College of Medicine | 1964 | NY | |
| 2 | Northwestern University | 1964 | IL | |
| 3 | Duke University | 1966 | NC | |
| 4 | Stanford University | 1968 | CA | |
| 5 | University of Chicago | 1968 | IL | |
| 6 | University of Wisconsin-Madison | 1968 | WI | |
| 7 | Columbia University | 1969 | NY | |
| 8 | University of Pennsylvania | 1969 | PA | Children's Hospital of Philadelphia |
| 9 | Washington University in St. Louis | 1969 | MO | |
| 10 | Yale University | 1969 | CT | |
| 11 | University of Washington | 1970 | WA | Fred Hutchinson Cancer Research Center; Seattle Children's Research Institute; Benaroya Research Institute |
| 12 | University of Rochester | 1973 | NY | |
| 13 | Cornell University | 1974 | NY | Memorial Sloan-Kettering Cancer Center; The Rockefeller University |
| 14 | Harvard University | 1974 | MA | Massachusetts Institute of Technology |
| 15 | Case Western Reserve University | 1975 | OH | Cleveland Clinic |
| 16 | Johns Hopkins University | 1975 | MD | |
| 17 | University of California, San Diego | 1975 | CA | Salk Institute; The Scripps Research Institute; Sanford-Burnham Medical Research Institute; La Jolla Institute for Allergy and Immunology |
| 18 | Baylor College of Medicine | 1976 | TX | Rice University |
| 19 | Emory University | 1976 | GA | Georgia Institute of Technology |
| 20 | Mount Sinai School of Medicine | 1976 | NY | |
| 21 | University of Iowa | 1976 | IA | |
| 22 | University of Virginia | 1976 | VA | |
| 23 | Vanderbilt University | 1976 | TN | |
| 24 | University of California, San Francisco | 1977 | CA | University of California, Berkeley |
| 25 | University of Michigan | 1980 | MI | |
| 26 | Oregon Health & Science University | 1982 | OR | |
| 27 | University of Texas Southwestern | 1982 | TX | |
| 28 | University of California, Los Angeles | 1983 | CA | California Institute of Technology |
| 29 | Mayo Clinic College of Medicine and Science | 1986 | MN | |
| 30 | University of Pittsburgh | 1987 | PA | Carnegie Mellon University |
| 31 | University of Minnesota | 1988 | MN | |
| 32 | University of Arizona | 1990 | AZ | |
| 33 | Stony Brook University | 1992 | NY | Cold Spring Harbor Laboratory; Brookhaven National Laboratory |
| 34 | University of Alabama at Birmingham | 1992 | AL | |
| 35 | Indiana University | 1993 | IN | Purdue University |
| 36 | University of Colorado Denver | 1993 | CO | University of Colorado Boulder; National Jewish Health |
| 37 | Tufts University | 1994 | MA | |
| 38 | Medical University of South Carolina | 1999 | SC | |
| 39 | University of California, Irvine | 1999 | CA | |
| 40 | University of North Carolina at Chapel Hill | 1999 | NC | North Carolina State University |
| 41 | University of Cincinnati | 2002 | OH | Cincinnati Children's Hospital Medical Center |
| 42 | University of Illinois Chicago | 2007 | IL | |
| 43 | Medical College of Wisconsin | 2010 | WI | |
| 44 | University of Maryland, Baltimore | 2010 | MD | University of Maryland, College Park; NIH Intramural Research Program |
| 45 | Ohio State University | 2011 | OH | |
| 46 | University of Massachusetts | 2013 | MA | |
| 47 | Penn State University | 2016 | PA | |
| 48 | University of Miami | 2017 | FL | |
| 49 | University of Texas Health Science Center at Houston | 2018 | TX | University of Texas MD Anderson Cancer Center |
| 50 | University of Texas Health Science Center at San Antonio | 2018 | TX | Texas Biomedical Research Institute |
| 51 | University of Kansas Medical Center | 2020 | KS | Stowers Institute for Medical Research |
| 52 | Virginia Commonwealth University | 2022 | VA | |
| 53 | University of Utah | 2023 | UT | |
| 54 | University of Nebraska Medical Center | 2024 (Note: LEAD MSTP) | NE | |
| 55 | University of New Mexico | 2024 (Note: LEAD MSTP) | NM | |
| 56 | Boston University | 2025 | MA | |
| 57 | Meharry Medical College | 2025 | TN | |
| 58 | Georgetown University | 2026 | D.C. | |
| 59 | Hofstra/Northwell | 2026 | NY | Cold Spring Harbor Laboratory; Feinstein Institutes for Medical Research |
| 60 | Tulane University | 2026 | LA | |
| 61 | University of Arkansas | 2026 | AR | |
| 62 | University of Florida | 2026 | FL | |
| 63 | University of Louisville | 2026 | KY | |
| 64 | University of Mississippi Medical Center | 2026 | MS | |

== Program(s) (DO-PhD) ==
| No. | Institution | Year Founded | State |
|---|---|---|---|
| 1 | Michigan State University | 2025 | MI |

== Program(s) (DVM-PhD) ==
| No. | Institution | Year Founded | State |
|---|---|---|---|
| 1 | University of Pennsylvania | 1977 (Note: UPenn united their MD–PhD and VMD–PhD programs under one MSTP T32 grant in 1977) | PA |
| 2 | Colorado State University | 2020 | CO |
| 3 | University of California, Davis | 2020 | CA |
| 4 | Cornell University | 2023 (Note: Cornell has an MSTP T32 for their MD–PhD program and a separate MSTP T32 for their DVM–PhD program) | NY |

== Outcomes ==
According to a 2010 report of students from the 1970s-2010s, 95% of MSTP graduates entered a residency program after graduation.

Applicants for NIH research grants that completed an MSTP program were three times more likely to be successfully funded than graduates with an MD/PhD that did not participate in an MSTP program.

== Non-MSTP MD-PhD programs ==
A number of medical schools without NIH-funded MSTP grant slots maintain their own non-MSTP MD-PhD combined degree programs, sometimes offering full or partial student financial support funded by the schools themselves. As of 2026, 63 institutions provide a means for non-MSTP MD-PhD education in the United States. Internationally, there are 34 non-US institutions that provide MD–PhD training.

== See also ==
- American Physician Scientists Association
