= Fuda Cancer Hospital-Guangzhou =

- Guangzhou Fuda Healthcare Corporation Limited

Geography
- Location: Guangzhou, Guangdong, China
- Coordinates: 23.08356°N 113.32957°E

Organisation
- Care system: Private
- Type: Specialized hospital
- Affiliated university: Jinan University Medical School

Services
- Standards: Chinese Medicine Association
- Emergency department: Yes
- Beds: 400

History
- Founded: 2001

Links
- Website: www.fudacancerhospital.org
- Lists: Hospitals in China

Guangzhou Fuda Cancer Hospital is a tertiary specialized cancer hospital affiliated with the Health Department of Guangdong Province in China. It was designated a national key clinical (cancer) hospital by the National Health and Family Planning Commission in 2011. The same year, Guangzhou Fuda Cancer Hospital was honored with National Trustworthy Private Hospital by the National Institute of Hospital Administration. In 2012, China Hospital Association rated Guangzhou Fuda Cancer Hospital as China Public Confidence Model Hospital. It was accredited by JCI in 2014.

Guangzhou Fuda Cancer Hospital has locations in Tianhe District (located in the 2nd, Tangde Xi Road, Tianhe District, Guangzhou), and one in Haizhu District (located in Jude Zhong Road, Haizhu District, Guangzhou). The hospital has so far received more than 15 million RMB (~$2.5 million USD) of cancer research grant.

Guangzhou Fuda Cancer Hospital primarily treats patients with medium or advanced cancer diagnoses. It applies the 3C+P treatment model composed of cryosurgical ablation (CSA), cancer microsphere intervention (CMI), combined immunotherapy (CIC including NK and CAR-T cell immunotherapy), and personalized treatment which strives for the prolongement and improvement patients' lives.

Guangzhou Fuda Cancer Hospital is known for treating a wide range of cancers, specializing in the treatment of lung cancer, liver cancer, and pancreatic cancer.

== Departments ==
Guangzhou Fuda Cancer Hospital contains Oncology, Internal Medicine, Surgery, Gynecology, Pediatric Department, Ophthalmology, Otorhinolaryngology, Stomatology, Dermatology, Rehabilitation Medicine, Palliative Care, Anesthesia, Pain Management, Pathology, Traditional Chinese Medicine, Imaging Department etc. There are also several research departments in Fuda Cancer Hospital, including Fuda Cancer Prevention and Rehabilitation Center, Central Laboratory, Union Laboratory, Biotherapy Center.

== Locations ==
=== North Campus ===
Address: No 2, Tangde Xi Rd, Tianhe District, Guangzhou, China, 510665.

=== South Campus ===
Address: 91, 93 Jude Zhong Rd, Chigang District, Guangzhou, China, 510305.

== Treatments ==
Guangzhou Fuda Cancer Hospital practices irreversible electroporation, cryoablation, combined immunotherapy, microvascular intervention, brachytherapy, photodynamic therapy, TCM and other therapies in clinical treatments.

== Honors ==
- 2007 Philippine College for Advancement in Medicine Foundation
- 2009 Guangzhou Fuda Cancer Hospital was voted "National Best Cancer Hospital"
- 2010 Guangzhou Fuda Cancer Hospital was rated one of "Growth-type Enterprise -- Ten Enterprises Characterized with Social Responsibility"
- 2010 Guangzhou Fuda Cancer Hospital won "2010 Innovation Hospital" honorable title
- 2011 Guangzhou Fuda Cancer Hospital was Titled "National Trustworthy Private Hospital"
- 2011 Guangzhou Fuda Cancer Hospital became one of the National Key Clinical Cancer Speciality Centres designated by the Chinese Government
- 2011 Guangzhou Fuda Cancer Hospital Oncology was awarded Key Clinical Cancer Specialty of Guangdong Province by Guangdong Health Department
