= Karachi Institute of Radiotherapy and Nuclear Medicine =

Cancer hospital in Karachi, Pakistan

The Karachi Institute of Radiotherapy and Nuclear Medicine (KIRAN) is a cancer hospital in Karachi, Pakistan under the administrative control of the Pakistan Atomic Energy Commission. KIRAN is one of nineteen medical centers in Pakistan providing patients access to diagnostic and treatment facilities either free of charge or at subsidized rates.

== Services ==
KIRAN was initially planned to have state of the art radiotherapy facilities. Subsequently, oncology and chemotherapy facilities were established to provide services at low cost to poor cancer patients in Karachi and rural areas of Sindh and Baluchistan. The hospital currently provides services in clinical oncology, nuclear medicine, radiology, and pharmacy.

Besides conducting research on cancer diagnosis and biopsies, KIRAN organizes annual activities to mark World Cancer Day.

== Research ==
From 2002 to 2006, a study was carried out to evaluate the benefits of scanning prostate cancer patients for a prostate specific antigen. Findings were published in the Journal of the Pakistan Medical Association.

== Treatment Charges ==
The costs of treatment at KIRAN are lower than at other nuclear medicine centers in Karachi, such as the AKUH, Baqai Medical University, and Liaquat National Hospital.

== See also ==
- Nuclear medicine in Pakistan
