= MD–PhD =

Dual doctoral degree for physician–scientists

The Doctor of Medicine–Doctor of Philosophy (MD–PhD) is a dual doctoral program for physician–scientists, combining the professional training of the Doctor of Medicine (M.D.) degree with the research program of the Doctor of Philosophy (Ph.D.) degree.

In the United States, the National Institutes of Health as of November 2026 provided 64 medical schools with Medical Scientist Training Program grants that supported the training of students in MD–PhD programs through tuition and stipend allowances. These programs are often competitive, with some admitting as few as two students per academic year.

The MCAT score and GPA of MD–PhD matriculants are often higher than MD only matriculants.

== Training programs ==
In the United States, MD–PhD degrees can be obtained through dual-degree programs offered at some medical schools. The idea for an integrated training program began at Case Western Reserve University School of Medicine in 1956 and quickly spread to other research medical schools.

== Training structure ==
When students enter an MD–PhD program, they typically complete the pre-clinical curriculum of medical school (2 years), transition into PhD graduate training, and finally complete clinical rotations (2 years). In the U.S., MD–PhD training during medical school is extensive and lengthy, lasting eight or more years.

Traditional PhD training involves combining course content knowledge and research skills to produce original research, culminating in a doctoral dissertation. Typically, PhD-degree completion takes 4–6 years. The MD–PhD physician-scientist workforce is a relatively small group of well-trained professionals with the research skills to address clinical and basic science research questions aimed at improving patient care.

== Post-doctoral opportunities for MD–PhD graduates ==
Most MD–PhD graduates enter academia, with their primary appointments in clinical departments. Among graduates in the very early 21st century, 95% continued clinical training, while 5% pursued postdoctoral fellowships without clinical training. The most popular residency choice was internal medicine (29%), followed by surgery (11%).

Approximately 80% of graduates were employed full-time in academic centers (1,625, or 67%), research institutes such as the NIH (105, or 4%), or in industry (189, or 8%), aligning with the goals of MD–PhD training. The remaining 16% were in private practice.

== Attrition rate ==
Despite variations in attrition rates among different schools, further investigation is needed to understand the underlying causes. For instance, the average attrition rate for students who entered programs between 1998 and 2007 was 10%, comparable to the 12% reported for MSTP-funded trainees who matriculated in the 1980s. However, this rate is considerably lower than the 29% attrition reported in 2008 by Andriole and colleagues. Attrition rates varied significantly among different schools, warranting closer scrutiny to establish cause.

According to a 2014 study by Jeffe et al., among those MD–PhD program enrollees who either graduated with MD–PhD degrees or withdrew or were dismissed from medical school, certain factors were associated with attrition. Specifically:

- Students who matriculated at non-MSTP-funded medical schools were more likely to withdraw or be dismissed.
- Underrepresented minority (URM) race or ethnicity was also associated with higher attrition rates.
- Students over 28 years of age at matriculation were more likely to leave the program.
- Gender and premedical debt were not independently associated with overall attrition, MD-only graduation, or medical-school withdrawal or dismissal.

== Funding and financial compensation ==
Typically, MD–PhD programs, cover medical school tuition and provide a stipend. MD-PhD programs receive funding from various sources, including institutional grants, individual fellowships, and support from the National Institutes of Health (NIH). NIH funding, including Medical Scientist Training Program (MSTP) grants, has played a crucial role in standardizing training approaches and ensuring program quality.

== Notable MD–PhD physician–scientists ==
- Barry Blumberg — Recipient of the 1976 Nobel Prize in Physiology or Medicine along with Daniel Gajdusek for their work on the human prion disease kuru
- Francis Collins — Former Director of the National Institutes of Health and former leader of the Human Genome Project
- James DiCarlo — computational neuroscientist and Head of the MIT Department of Brain and Cognitive Sciences
- Alfred G. Gilman — Recipient of the 1994 Nobel Prize in Physiology or Medicine along with Martin Rodbell for their discoveries regarding G-proteins
- Robert Satcher — Physician, chemical engineer, and NASA astronaut who became the first orthopedic surgeon in space during STS-129
- Vilayanur S. Ramachandran — Neuroscientist known for his work in the fields of behavioral neurology and visual psychophysics
- David Satcher — 16th Surgeon General of the United States
- Chi Van Dang — Director of the Abramson Cancer Center of the University of Pennsylvania
- Christopher Duntsch — Neurosurgeon sentenced to life in prison for intentionally botching 32 surgeries that killed two patients and paralyzed two others
- Gregg L. Semenza — Pediatrician and Professor of Genetic Medicine and Nobel Prize Winner in Medicine, subsequently retracted numerous papers.
- Joseph Ladapo — Surgeon General of Florida.
- Bruce D. Perry — Psychiatrist and researcher in children's mental health and neuroscience, known for developing the Neurosequential Model.
- Paul Farmer — Global health physician and medical anthropologist.
- Joshua A. Gordon — Former Director of the National Institute of Mental Health.
- Karl Deisseroth — Neuroscientist, Psychiatrist, D.H. Chen Professor of Bioengineering and of Psychiatry and Behavioral Sciences at Stanford University, and Investigator of the Howard Hughes Medical Institute, member of the advisory committee on the BRAIN Initiative, jointly awarded the 2026 Nobel Prize in Physiology or Medicine with Georg Nagel and Peter Hegemann.
- Emery N. Brown — Professor of Computational Neuroscience and Health Sciences and Technology, at Massachusetts Institute of Technology, and the Warren M. Zapol Professor of Anaesthesia, of Harvard Medical School, at Massachusetts General Hospital, member of the advisory committee on the BRAIN Initiative.
- Ezekiel Emanuel — American oncologist, bioethicist, and senior fellow at the Center for American Progress. Formerly a member of the COVID-19 Advisory Board.
- Arvid Carlsson — Swedish neuropharmacologist, received the 2000 Nobel Prize in Physiology or Medicine for respective research on the functioning of signal transduction proteins in learning, memory, and movement.

== See also ==
- Biomedical scientist
- DPT-MPH
- Association of American Medical Colleges
- American Physician Scientists Association
