= Ex-Rad =

Chemical compound

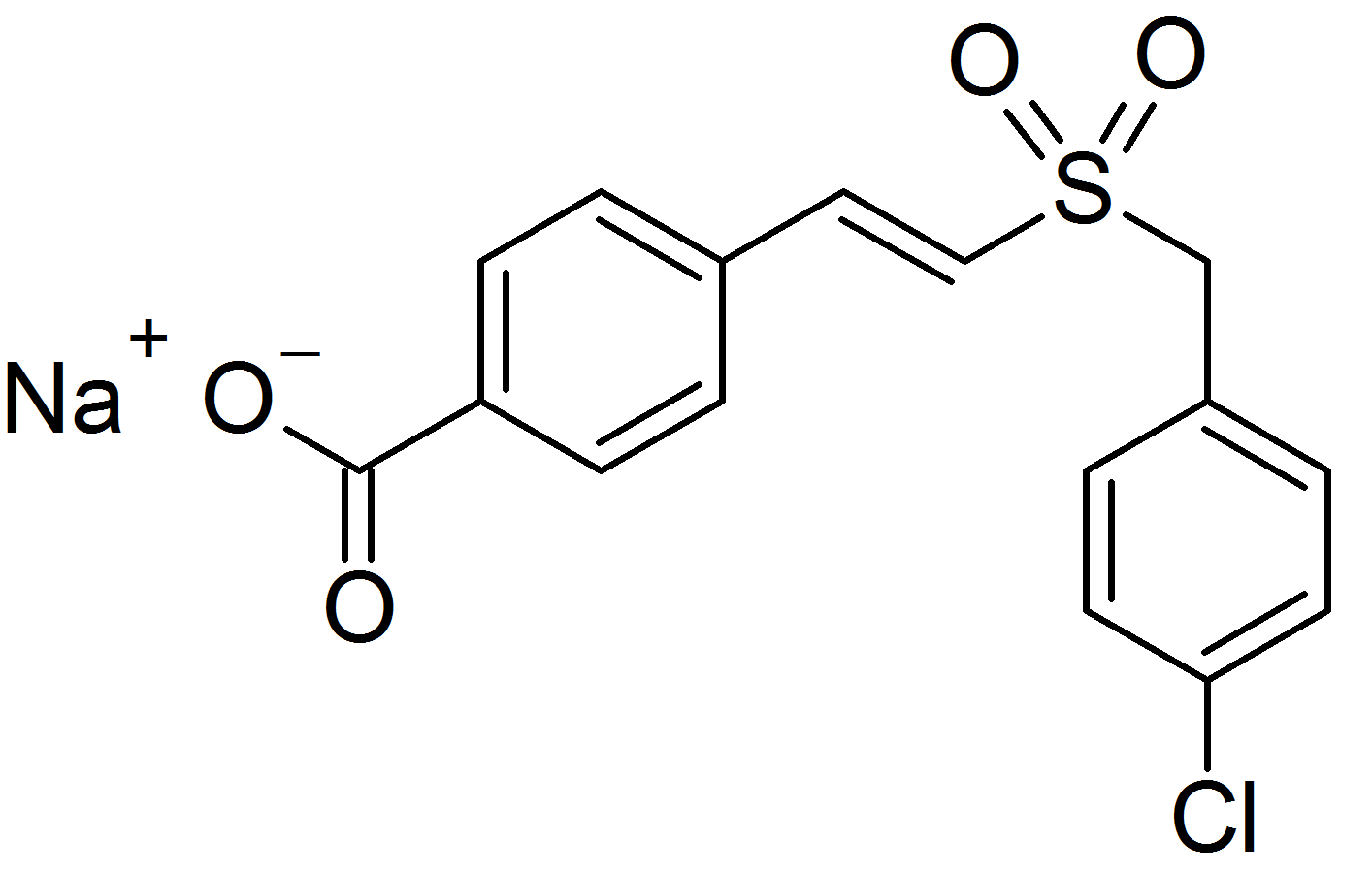

Names
- Preferred IUPAC name Sodium 4-{(1E)-2-[(4-chlorophenyl)methanesulfonyl]ethen-1-yl}benzoate

Identifiers
CAS Number	922139-31-9
3D model (JSmol)	Interactive image
ChEMBL	ChEMBL2219410
ChemSpider	17588427
KEGG	D10376
PubChem CID	23668369
UNII	1068SXU525
CompTox Dashboard (EPA)	DTXSID101336108
- InChI: InChI=1S/C16H13ClO4S.Na/c17-15-7-3-13(4-8-15)11-22(20,21)10-9-12-1-5-14(6-2-12)16(18)19;/h1-10H,11H2,(H,18,19);/q;+1/p-1/b10-9+; Key: PRFBWBYKWZVQJF-RRABGKBLSA-M
- SMILES: C1=CC(=CC=C1CS(=O)(=O)/C=C/C2=CC=C(C=C2)C(=O)[O-])Cl.[Na+]

Properties
Chemical formula	C_{16}H_{12}ClNaO_{4}S
Molar mass	358.77 g·mol^{−1}
- Except where otherwise noted, data are given for materials in their standard state (at 25 °C [77 °F], 100 kPa). verify (what is ?) Infobox references

Ex-Rad (or Ex-RAD; recilisib sodium (INN, USAN); development code ON 01210.Na) is an experimental drug being developed by Onconova Therapeutics and the U.S. Department of Defense. It is being studied as a radiation protection agent. Chemically, it is the sodium salt of 4-carboxystyryl-4-chlorobenzylsulfone.

== Clinical trials ==
The results of two Phase I clinical studies in healthy human volunteers indicate that subcutaneously injected Ex-Rad is safe and well tolerated, with "no evidence of systemic side effects". A study in mice demonstrated the efficacy of Ex-Rad by increasing the survival rate of mice exposed to typically lethal whole-body irradiation. The study tested oral and parenteral administration of Ex-Rad for both pre- and post-exposure radiomitigation.

Research on Ex-Rad has involved collaboration with the Armed Forces Radiobiology Research Institute (AFRRI), the Department of Biochemistry and Molecular & Cellular Biology at Georgetown University, Long Island University's Arnold & Marie Schwartz College of Pharmacy, and the Department of Oncological Sciences at the Mt. Sinai School of Medicine.

== Mechanism of action ==
Onconova reports that Ex-Rad protects cells exposed to radiation against DNA damage, and that the drug's mechanism of action does not involve scavenging free radicals or arresting the cell cycle. Instead, they claim it employs a "novel mechanism" involving "intracellular signaling, damage sensing, and DNA repair pathways". Ex-RAD is a chlorobenzylsulfone derivative that works after free radicals have damaged DNA. Onconova CEO Ramesh Kumar believes this is a better approach than trying to scavenge free radicals. “Free radicals are very short-lived, and so the window of opportunity to give a drug is very narrow,” he says. In cell and animal models, Ex-RAD protects hematopoietic and gastrointestinal tissues from radiation injury when given either before or after exposure.

== See also ==
- CBLB502 (Entolimod), a compound being studied for its ability to suppresses apoptotic cell death in hematopoietic and gastrointestinal cells.
- Amifostine (WR2721), the first selective-target and broad-spectrum radioprotector, upregulates DNA repair
- Filgrastim (Neupogen), a hematopoietic countermeasure of acute radiation syndrome (ARS)
- Pegfilgrastim (Neulasta), longer acting than its parent, filgrastim
- Sargramostim (leukine), similar in use to filgrastim
- N-Acetylcysteine, protects against DNA damage, suggested to be comparable to amifostine
- Thrombomodulin
- Activated protein C
- Chelation therapy, a countermeasure for treating internal radio-isotope contamination
- DPTA, a chelation agent used to eliminate actinides that have been ingested, one of three U.S. Food and Drug Administration (FDA) radioprotectants stockpiled
- Prussian blue/radiogardase, a chelation agent to treat radio-Cesium and thallium consumption, one of three the FDA radioprotectants stockpiled
- Potassium iodide, a prophylactic drug recommended before entering radioiodine environments, one of three FDA radioprotectants stockpiled
- Kojic acid
- Hyaluronan
- Petkau effect
