= Armed Forces Radiobiology Research Institute =

Joint American military radiobiology research institution

Armed Forces Radiobiology Research Institute (AFRRI)
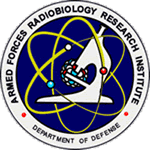

Agency overview
- Formed: May 12, 1961; 65 years ago
- Jurisdiction: Federal military research institution
- Headquarters: 4301 Jones Bridge Road, Bethesda, Maryland, US; 39°00′04.3″N 77°05′09.2″W
- Annual budget: $27.1 million (FY2014)
- Agency executive: CAPT Gerald F. Burke, Director
- Parent department: United States Department of Defense
- Parent agency: Office of the Secretary of Defense (1961-1964), Defense Atomic Support Agency (1964-1971), Defense Nuclear Agency (DASA successor, now DTRA) (1971-1993), Uniformed Services University of the Health Sciences (1993-present)
- Website: AFRRI

The Armed Forces Radiobiology Research Institute (AFRRI) is an American triservice research laboratory in Bethesda, Maryland, chartered by Congress in 1960 and formally established in 1961. It conducts research in the field of radiobiology and related matters which are essential to the operational and medical support of the U.S. Department of Defense and the U.S. Armed Forces. AFRRI provides services and performs cooperative research with other federal and civilian agencies and institutions.

== History ==
Department of Defense (DoD) interest in the health effects of exposure to radiological agents (radiobiology), born in the wake of the Manhattan Project, motivated a 1958 Bureau of Medicine and Surgery proposal that a bionuclear research facility be established to study such issues. On June 8, 1960, Public Law 86-500 authorized the construction of such a facility, including a laboratory and vivarium under the Defense Atomic Support Agency (DASA, now the Defense Threat Reduction Agency (DTRA)); on December 2, 1960, DASA and the surgeons general of the Army, Navy, and Air Force approved a charter for the Armed Forces Radiobiology Research Institute (AFFRI). The institute was formally established on May 12, 1961, by DoD Directive 5154.16 as a joint agency of the Army, Navy, and Air Force under the command and administrative control of the Office of the Secretary of Defense (OSD).

Research at AFRRI began in January 1962, although the laboratory became fully operational only in September 1963. AFFRI included a Training, Research, Isotopes, General Atomics (TRIGA) Mark F nuclear reactor (uniquely allowing studies of nuclear weapon radiation characteristics facilities), laboratory space, and an animal facility. A high-dose cobalt-60 facility, 54-megaelectron volt (54,000,000 electron volt) linear accelerator (LINAC), and low-level cobalt-60 irradiation facility were later added.

In July 1964, AFRRI was moved to DASA, and the Chief of DASA became ex officio chair of AFRRI's Board of Governors. While nominally an operational field element of DASA, AFFRI functioned largely independently. In the 1960s, the institute's research was partitioned into five departments: Experimental Pathology, Behavioral Sciences, Physical Sciences, Chemistry, and Radiation Biology; it also focused on biological responses, with an emphasis on high doses of external radiation. AFRRI conducted animal testing to determine the effects of radiation doses and opened collaborations with universities, government agencies, and corporations.

In 1971, DASA ceased to exist and AFRRI passed to its successor, the Defense Nuclear Agency (later DTRA). To address growing DOD concerns about the correlation between radiation presence and cancer in service members, AFRRI helped establish the Nuclear Test Personnel Review (NTPR) program in January 1978. NTPR-which still operates today-estimated the absorbed radiation dose of veterans who participated in U.S. atmospheric nuclear tests or the postwar occupations of Hiroshima and Nagasaki immediately after the atomic bombings and determined monetary compensation for long-term radiation-related illnesses accordingly. AFFRI's experience and expertise in nuclear accidents, hazardous materials, and radiological cleanup issues was later leveraged during AFRRI's joining of the International Chernobyl Site Restoration Assistance Team, which responded to the 1986 Chernobyl disaster. AFFRI later assisted environmental cleanup efforts Semipalatinsk Test Site in modern Kazakhstan. The late-70s saw AFRRI greatly increase its biomedical staff to address military radiation injury concerns.

The Defense Nuclear Agency transferred control of AFRRI to the Uniformed Services University of the Health Sciences (USUHS) in 1993. The end of the Cold War saw AFRRI's funding and personnel levels diminish and its termination proposed. However, the lack of alternative research institutions led to military leaders' decision to keep AFRRI operational. American interest in nuclear preparedness resurged in the late-1990s as India and Pakistan developed and tested nuclear weapons and suspicions grew that Iraq and North Korea sought to do the same. As private companies lacked the incentive to develop radioprotectants (drugs protecting against radiation damage) and countermeasures for the military, funding for AFRRI was increased in 2000.

Post-9/11 fears of terrorist threats also stimulated support for AFFRI. The attacks helped expand AFRRI's scope of work to include minimizing the effects of radiological dispersal devices (i.e. dirty bombs), terrorist access to radiation sources, and sabotage of nuclear reactors. Despite this, AFRRI remained limited by a lack of proper funding, facilities, and personnel. Extra support granted in 2003 and 2004 allowed for infrastructural upgrades and the development of a radioprotective drug, 5-androstenediol.

As of 2026, AFRRI is DOD's only medical research and development initiative dedicated to nuclear and radiological defense. It serves the military by performing medical research and development, education, and advisory and consultative functions to increase understanding of the effects and risks of ionizing radiation.

== Mission ==
AFRRI is charged with executing DoD's Medical Radiological Defense Research Program. Its civilian and active duty military personnel conduct exploratory and developmental research to identify and develop medical countermeasures against ionizing radiation. Core areas of study include prevention, assessment, and treatment of radiological injuries. The program seeks to develop prophylactic (disease preventing) and therapeutic drugs, such as Ex-Rad, that prevent and treat radiation injuries and to develop rapid high-precision analytical methods that assess radiation exposure doses from clinical samples and thus aid in the triage and medical management of radiological casualties. New drug candidates and biological dose assessment technologies are developed up to and through preclinical testing and evaluation.

Its most recent Strategic Plan (2023–2027) describes how AFRRI aligns with the National Defense Strategy.

Primary research areas of the Institute include biodosimetry, combined injury (radiation with other medical insults), internal contamination and metal toxicity, medical countermeasure development, animal welfare, assessment of radiation injury, and radiation facilities.

=== Research Mission ===
AFRRI's research focuses on its goals to:

- Develop methods of rapidly assessing radiation exposure to assure appropriate medical treatment
- Pursue new drugs that will prevent the life-threatening and health-degrading effects of ionizing radiation and move those drugs from discovery through the Food and Drug Administration approval process
- Investigate the effects of radiation injury combined with other challenges such as trauma, disease, and chemical exposures
- Contribute to the knowledge base that is useful in understanding, for example, the effects of space radiation on astronauts

=== Responsibilities ===
AFRRI is charged with the following:

- Operating research facilities for and disseminate results from the study of radiobiology and ionizing radiation bioeffects and the development of medical countermeasures against ionizing radiation
- Providing analysis, study, and consultation on the impact of the biological effects of ionizing radiation on the organizational efficiency of the U.S. military services and their members
- Conducting cooperative research with military medical departments in those aspects of military and operational and medical support considerations related to nuclear weapons effects and the radiobiological hazards of space operations
- Conducting advanced training in the field of radiobiology and the biological effects of nuclear and radiobiological weapons to meet the internal requirements of AFRRI, the military services, and other DoD components and organizations
- Participating in cooperative research and other enterprises, consistent with the AFRRI mission and applicable authorities, with other federal agencies involved in homeland security and emergency medical preparedness
- Informing and appraising department, government, academic, corporate, and other nongovernmental organizations of its (AFRRI's) activities
- Performing other such functions as may be assigned by the Assistant Secretary of Defense for Health Affairs (ASD(HA))
- Overseeing DoD's Medical Radiological Defense Research Program

== Organization ==
AFRRI is a joint entity of the three military departments and is subject to the authority and direction of the president of the Uniformed Services University of the Health Sciences (USU), Assistant Secretary of Defense for Health Affairs, and Under Secretary of Defense for Personnel and Readiness. The institute is led by a Director and Scientific Director.

=== Director ===
The director of the Armed Forces Radiobiology Research Institute is appointed by the surgeons general of the Army, Navy, and Air Force to a four-year term. Additionally, the director must hold a doctoral degree in the life sciences and be a military officer. It is the director's responsibility to act as liaison to the heads of DoD's components and other governmental and nongovernmental agencies and to ensure that other DoD components are appraised of AFRRI's activities. All directors have been captains or colonels. The current director is CAPT Gerald F. Burke as of August 2023.

Subordinate to the director are a deputy director, secretary, scientific advisor, radiation safety officer, director for administration, senior enlisted advisor, and chief of staff (overseeing a chief of finance and deputy chief of staff).

=== Scientific Director ===
AFRRI's scientific director exercises scientific leadership and the administration and supervision of the institute's research-oriented departments and the overall scientific and technical planning of the research program. He or she also serves as the scientific liaison to outside entities. There is also a scientific advisor who counsels the director and acts as a liaison with outside agencies but is not a part of the chain of command. Generally, scientific directors are civilian Ph.D.-holders.

=== Board of Governors ===
AFRRI's Board of Governors, which once meet at least once every year, comprises the following members:

- Chairman: Principal Deputy Assistant Secretary of Defense for Health Affairs (PDASD(HA))
- Executive Secretary: Director of AFRRI
- The Surgeons General of the Army, Navy, and Air Force
- The Deputy Chiefs of Staff for Operations of the Army, Navy, and Air Force
- The Joint Staff Surgeon
- The president of USUHS
- A representative of the Assistant to the Secretary of Defense for Nuclear, Chemical and Biological Defense Programs (see Assistant Secretary of Defense for Nuclear, Chemical & Biological Defense Programs)
- Any additional representatives of DoD Components or other federal agencies chosen by the Assistant Secretary of Defense for Health Affairs|ASD(HA)

=== Departments ===
As of 2014, AFRRI comprised the following departments, each headed by a department head or manager:

- Radiation Sciences
- Scientific Research
- Military Medical Operations
- Veterinary Sciences
- Facilities Management
- Good Laboratory Practice/Test Facility
- Administration Support

=== Research components ===
AFFRI subdivides its laboratory research program into four area-specific laboratories and one center discussed in length in this page's Laboratories, center, and equipment section.

=== Outreach and support education components ===
AFFRI's Military Medical Operations (MMO) Team, staffed by health physicists and radiation trained physicians, exists to apply and make useful AFRRI's research. Education outreach is provided by the Medical Effects of Ionizing Radiation (MEIR) Course and operational support by the Medical Radiobiology Advisory Team (MRAT), both available at all times to assist with radiation education or provide emergency advice.

==== Medical Effects of Ionizing Radiation (MEIR) Course ====
The MEIR Course is a post-graduate instructional course concerning the biomedical consequences of radiation exposure, how the effects can be reduced, and how to medically manage casualties. The training includes combat and noncombat and weapon and non-weapons nuclear incidents. Main focuses include health physics, biological effects of radiation, medical/health effects, and psychological effects.

MEIR Courses are three-days in length and conducted at major U.S. military bases worldwide; intended students are military medical personnel such as physicians, nurses, medical planners, and first responders.

==== Medical Radiobiology Advisory Team (MRAT) ====
MRAT provides health physics, medical, and radiobiological advice to military and civilian command and control operations worldwide in response to nuclear and radiological incidents requiring coordinated federal responses.

MRATs are deployable team responsible for providing expert advice to incident commanders and staff during radiological incident. Each MRAT is a two-person team, usually consisting of one health physicist and one physician, both specializing in the health effects of radiation, biodosimetry, and treatment of radiation casualties. Through what the AFRRI terms "reachback," deployed MRAT responders can call on the knowledge and skills of radiobiologists, biodosimetrists, and other research professionals at AFRRI and other Department of Defense response teams.

=== Other ===
AFRRI has a Radiation Biodosimetry Division. Additionally, AFRRI publishes various guidebooks and manuals regarding nuclear accident response and treatment, as well as journal articles, books, and scientific and technical reports.

== Facilities and infrastructure ==
=== Headquarters ===
Construction at AFRRI's main headquarters/facility in Bethesda, Maryland began in November 1960, preceding the organization's official charter and establishment dates. It was occupied by January 1962 and fully operational by November 1963. Facilities include a Training, Research, Isotopes, General Atomics (TRIGA) nuclear reactor, laboratory space, an animal facility. a high-dose cobalt-60 facility, a 54-megaelectron volt linear accelerator (LINAC), and a low-level cobalt-60 irradiation facility.

AFRRI's Bethesda TRIGA reactor is still operational and has a power level of 1,100 kW.

==== TRIGA NRC violation ====
An April 2019 followup investigation by the Nuclear Regulatory Commission, which oversees nuclear facilities such as those operated by AFRRI, found a Severity Level IV violation. This involved the operation of the reactor, at low power, using a new control console, without completing all necessary safety evaluations for the replaced equipment.

=== Laboratories, center, and equipment ===
AFRRI is a fully equipped research facility capable of state of the art molecular, cellular, microbiology, genetic and biochemical research. Its four laboratories and one center are:

- Cellular/Molecular Laboratory: Used for the manipulation and analysis of biological samples. Equipped with cell culture incubators, laminar flow hoods, microwaves, refrigerators, −80 °C and −20 °C freezers, micro-weight scales, pH meters, electrophoresis stations, HPLC equipment, thermo cyclers, iQ5, Experion, Millipore pure water systems, DNA synthesizers, DNA sequencers, spectrophotometers, micro-centrifuges, liquid nitrogen storage, electroporator, vacuum transfer systems, light microscopes, inverted microscopes, CO_{2} incubators, a Coulter Particle Counter, slide stainer, cytospin, luminometers, Western blot imagers, sonicators, plate readers, plate washers, chemical hoods, flammable cabinets, acid solvent cabinets, wash stations and water baths.
- Cytogenetic Laboratory: Used for cytogenetic biodosimetry analyses. Equipped with TECAN Evo 200 (robotic platform), HANABHI Harvester PII & PIII (chromosome harvesters), HANABI Spreader, Auto Stainer & Auto Image capture digital microscope, and LIMS.
- Microbiology Laboratory: Used for the manipulation of pathogenic microorganisms. Equipped with laminar flow hoods, refrigerators, CO_{2} incubators, water baths, a Vitek analyzer for bacterial identification, spectrophotometers, traditional bacterial culture equipment, and flammable cabinets.
- Instrumentation Laboratories: Equipped with an autoclave, TaqMan real-time PCR, FACScan (automated flow cytometer), FACSCalibur, luminometer, spectrophotometer, densitometer, Luminex 100 (flow cytometry analyzer) and BioRobot 8000 (automated handler for reactions or purification of DNA, RNA, and recombinant proteins).
- Biomedical Instrumentation Center: Core facility staffed with trained personnel to assist with flow cytometry, imaging and proteomics/genomics. Equipped with an EPICS ELITE ESP cell sorter, EPICS XLMCL cell analyzer, Amnis ImageStream imaging flow cytometer, LSR II, Luminex 100, and confocal, fluorescence, and electron microscopes.

== Awards, recognition, and accomplishments ==
In 2004, AFRRI was awarded the Joint Meritorious Unit Award for "exceptionally meritorious achievements" between September 11, 2001, and February 17, 2004, in response to acts of terrorism and nuclear/radiological threats worldwide.

In August 2009, the American Nuclear Society designated AFRRI a nuclear historic landmark as the U.S.'s primary source of medical nuclear and radiological research, preparedness, and training.

AFRRI has contributed significantly to the development of Amifostine, Neupogen, Neulasta, Nplate, and Leukine, a series of drugs treating or preventing radiation injuries.
