= Statera BioPharma =

American biotechnology company

Statera BioPharma, Inc.
- Formerly: Cleveland BioLabs; Cytocom
- Type: Public
- Traded as: OTC Pink: STAB
- Industry: Pharmaceuticals
- Founded: Cleveland, Ohio, 2003
- Headquarters: Fort Collins, Colorado, USA
- Key people: Yakov Kogan, CEO
- Products: Anti-radiation and oncological products
- Subsidiaries: Incuron, LLC; Panacela Labs, Inc.
- Website: www.staterabiopharma.com

Statera BioPharma, Inc. is an American clinical-stage biopharmaceutical company with a focus on novel immunotherapies.

In 2021, Cleveland BioLabs merged with Cytocom, Inc, a clinical-stage biopharmaceutical company developing novel immunotherapies targeting autoimmune, inflammatory, infectious diseases, and cancers. The new company renamed itself "Statera BioPharma".

Cleveland BioLabs Inc. had been founded in partnership with the Cleveland Clinic in 2003 and moved to the Buffalo Niagara Medical Campus in 2007. It had license agreements and collaborations with the Cleveland Clinic, Roswell Park Comprehensive Cancer Center, the Children's Cancer Institute Australia, and the Armed Forces Radiobiology Research Institute, and specialized in research and development of products with the potential to treat cancer and protect against death following acute radiation syndrome. In 2018, Cleveland BioLabs entered into a joint venture with Buffalo-based Everon Biosciences. The joint venture, Genome Protection Inc., will develop pharmaceuticals that have anti-aging applications, using Cleveland Biolabs' acute radiation exposure drug, Entolimod. Genome Protection Inc. subsequently received a $10.5 million (US) investment from Russian oligarch Roman Abramovich.

== Products ==
- Entolimod (formerly Protectan) is the company's most advanced compound. It is being developed both as a radiation countermeasure and as a cancer treatment. Entolimod is being developed and tested in two contexts: as an anti-radiation pharmaceutical, under the U.S. Food and Drug Administration's animal efficacy rule, without human testing, and as an oncological, following the approval process for human pharmaceuticals. Entolimod acts through activation of Toll-like Receptor 5 to mobilize antitumor immune response and reduce radiation effects on normal tissues.
- CBL0137 is a novel small molecule that modulates FACT (facilitates chromatin transcription). The interaction of CBL0137 with the FACT complex results in simultaneous NF-kB suppression, Heat Shock Factor 1 suppression and p53 activation. It demonstrated reproducible antitumor effects in animal models of colon, breast, renal, pancreatic, head and neck and prostate cancers, melanoma, non-small cell lung cancer, glioblastoma, lymphoma, leukemia and neuroblastoma.
- CBL0102 is a quinacrine, a compound with a long history of use in humans as a treatment for malaria, osteoarthritis and autoimmune disorders. More recently, it has been shown that CBL0102 interferes with a novel molecular target, the FACT complex, resulting in simultaneous NF-kB suppression, Heat Shock Factor 1 suppression and p53 activation. Quinacrine has shown antitumor activity in subcutaneous human xenografts of renal cell carcinoma, prostate adenocarcinoma and fibrosarcoma. Antitumor effects of CBL0102 were shown in vitro in several human tumor cell lines including melanomas, lung adenocarcinoma, mammary gland adenocarcinoma and colon carcinoma.
- CBLB612 is a proprietary compound based upon a natural activator of TLR2/TLR6 heterodimeric receptor. It structurally mimics naturally occurring lipopeptides of Mycoplasma to activate NF-kB via specific binding to TRL2, which suppresses cell death, stimulates the immune system and promotes tissue protection and regeneration. In 2009 the company assigned exclusive rights to development and marketing of CBLB612 in China to Zhejiang Hisun Pharmaceutical Co. Ltd.
- Revercom is a preclinical cancer therapy consisting of a liposome-packaged proprietary small molecule named Reversan. Reversan is a small molecule inhibitor of the multidrug transporter MRP1, which is associated with development of tumor resistance to chemotherapy.
- Mobilan is a nanoparticle-formulated, recombinant non-replicating adenovirus developed as a universal cancer therapy.
- Xenomycins are antimicrobial and antifungal agents that target basic microbial transcription and replication by binding the DNA of pathogens.

== Financials ==
The following table shows key financial figures for the company for 2011, 2012 and 2013 (parenthesis represent negative figures).

Financial measure	2013	2012	2011
Total assets	$14,700,000	$32,010,000	$32,130,000
Total liabilities	$24,220,000	$25,680,000	$23,070,000
Total equity	($9,520,000)	$6,330,000	$9,060,000
Revenue	$8,490,000	$3,570,000	$8,790,000
Total operating expense	$31,560,000	$33,620,000	$33,900,000
Net income	($17,260,000)	($18,230,000)	($4,010,000)

== Subsidiaries ==
Cleveland Biolabs had two majority-owned subsidiaries:

- Incuron, LLC is a Russian Federation-based joint venture founded in 2010 between Russian Closed Mutual Venture Fund "Bioprocess Capital Ventures" and Cleveland BioLabs to develop product candidates CBL0102 and CBL0137 for oncology indications. As of December 31, 2013, Cleveland BioLabs owned %59.2 of Incuron.
- Panacela Labs, Inc. is a joint venture company founded in 2011 by Cleveland BioLabs and Open Joint Stock Company Rusnano in conjunction with Roswell Park Cancer Institute, Children's Cancer Institute Australia and Cleveland Clinic Foundation. As of December 31, 2013, Cleveland BioLabs owned 54.6% of Panacela.
