= Medical centers in the United States =

List of major medical centers

This article discusses the major medical centers in the U.S. For all hospitals, see List of hospitals in the United States. For a general discussion about U.S. health care see Health care in the United States.

Medical centers in the United States are conglomerations of health care facilities including hospitals and research facilities that also either include or are closely affiliated with a medical school.

Although the term medical center is sometimes loosely used to refer to any concentration of health care providers including local clinics and individual hospital buildings, the term academic medical center more specifically refers to larger facilities or groups of facilities that include a full spectrum of health services, medical education, and medical research.

The major medical centers represent the premier sites of health care in the United States. They vary greatly in their organization, the services they provide, and their ownership and operation.

== Overview ==
In the United States, ownership of the health care system is mainly in private hands, though federal, state, county, and city governments also own certain facilities. Many major hospitals, generally the backbone of any medical center, are non-profit and many of these have their origins in religious organizations. Despite their non-profit status, affiliation with private ventures and major medical schools often allows them to maintain state-of-the-art facilities and services. The non-profit hospital's share of total hospital capacity has remained relatively stable (about 70%) for decades. There are also privately owned for-profit hospitals as well as government hospitals in some locations, mainly owned by county and city governments.

Major medical centers provide many specialized services, some even containing multiple specialized hospitals and clinics each dedicated to specific types of patients and/or services. Additionally, they are centers of medical education, centers of medical research, and incubators for medical innovation and technology. A given medical center may include a medical school in the same complex as the rest of the facilities or may be closely affiliated with a medical school on a nearby campus. Similarly, a given medical school may be closely associated with multiple tightly linked hospital campuses which function to some degree as a unit though the group may not be referred to as a single medical center (e.g. the Harvard Medical School network of teaching hospitals).

There are about 1,100 teaching hospitals in the United States. Approximately 375 of the larger institutions belong to the Association of American Medical Colleges’ Council of Teaching Hospitals and Health Systems (COTH). COTH teaching hospitals train about 75 percent of residents yearly and provide more than 40 percent of all hospital charity care in the nation.

== Major medical centers ==
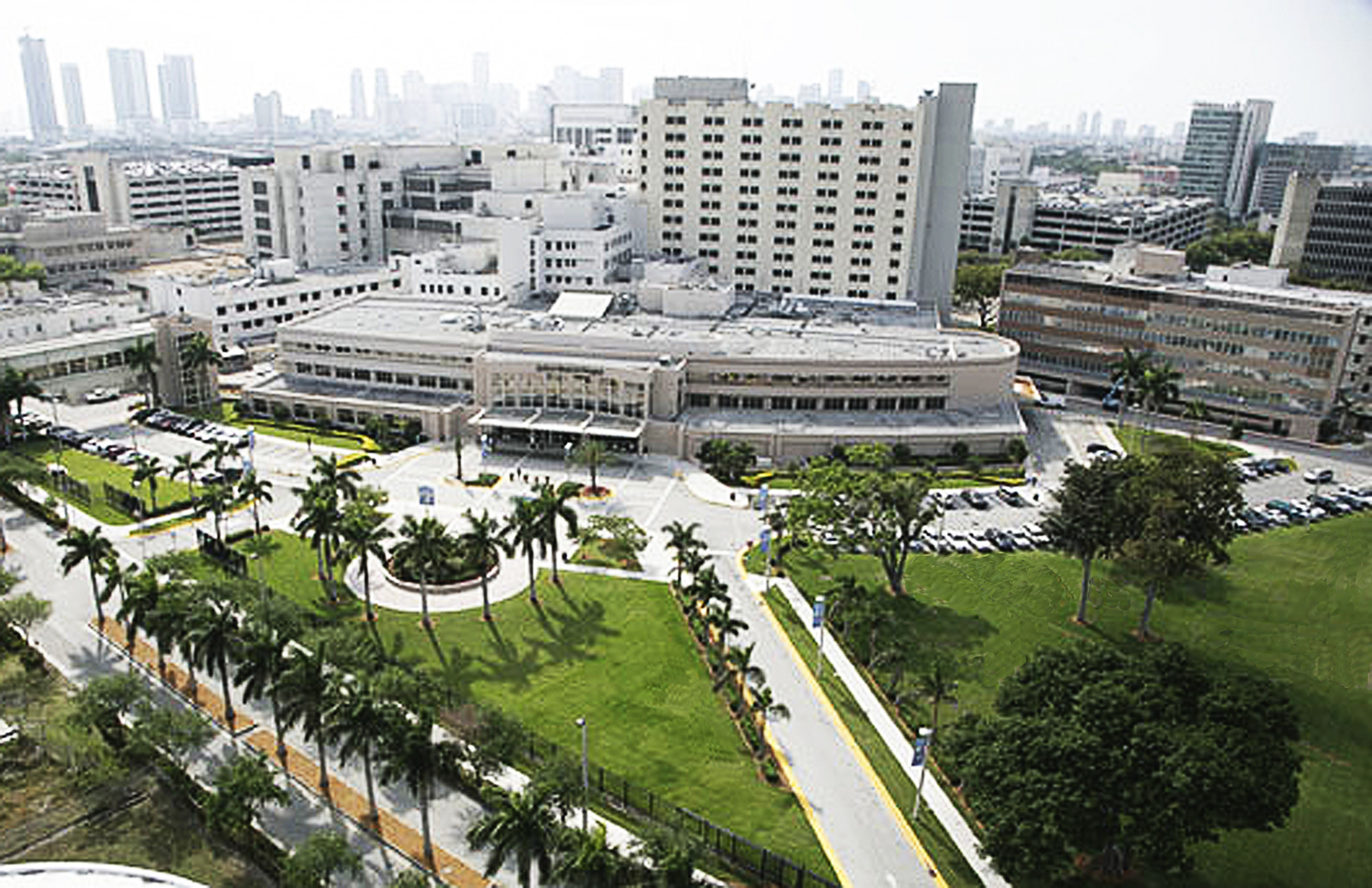
Jackson Memorial Hospital in Miami, the primary teaching hospital of the University of Miami's Miller School of Medicine and the largest hospital in the United States with 1,547 beds

Although any rankings of medical centers are highly subjective, this section describes some of the largest and most prominent centers in the nation. Note that the rankings and importance of individual hospital facilities may be different from the medical centers that they belong to.

=== Alabama ===
==== UAB Health System ====
The UAB Health System (UABHS) is a partnership between UAB and the University of Alabama Health Services Foundation (UAHSF), a private not-for-profit medical practice made up of the faculty of the UAB School of Medicine. UABHS is governed by a board of directors which has representatives of UAHSF, the University of Alabama Board of Trustees, and UAB administrators. The UAB president is the ex officio chairperson of the UAB Health System. The CEO of the UABHS reports directly to the UAB Health System board and is appointed by the chairman of the board.

UAB Hospital is the central institution of UABHS. It was formed as University Hospital in 1945 from the merger of Jefferson Hospital and Hillman Hospital, two private hospitals in the Southside of Birmingham acquired by the University of Alabama Board of Trustees. University Hospital was created to serve as the primary teaching hospital for the School of Medicine.

The other major institutions of UABHS include:

- The Kirklin Clinic of UAB Hospital, an outpatient clinic of UAB Hospital
- Callahan Eye Foundation, founded independently as the Eye Foundation Hospital in 1963 and merged into UABHS in 1973,
- UAB Medicine Women and Infants Center
- UAB Hospital-Highlands. Formerly HealthSouth's flagship medical center in the Southside, UABHS acquired it in 2006. Highlands now serves as an acute care hospital. In 2011, Highlands was merged completely into UAB Hospital.
- Spain Rehabilitation Center
- UAB Medicine Health Centers, clinics operated and staffed by UABHS located throughout central Alabama
- Viva Health, a health maintenance organization (HMO) which is a subsidiary of Triton Health Systems, a limited liability corporation based in Birmingham and owned by the UABHS

In addition UABHS manages, but does not operate, Medical West in Bessemer and Baptist Health in Montgomery. UABHS also has affiliations with the Birmingham VA Medical Center, Children's Hospital of Alabama, and Huntsville Hospital in Huntsville.

=== Arizona ===
==== Phoenix Healthcare Cluster ====
The Phoenix area is home to a large medical cluster of major hospitals, research institutes and medical centers all located within 2.5 miles of each other in Downtown Phoenix. This includes (2018 Funding from the National Institutes of Health): the internationally renowned Barrow Neurological Institute, Dignity Health St. Joseph's Hospital and Medical Center ($5.2 million), Phoenix Children's Hospital ($673,000), the Phoenix Bioscience Core campus (which includes the renowned Translational Genomics Institute ($1.0 million) and the branch of the National Institute of Diabetes and Digestive and Kidney Diseases), The University of Arizona College of Medicine - Phoenix (see above), Banner University Medical Center - Phoenix ($10.0 million), Phoenix VA Healthcare System, and a new Creighton University Health Sciences Campus that will offer 4-year medical degrees. Mayo Clinic - Phoenix, which ranked among the top 20 hospitals nationally, is located 10 miles to the northeast in North Phoenix and received $14.3 million in NIH funding in 2018. Mayo Clinic is developing the Discovery Oasis, 228 acres surrounding its 225-acre existing campus. Overall, institutions in Phoenix received $90 million in funding from the NIH to carry out research and studies.

=== California ===
==== Cedars-Sinai Medical Center ====
Cedars-Sinai Medical Center is a leading non-profit, tertiary, 886-bed hospital and multispecialty academic health science center located in Los Angeles, California. The medical center also conducts breakthrough biomedical research with currently over 500 clinical trials and 900 research projects underway.

As of 2022–23, U.S. News & World Report ranked Cedars-Sinai the best hospital in California and the western United States. It ranked as the 2nd-best hospital in the entire United States (only behind Mayo Clinic) and was placed nationally in 11 adult medical specialties and rated high performing in 10 adult procedures and conditions. Cedars-Sinai is a teaching hospital affiliate of David Geffen School of Medicine at the University of California, Los Angeles (UCLA), which was ranked #19 on the U.S. News 2022-23 Best Medical Schools: Research.

==== UCLA Medical Center ====
The Ronald Reagan UCLA Medical Center is a hospital located on the campus of the University of California, Los Angeles in Los Angeles, California. UCLA Medical Center has research centers covering nearly all major specialties of medicine as well as dentistry and ophthalmology, and is the primary teaching hospital for the David Geffen School of Medicine at UCLA. The hospital's emergency department is certified as a level I trauma center for adults and pediatrics.

In 2022–23, it was rated as the 2nd best hospital in California by the US News and the 5th best in the United States.

==== UCSF Medical Center ====
The UCSF Medical Center is a teaching hospital that also conducts biomedical research which is located in San Francisco, California. It is the 3rd-best hospital in the state of California (standing behind Cedars-Sinai Medical Center and UCLA Medical Center), and 12th best hospital in the US as per 2022-23 U.S. News & World Report ratings.

=== Colorado ===
==== Anschutz Medical Campus ====
The University of Colorado Anschutz Medical Campus is the academic health sciences campus in Aurora, Colorado that houses the University of Colorado's six health sciences-related schools and colleges, including the University of Colorado School of Medicine, the CU Skaggs School of Pharmacy and Pharmaceutical Sciences, the CU College of Nursing, the University of Colorado School of Dental Medicine, and the Colorado School of Public Health, as well as the graduate school for various fields in the biological and biomedical sciences. The campus also includes the 184-acre (0.74 km^{2}) Fitzsimons Innovation Community, UCHealth University of Colorado Hospital, Children's Hospital Colorado, the Rocky Mountain Regional Veterans Affairs hospital, and a residential/retail town center known as 21 Fitzsimons.

=== Florida ===
Lake Nona Medical City is a 650-acre (260 ha) health and life sciences park in Orlando, Florida, United States. It is located near Orlando International Airport and within the master-planned community of Lake Nona. The city is home to the University of Central Florida's Health Sciences Campus, which includes the university's College of Medicine and Burnett School of Biomedical Sciences. In the future, the campus will also house UCF's University of Central Florida College of Nursing, the University of Central Florida College of Dental Medicine, and a teaching hospital.

The medical city also includes the Sanford-Burnham Medical Research Institute, Nemours Children's Hospital, a University of Florida Academic and Research Center, and Valencia College at Lake Nona. In addition, the Orlando Veterans Administration Medical Center, began seeing clinical patients from February 2015.

=== Georgia ===
==== Emory University Medical Center ====
Emory University Hospital is a 733-bed facility in Atlanta, Georgia, specializing in the care of acutely ill adults. Emory University Hospital is staffed exclusively by Emory University School of Medicine faculty who also are members of The Emory Clinic. The hospital is renowned as one of the nation's leaders in cardiology and cardiac surgery, oncology, transplantation, ophthalmology, and the neurosciences.

The Children's Healthcare of Atlanta - Egleston Hospital is a nationally ranked, freestanding, 295-bed, pediatric acute care children's hospital located in downtown Atlanta, Georgia adjacent to Emory University. It is affiliated with the Emory University School of Medicine and is a member of the Children's Healthcare of Atlanta system, 1 of 3 of the children's hospitals in the system. The hospital provides comprehensive pediatric specialties and subspecialties to infants, children, teens, and young adults aged 0–21 throughout the Atlanta region. The hospital features an ACS verified level I pediatric trauma center, the only in the state. Its regional pediatric intensive-care unit and neonatal intensive care units serve the region. The hospital also has a rooftop helipad for critical pediatric transport.

=== Illinois ===
The Illinois Medical District is a special-use zoning district two miles west of the Loop in Chicago, Illinois. The Illinois Medical District consists of 560 acres of medical research facilities, labs, a biotechnology business incubator, a raw development area, four major hospitals, two medical universities, and more than 40 health care related facilities. The IMD has more than 29,000 employees, 50,000 daily visitors and generates $3.4 billion in economic opportunity. The Illinois Medical District is the largest medical district in North America, and has the most diverse patient population on the continent.

Four major hospitals anchor the IMD, including the Jesse Brown VA Medical Center; Rush University Medical Center; The John H. Stroger Jr., Hospital of Cook County; and The University of Illinois Hospital & Health Sciences System.

==== Streeterville neighborhood ====
- Northwestern Memorial Hospital (NMH) is a nationally ranked academic medical center located in the Streeterville neighborhood of Chicago, Illinois. It is the flagship campus for Northwestern Medicine and the primary teaching hospital for the Feinberg School of Medicine at Northwestern University. Affiliated institutions also located on campus include the Ann & Robert H. Lurie Children's Hospital with Level I pediatric trauma care and the Shirley Ryan AbilityLab, a leader in physical medicine and rehabilitation.
- Ann & Robert H. Lurie Children's Hospital of Chicago (formerly Children's Memorial Hospital) is a nationally ranked pediatric acute care teaching hospital located in Chicago, Illinois. The hospital has 360 beds and is affiliated with the Northwestern University Feinberg School of Medicine. The hospital provides comprehensive pediatric specialties and subspecialties to infants, children, teens, and young adults aged 0–21 throughout Illinois and surrounding regions. Lurie Children's also sometimes treats adults that require pediatric care. Ann & Robert H. Lurie Children's Hospital of Chicago also features a state designated Level 1 Pediatric Trauma Center, 1 of 4 in the state. The hospital has affiliations with the nearby Northwestern Memorial Hospital and adjacent to Prentice Women's Hospital. Lurie is located in the university's Streeterville campus with more than 1,665 physicians on its medical staff and 4,000 employees.
- The Shirley Ryan AbilityLab, formerly the Rehabilitation Institute of Chicago (RIC), is a nationally ranked physical medicine and rehabilitation research hospital based in Chicago, Illinois. Founded in 1954, the AbilityLab is designed for patient care, education, and research in physical medicine and rehabilitation. The AbilityLab specializes in rehabilitation for adults and children with the most severe, complex conditions ranging from traumatic brain and spinal cord injury to stroke, amputation and cancer-related impairment. Affiliated with Northwestern University, the hospital is located on the Northwestern Memorial Hospital campus and partners on research and medical efforts.
- Prentice Women's Hospital is an acute care women's hospital located adjacent to both Northwestern Memorial and the Lurie Children's Hospital. Prentice Women's Hospital is a member of Northwestern Medicine and serves as a teaching hospital for the Northwestern University Feinberg School of Medicine. The hospital provides tertiary-level obstetric, gynecological, and neonatal care to patients from the entire region. The hospital has 256 beds, with 86 AAP verified level III neonatal intensive care unit beds, 32 labor and delivery beds, 86 healthy bassinets, and 10 operating rooms. The hospital is directly attached to the Lurie Children's Hospital via skybridge because Lurie physicians provide care on Prentice's neonatal intensive care units.

=== Maryland ===
==== National Institutes of Health ====
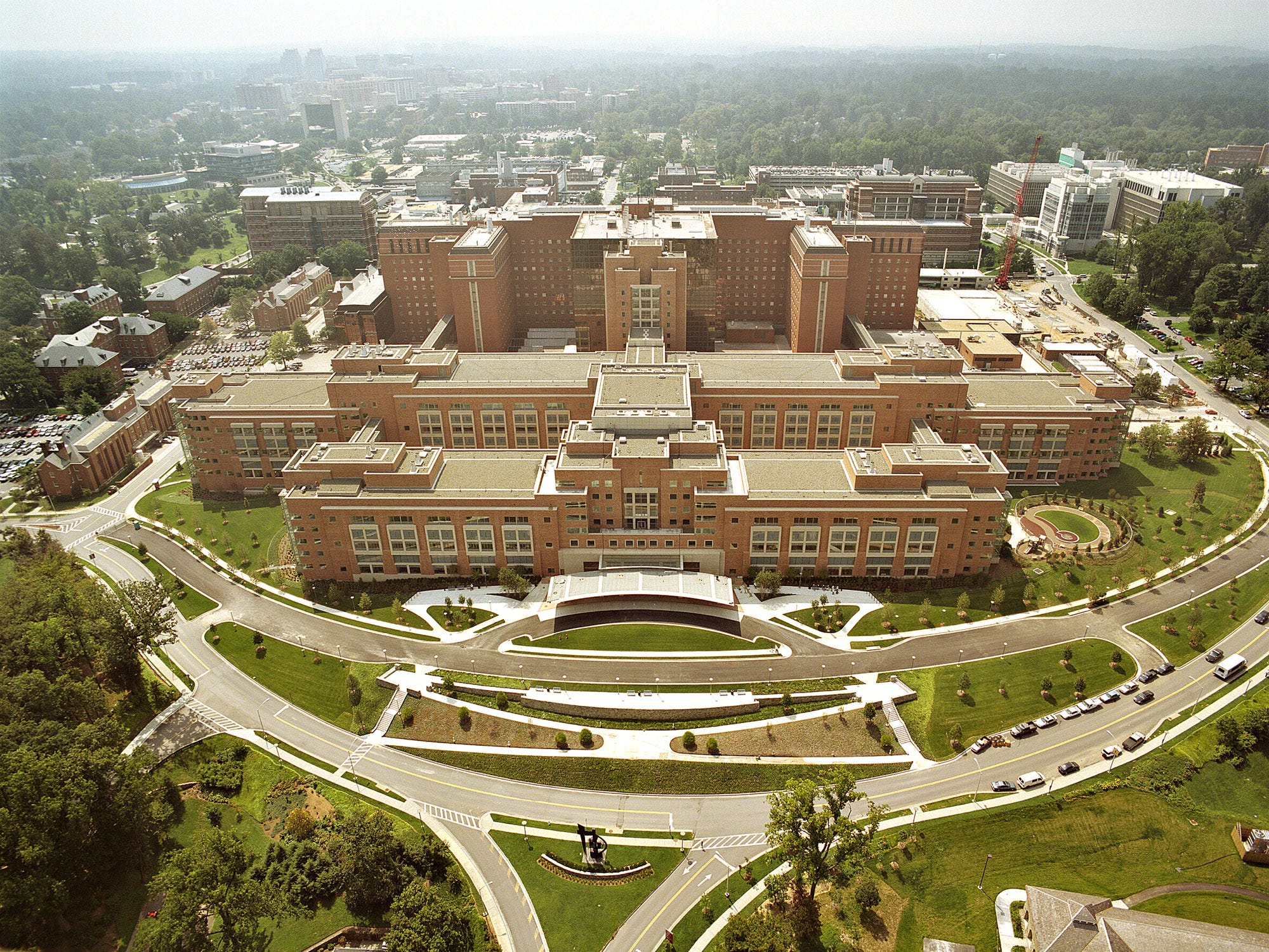
NIH Mark O. Hatfield Clinical Research Center, Bethesda, Maryland

The National Institutes of Health (NIH) are an agency of the United States Department of Health and Human Services and are the primary agency of the United States government responsible for biomedical and health-related research.

The NIH's research is divided into two parts: the Extramural Research Program is responsible for the funding of biomedical research outside the NIH, while the Intramural Research Program (IRP) is the internal research program of the NIH, known for its synergistic approach to biomedical science. Intramural research is primarily conducted at the main campus in Bethesda, Maryland, immediately adjacent to the Walter Reed National Military Medical Center and right outside Washington, D.C. The NIH campus houses the divisions of intramural research for eighteen of the twenty national institutes, including the National Institute of Allergy and Infectious Diseases, the National Cancer Institute, and the National Institute of Mental Health, as well as the National Library of Medicine, while the adjoining Walter Reed campus houses the military medical center, the Uniformed Services University of the Health Sciences, the Armed Forces Radiobiology Research Institute, the National Intrepid Center of Excellence, and the Joint Pathology Center.

==== Johns Hopkins Medicine ====
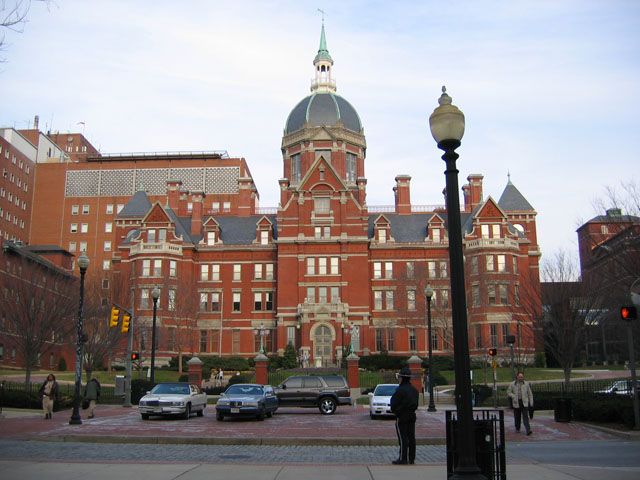
The Billings Building at Johns Hopkins Hospital in Baltimore

The Johns Hopkins University School of Medicine, located in Baltimore, Maryland (USA), in addition to operating a major medical school, operates the Johns Hopkins Hospital, which consists of both a teaching hospital and biomedical research facility. It was founded using money from a bequest by philanthropist Johns Hopkins. The Johns Hopkins Hospital and the Johns Hopkins School of Medicine are the founding institutions of modern American medicine and are the birthplace of numerous traditions including "rounds," "residents" and "housestaff".

The Johns Hopkins Hospital is the birthplace of many medical specialties including neurosurgery, urology, endocrinology, pediatrics, cardiac surgery and child psychiatry. It is widely regarded as one of the greatest hospitals in the United States and the world. It has been ranked by U.S. News & World Report as the best overall hospital in America for 20 consecutive years.

Johns Hopkins Children's Center (JHCC) is a nationally ranked, pediatric acute care children's teaching hospital located in Baltimore, Maryland, adjacent to Johns Hopkins Hospital. The hospital has 196 pediatric beds and is affiliated the Johns Hopkins School of Medicine. The hospital is the flagship pediatric member of Johns Hopkins Medicine and is 1 of 2 children's hospital in the network. The hospital provides comprehensive pediatric specialties and subspecialties to infants, children, teens, and young adults aged 0–21 throughout Baltimore and the wider United States. Johns Hopkins Children's Center also sometimes treats adults that require pediatric care. Johns Hopkins Children's Center also features one of the only ACS verified Level 1 Pediatric Trauma Centers in the state. The hospital is directly attached to Johns Hopkins Hospital and is situated near the Ronald McDonald House of Maryland.

=== Massachusetts ===
==== Boston Longwood Area ====
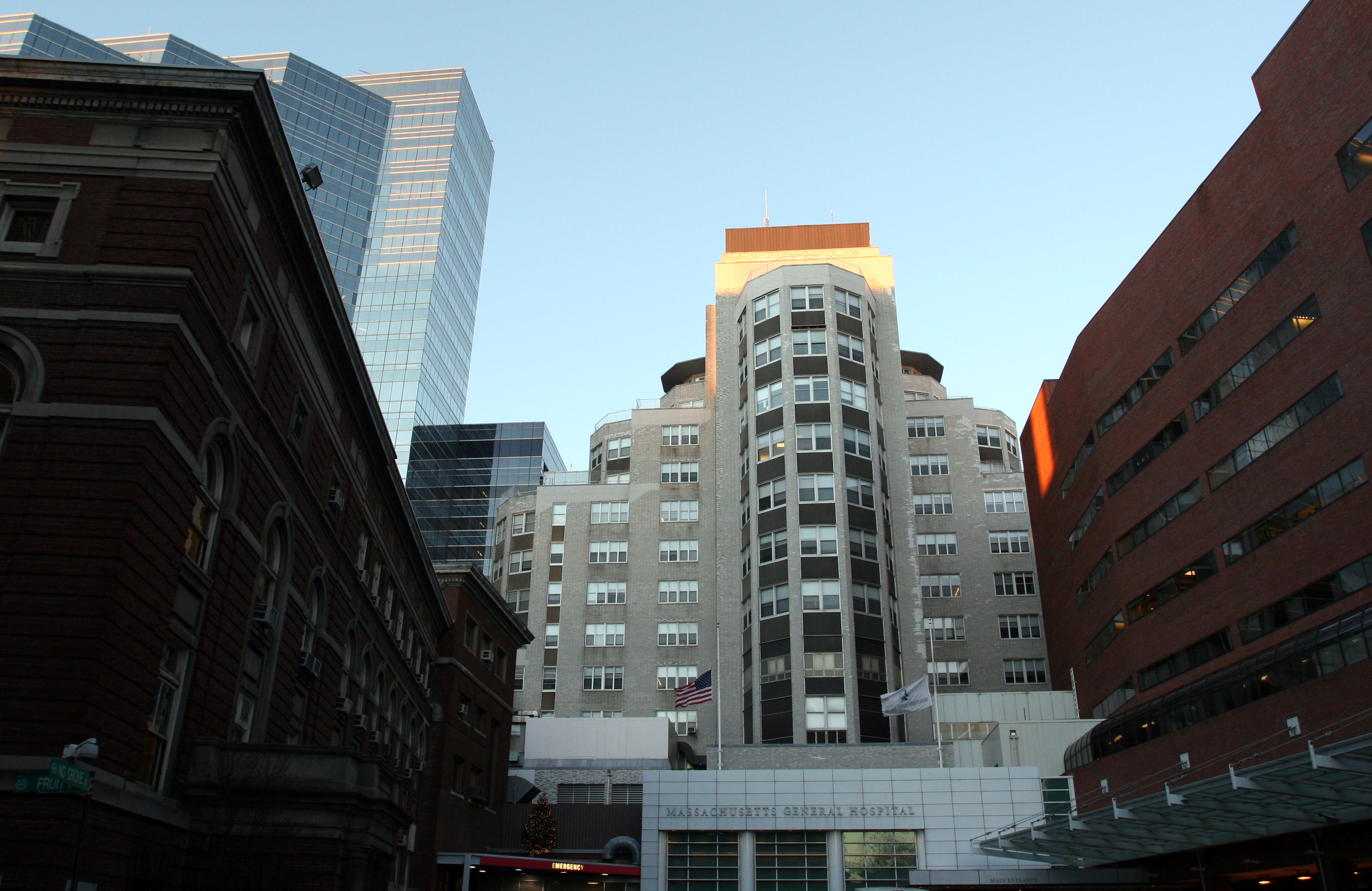
Main entrance of Massachusetts General Hospital

The major facilities in Boston's Longwood area are:

- Beth Israel Deaconess Medical Center
- Boston Children's Hospital
- Brigham and Women's Hospital
- Dana–Farber Cancer Institute
- Joslin Diabetes Center
- Massachusetts Mental Health Center
- Wyss Institute for Biologically Inspired Engineering

Massachusetts General Hospital (also known as Mass General or MGH) and Harvard Medical School in Boston, Massachusetts, collectively represent one of the oldest medical education and research centers in the nation. Massachusetts General itself is owned and operated by Partners HealthCare (which also owns Brigham and Women's Hospital, Salem Hospital and Newton Wellesley Hospital among others. MGH is part of the consortium of hospitals which operates Boston MedFlight and is a member of the Dana-Farber/Harvard Cancer Center. Mass General is also the primary teaching hospital for Harvard Medical School.

The hospital has 1,051 beds and admits over 45,000 patients each year. The surgical staff performs over 34,000 operations yearly and hospital handles over 1 million outpatients each year at its main campus, as well as its six satellite facilities in Boston at Back Bay, Charlestown, Chelsea, Everett, Revere, and Waltham. In 2003, MGH was named the state's first Magnet hospital by the American Nurses Credentialing Center, a subsidiary of the American Nurses Association. As of 2020–21, MGH was ranked the #6 hospital in the United States by U.S. News & World Report.

=== Michigan ===
==== University of Michigan Medical Center ====
Michigan Medicine, formerly the University of Michigan Health System (UMHS), is the wholly owned academic medical center of the University of Michigan, in Ann Arbor. It includes the U-M Medical School, with its faculty group practice and many research laboratories; the U-M hospitals and health centers, which include the University of Michigan Hospital, C.S. Mott Children's Hospital, Von Voigtlander Women's Hospital, as well as approximately 40 health centers and home care services across southeast Michigan; the clinical programs of the U-M School of Nursing; and the activities of the Michigan Health Corporation, through which U-M partners with other medical centers and hospitals to provide specialized care throughout Michigan.

C.S. Mott Children's Hospital is a pediatric acute care hospital located in Ann Arbor, Michigan. The hospital has 244 pediatric beds and is affiliated with the University of Michigan Medical School. The hospital provides comprehensive pediatric specialties and subspecialties to infants, children, teens, and young adults 0-21 throughout Michigan and the surrounding states. The hospital sometimes also treats older adults that require pediatric care. C.S. Mott Children's Hospital also features a Level 1 Pediatric Trauma Center, 1 of 3 in the state. Attached to the children's hospital is the Von Voigtlander Women's Hospital that provides maternal and gynecological care for women.

=== Minnesota ===
==== Mayo Clinic ====
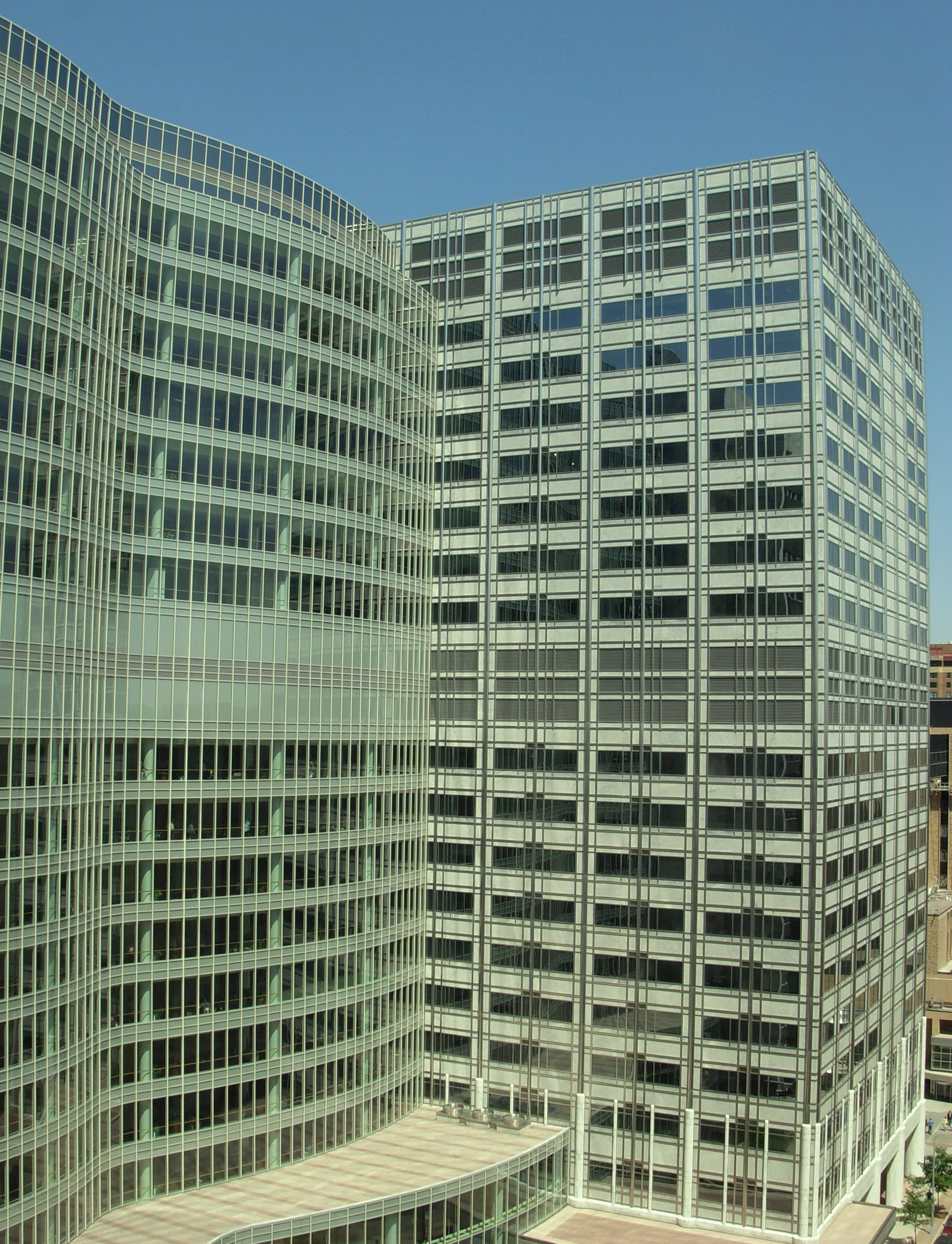
The Gonda Building, one of the many Mayo Clinic buildings at the main campus in Rochester

Mayo Clinic is a nonprofit organization and internationally renowned group medical practice headquartered in Rochester, Minnesota. Its College of Medicine and Science includes the Mayo Clinic Alix School of Medicine, the Mayo Clinic Graduate School of Biomedical Sciences, and the Mayo Clinic School of Graduate Medical Education. It has clinical, research, and educational facilities in Rochester, Minnesota, in addition to Scottsdale and Phoenix, Arizona, and Jacksonville, Florida. Mayo Clinic partners with a number of smaller clinics and hospitals in Minnesota, Iowa, and Wisconsin, an organization known as the Mayo Clinic Health System.

Mayo Clinic pays medical doctors a fixed salary that is unaffected by patient volume. This practice is thought to decrease the monetary motivation to see patients in large numbers and increase the incentive to spend more time with individuals. Salaries are determined instead by the marketplace salaries for physicians in comparable large group practices.

The Mayo Clinic campuses in Rochester form the largest integrated medical center in the world.

=== Missouri ===
==== Washington University Medical Center ====
Covering 164 acres over 17 city blocks, the medical campus is positioned at the intersection of St. Louis's Central West End and Forest Park Southeast. In addition to the Washington University School of Medicine, Washington University Medical Campus includes Barnes-Jewish Hospital, St. Louis Children's Hospital, St. Louis College of Pharmacy and the Alvin J. Siteman Cancer Center among other major facilities.

The medical campus generates an annual economic impact of nearly $6.3 billion for the St. Louis region with over 21,000 employees, the combined medical campus institutions are among the largest employers in the St. Louis metropolitan area.

=== New York ===
==== NewYork-Presbyterian Hospital ====
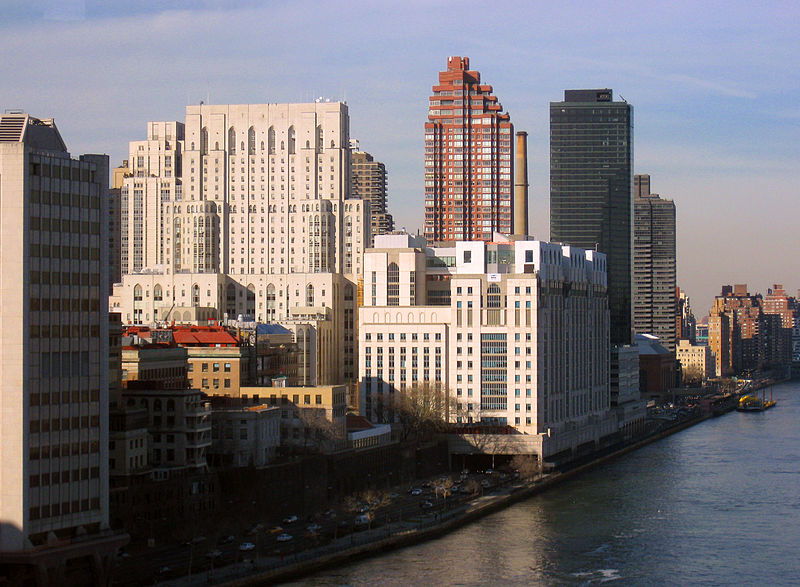
NewYork-Presbyterian Hospital / Weill Cornell campus.

NewYork-Presbyterian Hospital is a prominent university hospital system in New York City, composed of two medical centers, Columbia University Medical Center and the Cornell University Weill Medical Center.

New York-Presbyterian Hospital, chartered as "The New York and Presbyterian Hospital" by New York State in 1996, was formed in 1998 with the merger of two large, previously independent hospitals, the New York Hospital and Presbyterian Hospital. The NYPH system includes a variety of outlying hospitals that had previously been acquired by NYH or Presbyterian; these hospitals stretch throughout the five boroughs, Westchester County, Long Island and New Jersey. NYPH is now the largest private employer in New York City.

The two medical schools remain essentially autonomous, though there is increasing cooperation and coordination of clinical, research, and residency training programs. NewYork-Presbyterian Hospital is one of the most comprehensive university hospitals in the world, with leading specialists in every field of medicine.

==== NYU Langone Health ====
NYU Langone Medical Center is an academic medical center located in New York City, New York, United States, affiliated with New York University. The Medical Center comprises the NYU School of Medicine and several hospitals: Tisch Hospital, the Rusk Institute of Rehabilitation Medicine, the Hospital for Joint Diseases, NYU Langone Hospital—Brooklyn, NYU Winthrop Hospital, and most recently, Hassenfeld Children's Hospital. NYU Langone Medical Center also operates over thirty ambulatory facilities in Manhattan, Brooklyn, Queens and Long Island. In early 2016, NYU Langone had approximately 25,000 employees, and over 8,000 more employees were gained after the acquisition of Long Island's Winthrop-University Hospital. The main campus of NYU Langone Medical Center overlooks the East River.

Hassenfeld Children's Hospital (HCH) at NYU Langone (formerly Children's Health at NYU Hospitals Center) is a pediatric acute-care children's hospital located on the NYU Medical Center campus in Manhattan, New York. Hassenfeld Children's Hospital has 102 pediatric beds and is located in the Helen L. and Martin S. Kimmel Pavilion. It is directly affiliated with the pediatrics department of the New York University Grossman School of Medicine. The hospital treats infants, children, teens, and young adults aged 0–21, with some programs treating up until age 25. While not a trauma center, Hassenfeld Children's Hospital contains the KiDS Emergency Department to treat children with injuries.

==== University of Rochester Medical Center ====
The University of Rochester Medical Center (URMC), now known as UR Medicine, is located in Rochester, New York, is one of the main campuses of the University of Rochester and comprises the university's primary medical education, research and patient care facilities.

URMC is one of the largest facilities for medical treatment and research in Upstate New York and includes a regional Prenatal Center, Trauma Center, Burn Center, James P. Wilmot Cancer Center, an Epilepsy Center, Psychiatric/Behavioral Health Emergency and treatment departments, Liver Transplant Center and Cardiac Transplant Center and also includes a major AIDS Treatment Center and an NIH-designated AIDS Vaccine Evaluation Unit. A large portion of the university's biomedical research is conducted in the Arthur Kornberg Medical Research Building and the Aab Institute of Biomedical Sciences.

In January 2008, the University of Rochester announced a $500 million strategic plan geared toward expansion in research and patient services. The plan anticipated adding 1,800 new jobs to the university, building a 123-bed addition to the hospital, a building for clinical and translational sciences, and a new ambulatory surgery center.

The flagship hospital of the medical system is Strong Memorial Hospital.

==== Upstate University Hospital ====
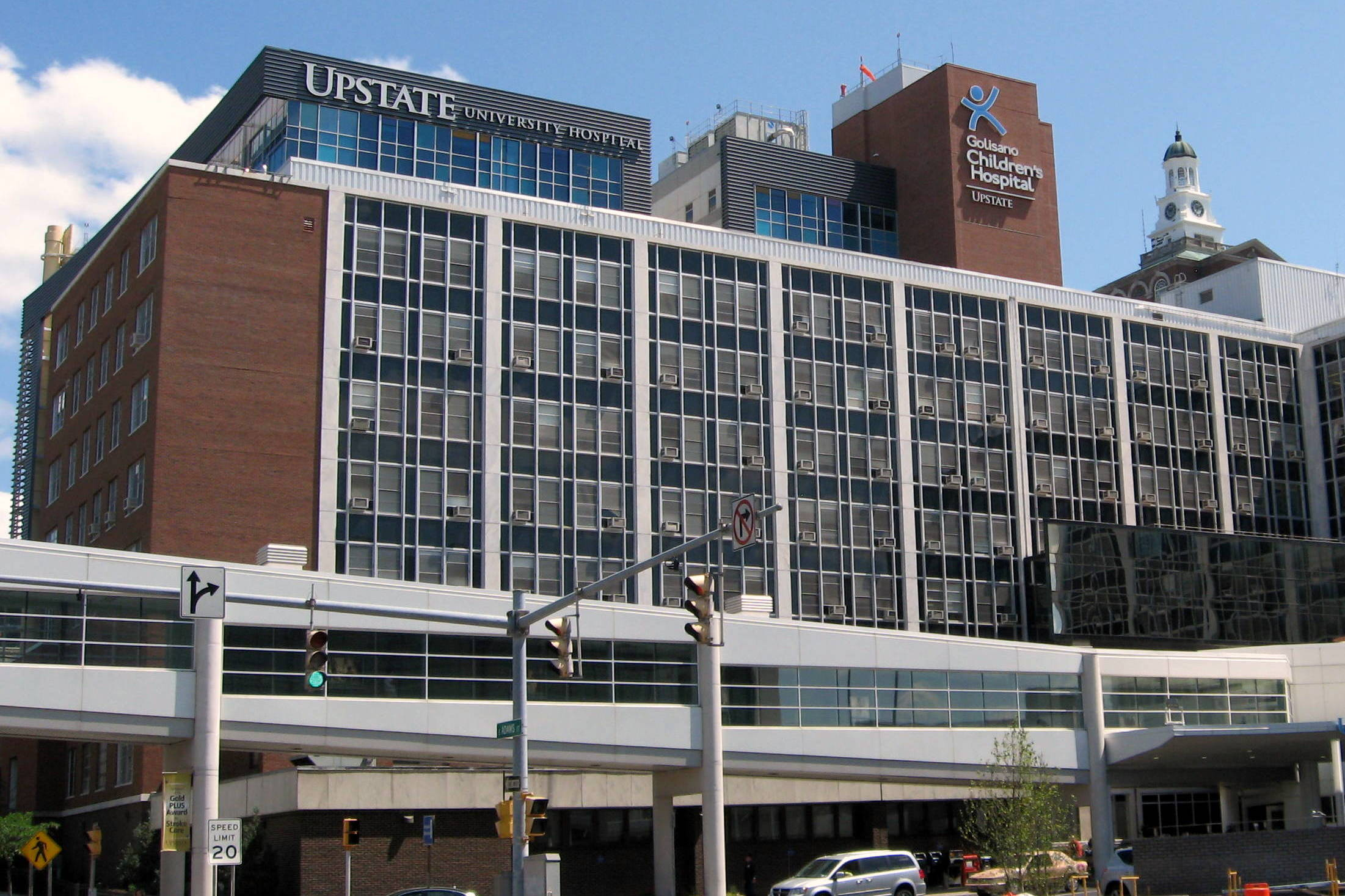
Upstate University Hospital, main teaching arm of the Norton College of Medicine at SUNY Upstate Syracuse, NY.

Upstate University Hospital is an academic medical center affiliated with the Norton College of Medicine at the State University of New York Upstate Medical University located in Syracuse, New York. The hospital, a part of the Upstate Health System, is a 752-bed non-profit and the flagship hospital in the system. The hospital is an American College of Surgeons verified Level 1 Trauma Center, the only in the Central New York region and one of 21 in New York. Attached to the hospital is the Upstate Golisano Children's Hospital that treats infants, children, teens, and young adults aged 0–21. The Upstate University Health System has been honored with numerous designations and awards for excellence in medicine, research and nursing by the National Institute of Health, New York State Department of Health, American College of Surgeons, American Heart Association, American Nurses Association, U.S. News & World Report, Forbes, etc.

There are seven clinical departments that offer surgery at Upstate University Hospital. Collectively, the hospital offers more surgeons, robotic instrumentation and specialty procedures than any other facility in Central New York, with the Department of Surgery providing the largest component. In addition, the past decade has seen the expansion of cancer surgical specialties at Upstate. The surgeons who treat cancer see patients through the Upstate Cancer Center, a newer facility which provides disease-specific, multidisciplinary care to patients with different types of cancer.

=== North Carolina ===
==== Duke University Health System ====
Duke University Health System (also known as Duke Health) combines the Duke University School of Medicine, the Duke University School of Nursing, the Duke Clinic, and the member hospitals into a system of research, clinical care, and education. Hospitals include the Duke University Hospital, Duke Children's Hospital and Health Center, Duke Regional Hospital, and Duke Raleigh Hospital. Duke University Hospital is a 957-acute care bed academic tertiary care facility located in Durham, North Carolina. Established in 1930, it is the flagship teaching hospital for the Duke University Health System, a network of physicians and hospitals serving Durham County and Wake County, North Carolina, and surrounding areas, as well as one of three Level I referral centers for the Research Triangle of North Carolina (the other two are UNC Hospitals in nearby Chapel Hill and WakeMed Raleigh in Raleigh).

==== UNC Health Care ====
UNC Medical Center (UNCMC) is a 905-bed non-profit, public, research and academic medical center located in Chapel Hill, North Carolina, providing tertiary care for the Research Triangle, surrounding areas and North Carolina. The medical center is a part of the UNC Health Care Health System and is made up of four hospitals that include the North Carolina Memorial Hospital, North Carolina Children's Hospital, North Carolina Neurosciences Hospital, North Carolina Women's Hospital, and the North Carolina Cancer Hospital. UNCMC is affiliated with the University of North Carolina School of Medicine. UNCMC features an ACS designated adult and pediatric Level 1 Trauma Center and has a helipad to handle medevac patients.

North Carolina Children's Hospital (NCCH) is a pediatric acute care hospital located within UNC Medical Center in Chapel Hill, North Carolina. The hospital has 158 beds. It is affiliated with The University of North Carolina School of Medicine, and is a member of UNC Health. The hospital provides comprehensive pediatric specialties and subspecialties to infants, children, teens, and young adults aged 0–21 throughout North Carolina. North Carolina Children's Hospital features the only pediatric Level 1 Trauma Center in the region, and 1 of 3 in the state.

=== Ohio ===
==== Cleveland Clinic ====
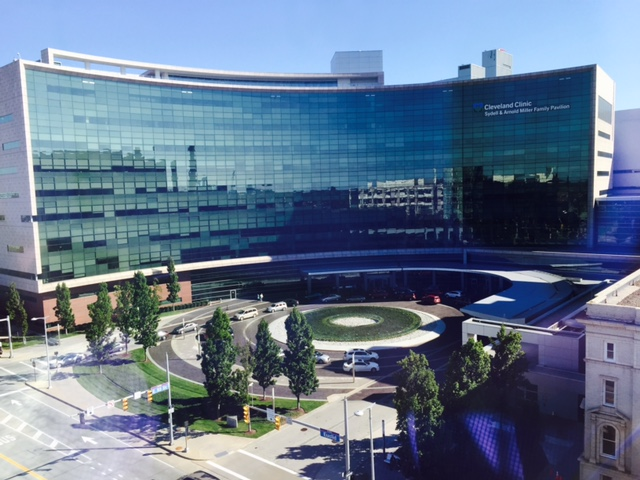
Cleveland Clinic Miller Family Pavilion

The Cleveland Clinic is a multispecialty academic medical center based in Cleveland, Ohio, although it has other locations. Currently regarded as one of the top hospitals in the United States, the Cleveland Clinic was established in 1921 by four physicians for the purpose of providing patient care, research, and medical education in an ideal medical setting. One of the largest private medical centers in the world, the Cleveland Clinic saw more than 2,800,000 patient visits in 2005, with almost 70,000 hospital admissions. Patients arrive at the Cleveland Clinic from all 50 states and more than 100 nations. The Cleveland Clinic's approximately 1,700 salaried staff physicians represent 120 medical specialties and subspecialties and is ranked among the top four hospitals in America. The Cleveland Clinic has ranked number one in America for cardiac care for 15 years in a row.

==== Ohio State University Wexner Medical Center ====
The Ohio State University Wexner Medical Center is a multidisciplinary academic medical center located in Columbus, Ohio, United States, on the main campus of The Ohio State University. In 2012, the Ohio State Medical Center changed its name to The Ohio State University Wexner Medical Center in honor of Ohio State alumnus and The Limited founder Les Wexner. For 26 consecutive years, U.S. News & World Report has recognized Ohio State Wexner Medical Center specialties in its "Best Hospitals" rankings.

=== Pennsylvania ===
Jefferson Health System

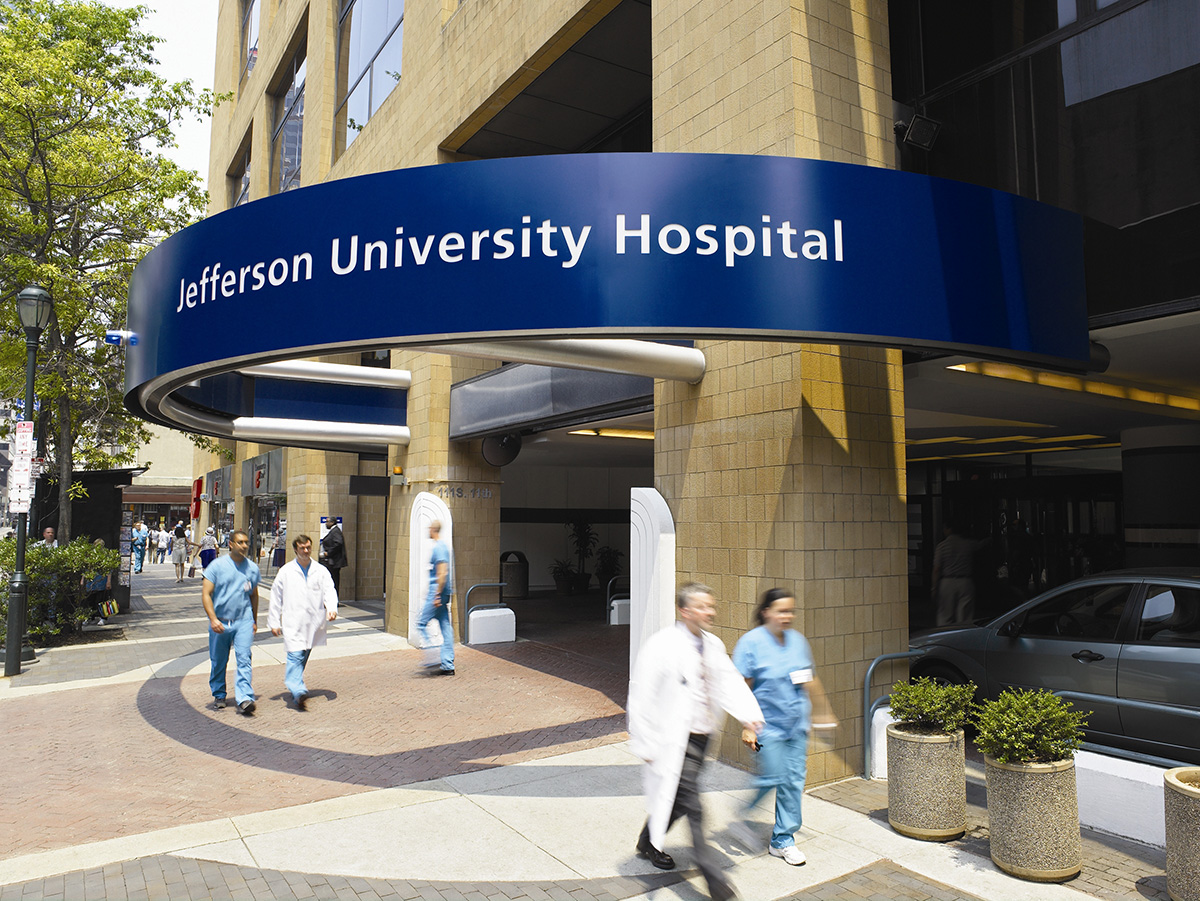
Entrance to Thomas Jefferson University Hospital on South 11th Street

Jefferson Health, is a multi-state non-profit health system whose flagship hospital is Thomas Jefferson University Hospital in Center City, Philadelphia. The health system's hospitals serve as the teaching hospitals of Thomas Jefferson University. Thomas Jefferson University and Jefferson Health are integrated together as two arms of the same organization. It has a single board of directors and produces joint financial statements. The CEO of Thomas Jefferson University and Jefferson Health is Joseph G. Cacchione, MD.

==== University of Pennsylvania Health System ====
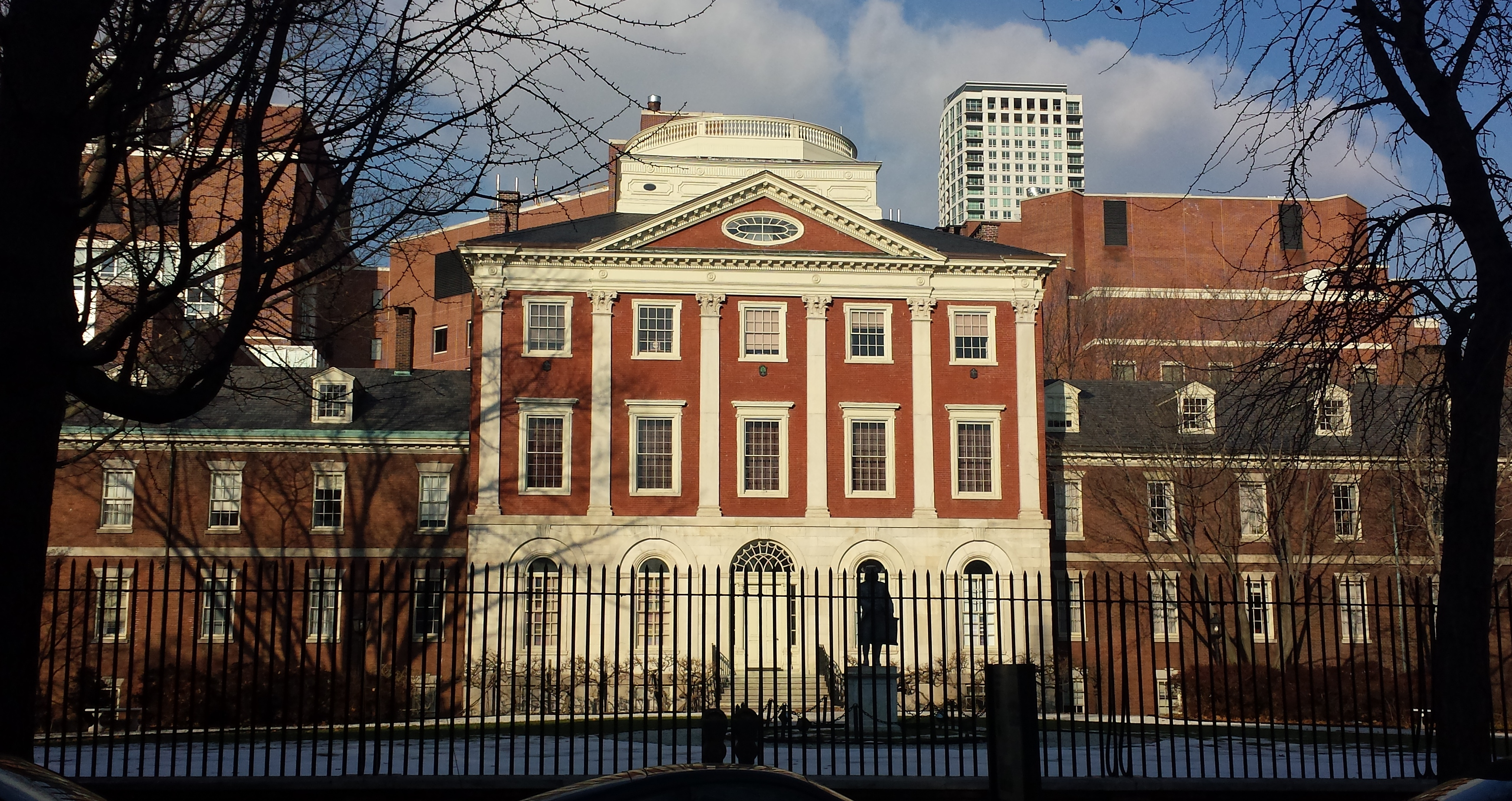
The original building of Pennsylvania Hospital, as seen from Pine Street in Philadelphia.

University of Pennsylvania Health System includes the nation's first teaching hospital, Hospital of the University of Pennsylvania (HUP), and the nation's first hospital, Pennsylvania Hospital. It operates under the direction and auspices of Penn Medicine in Philadelphia, Pennsylvania. HUP alone is ranked as the 9th-best overall hospital in the United States by U.S. News & World Report in 2010. Although it is not a part of Penn Health System, the Children's Hospital of Philadelphia(CHOP) is also on the same campus and it engages in many collaborative efforts. CHOP's physicians serve as the pediatrics department of Penn's School of Medicine.

==== University of Pittsburgh Medical Center ====
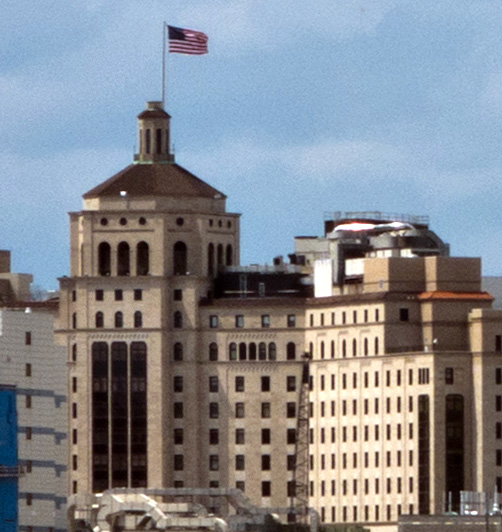
UPMC's flagship facility, Presbyterian University Hospital, located in the Oakland neighborhood of Pittsburgh adjacent to University of Pittsburgh's main campus

The University of Pittsburgh Medical Center (UPMC) is headquartered in Pittsburgh, Pennsylvania, and is closely affiliated with its academic partner, the University of Pittsburgh, which ranks third in the nation in the number of total NIH-sponsored research awards and fifth for the total dollar amount of NIH-sponsored funding. UPMC is one of the largest medical center systems in the world with more than 35 hospitals, 8,000 licensed beds, and 600 outpatient sites in Pennsylvania, Ohio, and New York, as well as locations overseas. Appearing on U.S. News & World Report's honor roll of the top hospitals for over 15 years, it was the site of the creation of the first polio vaccine by Jonas Salk, helped to develop emergency medicine under Peter Safar, and pioneered organ transplantation under the direction of Thomas Starzl, at one time boasting the largest and busiest organ transplantation program in the world. A fully integrated health care system that includes its own health insurance and commercial services divisions, UPMC has exported its clinical and administrative expertise and technologies around the world, including the ISMETT organ transplantation center in Sicily, a hospital and cancer centers in Ireland, and partnerships in China, Colombia, Italy, Japan, Kazakhstan, Lithuania, Singapore, and the United Kingdom.

=== Texas ===
==== Texas Medical Center ====
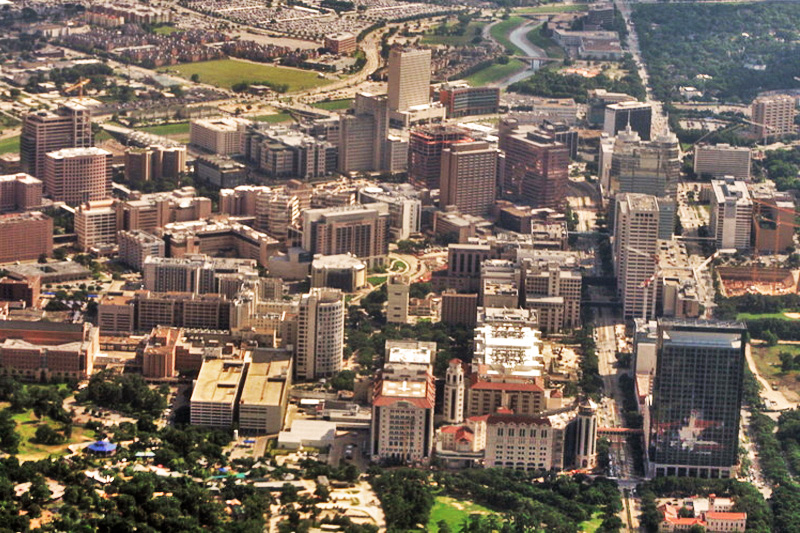
An aerial view of Texas Medical Center in Houston

The Texas Medical Center is the largest medical center in the world with one of the highest densities of clinical facilities for patient care, basic science, and translational research. Located in Houston, the center contains 50 medicine-related institutions, including 21 hospitals and two specialty institutions, two medical schools, six nursing schools, and schools of dentistry, public health, pharmacy, and other health-related practices. All 50 institutions are not-for-profit and constitute some of the most highly regarded institutions in the country, including: M.D. Anderson Cancer Center, Texas Children's Hospital, The Texas Heart Institute, The Methodist Hospital and Baylor College of Medicine. The center is where one of the first and largest air ambulance services was created and where a successful inter-institutional transplant program was developed. More heart surgeries are performed at the Texas Medical Center than anywhere else in the world.

==== Southwestern Medical District ====
The Southwestern Medical District is a prominent medical center in Dallas, Texas, which is anchored around the University of Texas Southwestern Medical Center as its main academic center, and is surrounded by the following institutions:

- Parkland Memorial Hospital
- Children's Medical Center Dallas
- William P. Clements Jr. University Hospital
- Zale Lipshy Pavilion – William P. Clements Jr. University Hospital
- Dallas Veteran Affairs Medical Center
- Texas Health Presbyterian Hospital Dallas
- Southlake General Surgery

== Criticism ==
Large academic medical centers have been criticized for their exorbitant cost. PwC has noted how "AMCs can do a lot of complex work, but 90 percent of patients are people who need to quit smoking, eat better, improve their literacy and find a better-paying job."

== See also ==
- Health care in the United States
- Academic health science centre – Medical school affiliated with a teaching hospital
