= Naval Support Activity Bethesda =

Naval Support Activity Bethesda — NSA Bethesda, NSAB, or simply Bethesda — is a military base of the United States Navy located in Bethesda, Maryland. NSA Bethesda is responsible for base operational support for its major tenant, Walter Reed National Military Medical Center.

Other organizations hosted by NSA Bethesda include:

- Armed Forces Radiobiology Research Institute
- National Intrepid Center of Excellence
- Uniformed Services University of the Health Sciences
- five Fisher Houses
