= Short time duty =

The short time duty (or short time operation) indicates an operating mode of increased performance but for a shorter length of time. Commonly it is also referred to the maximum load (the performance) at which and the related maximum length of time a device can be operated without to failure.

== Device applications ==
The load can be a maximum power, temperature, revolution speed, torque, acceleration or whatever can influence the mechanical or chemical properties of the device for its correct function: for instance an electrical motor can be driven at a higher revolution speed than for normal (constant) operation (nominal revolution speed), but after a short time it should be driven down or switched out in order to prevent from damage; another example can be the operating temperature of a simple oven which can be raised to the maximum allowed but only for a short time to avoid that the oven begins to burn. Generally at all performances a part of the input energy will be dissipated as heat. The higher the operation power the higher the heat to dissipate. If the performance is too high, the device will not be able to dissipate the heat to its environment and its temperature will raise proportionally to the energy surplus. If the temperature raises too much the mechanical and chemical properties of the device will begin to change causing permanent deformations for plastical material or fractures for brittle materials. Being the energy the product of power and time, either the power (or any to it related physical value) as by normal operation/duty or the time as by short-time duty have to be limited.

short time duty by multimeters: here the maximum time for high currents (up to 10 Ampere) is 10 seconds

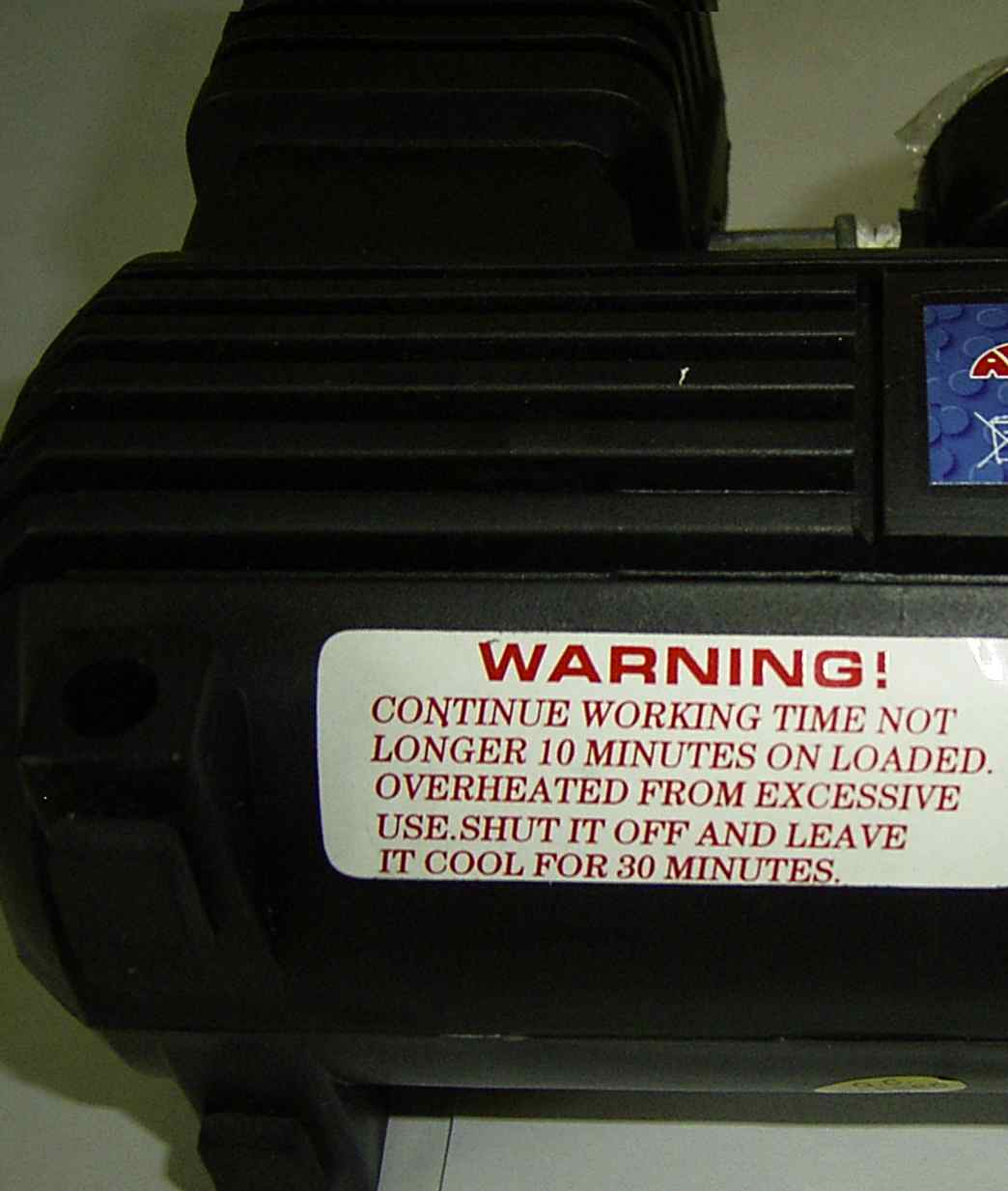
short time duty by air compressors

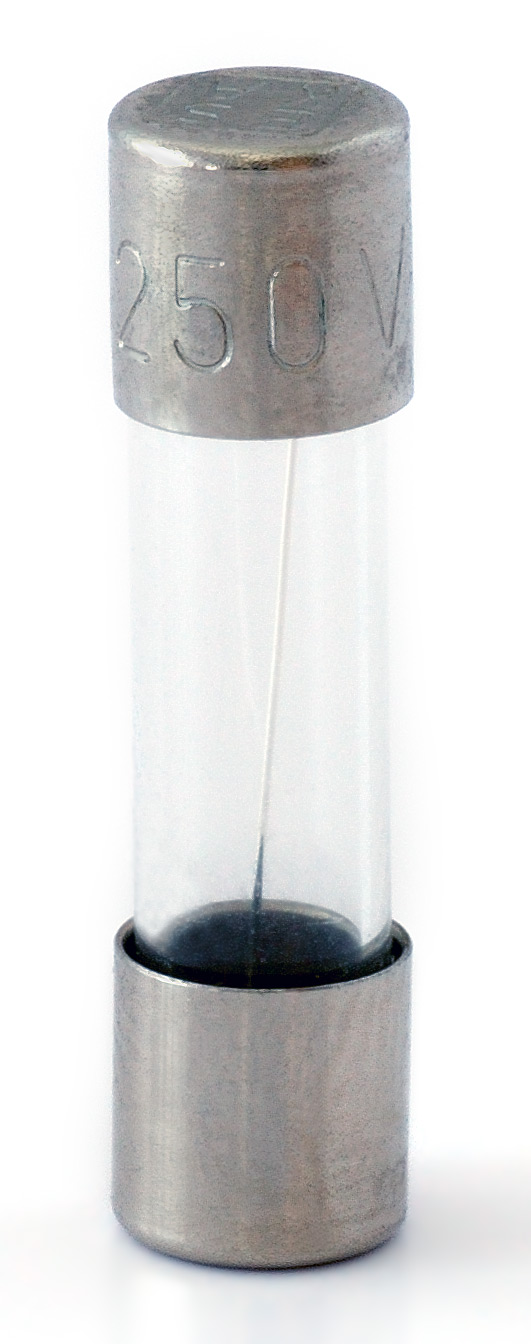
fusible

A common application is the high current measure (typically up to 10 or 20 A) with multimeters. The maximum time length of short time duty (typically 10 to 30 seconds) is indicated near the corresponding socket (usually the left one) as well as the time to be waited for, before each of such measures might be repeated (typically "each 15 minutes"). Another common application is inflation with air compressors: those become very hot, if used for a too long time and have to be shut down after a certain time (for small compressors such that of the picture a typical time is 10 minutes).

=== Protection ===
Only in some cases there is a built-in device protection in form for instance of a fusible in electrical devices (for instance in a halogen lamp to prevent damage from use of too high power bulbs) or in form for instance of a pressure relief valve in hydraulic devices (e.g. a pressure cooker); many others have no protection (most hair-dryers) and the user realizes that the duty short time is over after for example the overheating has already damaged the device.

=== Standardisation ===
Many producers indicates this short time duty only in the instruction handbook of the device, other indicates it on the very device. At this time (2007) there is no international identifier for this property. In Germany for instance it is indicated with KB (Kurzzeitbetrieb = shor time operating/operation) and the time in minutes, in France there is no abbreviation but it is referred to as service temporaire, in Spanish it is indicated with servicio temporal, in Italian with servizio di durata limitata, and so on.

== Human applications ==
The concept of short time duty is easy to understand when referred to human beings in medical applications both somatic (body) as well as psychological (mind). The analogy with devices is useful to better understand both type of applications and should not be underestimated as if human beings were much better than their machines or devices: in this case a short time duty prevents from diseases.

The best example is the radiation exposure (X-rays, gamma-radiation or particle radiation) for which a maximum short-time-, as well as a cumulative year-, and a life-dose are well defined for every type of radiation in order to avoid cancer (e.g. maximum number of dental X-rays per year). In this case the maximum load of the definition is represented by the dose (see also Radiation Safety). A controversial field is the uses of mobile (cellular) phones, for which there are no proven damages.

Another simple example of well defined short time duty are the exposure times of sunscreen lotions (in this the case the load is also the electromagnetic radiation dose but its energy is just weaker and its frequency is shorter, i.e. ultra-violet light UV).
A last good example are allergies: in this case the load is the concentration of the allergic substance and the short time duty is depending on many factors like age, genetics, medical condition and so on.

Besides this somatic examples many everyday situations can influence the correct operating of human beings: a stressing situation (an annoying noise or even mobbing at work) can be tolerated for a certain short time "duty" (some seconds or days depending on its impact and on patience), but thereafter it can make irritable or bear to a serious depression.

=== Protection ===
The human body has also some built-in protections but only to a moderate extent (there is no fusible which can be simply exchanged in case of overload). The best protection for human beings is on the one side health education, which is equivalent to a handbook of its own body (body side), and love, friendship and politeness in case of human relations (mind side).

=== Standardisation ===
All human beings have a similar resistance to most biological agents and exposures with some exceptions (e.g. UV-rays short time duty or allergies) but the human gene sequences are remarkably homogeneous, so that there is a quite good standardisation and all human beings recognize their similars as such and automatically know which short time duties they can withstand.
Only by psychological aspects the short time duty is very different from human being to human being depending on their culture and religion (to sneeze in a far east country will rapidly irritate the companionship while just causing commiseration in a west country).
