= Solvent (disambiguation) =

A solvent is a liquid that dissolves another material.

Solvent may also refer to:

- Solvent (producer), the stage name of electronic musician Jason Amm
- Solvent (film), a 2024 horror film by Johannes Grenzfurthner
- Solvency, a company's capability to meet its financial obligations
- "Solvent", a song on the 1984 Skinny Puppy album Remission
- "Solvent", a song on the 2013 Skinny Puppy album Weapon
- "Solvent" (Doctors), a 2003 television episode

== See also ==
- Solvation
- Solvent cabinet
- Solvent exposure
- Solvent extraction
