= Entolimod =

Chemical compound

Clinical data
- Other names: CBLB502

Legal status
- Legal status: Investigational

Identifiers
- CAS Number: 951628-22-1
- ChemSpider: none
- UNII: R1UQ6D1ECM
- KEGG: D10368

Chemical and physical data
- Formula: C_{1464}H_{2419}N_{457}O_{519}S_{8}
- Molar mass: 34983.62 g·mol^{−1}

Entolimod (CBLB502) is being developed by Cleveland Biolabs, Inc. for dual indications under the U.S. Food & Drug Administration's (FDA) animal efficacy rule as a pivotal-stage radiation countermeasure, and under the FDA's traditional drug approval pathway as a cancer treatment.

Entolimod is a recombinant protein that acts as an agonist of toll-like receptor 5 (TLR5), an innate immunity receptor. Entolimod activation of TLR5 triggers NF-κB signaling, mobilizing an innate immune response that drives the expression of numerous genes, including inhibitors of apoptosis, scavengers of reactive oxygen species, and a spectrum of protective or regenerative cytokines.

== Radiation countermeasure ==
The FDA established the animal efficacy rule in 2002 to permit the approval of certain drugs and biologics that are intended to reduce or prevent serious or life-threatening conditions based on evidence of safety from trial in healthy subjects and effectiveness from appropriate animal studies when human efficacy studies are not ethical or feasible.

Efficacy of entolimod as a radiation countermeasure has been assessed in animal models. These studies demonstrate that a single administration of entolimod given either before or after lethal total body irradiation leads to significant improvement in animal survival. Entolimod has been shown to reduce radiation damage to both hematopoietic (HP) and gastrointestinal (GI) tissues and improve tissue regeneration.

Two clinical studies that involved administration of a range of doses of entolimod in 150 healthy human subjects have been completed. Both studies demonstrated that administration of entolimod appears to be safe within a certain dose range. The most frequent adverse event associated with entolimod administration was a transient flu-like syndrome, which is consistent with the mechanism of action of the compound.

The FDA granted entolimod both Fast Track and Orphan Drug status for reducing the risk of death following a potentially lethal dose of total body irradiation during or after a radiation disaster.

Both the Department of Health and Human Services and the Department of Defense procure and maintain medical stockpiles to respond to bioterrorist and emerging infectious disease outbreaks. Under a declared state of emergency, countermeasures may be procured for the Strategic National Stockpile under an Emergency Use Authorization prior to their full FDA licensure approval.

== Oncology ==
Preclinical studies have shown that entolimod has a suppressive effect on growth of TLR5 expressing tumors. Entolimod has also been shown to have an effect on several animal models of liver metastasis, regardless of TLR5 expression. Additionally, entolimod evidences a supportive care benefit in preclinical models when combined with radiation treatment and cytotoxic agents with adverse gastrointestinal (GI) effects. Tissue protective effects of TLR5 agonists are limited to normal tissues and do not involve protection of tumors from treatment.

A Phase I advanced solid tumor study is currently ongoing at Roswell Park Comprehensive Cancer Center. The Principal Investigator for this trial is Alex Adjei, M.D., Ph.D., FACP, Chair of the Department of Medicine and Senior Vice President of Clinical Research at Roswell Park Comprehensive Cancer Center.

Additionally, entolimod may also be developed as an adjuvant to standard radiation and chemotherapy, which will allow using of more aggressive measures to attack malignant cells and increase the effectiveness of cancer treatment.

== Chemistry ==
Entolimod is a modified version of Salmonella flagellin FliC. The hypervariable domains D2-D3 are deleted, making it 50× less immunogenic and mostly non-pro-inflammatory. However, neutralizing antibodies against it can occur after a single injection (probably due to existing memory cells against flagellin), complicating repeated use. 10% of people naturally have a high titer of anti-flagellin antibodies, preventing it from taking effect even for the first dose.
