= Intrepid Fallen Heroes Fund =

US non-profit organization

- Founded: 2000; 26 years ago
- Founder: Zachary and Elizabeth Fisher
- Type: Nonprofit organization
- Location: New York City
- Key people: Richard Santulli, Chairman
- Website: fallenheroesfund.org

The Intrepid Fallen Heroes Fund is an American nonprofit organization that currently builds advanced treatment centers to provide care to military personnel suffering from traumatic brain injury (TBI) and post-traumatic stress disorder (PTSD). Since its inception in 2000, IFHF has provided over $200 million to treat service members with TBI and PTSD and those with amputations and severe burn injuries, in addition to helping families of U.S. military personnel killed in action.

== Initiatives ==
=== Family support ===
IFHF's first initiative was to provide support to families of both the United States and British military personnel lost in performance of their duty, mostly in service in Iraq and Afghanistan. In the years from 2000 to 2005, the Fund provided close to $20 million to spouses and dependent children, and to parents of unmarried service members. In 2005, federal legislation substantially increased the benefits to these families, and IFHF redirected its efforts.

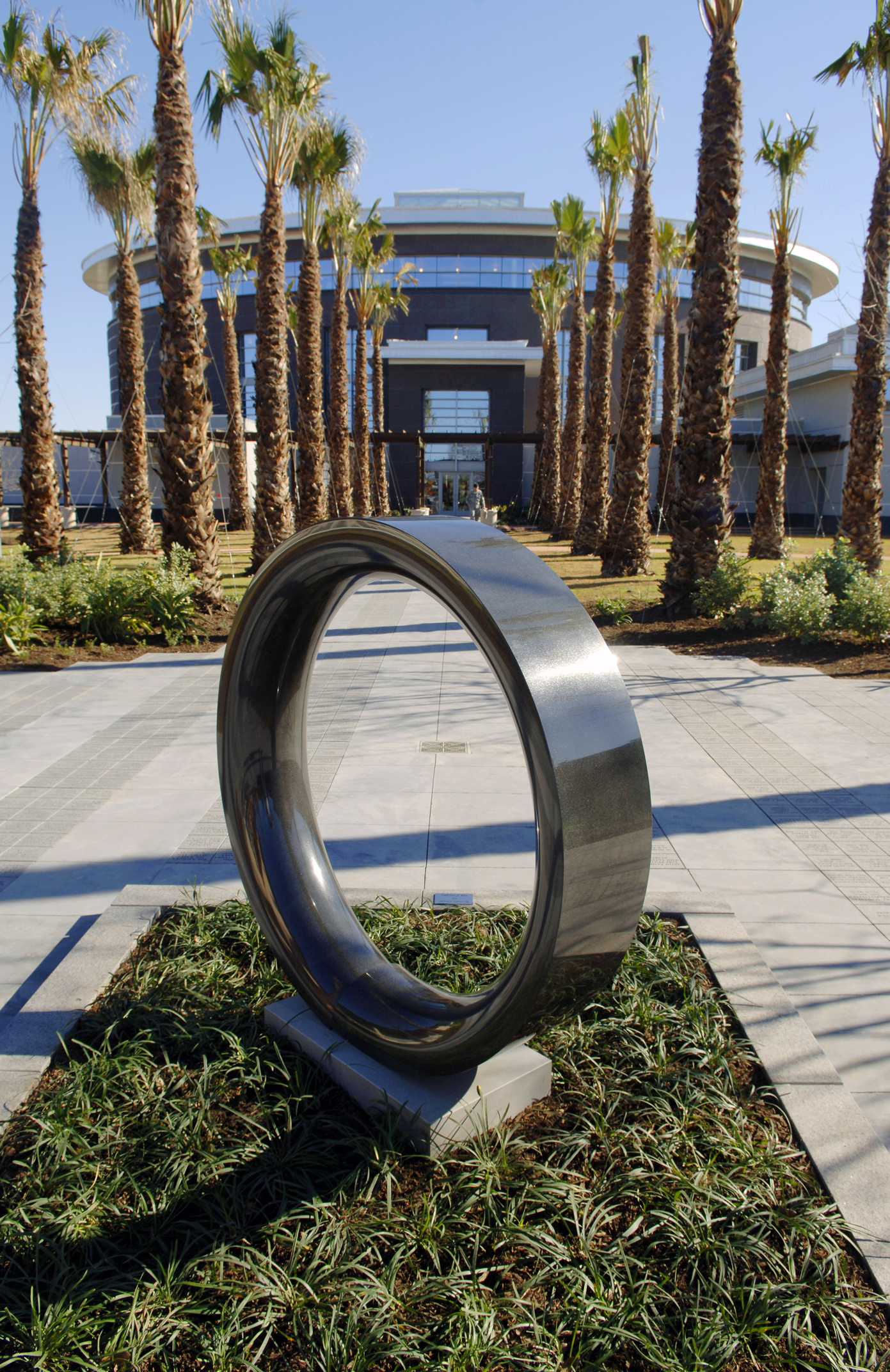
Entrance to Center for the Intrepid

=== Center for the Intrepid ===
IFHF’s next initiative was supporting military personnel severely wounded while serving in Iraq and Afghanistan. To support this effort, IFHF raised the funds and built the Center for the Intrepid, located at Brooke Army Medical Center in San Antonio, Texas. The Center for the Intrepid was completed and opened in 2007.

=== National Intrepid Center of Excellence ===
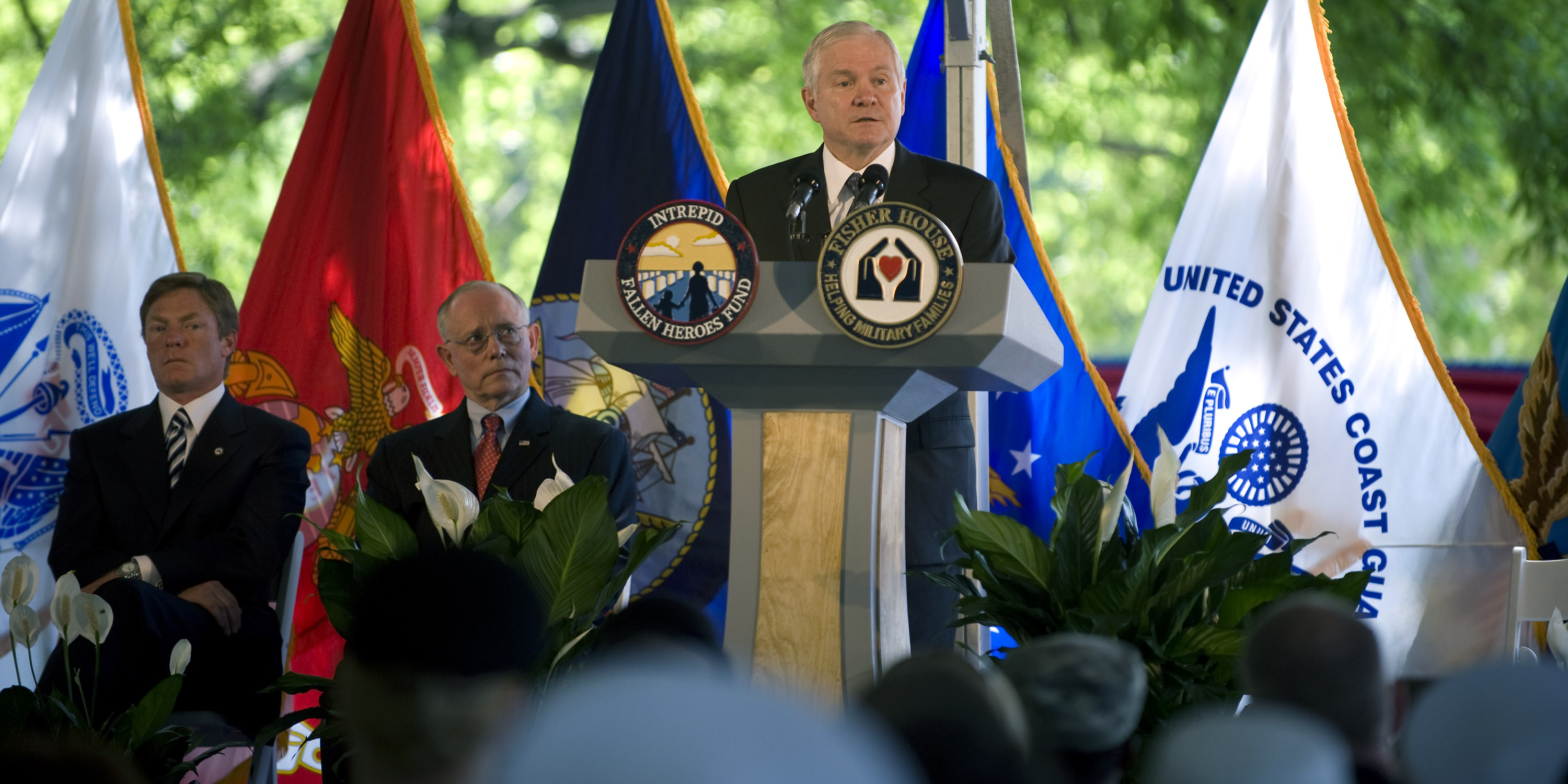
Secretary of Defense Robert M. Gates at the groundbreaking ceremony for the National Intrepid Center of Excellence

After completion of the Center for the Intrepid, IFHF began to tackle traumatic brain injury and post-traumatic stress in military personnel. IFHF constructed the National Intrepid Center of Excellence (NICoE), located in Bethesda, Maryland, at the Walter Reed National Military Medical Center. This location allows close collaboration with the Uniformed Services University, the National Institutes of Health, and the Veterans Health Administration. NICoE was dedicated and opened in 2010, and provides diagnostics, initial treatment plans, family education, introduction to therapeutic modalities, and referral and reintegration support for military personnel and veterans suffering from these issues. In addition, NICoE conducts research, tests new protocols and provides comprehensive training and education to patients, providers and families, while also maintaining ongoing telehealth follow-up care with patients all over the country and throughout the world.

=== Intrepid Spirit Centers ===
In January 2012, the Intrepid Fallen Heroes Fund announced its newest and current initiative: the creation of additional centers to serve as satellites to NICoE. As of August 2020, eight Intrepid Spirit Centers have been funded, built, and opened at the following military bases around the United States:

- Fort Belvoir, Virginia
- Camp Lejeune, North Carolina
- Fort Campbell, Kentucky
- Fort Hood, Texas
- Fort Bragg, North Carolina
- Joint Base Lewis-McChord, Washington
- Camp Pendleton, California
- Eglin Air Force Base, Florida
- Fort Carson, Colorado

== Popular culture ==
In 2008, Piers Morgan won $754,300 for the Intrepid Fallen Heroes Fund on the competitive reality show Celebrity Apprentice (The Apprentice (U.S. season 7)).

On Veterans Day in 2011, ABC's Extreme Makeover: Home Edition hosted a one-hour special: Extreme Makeover: Home Edition "Rise and Honor" A Veterans Day Special. The net proceeds raised during the show benefited six different veteran-serving organizations, including the Intrepid Fallen Heroes Fund.
