= National Intrepid Center of Excellence =

The National Intrepid Center of Excellence (NICoE) is a Department of Defense organization working to advance the clinical care, diagnosis, research, and education of military service members with PTSD, traumatic brain injury (TBI), depression, anxiety, and other deployment-related health concerns. While its sister organization, the Center for the Intrepid, treats amputee and/or burned service members, the NICoE provides diagnostic evaluations and treatment of complex TBI and PH conditions to promote physical, psychological, and spiritual healing.

The primary patient population of the NICoE is active duty service members with TBI and PH conditions who are not responding to conventional therapy. After being referred by their military health care provider and accepted into the treatment program, the service member goes to the NICoE for two to three weeks, where they will stay in a NICoE-dedicated Fisher House on the Bethesda campus. A spouse or other family member may stay with the service member during the time of treatment. Service members return to their duty station or referring military treatment facility upon the completion of their time at the NICoE with a personalized treatment plan aimed at helping them return to active duty.

The 72,000-square-foot (6,700 m^{2}) facility is adjacent to Walter Reed National Military Medical Center on the grounds of Naval Support Activity Bethesda in Bethesda, Maryland. Built by the Intrepid Fallen Heroes Fund using $65 million in private donations, it was transferred to the Department of Defense on June 24, 2010.
