= Center for the Intrepid =

Military rehabilitation facility in San Antonio, Texas

- U.S. Department of Defense
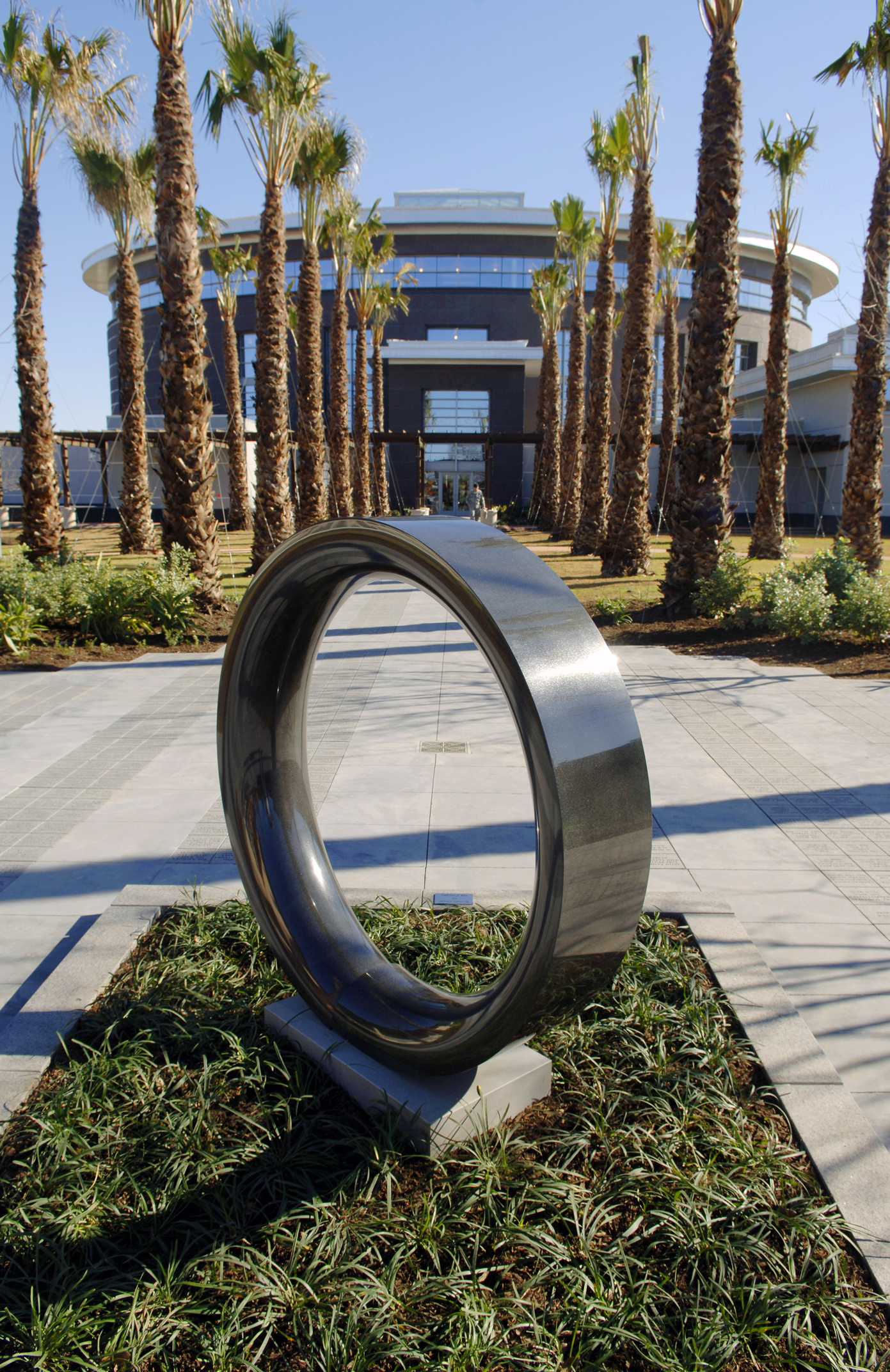
- Entrance to Center for the Intrepid

Geography
- Location: Fort Sam Houston, San Antonio, Texas, Texas, United States
- Coordinates: 29.4588°N 98.4191°W

Organization
- Type: Military hospital

Links
- Lists: Hospitals in Texas

The Center for the Intrepid is a rehabilitation facility to treat amputees and burn victims. It is located next to San Antonio Military Medical Center at Fort Sam Houston in San Antonio, Texas. It was specifically built to provide care for United States servicemen and women who have served in military operations in the Iraq War and the war in Afghanistan. Veterans from previous conflicts are also eligible to receive treatment as well as other military personnel who have sustained injuries in other operations, training exercises, or in non-combat situations. It provides training to help disabled servicemen use prosthetics, perform everyday tasks, and reintegrate with society.

The 4-story, 65,000-square-foot (6,000 m^{2}) facility was officially dedicated on January 29, 2007. Guests attending the ceremony included United States senators John McCain and Hillary Clinton. The structure was financed entirely by private donations through the Intrepid Fallen Heroes Fund. Over 600,000 people contributed to the $50 million construction cost.
