= Biodosimetry =

Biodosimetry is a measurement of biological response as a surrogate for radiation dose. The International Commission on Radiation Units and Measurements and International Atomic Energy Agency have issued guidance on performing biodosimetry and interpreting data.
