= List of nuclear weapons tests of India =

Information
- Country: India
- Test site: Pokhran Test Range, Rajasthan
- Period: May 1974 – May 1998
- Number of tests: 4 (6 Devices fired)
- Test type: Underground tests (underground, underground shaft)
- Device type: Fission and Fusion
- Max. yield: 45 kt; Scale down of 200 kt model

India's nuclear test series consists of a pair of series: Pokhran I and Pokhran II. Pokhran I was a single nuclear test conducted in 1974.

== Test Series ==
=== Pokhran I ===
Pokhran I

Information
- Country: India
- Test site: Pokhran, Rajasthan, India
- Period: 1974
- Number of tests: 1
- Test type: Underground shaft
- Device type: Fission
- Max. yield: 12 kilotonnes of TNT (50 TJ)

Test series chronology

The India test series summary table is below.

The detonations in the India's Pokhran I series are listed below:

India's Pokhran I series tests and detonations
Name (Note: The US, France and Great Britain have code-named their test events, while the USSR and China did not, and therefore have only test numbers (with some exceptions – Soviet peaceful explosions were named). Word translations into English in parentheses unless the name is a proper noun. A dash followed by a number indicates a member of a salvo event. The US also sometimes named the individual explosions in such a salvo test, which results in "name1 – 1(with name2)". If test is canceled or aborted, then the row data like date and location discloses the intended plans, where known.)	Date time (UT)	Local time zone (Note: To convert the UT time into standard local, add the number of hours in parentheses to the UT time; for local daylight saving time, add one additional hour. If the result is earlier than 00:00, add 24 hours and subtract 1 from the day; if it is 24:00 or later, subtract 24 hours and add 1 to the day. Historical time zone data obtained from the IANA time zone database.)	Location (Note: Rough place name and a latitude/longitude reference; for rocket-carried tests, the launch location is specified before the detonation location, if known. Some locations are extremely accurate; others (like airdrops and space blasts) may be quite inaccurate. "~" indicates a likely pro-forma rough location, shared with other tests in that same area.)	Elevation + height (Note: Elevation is the ground level at the point directly below the explosion relative to sea level; height is the additional distance added or subtracted by tower, balloon, shaft, tunnel, air drop or other contrivance. For rocket bursts the ground level is "N/A". In some cases it is not clear if the height is absolute or relative to ground, for example, Plumbbob/John. No number or units indicates the value is unknown, while "0" means zero. Sorting on this column is by elevation and height added together.)	Delivery, (Note: Atmospheric, airdrop, balloon, gun, cruise missile, rocket, surface, tower, and barge are all disallowed by the Partial Nuclear Test Ban Treaty. Sealed shaft and tunnel are underground, and remained useful under the PTBT. Intentional cratering tests are borderline; they occurred under the treaty, were sometimes protested, and generally overlooked if the test was declared to be a peaceful use.) Purpose (Note: Include weapons development, weapon effects, safety test, transport safety test, war, science, joint verification and industrial/peaceful, which may be further broken down.)	Device (Note: Designations for test items where known, "?" indicates some uncertainty about the preceding value, nicknames for particular devices in quotes. This category of information is often not officially disclosed.)	Yield (Note: Estimated energy yield in tons, kilotons, and megatons. A ton of TNT equivalent is defined as 4.184 gigajoules (1 gigacalorie).)	Fallout (Note: Radioactive emission to the atmosphere aside from prompt neutrons, where known. The measured species is only iodine-131 if mentioned, otherwise it is all species. No entry means unknown, probably none if underground and "all" if not; otherwise notation for whether measured on the site only or off the site, where known, and the measured amount of radioactivity released.)	References	Notes
Smiling Buddha	18 May 1974 02:34:55.0	IST (+5.5 hrs)	Pokhran, India 27.09451°N 71.75365°E	235 m (771 ft) – 107 m (351 ft)	underground shaft,		12 kt			Indira Gandhi declared Smiling Buddha to be a peaceful test.

=== Pokhran II ===
Pokhran 5

Information
- Country: India
- Test site: Pokhran, India
- Period: 1998
- Number of tests: 2 (5 devices fired)
- Test type: Underground tests (underground, underground shaft)
- Device type: Fission and Fusion
- Max. yield: 45 kilotonnes of TNT (190 TJ); Scale down of 200 kt model

Test series chronology

Pokhran II was a group of 2 nuclear tests conducted in 1998.

India's Pokhran II series tests and detonations
Name (Note: The US, France and Great Britain have code-named their test events, while the USSR and China did not, and therefore have only test numbers (with some exceptions – Soviet peaceful explosions were named). Word translations into English in parentheses unless the name is a proper noun. A dash followed by a number indicates a member of a salvo event. The US also sometimes named the individual explosions in such a salvo test, which results in "name1 – 1(with name2)". If test is canceled or aborted, then the row data like date and location discloses the intended plans, where known.)	Date time (UT)	Local time zone (Note: To convert the UT time into standard local, add the number of hours in parentheses to the UT time; for local daylight saving time, add one additional hour. If the result is earlier than 00:00, add 24 hours and subtract 1 from the day; if it is 24:00 or later, subtract 24 hours and add 1 to the day.)	Location (Note: Rough place name and a latitude/longitude reference; for rocket-carried tests, the launch location is specified before the detonation location, if known. Some locations are extremely accurate; others (like airdrops and space blasts) may be quite inaccurate. "~" indicates a likely pro-forma rough location, shared with other tests in that same area.)	Elevation + height (Note: Elevation is the ground level at the point directly below the explosion relative to sea level; height is the additional distance added or subtracted by tower, balloon, shaft, tunnel, air drop or other contrivance. For rocket bursts the ground level is "N/A". In some cases it is not clear if the height is absolute or relative to ground, for example, Plumbbob/John. No number or units indicates the value is unknown, while "0" means zero. Sorting on this column is by elevation and height added together.)	Delivery, (Note: Atmospheric, airdrop, balloon, gun, cruise missile, rocket, surface, tower, and barge are all disallowed by the Partial Nuclear Test Ban Treaty. Sealed shaft and tunnel are underground, and remained useful under the PTBT. Intentional cratering tests are borderline; they occurred under the treaty, were sometimes protested, and generally overlooked if the test was declared to be a peaceful use.) Purpose (Note: Include weapons development, weapon effects, safety test, transport safety test, war, science, joint verification and industrial/peaceful, which may be further broken down.)	Device (Note: Designations for test items where known, "?" indicates some uncertainty about the preceding value, nicknames for particular devices in quotes. This category of information is often not officially disclosed.)	Yield (Note: Estimated energy yield in tons, kilotons, and megatons. A ton of TNT equivalent is defined as 4.184 gigajoules (1 gigacalorie).)	Fallout (Note: Radioactive emission to the atmosphere aside from prompt neutrons, where known. The measured species is only iodine-131 if mentioned, otherwise it is all species. No entry means unknown, probably none if underground and "all" if not; otherwise notation for whether measured on the site only or off the site, where known, and the measured amount of radioactivity released.)	References	Notes
Shakti 1 - 1	11 May 1998 10:13:41.8	IST (+5.5 hrs)	Pokhran, India: White House 27.07883°N 71.72231°E	226 m (741 ft) – 200 m (660 ft)	underground shaft,		45 kt			Two stage thermonuclear device with fusion boosted primary, intended for missile warhead; test design yield 45 kt, with a 200 kt deployed yield.
Shakti 1 - 2	11 May 1998 10:13:41.8	IST (+5.5 hrs)	Pokhran, India: Taj Mahal 27.07883°N 71.72231°E	226 m (741 ft) – 150 m (490 ft)	underground shaft,		12 kt			Lightweight pure fission tactical bomb/missile warhead, 12 kt design yield; exact locations of sites is unknown.
Shakti 1 - 3	11 May 1998 10:13:41.8	IST (+5.5 hrs)	Pokhran, India: Kumbhkaran 27.07883°N 71.72231°E	226 m (741 ft) +	underground,		200 t			Fission experimental device, reportedly made with reactor-grade plutonium. Probably a fusion boosted design without the fusion fuel, 0.3 kt design yield; exact locations of sites is unknown.
Shakti 2 - 1	13 May 1998 06:51:??	IST (+5.5 hrs)	Pokhran, India: Navtala 1 27.07347°N 71.71353°E	226 m (741 ft) – 20 m (66 ft)	underground,		500 t			A 0.5 kt experimental device; exact locations of sites is unknown.
Shakti 2 - 2	13 May 1998 06:51:??	IST (+5.5 hrs)	Pokhran, India: Navtala 2 27.07347°N 71.71353°E	226 m (741 ft) +	underground,		300 t			A 0.2 kt experimental device that used uranium-233; exact locations of sites is unknown.
Shakti 2 - 3 (canceled)	13 May 1998 06:51:??	IST (+5.5 hrs)	Pokhran, India: Navtala 3 27.0734°N 71.7135°E	226 m (741 ft) +	underground,		unknown yield			Not fired; another low yield experimental device Exact locations of sites is unknown.

== Summary ==
India's nuclear testing series summary
Series or years	Years covered	Tests (Note: Includes all tests with potential for nuclear fission or fusion explosion, including combat use, singleton tests, salvo tests, zero yield fails, safety experiments, and bombs incapacitated by accidents but still intended to be fired. It does not include hydronuclear and subcritical tests,, and misfires of a device which was subsequently fired successfully.)	Devices fired	Devices with unknown yield	Peaceful use tests	Non-PTBT tests (Note: Number of tests which would have been in violation of the Partial Test Ban Treaty of 1963, such as atmospheric, space or underwater tests. Some "peaceful use" cratering tests which should have been violations were protested, and later quietly dropped.)	Yield range (kilotons) (Note: "Small" refers to a value greater than zero but less than 0.5 kt.)	Total yield (kilotons) (Note: Some yields are described like "< 20 kt"; such are scored at one half of the numeric amount, i.e., yield of 10k in this example. "Unknown yield" adds nothing to the total.)	Notes
Pokhran I	1974	1	1		1		12	12	
Pokhran–II	1998	3	5				small to 45	58	
Totals	1974-May-18 to 1998-May-13	4	6		1		0 to 45	70	Total country yield is 0.013% of all nuclear testing.

== Sources ==
- Andryushi, LA; Voloshin, N.P.; Ilkaev, R.I.; Matushchenko, A.M.; Ryabev, L.D.; Strukov, V.G.; Chernyshev, A.K.; Yudin, Yu.A., Mikhailov, V.N. (ed.), Catalog of Worldwide Nuclear Testing, archived from the original on 19 December 2013
- Wm Robert Johnston, PhD, Johnston and johnston Archive of Nuclear Weapons
