= Amifostine =

Chemical compound

Clinical data
- AHFS/Drugs.com: Monograph
- Routes of administration: Intravenous
- ATC code: V03AF05 (WHO)

Legal status
- Legal status: US: ℞-only

Pharmacokinetic data
- Bioavailability: complete
- Elimination half-life: 8 minutes

Identifiers
- IUPAC name: 2-(3-aminopropylamino)ethylsulfanylphosphonic acid
- CAS Number: 112901-68-5; anhydrous: 20537-88-6
- PubChem CID: 2141
- DrugBank: DB01143
- ChemSpider: 2056
- UNII: M487QF2F4V; anhydrous: ILA426L95O
- KEGG: C06819
- ChEBI: CHEBI:2636
- ChEMBL: ChEMBL1006
- CompTox Dashboard (EPA): DTXSID8022585
- ECHA InfoCard: 100.161.827

Chemical and physical data
- Formula: C_{5}H_{15}N_{2}O_{3}PS
- Molar mass: 214.22 g·mol^{−1}
- 3D model (JSmol): Interactive image
- SMILES: O=P(O)(O)SCCNCCCN
- InChI: InChI=1S/C5H15N2O3PS/c6-2-1-3-7-4-5-12-11(8,9)10/h7H,1-6H2,(H2,8,9,10); Key:JKOQGQFVAUAYPM-UHFFFAOYSA-N

Amifostine (ethiofos) is a cytoprotective adjuvant used in cancer chemotherapy and radiotherapy involving DNA-binding chemotherapeutic agents. It is marketed by Clinigen Group under the trade name Ethyol.

== Indications ==
Amifostine is used therapeutically to reduce the incidence of neutropenia-related fever and infection induced by DNA-binding chemotherapeutic agents including alkylating agents (e.g. cyclophosphamide) and platinum-containing agents (e.g. cisplatin). It is also used to decrease the cumulative nephrotoxicity associated with platinum-containing agents. Amifostine is also indicated to reduce the incidence of xerostomia in patients undergoing radiotherapy for head and neck cancer.

Amifostine was originally indicated to reduce the cumulative renal toxicity from cisplatin in non-small cell lung cancer. However, while nephroprotection was observed, the probability that amifostine could protect tumors could not be excluded. Additional data have shown that amifostine-mediated tumor protection, in any clinical scenario, is unlikely.

== Pharmacokinetics ==
WR-1065, 2-((aminopropyl)amino)ethanethiol, the active metabolite of amifostine

Amifostine is an organic thiophosphate prodrug which is hydrolysed in vivo by alkaline phosphatase to the active cytoprotective thiol metabolite, WR-1065. The selective protection of non-malignant tissues is believed to be due to higher alkaline phosphatase activity, higher pH, and vascular permeation of normal tissues.

Amifostine can be administered intravenously or subcutaneously after reconstitution with normal saline. Infusions lasting less than 15 minutes decrease the risk of adverse effects. The patient should be well-hydrated prior to administration.

== Mechanism of action ==
Inside cells, amifostine detoxifies reactive metabolites of platinum and alkylating agents, as well as scavenges free radicals. Other possible effects include accelerated DNA repair, induction of cellular hypoxia, inhibition of apoptosis, alteration of gene expression and modification of enzyme activity. Amifostine is believed to radioprotect normal tissue via Warburg-type effects.

== Adverse effects ==
Common side effects of amifostine include hypocalcemia, diarrhea, nausea, vomiting, sneezing, somnolence, and hiccups. Serious side effects include: hypotension (found in 62% of patients), erythema multiforme, Stevens–Johnson syndrome and toxic epidermal necrolysis, immune hypersensitivity syndrome, erythroderma, anaphylaxis, and loss of consciousness (rare).

== Contraindications ==
Contraindications to receiving amifostine include hypersensitivity to amifostine and aminothiol compounds like WR-1065. Ethyol contains mannitol.
