= Radiation Safety Officer =

In the United States, a Radiation Safety Officer is a person within an organization responsible for the safe use of radiation and radioactive materials as well as regulatory compliance. An organization licensed by the Nuclear Regulatory Commission to use radioactive materials must designate a Radiation Safety Officer in writing.

== Responsibility ==
The Radiation Safety Officer (or Controller) (RSO) is responsible for recommending or approving corrective actions, identifying radiation safety problems, initiating action, and ensuring compliance with regulations.

The Radiation Safety Officer is also responsible for assisting the Radiation Safety Committee in the performance of its duties and serving as its secretary.

== Duties ==
- Annual review of the radiation safety program for adherence to ALARA (as low as reasonably achievable) concepts.
- Quarterly review of occupational exposures. The RSO will review at least quarterly external radiation exposures of authorized users and workers to determine that their exposures are ALARA.
- Quarterly review of records of radiation level surveys. The RSO will review radiation levels in unrestricted and restricted areas to determine that they were at ALARA levels during the previous quarter.

Educational Responsibility

- The RSO will schedule briefings and educational sessions to inform workers of ALARA programs.
- The RSO will ensure that authorized users, workers, and ancillary personnel who may be exposed to radiation will be instructed in the ALARA philosophy and informed that the management, the Radiation Safety Committee, and the RSO are committed to implementing the ALARA concept.

Establishment of investigational levels in order to monitor individual occupational external radiation exposures

- An institution must establish Investigational Levels for occupational external radiation exposure which, when exceeded, will initiate review or an investigation into the over exposure of the worker or authorized user.
