= Solvent cabinet =

Chemical storage cabinet

In a chemistry laboratory a solvent cabinet is a chemical storage cabinet or cupboard which is properly labeled and equipped, for the storage of solvents (especially those that are combustible). A solvent cabinet should be positioned separately from acid cabinet or base cabinet (used for storing acids and caustic bases respectively, as solvents are not compatible with these substances. (Some carts for transporting containers of chemicals come equipped with a built in solvent cabinet).

A solvent cabinet must incorporate a number of safety features. It should be adequately ventilated, preventing the release of excessive fumes (being either sealed or vented). It should be equipped to contain fires and isolate the contents from sources of ignition, be grounded (to prevent sparks and static discharge).
